= 2025–26 Ekstraklasa =

100th season of top-tier football league in Poland

Ekstraklasa
- Season: 2025–26
- Dates: 18 July 2025 – 23 May 2026
- Champions: Lech Poznań (10th title)
- Relegated: Lechia Gdańsk; Arka Gdynia; BBT Nieciecza
- Champions League: Lech Poznań; Górnik Zabrze
- Europa League: Jagiellonia Białystok
- Conference League: Raków Częstochowa; GKS Katowice
- Matches: 306
- Goals: 837 (2.74 per match)
- Top goalscorer: Tomáš Bobček (20 goals)
- Biggest home win: Radomiak 5–1 Pogoń (20 July 2025); Zagłębie 6–2 Lechia (15 August 2025); Zagłębie 4–0 Arka (29 September 2025); Jagiellonia 4–0 Arka (18 October 2025); Górnik 5–1 Arka (2 November 2025); Pogoń 5–1 Zagłębie (24 November 2025); Radomiak 4–0 Górnik (28 November 2025); Lechia 5–1 Termalica (28 November 2025); Lech 4–0 Legia (26 April 2026); GKS 5–1 Termalica (3 May 2026); Górnik 6–2 Radomiak (23 May 2026); Legia 4–0 Motor (23 May 2026)
- Biggest away win: Jagiellonia 0–4 Termalica (18 July 2025); Wisła 0–4 Motor (10 May 2026)
- Highest scoring: Zagłębie 6–2 Lechia (15 August 2025); Górnik 6–2 Radomiak (23 May 2026)
- Longest winning run: 4 matches Jagiellonia Białystok; Lech Poznań; Legia Warsaw
- Longest unbeaten run: 11 matches Wisła Płock
- Longest winless run: 12 matches Legia Warsaw
- Longest losing run: 5 matches Wisła Płock; Lechia Gdańsk
- Highest attendance: 41,598; Lech 1–1 Arka (8 May 2026)
- Lowest attendance: 2,515; Termalica 1–1 Zagłębie (24 October 2025)
- Total attendance: 4,159,487
- Average attendance: 13,593 ▲7.4%

The 2025–26 Ekstraklasa (also known as PKO Bank Polski Ekstraklasa due to sponsorship reasons) was the 100th season of the Polish Football Championship, the 92nd season of the highest tier domestic division in the Polish football league system since its establishment in 1927 and the 18th season of the Ekstraklasa under its current title. The league was operated by the Ekstraklasa S.A.

Lech Poznań, the defending champions, won their second consecutive title after a 3–1 win over Radomiak Radom on 16 May 2026. The season's runner-ups were Górnik Zabrze, with Jagiellonia Białystok finishing third.

== Season overview ==
The season started on 18 July 2025 with a match between Jagiellonia Białystok and Bruk-Bet Termalica Nieciecza and concluded on 23 May 2026.

The regular season was played as a round-robin tournament. A total of 18 teams participated, 15 of which competed in the league campaign during the previous season, while the remaining three were promoted from the I liga. Each team played a total of 34 matches, half at home and half away. It was the ninth Ekstraklasa season to use VAR.

== Teams ==
A total of 18 teams participated in the 2025–26 edition of the Ekstraklasa.

The first team to win promotion from 2024–25 I liga was Arka Gdynia after a win over Bruk-Bet Termalica Nieciecza on 4 May 2025, returning to the top flight after five years of absence. The second promoted team was Bruk-Bet Termalica, following Wisła Płock's draw with Górnik Łęczna on 17 May 2025. Bruk-Bet Termalica returned to the top flight after a three-year absence. Wisła Płock became the third and final promoted team after the victory in play-off against Miedź Legnica on 1 June 2025, returning to the top flight after two years of absence.

On 11 May 2025, the first two relegated teams to 2025–26 I liga, at the same time, were Śląsk Wrocław and Stal Mielec. Following Lechia Gdańsk's win over Korona Kielce, both Śląsk and Stal's relegations were confirmed, after respective spells of seventeen and five years in the top flight. The last team to be relegated, after losing to Stal Mielec on 12 May 2025, was Puszcza Niepołomice, ending their top flight run after two seasons.

Promoted from 2024–25 I liga	Relegated from 2024–25 Ekstraklasa
▲ Arka Gdynia (1st) ▲ Bruk-Bet Termalica Nieciecza (2nd) ▲ Wisła Płock (PO)	▼ Stal Mielec (16th) ▼ Śląsk Wrocław (17th) ▼ Puszcza Niepołomice (18th)

=== Stadiums and locations ===
Note: Table lists in alphabetical order.

Location of teams in 2025–26 Ekstraklasa.
Location of teams in the Katowice urban area in 2025–26 Ekstraklasa.

Team	Location	Venue	Capacity
Arka Gdynia	Gdynia	GOSiR Stadium	15,139
Bruk-Bet Termalica Nieciecza	Nieciecza	Bruk-Bet Stadium	4,666
Cracovia	Kraków	Marshal Józef Piłsudski Stadium	15,016
GKS Katowice	Katowice	Arena Katowice	15,048
Górnik Zabrze	Zabrze	Ernest Pohl Stadium	28,236^{1}
Jagiellonia Białystok	Białystok	Chorten Arena	22,372
Korona Kielce	Kielce	Exbud Arena	15,700
Lech Poznań	Poznań	Enea Stadium	42,837
Lechia Gdańsk	Gdańsk	Polsat Plus Arena Gdańsk	41,620
Legia Warsaw	Warsaw	Polish Army Stadium	31,006
Motor Lublin	Lublin	Motor Lublin Arena	15,247
Piast Gliwice	Gliwice	Piotr Wieczorek Stadium	9,913
Pogoń Szczecin	Szczecin	Florian Krygier Stadium	21,163
Radomiak Radom	Radom	Czachor Brothers Stadium	14,440
Raków Częstochowa	Częstochowa	Miejski Stadion Piłkarski Raków	5,500
Widzew Łódź	Łódź	Widzew Łódź Stadium	18,018
Wisła Płock	Płock	Kazimierz Górski Orlen Stadium	15,004
Zagłębie Lubin	Lubin	KGHM Zagłębie Arena	16,086

1. Upgrading to 31,871.

Arka	Bruk-Bet	Cracovia	GKS Katowice	Górnik	Jagiellonia
GOSiR Stadium	Bruk-Bet Stadium	Marshal Józef Piłsudski Stadium	Arena Katowice	Ernest Pohl Stadium	Chorten Arena
Capacity: 15,139	Capacity: 4,666	Capacity: 15,016	Capacity: 15,048	Capacity: 28,236	Capacity: 22,372
Korona	Lech	Lechia	Legia	Motor	Piast
Exbud Arena	Enea Stadium	Polsat Plus Arena Gdańsk	Polish Army Stadium	Motor Lublin Arena	Piotr Wieczorek Stadium
Capacity: 15,700	Capacity: 42,837	Capacity: 41,620	Capacity: 31,006	Capacity: 15,247	Capacity: 9,913
Pogoń	Radomiak	Raków	Widzew	Wisła	Zagłębie
Florian Krygier Stadium	Czachor Brothers Stadium	Miejski Stadion Piłkarski Raków	Widzew Łódź Stadium	Kazimierz Górski Orlen Stadium	KGHM Zagłębie Arena
Capacity: 21,163	Capacity: 14,440	Capacity: 5,500	Capacity: 18,018	Capacity: 15,004	Capacity: 16,086

=== Personnel and kits ===
All teams have Lotto (brand of Totalizator Sportowy) placed on the center of the chest.

Team	Chairman	Head coach	Captain	Kit manufacturer	Kit sponsors	
Team	Chairman	Head coach	Captain	Kit manufacturer	Main	Other(s)
Arka Gdynia	(Poland) Wojciech Pertkiewicz	(Poland) Dariusz Banasik	(Poland) Dawid Gojny	Macron	Gdynia, Energa	List: Back: Superbet
Bruk-Bet Termalica Nieciecza	(Poland) Danuta Witkowska	(Poland) Marcin Brosz	(Ukraine) Artem Putivtsev	Adidas	Bruk-Bet	List: Back: Bruk-Bet; Sleeves: Bruk-Bet, R-Gol.pl; Shorts: Bruk-Bet
Cracovia		(Sweden) Bartosz Grzelak	(Georgia (country)) Otar Kakabadze	Puma	Comarch	List: Back: forBET; Sleeves: 4Move; Shorts: Kraków
GKS Katowice	(Poland) Sławomir Witek	(Poland) Rafał Górak	(Poland) Arkadiusz Jędrych	Macron	Superbet	List: Back: zondacrypto; Sleeves: Nord Partner; Shorts: Katowice
Górnik Zabrze		(Slovakia) Michal Gašparík	(Slovenia) Erik Janža	Capelli Sport	Superbet, Madej Wróbel	List: Shorts: Corendon Airlines, Body Chief
Jagiellonia Białystok		(Poland) Adrian Siemieniec	(Poland) Taras Romanczuk	Kappa	Superbet, Kuchnia Wikinga	List: Back: Białystok; Sleeves: Podlaskie; Shorts: Wings24
Korona Kielce	(Poland) Leszek Czarny	(Poland) Jacek Zieliński	(Spain) Nono	4F	Imperium Truck Matysek, EXBUD	List: Back: Lewiatan; Sleeves: Kielce, Exbud; Shorts: Lewiatan
Lech Poznań	(Poland) Karol Klimczak (Poland) Piotr Rutkowski	(Denmark) Niels Frederiksen	(Sweden) Mikael Ishak	Macron	Superbet	List: Back: Lech Pils; Sleeves: Ebury; Shorts: Mikstol
Lechia Gdańsk	(Switzerland) Paolo Urfer	(England) John Carver	(Bosnia and Herzegovina) Rifet Kapić	Adidas	zondacrypto	List: Back: XUDO; Sleeves: Gdańsk, LV Bet
Legia Warsaw	(Poland) Dariusz Mioduski	(Poland) Marek Papszun	(Poland) Artur Jędrzejczyk	Adidas	Plus500	List: Back: Fortuna; Sleeves: Speedy.io, Królewskie; Shorts: Warsaw
Motor Lublin	(Poland) Zbigniew Jakubas	(Poland) Mateusz Stolarski	(Poland) Bartosz Wolski	Hummel	Lublin, Maspo	List: Back: Perła; Sleeves: Lubelskie Voivodeship, LV Bet; Shorts: Mennica Polska, BPTour
Piast Gliwice	(Poland) Łukasz Lewiński	(Poland) Daniel Myśliwiec	(Poland) Jakub Czerwiński	4F	Lebull, Betters	List: Back: Gliwice; Sleeves: verocargo
Pogoń Szczecin	(Canada) Alexander Haditaghi	(Denmark) Thomas Thomasberg	(Poland) Kamil Grosicki	Capelli Sport	Port Szczecin-Świnoujście, zondacrypto	List: Back: STS; Sleeves: Szczecin; Shorts: International Investment Marbella, Toyota Kozłowski
Radomiak Radom	(Poland) Sławomir Stempniewski	(Portugal) Bruno Baltazar	(Brazil) Leândro	Adidas	Enea	List: Back: Radom; Sleeves: Fortuna, Windoor, 11teamsports; Shorts: Stelvio Detailing, Toyota Romanowski
Raków Częstochowa	(Poland) Wojciech Cygan	(Poland) Dawid Kroczek	(Croatia) Zoran Arsenić	Adidas	Hisense, Exact x Forestall	List: Back: Neonet; Sleeves: Częstochowa, STS; Shorts: Onesto Energy, Częstochowa
Widzew Łódź	(Poland) Michał Rydz	(Serbia) Aleksandar Vuković	(Poland) Bartłomiej Pawłowski	Macron	Newport by Panattoni, TERMOton	List: Back: STS; Sleeves: Łódź Voivodeship, Foodify; Shorts: Murapol
Wisła Płock	(Poland) Piotr Sadczuk	(Poland) Mariusz Misiura	(Poland) Łukasz Sekulski	Adidas	Orlen	List: Back: Budmat; Sleeves: Płock, LV Bet; Shorts: Płock
Zagłębie Lubin	(Poland) Paweł Jeż	(Poland) Leszek Ojrzyński	(Poland) Damian Dąbrowski	Nike	KGHM	

=== Managerial changes ===
Team	Outgoing manager	Manner of departure	Date of vacancy	Position in table	Incoming manager	Date of appointment
Piast Gliwice	(Serbia) Aleksandar Vuković	End of contract	30 June 2025	Pre-season	(Sweden) Max Mölder	1 July 2025
Cracovia	(Poland) Dawid Kroczek	End of contract	30 June 2025	Pre-season	(Slovenia) Luka Elsner	1 July 2025
Legia Warsaw	(Portugal) Gonçalo Feio	End of contract	30 June 2025	Pre-season	(Romania) Edward Iordănescu	1 July 2025
Górnik Zabrze	(Poland) Piotr Gierczak	End of contract	30 June 2025	Pre-season	(Slovakia) Michal Gašparík	1 July 2025
Widzew Łódź	(Croatia) Željko Sopić	Sacked	25 August 2025	9th	(Poland) Patryk Czubak	26 August 2025
Pogoń Szczecin	(Poland) Robert Kolendowicz	Sacked	16 September 2025	9th	(Poland) Tomasz Grzegorczyk	17 September 2025
Pogoń Szczecin	(Poland) Tomasz Grzegorczyk	End of caretaker spell	30 September 2025	13th	(Denmark) Thomas Thomasberg	30 September 2025
Widzew Łódź	(Poland) Patryk Czubak	Sacked	15 October 2025	11th	(Croatia) Igor Jovićević	15 October 2025
Piast Gliwice	(Sweden) Max Mölder	Sacked	23 October 2025	18th	(Poland) Daniel Myśliwiec	23 October 2025
Radomiak Radom	(Portugal) João Henriques	Mutual consent	30 October 2025	11th	(Portugal) Gonçalo Feio	30 October 2025
Legia Warsaw	(Romania) Edward Iordănescu	Mutual consent	31 October 2025	10th	(Spain) Iñaki Astiz	31 October 2025
Legia Warsaw	(Spain) Iñaki Astiz	End of caretaker spell	19 December 2025	17th	(Poland) Marek Papszun	19 December 2025
Raków Częstochowa	(Poland) Marek Papszun	Signed by Legia Warsaw	19 December 2025	4th	(Poland) Łukasz Tomczyk	22 December 2025
Widzew Łódź	(Croatia) Igor Jovićević	Sacked	5 March 2026	17th	(Serbia) Aleksandar Vuković	5 March 2026
Radomiak Radom	(Portugal) Gonçalo Feio	Resigned	10 March 2026	10th	(Spain) Kiko Ramírez	10 March 2026
Arka Gdynia	(Poland) Dawid Szwarga	Mutual consent	25 March 2026	16th	(Poland) Dariusz Banasik	1 April 2026
Radomiak Radom	(Spain) Kiko Ramírez	Sacked	27 March 2026	14th	(Portugal) Bruno Baltazar	27 March 2026
Cracovia	(Slovenia) Luka Elsner	Mutual consent	20 April 2026	13th	(Sweden) Bartosz Grzelak	20 April 2026
Raków Częstochowa	(Poland) Łukasz Tomczyk	Sacked	3 May 2026	5th	(Poland) Dawid Kroczek	4 May 2026

- Italics for interim managers.

== League table ==
Pos	Team	Pld	W	D	L	GF	GA	GD	Pts	Qualification or relegation
1	Lech Poznań (C)	34	16	12	6	62	45	+17	60	Qualification for the Champions League second qualifying round
2	Górnik Zabrze	34	16	8	10	50	38	+12	56 (Note: Head-to-head points: Górnik Zabrze 6, Jagiellonia Białystok 0.)	Qualification for the Champions League second qualifying round
3	Jagiellonia Białystok	34	15	11	8	56	41	+15	56	Qualification for the Europa League third qualifying round (Note: The 2025–26 Polish Cup winners (Górnik Zabrze) qualify for the Europa League third qualifying round. As Górnik Zabrze finished in the top 2, then the berth went to the third place team.)
4	Raków Częstochowa	34	16	7	11	51	40	+11	55	Qualification for the Conference League second qualifying round
5	GKS Katowice	34	14	8	12	51	45	+6	50	Qualification for the Conference League second qualifying round
6	Legia Warsaw	34	12	13	9	42	37	+5	49	
7	Zagłębie Lubin	34	13	9	12	45	38	+7	48	
8	Wisła Płock	34	12	10	12	34	38	−4	46	
9	Pogoń Szczecin	34	13	6	15	47	49	−2	45	
10	Radomiak Radom	34	11	11	12	52	53	−1	44	
11	Korona Kielce	34	11	10	13	40	40	0	43 (Note: Tied on head-to-head points and goal difference. Overall goal difference: Korona Kielce 0, Motor Lublin –7.)	
12	Motor Lublin	34	10	13	11	46	53	−7	43	
13	Cracovia	34	9	15	10	39	42	−3	42 (Note: Head-to-head points: Cracovia 4, Widzew Łódź 1.)	
14	Widzew Łódź	34	12	6	16	41	41	0	42	
15	Piast Gliwice	34	11	8	15	42	46	−4	41	
16	Lechia Gdańsk (Note: Lechia Gdańsk were deducted 5 points due to financial arrears.) (R)	34	12	7	15	62	65	−3	38	Relegation to I liga
17	Arka Gdynia (R)	34	9	9	16	34	61	−27	36	Relegation to I liga
18	Bruk-Bet Termalica Nieciecza (R)	34	9	7	18	43	65	−22	34	Relegation to I liga

Source: ekstraklasa.org 90minut.pl
Rules for classification: 1) Points; 2) Head-to-head points; 3) Head-to-head goal difference; 4) Goal difference; 5) Goals scored; 6) Number of wins; 7) Number of away wins; 8) Lower number of points based on yellow and red cards (red card = 3 points, yellow card = 1 point, sending-off = 3 points - including 1 point for first yellow card); 9) Fairplay ranking; 10) Draw.
(Note: Head-to-head record is used only after all the matches between the teams in question have been played)
(C) Champions; (R) Relegated

== Results ==
Home \ Away	ARK	BBT	CRA	GKS	GÓR	JAG	KOR	LPO	LGD	LEG	MOT	PIA	POG	RAD	RAK	WID	WIS	ZAG
Arka Gdynia	—	2–3	2–1	2–1	0–0	0–3	0–0	3–1	2–2	2–2	1–0	2–1	2–1	1–1	1–4	0–0	1–0	3–1
Bruk-Bet Termalica Nieciecza	2–0	—	0–1	0–3	1–1	2–1	1–3	0–2	3–2	0–1	1–2	3–2	1–1	1–1	2–3	2–4	1–3	1–1
Cracovia	2–2	2–0	—	1–0	1–1	0–0	1–1	2–2	2–2	2–1	1–2	2–3	1–1	0–0	2–0	1–0	1–2	0–0
GKS Katowice	4–1	5–1	0–3	—	3–1	2–2	1–0	0–1	2–0	1–1	3–2	1–3	2–0	3–2	0–1	1–0	1–0	2–2
Górnik Zabrze	5–1	0–1	3–0	3–0	—	2–1	1–0	0–1	2–1	3–1	0–1	2–1	0–1	6–2	3–1	3–2	1–1	0–2
Jagiellonia Białystok	4–0	0–4	5–2	2–1	1–2	—	3–1	0–0	2–0	2–2	4–1	1–2	3–2	1–1	1–2	3–2	1–2	1–0
Korona Kielce	3–0	2–1	0–1	1–1	1–1	1–1	—	1–2	3–0	0–2	2–0	1–1	1–0	3–0	1–4	1–0	1–1	1–2
Lech Poznań	1–1	4–1	1–4	3–3	2–1	2–2	1–1	—	1–3	4–0	2–2	3–0	2–2	4–1	4–3	2–1	2–2	1–2
Lechia Gdańsk	1–0	5–1	1–1	2–0	5–2	3–0	4–2	3–4	—	1–2	3–3	1–1	2–1	1–2	1–2	2–1	1–1	0–2
Legia Warsaw	0–0	1–2	1–0	3–1	1–1	0–0	1–2	0–0	2–2	—	4–0	0–1	1–0	4–1	1–1	1–0	2–1	1–0
Motor Lublin	1–0	1–1	3–3	2–5	0–0	1–1	2–0	0–1	2–3	1–1	—	0–0	2–1	2–2	1–1	3–0	1–1	1–0
Piast Gliwice	4–1	4–2	0–0	0–0	0–1	1–1	0–0	1–0	1–2	2–0	1–2	—	0–2	3–1	1–3	0–2	1–0	1–3
Pogoń Szczecin	1–0	1–1	2–1	1–1	0–3	1–2	2–1	1–2	3–4	0–2	4–1	2–1	—	2–2	2–0	1–0	3–0	5–1
Radomiak Radom	3–1	1–1	3–0	0–1	4–0	1–2	0–2	1–3	3–1	1–1	1–1	1–0	5–1	—	3–1	2–1	1–1	3–1
Raków Częstochowa	3–0	1–0	4–1	1–0	0–1	0–2	2–0	2–2	2–1	1–1	2–0	1–3	2–0	0–0	—	1–1	1–2	0–1
Widzew Łódź	2–0	1–0	0–0	3–0	0–0	1–3	1–3	2–1	3–1	1–1	2–0	2–1	1–2	3–2	0–1	—	1–1	1–0
Wisła Płock	0–3	3–1	0–0	1–1	0–1	0–1	2–0	0–0	1–0	1–0	0–4	2–0	2–0	0–1	2–1	0–2	—	2–1
Zagłębie Lubin	4–0	1–2	0–0	0–2	2–0	0–0	1–1	0–1	6–2	3–1	2–2	2–2	0–1	1–0	0–0	2–1	2–0	—

Source: ekstraklasa.org
Legend: Blue = home team win; Yellow = draw; Red = away team win.
For upcoming matches, an "a" indicates there is an article about the rivalry between the two participants.

== Season statistics ==
=== Top goalscorers ===
Rank	Player	Team	Goals
1	(Slovakia) Tomáš Bobček	Lechia Gdańsk	20
2	(Poland) Karol Czubak	Motor Lublin	18
3	(Norway) Jonatan Braut Brunes	Raków Częstochowa	16
3	(Sweden) Mikael Ishak	Lech Poznań	16
5	(Democratic Republic of the Congo) Afimico Pululu	Jagiellonia Białystok	15
6	(Poland) Sebastian Bergier	Widzew Łódź	14
7	(Spain) Jesús Imaz	Jagiellonia Białystok	13
8	(Honduras) Luis Palma	Lech Poznań	10
9	(Poland) Dawid Błanik	Korona Kielce	9
9	(Poland) Bartosz Nowak	GKS Katowice	9
9	(Portugal) Leonardo Rocha	Zagłębie Lubin (7); Raków Częstochowa (2)	9

=== Clean sheets ===
Rank	Player	Team	Clean sheets
1	(Poland) Sebastian Madejski	Cracovia	13
2	(Bosnia and Herzegovina) Jasmin Burić	Zagłębie Lubin	10
2	(Poland) Marcel Łubik	Górnik Zabrze	10
2	(Poland) Bartosz Mrozek	Lech Poznań	10
5	(Poland) Sławomir Abramowicz	Jagiellonia Białystok	9
5	(Poland) Xavier Dziekoński	Korona Kielce	9
5	(Poland) Rafał Strączek	GKS Katowice	9
8	(Romania) Valentin Cojocaru	Pogoń Szczecin	7
8	(Poland) Rafał Leszczyński	Wisła Płock	7
8	(Slovakia) František Plach	Piast Gliwice	7

=== Hat-tricks ===
Player	For	Against	Result	Date	Ref
(Slovakia) Tomáš Bobček	Lechia Gdańsk	Lech Poznań	3–4 (H)	26 July 2025	
(Spain) Fran Álvarez	Widzew Łódź	Bruk-Bet Termalica Nieciecza	2–4 (A)	4 October 2025	
(Spain) Edu Espiau	Arka Gdynia	Lech Poznań	3–1 (H)	9 November 2025	
(Burkina Faso) Abdoul Tapsoba	Radomiak Radom	Lechia Gdańsk	3–1 (H)	4 May 2026	

== Attendances ==
Pos	Team	Total	High	Low	Average	Change
1	Lech Poznań	528,118	41,598	14,638	31,066	+7.3%
2	Górnik Zabrze	406,093	28,236	17,596	23,888	+39.5%
3	Legia Warsaw	399,336	28,103	14,585	23,490	−5.5%
4	Pogoń Szczecin	306,284	20,991	10,807	18,017	+1.3%
5	Jagiellonia Białystok	302,900	20,048	13,021	17,818	+8.2%
6	Widzew Łódź	293,133	17,897	16,468	17,243	+2.5%
7	Lechia Gdańsk	253,495	37,500	7,545	14,911	+24.2%
8	Motor Lublin	208,263	15,200	7,978	12,251	−8.8%
9	GKS Katowice	207,649	14,651	10,594	12,215	+37.2%
10	Cracovia	202,357	14,194	9,122	11,903	+12.8%
11	Korona Kielce	199,439	14,569	7,866	11,732	+5.3%
12	Arka Gdynia	180,380	14,401	6,549	10,611	+37.8%^{1}
13	Radomiak Radom	168,661	13,982	6,226	9,921	+32.7%
14	Wisła Płock	155,167	14,258	4,093	9,127	+64.2%^{1}
15	Zagłębie Lubin	109,404	16,033	3,745	6,436	+20.3%
16	Raków Częstochowa	90,862	5,500	4,806	5,345	−1.5%
17	Piast Gliwice	83,477	8,385	3,113	4,910	−13.4%
18	Bruk-Bet Termalica Nieciecza	64,469	4,599	2,515	3,792	+43.6%^{1}
	League total	4,159,487	41,598	2,515	13,593	+7.4%

Source: 90minut.pl (in Polish)
Notes:
1. Team played last season in I liga.

== Awards ==
=== Monthly awards ===
==== Player of the Month ====
Month	Player	Team
July 2025	(Bosnia and Herzegovina) Ajdin Hasić	Cracovia
August 2025	(Spain) Jesús Imaz	Jagiellonia Białystok
September 2025	(Spain) Jesús Imaz	Jagiellonia Białystok
October 2025	(Poland) Kamil Grosicki	Pogoń Szczecin
November 2025	(Slovakia) Tomáš Bobček	Lechia Gdańsk
February 2026	(Poland) Bartosz Nowak	GKS Katowice
March 2026	(Sweden) Mikael Ishak	Lech Poznań
April 2026	(Iran) Ali Gholizadeh	Lech Poznań
May 2026	(Ukraine) Maksym Khlan	Górnik Zabrze

==== Young Player of the Month ====
Month	Player	Team
July 2025	(Poland) Marcel Reguła	Zagłębie Lubin
August 2025	(Poland) Oskar Pietuszewski	Jagiellonia Białystok
September 2025	(Poland) Oskar Pietuszewski	Jagiellonia Białystok
October 2025	(Poland) Marcel Reguła	Zagłębie Lubin
November 2025	(Poland) Miłosz Piekutowski	Jagiellonia Białystok
February 2026	(Poland) Wojciech Mońka	Lech Poznań
March 2026	(Poland) Filip Luberecki	Motor Lublin
April 2026	(Poland) Michał Gurgul	Lech Poznań
May 2026	(Poland) Wojciech Mońka	Lech Poznań

==== Coach of the Month ====
Month	Coach	Team
July 2025	(Poland) Mariusz Misiura	Wisła Płock
August 2025	(Poland) Adrian Siemieniec	Jagiellonia Białystok
September 2025	(Poland) Jacek Zieliński	Korona Kielce
October 2025	(Slovakia) Michal Gašparík	Górnik Zabrze
November 2025	(Poland) Marek Papszun	Raków Częstochowa
February 2026	(Poland) Leszek Ojrzyński	Zagłębie Lubin
March 2026	(Poland) Mateusz Stolarski	Motor Lublin
April 2026	(Slovakia) Michal Gašparík	Górnik Zabrze
May 2026	(Poland) Marek Papszun	Legia Warsaw

=== Annual awards ===
Award	Player	Club
Player of the Season	(Poland) Bartosz Nowak	GKS Katowice
Young Player of the Season	(Poland) Marcel Reguła	Zagłębie Lubin
Goalkeeper of the Season	(Poland) Xavier Dziekoński	Korona Kielce
Defender of the Season	(Poland) Wojciech Mońka	Lech Poznań
Midfielder of the Season	(Poland) Bartosz Nowak	GKS Katowice
Forward of the Season	(Poland) Karol Czubak	Motor Lublin
Coach of the Season	(Denmark) Niels Frederiksen	Lech Poznań

=== Team of the Season ===
Team of the Season
Goalkeeper	(Poland) Bartosz Mrozek (Lech Poznań)			
Defenders	(Slovenia) Erik Janža (Górnik Zabrze)	(Poland) Wojciech Mońka (Lech Poznań)	(Poland) Rafał Janicki (Górnik Zabrze)	(Portugal) Joel Pereira (Lech Poznań)
Midfielders	(Poland) Bartosz Nowak (GKS Katowice)		(Czech Republic) Patrik Hellebrand (Górnik Zabrze)	(Iran) Ali Gholizadeh (Lech Poznań)
Forwards	(Slovakia) Tomáš Bobček (Lechia Gdańsk)		(Poland) Karol Czubak (Motor Lublin)	(Sweden) Mikael Ishak (Lech Poznań)

== Number of teams by region ==
Number	Region	Team(s)
4	Silesian Voivodeship	GKS Katowice, Górnik Zabrze, Piast Gliwice, Raków Częstochowa
3	Masovian Voivodeship	Legia Warsaw, Radomiak Radom, Wisła Płock
2	Lesser Poland Voivodeship	Bruk-Bet Termalica Nieciecza, Cracovia
2	Pomeranian Voivodeship	Arka Gdynia, Lechia Gdańsk
1	Greater Poland Voivodeship	Lech Poznań
1	Lower Silesian Voivodeship	Zagłębie Lubin
1	Lublin Voivodeship	Motor Lublin
1	Łódź Voivodeship	Widzew Łódź
1	Podlaskie Voivodeship	Jagiellonia Białystok
1	Świętokrzyskie Voivodeship	Korona Kielce
1	West Pomeranian Voivodeship	Pogoń Szczecin

== See also ==
- 2025–26 I liga
- 2025–26 II liga
- 2025–26 III liga
- 2025–26 Polish Cup
- 2025 Polish Super Cup
