= 2024–25 Ekstraklasa =

99th season of top-tier football league in Poland

Ekstraklasa
- Season: 2024–25
- Dates: 19 July 2024 – 24 May 2025
- Champions: Lech Poznań (9th title)
- Relegated: Puszcza Niepołomice; Śląsk Wrocław; Stal Mielec
- Champions League: Lech Poznań
- Europa League: Legia Warsaw
- Conference League: Raków Częstochowa; Jagiellonia Białystok
- Matches: 306
- Goals: 843 (2.75 per match)
- Top goalscorer: Efthymis Koulouris (28 goals)
- Biggest home win: Lech 8–1 Puszcza (3 May 2025)
- Biggest away win: Puszcza 0–6 GKS (4 October 2024)
- Highest scoring: Puszcza 4–5 Pogoń (25 April 2025); Lech 8–1 Puszcza (3 May 2025)
- Longest winning run: 6 matches Lech Poznań; Raków Częstochowa
- Longest unbeaten run: 12 matches Jagiellonia Białystok; Raków Częstochowa
- Longest winless run: 11 matches Stal Mielec
- Longest losing run: 5 matches Puszcza Niepołomice
- Highest attendance: 41,109; Lech 1–0 Piast (24 May 2025)
- Lowest attendance: 0 (Note: Match had been played behind closed doors without spectators due to sudden flooding of the Józef Piłsudski Cracovia Stadium stands and damage to spectator security systems by heavy rains.); Cracovia 2–1 Pogoń (14 September 2024)
- Total attendance: 3,874,565
- Average attendance: 12,662 ▲2.8%

The 2024–25 Ekstraklasa (also known as PKO Bank Polski Ekstraklasa due to sponsorship reasons) was the 99th season of the Polish Football Championship, the 91st season of the highest-tier domestic division in the Polish football league system since its establishment in 1927 and the 17th season of the Ekstraklasa under its current title. The league is operated by the Ekstraklasa S.A.

Jagiellonia Białystok were the defending champions, after winning their first Polish title the previous season. Lech Poznań clinched their ninth Ekstraklasa title on 24 May 2025, following a 1–0 win over Piast Gliwice in the last matchday. The season's runner-ups were Raków Częstochowa, with Jagiellonia Białystok finishing third.

== Season overview ==
The season started on 19 July 2024 with a match between defending champions Jagiellonia Białystok and Puszcza Niepołomice, and concluded on 24 May 2025.

The regular season was played as a round-robin tournament. A total of 18 teams participated, 15 of which competed in the league campaign during the previous season, while the remaining three were promoted from the I liga. Each team played a total of 34 matches, half at home and half away. It was the eighth Ekstraklasa season to use VAR.

== Teams ==
A total of 18 teams participated in the 2024–25 edition of the Ekstraklasa.

The first team to be relegated in the 2023–24 season was ŁKS Łódź, after a home loss to Śląsk Wrocław on 4 May 2024, ending their one-year stay in Ekstraklasa. The second relegated team was Ruch Chorzów on 12 May 2024, when Puszcza Niepołomice defeated Warta Poznań; much like ŁKS, they returned to the second tier after just one year in the top-flight. The last team to be demoted was Warta Poznań, whose fate was sealed after losing to Jagiellonia Białystok on the last matchday, ending their four-year stay.

The first team that won promotion from 2023–24 I liga was Lechia Gdańsk after a win over Wisła Kraków on 11 May 2024, returning to the top flight after a year of absence. The second promoted team was GKS Katowice, taking the 2nd spot in the table away from Arka Gdynia by defeating them in the last round of the regular season; they returned to the Ekstraklasa after a nineteen-year absence. The third and final team to earn promotion was Motor Lublin, who won the play-off final against Arka on 2 June 2024; Motor entered the top flight after thirty-two years of absence.

Promoted from 2023–24 I liga	Relegated from 2023–24 Ekstraklasa
▲ Lechia Gdańsk (1st) ▲GKS Katowice (2nd) ▲ Motor Lublin (PO)	▼ Warta Poznań (16th) ▼ Ruch Chorzów (17th) ▼ ŁKS Łódź (18th)

=== Stadiums and locations ===
Note: Table lists in alphabetical order.

Location of teams in 2024–25 Ekstraklasa.
Location of teams in the Katowice urban area in 2024–25 Ekstraklasa.

Team	Location	Venue	Capacity
Cracovia	Kraków	Józef Piłsudski Cracovia Stadium	15,016
GKS Katowice	Katowice	GKS Katowice Stadium^{1} Arena Katowice	6,710; 15,048
Górnik Zabrze	Zabrze	Ernest Pohl Stadium	24,563^{2}
Jagiellonia Białystok	Białystok	Chorten Arena	22,372
Korona Kielce	Kielce	Exbud Arena	15,700
Lech Poznań	Poznań	Enea Stadium	42,837
Lechia Gdańsk	Gdańsk	Polsat Plus Arena Gdańsk	41,620
Legia Warsaw	Warsaw	Polish Army Stadium	31,006
Motor Lublin	Lublin	Motor Lublin Arena	15,247
Piast Gliwice	Gliwice	Piotr Wieczorek Stadium	9,913
Pogoń Szczecin	Szczecin	Florian Krygier Stadium	21,163
Puszcza Niepołomice	Niepołomice	Józef Piłsudski Cracovia Stadium^{3} Municipal Stadium	15,016; 2,000
Radomiak Radom	Radom	Czachor Brothers Stadium	8,840^{4}
Raków Częstochowa	Częstochowa	Raków Municipal Football Stadium	5,500
Stal Mielec	Mielec	Grzegorz Lato Stadium	7,000
Śląsk Wrocław	Wrocław	Tarczyński Arena Wrocław	42,771
Widzew Łódź	Łódź	Widzew Łódź Stadium	18,018
Zagłębie Lubin	Lubin	KGHM Zagłebie Arena	16,086

1. GKS moved to Arena Katowice in March 2025.
2. Upgrading to 31,871.
3. Since the 2023–24 season Puszcza played their matches at Józef Piłsudski Cracovia Stadium (Cracovia's home ground), due to the fact that the stadium in Niepołomice did not meet Ekstraklasa standards. They returned to their stadium in March 2025.
4. Upgrading to 14,440.

Cracovia	GKS Katowice	Górnik	Jagiellonia	Korona	Lech
Józef Piłsudski Cracovia Stadium	Arena Katowice	Ernest Pohl Stadium	Chorten Arena	Exbud Arena	Enea Stadium
Capacity: 15,016	Capacity: 15,048	Capacity: 24,563	Capacity: 22,372	Capacity: 15,700	Capacity: 42,837
Lechia	Legia	Motor	Piast	Pogoń	Puszcza
Polsat Plus Arena Gdańsk	Polish Army Stadium	Motor Lublin Arena	Piotr Wieczorek Stadium	Florian Krygier Stadium	Municipal Stadium
Capacity: 41,620	Capacity: 31,006	Capacity: 15,247	Capacity: 9,913	Capacity: 21,163	Capacity: 2,000
Radomiak	Raków	Stal	Śląsk	Widzew	Zagłębie
Czachor Brothers Stadium	Raków Municipal Football Stadium	Grzegorz Lato Stadium	Tarczyński Arena Wrocław	Widzew Łódź Stadium	KGHM Zagłebie Arena
Capacity: 8,840	Capacity: 5,500	Capacity: 7,000	Capacity: 42,771	Capacity: 18,018	Capacity: 16,086

=== Personnel and kits ===
All teams have Lotto (brand of Totalizator Sportowy) placed on the center of the chest.

Team	Chairman	Head coach	Captain	Kit manufacturer	Kit sponsors	
Team	Chairman	Head coach	Captain	Kit manufacturer	Main	Other(s)
Cracovia	(Poland) Mateusz Dróżdż	(Poland) Dawid Kroczek	(Georgia (country)) Otar Kakabadze	Puma	Comarch	List: Back: forBET; Sleeves: 4Move; Shorts: Kraków
GKS Katowice	(Poland) Sławomir Witek	(Poland) Rafał Górak	(Poland) Arkadiusz Jędrych	Hummel	Superbet	List: Sleeves: Nord Partner; Shorts: Katowice
Górnik Zabrze		(Poland) Jan Urban	(Slovenia) Erik Janža	Capelli Sport	Superbet, Węglokoks	List: Back: Könecke Polska; Sleeves: Glücksgefühle Festival, Zabrze; Shorts: Mangal Döner x LP10
Jagiellonia Białystok	(Poland) Ziemowit Deptuła	(Poland) Adrian Siemieniec	(Poland) Taras Romanczuk	Kappa	Enea, Kuchnia Wikinga	List: Back: Białystok; Sleeves: Podlaskie, STS
Korona Kielce	(Poland) Łukasz Maciejczyk	(Poland) Jacek Zieliński	(Poland) Miłosz Trojak	4F	EXBUD	List: Back: Lewiatan; Sleeves: Kielce, Targi Kielce; Shorts: Lewiatan
Lech Poznań	(Poland) Karol Klimczak (Poland) Piotr Rutkowski	(Denmark) Niels Frederiksen	(Sweden) Mikael Ishak	Macron	Superbet	List: Back: Lech Pils; Sleeves: Ebury, Poznań
Lechia Gdańsk	(Switzerland) Paolo Urfer	(England) John Carver	(Bosnia and Herzegovina) Rifet Kapić	Adidas		List: Sleeves: Gdańsk, LV BET
Legia Warsaw	(Poland) Dariusz Mioduski	(Portugal) Gonçalo Feio	(Poland) Artur Jędrzejczyk	Adidas	Plus500	List: Back: Fortuna; Sleeves: Jeton, Królewskie; Shorts: Warsaw
Motor Lublin	(Poland) Zbigniew Jakubas	(Poland) Mateusz Stolarski	(Poland) Piotr Ceglarz	Hummel	Lublin, Spiżarnia	List: Back: Perła; Shorts: CNT S.A.
Piast Gliwice	(Poland) Łukasz Lewiński	(Serbia) Aleksandar Vuković	(Poland) Jakub Czerwiński	4F	Kuchnia Wikinga, verocargo	List: Back: Gliwice; Sleeves: LV BET
Pogoń Szczecin	(Canada) Alexander Haditaghi	(Poland) Robert Kolendowicz	(Poland) Kamil Grosicki	Capelli Sport	Port Szczecin-Świnoujście, zondacrypto	List: Back: Fabryka Papieru Kaczory; Sleeves: Szczecin; Shorts: dostalk
Puszcza Niepołomice	(Poland) Jarosław Pieprzyca	(Poland) Tomasz Tułacz	(Poland) Jakub Serafin	Nike	Niepołomice	List: Sleeves: Oshee, R-GOL.com; Shorts: Promogaz-Kpis
Radomiak Radom	(Poland) Sławomir Stempniewski	(Portugal) João Henriques	(Poland) Rafał Wolski	Adidas	Enea, Windoor	List: Back: Radom; Sleeves: 11teamsports, Fortuna; Shorts: Audi Radom, Bleik Restaurant
Raków Częstochowa	(Poland) Piotr Obidziński	(Poland) Marek Papszun	(Croatia) Zoran Arsenić	Adidas	Hisense, zondacrypto	List: Back: Onesto Energy; Sleeves: Częstochowa, STS, ZPUE, Shorts: Częstochowa, Frugo
Stal Mielec	(Poland) Jacek Klimek	(Serbia) Ivan Đurđević	(Poland) Krystian Getinger	4F	Enervigo, Stara Cegielnia	List: Back: PZL Mielec; Sleeves: PZL Mielec, Mielec, Podkarpackie; Shorts: Enervigo, NCMetal
Śląsk Wrocław	(Poland) Michał Mazur	(Slovenia) Ante Šimundža	(Czech Republic) Petr Schwarz	Nike	LV BET, Kuchnia Wikinga	List: Back: Jaxan; Sleeves: Wrocław Airport; Shorts: Acana
Widzew Łódź	(Poland) Michał Rydz	(Croatia) Željko Sopić	(Poland) Bartłomiej Pawłowski	Macron	Panattoni, TERMOton	List: Back: Murapol; Sleeves: STS; Shorts: Łódź Voivodeship, CoBouw
Zagłębie Lubin	(Poland) Paweł Jeż	(Poland) Leszek Ojrzyński	(Poland) Damian Dąbrowski	Nike	KGHM	

=== Managerial changes ===
Team	Outgoing manager	Manner of departure	Date of vacancy	Position in table	Incoming manager	Date of appointment
Lech Poznań	(Poland) Mariusz Rumak	End of contract	30 June 2024	Pre-season	(Denmark) Niels Frederiksen	1 July 2024
Raków Częstochowa	(Poland) Dawid Szwarga	Sacked	30 June 2024	Pre-season	(Poland) Marek Papszun	1 July 2024
Korona Kielce	(Poland) Kamil Kuzera	Mutual consent	31 July 2024	18th	(Poland) Mariusz Arczewski	31 July 2024
Korona Kielce	(Poland) Mariusz Arczewski	End of caretaker spell	7 August 2024	18th	(Poland) Jacek Zieliński	7 August 2024
Pogoń Szczecin	(Sweden) Jens Gustafsson	Mutual consent	15 August 2024	4th	(Poland) Robert Kolendowicz	15 August 2024
Stal Mielec	(Poland) Kamil Kiereś	Sacked	30 August 2024	16th	(Poland) Janusz Niedźwiedź	2 September 2024
Zagłębie Lubin	(Poland) Waldemar Fornalik	Sacked	23 September 2024	16th	(Poland) Marcin Włodarski	25 September 2024
Śląsk Wrocław	(Poland) Jacek Magiera	Mutual consent (Note: Relieved of his duties on 12 November, left the club by mutual consent on 16 November.)	12 November 2024	18th	(Poland) Michał Hetel & (Poland) Marcin Dymkowski	12 November 2024
Lechia Gdańsk	(Poland) Szymon Grabowski	Mutual consent (Note: Suspended from his duties on 23 November, left the club by mutual consent on 27 November.)	23 November 2024	17th	(Poland) Radosław Bella & (England) Kevin Blackwell	25 November 2024
Lechia Gdańsk	(Poland) Radosław Bella & (England) Kevin Blackwell	End of caretaker spell	30 November 2024	17th	(England) John Carver	30 November 2024
Śląsk Wrocław	(Poland) Michał Hetel & (Poland) Marcin Dymkowski	End of caretaker spell	24 December 2024	18th	(Slovenia) Ante Šimundža	24 December 2024
Radomiak Radom	(Portugal) Bruno Baltazar	Signed by Caen	29 December 2024	12th	(Portugal) João Henriques	8 January 2025
Widzew Łódź	(Poland) Daniel Myśliwiec	Sacked	24 February 2025	12th	(Poland) Patryk Czubak	24 February 2025
Zagłębie Lubin	(Poland) Marcin Włodarski	Sacked	10 March 2025	15th	(Poland) Leszek Ojrzyński	13 March 2025
Widzew Łódź	(Poland) Patryk Czubak	End of caretaker spell	17 March 2025	13th	(Croatia) Željko Sopić	17 March 2025
Stal Mielec	(Poland) Janusz Niedźwiedź	Sacked	30 March 2025	16th	(Serbia) Ivan Đurđević	1 April 2025

- Italics for interim managers.

== League table ==
Pos	Team	Pld	W	D	L	GF	GA	GD	Pts	Qualification or relegation
1	Lech Poznań (C)	34	22	4	8	68	31	+37	70	Qualification for Champions League second qualifying round
2	Raków Częstochowa	34	20	9	5	51	23	+28	69	Qualification for Conference League second qualifying round
3	Jagiellonia Białystok	34	17	10	7	56	42	+14	61	Qualification for Conference League second qualifying round
4	Pogoń Szczecin	34	17	7	10	59	40	+19	58	
5	Legia Warsaw	34	15	9	10	60	45	+15	54	Qualification for Europa League first qualifying round (Note: The 2024–25 Polish Cup winners (Legia Warsaw) qualify for the Europa League first qualifying round.)
6	Cracovia	34	14	9	11	58	53	+5	51	
7	Motor Lublin	34	14	7	13	48	59	−11	49 (Note: Ranked based on head-to-head points: Motor Lublin 4 pts, GKS Katowice - 1 pt.)	
8	GKS Katowice	34	14	7	13	49	47	+2	49	
9	Górnik Zabrze	34	13	8	13	43	39	+4	47	
10	Piast Gliwice	34	11	12	11	37	36	+1	45 (Note: Ranked based on head-to-head points: Piast Gliwice 4 pts, Korona Kielce - 1 pt.)	
11	Korona Kielce	34	11	12	11	37	45	−8	45	
12	Radomiak Radom	34	11	8	15	48	52	−4	41	
13	Widzew Łódź	34	11	7	16	38	49	−11	40	
14	Lechia Gdańsk	34	10	7	17	44	59	−15	37	
15	Zagłębie Lubin	34	10	6	18	33	51	−18	36	
16	Stal Mielec (R)	34	7	10	17	39	56	−17	31	Relegation to I liga
17	Śląsk Wrocław (R)	34	6	12	16	38	53	−15	30	Relegation to I liga
18	Puszcza Niepołomice (R)	34	6	10	18	37	63	−26	28	Relegation to I liga

Source: ekstraklasa.org 90minut.pl
Rules for classification: 1) Points; 2) Head-to-head points; 3) Head-to-head goal difference; 4) Goal difference; 5) Goals scored; 6) Number of wins; 7) Number of away wins; 8) Lower number of points based on yellow and red cards (red card = 3 points, yellow card = 1 point, sending-off = 3 points - including 1 point for first yellow card); 9) Fairplay ranking; 10) Draw.
(Note: Head-to-head record is used only after all the matches between the teams in question have been played)
(C) Champions; (R) Relegated

== Results ==
Home \ Away	CRA	GKS	GÓR	JAG	KOR	LPO	LGD	LEG	MOT	PIA	POG	PUN	RAD	RCZ	STM	ŚLĄ	WID	ZAG
Cracovia	—	3–4	3–2	2–2	1–1	0–2	0–2	3–1	6–2	1–1	2–1	3–1	1–2	0–0	1–1	2–4	1–3	1–1
GKS Katowice	2–1	—	2–1	3–1	1–2	2–2	2–0	1–3	0–0	0–0	3–1	3–1	1–2	0–1	1–0	0–0	2–2	1–0
Górnik Zabrze	0–1	3–0	—	0–2	1–1	2–1	2–3	1–2	4–0	1–0	1–0	1–1	3–2	0–0	3–1	2–0	0–0	0–1
Jagiellonia Białystok	2–4	1–0	1–1	—	3–1	2–1	3–2	1–1	3–0	1–1	1–1	2–0	5–0	2–2	2–0	2–2	1–0	1–3
Korona Kielce	0–2	2–1	2–4	3–1	—	2–3	0–0	0–1	1–0	0–2	0–0	2–1	1–3	1–1	2–1	2–0	2–1	2–0
Lech Poznań	2–1	2–0	2–0	5–0	2–0	—	3–1	5–2	1–2	1–0	2–0	8–1	2–1	0–1	3–1	1–0	4–1	3–1
Lechia Gdańsk	1–2	2–3	1–2	1–0	3–2	1–0	—	0–2	0–2	3–1	0–3	0–2	1–0	1–2	3–2	1–0	1–1	1–1
Legia Warsaw	3–2	4–1	1–1	0–1	1–1	0–1	2–1	—	5–2	1–2	0–0	2–0	4–1	0–1	2–2	3–1	2–1	2–0
Motor Lublin	0–1	3–2	1–0	0–2	1–1	1–2	1–1	3–3	—	1–4	4–2	0–0	1–0	0–2	4–1	2–1	3–4	1–0
Piast Gliwice	0–0	2–2	2–0	0–1	1–1	0–0	3–3	1–0	2–3	—	2–1	1–1	0–0	0–3	2–2	2–0	0–2	1–0
Pogoń Szczecin	5–2	4–0	3–0	1–1	3–0	0–3	3–3	1–0	3–0	1–0	—	2–1	0–1	1–0	1–0	5–3	2–0	1–0
Puszcza Niepołomice	1–2	0–6	2–2	1–1	0–0	2–0	4–1	2–2	0–1	2–1	4–5	—	2–2	1–1	2–3	1–1	2–0	1–2
Radomiak Radom	2–1	1–1	1–2	2–3	4–0	2–2	2–1	3–1	2–3	1–1	2–0	2–0	—	0–2	1–2	1–1	1–1	0–1
Raków Częstochowa	0–1	1–2	1–0	1–2	1–1	0–0	3–1	3–2	2–2	0–1	1–0	2–0	2–1	—	1–0	3–0	2–1	5–1
Stal Mielec	1–1	0–1	0–0	2–1	0–1	0–2	2–1	2–2	1–0	2–0	1–2	2–0	2–2	0–2	—	1–4	1–1	2–2
Śląsk Wrocław	2–4	0–2	0–1	1–1	1–1	3–1	1–1	1–1	1–1	1–3	1–1	0–1	1–2	0–0	2–1	—	3–0	3–1
Widzew Łódź	1–1	1–0	0–2	0–1	0–1	2–1	2–0	0–2	1–2	1–0	0–4	2–0	3–2	2–3	2–1	0–0	—	2–0
Zagłębie Lubin	1–2	1–0	2–1	1–3	1–1	0–1	1–3	0–3	1–2	0–1	2–2	1–0	1–0	0–2	2–2	3–0	2–1	—

Source: ekstraklasa.org
Legend: Blue = home team win; Yellow = draw; Red = away team win.
For upcoming matches, an "a" indicates there is an article about the rivalry between the two participants.

== Season statistics ==
=== Top goalscorers ===
Rank	Player	Club	Goals
1	(Greece) Efthymis Koulouris	Pogoń Szczecin	28
2	(Sweden) Mikael Ishak	Lech Poznań	21
3	(Finland) Benjamin Källman	Cracovia	18
4	(Spain) Jesús Imaz	Jagiellonia Białystok	16
4	(Slovakia) Samuel Mráz	Motor Lublin	16
6	(Norway) Jonatan Braut Brunes	Raków Częstochowa	14
7	(Portugal) Afonso Sousa	Lech Poznań	13
8	(Portugal) Leonardo Rocha	Radomiak Radom (11); Raków Częstochowa (1)	12
9	(Spain) Adrián Dalmau	Korona Kielce	10
9	(Angola) Afimico Pululu	Jagiellonia Białystok	10
9	(Poland) Piotr Wlazło	Stal Mielec	10

=== Clean sheets ===
Rank	Player	Club	Clean sheets
1	(Poland) Kacper Trelowski	Raków Częstochowa	17
2	(Romania) Valentin Cojocaru	Pogoń Szczecin	14
2	(Poland) Bartosz Mrozek	Lech Poznań	14
4	(Slovakia) František Plach	Piast Gliwice	11
5	(Poland) Sławomir Abramowicz	Jagiellonia Białystok	10
6	(Poland) Dawid Kudła	GKS Katowice	9
7	(Poland) Rafał Gikiewicz	Widzew Łódź	8
8	(Poland) Dominik Hładun	Zagłębie Lubin	6
8	(Poland) Kevin Komar	Puszcza Niepołomice	6
8	(Poland) Michał Szromnik	Górnik Zabrze	6

=== Hat-tricks ===
Player	For	Against	Result	Date	Ref
(Portugal) Leonardo Rocha	Radomiak Radom	Korona Kielce	4–0 (H)	20 September 2024	
(Sweden) Patrik Wålemark	Lech Poznań	Korona Kielce	2–3 (A)	29 September 2024	
(Iceland) Davíð Kristján Ólafsson	Cracovia	Motor Lublin	6–2 (H)	26 October 2024	
(Slovakia) Samuel Mráz	Motor Lublin	Piast Gliwice	2–3 (A)	8 November 2024	
(Greece) Efthymis Koulouris	Pogoń Szczecin	Lechia Gdańsk	0–3 (A)	23 November 2024	
(Greece) Efthymis Koulouris	Pogoń Szczecin	Widzew Łódź	0–4 (A)	22 February 2025	
(Greece) Efthymis Koulouris	Pogoń Szczecin	GKS Katowice	4–0 (H)	6 April 2025	
(Greece) Efthymis Koulouris^{4}	Pogoń Szczecin	Puszcza Niepołomice	4–5 (A)	25 April 2025	

Note: ^{4} – player scored 4 goals

== Attendances ==
Pos	Team	Total	High	Low	Average	Change
1	Lech Poznań	492,097	41,109	16,610	28,947	+16.5%
2	Legia Warsaw	422,739	27,424	18,406	24,867	+0.6%
3	Śląsk Wrocław	320,029	36,208	9,744	18,825	−16.3%
4	Pogoń Szczecin	302,446	20,562	11,910	17,791	+2.9%
5	Górnik Zabrze	291,196	23,438	10,833	17,129	+4.4%
6	Widzew Łódź	286,022	17,663	15,136	16,825	−2.1%
7	Jagiellonia Białystok	280,039	20,607	12,439	16,473	+20.0%
8	Motor Lublin	228,306	15,200	10,812	13,430	+76.1%^{1}
9	Lechia Gdańsk	204,174	25,000	7,501	12,010	+36.5%^{1}
10	Korona Kielce	189,366	14,289	6,470	11,139	+3.9%
11	Cracovia	179,413	13,709	2,800	10,554	+16.7%
12	GKS Katowice	151,383	15,048	6,684	8,905	+130.2%^{1}
13	Radomiak Radom	127,128	8,564	3,877	7,478	−3.4%
14	Piast Gliwice	96,386	9,361	3,684	5,670	+7.7%
15	Raków Częstochowa	92,267	5,500	5,211	5,427	+2.1%
16	Zagłębie Lubin	90,936	13,331	2,496	5,349	−16.6%
17	Stal Mielec	84,058	6,477	3,612	4,945	−14.3%
18	Puszcza Niepołomice	36,580	4,095	1,243	2,152	−22.9%
	League total	3,874,565	41,109	1,243	12,662	+2.8%

Source: 90minut.pl (in Polish)
Notes:
1. Team played last season in I liga.

== Awards ==
=== Monthly awards ===
==== Player of the Month ====
Month	Player	Club
July 2024	(Portugal) Leonardo Rocha	Radomiak Radom
August 2024	(Poland) Bartosz Kapustka	Legia Warsaw
September 2024	(Brazil) Jean Carlos	Raków Częstochowa
October 2024	(Spain) Jesús Imaz	Jagiellonia Białystok
November 2024	(Slovakia) Samuel Mráz	Motor Lublin
February 2025	(Poland) Kamil Grosicki	Pogoń Szczecin
March 2025	(Norway) Jonatan Braut Brunes	Raków Częstochowa
April 2025	(Greece) Efthymis Koulouris	Pogoń Szczecin
May 2025	(Iran) Ali Gholizadeh	Lech Poznań

==== Young Player of the Month ====
Month	Player	Club
July 2024	(Poland) Jan Ziółkowski	Legia Warsaw
August 2024	(Poland) Mateusz Kowalczyk	GKS Katowice
September 2024	(Poland) Szymon Weirauch	Lechia Gdańsk
October 2024	(Poland) Antoni Kozubal	Lech Poznań
November 2024	(Poland) Sławomir Abramowicz	Jagiellonia Białystok
February 2025	(Poland) Kacper Trelowski	Raków Częstochowa
March 2025	(Poland) Mariusz Fornalczyk	Korona Kielce
April 2025	(Poland) Tomasz Pieńko	Zagłębie Lubin
May 2025	(Poland) Kacper Sezonienko	Lechia Gdańsk

==== Coach of the Month ====
Month	Coach	Club
July 2024	(Poland) Adrian Siemieniec	Jagiellonia Białystok
August 2024	(Denmark) Niels Frederiksen	Lech Poznań
September 2024	(Denmark) Niels Frederiksen	Lech Poznań
October 2024	(Poland) Adrian Siemieniec	Jagiellonia Białystok
November 2024	(Poland) Mateusz Stolarski	Motor Lublin
February 2025	(Poland) Robert Kolendowicz	Pogoń Szczecin
March 2025	(Poland) Marek Papszun	Raków Częstochowa
April 2025	(Poland) Leszek Ojrzyński	Zagłębie Lubin
May 2025	(Denmark) Niels Frederiksen	Lech Poznań

=== Annual awards ===
Award	Player	Club
Player of the Season	(Greece) Efthymis Koulouris	Pogoń Szczecin
Young Player of the Season	(Poland) Kacper Trelowski	Raków Częstochowa
Goalkeeper of the Season	(Poland) Bartosz Mrozek	Lech Poznań
Defender of the Season	(Poland) Mateusz Skrzypczak	Jagiellonia Białystok
Midfielder of the Season	(Portugal) Afonso Sousa	Lech Poznań
Forward of the Season	(Greece) Efthymis Koulouris	Pogoń Szczecin
Coach of the Season	(Denmark) Niels Frederiksen	Lech Poznań
Goal of the Season	(Portugal) Joel Pereira	Lech Poznań

=== Team of the Season ===
Team of the Season
Goalkeeper	(Poland) Sławomir Abramowicz (Jagiellonia Białystok)			
Defenders	(Portugal) Rúben Vinagre (Legia Warsaw)	(Democratic Republic of the Congo) Steve Kapuadi (Legia Warsaw)	(Poland) Mateusz Skrzypczak (Jagiellonia Białystok)	(Greece) Stratos Svarnas (Raków Częstochowa)
Midfielders	(Sweden) Gustav Berggren (Raków Częstochowa)	(Portugal) Afonso Sousa (Lech Poznań)	(Poland) Kamil Grosicki (Pogoń Szczecin)	
Forwards	(Sweden) Mikael Ishak (Lech Poznań)		(Greece) Efthymis Koulouris (Pogoń Szczecin)	(Spain) Jesús Imaz (Jagiellonia Białystok)

== Number of teams by region ==
Number	Region	Team(s)
4	Silesian Voivodeship	GKS Katowice, Górnik Zabrze, Piast Gliwice and Raków Częstochowa
2	Lesser Poland Voivodeship	Cracovia and Puszcza Niepołomice
2	Lower Silesian Voivodeship	Śląsk Wrocław and Zagłębie Lubin
2	Masovian Voivodeship	Legia Warsaw and Radomiak Radom
1	Greater Poland Voivodeship	Lech Poznań
1	Lublin Voivodeship	Motor Lublin
1	Łódź Voivodeship	Widzew Łódź
1	Podkarpackie Voivodeship	Stal Mielec
1	Podlaskie Voivodeship	Jagiellonia Białystok
1	Pomeranian Voivodeship	Lechia Gdańsk
1	Świętokrzyskie Voivodeship	Korona Kielce
1	West Pomeranian Voivodeship	Pogoń Szczecin
0	Kuyavian-Pomeranian Voivodeship	
0	Lubusz Voivodeship	
0	Opole Voivodeship	
0	Warmian-Masurian Voivodeship	

== See also ==
- 2024–25 I liga
- 2024–25 II liga
- 2024–25 III liga
- 2024–25 Polish Cup
- 2024 Polish Super Cup
