= Dawid Szulczek =

Polish football manager (born 1990)

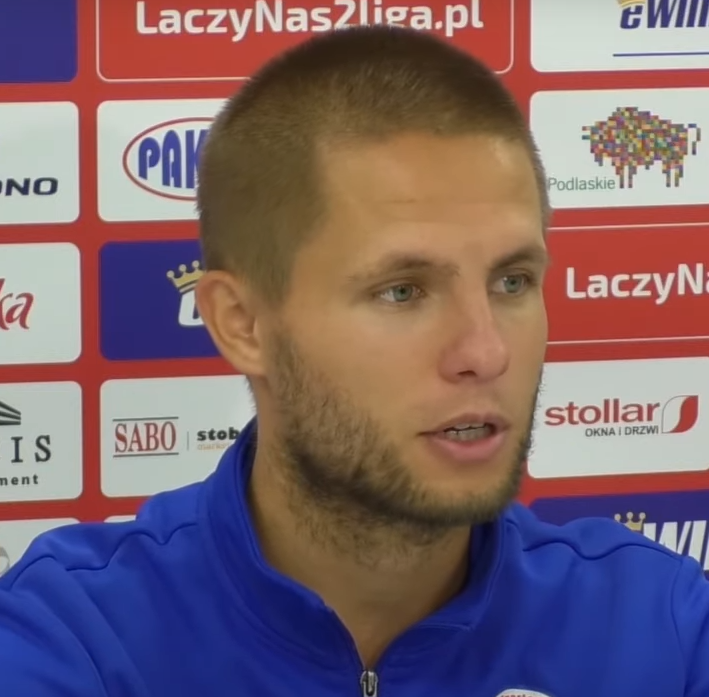
- Szulczek in 2021

Personal information
- Date of birth: 26 January 1990 (age 36)
- Place of birth: Świętochłowice, Poland
- Position: Central midfielder

Team information
- Current team: Raków Częstochowa (assistant)

Senior career*
Years	Team	Apps	(Gls)
–2013	Śląsk Świętochłowice		

Managerial career
- 2017: Rozwój Katowice (caretaker)
- 2020–2021: Wigry Suwałki
- 2021–2024: Warta Poznań
- 2024–2025: Ruch Chorzów
- 2026: Raków Częstochowa (caretaker)
- * Club domestic league appearances and goals

Dawid Szulczek (born 26 January 1990) is a Polish professional football manager and former player who is currently the assistant manager of Ekstraklasa club Raków Częstochowa.

== Managerial career ==
After retiring as a player in 2013, Szulczek started his coaching career as an assistant at Górnik Wesoła. Before the 2014–15 season, he joined Rozwój Katowice and held the role of assistant coach until 2017. After head coach Tadeusz Krawiec's dismissal before the last matchday of the 2017–18 season, he took on the position of interim coach and led Rozwój to a 1–0 II liga win against Gryf Wejherowo on 3 June 2017.

On 13 June 2017, Szulczek was recruited by Artur Skowronek and joined his staff at Wigry Suwałki as an assistant coach. He would follow Skowronek and work in a similar role at Stal Mielec and Wisła Kraków.

=== Wigry Suwałki ===
On 21 July 2020, he was appointed manager of II liga team Wigry Suwałki. Wigry finished the 2020–21 campaign in 4th, with 18 wins, 10 draws and 8 losses in 36 games. They would subsequently crash out of I liga promotion play-offs in the first round after losing to KKS 1925 Kalisz.

He obtained the UEFA Pro license in September 2020, becoming the youngest holder of such certification in Poland at the time.

=== Warta Poznań ===
On 8 November 2021, his contract was bought out by Ekstraklasa side Warta Poznań and he signed until the end of the season, with a two-year extension option. With Szulczek in charge, Warta escaped the relegation zone and finished the season in 11th. On 1 April 2022, his contract was extended until June 2024.

Under Szulczek's tenure, which included an eighth-place finish at the end of the 2022–23 campaign, Warta has overperformed and managed to avoid relegation twice despite their limited transfer activity and having one of if not the lowest reported club budget in Ekstraklasa. He has received praise for his work, which has been cited as a catalyst for other top-level Polish clubs to hire young managers with no playing experience beyond lower divisions or youth level, such as Adrian Siemieniec, Daniel Myśliwiec, Dawid Szwarga or Gonçalo Feio.

On 18 April 2024, amid ongoing media reports linking him with Cracovia, it was announced Szulczek would leave Warta at the end of his contract. He was unable to save Warta from relegation at the end of the 2023–24 season, as they lost 0–3 to Jagiellonia Białystok and were jumped in the standings by Korona Kielce following their away win over Lech Poznań on the last matchday.

=== Ruch Chorzów ===
On 27 August 2024, Szulczek was appointed manager of I liga side Ruch Chorzów, a club he supported as a child, on a deal until the end of June 2026. Ruch reached the 2024–25 Polish Cup semi-finals, where they were eliminated by eventual winners Legia Warsaw, but faltered in the league, resulting in a tenth-place finish. He left the club by mutual consent on 5 August 2025, two days after a 1–3 away loss to Śląsk Wrocław.

=== Raków Częstochowa ===
On 5 January 2026, Szulczek joined the coaching staff of Ekstraklasa club Raków Częstochowa as an assistant under newly appointed manager Łukasz Tomczyk. In May 2026, Dawid Kroczek replaced Tomczyk and retained Szulczek as part of his coaching staff. On 1 September 2026, a day after Kroczek's dismissal, Szulczek took charge of Raków on a caretaker basis. He took charge of two league matches, a 2–1 loss to Górnik Zabrze and a 1–0 defeat by Lech Poznań, before Tomasz Kaczmarek was appointed manager on 8 September.

== Managerial statistics ==
As of match played 6 September 2026

Managerial record by team and tenure
Team	From	To	Record							
Team	From	To	G	W	D	L	GF	GA	GD	Win %
Rozwój Katowice (caretaker)	30 May 2017	13 June 2017	1	1	0	0	1	0	+1	100.00
Wigry Suwałki	26 July 2020	8 November 2021	55	25	15	15	73	57	+16	45.45
Warta Poznań	8 November 2021	30 June 2024	93	33	23	37	105	104	+1	35.48
Ruch Chorzów	27 August 2024	5 August 2025	35	17	6	12	55	48	+7	48.57
Raków Częstochowa (caretaker)	1 September 2026	8 September 2026	2	0	0	2	1	3	−2	0.00
Total			186	76	44	66	236	212	+24	40.86

== Honours ==
Individual

- I liga Coach of the Month: November & December 2024
