= Mateusz Stolarski =

Polish football manager (born 1993)

Personal information
- Date of birth: 3 January 1993 (age 33)
- Place of birth: Kraków, Poland

Team information
- Current team: Widzew Łódź (manager)

Youth career
- Years: Team
- 2002–2009: Wisła Kraków

Managerial career
- 2022: Wólczanka Wólka Pelkinska (caretaker)
- 2024–2026: Motor Lublin
- 2026–: Widzew Łódź

Mateusz Stolarski (born 3 January 1993) is a Polish professional football manager and former player who currently manages Ekstraklasa club Widzew Łódź.

== Playing career ==
As a youth player, Stolarski joined the youth academy of Polish club Wisła Kraków, where was known for his technical ability. He retired from association football in 2009, but continued to play futsal in the Lesser Poland area, and made appearances for the Poland national under-21 futsal team.

== Managerial career ==
In 2012, Stolarski began work as a youth coach for Wisła Kraków's academy. In August 2019, he was hired by Stal Rzeszów to manage their reserve and under-19 sides. A year later, he was promoted to the role of first-team assistant manager under Janusz Niedźwiedź, and continued in his role until 2022, working with managers Marcin Wołowiec and Daniel Myśliwiec.

In May 2022, he was appointed caretaker manager of III liga outfit Wólczanka Wólka Pelkinska.

On 21 September 2022, he joined II liga club Motor Lublin's management staff as an assistant under Gonçalo Feio. Placed last in the league table at the time of Stolarski's and Feio's appointments, Motor was promoted to I liga at the end of the 2022–23 season.

On 18 March 2024, following Feio's resignation, Stolarski was appointed head coach of Motor. He successfully led the club to a fourth-place finish and a promotion play-off final win against Arka Gdynia on 2 June 2024, resulting in Motor's return to the Ekstraklasa after 32 years of absence. In doing so, at the age of thirty-one, Stolarski became the youngest manager in the Polish top flight. On 21 June 2024, he prolonged his contract with the club until the end of June 2025.

After finishing the year placed 7th, with eight wins and four draws in 18 games, Motor extended Stolarski's deal until June 2027 with an option for another year. Motor finished the 2024–25 league season in seventh place, and were twelfth in the following one. On 18 June 2026, he was dismissed and replaced by Mariusz Misiura.

On 11 September 2026, Stolarski was appointed manager of Widzew Łódź, replacing Aleksandar Vuković on a two-year contract with a two-year extension option. Winless in his first six games in charge, Stolarski led Widzew to a 3–0 home victory against Pogoń Szczecin on 7 November, the club's first win since 9 August.

== Personal life ==
Stolarski was born on 3 January 1993 in Kraków, Poland. He has been a supporter of Polish side Wisła Kraków. He is married, and has a daughter.

His brother Paweł Stolarski is a professional footballer - they were reunited in January 2024, when Paweł joined Motor.

== Managerial statistics ==
As of match played 22 November 2026

Managerial record by team and tenure
Team	From	To	Record							
Team	From	To	G	W	D	L	GF	GA	GD	Win %
Wólczanka Wólka Pelkinska (caretaker)	20 May 2022	30 June 2022	5	1	0	4	4	12	−8	20.00
Motor Lublin	18 March 2024	18 June 2026	82	29	25	28	122	135	−13	35.37
Widzew Łódź	11 September 2026	Present	8	1	4	3	11	12	−1	12.50
Total			95	31	29	35	137	159	−22	32.63

== Honours ==
Individual

- Ekstraklasa Coach of the Month: November 2024, March 2026
