= Patryk Czubak =

Polish football manager (born 1993)

Personal information
- Date of birth: 15 April 1993 (age 33)
- Place of birth: Świnoujście, Poland

Team information
- Current team: Pogoń Szczecin (assistant)

Youth career
- Years: Team
- Flota Świnoujście

Managerial career
- 2021–2023: Widzew Łódź II
- 2023: Stomil Olsztyn
- 2025: Widzew Łódź (caretaker)
- 2025: Widzew Łódź
- 2026: Polonia Bytom

Patryk Czubak (born 15 April 1993) is a Polish professional football manager and former player who is currently the assistant manager of Ekstraklasa club Pogoń Szczecin.

== Coaching career ==
A former youth player for Flota Świnoujście, Czubak began his coaching career while studying at the Poznań University of Physical Education. At the time, he served as an assistant coach of several sides at the Lech Poznań Academy. In 2016, he joined Falubaz Zielona Góra's coaching staff as a match analyst. Two years later, Czubak became part of the methodology and analysis department at Ekstraklasa club Piast Gliwice, and worked as an assistant coach of their under-19 and under-21 teams. He departed in January 2020 to act as a match analyst at Warta Poznań, while simultaneously holding a similar role at the Poland national under-19 team.

== Managerial career ==
=== Widzew Łódź II ===
On 12 July 2021, Czubak was appointed manager of Widzew Łódź's reserve team, playing in the fifth tier, while also taking on the role of the training methology coordinator at the club's academy.

=== Stomil Olsztyn ===
On 26 June 2023, Czubak was announced as the new head coach of II liga club Stomil Olsztyn. On 20 August 2023, he left Stomil for family reasons.

=== Widzew Łódź ===
Soon after, he re-joined Widzew's analysis department, initially working remotely. On 12 March 2024, Czubak became head of the department, and joined the senior team's coaching staff as an assistant.

On 24 February 2025, Czubak took temporary charge of the team after the sacking of Daniel Myśliwiec. He led Widzew to one win, one draw and one loss before the arrival of Željko Sopić on 17 March. In June, Czubak extended his deal with Widzew until the end of the 2028–29 season.

On 26 August 2025, following Sopić's departure, Czubak was appointed permanent manager. On 15 October, after just six games in charge, he was dismissed. He ended his second stint with a record of two league wins, three losses, and a cup win on penalties.

=== Osijek (assistant) ===
On 5 November 2025, Czubak joined Željko Sopić's staff at Croatian side Osijek as an assistant.

=== Polonia Bytom ===
On 5 January 2026, it was announced that Czubak would be the new coach of I liga club Polonia Bytom. He replaced Łukasz Tomczyk who moved to Raków Częstochowa. He departed the club less than three months into his tenure, with a winless record of two draws and four losses.

=== Pogoń Szczecin (assistant) ===
On 27 April 2026, Czubak was named Thomas Thomasberg's assistant at Ekstraklasa club Pogoń Szczecin. He remained at the club after Óscar García's appointment as head coach, and extended his contract until 2029 in August 2026.

== Managerial statistics ==
As of match played 21 March 2026

Managerial record by team and tenure
Team	From	To	Record							
Team	From	To	G	W	D	L	GF	GA	GD	Win %
Widzew Łódź II	12 July 2021	30 June 2023	82	61	12	9	239	70	+169	74.39
Stomil Olsztyn	1 July 2023	20 August 2023	6	1	1	4	5	8	−3	16.67
Widzew Łódź (caretaker)	24 February 2025	17 March 2025	3	1	1	1	2	2	+0	33.33
Widzew Łódź	26 August 2025	15 October 2025	6	2	1	3	11	10	+1	33.33
Polonia Bytom	5 January 2026	26 March 2026	6	0	2	4	6	11	−5	0.00
Total			103	65	17	21	263	101	+162	63.11
