= Marcel Reguła =

Polish footballer (born 2006)

Personal information
- Full name: Marcel Wojciech Reguła
- Date of birth: 26 October 2006 (age 20)
- Place of birth: Legnica, Poland
- Height: 1.81 m (5 ft 11 in)
- Position: Attacking midfielder

Team information
- Current team: Zagłębie Lubin
- Number: 44

Youth career
- AKS Strzegom
- –2016: Park Targoszyn
- 2016–2023: Zagłębie Lubin

Senior career*
Years	Team	Apps	(Gls)
2023–2025	Zagłębie Lubin II	24	(3)
2024–	Zagłębie Lubin	54	(11)

International career^{‡}
2023	Poland U17	4	(1)
2023–2024	Poland U18	7	(4)
2024–2025	Poland U19	9	(0)
2025–	Poland U21	7	(2)
2026–	Poland	4	(1)
- * Club domestic league appearances and goals as of 08:45, 9 November 2026 (UTC) ‡ National team caps and goals as of 23:23, 17 November 2026 (UTC)

Marcel Wojciech Reguła (born 26 October 2006) is a Polish professional footballer who plays as an attacking midfielder for Ekstraklasa club Zagłębie Lubin and the Poland national team.

== Club career ==
=== Youth career ===
Marcel Reguła began his youth career with AKS Strzegom. He then moved to the youth teams of Park Targoszyn. In October 2016, he joined the Zagłębie Lubin academy. At that time, he played as a winger and central midfielder.

=== Zagłębie Lubin ===
Reguła made his first senior appearance for Zagłębie's reserve team on 6 August 2023 in a 1–1 II liga draw against Hutnik Kraków. He scored his first third-tier goal in the 80th minute of a 1–2 defeat against Olimpia Grudziądz on 30 March 2024. He ended the 2023–24 campaign with 15 appearances and one goal.

On 15 September 2024, he scored a double in a league game against ŁKS Łódź II. Eleven days later, on 26 September, he made his debut for Zagłębie's first team in a Polish Cup fixture against Podbeskidzie Bielsko-Biała. Reguła came on as a substitute in the 80th minute, replacing Mateusz Wdowiak. Following a 0–0 draw, Zagłębie won the match 4–3 in a penalty shootout.

On 27 October 2024, Reguła made his Ekstraklasa debut as a substitute in a 2–2 draw against Stal Mielec. A week later, on 4 November, he scored his first goal for Zagłębie, a bicycle kick in the 84th minute of a 3–0 win against Śląsk Wrocław.

On 23 December 2024, Reguła extended his contract with Zagłębie until the end of June 2028. He finished the 2024–25 season with 11 senior team appearances, including nine in the league, and one goal scored.

The 2025–26 season saw Reguła break into Zagłębie's starting line-up, and he ended the campaign with seven goals and five assists in 32 appearances across all competitions. For his efforts, he was named the Ekstraklasa Young Player of the Season in May 2026.

== International career ==
He was called up to the training camps of the Poland U15 and U16 teams.

On 6 September 2023, he made his debut for the Poland under-18 team against Croatia, scoring his first goal in the 49th minute of a 4–4 draw. He was a member of the under-17s roster for the 2023 FIFA U-17 World Cup, and he scored Poland's only goal at the tournament in a 1–4 group stage loss to Senegal on 14 November. On 5 September 2024, he made his first appearance for the under-19s as a substitute in a 2–0 win over Kazakhstan.

On 5 September 2025, Reguła made his debut for the under-21 team in a 3–0 win over North Macedonia; he scored in the 65th minute to make it 2–0 from Tomasz Pieńko's assist.

Reguła received his maiden call-up to the Poland senior team on 18 September 2026, for UEFA Nations League matches against Bosnia and Herzegovina, Sweden and Romania. He made his first appearance for Poland as a substitute in a 6–0 win over Romania on 2 October. He scored his first goal for Poland in the return game on 14 November, which Poland lost 2–1.

== Career statistics ==
=== Club ===
As of match played 8 November 2026

Appearances and goals by club, season and competition
Club	Season	League			Polish Cup		Europe		Other		Total	
Club	Season	Division	Apps	Goals	Apps	Goals	Apps	Goals	Apps	Goals	Apps	Goals
Zagłębie Lubin II	2023–24	II liga	15	1	0	0	—		—		15	1
Zagłębie Lubin II	2024–25	II liga	9	2	0	0	—		—		9	2
Zagłębie Lubin II	Total		24	3	0	0	—		—		24	3
Zagłębie Lubin	2024–25	Ekstraklasa	9	1	2	0	—		—		11	1
Zagłębie Lubin	2025–26	Ekstraklasa	31	5	1	2	—		—		32	7
Zagłębie Lubin	2026–27	Ekstraklasa	14	5	0	0	—		—		14	5
Zagłębie Lubin	Total		54	11	3	2	—		—		57	13
Career total			78	14	3	2	0	0	0	0	81	16

=== International ===
As of match played 17 November 2026

Appearances and goals by national team and year
National team	Year	Apps	Goals
Poland	2026	4	1
Total		4	1

Scores and results list Poland's goal tally first, score column indicates score after each Reguła goal.

List of international goals scored by Marcel Reguła
No.	Date	Venue	Opponent	Score	Result	Competition
1	14 November 2026	Arena Națională, Bucharest, Romania	Romania	1–2	1–2	2026–27 UEFA Nations League B

== Honours ==
Individual

- Ekstraklasa Young Player of the Season: 2025–26
- Ekstraklasa Young Player of the Month: July 2025, October 2025, August 2026
