= Dawid Kroczek =

Polish football manager (born 1989)

Personal information
- Date of birth: 3 May 1989 (age 37)
- Place of birth: Łódź, Poland

Team information
- Current team: Miedź Legnica (manager)

Managerial career
- Years: Team
- 2019–2020: Sokół Aleksandrów Łódzki
- 2021–2022: Resovia
- 2022–2023: Unia Skierniewice
- 2024–2025: Cracovia
- 2026: Raków Częstochowa
- 2026–: Miedź Legnica

Dawid Kroczek (born 3 May 1989) is a Polish professional football manager who is currently in charge of I liga club Miedź Legnica.

== Career ==
Before taking on his first managerial role, Kroczek worked as a coach for UKS SMS Łódź and the Łódzkie Football Association team, and attended internships at Benfica, Karpaty Lviv, Southampton, Zagłębie Lubin, Cracovia, Lechia Gdańsk, Sandecja Nowy Sącz and Valencia.

In mid-2019, he was appointed manager of III liga club Sokół Aleksandrów Łódzki, and led the team to 17 wins and 12 draws in 36 matches, before leaving in December 2020 to join Resovia's staff as an assistant coach under Radosław Mroczkowski.

On 29 September 2021, after Mroczkowski's dismissal, Kroczek took on the role of manager, which he held until the end of the season, which Resovia finished in 11th.

On 27 June 2022, he returned to III liga to manage Unia Skierniewice; with Kroczek in charge, Unia finished the league season 7th in their group, with a record of 15 wins, 8 draws and 11 losses. He left the club by mutual consent one year and a day after his appointment.

In February 2024, he joined Cracovia as a head of methodology department for youth teams, and was due to take charge of Cracovia's reserve side from the start of the 2024–25 season. However, after Jacek Zieliński's sacking following a 2–2 league draw against ŁKS Łódź on 5 April 2024, Kroczek was promoted to the role of interim manager until the end of the campaign. His first game in charge on 14 April ended in an upset 3–1 away win over league leaders Jagiellonia Białystok. On 23 May 2024, the club announced that Kroczek had signed a contract to become a full-time manager of Cracovia until 30 June 2025, with an option for a further year. On 15 May 2025, Cracovia announced Kroczek would depart the club after the conclusion of the 2024–25 season.

In mid-June 2025, Kroczek joined another Ekstraklasa club Raków Częstochowa as their new assistant manager. After the appointment of Łukasz Tomczyk as Raków's manager in December 2025, Kroczek was moved out of the coaching staff into a scouting-related role. On 4 May 2026, he was appointed Raków's manager after Tomczyk's sacking. After leading Raków to three wins in the final four games of the season, Kroczek's deal was extended until June 2028. Raków entered the 2026–27 UEFA Conference League qualifying in the second round; they failed to qualify for the league phase after losing the play-off round to Hajduk Split after extra-time. Domestically, they lost four opening games of the league season. On 31 August, a day after a 5–2 home loss to Jagiellonia Białystok, Kroczek was dismissed by Raków.

On 23 September 2026, Kroczek was announced at I liga club Miedź Legnica on a two-year contract, replacing Janusz Niedźwiedź.

== Managerial statistics ==
As of match played 30 August 2026

Managerial record by team and tenure
Team	From	To	Record							
Team	From	To	G	W	D	L	GF	GA	GD	Win %
Sokół Aleksandrów Łódzki	6 July 2019	2 December 2020	42	20	14	8	78	43	+35	47.62
Resovia	29 September 2021	15 May 2022	26	9	8	9	33	29	+4	34.62
Unia Skierniewice	27 June 2022	28 June 2023	40	21	8	11	69	44	+25	52.50
Cracovia	5 April 2024	30 June 2025	42	17	10	15	70	64	+6	40.48
Raków Częstochowa	4 May 2026	31 August 2026	14	6	2	6	25	20	+5	42.86
Miedź Legnica	23 September 2026	Present	0	0	0	0	0	0	+0	—
Total			164	73	42	49	275	200	+75	44.51

== Honours ==
Unia Skierniewice

- Polish Cup (Łódź regionals): 2022–23
