= Kiko Ramírez =

Spanish footballer and manager

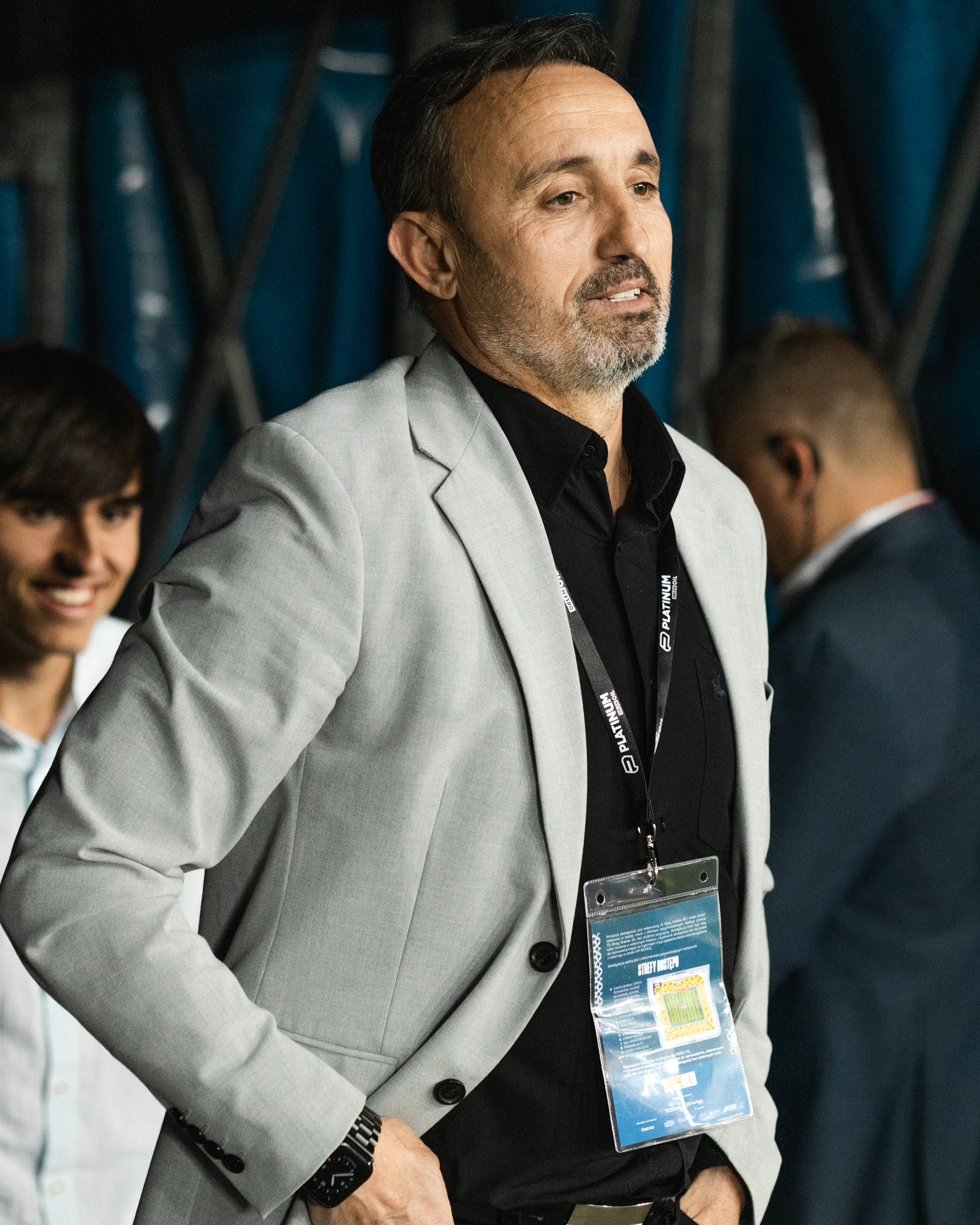
- Ramírez in 2023

Personal information
- Full name: Francisco Ramírez González
- Date of birth: 14 July 1970 (age 56)
- Place of birth: Tarragona, Spain
- Position: Forward

Youth career
- 1982–1989: Gimnàstic

Senior career*
Years	Team	Apps	(Gls)
1989–1996	Gimnàstic	126	(24)
1992–1993	→ Mollerussa (loan)	38	(15)
1996–1997	Sabadell	35	(18)
1997	Ceutí Atlético	0	(0)
1997–1998	Málaga	30	(4)
1998	Ceuta	13	(1)
1999	Cartagonova	7	(0)
1999–2000	Novelda	29	(3)
2000–2002	Tàrrega	55	(18)
Total		333	(83)

Managerial career
- 2007–2010: Gimnàstic (youth)
- 2010–2012: Pobla Mafumet
- 2012–2013: Gimnàstic
- 2013–2015: Hospitalet
- 2015–2016: Castellón
- 2017–2018: Wisła Kraków
- 2018–2019: Sabadell
- 2019–2021: Xanthi
- 2021–2022: Odisha
- 2025–2026: Radomiak Radom (assistant)
- 2026: Radomiak Radom
- 2026: Teruel
- * Club domestic league appearances and goals

Francisco "Kiko" Ramírez González (born 14 July 1970) is a Spanish professional football manager and former player who played as a forward.

== Playing career ==
Born in Tarragona, Catalonia, Ramírez never competed in higher than Segunda División B. He began his career with Gimnàstic de Tarragona in 1989, but never managed to establish himself as a regular starter, only featuring more regularly after a loan to CFJ Mollerussa; his best input came in the 1993–94 season, where he scored 12 goals in 33 matches.

Ramírez subsequently represented CE Sabadell FC, Málaga CF, AD Ceuta, Cartagonova CF, Novelda CF and UE Tàrrega, retiring with the latter side in 2002 at the age of 32. He scored a career-best 18 goals in 1996–97 while at Sabadell, and achieved his only promotion with Málaga the following campaign.

== Coaching career ==
Ramírez took up coaching after retiring, acting as assistant at his first club Gimnàstic until 2007. In May 2010, after three years in charge of the Juvenil squad, he was appointed manager of the farm team, CF Pobla de Mafumet from Tercera División.

On 23 June 2012, Ramírez took the reins of the first team, recently relegated from Segunda División. He was sacked on 14 October, after only one win in eight matches.

In October 2013, Ramírez was named CE L'Hospitalet manager. He finished his first season as second, but missed out on promotion in the play-offs.

Ramírez renewed with Hospi on 27 June 2014, but left the club the following 10 May after finishing out of the play-off places. On 20 October 2015, he took charge of CD Castellón in the fourth division. He led them to a third-place finish in the regular season, but fell short in the play-offs to CF Gavà, on penalties, thus resigning on 3 July 2016.

On 3 January 2017, Ramírez moved abroad for the first time in his career, after being named manager of Polish Ekstraklasa side Wisła Kraków. He was replaced on 11 December that year by compatriot Joan Carrillo.

Ramírez returned to his native region in January 2019, taking over at his former employers Sabadell. He was dismissed on 2 April, having taken seven points from 11 games and with the team in the relegation zone to the fourth tier.

In the following years, Ramírez worked in the Super League Greece and the Indian Super League. He was relieved of his duties at Odisha FC on 14 January 2022, after just two wins in the last seven matches.

Ramírez returned to Poland and Wisła on 5 December 2022, taking on the role of sporting director until the end of the season. Since his hiring, the club's transfer activity was mainly focused on bringing in Spanish players who were out of contract; for three consecutive transfer windows, eleven of his countrymen were brought in, and also-Spaniard Albert Rudé was appointed as manager in December 2023.

During Ramírez's eighteen-month tenure, the side unexpectedly won the 2023–24 edition of the Polish Cup, but failed to earn promotion from I liga twice. On 28 May 2024, he left by mutual consent.

In late October 2025, Ramirez joined Radomiak Radom as assistant under Gonçalo Feio, his former sidekick at Wisła and Xanthi. On 10 March 2026, the former was appointed head coach after the latter's resignation, being in charge for two games before being replaced by Bruno Baltazar.

On 6 June 2026, Ramírez returned to Spain as head coach of Primera Federación side CD Teruel. On 28 October, having overseen just one win in nine fixtures, he was fired.

== Managerial statistics ==
As of 28 October 2026

Managerial record by team and tenure
Team	Nat	From	To	Record								Ref
Team	Nat	From	To	G	W	D	L	GF	GA	GD	Win %	Ref
Pobla Mafumet	(Spain)	20 May 2010	30 June 2012	83	42	21	20	123	69	+54	50.60	
Gimnàstic	(Spain)	30 June 2012	14 October 2012	9	1	4	4	10	12	−2	11.11	
Hospitalet	(Spain)	16 October 2013	18 May 2015	78	36	23	19	105	70	+35	46.15	
Castellón	(Spain)	20 October 2015	4 July 2016	34	21	9	4	57	46	+11	61.76	
Wisła Kraków	(Poland)	3 January 2017	10 December 2017	38	16	6	16	51	47	+4	42.11	
Sabadell	(Spain)	15 January 2019	1 April 2019	11	1	4	6	6	19	−13	9.09	
Xanthi	(Greece)	20 May 2019	25 November 2019	12	5	1	6	12	15	−3	41.67	
Odisha	(India)	20 July 2021	14 January 2022	10	4	1	5	18	24	−6	40.00	
Radomiak Radom	(Poland)	10 March 2026	27 March 2026	2	0	1	1	2	4	−2	0.00	
Teruel	(Spain)	6 June 2026	28 October 2026	9	1	3	5	4	15	−11	11.11	
Total				285	127	73	85	385	318	+67	44.56	
