= Bruno Baltazar =

Portuguese footballer and manager

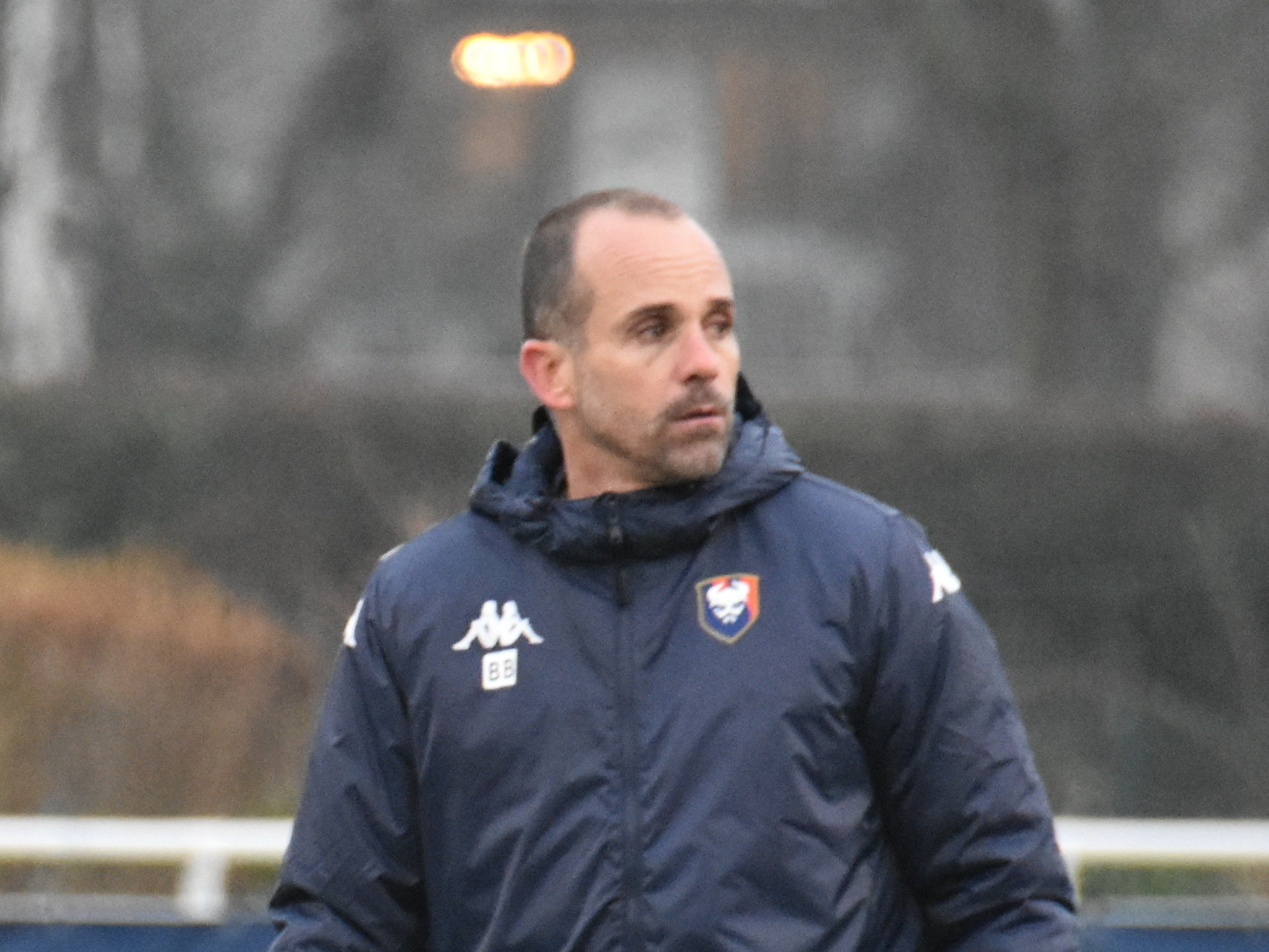
- Bruno Baltazar in 2024

Personal information
- Full name: Bruno Miguel Nunes Baltazar
- Date of birth: 6 July 1977 (age 49)
- Place of birth: Lisbon, Portugal
- Height: 1.83 m (6 ft 0 in)
- Position: Centre-back

Youth career
- 1992–1995: Sintrense

Senior career*
Years	Team	Apps	(Gls)
1995–1999	Sintrense	56	(2)
1999–2003	Odivelas	38	(5)
2003	Dresdner SC	12	(1)
2003–2004	Margate	2	(1)
2004	Fátima	11	(1)
2004–2005	Odivelas	30	(2)
2005–2006	Barreirense	7	(0)
2006–2007	Imortal	11	(0)
2007	Abrantes	9	(0)
2007–2008	Real Massamá	29	(3)
2008–2009	Digenis Morphou	21	(1)
2009–2010	Igreja Nova	9	(0)
2010–2011	Sintrense	26	(1)
Total		261	(17)

Managerial career
- 2012–2013: Sintrense
- 2013: Atlético
- 2014–2015: Casa Pia
- 2016–2017: Olhanense
- 2017–2018: AEL Limassol
- 2018: APOEL
- 2019: Estoril
- 2021–2023: Rochester New York
- 2023: Botev Plovdiv
- 2024: Radomiak Radom
- 2024–2025: Caen
- 2026: Radomiak Radom
- * Club domestic league appearances and goals

Bruno Miguel Nunes Baltazar (born 6 July 1977) is a Portuguese professional football manager and former player who played as a centre-back. He was most recently in charge of Ekstraklasa club Radomiak Radom.

== Playing career ==
Born in Lisbon, Baltazar started his career with local S.U. Sintrense after having already played youth football there. He then switched to Odivelas FC, representing both clubs in the third and fourth divisions and having his first adventure abroad with Dresdner SC in Germany's Regionalliga Nord.

Baltazar started the 2003–04 season still abroad, playing in the English Football Conference with Margate. He returned to his country in the following transfer window, joining C.D. Fátima in the third level, then spent a further campaign in that tier with former side Odivelas.

Baltazar's only experience in the professionals came in 2005–06, as he appeared in only seven Segunda Liga matches for F.C. Barreirense and also suffered relegation. He subsequently returned to the lower leagues, representing Imortal DC, Abrantes F.C. – he split the 2006–07 campaign between the two teams – and Real SC.

After another season abroad, with Digenis Akritas Morphou in the Cypriot Second Division, Baltazar returned to Portugal and joined G.D. Igreja Nova in the third division (team relegation and folding). In January 2010, he rejoined Sintrense in the fourth tier, retiring in June of the following year at the age of 34.

== Coaching career ==
After announcing his retirement, Baltazar took up coaching, starting as assistant manager at his first club, Sintrense. In the summer of 2012, he was promoted to head coach, guiding them to promotion to the third division.

In July 2013, Baltazar was appointed at second level side Atlético Clube de Portugal. His stay was however to be short-lived, as he was relieved of his duties after only one month.

Baltazar joined the Philippines national team coaching staff in April 2014, going on to work under Thomas Dooley. He returned to his country shortly after, signing with lowly Casa Pia A.C. as their manager.

In March 2017, after only three months in charge of S.C. Olhanense in the second tier, Baltazar moved to the Cypriot First Division with AEL Limassol. Roughly one year later, in the same capacity, he signed with fellow league club APOEL FC.

Baltazar returned to his country and its second division on 22 January 2019, being appointed at G.D. Estoril Praia. In June, however, he left to become part of the coaching setup at Nottingham Forest following the appointment of Sabri Lamouchi.

On 7 October 2020, Baltazar became the new coach of Al-Ain FC of the Saudi Professional League. Five days later, he announced he could not sign as he was not able to break his contractual relationship with Forest.

Baltazar was appointed head coach of Rochester New York FC on 14 December 2021, ahead of the inaugural MLS Next Pro season. It was announced on 3 January 2023 that he would be leaving the club after 1 season after agreeing to a fee with Bulgarian club Botev Plovdiv.

On 20 May 2024, Polish club Radomiak Radom appointed Baltazar as manager before the final game of the 2023–24 Ekstraklasa. Despite suffering a 1–3 loss to Widzew Łódź on 25 May, Radomiak avoided demotion and finished the season in 15th, one place above relegation spots. On 29 December 2024, Baltazar and Radomiak agreed to part ways after he received an offer from an unnamed club.

Later that day, he was revealed as the new manager of French Ligue 2 club Caen. He was sacked after failing to win a point in his first 7 matches.

On 27 March 2026, Baltazar returned to Radomiak Radom as their manager for the remainder of the 2025–26 season, replacing Kiko Ramírez. Tasked with avoiding relegation again, he led the club to a tenth-place finish, with a record of three wins, two draws and three losses. Baltazar left Radomiak after his contract was terminated by mutual consent on 21 June 2026.

== Managerial statistics ==
As of match played 23 May 2026

Managerial record by team and tenure
Team	From	To	Record							
Team	From	To	P	W	D	L	GF	GA	GD	W%
Olhanense	28 October 2016	6 February 2017	13	3	4	6	13	21	−8	23.1
AEL Limassol	22 March 2017	5 March 2018	41	22	9	10	62	36	+26	53.7
APOEL	22 March 2018	17 September 2018	16	11	2	3	31	17	+14	68.8
Estoril	22 January 2019	30 June 2019	16	7	3	6	21	23	−2	43.8
Rochester New York	15 December 2021	2 January 2023	28	16	0	12	72	66	+6	57.1
Botev Plovdiv	3 January 2023	23 May 2023	15	3	4	8	13	20	−7	20.0
Radomiak Radom	20 May 2024	29 December 2024	21	7	2	12	25	32	−7	33.3
Caen	29 December 2024	18 February 2025	7	0	0	7	1	11	−10	0.0
Radomiak Radom	27 March 2026	21 June 2026	8	3	2	3	10	13	−3	37.5
Total			165	72	26	67	248	239	+9	43.6

== Honours ==
=== Manager ===
APOEL

- Cypriot First Division: 2017–18
