= Max Mölder =

Swedisg footballer and manager (born 1984)

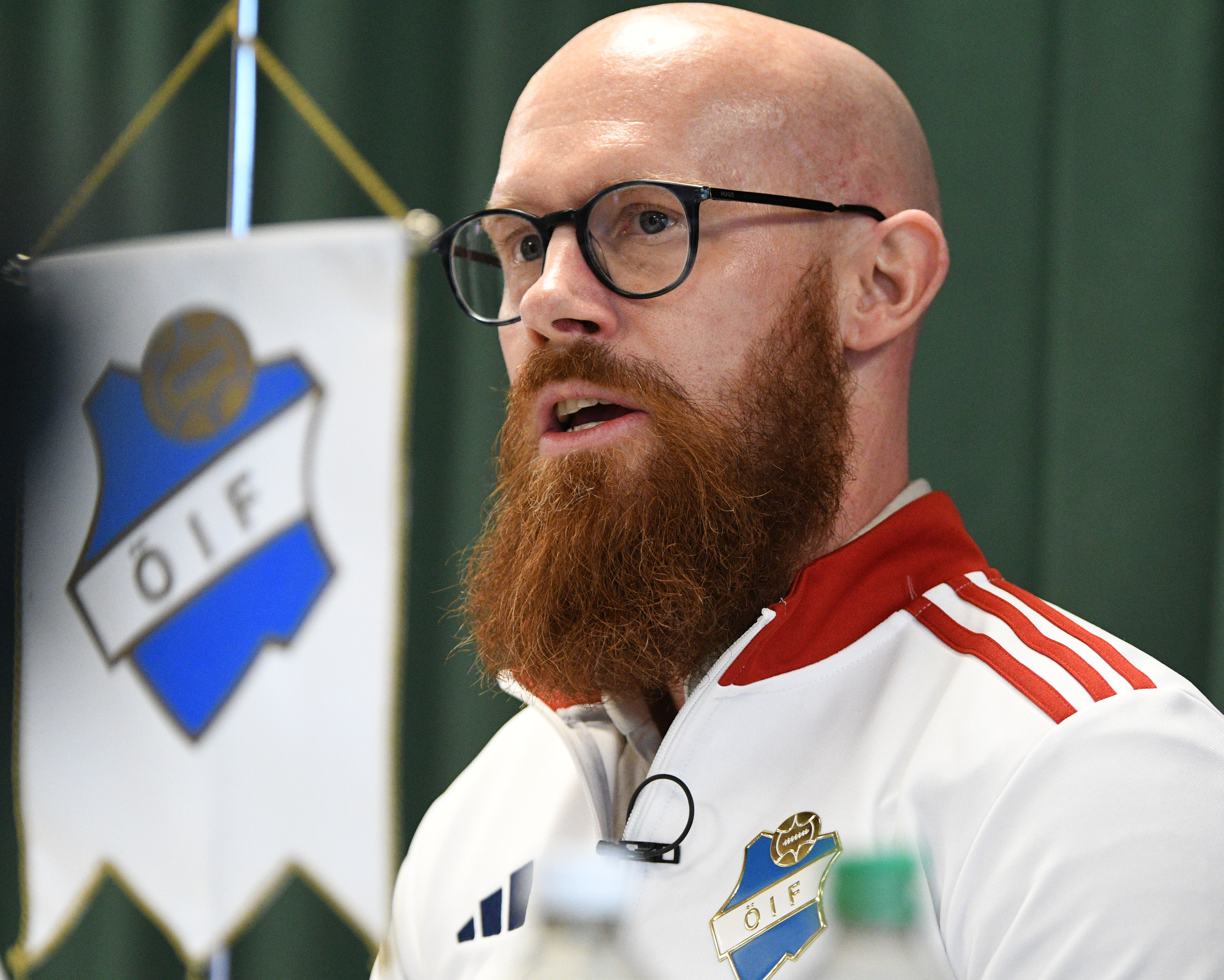
- Mölder presented as Östers IF coach in 2025

Personal information
- Date of birth: 14 November 1984 (age 41)
- Place of birth: Stockholm, Sweden
- Height: 1.73 m (5 ft 8 in)
- Position: Defender

Team information
- Current team: Östers IF (manager)

Senior career*
Years	Team	Apps	(Gls)
2007–2008	Ängelholms FF		
2008–2013	Landskrona BoIS	137	(1)
2014	AB		
2015	Hittarps IK	9	(0)

Managerial career
- 2014–2017: Hittarps IK
- 2018: Lyngby BK (assistant)
- 2019–2023: Landskrona BoIS (assistant)
- 2023–2025: Landskrona BoIS
- 2025: Piast Gliwice
- 2026–: Östers IF
- * Club domestic league appearances and goals

Max Mölder (born 14 November 1984) is a Swedish professional football manager and former player who played as a defender. He is currently the manager of Superettan club Östers IF.

== Managerial statistics ==
As of match played 19 October 2025

Managerial record by team and tenure
Team	From	To	Record							
Team	From	To	G	W	D	L	GF	GA	GD	Win %
Piast Gliwice	1 July 2025	23 October 2025	11	2	4	5	10	13	−3	18.18
Östers IF	1 January 2026	Present	0	0	0	0	0	0	+0	—
Total			11	2	4	5	10	13	−3	18.18

== Honours ==
=== Managerial ===
Hittarps IK

- Division 3 Sydvästra Götaland: 2016

Individual

- Superettan Coach of the Month: April 2024, May 2024, June 2024
