= Łukasz Tomczyk =

Polish football manager (born 1988)

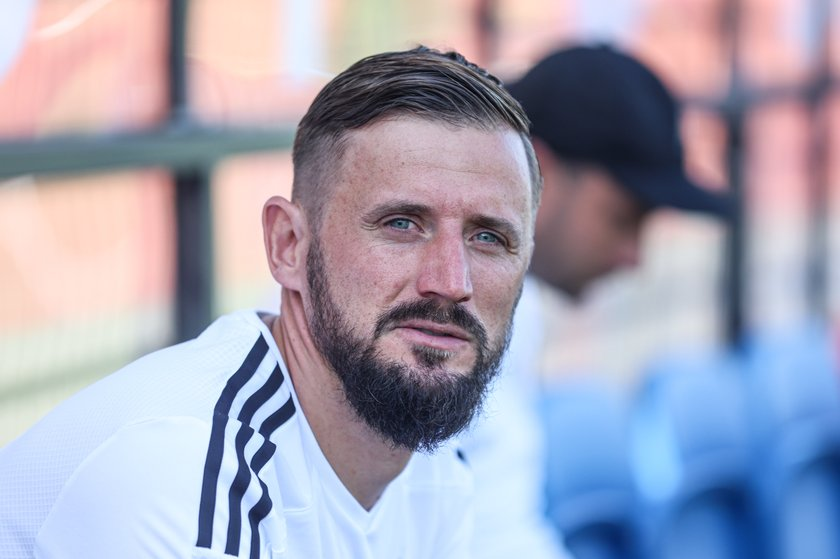
- Tomczyk in 2024

Personal information
- Date of birth: 1 November 1988 (age 38)
- Place of birth: Częstochowa, Poland

Team information
- Current team: Wieczysta Kraków (assistant)

Managerial career
- Years: Team
- 2019–2021: Victoria Częstochowa
- 2023–2025: Polonia Bytom
- 2025–2026: Raków Częstochowa
- 2026: Odra Opole

Łukasz Tomczyk (born 1 November 1988) is a Polish professional football manager who is currently the assistant coach of Ekstraklasa club Wieczysta Kraków.

== Career ==
Tomczyk started his coaching career at Raków Częstochowa, spending eight years in their academy. In 2018, he moved to Wisła Kraków, where he worked as an academy coordinator and the assistant coach of their under-15 team.

=== Victoria Częstochowa ===
In the summer of 2019, Tomczyk took on his first senior coaching role, taking charge of then-seventh tier club Victoria Częstochowa. In 2021, he led Victoria to a group win and promotion to the regional league. At the time of his departure in early November 2021, Victoria were leading their regional league group.

=== Assistant roles ===
On 9 November 2021, Tomczyk joined I liga club Resovia's coaching staff as an assistant under Dawid Kroczek, focusing on match analysis. He left the club at the end of the season.

On 27 October 2022, Tomczyk took on the same role at fellow second-tier club GKS Katowice under manager Rafał Górak. On 6 July 2023, he joined II liga club Polonia Bytom as a match analyst and individual training coach.

=== Polonia Bytom ===
On 26 September 2023, Tomczyk was promoted to the role of head coach at Polonia Bytom after Adam Burek's dismissal. In his first season in charge, he led Polonia from the relegation zone to a sixth-place finish and promotion play-offs, where they lost to KKS Kalisz in the semi-finals.

In the following campaign, Tomczyk guided Polonia to promotion back to the second tier after twelve years of absence. They finished the season as league champions, three points ahead of Pogoń Grodzisk Mazowiecki. On 7 December 2025, he managed his final match for Polonia, a 2–0 league win over Chrobry Głogów, which left the club sitting 2nd in the table ahead of the winter break.

=== Raków Częstochowa ===
On 22 December 2025, Tomczyk became the new manager of Ekstraklasa club Raków Częstochowa, replacing the outgoing Marek Papszun. He signed an eighteen-month contract, with an option for another three years. On 3 May 2026, a day after losing the 2025–26 Polish Cup final, Tomczyk was sacked. He left Raków with a record of five wins, six draws and six losses.

=== Odra Opole ===
On 2 June 2026, I liga club Odra Opole announced Tomczyk as their new head coach, on a two-year deal with an option for another year. Tomczyk lost his first game as Odra Opole manager 1–0 to Arka Gdynia, soon followed by a win over Chrobry Głogów. After winning three of the following eleven games, Odra announced they had terminated Tomczyk's contract on 26 October.

=== Wieczysta Kraków (assistant) ===
On 10 November 2026, Tomczyk joined Ekstraklasa club Wieczysta Kraków as an assistant to the newly appointed head coach Jacek Zieliński.

== Managerial statistics ==
As of match played 25 October 2026

Managerial record by team and tenure
Team	From	To	Record							
Team	From	To	G	W	D	L	GF	GA	GD	Win %
Victoria Częstochowa	July 2019	7 November 2021	57	42	5	10	221	64	+157	73.68
Polonia Bytom	26 September 2023	22 December 2025	86	49	19	18	179	103	+76	56.98
Raków Częstochowa	22 December 2025	3 May 2026	17	5	6	6	25	25	+0	29.41
Odra Opole	2 June 2026	26 October 2026	13	4	3	6	10	14	−4	30.77
Total			173	100	33	40	435	206	+229	57.80

== Honours ==
Victoria Częstochowa

- Klasa A Częstochowa I: 2020–21

Polonia Bytom

- II liga: 2024–25
