= Daniel Myśliwiec =

Polish football manager (born 1985)

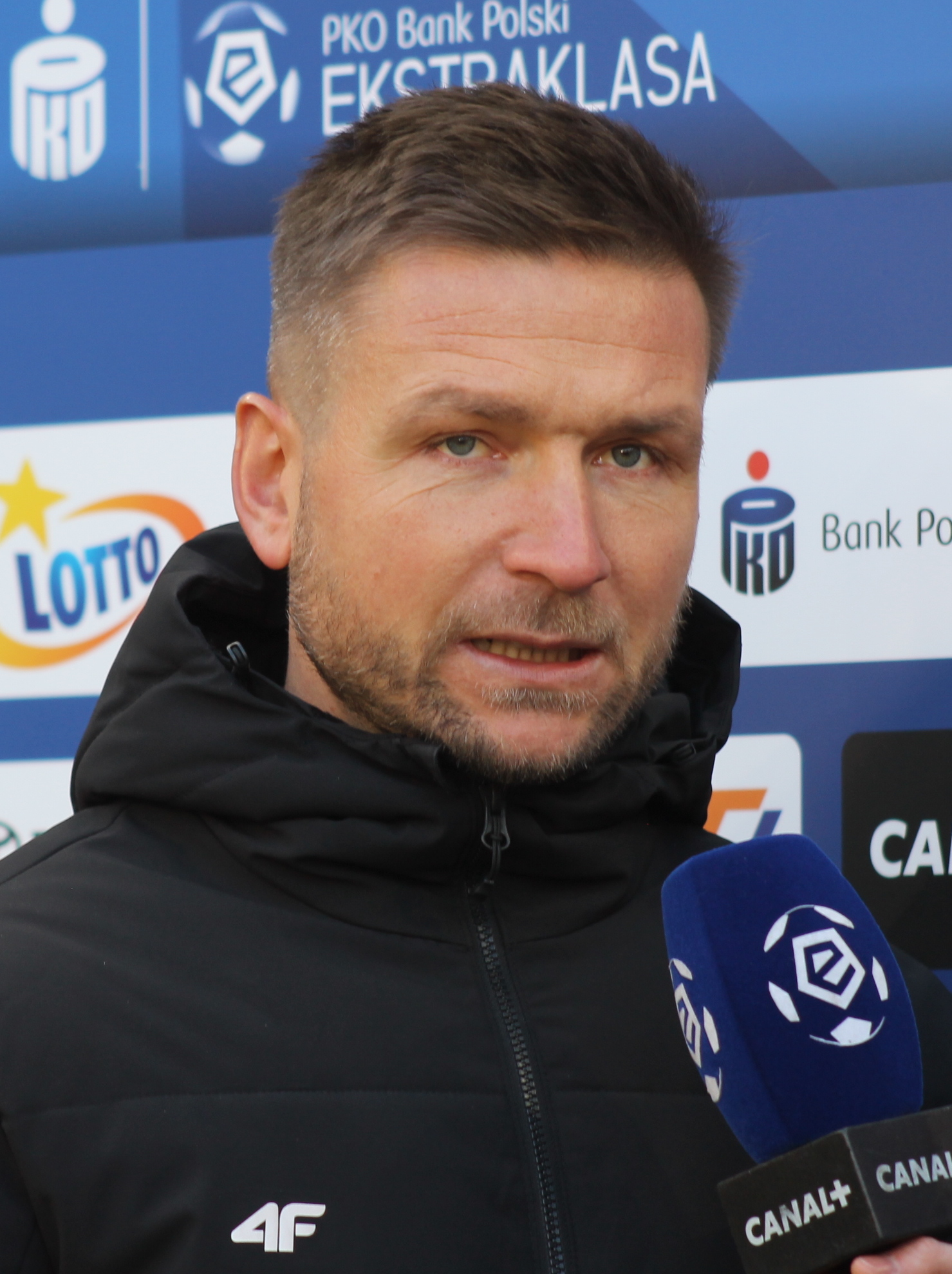
- Myśliwiec as manager of Piast Gliwice

Personal information
- Date of birth: 19 November 1985 (age 41)
- Place of birth: Jasło, Poland
- Position: Defender

Team information
- Current team: Piast Gliwice (manager)

Senior career*
Years	Team	Apps	(Gls)
- Czarni Jasło
2009–2010	Strzelec Frysztak		

Managerial career
- 2009–2010: Strzelec Frysztak (player-manager)
- 2018–2019: Lechia Tomaszów Mazowiecki
- 2019–2020: Lechia Tomaszów Mazowiecki
- 2020: Wólczanka Wólka Pełkińska
- 2020–2023: Stal Rzeszów
- 2023–2025: Widzew Łódź
- 2025–: Piast Gliwice
- * Club domestic league appearances and goals

Daniel Myśliwiec (born 19 November 1985) is a Polish professional football manager and former player who is currently the manager of Ekstraklasa club Piast Gliwice.

== Career ==
=== Early years ===
Myśliwiec played football at amateur level, before moving to Kraków to attend university. After completing his studies in 2009, he became a player-manager of Klasa A club Strzelec Frysztak. Myśliwiec was remembered in Frysztak for a level of commitment and preparation unusual for amateur level football, conducting in-depth tactical and set-piece training, giving pre-match debriefs, as well as procuring pre-match clothing for his players, and, when necessary, maintaining the pitch.

He left the team in December 2010 to intern as a coach for Escola Varsovia Warsaw, before joining Legia Warsaw's academy in 2011. After five years with Legia's youth teams, he joined their senior technical staff as a match analyst in 2016. On 28 July 2017, he moved to Górnik Łęczna to operate as an assistant in Tomasz Kafarski's staff, later working with head coaches Bogusław Baniak and Sławomir Nazaruk. In 2018, he took on the same role at Chojniczanka Chojnice, working under Przemysław Cecherz and Maciej Bartoszek.

=== Lechia Tomaszów Mazowiecki ===
On 29 December 2018, he took on his first professional managerial role when he took charge of III liga club Lechia Tomaszów Mazowiecki. He managed the team in 17 league games, winning nine times, drawing and losing four games each, before leaving at the end of the season to join Jacek Zieliński's staff at Arka Gdynia as an assistant.

After leaving Arka on 31 October 2019, Myśliwiec rejoined Lechia the following day on a six-month contract. After just five matches in charge, the III liga season was suspended indefinitely on 12 March 2020 due to the COVID-19 pandemic, and he left the club at the end of his contract.

Despite short stins, Myśliwiec left a good impression in Tomaszów Mazowiecki; he was later remembered by former Lechia players for a similar level of commitment that he had previously shown in Strzelec; servicing the pitch, hosting thorough one-on-one talks and introducing mandatory nutrition for both senior and youth players. On 16 September 2023, when visiting Lechia to observe Widzew's upcoming opponents, Concordia Elbląg, he was greeted by the club management and former underlings, while home fans chanted his name during the game.

=== Wólczanka Wólka Pełkińska ===
On 4 July 2020, III liga club Wólczanka Wólka Pełkińska announced the appointment of Myśliwiec. At the end of his tenure, Wólczanka was placed 5th in their group with 11 wins, 3 draws and 6 losses.

=== Stal Rzeszów ===
On 19 December 2020, Myśliwiec moved to II liga club Stal Rzeszów. In his second season in charge, he led Stal to a league title and promotion to I liga. After finishing the 2022–23 campaign in 6th and losing in the first round of promotion play-offs, Myśliwiec announced he would be leaving the club at the end of the season. He terminated his contract by mutual consent on 14 June 2023.

Shortly after his departure from Stal, he joined Legia Warsaw's staff for their pre-season camp.

=== Widzew Łódź ===
On 5 September 2023, Myśliwiec signed a two-year deal to become manager of Ekstraklasa club Widzew Łódź, replacing the outgoing Janusz Niedźwiedź. On 17 September, Widzew defeated Cracovia with a 2–0 scoreline in Myśliwiec's first game as manager. In his first season in charge, he led Widzew to a ninth-place finish, Widzew's best in the top-flight since the 1999–2000 season. After starting off 2025 with one draw and three losses, Myśliwiec was sacked on 24 February 2025.

=== Piast Gliwice ===
On 23 October 2025, Myśliwiec was appointed manager of Ekstraklasa side Piast Gliwice, replacing Max Mölder.

== Managerial statistics ==
As of match played 20 November 2026

Managerial record by team and tenure
Team	From	To	Record							
Team	From	To	G	W	D	L	GF	GA	GD	Win %
Lechia Tomaszów Mazowiecki	29 December 2018	29 June 2019	20	11	4	5	44	33	+11	55.00
Lechia Tomaszów Mazowiecki	1 November 2019	30 June 2020	5	2	1	2	7	8	−1	40.00
Wólczanka Wólka Pełkińska	4 July 2020	19 December 2020	24	15	3	6	75	28	+47	62.50
Stal Rzeszów	19 December 2020	14 June 2023	93	46	22	25	182	138	+44	49.46
Widzew Łódź	5 September 2023	24 February 2025	56	22	12	22	80	80	+0	39.29
Piast Gliwice	23 October 2025	Present	43	19	9	15	64	55	+9	44.19
Total			241	115	51	75	452	342	+110	47.72

== Honours ==
Strzelec Frysztak

- Klasa A Dębica: 2009–10

Stal Rzeszów

- II liga: 2021–22
