= Stadion im. Braci Czachorów =

Stadium in Radom, Poland

Coordinates: 51°23′47″N 21°8′46″E

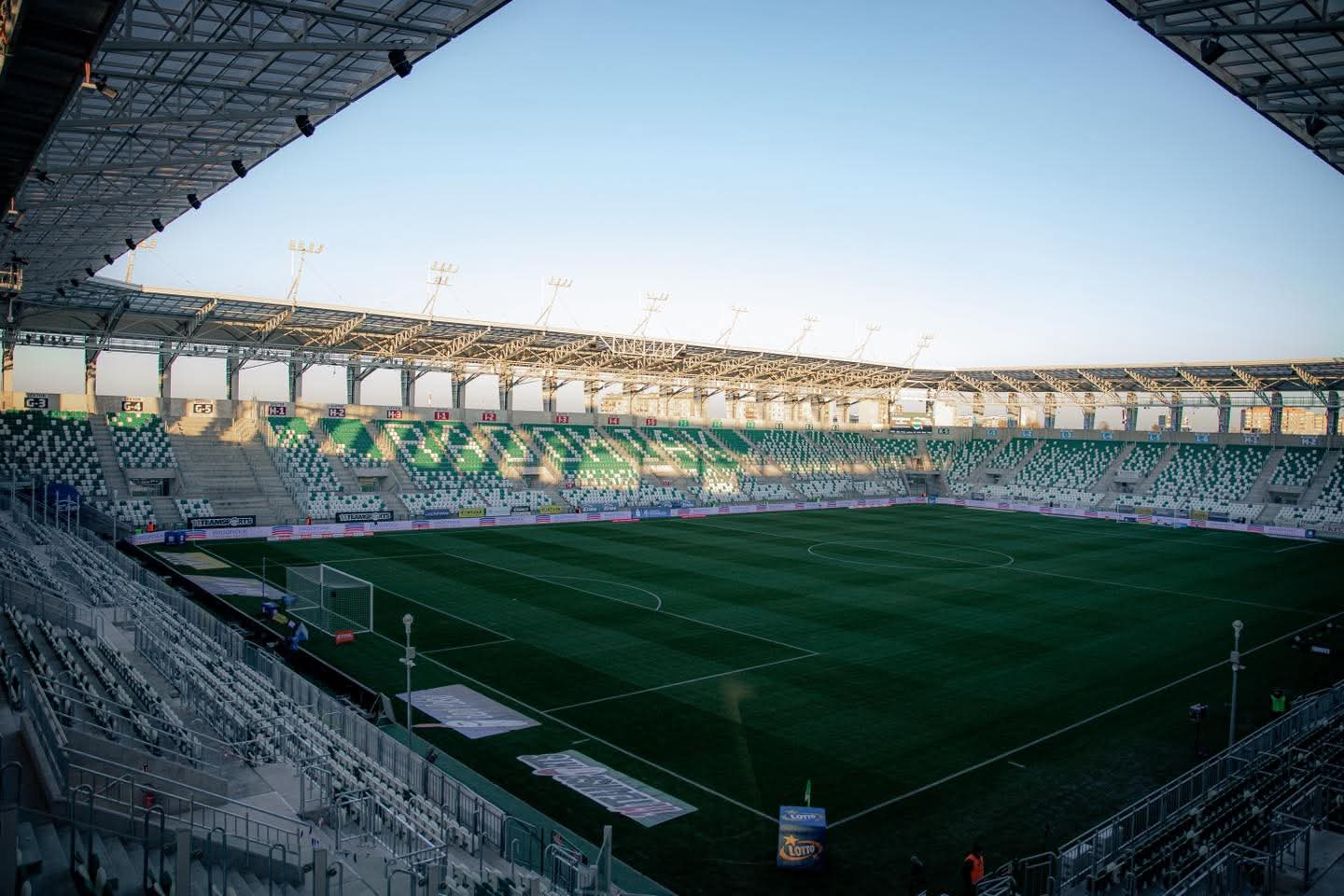
- Interactive map of Stadion im. Braci Czachorów
- Location: Radom, Poland
- Owner: City of Radom
- Operator: MOSiR Radom
- Capacity: 14,440
- Field size: 105.6m x 68.5m

Construction
- Built: 1925
- Renovated: 2017–2023 (first phase)
- Architect: Wojciech Gęsiak

Tenant
- Radomiak Radom

The Radom Municipal Stadium (Polish: Stadion Miejski w Radomiu), also known as the Czachor Brothers Stadium (Polish: Stadion im. Braci Czachorów), is located in Radom, Poland. It is currently used mostly for association football matches and is the home ground of Radomiak Radom. Its reconstruction started in May 2017. It was then reopened in August 2023 for Radomiak's home game against Cracovia.

After the first phase redevelopment, Radomiak returned to the stadium at capacity of 8,840 for the 2023–24 season. It reached its full capacity of 14,440 on 29 November 2025, during a match with Górnik Zabrze During the construction of the facility, Radomiak, who competes in the Ekstraklasa, played its home matches at the Marshal Józef Piłsudski Athletic and Football Stadium at 9 Narutowicza Street from 2015 to 2023.

The old stadium that was located on this site was built in 1925.
