= Gonçalo Feio =

Portuguese coach and former footballer

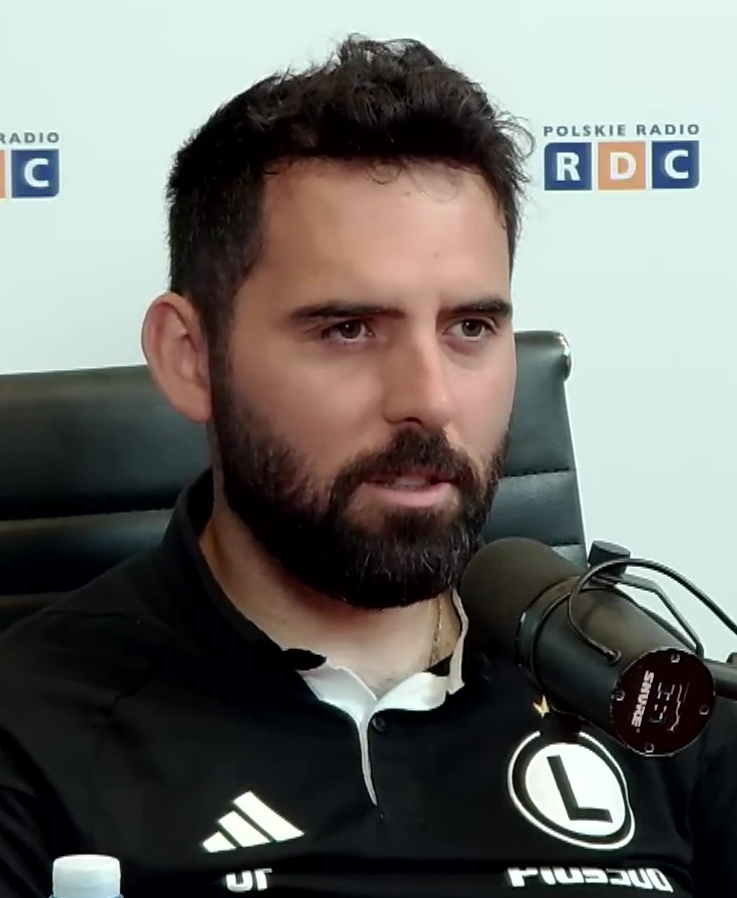
- Feio in 2024 as manager of Legia Warsaw

Personal information
- Full name: Gonçalo Filipe Belchior Feio
- Date of birth: 17 January 1990 (age 36)
- Place of birth: Lisbon, Portugal

Team information
- Current team: Asteras Tripolis (manager)

Youth career
- Years: Team
- Benfica
- Belenenses

Managerial career
- 2010–2014: Legia Warsaw (youth)
- 2022–2024: Motor Lublin
- 2024–2025: Legia Warsaw
- 2025: Dunkerque
- 2025–2026: Radomiak Radom
- 2026: Tondela
- 2026–: Asteras Tripolis

Gonçalo Filipe Belchior Feio (born 17 January 1990) is a Portuguese professional football manager and former player. He is the current manager of Super League Greece club Asteras Tripolis.

Feio was appointed as manager of Motor Lublin in 2022 and of Legia Warsaw in 2024. Under his leadership, Legia won the 2024–25 Polish Cup and reached the quarter-finals of the UEFA Conference League — their deepest European run in years. Despite the sporting success, contract renewal talks with Legia broke down in May 2025. Feio subsequently accepted an offer from French side Dunkerque, taking charge ahead of the 2025–26 Ligue 2 season. However, he left the club after just 23 days, before managing a single competitive match. In October 2025, he returned to Poland to manage Radomiak Radom but departed in March 2026. Shortly after, he took charge of Tondela.

== Playing career ==
He spent his football career in youth teams of Benfica and Belenenses.

== Managerial career ==
=== Early years ===
Feio started his coaching career during his studies at the University of Lisbon. As a first-year student, he won a competition organized by the university for the best work on youth football training. As a part of his reward, he was offered an internship in Benfica's academy, where he worked with under-8 and under-10 youth groups. For one season, he was also an assistant coach of the under-15 team.

In 2010, Feio came to Poland as part of a student exchange between the universities of Lisbon and Warsaw. Initially, in order to afford his stay in Poland, he worked as a language tutor.

In November 2010, he joined Legia Warsaw's academy, working with numerous age groups in both head and assistant coaching positions. In 2014, he joined Legia's senior team staff as a data analyst and later assistant coach, under first team managers Henning Berg and Stanislav Cherchesov. He left Legia in November 2015.

In 2016, he moved to Wisła Kraków, where he worked as a youth coach and assistant coach to first team managers Kiko Ramírez and Joan Carrillo. In 2019, he moved to Super League Greece club Xanthi, where he operated as an assistant coach of Kiko Ramírez. Feio went back to Poland in 2020, finding employment as an assistant to Marek Papszun at Raków Częstochowa. He left Raków following a physical altercation with team manager Kamil Waskowski.

=== Motor Lublin ===
On 19 September 2022, Feio took on his first senior managerial role when he was appointed as manager of II liga club Motor Lublin, who at the time were placed bottom of the league table. With Feio in charge, Motor won the promotion play-offs and returned to I liga after a thirteen-year hiatus.

On 5 March 2023, following a league match against GKS Jastrzębie, Feio insulted Motor's press officer, which led to a confrontation with the club's chairman Paweł Tomczyk, during which Feio attacked him with a desk tray. Tomczyk had to be treated in a hospital, and left the club soon after, along with Maciążek. Motor's owner Zbigniew Jakubas defended Feio during a press conference two days later. For his actions, the Polish Football Association Disciplinary Committee penalised the Portuguese manager with a two-year ban (sentence suspended for a period of one year), a financial fine and ordered him to issue a written apology to both Maciążek and Tomczyk.

He left the club in March 2024, despite Motor overperforming in their first season back in the second division; at the time of Feio's departure, they were placed fifth in the league table.

=== Legia Warsaw ===
On 9 April 2024, following Kosta Runjaić's dismissal, it was reported by the media that Feio was to replace him as manager of Ekstraklasa side Legia Warsaw. A day later, Feio was officially announced by the club, signing a deal until the end of the 2024–25 season.

On 15 August 2024, Legia drew 1–1 at home against Danish Superliga club Brøndby in the third qualifying round of the UEFA Conference League and advanced on aggregate after winning 2–3 away. At the final whistle, Feio made obscene gestures towards the away fans' section, later claiming he was provoked by Brøndby's behaviour towards his team during the first game. Two days later, he released a formal apology. For his actions, UEFA issued Feio with a suspended one-match ban. In the opening match of the 2024–25 UEFA Conference League league phase, Feio led Legia to an 1–0 upset win over Betis on 3 October 2024. Five days later, he was charged with causing minor bodily harm and making criminal threats during the March 2023 incident while working at Motor. Legia reached the quarter-finals of the 2024–25 UEFA Conference League, marking a notable achievement in the club’s recent European history. In this stage, they faced Chelsea; the first leg, played on 10 April 2025 at the Polish Army Stadium, ended in a 3–0 defeat for Legia. However, in the return leg on 17 April 2025 at Stamford Bridge, Legia managed a 2–1 victory. Despite this impressive win, the aggregate score of 4–2 in favour of Chelsea saw Legia ultimately eliminated from the competition. On 2 May 2025, Feio led his team to a 4–3 win over Pogoń Szczecin in the 2024–25 Polish Cup final, securing Legia's 21st national cup win.

On 25 May 2025, one day after finishing the league season in fifth place, it was announced Feio would leave Legia at the end of June after failing to agree on a new contract.

=== Dunkerque ===
On 20 June 2025, Feio was unveiled as the new manager of French Ligue 2 club Dunkerque. He left after 23 days, without having overseen a single official fixture. French media reported that the decision followed tensions during pre-season, including a 5–1 friendly defeat to Boulogne.

=== Radomiak Radom ===
On 30 October 2025, Feio was announced as the new manager of Ekstraklasa club Radomiak Radom on a deal until June 2028, replacing his compatriot João Henriques. On 13 February 2026, he received a red card for accusing referees of match-fixing in the first half of a derby match against Korona Kielce. He was given a five-match ban and fined PLN 20,000 for the incident. On 8 March 2026, after a home loss to GKS Katowice, Feio was involved in an argument with a Radom city councilman Dariusz Wójcik in the club building. Feio allegedly confronted Wójcik about the pitch's condition (Radomiak's venue is operated by the city) and insulted him, resulting in Feio being struck in the face in retaliation, with Wójcik claiming he had done so accidentally. Feio and Wójcik later agreed to not press charges on each other. On 10 March 2026, Feio announced his resignation.

=== Tondela ===
On 29 March 2026, Feio became the new coach of Portuguese top-flight club Tondela. With a record of two wins, two draws and four losses under Feio, Tondela was relegated to Liga Portugal 2 at the end of the 2025–26 season. He left the club in June at the end of his contract.

== Managerial statistics ==
As of match played 8 November 2026

Managerial record by team and tenure
Team	From	To	Record							
Team	From	To	G	W	D	L	GF	GA	GD	Win %
Motor Lublin	19 September 2022	18 March 2024	54	31	10	13	85	52	+33	57.41
Legia Warsaw	9 April 2024	30 June 2025	62	35	12	15	123	72	+51	56.45
Dunkerque	1 July 2025	13 July 2025	0	0	0	0	0	0	—	
Radomiak Radom	30 October 2025	10 March 2026	10	4	3	3	16	12	+4	40.00
Tondela	29 March 2026	26 May 2026	8	2	2	4	8	16	−8	25.00
Asteras Tripolis	3 November 2026	Present	1	0	1	0	1	1	+0	0.00
Total			135	72	28	35	233	153	+80	53.33

== Honours ==
Legia Warsaw

- Polish Cup: 2024–25

Individual

- I liga Coach of the Month: December 2023
