= Jacek Zieliński (footballer, born 1961) =

Polish footballer and coach

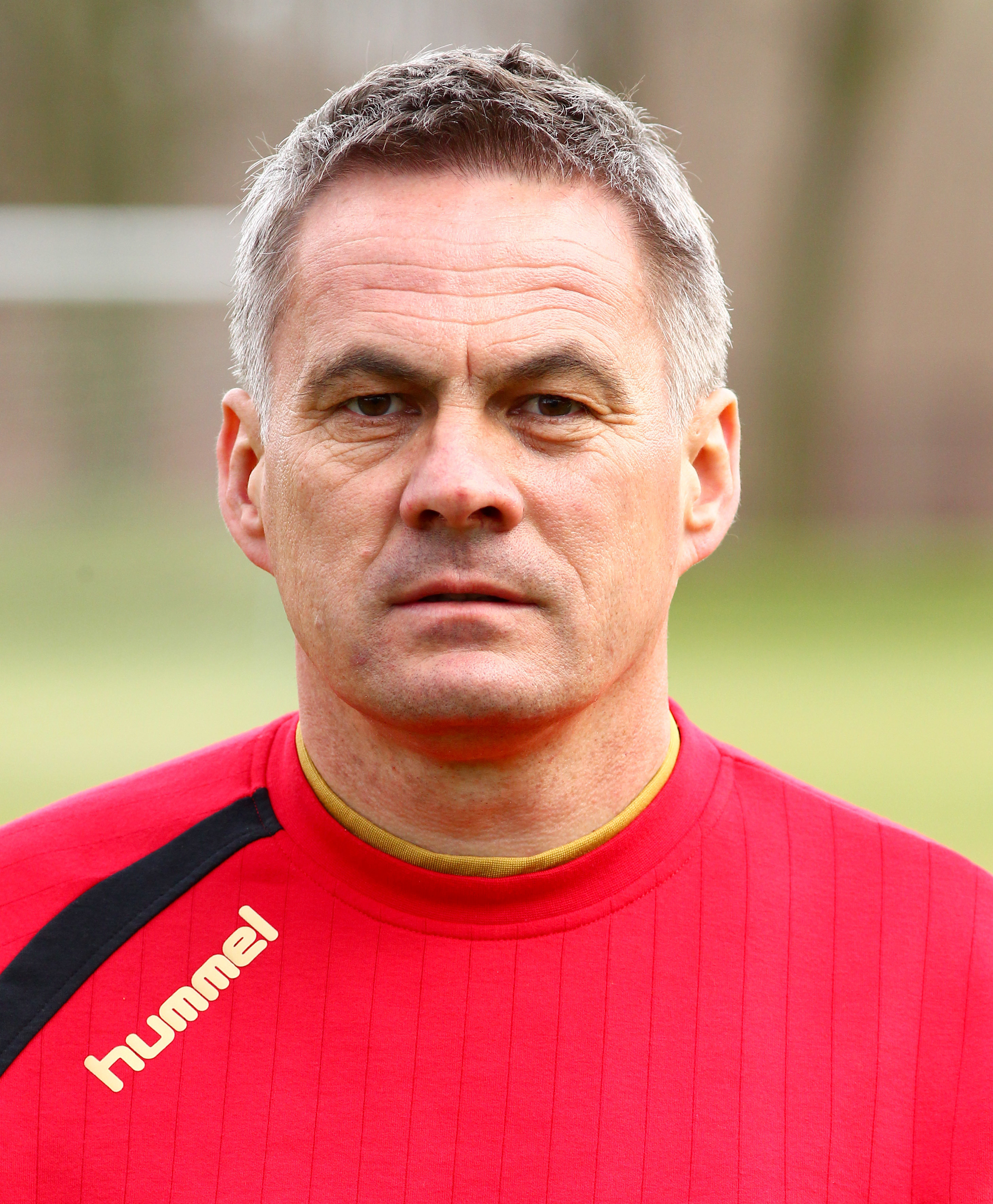
- Zieliński with Polonia Warsaw in 2011

Personal information
- Full name: Jacek Zieliński
- Date of birth: 22 March 1961 (age 65)
- Place of birth: Tarnobrzeg, Poland
- Position: Midfielder

Team information
- Current team: Wieczysta Kraków (manager)

Senior career*
Years	Team	Apps	(Gls)
1976–1979	Siarka Tarnobrzeg		
1980–1984	Gwardia Warsaw		
1984–1993	Siarka Tarnobrzeg		
1993	Stal Stalowa Wola	15	(0)

Managerial career
- 1995: Siarka Tarnobrzeg II
- 1995–1997: Alit Ożarów
- 1998–1999: Siarka Tarnobrzeg
- 2000: Korona Kielce
- 2001: Tłoki Gorzyce
- 2002: GKS Bełchatów
- 2002–2004: Górnik Łęczna
- 2004–2006: Piast Gliwice
- 2006–2007: Odra Wodzisław Śląski
- 2007–2008: Dyskobolia Grodzisk
- 2008–2009: Polonia Warsaw
- 2009–2010: Lech Poznań
- 2011–2012: Polonia Warsaw
- 2012–2013: Ruch Chorzów
- 2015–2017: Cracovia
- 2018: Bruk-Bet Termalica
- 2019: Arka Gdynia
- 2021–2024: Cracovia
- 2024–2026: Korona Kielce
- 2026–: Wieczysta Kraków
- * Club domestic league appearances and goals

Jacek Zieliński (born 22 March 1961) is a Polish professional football manager and former player who is currently in charge of Ekstraklasa club Wieczysta Kraków.

== Playing career ==
Zieliński began his career at Siarka Tarnobrzeg, and became captain in the 1977 season.

== Managerial career ==
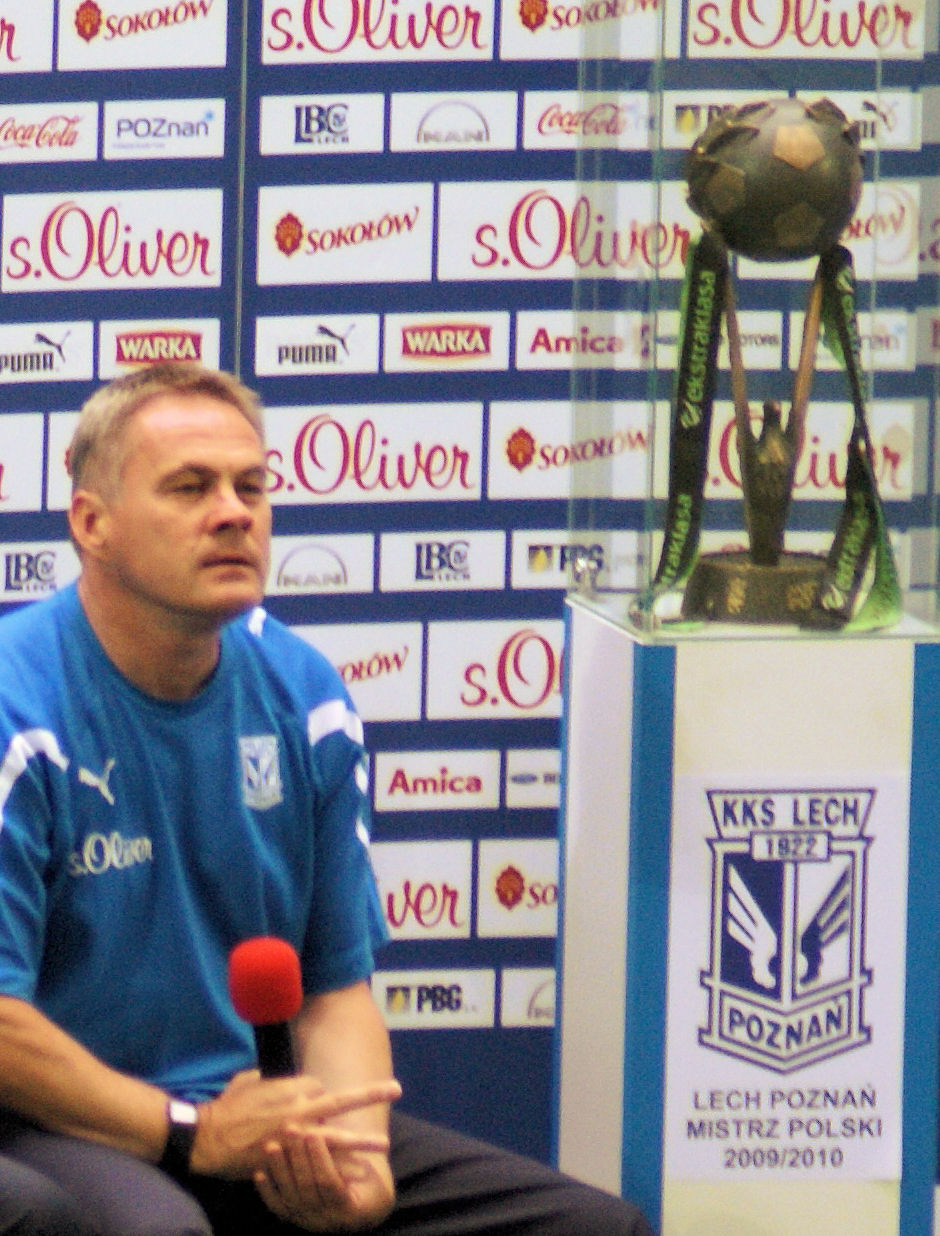
Zieliński as Lech Poznań manager in 2010

Zieliński later took over the manager role at many Polish clubs, such as Korona Kielce, GKS Bełchatów, Górnik Łęczna, Groclin Dyskobolia Grodzisk Wielkopolski, and Polonia Warsaw.

On 5 June 2009, he took over Lech Poznań, where he won the league in his first season with the team. After crashing out of Champions League qualifications in the third round, Zieliński led the team to the top of their Europa League group table after the first two games. However, Lech was underperforming in the league, with the team temporarily stranded at the very bottom of the table. On 2 November 2010, he was dismissed.

On 24 March 2011, he returned to Polonia Warsaw.

After a two-year hiatus, Zieliński returned to Polish football as a manager on 10 November 2021, taking charge of Cracovia for a second time in his career. Following a 2–2 home draw to last-placed ŁKS Łódź on 5 April 2024, he was dismissed.

On 7 August 2024, Zieliński signed a one-year contract to manage Korona Kielce, making his return to the Świętokrzyskie club after 24 years. On 26 May 2025, he extended his deal with Korona for another two seasons. On 18 October 2026, he managed his final match for Korona, suffering a 6–1 loss against his former club Lech Poznań. The following day, the club announced that Zieliński had been sacked.

On 10 November 2026, Zieliński was appointed manager of last-placed Ekstraklasa side Wieczysta Kraków on a deal until the end of the season.

== Managerial statistics ==
As of match played 18 October 2026

Managerial record by team and tenure
Team	From	To	Record							
Team	From	To	G	W	D	L	GF	GA	GD	Win %
GKS Bełchatów	10 June 2002	10 September 2002	7	1	4	2	10	9	+1	14.29
Górnik Łęczna	19 December 2002	15 June 2004	46	23	6	17	44	50	−6	50.00
Piast Gliwice	31 December 2004	14 September 2006	63	25	17	21	78	64	+14	39.68
Odra Wodzisław Śląski	5 December 2006	6 June 2007	18	9	5	4	19	12	+7	50.00
Dyskobolia Grodzisk	6 June 2007	10 July 2008	53	29	14	10	83	42	+41	54.72
Polonia Warsaw	10 July 2008	14 March 2009	28	15	8	5	39	20	+19	53.57
Lech Poznań	5 June 2009	2 November 2010	58	29	14	15	86	47	+39	50.00
Polonia Warsaw	24 March 2011	27 March 2012	36	19	7	10	50	31	+19	52.78
Ruch Chorzów	5 September 2012	16 September 2013	40	11	12	17	51	64	−13	27.50
Cracovia	20 April 2015	19 June 2017	90	34	27	29	141	117	+24	37.78
Bruk-Bet Termalica	20 February 2018	17 September 2018	23	5	5	13	27	46	−19	21.74
Arka Gdynia	12 April 2019	8 October 2019	20	6	5	9	19	27	−8	30.00
Cracovia	10 November 2021	5 April 2024	86	28	29	29	107	102	+5	32.56
Korona Kielce	7 August 2024	19 October 2026	84	31	26	27	100	103	−3	36.90
Wieczysta Kraków	10 November 2026	Present	0	0	0	0	0	0	+0	—
Total			652	265	179	208	854	734	+120	40.64

== Honours ==
=== Manager ===
Dyskobolia Grodzisk

- Ekstraklasa Cup: 2007–08

Lech Poznań

- Ekstraklasa: 2009–10
- Polish Super Cup: 2009

Individual

- Ekstraklasa Coach of the Month: September 2025
