= Janusz Niedźwiedź =

Polish football manager (born 1982)

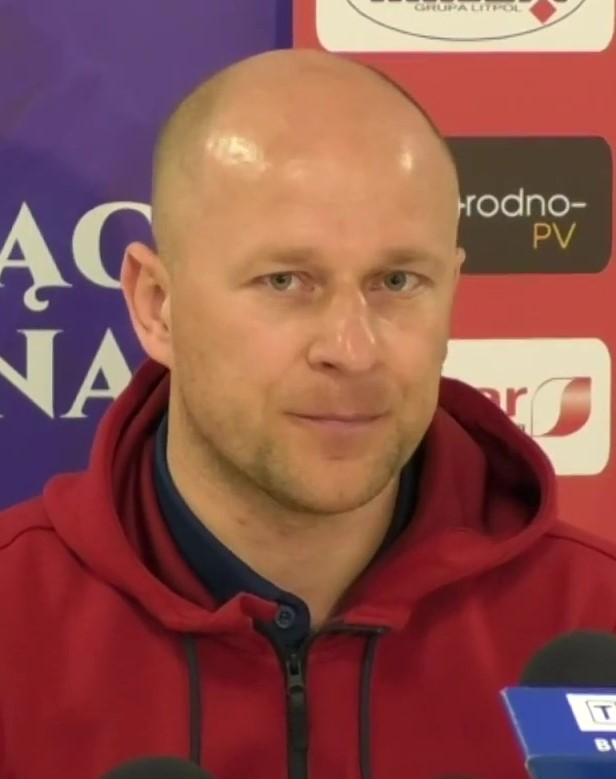
- Niedźwiedź with Górnik Polkowice in 2021

Personal information
- Date of birth: 23 January 1982 (age 44)
- Place of birth: Szczecinek, Poland
- Height: 1.80 m (5 ft 11 in)
- Position: Midfielder

Senior career*
Years	Team	Apps	(Gls)
1999–2003	Amica Wronki II		
2003–2004	Olimpia Elbląg		
2004–2005	Warta Poznań		
2005–2007	Tur Turek		
2008	Polonia Słubice	9	(0)
2008–2009	Mieszko Gniezno	28	(2)
2009–2010	Tur Turek	22	(1)
2011	Olimpia Koło		
2011–2012	Warta Sieradz	16	(0)
2013	Termy Uniejów		

Managerial career
- 2012: Jarota Jarocin
- 2013: Termy Uniejów (player-manager)
- 2013: Radomiak Radom
- 2014: Watra Białka Tatrzańska
- 2015–2017: Jarota Jarocin
- 2017–2018: Podhale Nowy Targ
- 2018–2020: Stal Rzeszów
- 2020: Riteriai
- 2020–2021: Górnik Polkowice
- 2021–2023: Widzew Łódź
- 2023–2024: Ruch Chorzów
- 2024–2025: Stal Mielec
- 2025–2026: Miedź Legnica
- * Club domestic league appearances and goals

Janusz Niedźwiedź (born 23 January 1982) is a Polish professional football manager and former player who was most recently in charge of I liga club Miedź Legnica.

In the summer of 2020, he was appointed manager of A Lyga club FK Riteriai, but left after one week citing "personal and administrative" reasons.

== Managerial statistics ==
As of match played 19 September 2026

Managerial record by team and tenure
Team	From	To	Record							
Team	From	To	G	W	D	L	GF	GA	GD	Win %
Jarota Jarocin	16 April 2012	19 September 2012	18	7	6	5	20	16	+4	38.89
Radomiak Radom	7 May 2013	17 September 2013	18	4	6	8	21	23	−2	22.22
Watra Białka Tatrzańska	3 February 2014	16 December 2014	31	12	9	10	45	37	+8	38.71
Jarota Jarocin	10 June 2015	26 September 2017	81	40	19	22	142	96	+46	49.38
Podhale Nowy Targ	27 September 2017	19 June 2018	29	16	6	7	70	30	+40	55.17
Stal Rzeszów	19 June 2018	9 March 2020	64	37	14	13	155	63	+92	57.81
Riteriai	25 July 2020	31 July 2020	0	0	0	0	0	0	+0	—
Górnik Polkowice	3 August 2020	18 June 2021	37	22	10	5	70	34	+36	59.46
Widzew Łódź	18 June 2021	5 September 2023	79	33	18	28	111	107	+4	41.77
Ruch Chorzów	29 December 2023	24 August 2024	21	6	8	7	24	27	−3	28.57
Stal Mielec	2 September 2024	30 March 2025	20	5	5	10	24	34	−10	25.00
Miedź Legnica	5 August 2025	20 September 2026	43	20	9	14	66	56	+10	46.51
Total			441	202	110	129	748	523	+225	45.80

== Honours ==
=== Player ===
Tur Turek

- III liga, group II: 2006–07

=== Manager ===
Jarota Jarocin

- Polish Cup (Kalisz regionals): 2016–17

Stal Rzeszów

- III liga, group IV: 2018–19
- Polish Cup (Subcarpathia regionals): 2018–19
- Polish Cup (Rzeszów-Dębica regionals): 2018–19

Górnik Polkowice

- II liga: 2020–21
