= 2022–23 Ekstraklasa =

97th season of top-tier football league in Poland

Ekstraklasa
- Season: 2022–23
- Dates: 15 July 2022 – 27 May 2023
- Champions: Raków Częstochowa (1st title)
- Relegated: Miedź Legnica; Lechia Gdańsk; Wisła Płock
- Champions League: Raków Częstochowa
- Europa Conference League: Legia Warsaw; Lech Poznań; Pogoń Szczecin
- Matches: 306
- Goals: 755 (2.47 per match)
- Top goalscorer: Marc Gual (16 goals)
- Biggest home win: Raków 7–1 Wisła (5 November 2022)
- Biggest away win: Warta 0–4 Wisła (22 July 2022)
- Highest scoring: Raków 7–1 Wisła (5 November 2022)
- Longest winning run: 7 matches Raków Częstochowa
- Longest unbeaten run: 18 matches Raków Częstochowa
- Longest winless run: 13 matches Miedź Legnica
- Longest losing run: 5 matches Zagłębie Lubin; Wisła Płock; Lechia Gdańsk
- Highest attendance: 39,123; Lech 2–0 Jagiellonia (27 May 2023)
- Lowest attendance: 1,014 (Note: Matches played at the Stadion Dyskobolii in Grodzisk Wielkopolski.); Warta 2–0 Jagiellonia (15 October 2022); Warta 1–1 Miedź (13 February 2023)
- Total attendance: 2,877,302
- Average attendance: 9,403 ▲27.9%

The 2022–23 Ekstraklasa (also known as PKO Bank Polski Ekstraklasa due to its sponsorship by PKO Bank Polski) was the 97th season of the Polish Football Championship, the 89th season of the highest tier domestic division in the Polish football league system since its establishment in 1927 and the 15th season of the Ekstraklasa under its current title. The league is operated by the Ekstraklasa S.A.

The season was played as a round-robin tournament. A total of 18 teams participated, 15 of which competed in the league campaign during the previous season, while the remaining three was promoted from the 2021–22 I liga. The season began on 15 July 2022 and concluded on 27 May 2023. As the 2022 FIFA World Cup started on 20 November, the league featured an extended pause during the season. As national team players had to be released by their clubs on 14 November 2022, the last Ekstraklasa matchday before the break was played from 11–13 November (matchday 17). The league subsequently resumed on 27 January. Each team played a total of 34 matches, half at home and half away. It was the second season in the formula with 18 teams, instead of 16. The bottom three teams of the final league table will be relegated. It is the sixth Ekstraklasa season to use VAR.

Lech Poznań were the defending champions, who won their 8th Polish title the previous season. Raków Częstochowa clinched their 1st Ekstraklasa title on 7 May after Legia Warsaw lost 1-2 away against Pogoń Szczecin with three games remaining. The season's runner-up was Legia Warsaw, and the third-placed team was Lech Poznań.

== Teams ==
A total of 18 teams participate in the 2022–23 Ekstraklasa season.

=== Changes from last season ===
Wisła Kraków had been relegated to 2022–23 I liga for the first time since the 1993–94 season ending its twenty six-year stay in the top flight. Bruk-Bet Termalica Nieciecza and Górnik Łęczna have been both relegated ending their one-year stay in the top flight. The 2022–23 season is Miedź Legnica’s return to the top flight after 3 years, having last played in the 2018-19 season. On 22 May after a 2–1 win over Podbeskidzie Bielsko-Biała, Widzew Łódź confirmed their promotion returning to the Ekstraklasa after 8 years, having last played in the 2013–14 season and Korona Kielce returned to the Ekstraklasa after 2 years, having last played in the 2019-20 season.

Promoted from 2021–22 I liga	Relegated from 2021–22 Ekstraklasa
▲ Miedź Legnica (1st) ▲ Widzew Łódź (2nd) ▲ Korona Kielce (PO)	▼ Bruk-Bet Termalica Nieciecza (16th) ▼ Wisła Kraków (17th) ▼ Górnik Łęczna (18th)

=== Stadiums and locations ===
Note: Table lists in alphabetical order.

Location of teams in 2022–23 Ekstraklasa.
Location of teams in the Katowice urban area

Team	Location	Venue	Capacity
Cracovia	Kraków	Stadion im. Józefa Piłsudskiego	15,114
Górnik Zabrze	Zabrze	Stadion im. Ernesta Pohla	24,563^{1}
Jagiellonia Białystok	Białystok	Stadion Miejski	22,432
Korona Kielce	Kielce	Suzuki Arena	15,550
Lech Poznań	Poznań	Stadion Poznań	43,269
Lechia Gdańsk	Gdańsk	Polsat Plus Arena Gdańsk	43,615
Legia Warsaw	Warsaw	Stadion Wojska Polskiego	31,800
Miedź Legnica	Legnica	Stadion im. Orła Białego	6,864
Piast Gliwice	Gliwice	Stadion im. Piotra Wieczorka	10,037
Pogoń Szczecin	Szczecin	Stadion im. Floriana Krygiera	21,163
Radomiak Radom	Radom	Stadion Lekkoatletyczno-Piłkarski^{2}	4,501
Raków Częstochowa	Częstochowa	Miejski Stadion Piłkarski Raków	5,500
Stal Mielec	Mielec	Stadion Miejski	6,864
Śląsk Wrocław	Wrocław	Tarczyński Arena Wrocław	45,105
Warta Poznań	Poznań	Stadion Dyskobolii^{3}	5,383
Widzew Łódź	Łódź	Stadion Widzewa	18,018
Wisła Płock	Płock	Orlen Stadion	4,300^{4}
Zagłębie Lubin	Lubin	Stadion Miejski	16,068

1. Upgrading to 31,871.
2. Due to the renovation of Stadion im. Braci Czachorów in Radom, Radomiak will play home matches at the Stadion Lekkoatletyczno-Piłkarski in Radom.
3. Due to the renovation of Dębińska Road Stadium in Poznań, Warta will play home matches at the Stadion Dyskobolii in Grodzisk Wielkopolski.
4. Upgrading to 15,004.

Cracovia	Górnik	Jagiellonia	Korona	Lech	Lechia
Stadion im. Józefa Piłsudskiego	Stadion im. Ernesta Pohla	Stadion Miejski	Suzuki Arena	Stadion Poznań	Polsat Plus Arena Gdańsk
Capacity: 15,114	Capacity: 24,563	Capacity: 22,432	Capacity: 15,550	Capacity: 43,269	Capacity: 43,615
Legia	Miedź	Piast	Pogoń	Radomiak	Raków
Stadion Wojska Polskiego	Stadion im. Orła Białego	Stadion im. Piotra Wieczorka	Stadion im. Floriana Krygiera	Stadion Lekkoatletyczno-Piłkarski	Miejski Stadion Piłkarski Raków
Capacity: 31,800	Capacity: 6,864	Capacity: 10,037	Capacity: 21,163	Capacity: 4,501	Capacity: 5,500
Stal	Śląsk	Warta	Widzew	Wisła	Zagłębie
Stadion Miejski	Tarczyński Arena Wrocław	Stadion Dyskobolii	Stadion Widzewa	Orlen Stadion	Stadion Miejski
Capacity: 6,864	Capacity: 45,105	Capacity: 5,383	Capacity: 18,018	Capacity: 4,300	Capacity: 16,068

=== Personnel and kits ===
All teams have Lotto (brand of Totalizator Sportowy) placed on the center of the chest.

Team	Chairman	Head coach	Appointment Date	Captain	Manufacturer	Strategic sponsor	Other kit sponsors
Cracovia	(Poland) Janusz Filipiak	(Poland) Jacek Zieliński	10 November 2021	(Poland) Kamil Pestka	Puma	Comarch	Kraków^{3}
Górnik Zabrze	(Poland) Dariusz Czernik	(Poland) Jan Urban	18 March 2023	(Slovenia) Erik Janža	Hummel	Węglokoks, Polygon	Superbet^{1}, Schüttflix^{2}, Zabrze^{2}, Zarys^{3}, ggmgastro^{3}
Jagiellonia Białystok	(Poland) Wojciech Pertkiewicz	(Poland) Adrian Siemieniec	4 April 2023	(Poland) Taras Romanczuk	Kappa	Hotel Bartnicki, Kuchnia Wikinga	Białystok^{1}, STS^{2}
Korona Kielce	(Poland) Łukasz Jabłoński	(Poland) Kamil Kuzera	29 October 2022	(Poland) Jacek Kiełb	4F	Suzuki	Lewiatan^{1} ^{3}, Kielce^{2}, Targi Kielce^{2}, GObet^{3}
Lech Poznań	(Poland) Karol Klimczak	(Netherlands) John van den Brom	20 June 2022	(Sweden) Mikael Ishak	Macron	STS	LECH Pils^{1}, Poznań^{2}, Fogo^{3}
Lechia Gdańsk	(Poland) Zbigniew Deptuła	(Spain) David Badía	21 March 2023	(Portugal) Flávio Paixão	Adidas	eToro	Energa^{1} ^{3}, Gdańsk^{2}
Legia Warsaw	(Poland) Dariusz Mioduski	(Germany) Kosta Runjaić	23 May 2022	(Portugal) Josué	Adidas	Plus500	Fortuna^{1}, Królewskie^{2}
Miedź Legnica	(Poland) Tomasz Brusiło	(Poland) Grzegorz Mokry	11 October 2022	(Poland) Szymon Matuszek	Adidas	Votum Energy	Fortuna^{1}
Piast Gliwice	(Poland) Grzegorz Bednarski	(Serbia) Aleksandar Vuković	27 October 2022	(Poland) Jakub Czerwiński	4F	Betclic, Flyingatom	Gliwice^{1}, Verocargo^{2}
Pogoń Szczecin	(Poland) Jarosław Mroczek	(Sweden) Jens Gustafsson	15 June 2022	(Poland) Damian Dąbrowski	Capelli Sport	Betcris	Szczecin^{2}, Toyota^{3}
Radomiak Radom	(Poland) Sławomir Stempniewski	(Romania) Constantin Gâlcă	16 April 2023	(Brazil) Leândro Rossi	Joma	Enea	Radom^{1}, Fortuna^{2}
Raków Częstochowa	(Poland) Piotr Obidziński	(Poland) Marek Papszun	18 April 2016	(Poland) Andrzej Niewulis	4F	x-kom, forBET	Tauron Group^{1},^{2}, Częstochowa^{3}, liberty^{2}, ZPUR^{2}, al.to^{1}, x-kom G4M3R^{3}
Stal Mielec	(Poland) Jacek Klimek	(Poland) Kamil Kiereś	20 March 2023	(Poland) Krystian Getinger	4F	PGE, PZU	PGE^{1}, Mielec^{2}, Podkarpackie^{2}, Metkom^{3}
Śląsk Wrocław	(Poland) Piotr Waśniewski	(Poland) Jacek Magiera	21 April 2023	(Poland) Michał Szromnik	Nike	LV BET	Wrocław^{1}, Wrocław Airport^{2}, #PijKranówkę^{2}, Ycon^{2}, Acana^{3}
Warta Poznań	(Poland) Bartosz Wolny	(Poland) Dawid Szulczek	8 November 2021	(Poland) Bartosz Kieliba	Nike	TOTALbet	AL-KO^{1}, ECO-cars^{2}, futbolsport.pl^{2}, Renault^{3}
Widzew Łódź	(Poland) Mateusz Dróżdż	(Poland) Janusz Niedźwiedź	1 July 2021	(Poland) Patryk Stępiński	Kappa	DiMedical, TERMOton	Murapol^{1}, PKP Cargo^{2}, STS^{2}, CoBouw^{3}, Łódzkie^{3}
Wisła Płock	(Poland) Tomasz Marzec	(Poland) Marek Saganowski	16 May 2023	(Poland) Jakub Rzeźniczak	Adidas	PKN Orlen	Budmat^{1}, Płock^{2} ^{3}, POKiS^{2} ^{3}
Zagłębie Lubin	(Poland) Michał Kielan	(Poland) Waldemar Fornalik	29 November 2022	(Poland) Bartosz Kopacz	Nike	KGHM	STS^{2}

1. On the back of shirt.
2. On the sleeves.
3. On the shorts.

=== Managerial changes ===
Team	Outgoing manager	Manner of departure	Date of vacancy	Position in table	Incoming manager	Date of appointment
Pogoń Szczecin	(Germany) Kosta Runjaić	End of contract	30 June 2022	Pre-season	(Sweden) Jens Gustafsson	15 June 2022
Legia Warsaw	(Serbia) Aleksandar Vuković	End of contract	30 June 2022	Pre-season	(Germany) Kosta Runjaić	23 June 2022
Śląsk Wrocław	(Poland) Piotr Tworek	Sacked	25 May 2022	Pre-season	(Serbia) Ivan Đurđević	2 June 2022
Lech Poznań	(Poland) Maciej Skorża	Resigned	6 June 2022	Pre-season	(Netherlands) John van den Brom	20 June 2022
Jagiellonia Białystok	(Poland) Piotr Nowak	Sacked	10 June 2022	Pre-season	(Poland) Maciej Stolarczyk	14 June 2022
Górnik Zabrze	(Poland) Jan Urban	Sacked	14 June 2022	Pre-season	(Germany) Bartosch Gaul	23 June 2022
Lechia Gdańsk	(Poland) Tomasz Kaczmarek	Sacked	1 September 2022	18th	(Poland) Marcin Kaczmarek	1 September 2022
Miedź Legnica	(Poland) Wojciech Łobodziński	Sacked	11 October 2022	18th	(Poland) Radosław Bella	11 October 2022
Miedź Legnica	(Poland) Radosław Bella	End of caretaker spell	17 October 2022	18th	(Poland) Grzegorz Mokry	17 October 2022
Piast Gliwice	(Poland) Waldemar Fornalik	Mutual consent	25 October 2022	15th	(Serbia) Aleksandar Vuković	27 October 2022
Korona Kielce	(Poland) Leszek Ojrzyński	Sacked	29 October 2022	16th	(Poland) Kamil Kuzera (Note: Kuzera was initially appointed as interim coach, but the move was made permanent on 23 November 2022.)	29 October 2022
Zagłębie Lubin	(Poland) Piotr Stokowiec	Sacked	8 November 2022	14th	(Poland) Paweł Karmelita	8 November 2022
Zagłębie Lubin	(Poland) Paweł Karmelita	End of caretaker spell	29 November 2022	15th	(Poland) Waldemar Fornalik	29 November 2022
Górnik Zabrze	(Germany) Bartosch Gaul	Sacked	18 March 2023	14th	(Poland) Jan Urban	18 March 2023
Stal Mielec	(Poland) Adam Majewski	Sacked	20 March 2023	11th	(Poland) Kamil Kiereś	20 March 2023
Lechia Gdańsk	(Poland) Marcin Kaczmarek	Sacked	21 March 2023	17th	(Spain) David Badía	21 March 2023
Jagiellonia Białystok	(Poland) Maciej Stolarczyk	Sacked	4 April 2023	14th	(Poland) Adrian Siemieniec	4 April 2023
Radomiak Radom	(Poland) Mariusz Lewandowski	Sacked	16 April 2023	11th	(Romania) Constantin Gâlcă	16 April 2023
Śląsk Wrocław	(Serbia) Ivan Đurđević	Sacked	21 April 2023	16th	(Poland) Jacek Magiera	21 April 2023
Wisła Płock	(Slovakia) Pavol Staňo	Sacked	16 May 2023	15th	(Poland) Marek Saganowski	16 May 2023

- Italics for interim managers.

== League table ==
Pos	Team	Pld	W	D	L	GF	GA	GD	Pts	Qualification or relegation
1	Raków Częstochowa (C)	34	23	6	5	63	24	+39	75	Qualification for the Champions League first qualifying round
2	Legia Warsaw	34	19	9	6	57	37	+20	66	Qualification for the Europa Conference League second qualifying round (Note: Since the winner of the 2022–23 Polish Cup qualified for the Europa Conference League based on league position, the third Europa Conference League second qualifying round berth was transferred to the 4th-placed team.)
3	Lech Poznań	34	17	10	7	51	29	+22	61	Qualification for the Europa Conference League second qualifying round
4	Pogoń Szczecin	34	17	9	8	57	46	+11	60	Qualification for the Europa Conference League second qualifying round
5	Piast Gliwice	34	15	8	11	40	31	+9	53	
6	Górnik Zabrze	34	13	9	12	45	43	+2	48	
7	Cracovia	34	12	10	12	41	35	+6	46	
8	Warta Poznań	34	12	9	13	37	35	+2	45	
9	Zagłębie Lubin	34	12	9	13	35	44	−9	45	
10	Radomiak Radom	34	12	8	14	34	41	−7	44	
11	Stal Mielec	34	11	10	13	36	40	−4	43	
12	Widzew Łódź	34	11	8	15	38	47	−9	41	
13	Korona Kielce	34	11	8	15	39	48	−9	41	
14	Jagiellonia Białystok	34	9	14	11	48	49	−1	41	
15	Śląsk Wrocław	34	9	11	14	35	48	−13	38	
16	Wisła Płock (R)	34	10	7	17	41	50	−9	37	Relegation to I liga
17	Lechia Gdańsk (R)	34	8	6	20	28	56	−28	30	Relegation to I liga
18	Miedź Legnica (R)	34	4	11	19	33	55	−22	23	Relegation to I liga

Source: ekstraklasa.org
Rules for classification: 1) Points; 2) Head-to-head points; 3) Head-to-head goal difference; 4) Goal difference; 5) Goals scored; 6) Number of wins; 7) Number of away wins; 8) Lower number of points based on yellow and red cards (red card = 3 points, yellow card = 1 point, sending-off = 3 points - including 1 point for first yellow card); 9) Fairplay ranking; 10) Draw. (Note: Head-to-head record is used only after all the matches between the teams in question have been played)
(C) Champions; (R) Relegated

== Results ==
Home \ Away	CRA	GÓR	JAG	KOR	LPO	LGD	LEG	MLE	PIA	POG	RAD	RAK	STA	ŚLĄ	WAR	WID	WPŁ	ZAG
Cracovia	—	2–0	1–0	2–0	0–0	0–1	3–0	1–1	0–1	1–1	3–0	3–0	2–1	1–1	0–2	1–1	3–0	0–1
Górnik Zabrze	0–2	—	1–1	1–1	1–2	1–1	0–1	0–3	3–3	2–1	0–0	1–0	1–3	2–0	2–0	3–0	3–2	2–3
Jagiellonia Białystok	1–1	2–1	—	4–1	1–2	1–0	2–5	2–1	2–0	2–0	1–2	1–2	4–0	1–1	3–1	0–2	1–1	2–2
Korona Kielce	2–1	1–2	2–1	—	0–3	1–0	1–1	1–0	1–1	1–2	2–1	1–0	0–2	3–1	0–1	0–1	1–0	2–2
Lech Poznań	3–0	0–1	2–0	3–2	—	5–0	0–0	1–0	1–0	2–2	1–0	1–2	0–2	0–1	2–0	2–0	1–3	1–2
Lechia Gdańsk	1–2	2–1	2–2	0–1	0–3	—	1–0	4–0	1–3	0–1	1–3	0–3	1–0	0–0	0–0	0–0	1–0	1–3
Legia Warsaw	2–2	2–2	5–1	3–2	2–2	2–1	—	3–2	2–0	1–1	1–0	3–1	2–0	3–1	1–0	2–2	2–0	2–0
Miedź Legnica	1–1	0–0	1–1	2–2	2–2	2–1	2–2	—	0–1	2–4	0–0	0–2	0–2	1–0	1–2	0–1	2–1	0–1
Piast Gliwice	2–1	1–0	1–1	2–1	1–1	3–0 (Note: Match stopped at 0-1 in the second half due to Lechia supporters throwing pyrotechnics on the pitch. Shortly after Piast was awarded a 3-0 forfeit win and on 31 May 2023 Lechia was penalised for that by the League Committee with a fine of 100,000 zł as well as 7-month with no supporters on away matches. Lechia was also penalized with a fine of 500,000 zł for not fulfilling a minimal amount of 3000 minutes for their young players.)	0–1	2–1	—	0–0	1–2	0–1	4–0	1–1	0–2	1–2	1–0	0–1
Pogoń Szczecin	3–2	1–4	1–0	0–0	2–2	2–1	2–1	3–2	1–1	—	4–0	0–2	4–2	0–2	3–1	2–1	2–2	3–0
Radomiak Radom	0–2	0–3	0–0	0–2	1–1	4–1	0–2	1–1	0–1	1–2	—	0–0	1–0	2–0	2–3	3–1	2–0	0–1
Raków Częstochowa	4–1	2–0	2–2	1–0	0–2	4–0	4–0	1–0	1–0	1–0	3–0	—	3–2	4–1	1–0	2–0	7–1	1–1
Stal Mielec	2–0	0–1	1–1	2–1	0–0	0–0	0–1	1–1	0–2	4–2	1–1	0–0	—	2–0	1–0	0–3	1–1	3–0
Śląsk Wrocław	1–1	4–1	2–2	1–1	2–1	2–1	0–0	4–2	0–1	2–1	0–1	1–4	1–1	—	0–2	0–0	3–1	0–3
Warta Poznań	0–0	0–0	2–0	5–1	0–1	2–0	1–0	1–1	1–1	1–2	1–2	1–1	1–1	3–1	—	0–1	0–4	2–2
Widzew Łódź	2–0	2–3	1–1	0–3	1–2	2–3	1–2	1–0	2–3	3–3	1–3	0–0	0–2	1–0	0–2	—	2–1	3–0
Wisła Płock	1–0	1–1	2–4	2–1	0–1	3–0	2–1	4–1	1–0	0–1	1–1	1–2	0–0	1–2	1–0	1–1	—	2–0
Zagłębie Lubin	0–2	0–2	1–1	1–1	1–1	0–3	1–2	2–1	0–2	0–1	0–1	1–2	2–0	0–0	0–0	2–0	2–1	—

Source: ekstraklasa.org
Legend: Blue = home team win; Yellow = draw; Red = away team win.
For upcoming matches, an "a" indicates there is an article about the rivalry between the two participants.

== Results by round ==
Team ╲ Round	1	2	3	4	5	6	7	8	9	10	11	12	13	14	15	16	17	18	19	20	21	22	23	24	25	26	27	28	29	30	31	32	33	34
Cracovia	W	W	W	L	L	D	L	W	L	D	W	L	D	D	W	W	L	W	L	D	W	L	D	D	L	D	L	W	W	D	L	L	D	W
Górnik Zabrze	L	W	W	L	D	D	D	D	W	L	L	L	D	W	W	L	L	L	D	D	L	W	L	L	W	L	D	W	W	W	W	W	W	D
Jagiellonia Białystok	W	L	L	L	D	W	D	D	W	D	W	D	L	D	L	L	L	D	D	W	D	L	D	W	D	D	W	L	W	W	D	L	D	L
Korona Kielce	D	L	W	W	L	L	W	L	D	L	L	D	L	L	D	L	L	L	W	D	W	L	W	W	D	W	D	W	D	L	W	L	L	W
Lech Poznań	L	L	D	L	W	W	W	D	W	D	W	W	D	L	W	W	D	D	W	W	L	L	W	D	W	D	W	D	D	L	W	W	W	W
Lechia Gdańsk	L	W	L	L	L	L	D	D	D	L	W	L	W	W	L	L	W	W	D	D	L	L	L	W	L	D	L	L	L	L	L	D	W	
Legia Warsaw	D	W	L	W	W	D	W	W	L	W	D	W	L	D	W	W	D	W	W	D	W	D	W	W	W	W	D	D	L	W	L	W	L	W
Miedź Legnica	D	L	L	L	L	W	L	D	L	L	L	D	L	L	W	W	D	D	L	D	W	L	D	L	L	L	D	D	L	D	L	L	L	D
Piast Gliwice	L	L	L	W	W	L	W	D	D	L	L	L	D	L	D	L	W	D	L	W	L	W	W	D	W	W	W	W	W	D	W	W	D	
Pogoń Szczecin	W	L	W	W	D	W	L	W	W	D	W	L	D	D	W	L	W	D	L	L	W	W	L	W	D	D	W	W	W	D	W	W	L	W
Radomiak Radom	D	D	L	W	W	W	L	L	W	L	L	L	W	W	L	W	L	D	W	D	D	W	L	L	L	D	D	L	D	W	L	W	W	L
Raków Częstochowa	W	W	L	D	W	W	L	W	W	D	W	W	W	W	W	W	W	D	W	D	W	W	W	W	W	L	D	W	W	W	L	L	W	D
Stal Mielec	W	D	L	W	W	L	L	W	W	L	W	W	W	D	L	W	D	D	L	D	L	L	L	L	D	D	W	D	L	W	D	D	L	W
Śląsk Wrocław	D	W	L	D	W	D	L	L	W	D	L	W	L	D	W	L	D	L	W	D	L	W	D	L	D	D	L	L	L	L	D	W	W	L
Warta Poznań	L	L	W	L	W	L	W	D	D	L	W	W	W	D	W	W	D	D	D	L	W	W	L	D	W	D	L	W	W	L	L	L	D	L
Widzew Łódź	L	W	L	D	L	W	W	L	W	W	D	W	W	W	L	L	W	D	D	D	W	D	L	D	L	D	L	L	L	L	W	L	L	L
Wisła Płock	W	W	W	W	D	W	L	D	L	L	W	D	W	D	L	L	W	L	L	L	L	L	W	D	L	D	W	L	L	L	D	L	L	L
Zagłębie Lubin	D	L	W	D	W	L	L	D	D	W	W	D	L	L	L	L	L	W	L	L	W	W	W	L	D	D	L	L	D	W	W	W	W	D

Source: 90minut.pl
W = Win; D = Draw; L = Loss

== Positions by round ==
Note: The list does not include the matches postponed to a later date but includes all games played in advance. (Note: The list of postponed matches: Miedź Legnica – Lech Poznań (2nd round, played on 1 February 2023); Piast Gliwice – Raków Częstochowa (2nd round, played on 6 October 2022); Lechia Gdańsk – Górnik Zabrze (2nd round, played on 18 November 2022); Raków Częstochowa – Pogoń Szczecin (6th round, played on 31 August 2022); Lechia Gdańsk – Lech Poznań (6th round, played on 31 August 2022); Wisła Płock – Warta Poznań (19th round, played on 8 March 2023))

Team ╲ Round	1	2	3	4	5	6	7	8	9	10	11	12	13	14	15	16	17	18	19	20	21	22	23	24	25	26	27	28	29	30	31	32	33	34
Cracovia	3	2	2	2	5	4	6	4	6	6	5	9	8	9	7	6	8	6	6	7	6	6	6	6	7	7	9	8	7	7	7	8	10	7
Górnik Zabrze	15	14	10	7	11	10	12	12	14	10	13	14	14	14	13	11	12	12	13	14	15	13	15	16	15	16	16	14	11	9	8	6	6	6
Jagiellonia Białystok	2	9	12	13	14	12	13	14	9	9	7	8	9	10	12	13	13	15	14	12	12	14	14	13	14	14	12	13	9	8	10	12	12	14
Korona Kielce	7	12	6	5	10	13	8	9	12	15	16	15	16	16	17	17	17	18	17	17	17	17	16	15	16	15	13	11	14	14	13	14	14	13
Lech Poznań	17	16	18	17	18	17	15	8	11	7	10	7	7	7	8	8	6	5	3	3	3	4	3	3	3	3	3	3	4	4	4	4	3	3
Lechia Gdańsk	18	17	13	14	16	16	18	18	18	18	18	17	17	17	15	15	14	13	12	13	14	16	17	17	17	17	17	17	17	17	17	17	17	17
Legia Warsaw	8	3	8	6	4	2	2	2	3	1	2	2	3	4	2	2	2	2	2	2	2	2	2	2	2	2	2	2	2	2	2	2	2	2
Miedź Legnica	9	11	16	16	17	18	17	17	17	17	17	18	18	18	18	18	18	17	18	18	18	18	18	18	18	18	18	18	18	18	18	18	18	18
Piast Gliwice	16	15	17	18	15	14	16	13	15	14	15	16	15	15	16	16	16	16	16	15	16	15	13	14	10	8	8	6	6	6	5	5	5	5
Pogoń Szczecin	5	8	4	3	3	5	4	3	2	3	1	4	5	5	3	4	4	3	5	5	5	5	4	4	4	4	4	4	3	3	3	3	4	4
Radomiak Radom	10	10	15	11	6	3	5	7	5	8	12	13	11	8	10	10	10	10	9	9	7	7	8	8	9	10	10	12	13	12	12	10	8	10
Raków Częstochowa	6	7	3	8	9	9	3	6	4	2	4	1	1	1	1	1	1	1	1	1	1	1	1	1	1	1	1	1	1	1	1	1	1	1
Stal Mielec	4	4	5	4	2	6	9	5	8	13	9	6	6	6	6	5	7	8	8	6	8	9	9	10	11	11	11	10	12	10	11	13	13	11
Śląsk Wrocław	11	5	7	9	7	7	10	16	10	12	14	11	13	12	11	12	11	11	11	11	11	11	10	11	12	12	14	16	16	16	16	16	15	15
Warta Poznań	14	18	13	15	12	15	11	11	13	16	11	12	10	11	9	9	9	9	10	10	10	8	7	7	5	5	5	5	5	5	6	7	7	8
Widzew Łódź	13	6	11	12	13	11	7	10	7	5	6	5	4	2	4	3	3	4	4	4	4	3	5	5	6	6	6	7	8	11	9	9	11	12
Wisła Płock	1	1	1	1	1	1	1	1	1	4	3	3	2	3	5	7	5	7	7	8	9	10	12	9	8	9	9	9	10	13	15	15	16	16
Zagłębie Lubin	12	13	9	10	8	8	14	15	16	11	8	10	12	13	14	14	15	14	15	16	13	12	11	12	13	13	15	15	15	15	14	11	9	9

Qualification for the Champions League first qualifying round
Qualification for the Europa Conference League second qualifying round
Relegation to I liga

Source: ekstraklasa.org

== Season statistics ==
=== Top goalscorers ===
Rank	Player	Club	Goals
1	(Spain) Marc Gual	Jagiellonia Białystok	16
2	(Spain) Jesús Imaz	Jagiellonia Białystok	14
3	(Poland) Kamil Grosicki	Pogoń Szczecin	13
4	(Portugal) Josué	Legia Warsaw	12
4	(Poland) Jakub Łukowski	Korona Kielce	12
6	(Sweden) Mikael Ishak	Lech Poznań	11
7	(Poland) Bartosz Nowak	Raków Częstochowa	10
7	(Poland) Bartłomiej Pawłowski	Widzew Łódź	10
7	(Germany) John Yeboah	Śląsk Wrocław	10
10	(Spain) Davo	Wisła Płock	9
10	(Bosnia and Herzegovina) Said Hamulić	Stal Mielec	9
10	(Spain) Ivi	Raków Częstochowa	9
10	(Poland) Michał Skóraś	Lech Poznań	9
10	(Poland) Kamil Wilczek	Piast Gliwice	9
10	(Poland) Szymon Włodarczyk	Górnik Zabrze	9
10	(Poland) Łukasz Zwoliński	Lechia Gdańsk	9

=== Hat-tricks ===
Player	For	Against	Result	Date	Ref
(Poland) Kamil Wilczek	Piast Gliwice	Stal Mielec	4–0 (H)	21 August 2022	
(Poland) Sebastian Kowalczyk	Pogoń Szczecin	Miedź Legnica	2–4 (A)	28 October 2022	
(Portugal) Josué	Legia Warsaw	Jagiellonia Białystok	2–5 (A)	29 October 2022	
(Latvia) Vladislavs Gutkovskis^{(4)}	Raków Częstochowa	Wisła Płock	7–1 (H)	5 November 2022	
(Spain) Marc Gual	Jagiellonia Białystok	Wisła Płock	2–4 (A)	21 April 2023	

- ^{(4)} – player scored four goals.

== Awards ==
=== Monthly awards ===
==== Player of the Month ====
Month	Player	Club
July 2022	(Poland) Rafał Wolski	Wisła Płock
August 2022	(Poland) Bartosz Nowak	Raków Częstochowa
September 2022	(Spain) Jesús Imaz	Jagiellonia Białystok
October 2022	(Netherlands) Said Hamulić	Stal Mielec
November 2022	(Latvia) Vladislavs Gutkovskis	Raków Częstochowa
February 2023	(Germany) John Yeboah	Śląsk Wrocław
March 2023	(Spain) Ivi	Raków Częstochowa
April 2023	(Spain) Marc Gual	Jagiellonia Białystok
May 2023	(Norway) Kristoffer Velde	Lech Poznań

==== Young Player of the Month ====
Month	Player	Club
July 2022	(Poland) Michał Rakoczy	Cracovia
August 2022	(Poland) Aleksander Paluszek	Górnik Zabrze
September 2022	(Poland) Olaf Kobacki	Miedź Legnica
October 2022	(Poland) Szymon Włodarczyk	Górnik Zabrze
November 2022	(Poland) Filip Szymczak	Lech Poznań
February 2023	(Poland) Gabriel Kobylak	Radomiak Radom
March 2023	(Poland) Filip Marchwiński	Lech Poznań
April 2023	(Poland) Ariel Mosór	Piast Gliwice
May 2023	(Poland) Maciej Rosołek	Legia Warsaw

==== Coach of the Month ====
Month	Coach	Club
July 2022	(Slovakia) Pavol Staňo	Wisła Płock
August 2022	(Germany) Kosta Runjaić	Legia Warsaw
September 2022	(Netherlands) John van den Brom	Lech Poznań
October 2022	(Poland) Marek Papszun	Raków Częstochowa
November 2022	(Poland) Marek Papszun	Raków Częstochowa
February 2023	(Poland) Marek Papszun	Raków Częstochowa
March 2023	(Poland) Marek Papszun	Raków Częstochowa
April 2023	(Serbia) Aleksandar Vuković	Piast Gliwice
May 2023	(Poland) Jan Urban	Górnik Zabrze

=== Annual awards ===
Award	Player	Club
Player of the Season	(Poland) Kamil Grosicki	Pogoń Szczecin
Young Player of the Season	(Poland) Ariel Mosór	Piast Gliwice
Goalkeeper of the Season	(Bosnia and Herzegovina) Vladan Kovačević	Raków Częstochowa
Defender of the Season	(Croatia) Fran Tudor	Raków Częstochowa
Midfielder of the Season	(Portugal) Josué	Legia Warsaw
Forward of the Season	(Spain) Marc Gual	Jagiellonia Białystok
Coach of the Season	(Poland) Marek Papszun	Raków Częstochowa
Goal of the Season	(Poland) Fabian Piasecki	Raków Częstochowa

== Attendances ==
No.	Club	Average	Highest
1	Legia Warszawa	21,230	28,034
2	Lech Poznań	20,736	39,123
3	Widzew Łódź	17,093	17,829
4	Pogoń Szczecin	15,397	20,257
5	Górnik Zabrze	14,618	21,474
6	Śląsk Wrocław	10,365	21,947
7	Korona Kielce	10,065	14,515
8	Jagiellonia Białystok	9,058	16,635
9	Cracovia	8,437	13,128
10	Lechia Gdańsk	7,437	15,832
11	Zagłębie Lubin	5,812	11,039
12	Raków Częstochowa	5,249	5,500
13	Stal Mielec	5,052	6,543
14	Miedź Legnica	4,423	5,575
15	Piast Gliwice	4,170	6,888
16	Wisła Płock	3,923	4,300
17	Radomiak Radom	3,407	4,444
18	Warta Poznań	2,782	18,755

== See also ==
- 2022–23 I liga
- 2022–23 II liga
- 2022–23 III liga
- 2022–23 Polish Cup
- 2022 Polish Super Cup
