= 2020–21 Ekstraklasa =

95th season of top-tier football league in Poland

Ekstraklasa
- Season: 2020–21
- Dates: 21 August 2020 – 16 May 2021
- Champions: Legia Warsaw (15th title)
- Relegated: Podbeskidzie Bielsko-Biała
- Champions League: Legia Warsaw
- Europa Conference League: Raków Częstochowa; Pogoń Szczecin; Śląsk Wrocław
- Matches: 240
- Goals: 589 (2.45 per match)
- Top goalscorer: Tomáš Pekhart (22 goals)
- Biggest home win: Lechia 4–0 Podbeskidzie (26 September 2020); Lech 4–0 Podbeskidzie (6 December 2020); Wisła P. 4–0 Zagłębie (16 May 2021)
- Biggest away win: Stal 0–6 Wisła K. (18 October 2020)
- Highest scoring: Jagiellonia 5–2 Wisła P. (23 November 2020); Jagiellonia 4–3 Warta (5 December 2020); Wisła K. 3–4 Piast (31 January 2021); Legia 5–2 Wisła P. (20 February 2021); Śląsk 4–3 Podbeskidzie (20 April 2021)
- Longest winning run: 6 matches Pogoń Szczecin; Legia Warsaw
- Longest unbeaten run: 15 matches Legia Warsaw
- Longest winless run: 10 matches Wisła Płock
- Longest losing run: 4 matches Piast Gliwice; Podbeskidzie Bielsko-Biała; Stal Mielec; Lechia Gdańsk; Warta Poznań; Wisła Kraków
- Highest attendance: 17,546 (Note: Due to the COVID-19 pandemic, the match have been played with a limited number of spectators at maximum of 50% of stadium capacity.); Lech 1–0 Warta (20 September 2020)
- Lowest attendance: 0 (Note: Matches have been played behind closed doors without any spectators.); All matches between 17 October 2020 and 15 May 2021 due to the COVID-19 pandemic.
- Total attendance: 248,549 (Note: Season total attendance after 51 matches (until 17 October 2020 and on 16 May 2021). All matches have been played with a limited number of spectators.)
- Average attendance: 4,874 (Note: Season total attendance after 51 matches (until 17 October 2020 and on 16 May 2021). All matches have been played with a limited number of spectators.) ▼28,4%

The 2020–21 Ekstraklasa (also known as PKO Bank Polski Ekstraklasa due to its sponsorship by PKO Bank Polski) was the 95th season of the Polish Football Championship, the 87th season of the highest tier domestic division in the Polish football league system since its establishment in 1927 and the 13th season of the Ekstraklasa under its current title. The league was operated by the Ekstraklasa SA.

The regular season was played as a round-robin tournament. A total of 16 teams participated, 13 of which competed in the league during the previous season, while the remaining three were promoted from the 2019–20 I liga. On 24 July 2020 Ekstraklasa SA and Polish Football Association announced the 2020–21 season calendar. The season started on 21 August 2020 and concluded on 16 May 2021. Due to the season start being delayed due to the COVID-19 pandemic it was shortened to 30 matchdays without a split into Championship and Relegation groups. Each team played a total of 30 matches, half at home and half away. After the 14th matchday the league went on a winter break between 21 December 2020 and 28 January 2021. 2020–21 was a transition season (only the team which took 16th position after the season was relegated to I liga) to extend Ekstraklasa from 16 to 18 teams starting with the 2021–22 season. During 2020–21 season a substitution limit increased from three to five. It was the fourth Ekstraklasa season to use VAR. Due to the COVID-19 pandemic, only 51 matches were played with a limited number of spectators. The rest of the matches (between 17 October 2020 and 15 May 2021) were played behind closed doors without any spectators.

The two clubs promoted from I liga were Podbeskidzie Bielsko-Biała, returning to Ekstraklasa after four years, as well as Stal Mielec, who made a return to Ekstraklasa after 24 years. After winning the I liga promotion play-offs, Warta Poznań also returned to Ekstraklasa after 25 years.

Legia Warsaw were the defending champions, and won their 15th title overall on 28 April after Raków Częstochowa drew 0–0 away to Jagiellonia Białystok with three games remaining. The season's runner-up was Raków Częstochowa, and the third-placed team was Pogoń Szczecin. The only relegated team this season was Podbeskidzie Bielsko-Biała.

== Teams ==
A total of 16 teams participate in the 2020–21 Ekstraklasa season.

=== Changes from last season ===
Promoted from 2019–20 I liga	Relegated from 2019–20 Ekstraklasa
▲ Stal Mielec (1st) ▲ Podbeskidzie Bielsko-Biała (2nd) ▲ Warta Poznań (PO)	▼ Arka Gdynia (14th) ▼ Korona Kielce (15th) ▼ ŁKS Łódź (16th)

=== Stadiums and locations ===
Note: Table lists in alphabetical order.

Team	Location	Venue	Capacity
Cracovia	Kraków	Stadion im. Józefa Piłsudskiego	15,114
Górnik Zabrze	Zabrze	Stadion im. Ernesta Pohla	24,563^{1}
Jagiellonia Białystok	Białystok	Stadion Jagiellonii Białystok	22,432
Lech Poznań	Poznań	Stadion Poznań	43,269
Lechia Gdańsk	Gdańsk	Stadion Gdańsk	43,615
Legia Warsaw	Warsaw	Stadion Wojska Polskiego	31,800
Piast Gliwice	Gliwice	Stadion im. Piotra Wieczorka	10,037
Podbeskidzie Bielsko-Biała	Bielsko-Biała	Stadion Podbeskidzia Bielsko-Biała	15,076
Pogoń Szczecin	Szczecin	Stadion im. Floriana Krygiera	4,200^{2}
Raków Częstochowa	Bełchatów	GIEKSA Arena^{3}	5,264
Raków Częstochowa	Częstochowa	Miejski Stadion Piłkarski Raków^{4}	4,200
Stal Mielec	Mielec	Stadion Stali Mielec	6,864
Śląsk Wrocław	Wrocław	Stadion Wrocław	45,105
Warta Poznań	Poznań	Stadion Dyskobolii Grodzisk Wielkopolski^{5}	5,383
Wisła Kraków	Kraków	Stadion im. Henryka Reymana	33,326
Wisła Płock	Płock	Stadion im. Kazimierza Górskiego	12,800
Zagłębie Lubin	Lubin	Stadion Zagłębia Lubin	16,068

1. Upgrading to 31,871.
2. Upgrading to 21,163.
3. Due to the renovation of the Municipal Football Stadium "Raków" in Częstochowa, Raków played their home matches at the GIEKSA Arena in Bełchatów.
4. Stadium used for two games behind closed doors – against Śląsk Wrocław (26th round) and Piast Gliwice (29th round)
5. Due to the renovation of Warta Poznań Stadium in Poznań, Warta played their home matches at the Stadion Dyskobolii in Grodzisk Wielkopolski.

Cracovia	Górnik Zabrze	Jagiellonia	Lech	Lechia	Legia
Stadion im. Józefa Piłsudskiego	Stadion im. Ernesta Pohla	Stadion Jagiellonii Białystok	Stadion Poznań	Arena Gdańsk	Stadion Wojska Polskiego
Capacity: 15,114	Capacity: 24,563	Capacity: 22,432	Capacity: 43,269	Capacity: 43,615	Capacity: 31,800
Piast	Location of teams in 2020–21 Ekstraklasa				Podbeskidzie
Stadion im. Piotra Wieczorka	Location of teams in 2020–21 Ekstraklasa				Stadion Podbeskidzia Bielsko-Biała
Capacity: 10,037	Location of teams in 2020–21 Ekstraklasa				Capacity: 15,076
Pogoń	Location of teams in 2020–21 Ekstraklasa				Raków
Stadion im. Floriana Krygiera	Location of teams in 2020–21 Ekstraklasa				GIEKSA Arena
Capacity: 4,200	Location of teams in 2020–21 Ekstraklasa				Capacity: 5,264
Stal Mielec	Śląsk	Warta	Wisła Kraków	Wisła Płock	Zagłębie
Stadion Stali Mielec	Stadion Wrocław	Stadion Dyskobolii Grodzisk Wielkopolski	Stadion im. Henryka Reymana	Stadion im. Kazimierza Górskiego	Stadion Zagłębia Lubin
Capacity: 6,864	Capacity: 45,105	Capacity: 5,383	Capacity: 33,326	Capacity: 12,800	Capacity: 16,068

Location of teams in the Katowice urban area

=== Personnel and kits ===
Team	Chairman	Head coach	Appointment Date	Captain	Manufacturer	Strategic sponsor
Cracovia	(Poland) Janusz Filipiak	(Poland) Michał Probierz	20 June 2017	(Romania) Sergiu Hanca	Puma	Comarch
Górnik Zabrze	(Poland) Bartosz Sarnowski	(Poland) Marcin Brosz	3 June 2016	(Poland) Michał Koj	Hummel	Węglokoks
Jagiellonia Białystok	(Poland) Cezary Kulesza	(Poland) Rafał Grzyb (ad int.)	17 March 2021	(Poland) Taras Romanczuk	Kappa	STS
Lech Poznań	(Poland) Karol Klimczak (Poland) Piotr Rutkowski	(Poland) Maciej Skorża	12 April 2021	(Norway) Thomas Rogne	Macron	STS
Lechia Gdańsk	(Poland) Adam Mandziara	(Poland) Piotr Stokowiec	5 March 2018	(Portugal) Flávio Paixão	New Balance	Energa, Paytren
Legia Warsaw	(Poland) Dariusz Mioduski	(Poland) Czesław Michniewicz	21 September 2020	(Poland) Artur Jędrzejczyk	Adidas	Plus500
Piast Gliwice	(Poland) Grzegorz Bednarski	(Poland) Waldemar Fornalik	19 September 2017	(Spain) Gerard Badía	Adidas	Betclic, Kar-Tel
Podbeskidzie Bielsko-Biała	(Poland) Bogdan Kłys	(Poland) Robert Kasperczyk	22 December 2020	(Poland) Łukasz Sierpina	Masita	Łukosz, Bielsko-Biała
Pogoń Szczecin	(Poland) Jarosław Mroczek	(Germany) Kosta Runjaić	6 November 2017	(Poland) Adam Frączczak	Capelli Sport	
Raków Częstochowa	(Poland) Wojciech Cygan	(Poland) Marek Papszun	18 April 2016	(Czech Republic) Tomáš Petrášek	Macron	x-kom
Stal Mielec	(Poland) Bartłomiej Jaskot	(Poland) Włodzimierz Gąsior	12 April 2021	(Poland) Krystian Getinger	Adidas	PGE
Śląsk Wrocław	(Poland) Piotr Waśniewski	(Poland) Jacek Magiera	22 March 2021	(Poland) Krzysztof Mączyński	Adidas	Noblebet
Warta Poznań	(Poland) Michał Wieczorek	(Poland) Piotr Tworek	1 July 2019	(Poland) Bartosz Kieliba	Nike	Totalbet
Wisła Kraków	(Poland) Dawid Błaszczykowski	(Poland) Kazimierz Kmiecik (ad int.)	14 May 2021	(Poland) Jakub Błaszczykowski	Macron	LV BET, Socios Wisła
Wisła Płock	(Poland) Jacek Kruszewski	(Poland) Maciej Bartoszek	13 April 2021	(Poland) Alan Uryga	Adidas	PKN Orlen
Zagłębie Lubin	(Poland) Marcin Lewiński	(Slovakia) Martin Ševela	16 September 2019	(Montenegro) Saša Balić	Nike	KGHM

=== Managerial changes ===
Team	Outgoing manager	Manner of departure	Date of vacancy	Position in table	Incoming manager	Date of appointment
Jagiellonia Białystok	(Bulgaria) Ivaylo Petev	Mutual consent	31 July 2020	Pre-season	(Poland) Bogdan Zając	31 July 2020
Stal Mielec	(Poland) Dariusz Marzec	Mutual consent	31 July 2020	Pre-season	(Poland) Dariusz Skrzypczak	31 July 2020
Legia Warsaw	(Serbia) Aleksandar Vuković	Sacked	21 September 2020	7th	(Poland) Czesław Michniewicz	21 September 2020
Stal Mielec	(Poland) Dariusz Skrzypczak	Sacked	10 November 2020	15th	(Poland) Leszek Ojrzyński	11 November 2020
Wisła Kraków	(Poland) Artur Skowronek	Sacked	28 November 2020	12th	(Germany) Peter Hyballa (Poland) Kazimierz Kmiecik (Poland) Grzegorz Mokry	2 December 2020; 30 November 2020; 30 November 2020
Podbeskidzie Bielsko-Biała	(Poland) Krzysztof Brede	Sacked	15 December 2020	16th	(Poland) Robert Kasperczyk	22 December 2020
Jagiellonia Białystok	(Poland) Bogdan Zając	Sacked	17 March 2021	12th	(Poland) Rafał Grzyb	17 March 2021
Śląsk Wrocław	(Czech Republic) Vítězslav Lavička	Sacked	21 March 2021	7th	(Poland) Jacek Magiera	22 March 2021
Lech Poznań	(Poland) Dariusz Żuraw	Sacked	6 April 2021	9th	(Poland) Maciej Skorża (Poland) Janusz Góra (Note: He was the interim coach during the Lech's game against Legia Warsaw, on 11 April 2021.)	12 April 2021; 11 April 2021
Stal Mielec	(Poland) Leszek Ojrzyński	Sacked	12 April 2021	16th	(Poland) Włodzimierz Gąsior	12 April 2021
Wisła Płock	(Poland) Radosław Sobolewski	Sacked	12 April 2021	13th	(Poland) Maciej Bartoszek	13 April 2021
Wisła Kraków	(Germany) Peter Hyballa	Mutual consent	14 May 2021	14th	(Poland) Kazimierz Kmiecik	14 May 2021

- Italics for interim managers.

== League table ==
Pos	Team	Pld	W	D	L	GF	GA	GD	Pts	Qualification or relegation
1	Legia Warsaw (C)	30	19	7	4	48	24	+24	64	Qualification for the Champions League first qualifying round
2	Raków Częstochowa	30	17	8	5	46	25	+21	59	Qualification for the Europa Conference League second qualifying round (Note: Raków Częstochowa qualified for the Europa Conference League by winning the 2020–21 Polish Cup and also by finishing second in the Ekstraklasa. As a result, the berth reserved for third place was passed to the fourth-placed team from the 2020–21 Ekstraklasa.)
3	Pogoń Szczecin	30	15	7	8	36	23	+13	52	Qualification for the Europa Conference League second qualifying round
4	Śląsk Wrocław	30	11	10	9	36	32	+4	43 (Note: Head-to-head points: Śląsk Wrocław 6, Warta Poznań 0.)	Qualification for the Europa Conference League first qualifying round
5	Warta Poznań	30	13	4	13	33	32	+1	43	
6	Piast Gliwice	30	11	9	10	39	32	+7	42 (Note: Head-to-head points: Piast Gliwice 4, Lechia Gdańsk 1.)	
7	Lechia Gdańsk	30	12	6	12	40	37	+3	42	
8	Zagłębie Lubin	30	11	8	11	38	40	−2	41	
9	Jagiellonia Białystok	30	10	7	13	39	48	−9	37 (Note: Head-to-head points: Jagiellonia Białystok 9, Górnik Zabrze 5, Lech Poznań 2.)	
10	Górnik Zabrze	30	10	7	13	31	33	−2	37	
11	Lech Poznań	30	9	10	11	39	38	+1	37	
12	Wisła Płock	30	8	9	13	37	44	−7	33 (Note: Head-to-head matches: Wisła Kraków 0–3 Wisła Płock, Wisła Płock 1–3 Wisła Kraków.)	
13	Wisła Kraków	30	8	9	13	39	42	−3	33	
14	Cracovia (Note: Cracovia was deducted 5 points for match-fixing during the 2003–04 II liga season (second tier at the time).)	30	8	13	9	28	32	−4	32	
15	Stal Mielec	30	6	11	13	31	47	−16	29	
16	Podbeskidzie Bielsko-Biała (R)	30	6	7	17	29	60	−31	25	Relegation to I liga

Source: ekstraklasa.org
Rules for classification: 1) Points; 2) Head-to-head points; 3) Head-to-head goal difference; 4) Head-to-head goals scored; 5) Head-to-head away goals scored (only if between two teams); 6) Goal difference; 7) Goals scored; 8) Number of wins; 9) Number of away wins; 10) Fairplay ranking; 11) Draw
(C) Champions; (R) Relegated

== Positions by round ==
Note: The list does not include the matches postponed to a later date but includes all games played in advance. (Note: The list of postponed matches: Lech Poznań – Pogoń Szczecin (5th round, played on 16 December 2020); Legia Warsaw – Śląsk Wrocław (5th round, played on 21 October 2020); Pogoń Szczecin – Jagiellonia Białystok (6th round, played on 30 October 2020); Wisła Kraków – Lechia Gdańsk (6th round, played on 28 October 2020); Warta Poznań – Legia Warsaw (6th round, played on 2 November 2020); Górnik Zabrze – Piast Gliwice (9th round, played on 20 November 2020); Lechia Gdańsk – Śląsk Wrocław (9th round, played on 20 November 2020); Podbeskidzie Bielsko-Biała – Zagłębie Lubin (9th round, played on 24 November 2020); Wisła Płock – Pogoń Szczecin (9th round, played on 2 December 2020); Stal Mielec - Wisła Płock (16th round, played on 4 March 2021); Stal Mielec – Raków Częstochowa (23rd round, played on 5 May 2021)) (Note: The list of matches played in advance: Śląsk Wrocław – Górnik Zabrze (10th round, played on 7 November 2020); Pogoń Szczecin – Podbeskidzie Bielsko-Biała (10th round, played on 9 November 2020)) The place taken by the team that played fewer matches than the opponents was underlined.

Team ╲ Round	1	2	3	4	5	6	7	8	9	10	11	12	13	14	15	16	17	18	19	20	21	22	23	24	25	26	27	28	29	30
Legia	3	6	4	7	8	9	8	5	2	1	2	1	1	1	2	2	2	1	1	1	1	1	1	1	1	1	1	1	1	1
Raków	10	5	3	2	2	1	1	1	1	2	1	2	2	2	3	3	3	3	3	3	3	3	3	3	3	3	3	3	2	2
Pogoń	10	7	7	5	6	8	6	6	4	5	7	5	3	3	1	1	1	2	2	2	2	2	2	2	2	2	2	2	3	3
Śląsk	2	2	2	4	7	4	5	4	5	7	5	4	6	4	4	4	5	6	5	7	7	7	6	6	7	5	8	8	6	4
Warta	13	14	14	15	12	13	11	12	10	9	10	11	12	14	13	12	11	8	12	10	10	10	8	7	6	8	4	7	8	5
Piast	15	15	15	16	16	16	16	16	16	14	14	13	11	13	11	8	10	12	10	9	9	6	5	4	4	4	6	4	4	6
Lechia	5	8	8	8	4	5	7	8	7	4	6	9	10	8	8	10	8	5	4	4	4	4	4	5	5	6	7	5	5	7
Zagłębie	3	3	5	6	3	3	3	3	6	6	4	6	5	6	7	6	9	10	7	5	8	9	9	9	8	7	5	6	7	8
Jagiellonia	6	4	6	3	5	7	4	7	8	8	8	7	8	7	6	7	6	7	8	12	12	12	12	10	10	11	11	9	11	9
Górnik	1	1	1	1	1	2	2	2	3	3	3	3	4	5	5	5	4	4	6	8	5	5	7	8	9	10	10	11	10	10
Lech	10	10	9	10	10	6	9	10	12	10	9	8	7	9	10	11	12	11	9	6	6	8	10	11	11	9	9	10	9	11
Wisła Płock	6	9	10	9	9	10	10	11	13	13	13	14	13	11	9	9	7	9	13	13	13	13	13	13	13	14	13	14	13	12
Wisła Kraków	6	12	12	13	13	14	12	9	9	11	12	12	14	12	14	13	13	13	11	11	11	11	11	12	12	12	12	13	14	13
Cracovia	16	16	16	14	14	15	13	13	11	12	11	10	9	10	12	14	14	14	14	14	14	14	14	14	14	13	14	12	12	14
Stal	6	13	13	11	11	11	15	14	15	16	15	15	15	15	15	16	16	16	16	16	15	15	16	16	16	15	15	15	15	15
Podbeskidzie	14	11	11	12	15	12	14	15	14	15	16	16	16	16	16	15	15	15	15	15	16	16	15	15	15	16	16	16	16	16

Qualification for the Champions League first qualifying round
Qualification for the Europa Conference League second qualifying round
Qualification for the Europa Conference League first qualifying round
Relegation to I liga

Source: ekstraklasa.org

== Results ==
Home \ Away	CRA	GÓR	JAG	LPO	LGD	LEG	PIA	POD	POG	RAK	STA	ŚLĄ	WAR	WIS	WPŁ	ZAG
Cracovia	—	1–0	3–1	2–1	0–3	0–1	1–0	1–1	2–1	2–2	1–1	1–1	0–1	1–1	1–0	2–4
Górnik Zabrze	0–2	—	3–1	1–1	3–0	1–2	1–2	4–2	2–1	1–3	2–1	1–1	1–2	0–0	0–2	2–0
Jagiellonia Białystok	2–1	1–0	—	2–1	2–1	1–1	0–1	2–2	0–1	0–0	3–3	0–1	4–3	1–1	5–2	0–1
Lech Poznań	1–1	1–1	2–3	—	3–0	0–0	0–0	4–0	0–4	3–3	1–2	1–0	1–0	0–1	2–2	0–0
Lechia Gdańsk	1–1	2–0	0–2	0–1	—	0–1	2–2	4–0	0–1	1–3	4–2	3–2	1–1	2–0	0–1	3–1
Legia Warsaw	0–0	1–3	1–2	2–1	2–0	—	2–2	1–0	4–2	2–0	2–3	2–1	3–2	0–0	5–2	2–1
Piast Gliwice	2–0	2–0	0–1	1–4	2–0	0–1	—	2–0	0–1	0–0	2–1	2–0	0–1	2–3	2–2	1–1
Podbeskidzie Bielsko-Biała	2–2	2–1	1–1	1–0	2–2	1–0	0–5	—	0–2	1–4	1–0	0–2	1–2	2–0	1–1	2–1
Pogoń Szczecin	1–0	1–0	3–0	0–1	1–0	0–0	0–0	1–1	—	1–3	2–0	1–0	1–1	2–2	2–0	1–0
Raków Częstochowa	0–0	0–0	3–2	3–1	0–1	1–2	1–0	1–0	0–1	—	2–1	2–0	1–0	0–0	3–0	2–1
Stal Mielec	0–0	0–2	3–1	1–1	0–1	0–0	3–2	2–1	1–0	0–1	—	0–0	0–1	0–6	2–2	0–2
Śląsk Wrocław	3–1	0–0	1–0	3–3	1–1	0–1	2–0	4–3	2–1	1–0	1–1	—	2–1	1–1	0–0	0–0
Warta Poznań	1–0	0–1	2–0	1–2	0–1	0–3	0–0	2–0	1–2	0–2	0–0	2–3	—	2–1	2–0	1–0
Wisła Kraków	0–0	0–0	2–0	1–2	1–3	1–2	3–4	3–0	2–1	1–2	3–1	1–3	0–1	—	0–3	1–2
Wisła Płock	0–1	0–1	2–2	1–0	1–3	0–1	0–1	4–1	0–0	2–2	1–1	1–0	1–3	1–3	—	4–0
Zagłębie Lubin	1–1	2–0	3–0	2–1	1–1	0–4	2–2	2–1	1–1	1–2	2–2	2–1	1–0	4–1	0–2	—

Source: ekstraklasa.org
Legend: Blue = home team win; Yellow = draw; Red = away team win.
For upcoming matches, an "a" indicates there is an article about the rivalry between the two participants.

== Season statistics ==
=== Top goalscorers ===
Rank	Player	Club	Goals
1	(Czech Republic) Tomáš Pekhart	Legia Warsaw	22
2	(Poland) Jakub Świerczok	Piast Gliwice	15
3	(Sweden) Mikael Ishak	Lech Poznań	12
3	(Spain) Jesús Jiménez	Górnik Zabrze	12
3	(Portugal) Flávio Paixão	Lechia Gdańsk	12
6	(Poland) Kamil Biliński	Podbeskidzie Bielsko-Biała	11
6	(Spain) Jesús Imaz	Jagiellonia Białystok	11
6	(Croatia) Jakov Puljić	Jagiellonia Białystok	11
9	(Spain) Ivi	Raków Częstochowa	9
9	(Spain) Erik Expósito	Śląsk Wrocław	9

=== Top assists ===
Rank	Player	Club	Assists
1	(Poland) Mateusz Szwoch	Wisła Płock	10
2	(Croatia) Josip Juranović	Legia Warsaw	8
2	(Poland) Filip Starzyński	Zagłębie Lubin	8
4	(Poland) Marcin Cebula	Raków Częstochowa	7
4	(Czech Republic) Tomáš Přikryl	Jagiellonia Białystok	7
4	(Poland) Łukasz Trałka	Warta Poznań	7
7	(Poland) Maciej Domański	Stal Mielec	6
7	(Spain) Jesús Imaz	Jagiellonia Białystok	6
7	(Poland) Rafał Pietrzak	Lechia Gdańsk	6
7	(Czech Republic) Martin Pospíšil	Jagiellonia Białystok	6
7	(Portugal) Pedro Tiba	Lech Poznań	6

=== Hat-tricks ===
Player	For	Against	Result	Date	Ref
(Spain) Jesús Jiménez	Górnik Zabrze	Podbeskidzie Bielsko-Biała	4–2 (H)	23 August 2020	
(Croatia) Jakov Puljić	Jagiellonia Białystok	Wisła Płock	5–2 (H)	23 November 2020	
(Croatia) Jakov Puljić	Jagiellonia Białystok	Warta Poznań	4–3 (H)	5 December 2020	
(Czech Republic) Tomáš Pekhart ^{4}	Legia Warsaw	Zagłębie Lubin	0–4 (A)	21 March 2021	

- ^{4} Player scored four goals.

== Attendances ==
Pos	Team	Total	High	Low	Average	Change
1	Lech Poznań	30,662	17,546	0	10,220	−21.9%
2	Górnik Zabrze	30,130	12,492	0	10,043	−9.0%
3	Legia Warsaw	27,491	11,510	0	9,163	−38.3%
4	Śląsk Wrocław	33,685	11,535	0	8,421	−31.7%
5	Wisła Kraków	12,051	7,007	0	6,025	−56.1%
6	Jagiellonia Białystok	20,588	5,881	0	5,147	−36.6%
7	Lechia Gdańsk	14,808	5,424	0	4,936	−48.6%
8	Cracovia	18,289	5,439	0	4,572	−42.3%
9	Podbeskidzie Bielsko-Biała	11,692	4,397	0	3,897	+2.6%^{1}
10	Stal Mielec	6,134	3,420	0	3,067	+2.2%^{1}
11	Zagłębie Lubin	11,869	3,968	0	2,967	−12.5%
12	Piast Gliwice	10,806	3,215	0	2,701	−27.3%
13	Warta Poznań	4,253	2,381	0	2,126	+203.7%^{1}
14	Pogoń Szczecin	5,821	2,123	0	1,940	−38.3%
15	Raków Częstochowa	5,291	1,985	0	1,743	−28.9%
16	Wisła Płock	4,979	1,500	0	1,244	−65.6%
	League total	248,549	17,546	0	4,874	−28.4%

Updated to games played on 17 May 2021.
Source: Ekstraklasa (in Polish)
Notes:
1. Team played last season in I liga.

== Awards ==
=== Monthly awards ===
==== Player of the Month ====
Month	Player	Club
August 2020	(Spain) Jesús Jiménez	Górnik Zabrze
September 2020	(Poland) Bartosz Nowak	Górnik Zabrze
October 2020	(Spain) Ivi	Raków Częstochowa
November 2020	(Poland) Jakub Świerczok	Piast Gliwice
December 2020	(Poland) Jakub Świerczok	Piast Gliwice
February 2021	(Poland) Bartosz Kapustka	Legia Warsaw
March 2021	(Czech Republic) Tomáš Pekhart	Legia Warsaw
April 2021	(Poland) Jakub Świerczok	Piast Gliwice
May 2021	(Poland) Jakub Świerczok	Piast Gliwice

==== Young Player of the Month ====
Month	Player	Club
August 2020	(Poland) Mateusz Praszelik	Śląsk Wrocław
September 2020	(Poland) Adrian Gryszkiewicz	Górnik Zabrze
October 2020	(Poland) Karol Niemczycki	Cracovia
November 2020	(Poland) Kacper Chodyna	Zagłębie Lubin
December 2020	(Poland) Kacper Kozłowski	Pogoń Szczecin
February 2021	(Poland) Xavier Dziekoński	Jagiellonia Białystok
March 2021	(Poland) Kamil Piątkowski	Raków Częstochowa
April 2021	(Poland) Kamil Piątkowski	Raków Częstochowa
May 2021	(Poland) Rafał Strączek	Stal Mielec

==== Coach of the Month ====
Month	Coach	Club
August 2020	(Poland) Marcin Brosz	Górnik Zabrze
September 2020	(Poland) Marcin Brosz	Górnik Zabrze
October 2020	(Poland) Marek Papszun	Raków Częstochowa
November 2020	(Poland) Czesław Michniewicz	Legia Warsaw
December 2020	(Germany) Kosta Runjaić	Pogoń Szczecin
February 2021	(Poland) Piotr Tworek	Warta Poznań
March 2021	(Poland) Czesław Michniewicz	Legia Warsaw
April 2021	(Poland) Marek Papszun	Raków Częstochowa
May 2021	(Poland) Marek Papszun	Raków Częstochowa

=== Annual awards ===
Award	Player	Club
Goalkeeper of the Season	(Croatia) Dante Stipica	Pogoń Szczecin
Defender of the Season	(Serbia) Filip Mladenović	Legia Warsaw
Midfielder of the Season	(Brazil) Luquinhas	Legia Warsaw
Forward of the Season	(Czech Republic) Tomáš Pekhart	Legia Warsaw
Coach of the Season	(Poland) Marek Papszun	Raków Częstochowa
Young player of the season	(Poland) Kamil Piątkowski	Raków Częstochowa
Player of the Season	(Serbia) Filip Mladenović	Legia Warsaw
Top Scorer of the season	(Czech Republic) Tomáš Pekhart	Legia Warsaw
Goal of the season	(Spain) Jesús Imaz	Jagiellonia Białystok

Team of the Season
Goalkeeper	(Poland) Dante Stipica (Pogoń Szczecin)			
Defenders	(Serbia) Filip Mladenović (Legia Warsaw)	(Germany) Benedikt Zech (Pogoń Szczecin)	(Poland) Kamil Piątkowski (Raków Częstochowa)	(Croatia) Josip Juranović (Legia Warsaw)
Midfielders	(Poland) Bartosz Kapustka (Legia Warsaw)	(Brazil) Luquinhas (Legia Warsaw)		(Poland) Marcin Cebula (Raków Częstochowa)
Forwards	(Poland) Jakub Świerczok (Piast Gliwice)	(Czech Republic) Tomáš Pekhart (Legia Warsaw)		(Spain) Jesús Imaz (Jagiellonia Białystok)

== See also ==
- 2020–21 I liga
- 2020–21 II liga
- 2020–21 III liga
- 2020–21 Polish Cup
- 2020 Polish Super Cup
