= 2021–22 Ekstraklasa =

96th season of top-tier football league in Poland

Ekstraklasa
- Season: 2021–22
- Dates: 23 July 2021 – 21 May 2022
- Champions: Lech Poznań (8th title)
- Relegated: Górnik Łęczna; Wisła Kraków; BB Termalica Nieciecza
- Champions League: Lech Poznań
- Europa Conference League: Raków Częstochowa; Pogoń Szczecin; Lechia Gdańsk
- Matches: 306
- Goals: 818 (2.67 per match)
- Top goalscorer: Ivi López (20 goals)
- Biggest home win: Lech 5–0 Wisła K. (17 September 2021); Raków 5–0 Jagiellonia (18 December 2021); Lech 5–0 Termalica (12 February 2022)
- Biggest away win: Wisła K. 0–5 Śląsk (23 October 2021); Radomiak 1–6 Zagłębie (6 May 2022)
- Highest scoring: Legia 5–3 Górnik (6 May 2022)
- Longest winning run: 6 matches Radomiak Radom; Lech Poznań
- Longest unbeaten run: 14 matches Raków Częstochowa
- Longest winless run: 10 matches Warta Poznań
- Longest losing run: 7 matches Legia Warsaw
- Highest attendance: 41,008; Lech 2–1 Zagłębie (21 May 2022)
- Lowest attendance: 0 (Note: Match have been played behind closed doors without any spectators.); Radomiak 2–2 Piast (14 December 2021)
- Total attendance: 2,249,931 (Note: Due to the COVID-19 pandemic some matches have been played with a limited number of spectators.)
- Average attendance: 7,353 ▲50.9%

The 2021–22 Ekstraklasa (also known as PKO Bank Polski Ekstraklasa due to its sponsorship by PKO Bank Polski) was the 96th season of the Polish Football Championship, the 88th season of the highest tier domestic division in the Polish football league system since its establishment in 1927 and the 14th season of the Ekstraklasa under its current title. The league is operated by the Ekstraklasa S.A.

The regular season was played as a round-robin tournament. A total of 18 teams participated, 15 of which competed in the league campaign during the previous season, while the remaining three were promoted from the 2020–21 I liga. The season started on 23 July 2021 and concluded on 21 May 2022. Each team played a total of 34 matches, half at home and half away. It was the first season in the formula with 18 teams, instead of 16. The bottom three teams of the final league table were relegated. It was the fifth Ekstraklasa season to use VAR.

Legia Warsaw were the defending champions, who won their 15th Polish title the previous season. Lech Poznań clinched their 8th Ekstraklasa title on 14 May after winning 1–2 away against Warta Poznań and after Raków Częstochowa lost 0–1 away against Zagłębie Lubin, both with one game remaining. The season's runner-up was Raków Częstochowa, and the third-placed team was Pogoń Szczecin.

== Teams ==
A total of 18 teams participated in the 2021–22 Ekstraklasa season.

=== Changes from last season ===
Podbeskidzie Bielsko-Biała had been relegated to 2021–22 I liga, ending their one-year stay in the top flight. The 2021–22 season is Radomiak Radom’s first season in the top flight since the 1984–85 season, and their first season after the league’s name change in 2008. Bruk-Bet Termalica Nieciecza returned to the top flight after 3 years, having last played in the 2017–18 season. The third, and last team, to be promoted was Górnik Łęczna, returning after a four-year absence.

Promoted from 2020–21 I liga	Relegated from 2020–21 Ekstraklasa
▲ Radomiak Radom (1st) ▲ Bruk-Bet Termalica Nieciecza (2nd) ▲ Górnik Łęczna (PO)	▼ Podbeskidzie Bielsko-Biała (16th)

=== Stadiums and locations ===
Note: Table lists in alphabetical order.

Location of teams in 2021–22 Ekstraklasa.
Location of teams in the Katowice urban area

Team	Location	Venue	Capacity
Bruk-Bet Termalica Nieciecza	Nieciecza	Stadion Bruk-Bet Termalica	4,666
Cracovia	Kraków	Stadion im. Józefa Piłsudskiego	15,114
Górnik Łęczna	Łęczna	Stadion Górnika	7,464
Górnik Zabrze	Zabrze	Stadion im. Ernesta Pohla	24,563^{1}
Jagiellonia Białystok	Białystok	Stadion Miejski	22,432
Lech Poznań	Poznań	Stadion Poznań	43,269
Lechia Gdańsk	Gdańsk	Polsat Plus Arena Gdańsk	43,615
Legia Warsaw	Warsaw	Stadion Wojska Polskiego	31,800
Piast Gliwice	Gliwice	Stadion im. Piotra Wieczorka	10,037
Pogoń Szczecin	Szczecin	Stadion im. Floriana Krygiera	9,300^{2}
Radomiak Radom	Radom	Stadion Lekkoatletyczno-Piłkarski^{3}	4,501
Raków Częstochowa	Częstochowa	Miejski Stadion Piłkarski Raków	5,500
Stal Mielec	Mielec	Stadion Miejski	6,864
Śląsk Wrocław	Wrocław	Tarczyński Arena Wrocław	45,105
Warta Poznań	Poznań	Stadion Dyskobolii^{4}	5,383
Wisła Kraków	Kraków	Stadion im. Henryka Reymana	33,326
Wisła Płock	Płock	Stadion im. Kazimierza Górskiego	3,500^{5}
Zagłębie Lubin	Lubin	Stadion Miejski	16,068

1. Upgrading to 31,871.
2. Upgrading to 21,163.
3. Due to the renovation of Stadion im. Braci Czachorów in Radom, Radomiak will play home matches at the Stadion Lekkoatletyczno-Piłkarski in Radom.
4. Due to the renovation of Dębińska Road Stadium in Poznań, Warta will play home matches at the Stadion Dyskobolii in Grodzisk Wielkopolski.
5. Upgrading to 15,000.

Bruk-Bet Termalica	Cracovia	Górnik Łęczna	Górnik Zabrze	Jagiellonia	Lech
Stadion Bruk-Bet Termalica	Stadion im. Józefa Piłsudskiego	Stadion Górnika	Stadion im. Ernesta Pohla	Stadion Miejski	Stadion Poznań
Capacity: 4,666	Capacity: 15,114	Capacity: 7,464	Capacity: 24,563	Capacity: 22,432	Capacity: 43,269
Lechia	Legia	Piast	Pogoń	Radomiak	Raków
Polsat Plus Arena Gdańsk	Stadion Wojska Polskiego	Stadion im. Piotra Wieczorka	Stadion im. Floriana Krygiera	Stadion Lekkoatletyczno-Piłkarski	Miejski Stadion Piłkarski Raków
Capacity: 43,615	Capacity: 31,800	Capacity: 10,037	Capacity: 9,300	Capacity: 4,501	Capacity: 5,500
Stal	Śląsk	Warta	Wisła Kraków	Wisła Płock	Zagłębie
Stadion Miejski	Tarczyński Arena Wrocław	Stadion Dyskobolii	Stadion im. Henryka Reymana	Stadion im. Kazimierza Górskiego	Stadion Miejski
Capacity: 6,864	Capacity: 45,105	Capacity: 5,383	Capacity: 33,326	Capacity: 3,500	Capacity: 16,068

=== Personnel and kits ===
Team	Chairman	Head coach	Appointment Date	Captain	Manufacturer	Strategic sponsor
Bruk-Bet Termalica Nieciecza	(Poland) Danuta Witkowska	(Czech Republic) Radoslav Látal	10 January 2022	(Poland) Piotr Wlazło	Adidas	Bruk-Bet
Cracovia	(Poland) Janusz Filipiak	(Poland) Jacek Zieliński	10 November 2021	(Romania) Sergiu Hanca	Puma	Comarch
Górnik Łęczna	(Poland) Piotr Sadczuk	(Poland) Marcin Prasoł	7 April 2022	(Poland) Maciej Gostomski	Jako	Bogdanka
Górnik Zabrze	(Poland) Dariusz Czernik	(Poland) Jan Urban	27 May 2021	(Poland) Przemysław Wiśniewski	Hummel	Węglokoks
Jagiellonia Białystok	(Poland) Agnieszka Syczewska	(Poland) Piotr Nowak	23 December 2021	(Poland) Taras Romanczuk	Kappa	STS
Lech Poznań	(Poland) Karol Klimczak (Poland) Piotr Rutkowski	(Poland) Maciej Skorża	12 April 2021	(Sweden) Mikael Ishak	Macron	STS
Lechia Gdańsk	(Poland) Paweł Żelem	(Poland) Tomasz Kaczmarek	1 September 2021	(Portugal) Flávio Paixão	New Balance	Energa
Legia Warsaw	(Poland) Dariusz Mioduski	(Serbia) Aleksandar Vuković	13 December 2021	(Poland) Artur Jędrzejczyk	Adidas	Plus500
Piast Gliwice	(Poland) Grzegorz Bednarski	(Poland) Waldemar Fornalik	19 September 2017	(Poland) Jakub Czerwiński	Adidas	Betclic, Kar-Tel
Pogoń Szczecin	(Poland) Jarosław Mroczek	(Germany) Kosta Runjaić	6 November 2017	(Poland) Damian Dąbrowski	Capelli Sport	
Radomiak Radom	(Poland) Sławomir Stempniewski	(Poland) Mariusz Lewandowski	25 April 2022	(Poland) Maciej Świdzikowski	Joma	Enea
Raków Częstochowa	(Poland) Wojciech Cygan	(Poland) Marek Papszun	18 April 2016	(Poland) Andrzej Niewulis	Macron	x-kom, forBET
Stal Mielec	(Poland) Jacek Klimek	(Poland) Adam Majewski	8 July 2021	(Poland) Krystian Getinger	Adidas	PGE
Śląsk Wrocław	(Poland) Piotr Waśniewski	(Poland) Piotr Tworek	9 March 2022	(Poland) Krzysztof Mączyński	Adidas	LV BET
Warta Poznań	(Poland) Bartosz Wolny	(Poland) Dawid Szulczek	8 November 2021	(Poland) Bartosz Kieliba	Nike	TOTALbet, BeGreen
Wisła Kraków	(Poland) Dawid Błaszczykowski	(Poland) Jerzy Brzęczek	14 February 2022	(Poland) Jakub Błaszczykowski	Macron	Orlen Oil, Socios Wisła
Wisła Płock	(Poland) Tomasz Marzec	(Slovakia) Pavol Staňo	7 March 2022	(Poland) Jakub Rzeźniczak	Adidas	PKN Orlen
Zagłębie Lubin	(Poland) Michał Kielan	(Poland) Piotr Stokowiec	21 December 2021	(Montenegro) Saša Balić	Nike	KGHM

=== Managerial changes ===
Team	Outgoing manager	Manner of departure	Date of vacancy	Position in table	Incoming manager	Date of appointment
Górnik Zabrze	(Poland) Marcin Brosz	End of contract	27 May 2021	Pre-season	(Poland) Jan Urban	27 May 2021
Jagiellonia Białystok	(Poland) Rafał Grzyb	End of caretaker spell	4 June 2021	Pre-season	(Poland) Ireneusz Mamrot	4 June 2021
Wisła Kraków	(Poland) Kazimierz Kmiecik	End of caretaker spell	7 June 2021	Pre-season	(Slovakia) Adrián Guľa	7 June 2021
Zagłębie Lubin	(Slovakia) Martin Ševela	Signed for Abha Club	1 July 2021	Pre-season	(Poland) Dariusz Żuraw	16 July 2021
Stal Mielec	(Poland) Włodzimierz Gąsior	Resigned	8 July 2021	Pre-season	(Poland) Adam Majewski	9 July 2021
Lechia Gdańsk	(Poland) Piotr Stokowiec	Mutual consent	28 August 2021	6th	(Poland) Tomasz Kaczmarek	1 September 2021
Legia Warsaw	(Poland) Czesław Michniewicz	Sacked	25 October 2021	15th	(Poland) Marek Gołębiewski	25 October 2021
Warta Poznań	(Poland) Piotr Tworek	Sacked	2 November 2021	17th	(Poland) Dawid Szulczek	8 November 2021
Cracovia	(Poland) Michał Probierz	Mutual consent	9 November 2021	11th	(Poland) Jacek Zieliński	10 November 2021
Legia Warsaw	(Poland) Marek Gołębiewski	Resigned	13 December 2021	18th	(Serbia) Aleksandar Vuković	13 December 2021
Bruk-Bet Termalica Nieciecza	(Poland) Mariusz Lewandowski	Sacked	13 December 2021	17th	(Poland) Waldemar Piątek	13 December 2021
Zagłębie Lubin	(Poland) Dariusz Żuraw	Sacked	16 December 2021	13th	(Poland) Paweł Karmelita	16 December 2021
Zagłębie Lubin	(Poland) Paweł Karmelita	End of caretaker spell	21 December 2021	14th	(Poland) Piotr Stokowiec	21 December 2021
Jagiellonia Białystok	(Poland) Ireneusz Mamrot	Sacked	23 December 2021	10th	(Poland) Piotr Nowak	23 December 2021
Bruk-Bet Termalica Nieciecza	(Poland) Waldemar Piątek	End of caretaker spell	6 January 2022	18th	(Poland) Michał Probierz	6 January 2022
Bruk-Bet Termalica Nieciecza	(Poland) Michał Probierz	Resigned	8 January 2022	18th	(Czech Republic) Radoslav Látal	10 January 2022
Wisła Kraków	(Slovakia) Adrián Guľa	Sacked	13 February 2022	13th	(Poland) Jerzy Brzęczek	14 February 2022
Wisła Płock	(Poland) Maciej Bartoszek	Sacked	28 February 2022	10th	(Poland) Łukasz Nadolski	28 February 2022
Wisła Płock	(Poland) Łukasz Nadolski	End of caretaker spell	7 March 2022	7th	(Slovakia) Pavol Staňo	7 March 2022
Śląsk Wrocław	(Poland) Jacek Magiera	Sacked	8 March 2022	13th	(Poland) Piotr Tworek	9 March 2022
Górnik Łęczna	(Poland) Kamil Kiereś	Resigned	4 April 2022	17th	(Poland) Marcin Prasoł	7 April 2022
Radomiak Radom	(Poland) Dariusz Banasik	Sacked	25 April 2022	6th	(Poland) Mariusz Lewandowski	25 April 2022

- Italics for interim managers.

== League table ==
Pos	Team	Pld	W	D	L	GF	GA	GD	Pts	Qualification or relegation
1	Lech Poznań (C)	34	22	8	4	67	24	+43	74	Qualification for the Champions League first qualifying round
2	Raków Częstochowa	34	20	9	5	60	30	+30	69	Qualification for the Europa Conference League second qualifying round
3	Pogoń Szczecin	34	18	11	5	63	31	+32	65	Qualification for the Europa Conference League first qualifying round (Note: Since the winners of the 2021–22 Polish Cup, Raków Częstochowa, qualified for the Europa Conference League based on league position, the second Europa Conference League first qualifying round berth was transferred to the 4th-placed team.)
4	Lechia Gdańsk	34	16	9	9	52	39	+13	57	Qualification for the Europa Conference League first qualifying round
5	Piast Gliwice	34	15	9	10	45	37	+8	54	
6	Wisła Płock	34	15	3	16	48	51	−3	48	
7	Radomiak Radom	34	11	15	8	42	40	+2	48	
8	Górnik Zabrze	34	13	8	13	55	55	0	47	
9	Cracovia	34	12	10	12	40	42	−2	46	
10	Legia Warsaw	34	13	4	17	46	48	−2	43	
11	Warta Poznań	34	11	9	14	35	38	−3	42	
12	Jagiellonia Białystok	34	9	13	12	39	50	−11	40	
13	Zagłębie Lubin	34	11	5	18	43	59	−16	38	
14	Stal Mielec	34	9	10	15	39	52	−13	37	
15	Śląsk Wrocław	34	7	14	13	42	52	−10	35	
16	Bruk-Bet Termalica Nieciecza (R)	34	7	11	16	36	56	−20	32	Relegation to I liga
17	Wisła Kraków (R)	34	7	10	17	37	54	−17	31	Relegation to I liga
18	Górnik Łęczna (R)	34	6	10	18	29	60	−31	28	Relegation to I liga

Source: ekstraklasa.org
Rules for classification: 1) Points; 2) Head-to-head points; 3) Head-to-head goal difference; 4) Goal difference; 5) Goals scored; 6) Number of wins; 7) Number of away wins; 8) Lower number of points based on yellow and red cards (red card = 3 points, yellow card = 1 point, sending-off = 3 points - including 1 point for first yellow card); 9) Fairplay ranking; 10) Draw. (Note: Head-to-head record is used only after all the matches between the teams in question have been played)
(C) Champions; (R) Relegated

== Positions by round ==
Note: The place taken by the team that played fewer matches than the opponents was underlined. (Note: The list of postponed matches: Legia Warsaw – Zagłębie Lubin (3rd round, played on 15 December 2021); Raków Częstochowa – Radomiak Radom (4th round, played on 29 September 2021); Raków Częstochowa – Górnik Zabrze (5th round, played on 15 December 2021); Legia Warsaw – Bruk-Bet Termalica Nieciecza (5th round, played on 15 March 2022); Radomiak Radom – Piast Gliwice (17th round, played on 14 December 2021))

Team ╲ Round	1	2	3	4	5	6	7	8	9	10	11	12	13	14	15	16	17	18	19	20	21	22	23	24	25	26	27	28	29	30	31	32	33	34
Lech Poznań	13	3	1	1	1	1	1	1	1	1	1	1	1	1	1	1	1	1	1	1	1	2	1	3	3	3	3	1	1	2	2	1	1	1
Raków Częstochowa	3	11	4	9	11	10	10	6	6	4	3	2	4	4	4	4	4	4	3	3	3	3	3	2	1	2	2	3	3	1	1	2	2	2
Pogoń Szczecin	2	4	3	4	2	2	3	3	4	3	4	4	3	3	3	2	2	2	2	2	2	1	2	1	2	1	1	2	2	3	3	3	3	3
Lechia Gdańsk	7	7	7	2	3	6	5	4	3	2	2	3	2	2	2	3	3	3	5	4	5	4	5	4	5	4	4	4	4	4	4	4	4	4
Piast Gliwice	15	8	10	5	4	4	6	10	13	8	10	7	7	8	11	8	11	12	12	12	11	10	9	9	8	6	7	7	5	5	5	5	5	5
Wisła Płock	16	17	13	15	9	9	13	8	11	14	12	14	12	10	9	7	9	7	6	7	8	9	10	7	7	8	6	6	7	6	6	6	8	6
Radomiak Radom	13	4	9	13	7	7	7	9	12	11	13	10	6	5	5	5	5	5	4	5	4	5	4	5	4	5	5	5	6	7	7	7	6	7
Górnik Zabrze	17	18	14	10	11	14	15	11	14	9	14	13	13	14	12	9	7	8	7	6	6	6	6	6	6	7	8	8	9	9	9	9	9	8
Cracovia	7	14	16	18	15	12	12	14	8	10	6	6	8	11	10	12	10	11	9	9	9	7	7	10	9	10	9	10	8	8	8	8	7	9
Legia Warsaw	4	10	12	8	10	13	16	12	15	15	15	15	16	17	17	16	16	18	17	16	17	17	16	13	12	11	10	9	10	10	12	10	10	10
Warta Poznań	5	12	5	11	14	16	14	16	16	17	17	16	17	16	16	17	17	15	16	17	14	13	13	15	14	12	13	12	11	11	11	11	11	11
Jagiellonia Białystok	7	2	2	3	8	8	8	13	7	6	7	9	9	9	7	11	12	10	11	11	10	11	11	11	11	14	12	11	12	12	13	13	14	12
Zagłębie Lubin	18	9	11	6	13	15	9	5	5	7	9	11	11	12	13	14	14	13	14	14	16	14	15	14	13	15	15	15	15	15	15	14	12	13
Stal Mielec	7	16	17	14	15	11	11	15	10	12	8	8	10	7	7	10	8	6	8	8	7	8	8	8	10	9	11	13	13	13	10	12	13	14
Śląsk Wrocław	5	6	6	7	5	3	2	2	2	5	5	5	5	6	6	6	6	9	10	10	12	12	12	12	15	13	14	14	14	14	14	15	15	15
Termalica Nieciecza	7	12	15	16	17	17	18	18	17	16	16	17	15	15	15	15	15	17	18	18	18	18	18	18	18	18	17	17	18	17	17	17	17	16
Wisła Kraków	1	1	8	12	6	5	4	7	9	13	11	12	14	13	14	13	13	14	13	13	13	15	17	17	16	16	16	16	16	16	16	16	16	17
Górnik Łęczna	7	15	18	17	18	18	17	17	18	18	18	18	18	18	18	18	18	16	15	15	15	16	14	16	17	17	18	18	17	18	18	18	18	18

Qualification for the Champions League first qualifying round
Qualification for the Europa Conference League second qualifying round
Qualification for the Europa Conference League first qualifying round
Relegation to I liga

Source: 90minut.pl

== Results ==
Home \ Away	BBT	CRA	GKŁ	GÓR	JAG	LPO	LGD	LEG	PIA	POG	RAD	RAK	STA	ŚLĄ	WAR	WIS	WPŁ	ZAG
Bruk-Bet Termalica Nieciecza	—	1–2	1–1	3–1	2–1	1–3	0–2	0–0	0–1	1–3	1–1	0–3	1–1	4–3	1–0	2–2	1–0	0–2
Cracovia	1–2	—	0–2	2–2	2–1	3–3	2–0	1–0	0–1	1–1	1–2	1–0	3–3	1–2	2–0	0–0	3–0	1–0
Górnik Łęczna	1–1	1–1	—	1–2	0–1	1–1	0–4	0–1	1–1	0–4	1–0	0–0	2–0	1–1	0–4	1–3	3–2	2–1
Górnik Zabrze	1–1	3–0	4–2	—	1–2	1–3	1–3	3–2	0–1	2–2	0–0	1–1	1–0	3–1	1–0	0–1	4–2	0–0
Jagiellonia Białystok	1–0	0–0	1–2	1–3	—	1–0	1–1	2–2	3–3	1–2	1–1	3–0	1–1	1–1	1–1	3–1	0–1	2–1
Lech Poznań	5–0	2–0	3–0	2–1	3–0	—	2–0	1–1	1–0	1–1	0–0	0–1	3–1	4–0	2–0	5–0	4–1	2–1
Lechia Gdańsk	2–0	3–0	2–0	1–1	1–2	1–0	—	3–1	1–0	0–0	2–2	3–1	3–2	2–0	2–0	1–1	1–0	2–1
Legia Warsaw	4–1	3–0	3–1	5–3	1–0	0–1	2–1	—	0–1	0–2	0–3	2–3	1–3	1–0	0–1	2–1	1–0	4–0
Piast Gliwice	2–1	2–4	1–0	0–0	2–1	1–2	1–0	4–1	—	0–2	1–1	2–3	1–1	1–1	0–1	1–0	4–3	0–1
Pogoń Szczecin	2–2	1–1	4–1	2–0	4–1	0–3	5–1	3–1	1–0	—	4–0	1–2	4–1	2–1	1–1	4–1	1–2	2–1
Radomiak Radom	1–1	0–1	3–1	1–0	2–2	2–1	2–0	3–1	2–2	1–1	—	0–1	1–1	1–1	1–0	4–2	1–1	1–6
Raków Częstochowa	3–2	1–1	2–1	1–2	5–0	2–2	3–0	1–1	1–0	0–0	2–2	—	2–1	1–1	3–0	2–0	2–0	4–0
Stal Mielec	1–0	1–2	2–0	1–2	1–1	0–0	3–3	2–1	0–2	0–1	1–0	0–3	—	1–1	0–1	2–1	2–1	4–2
Śląsk Wrocław	0–4	0–2	0–0	3–4	2–2	0–1	1–1	1–0	1–3	1–1	0–0	1–2	2–1	—	2–2	1–1	3–1	0–0
Warta Poznań	0–0	1–0	1–1	2–1	1–1	1–2	0–2	0–2	2–3	1–1	3–1	0–2	0–0	2–1	—	1–1	1–2	0–2
Wisła Kraków	3–0	1–0	0–0	4–1	0–0	1–1	2–2	1–0	2–2	0–1	0–1	1–2	0–1	0–5	0–1	—	3–4	3–0
Wisła Płock	1–1	2–1	3–1	3–2	3–0	0–1	1–0	1–0	0–2	1–0	1–0	1–1	3–0	1–2	0–3	2–0	—	4–0
Zagłębie Lubin	2–1	1–1	3–1	2–4	0–1	2–3	2–2	1–3	0–0	2–0	0–2	1–0	3–1	1–3	0–4	2–1	3–1	—

Source: ekstraklasa.org
Legend: Blue = home team win; Yellow = draw; Red = away team win.
For upcoming matches, an "a" indicates there is an article about the rivalry between the two participants.

== Results by round ==
Team ╲ Round	1	2	3	4	5	6	7	8	9	10	11	12	13	14	15	16	17	18	19	20	21	22	23	24	25	26	27	28	29	30	31	32	33	34
Bruk-Bet Termalica	D	D	L	L	L	L	D	L	W	D	L	L	W	D	D	L	L	L	L	W	L	D	W	W	L	D	D	L	L	W				
Cracovia	D	L	L	L	W	W	D	D	W	D	W	D	L	L	W	L	W	L	W	D	W	D	L	L	D	L	W	L	W	W				
Górnik Łęczna	D	L	L	D	L	L	W	L	L	L	D	L	D	D	D	L	W	W	W	D	D	D	W	L	L	L	L	L	W	L				
Górnik Zabrze	L	L	W	W	W	L	D	W	L	W	L	D	D	L	W	W	W	D	L	W	L	D	D	W	L	D	L	L	L	W				
Jagiellonia Białystok	D	W	W	L	L	D	D	L	W	W	D	L	D	D	W	L	L	W	L	L	W	D	D	D	L	L	W	D	L	L				
Lech Poznań	D	W	W	W	W	D	D	W	L	W	W	W	D	D	W	W	W	L	W	D	W	L	W	L	D	W	W	D	W	W				
Lechia Gdańsk	D	W	D	W	L	D	D	W	W	W	W	D	W	W	D	L	W	L	L	W	L	W	L	D	L	W	L	W	W	W				
Legia Warsaw	W	L	W	W	W	L	L	W	L	L	L	L	L	L	L	W	L	L	L	W	L	D	W	W	W	D	W	D	L	L				
Piast Gliwice	L	W	L	W	D	W	L	L	L	W	D	W	D	L	L	W	D	L	D	L	W	W	D	D	W	W	W	W	W	W				
Pogoń Szczecin	W	D	W	L	W	D	D	D	W	W	L	W	W	D	W	W	W	D	D	W	W	W	L	W	D	W	W	L	W	W				
Radomiak Radom	D	W	L	D	W	D	D	D	L	D	D	W	W	W	W	W	D	W	W	D	L	L	W	L	L	D	D	D	L	L				
Raków Częstochowa	W	L	W	D	L	D	D	W	W	W	W	W	D	D	L	W	L	W	W	W	W	D	W	W	W	D	W	D	W	W				
Stal Mielec	D	L	L	W	L	W	D	L	W	D	W	D	D	W	D	L	W	W	D	L	W	L	L	D	L	D	L	L	L	L				
Śląsk Wrocław	D	W	D	D	D	W	W	D	W	L	L	W	L	D	L	W	L	L	L	L	D	L	D	L	W	W	L	D	D	L				
Warta Poznań	D	D	W	L	L	D	D	L	L	L	L	D	L	W	L	L	D	W	D	D	W	W	D	L	W	W	L	W	W	L				
Wisła Kraków	W	D	L	L	W	W	D	L	L	L	W	L	L	W	L	L	D	L	W	L	L	D	L	D	D	L	L	W	D	L				
Wisła Płock	L	L	W	L	W	D	L	W	L	L	W	L	W	D	W	W	L	W	W	D	L	L	L	W	W	L	W	W	L	W				
Zagłębie Lubin	L	W	L	W	L	L	W	W	W	L	L	D	D	L	L	L	L	W	L	L	L	W	D	D	W	L	L	W	L	L				

Source: 90minut.pl
W = Win; D = Draw; L = Loss

== Season statistics ==
=== Top goalscorers ===
Rank	Player	Club	Goals
1	(Spain) Ivi	Raków Częstochowa	20
2	(Sweden) Mikael Ishak	Lech Poznań	18
2	(Poland) Karol Angielski	Radomiak Radom	18
4	(Portugal) João Amaral	Lech Poznań	14
4	(Poland) Łukasz Zwoliński	Lechia Gdańsk	14
6	(Poland) Łukasz Sekulski	Wisła Płock	13
7	(Spain) Erik Expósito	Śląsk Wrocław	11
7	(Bosnia and Herzegovina) Muris Mešanović	Bruk-Bet Termalica Nieciecza	11
7	(Poland) Patryk Szysz	Zagłębie Lubin	11
7	(Poland) Bartosz Śpiączka	Górnik Łęczna	11
7	(Slovenia) Luka Zahović	Pogoń Szczecin	11

=== Top assists ===
Rank	Player	Club	Assists
1	(Portugal) Josué	Legia Warsaw	14
2	(Portugal) João Amaral	Lech Poznań	8
3	(Poland) Damian Kądzior	Piast Gliwice	7
3	(Portugal) Joel Pereira	Lech Poznań	7
3	(Croatia) Fran Tudor	Raków Częstochowa	7
3	(Poland) Rafał Wolski	Wisła Płock	7

=== Hat-tricks ===
Player	For	Against	Result	Date	Ref
(Netherlands) Pelle van Amersfoort	Cracovia	Piast Gliwice	2–4 (A)	27 September 2021	
(Spain) Erik Expósito	Śląsk Wrocław	Wisła Kraków	0–5 (A)	23 October 2021	
(Spain) Alberto Toril	Piast Gliwice	Legia Warsaw	4–1 (H)	24 October 2021	
(Poland) Łukasz Zwoliński	Lechia Gdańsk	Stal Mielec	3–2 (H)	9 May 2022	
(Poland) Karol Angielski	Radomiak Radom	Wisła Kraków	4–2 (H)	15 May 2022	

== Attendances ==
Pos	Team	Total	High	Low	Average	Change
1	Lech Poznań	383,514	41,008	9,111	22,560	+120.7%
2	Wisła Kraków	259,679	25,317	10,150	15,275	+153.5%
3	Legia Warsaw	246,554	25,702	10,260	14,503	+58.3%
4	Górnik Zabrze	204,726	23,103	7,438	12,043	+19.9%
5	Śląsk Wrocław	157,872	21,997	5,873	9,287	+10.3%
6	Lechia Gdańsk	149,379	23,574	5,170	8,787	+78.0%
9	Pogoń Szczecin	130,494	9,138	5,923	7,676	+295.7%
7	Cracovia	118,928	14,191	5,749	6,996	+53.0%
8	Jagiellonia Białystok	118,616	15,383	4,421	6,977	+35.6%
10	Raków Częstochowa	72,347	5,500	2,577	4,256	+144.2%
11	Radomiak Radom	65,337	4,491	0	4,084	+221.6%^{1}
12	Piast Gliwice	63,429	6,895	2,339	3,731	+38.1%
14	Stal Mielec	60,040	6,200	2,098	3,546	+15.6%
16	Zagłębie Lubin	53,812	6,072	1,425	3,165	+6.7%
13	Bruk-Bet Termalica Nieciecza	49,124	4,564	2,054	2,890	+132.3%^{1}
15	Górnik Łęczna	48,199	6,006	2,043	2,834	+117.7%^{1}
18	Wisła Płock	36,363	3,105	1,000	2,139	+71.9%
17	Warta Poznań	31,518	4,820	1,088	1,854	−12.8%
	League total	2,249,931	41,008	0	7,353	+50.9%

Source: 90minut.pl (in Polish)
Notes:
1. Team played last season in I liga.

== Awards ==
=== Monthly awards ===
==== Player of the Month ====
Month	Player	Club
July 2021	(Slovakia) Róbert Pich	Śląsk Wrocław
August 2021	(Ghana) Yaw Yeboah	Wisła Kraków
September 2021	(Spain) Ivi	Raków Częstochowa
October 2021	(Poland) Jakub Kamiński	Lech Poznań
November 2021	(Slovenia) Luka Zahović	Pogoń Szczecin
December 2021	(Poland) Bartosz Śpiączka	Górnik Łęczna
February 2022	(Armenia) Vahan Bichakhchyan	Pogoń Szczecin
March 2022	(Portugal) Josué	Legia Warsaw
April 2022	(Spain) Ivi	Raków Częstochowa
May 2022	(Sweden) Mikael Ishak	Lech Poznań

==== Young Player of the Month ====
Month	Player	Club
July 2021	(Poland) Jakub Kamiński	Lech Poznań
August 2021	(Poland) Krzysztof Kubica	Górnik Zabrze
September 2021	(Poland) Mateusz Praszelik	Śląsk Wrocław
October 2021	(Poland) Jakub Kamiński	Lech Poznań
November 2021	(Poland) Filip Majchrowicz	Radomiak Radom
December 2021	(United States) Ben Lederman	Raków Częstochowa
February 2022	(Poland) Michał Rakoczy	Cracovia
March 2022	(Poland) Ariel Mosór	Piast Gliwice
April 2022	(Poland) Michał Skóraś	Lech Poznań
May 2022	(Poland) Krzysztof Kubica	Górnik Zabrze

==== Coach of the Month ====
Month	Coach	Club
July 2021	(Poland) Jacek Magiera	Śląsk Wrocław
August 2021	(Poland) Maciej Skorża	Lech Poznań
September 2021	(Poland) Tomasz Kaczmarek	Lechia Gdańsk
October 2021	(Poland) Maciej Skorża	Lech Poznań
November 2021	(Poland) Dariusz Banasik	Radomiak Radom
December 2021	(Poland) Kamil Kiereś	Górnik Łęczna
February 2022	(Poland) Marek Papszun	Raków Częstochowa
March 2022	(Serbia) Aleksandar Vuković	Legia Warsaw
April 2022	(Poland) Waldemar Fornalik	Piast Gliwice
May 2022	(Poland) Maciej Skorża	Lech Poznań

=== Annual awards ===
Award	Player	Club
Player of the Season	(Spain) Ivi	Raków Częstochowa
Young Player of the Season	(Poland) Jakub Kamiński	Lech Poznań
Goalkeeper of the Season	(Bosnia and Herzegovina) Vladan Kovačević	Raków Częstochowa
Defender of the Season	(Poland) Bartosz Salamon	Lech Poznań
Midfielder of the Season	(Spain) Ivi	Raków Częstochowa
Forward of the Season	(Sweden) Mikael Ishak	Lech Poznań
Coach of the Season	(Poland) Maciej Skorża	Lech Poznań
Goal of the Season	(Poland) Fabian Piasecki	Śląsk Wrocław

== See also ==
- 2021–22 I liga
- 2021–22 II liga
- 2021–22 III liga
- 2021–22 Polish Cup
- 2021 Polish Super Cup
