= Kasperczyk =

Kasperczyk is a Polish surname. Notable people with the surname include:

- Robert Kasperczyk (born 1967), Polish footballer and manager
- Susanne Kasperczyk (born 1985), German footballer
