= Radosław Bella =

Polish association football player and manager

Personal information
- Full name: Radosław Bella
- Date of birth: 9 September 1987 (age 39)
- Place of birth: Kędzierzyn-Koźle, Poland
- Height: 1.81 m (5 ft 11 in)
- Position: Midfielder

Team information
- Current team: Sigma Olomouc (assistant)

Youth career
- 2001–2002: Koksownik Zdzieszowice
- 2002–2003: KS Kędzierzyn-Koźle
- 2003–2005: Koksownik Zdzieszowice
- 2005: Swornica Czarnowąsy
- 2006: Koksownik Zdzieszowice

Senior career*
| Years | Team | Apps | (Gls) |
| 2006 | LKS Poborszów | | |
| 2007 | Ruch Zdzieszowice | | |
| 2007–2010 | TOR Dobrzeń Wielki | 53+ | (5+) |
| 2011 | MKS Oława | 5 | (0) |
| 2011–2014 | Polonia Trzebnica | 75 | (10) |
| 2014 | Sokół Wielka Lipa | | (1) |
| 2015–2017 | LZS Racławiczki | | (8) |
| 2021 | Stal-Śrubiarnia Żywiec | 1 | (0) |

Managerial career
- 2014–2016: Śląsk Wrocław (youth)
- 2015–2016: Miedź Legnica (U13-U14)
- 2016–2017: KŚ AZS Wrocław (women)
- 2017–2019: Miedź Legnica II
- 2019–2021: Śląsk Wrocław (youth)
- 2022: Miedź Legnica (caretaker)
- 2023–2024: Miedź Legnica
- 2024: Lechia Gdańsk (caretaker)
- * Club domestic league appearances and goals

Radosław Bella (born 9 September 1987) is a Polish professional football manager and former player who played as a midfielder. He is currently the assistant manager of Czech First League club Sigma Olomouc.

== Playing career ==
Bella started playing football for the academies of Koksownik Zdzieszowice, KS Kędzierzyn-Koźle, and Swornica Czarnowąsy. His career took off when he joined LKS Poborszów in 2006, playing in the Polish Cup for the first time that season. As a player, Bella spent the majority of his career in the regional divisions, with the high point of his career being with the clubs TOR Dobrzeń Wielki, MKS Oława, and Polonia Trzebnica, with whom he made over 100 appearances in the III liga, Poland's fourth tier.

After playing in the III liga, Bella joined Sokół Wielka Lipa further down the pyramid, and started to move into coaching, joining the Śląsk Wrocław academy system. Bella played for LZS Racławiczki while being the Miedź Legnica II manager, and later KŚ AZS Wrocław women's team manager. After four years out of playing, Bella joined Stal-Śrubiarnia Żywiec for a season before retiring from playing.

== Coaching career ==
As a coach, Bella started with the Śląsk Wrocław academy system, while still playing football. He progressed to managing Miedź Legnica youth teams and coordinating their academy in 2015, and a year later, aged 29, had his first first-team role as the KŚ AZS Wrocław women's team head coach. After his first season with the club, finishing 6th in the Ekstraliga, Bella left his role and returned to Miedź Legnica to manage the reserves team. He held this role for two years, returning to Śląsk Wrocław to manage in their academy for a further two years, before making another step up the coaching ladder upon his third spell with Miedź Legnica.

In 2021, Bella became the assistant manager to Wojciech Łobodziński, a partnership that lasted for 16 months. After a poor start to the 2022–23 Ekstraklasa season, with Miedź getting only five points from their opening 12 games, Łobodziński was sacked and Bella took over as caretaker manager for the following game. In his first Ekstraklasa game, Bella led Miedź to a 1–1 draw against 9th-placed Cracovia. Before the next game, Grzegorz Mokry became the new Miedź manager, with Bella returning to his assistant role. Mokry was in charge for the remainder of the Ekstraklasa season, and with Miedź being relegated to the I liga, Mokry's contract was not extended. On 30 May 2023, Bella would be appointed the club's first team manager. Despite a strong start, in which Miedź were table toppers after matchdays 6 and 7, inconsistent results saw the club starting to slip down the table. After the 26th matchday, and Miedź being in 10th place in the league, Bella was relieved of his duties on 8 April 2024.

A month after his sacking by Miedź, Bella was offered a role as assistant manager with Lechia Gdańsk. His new role saw him linking up with Szymon Grabowski, who had just led Lechia to winning the I liga title. Upon the club's return to the Ekstraklasa, Lechia struggled; after 16 matches, the club had secured only 11 points, and the club were knocked out of the Polish Cup by II liga side Pogoń Grodzisk Mazowiecki. Grabowski was sacked by the club, and Bella, alongside Lechia's technical director Kevin Blackwell, took charge of the club's following match against GKS Katowice. Lechia lost the match 2–0. On 30 November 2024, John Carver became the new Lechia manager, with Bella resuming his position of assistant manager. Carver turned fortunes around, and Lechia secured safety finishing in 14th place, two places above the relegation zone. Bella was seen as an important part of the coaching team that turned Lechia's situation around, and in the summer he was given a new three-year contract with the club. On 29 May 2026, a few days after Lechia's relegation to the I liga and Carver's departure from the club, Bella announced he would not stay at Lechia for the following season.

On 20 June 2026, Czech club Sigma Olomouc announced the appointment of Bella as assistant coach under Pavel Hapal.

== Personal life ==
In 2017, Bella married Anna Tymińska, a former footballer who had previously played for KŚ AZS Wrocław, winning the Ekstraliga, and played in the UEFA Cup. They have two sons.

== Managerial statistics ==
As of match played 30 November 2024

Managerial record by team and tenure
| Team | From | To | Record | | | | | | | |
| Team | From | To | G | W | D | L | GF | GA | GD | Win % |
|---|---|---|---|---|---|---|---|---|---|---|
| Miedź Legnica II | July 2017 | 10 June 2019 | 72 | 27 | 11 | 34 | 108 | 116 | −8 | 37.50 |
| Miedź Legnica (caretaker) | 11 October 2022 | 17 October 2022 | 1 | 0 | 1 | 0 | 1 | 1 | +0 | 0.00 |
| Miedź Legnica | 30 May 2023 | 8 April 2024 | 27 | 9 | 10 | 8 | 35 | 30 | +5 | 33.33 |
| Lechia Gdańsk (caretaker) | 25 November 2024 | 30 November 2024 | 1 | 0 | 0 | 1 | 0 | 2 | −2 | 0.00 |
| Total | | | 101 | 36 | 22 | 43 | 144 | 149 | −5 | 35.64 |

== Honours ==
Individual

- I liga Coach of the Month: July & August 2023
