= Rafał Strączek =

Polish footballer (born 1999)

Personal information
- Full name: Rafał Strączek
- Date of birth: 12 February 1999 (age 27)
- Place of birth: Jarosław, Poland
- Height: 1.88 m (6 ft 2 in)
- Position: Goalkeeper

Team information
- Current team: GKS Katowice
- Number: 13

Youth career
- –2012: JKS 1909 Jarosław
- 2012–2013: UKS SMS Łódź
- 2014–2015: JKS 1909 Jarosław

Senior career*
Years	Team	Apps	(Gls)
2015–2017	JKS 1909 Jarosław	25	(0)
2017	→ Stal Mielec (loan)	2	(0)
2017–2022	Stal Mielec	57	(0)
2018	→ Wólczanka Wólka P. (loan)	11	(0)
2019	→ Motor Lublin (loan)	5	(0)
2022–2024	Bordeaux	19	(0)
2024–	GKS Katowice	22	(0)

International career
2016	Poland U18	1	(0)
- * Club domestic league appearances and goals as of 10:43, 30 May 2026 (UTC)

Rafał Strączek (born 12 February 1999) is a Polish professional footballer who plays as a goalkeeper for Ekstraklasa club GKS Katowice.

== Club career ==
=== Early career ===
Strączek began playing football with his hometown club, JKS 1909 Jarosław. He subsequently spent time in the academy of UKS SMS Łódź before returning to JKS.

He was promoted to the JKS senior team in 2015. Over the following two seasons, he made 25 league appearances in the III liga.

=== Stal Mielec ===
In February 2017, at the age of 17, Strączek joined Stal Mielec, initially on loan from JKS Jarosław. He made two I liga appearances during the remainder of the 2016–17 season before subsequently becoming a permanent Stal player.

During the early part of his time in Mielec, Strączek was loaned to third-tier clubs Wólczanka Wólka Pełkińska and Motor Lublin in order to gain regular playing experience. He made 11 league appearances for Wólczanka during the 2018–19 season and five for Motor in the first half of the following campaign.

Following his return to Stal, Strączek made four appearances during the 2019–20 I liga season as the club won the division and secured promotion to the Ekstraklasa. In July 2020, he signed a new two-year contract with the club.

Strączek made his Ekstraklasa debut on 23 August 2020, starting in a 1–1 away draw against Wisła Płock. He became Stal's regular goalkeeper during the 2020–21 campaign, making 25 league appearances. After conceding three goals in four matches and keeping one clean sheet during May 2021, he was named the Ekstraklasa Young Player of the Month.

On 10 December 2021, Strączek saved two penalties in a 1–0 league victory over Bruk-Bet Termalica Nieciecza. Stal played most of the match with ten men following the dismissal of Krystian Getinger. He became the first goalkeeper to save two penalties in one Ekstraklasa match in the 21st century. He finished the 2021–22 season with 26 league appearances.

=== Bordeaux ===
On 2 February 2022, French club Bordeaux announced that Strączek would join them following the expiry of his Stal contract. He signed a four-year agreement which took effect in July 2022.

During his first season in France, Strączek served mainly as a substitute for Gaëtan Poussin. He made three appearances in Ligue 2 and started three matches in the Coupe de France.

Strączek began the 2023–24 season as Bordeaux's first-choice goalkeeper. After a series of inconsistent performances, he was replaced in the starting line-up by Karl-Johan Johnsson in October 2023. Strączek returned to the team for several matches later in the year but spent the second half of the season as the Swedish goalkeeper's deputy. He finished the campaign with 16 league appearances.

Across his two seasons with Bordeaux, Strączek made 24 appearances in all competitions, including 19 in Ligue 2.

=== GKS Katowice ===
On 24 July 2024, Strączek returned to Poland and joined newly promoted Ekstraklasa club GKS Katowice on a permanent transfer. His initial contract was valid until 31 May 2025.

Strączek served as a substitute to Dawid Kudła during the 2024–25 season. He did not appear in the league but started twice in the Polish Cup. In June 2025, he signed a new contract covering the 2025–26 season.

He subsequently established himself as GKS' first-choice goalkeeper during the 2025–26 campaign. In March 2026, he helped the club reach the semi-finals of the Polish Cup by saving a penalty during a shoot-out victory over Widzew Łódź.

On 17 April 2026, having kept eight clean sheets in his first 19 league appearances of the season, Strączek signed a new three-year contract with GKS, extending his stay until June 2029. He ended the league campaign with 22 appearances and also played four Polish Cup matches.

Strączek dislocated his shoulder during the closing stages of GKS' final league match of the season against Pogoń Szczecin. He subsequently underwent surgery and was ruled out for several months.

== International career ==
Strączek made one appearance for the Poland under-18 team. On 10 October 2016, he started in a 3–2 friendly victory over Finland in Tampere.

== Career statistics ==
As of match played 23 May 2026

Appearances and goals by club, season and competition
Club	Season	League			National cup (Note: Includes Polish Cup, Coupe de France)		Europe		Other		Total	
Club	Season	Division	Apps	Goals	Apps	Goals	Apps	Goals	Apps	Goals	Apps	Goals
JKS 1909 Jarosław	2015–16	III liga, gr. H	10	0	—		—		—		10	0
JKS 1909 Jarosław	2016–17	III liga, gr. IV	15	0	1	0	—		—		16	0
JKS 1909 Jarosław	Total		25	0	1	0	—		—		26	0
Stal Mielec (loan)	2016–17	I liga	2	0	—		—		—		2	0
Stal Mielec	2017–18	I liga	2	0	0	0	—		—		2	0
Stal Mielec	2019–20	I liga	4	0	—		—		—		4	0
Stal Mielec	2020–21	Ekstraklasa	25	0	1	0	—		—		26	0
Stal Mielec	2021–22	Ekstraklasa	26	0	0	0	—		—		26	0
Stal Mielec	Total		59	0	1	0	—		—		60	0
Wólczanka Wólka P. (loan)	2018–19	III liga, gr. IV	11	0	—		—		—		11	0
Motor Lublin (loan)	2019–20	III liga, gr. IV	5	0	0	0	—		—		5	0
Bordeaux	2022–23	Ligue 2	3	0	3	0	—		—		6	0
Bordeaux	2023–24	Ligue 2	16	0	2	0	—		—		18	0
Bordeaux	Total		19	0	5	0	—		—		24	0
GKS Katowice	2024–25	Ekstraklasa	0	0	2	0	—		—		2	0
GKS Katowice	2025–26	Ekstraklasa	22	0	4	0	—		—		26	0
GKS Katowice	2026–27	Ekstraklasa	0	0	0	0	0	0	—		0	0
GKS Katowice	Total		22	0	6	0	0	0	—		28	0
Career total			141	0	13	0	0	0	0	0	154	0

== Honours ==
JKS 1909 Jarosław

- Polish Cup (Subcarpathia regionals): 2015–16
- Polish Cup (Jarosław regionals): 2015–16

Stal Mielec

- I liga: 2019–20

Individual

- Ekstraklasa Young Player of the Month: May 2021
