= KS Łomianki =

Polish football club

- Full name: Klub Sportowy Łomianki
- Founded: 1993; 33 years ago
- Ground: Fabryczna 48
- Capacity: 1,000
- Chairman: Adam Biliński
- Manager: Paweł Zacharski
- League: IV liga Masovia
- 2024–25: V liga Masovia I, 1st of 15 (promoted)
- Website: http://www.kslomianki.pl

KS Łomianki is a Polish football club based in Łomianki, Masovian Voivodeship. The club was founded in 1993. Participants of the 2001–02 Polish Cup.

== Polish Cup records ==
Season	Round	Opponent	Result
2001–02	First round	Ceramika Opoczno	1–6

== Notable coaches ==
- Marek Papszun, champion of Poland with Raków Częstochowa.

== Controversies ==
In August 2013, in the lower league match KS Łomianki versus Polonia Warsaw, hundreds of Legia Warsaw fans turned up and tried to attack the visiting fans, although they only clashed with police. KS Łomianki was later fined for failing to adequately secure the venue and poor organisation was cited.
