= Marek Papszun =

Polish football manager (born 1974)

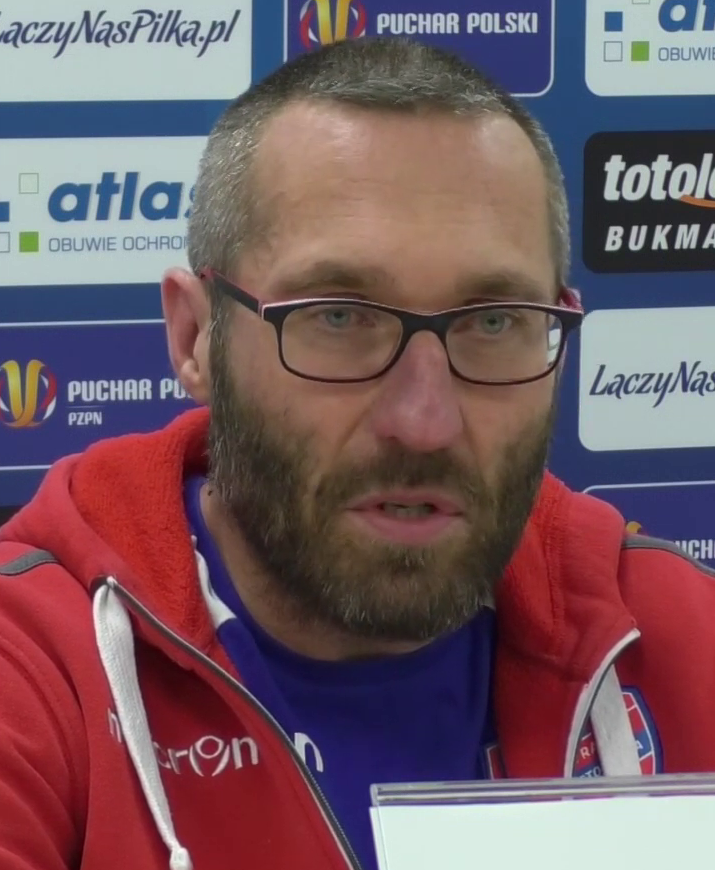
- Papszun with Raków Częstochowa in 2018

Personal information
- Date of birth: 8 August 1974 (age 52)
- Place of birth: Warsaw, Poland

Team information
- Current team: Legia Warsaw (manager)

Senior career*
Years	Team	Apps	(Gls)
- Wicher Kobyłka
- Polfa Tarchomin
- Białołęka Warsaw
- GKP Targówek
2014–2015	Wisła Zakroczym		

Managerial career
- Białołęka Warsaw
- 2006: Dolcan Ząbki
- 2009–2010: GKP Targówek
- 2010–2011: KS Łomianki
- 2011–2013: Legionovia Legionowo
- 2014: Legionovia Legionowo
- 2014–2016: Świt Nowy Dwór Mazowiecki
- 2016–2023: Raków Częstochowa
- 2024–2025: Raków Częstochowa
- 2025–: Legia Warsaw
- * Club domestic league appearances and goals

Marek Papszun (born 8 August 1974) is a Polish professional football manager and former player who is currently in charge of Ekstraklasa club Legia Warsaw.

== Managerial career ==
=== Early years ===
In 2010, Papszun took charge of Polish sixth division side KS Łomianki, and led them to winning their group and earning promotion to the IV liga in his first season at the club. In 2011, he was appointed manager of Legionovia Legionowo in the Polish fourth division, helping them achieve promotion to the Polish third division. On 18 April 2016, he was appointed manager of Polish third division club Raków Częstochowa. In his first three full seasons in charge, Raków won their division twice, and were promoted to the Polish Ekstraklasa at the end of the 2018–19 season. In the following months, he drew interest from fellow Ekstraklasa clubs Legia Warsaw and Lech Poznań.

=== Successful seasons ===
Raków led by Papszun won its first major trophy on 2 May 2021, defeating Arka Gdynia in the final of the Polish Cup by a score of 2–1. The win also secured them a place in the newly formed UEFA Europa Conference League for the 2021–22 season, their maiden appearance in European football. In the same season, Papszun's Raków finished in second place in the Ekstraklasa standings, club's highest ever league position. After the season, he was named the Ekstraklasa Coach of the Year. On 2 May 2022, Raków defeated Lech Poznań 3–1 and secured its second consecutive Polish Cup. On 9 July 2022, he led Raków to their second consecutive Polish Super Cup trophy with a 2–0 win over Lech Poznań. On 19 April 2023, with Raków eight points clear at the top and with six league games to go, as well as the Polish Cup final to be played, Papszun announced he would leave the team at the end of the season. Raków went on to secure their first-ever Ekstraklasa title.

=== Back to Raków ===
Following Raków Częstochowa's disappointing results in the 2023–24 campaign under Dawid Szwarga, the club decided to seek another coach. On 21 May 2024, four days before the final Ekstraklasa fixture, it was announced that Papszun would take over the team from the start of the 2024–25 season. He tied himself with a two–year contract, with the possibility of leaving in strictly defined situations. In his first season back in Częstochowa, he led Raków to a 2nd-place finish, one point behind Lech Poznań.

Raków's 2025–26 season started with them qualifying for the UEFA Conference League league phase. After the November 2025 international break, Papszun was again heavily linked with taking over Legia Warsaw. On 26 November, during a press conference ahead of a fixture against Rapid Wien, he responded to the rumours, saying "First things first: Legia wants me as their manager, and I want to be Legia's manager. That's all I have to comment to this matter. I hope we will reach an agreement, that it will happen, and I won't have to comment any further on the topic."

He led Raków for the final time on 18 December 2025, in a 2–0 away win over Cypriot club Omonia which secured a runner-up spot in the UEFA Conference League league phase for Raków.

=== Legia Warsaw ===
On 19 December 2025, Legia Warsaw announced the signing of Papszun as manager on a deal until the end of the 2027–28 season. At the time of his appointment, Legia were sitting 17th in the league table and had just failed to advance from the UEFA Conference League league phase. Legia's fortunes turned around under Papszun; he led them to eight wins, six draws and two losses as they finished the 2025–26 league season in sixth place, missing out on European competitions by one point.

== Personal life ==
He is married to Małgorzata, whom he married in 2019. He has a daughter.

== Managerial statistics ==
As of match played 22 November 2026

Managerial record by team and tenure
Team	From	To	Record							
Team	From	To	G	W	D	L	GF	GA	GD	Win %
GKP Targówek	1 July 2009	16 July 2010	38	29	4	5	100	33	+67	76.32
KS Łomianki	16 July 2010	9 November 2011	50	39	6	5	156	36	+120	78.00
Legionovia Legionowo	9 November 2011	13 December 2013	65	38	12	15	115	59	+56	58.46
Legionovia Legionowo	3 January 2014	30 June 2014	16	10	3	3	35	18	+17	62.50
Świt Nowy Dwór Mazowiecki	12 December 2014	17 April 2016	83	40	26	17	140	74	+66	48.19
Raków Częstochowa	18 April 2016	30 June 2023	288	163	68	57	471	262	+209	56.60
Raków Częstochowa	1 July 2024	19 December 2025	67	40	14	13	102	52	+50	59.70
Legia Warsaw	19 December 2025	Present	32	15	12	5	48	34	+14	46.88
Total			639	374	145	120	1,167	568	+599	58.53

== Honours ==
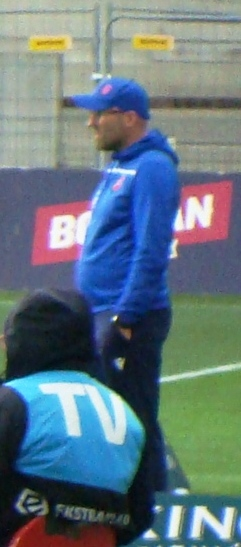
Papszun in 2021 managing Raków Częstochowa

=== Manager ===
KS Łomianki

- Regional league Warsaw II: 2010–11

Legionovia Legionowo

- III liga Łódź–Masovia: 2012–13

Świt Nowy Dwór Mazowiecki

- Polish Cup (Masovia regionals): 2015–16

Raków Częstochowa

- Ekstraklasa: 2022–23
- Polish Cup: 2020–21, 2021–22
- Polish Super Cup: 2021, 2022
- I liga: 2018–19
- II liga: 2016–17

Individual

- Polish Coach of the Year: 2020, 2021, 2022, 2023
- Ekstraklasa Coach of the Season: 2020–21, 2022–23
- I liga Coach of the Season: 2017–18, 2018–19
- II liga Coach of the Season: 2012–13, 2016–17
- Regional League Coach of the Season: 2010–11
- Ekstraklasa Coach of the Month: October 2020, April 2021, May 2021, February 2022, October 2022, November 2022, February 2023, March 2023, March 2025, November 2025, May 2026
