= Piotr Tworek =

Polish football manager

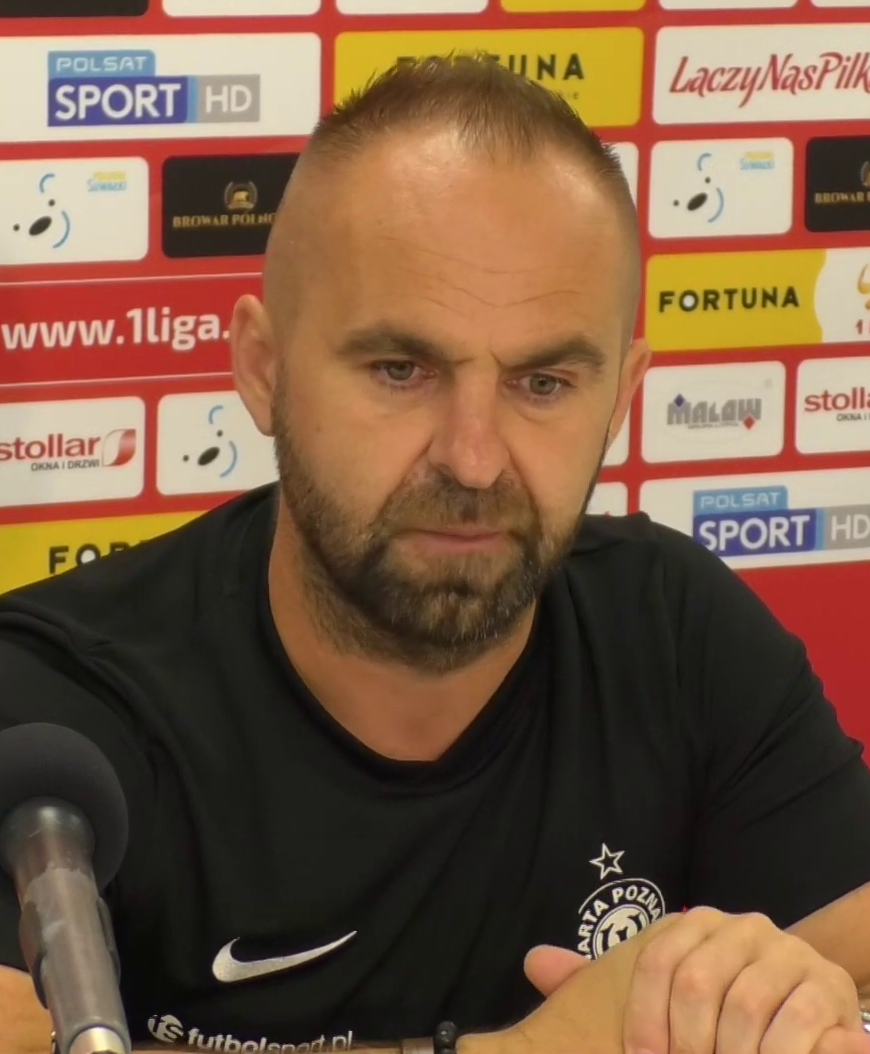
- Tworek in 2019 with Warta Poznań

Personal information
- Date of birth: 10 March 1975 (age 51)
- Place of birth: Piotrków Kujawski, Poland

Managerial career
- Years: Team
- 2007–2009: Zawisza Bydgoszcz
- 2009–2010: Wda Świecie
- 2012: Bałtyk Koszalin
- 2015–2016: Kotwica Kołobrzeg
- 2019–2021: Warta Poznań
- 2022: Śląsk Wrocław
- 2025: Kotwica Kołobrzeg
- 2025–2026: Rekord Bielsko-Biała

Piotr Tworek (born 10 March 1975) is a Polish professional football manager who was most recently in charge of II liga club Rekord Bielsko-Biała.

== Managerial career ==
He took over as Warta Poznań's manager in June 2019 with the stated mission of avoiding the club's relegation from I liga, the second tier of Polish football. To the surprise of many pundits, with Tworek in charge, Warta returned to the Ekstraklasa in 2020, after being absent for 25 years. In their first season back in the top tier, Tworek led Warta to a fifth-place finish, the club's best result since 1947.

However, Warta's next campaign in Ekstraklasa saw them struggling from the beginning, as they only managed one win and eight points in thirteen games. Due to this poor start, Tworek was dismissed on 2 November 2021.

On 9 March 2022, he was announced as the new manager of another Ekstraklasa side Śląsk Wrocław. With Tworek in charge, Śląsk managed one win and six draws in ten league games. Despite avoiding relegation, he was relieved of his duties on 25 May 2022.

On 13 January 2025, Tworek returned for a second stint as manager of I liga club Kotwica Kołobrzeg, taking over after Ryszard Tarasiewicz's departure. On 26 May 2025, Kotwica were relegated after a 1–2 loss to Bruk-Bet Termalica Nieciecza and Pogoń Siedlce's 2–1 win over Warta Poznań on the last matchday. Tworek was praised for keeping Kotwica's survival chances alive until the season's conclusion despite numerous issues within the club, including a transfer ban (lifted mid-March), needing to field a goalkeeper Kacper Krzepisz as an outfield substitute due to a shortage of players, months of unpaid wages and a lack of involvement from the club's chairman and main sponsor Adam Dzik. On 22 June 2025, Tworek was released from the club, along with the entire roster and coaching staff.

On 23 December 2025, Tworek was hired as the new head coach of II liga club Rekord Bielsko-Biała on a deal until the end of the season. With Tworek in charge, Rekord climbed from 15th to 9th in the league table at the end of the season and avoided relegation. On 16 November 2026, a day after their third defeat in a row, Rekord announced that they had mutually agreed to part ways with Tworek. He left with a record of twelve wins, seven draws and thirteen losses.

== Managerial statistics ==
As of match played 15 November 2026

Managerial record by team and tenure
Team	From	To	Record							
Team	From	To	G	W	D	L	GF	GA	GD	Win %
Zawisza Bydgoszcz	11 April 2007	14 March 2009	73	44	13	16	143	56	+87	60.27
Wda Świecie	6 July 2009	13 September 2010	39	21	5	13	74	50	+24	53.85
Bałtyk Koszalin	23 April 2012	30 June 2012	7	2	2	3	8	13	−5	28.57
Kotwica Kołobrzeg	6 May 2015	13 November 2016	60	19	19	22	70	73	−3	31.67
Warta Poznań	17 June 2019	2 November 2021	84	35	17	32	102	91	+11	41.67
Śląsk Wrocław	9 March 2022	25 May 2022	10	1	6	3	10	15	−5	10.00
Kotwica Kołobrzeg	13 January 2025	22 June 2025	15	2	6	7	14	22	−8	13.33
Rekord Bielsko-Biała	23 December 2025	16 November 2026	32	12	7	13	38	36	+2	37.50
Total			320	136	75	109	459	356	+103	42.50

== Honours ==
Zawisza Bydgoscz

- IV liga Kuyavia-Pomerania: 2007–08

Individual

- Ekstraklasa Coach of the Month: February 2021
