= Robert Kasperczyk =

Polish footballer and manager

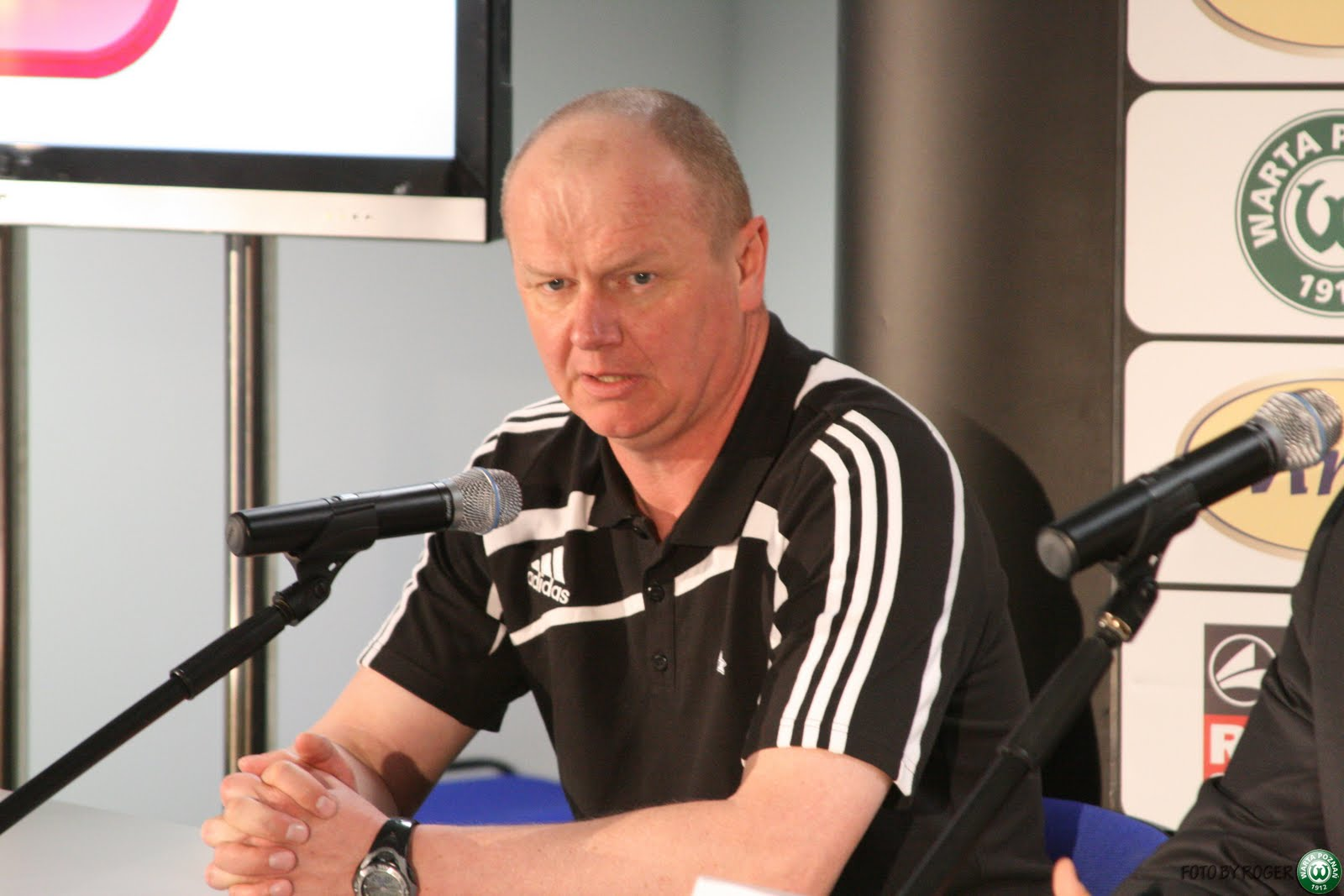

Personal information
- Date of birth: 22 January 1967 (age 59)
- Place of birth: Tuchów, Poland
- Height: 1.88 m (6 ft 2 in)
- Position: Forward

Youth career
- Hutnik Kraków

Senior career*
Years	Team	Apps	(Gls)
- Błękitni Kielce
1990–1992	Hutnik Kraków	29	(9)

Managerial career
- 2002–2006: Hutnik Kraków
- 2006–2009: Górnik Wieliczka
- 2009: KSZO Ostrowiec Świętokrzyski
- 2010–2012: Podbeskidzie Bielsko-Biała
- 2013: Stal Rzeszów
- 2013–2014: Motor Lublin
- 2014: Limanovia Limanowa
- 2015–2016: Sandecja Nowy Sącz
- 2020–2021: Podbeskidzie Bielsko-Biała
- 2024: Sandecja Nowy Sącz
- * Club domestic league appearances and goals

Robert Kasperczyk (born 22 January 1967) is a Polish professional football manager and former player who was most recently in charge of Sandecja Nowy Sącz.

He left Podbeskidzie Bielsko-Biała at the end of June 2021, after being relegated from 2020–21 Ekstraklasa and not having his contract extended. He served as head coach of the above-mentioned team from 22 December 2020.
