= Grzegorz Mokry =

Polish football manager (born 1985)

Personal information
- Full name: Grzegorz Mokry
- Date of birth: 19 January 1985 (age 41)
- Place of birth: Tarnowskie Góry, Poland

Managerial career
- Years: Team
- 2021: Miedź Legnica II
- 2021–2022: Wigry Suwałki
- 2022–2023: Miedź Legnica
- 2023: Podbeskidzie

Grzegorz Mokry (born 19 January 1985) is a Polish professional football manager who was most recently the assistant manager of Ekstraklasa club Cracovia.

== Managerial career ==
Mokry started his coaching career in 2011 as an assistant under Artur Skowronek at Ruch Radzionków. The two would continue to work together until 2015 at clubs such as Pogoń Szczecin, Polonia Bytom, Widzew Łódź and GKS Katowice. In 2015, he joined Dominik Nowak's staff at Wigry Suwałki and moved with him to Miedź Legnica in 2017. He was reunited with Skowronek in Wisła Kraków for a short period in 2020, taking over as an assistant coach after Dawid Szulczek was appointed manager of Wigry.

=== Miedź Legnica II ===
On 23 June 2021, he took on his first managerial role as Miedź Legnica II's head coach. He left on 8 November 2021, with the team placed third in their III liga group.

=== Wigry Suwałki ===
The following day, he was announced as the new manager of II liga side Wigry Suwałki, again as a replacement for Szulczek, who was set to join Warta Poznań. Wigry went on to have a successful campaign under Mokry, winning 11 games and drawing twice in 17 regular season games, finishing 4th. Much like the year before, Wigry would lose in the first round of I liga promotion play-offs, this time to Motor Lublin. Mokry left the club following the season's completion, as Wigry withdrew from II liga due to financial difficulties.

=== Miedź Legnica ===
After a short spell as an assistant under Dariusz Żuraw at Podbeskidzie Bielsko-Biała, Mokry returned to Miedź as their first team manager on 17 October 2022. At the time of his appointment, they were placed bottom of the Ekstraklasa table, with just six points after 12 games played. After achieving two wins in the first four games under Mokry, Miedź only managed to win once in 2023 before their relegation was confirmed with four games to go, following a 1–1 away draw against Cracovia on 1 May.

On 26 May 2023, the day before the last Ekstraklasa matchday, it was announced that Mokry would end his spell after the 2022–23 season.

=== Podbeskidzie ===
On 15 June 2023, Podbeskidzie announced Mokry returned to the club to become their manager until the end of the 2023–24 season, with an extension option for another year. Two wins and seven draws in fifteen league games left Podbeskidzie in the relegation zone, just two points ahead of Zagłębie Sosnowiec sitting at the bottom of the table, resulting in Mokry's dismissal on 15 November 2023.

=== Assistant at Legia ===
On 21 June 2024, Mokry joined the management staff of Ekstraklasa club Legia Warsaw as an assistant under head coach Gonçalo Feio. After Feio left the club, Mokry kept his role under Edward Iordănescu and caretaker head coach Iñaki Astiz. On 3 January 2026, a few weeks after the appointment of Marek Papszun, Mokry left Legia.

=== Assistant at Cracovia ===
Mokry was appointed assistant manager of Cracovia on 21 April 2026 under the newly appointed Bartosz Grzelak, replacing Dejan Kopasič. He left the club on 11 November 2026, shortly after Grzelak's sacking.

== Managerial statistics ==
As of match played 12 November 2023

Managerial record by team and tenure
Team	From	To	Record							
Team	From	To	G	W	D	L	GF	GA	GD	Win %
Miedź Legnica II	1 July 2021	8 November 2021	18	11	3	4	41	19	+22	61.11
Wigry Suwałki	15 November 2021	30 June 2022	18	11	2	5	39	24	+15	61.11
Miedź Legnica	17 October 2022	27 May 2023	22	3	8	11	21	33	−12	13.64
Podbeskidzie	15 June 2023	15 November 2023	17	3	7	7	14	22	−8	17.65
Total			75	28	20	27	115	98	+17	37.33
