= Jacek Magiera =

Polish football player and manager (1977–2026)

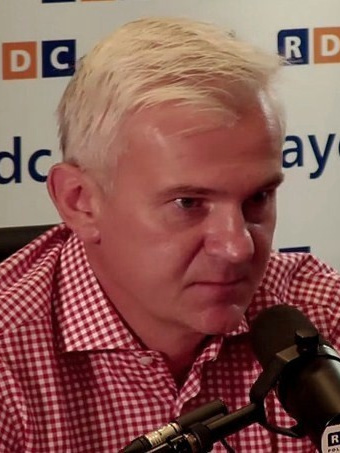
- Magiera in 2019

Personal information
- Date of birth: 30 December 1976 (actual); 1 January 1977 (administrative)
- Place of birth: Częstochowa, Polish People's Republic
- Date of death: 10 April 2026 (aged 49)
- Place of death: Wrocław, Poland
- Height: 1.85 m (6 ft 1 in)
- Positions: Centre-back; defensive midfielder

Youth career
- Raków Częstochowa

Senior career*
Years	Team	Apps	(Gls)
1991–1997	Raków Częstochowa	38	(8)
1997–2006	Legia Warsaw	176	(16)
2000–2001	→ Widzew Łódź (loan)	14	(1)
2006	→ Raków Częstochowa (loan)		
2006	Cracovia	5	(0)
Total		233	(25)

International career
1993	Poland U16		
- Poland U17

Managerial career
- 2014–2015: Legia Warsaw II
- 2016: Zagłębie Sosnowiec
- 2016–2017: Legia Warsaw
- 2018–2020: Poland U20
- 2020–2021: Poland U19
- 2021–2022: Śląsk Wrocław
- 2023–2024: Śląsk Wrocław
Medal record
Men's football
Representing Poland
UEFA European Under-16 Championship
Winner	1993 Turkey
- * Club domestic league appearances and goals

Jacek Magiera (30 December 1976/1 January 1977 – 10 April 2026) was a Polish professional football player and manager who played as a centre-back or defensive midfielder.

Magiera was best known for his stint with Legia Warsaw where he played from 1997 to 2006, with two loans in-between, winning the Ekstraklasa title, the Polish Cup, the Polish Super Cup and the Polish League Cup. He was a member of the Poland U16 team that won the 1993 UEFA European Under-16 Championship.

He coached several Polish sides and national youth teams. After returning to Legia as manager in 2016, he won one league title and managed them during their 2016–17 UEFA Champions League campaign.

== Club career ==
Magiera started his senior career at Raków Częstochowa in 1991, after having come through the academy. He played there for six seasons before he moved to Legia Warsaw in 1997. He debuted for them in an away win against GKS Bełchatów on 9 April 1997 under manager Władysław Stachurski.

At Legia, Magiera made 232 appearances throughout nine seasons. Under manager Franciszek Smuda, he lost his place in the starting lineup and was loaned out to Widzew Łódź in 2000, but regained his place in the Legia squad upon his return.

In 2006, he was loaned out to his former club Raków Częstochowa. This was somewhat of a surprise, as at the time Raków competed in the fourth tier, however he stated he wanted to help his boyhood local club; he stayed there for half a season.

On 19 July 2006, he signed for Cracovia, where he made five league appearances before retiring in December 2006.

== International career ==
In 1993, Magiera played for Poland under-16 and under-17 national teams. He won the 1993 UEFA European Under-16 Championship in Turkey with Poland U16. He also captained the under-17 side that finished fourth at the 1993 FIFA U-17 World Championship in Japan.

== Managerial career ==
=== Early years ===
On 20 December 2006, Magiera joined Legia's staff as an assistant coach, whilst simultaneously holding the same role with the Poland U18s. On 7 January 2014, Magiera took charge of Legia's reserve team and left his post on 7 June 2015 after his contract expired. His last match in charge was against Pogoń Grodzisk Mazowiecki, ending an 18-year association with the club at the time.

=== Zagłębie Sosnowiec ===
On 16 May 2016, Magiera became the head coach of I liga club Zagłębie Sosnowiec. He led the team in eleven games before leaving by mutual consent on 22 September that year.

=== Legia Warsaw ===
Two days after departing Zagłębie, Magiera was announced by Legia as their new manager, signing a two-year contract with an extension option. With Magiera in charge, Legia finished third in the 2016–17 UEFA Champions League group stage and secured a spot in the round of 32 of the UEFA Europa League.

On 4 June 2017, Magiera won his first silverware as manager, after Legia secured the 2016–17 league title. On 13 September, Magiera was dismissed after crashing out of the 2017–18 UEFA Champions League and UEFA Europa League qualifying rounds.

=== Poland youth teams ===
Magiera became the head coach of Poland U20 on 19 March 2018, and managed the team at the 2019 FIFA U-20 World Cup on home soil. On 20 June 2020, he took charge of the under-19 team until 11 March 2021.

=== Śląsk Wrocław ===
On 22 March 2021, Magiera took charge of Ekstraklasa side Śląsk Wrocław, a role he held until he was sacked on 8 March 2022. Since his contract with the club was still in effect, Śląsk re-appointed him as manager 13 months later, to replace the outgoing Ivan Đurđević on 21 April 2023. After avoiding relegation at the end of the season, his contract was extended for another two years.

Śląsk enjoyed a much more successful start to the 2023–24 campaign, occupying the top spot in the table from mid-September until the winter break and setting a new club record of seven straight Ekstraklasa wins. On 1 March 2024, Magiera penned a new deal, tying him with the club until mid-2026. Śląsk finished the season level on points with eventual champions Jagiellonia Białystok, losing the title on head-to-head goal difference.

After kicking off the following season with dropping out of the UEFA Conference League third qualifying round, Śląsk spent the majority of the league campaign in the relegation zone. On 12 November 2024, with the team placed 18th and last, with one win after 14 league games played, Magiera was relieved of his duties, and terminated his contract with the club days later.

=== Poland (assistant) ===
On 17 July 2025, Magiera was named the assistant manager of the Poland national team to newly appointed Jan Urban. He held this position until his death in April 2026.

== Personal life and death ==
Jacek Magiera was born on 30 December 1976 in Częstochowa. As his grandmother did not want him and his brother Marek (born 28 December 1974) to both be the youngest in their year groups in school, Jacek's date of birth was changed officially to 1 January 1977.

He completed a master's degree in history at the Jan Długosz Academy in Częstochowa. His master's dissertation was titled The historical and heraldic emblems on the basis of football clubs (Polish: Historyczna i heraldyczna emblematyka na podstawie klubów piłkarskich).

He was married to Magdalena and had two children: Małgorzata (born 2012) and Jan (born 2014). His brother Marek is a sports commentator.

Jacek Magiera was a practising Roman Catholic. After leading Śląsk to a runner-up spot in 2024, he went on pilgrimages to Medjugorje and Jasna Góra Monastery.

On 10 April 2026, Magiera was hospitalised at the Military Clinical Hospital in Wrocław after he fainted during a morning running workout. He was pronounced dead later that day.

His sudden death shocked the football community, and condolences were sent by many persons associated with football, as well as Ekstraklasa clubs, UEFA officials, and the president of Poland Karol Nawrocki. On the same day, the Polish Football Association announced a minute of silence would be held before all nationwide league matches played on 10–13 April 2026.

Magiera was buried at the Powązki Military Cemetery in Warsaw on 16 April. He was posthumously awarded the Order of Polonia Restituta, and inducted into the Ekstraklasa Hall of Fame.

== Managerial statistics ==
Managerial record by team and tenure
Team	From	To	Record							
Team	From	To	G	W	D	L	GF	GA	GD	Win %
Legia Warsaw II	7 January 2014	7 June 2015	51	23	11	17	90	72	+18	45.10
Zagłębie Sosnowiec	16 May 2016	22 September 2016	11	7	3	1	26	12	+14	63.64
Legia Warsaw	24 September 2016	13 September 2017	50	28	11	11	100	57	+43	56.00
Poland U20	19 March 2018	20 June 2020	18	6	2	10	26	27	−1	33.33
Poland U19	20 June 2020	11 March 2021	2	0	1	1	2	4	−2	0.00
Śląsk Wrocław	22 March 2021	8 March 2022	39	13	13	13	56	59	−3	33.33
Śląsk Wrocław	21 April 2023	12 November 2024	61	25	16	20	81	72	+9	40.98
Total			232	102	57	73	381	303	+78	43.97

== Honours ==
=== Player ===
Legia Warsaw

- Ekstraklasa: 2001–02
- Polish Cup: 1996–97
- Polish Super Cup: 1997
- Polish League Cup: 2001–02

Poland U16

- UEFA European Under-16 Championship: 1993

=== Manager ===
Legia Warsaw

- Ekstraklasa: 2016–17

=== Individual ===
- Ekstraklasa Hall of Fame: 2026
