= Bartosz Kieliba =

Polish footballer

Personal information
- Full name: Bartosz Kieliba
- Date of birth: 1 August 1990 (age 36)
- Place of birth: Krotoszyn, Poland
- Height: 1.88 m (6 ft 2 in)
- Position: Centre-back

Team information
- Current team: KKS 1925 Kalisz
- Number: 35

Youth career
- Jarota Jarocin

Senior career*
Years	Team	Apps	(Gls)
2008–2016	Jarota Jarocin	175	(10)
2016–2023	Warta Poznań	148	(10)
2023–	KKS 1925 Kalisz	77	(0)
- * Club domestic league appearances and goals as of 09:31, 31 May 2026 (UTC)

Bartosz Kieliba (born 1 August 1990) is a Polish professional footballer who plays as a centre-back for and captains III liga club KKS 1925 Kalisz.

== Honours ==
Warta Poznań

- III liga Kuyavia-Pomerania–Greater Poland: 2014–15, 2015–16
