= Krystian Getinger =

Polish footballer

Personal information
- Date of birth: 29 August 1988 (age 38)
- Place of birth: Mielec, Poland
- Height: 1.85 m (6 ft 1 in)
- Position: Left-back

Team information
- Current team: Stal Mielec
- Number: 23

Youth career
- –2005: Stal Mielec

Senior career*
Years	Team	Apps	(Gls)
2005–2007	Stal Mielec	33	(1+)
2008	Zagłębie Lubin II	13	(5)
2009–2010	Stal Mielec	40	(8)
2010–2013	Stal Stalowa Wola	71	(6)
2013–2025	Stal Mielec	361	(27)
2025–2026	Stal Stalowa Wola	25	(0)
2026–	Stal Mielec	0	(0)
- * Club domestic league appearances and goals as of 11:15, 31 May 2026 (UTC)

Krystian Getinger (born 29 August 1988) is a Polish professional footballer who plays as a left-back for I liga club Stal Mielec. He has made over 400 league appearances across 16 seasons for Stal, serving as the club's captain throughout most of the 2010s and 2020s.

== Career ==
In 2007, Getinger signed for Polish top flight side Zagłębie Lubin after playing for Stal Mielec in the Polish fourth division.

Before the second half of the 2008–09 season, he returned to Stal Mielec.

In 2010, he signed for Stal Stalowa Wola in the Polish third division.

In 2013, Getinger re-joined Stal Mielec again, helping them achieve promotion to the Polish top flight within seven seasons. In June 2025, it was announced his contract with Stal would not be extended.

On 7 July 2025, Getinger returned to third division Stal Stalowa Wola.

On 1 July 2026, he made his third return to Stal Mielec after signing a one-year contract.

== Honours ==
Stal Mielec

- I liga: 2019–20
- II liga: 2015–16
