= 2022–23 Piast Gliwice season =

Piast Gliwice
2022–23 season
- Chairman: Grzegorz Bednarski
- Manager: Aleksandar Vuković
- Stadium: Stadion Miejski im. Piotra Wieczorka
- Ekstraklasa: 5th
- Polish Cup: Round of 16
- Top goalscorer: League: Kamil Wilczek (9); All: Kamil Wilczek (9)
Home colours	Away colours	Third colours

The 2022–23 season was Piast Gliwice's 78th season in existence and the club's 11th consecutive season in the top flight of Polish football. In addition to the domestic league, Piast Gliwice participated in this season's edition of the Polish Cup. The season covers the period from 1 July 2022 to 30 June 2023.

== Players ==
=== First-team squad ===
As of 20 March 2023

Note: Flags indicate national team as defined under FIFA eligibility rules; some limited exceptions apply. Players may hold more than one non-FIFA nationality.

No.	Pos.	Nation	Player
2	DF	POL	Ariel Mosór
3	DF	ESP	Miguel Muñoz
4	DF	POL	Jakub Czerwiński
5	DF	SVK	Tomáš Huk
6	MF	POL	Michał Chrapek
7	MF	ESP	Jorge Félix
12	GK	POL	Bartłomiej Jelonek
14	DF	SVK	Jakub Holúbek
16	MF	POL	Patryk Dziczek
18	FW	POL	Kamil Wilczek
19	MF	POL	Michael Ameyaw
20	MF	POL	Grzegorz Tomasiewicz
22	DF	POL	Tomasz Mokwa
23	MF	POL	Szczepan Mucha
24	MF	ENG	Tom Hateley

No.	Pos.	Nation	Player
25	MF	POL	Piotr Liszewski
26	GK	SVK	František Plach
27	FW	POL	Gabriel Kirejczyk
28	MF	POL	Michał Kaput
30	MF	POL	Oskar Leśniak
33	GK	POL	Karol Szymański
34	FW	AUT	Alex Sobczyk
37	DF	AUT	Constantin Reiner
47	MF	POL	Bartosz Łuczak
67	MF	POL	Jakub Niedbała
77	MF	POL	Arkadiusz Pyrka
92	FW	POL	Damian Kądzior
96	MF	MKD	Tihomir Kostadinov
98	DF	GRE	Alexandros Katranis

=== Out on loan ===
Note: Flags indicate national team as defined under FIFA eligibility rules; some limited exceptions apply. Players may hold more than one non-FIFA nationality.

No.	Pos.	Nation	Player
9	FW	ESP	Alberto Toril (at Real Murcia until 30 June 2023)
11	FW	EST	Rauno Sappinen (at Stal Mielec until 30 June 2023)
—	MF	POL	Mateusz Winciersz (at Skra Częstochowa until 30 June 2023)

== Pre-season and friendlies ==
Win Draw Loss Fixtures

== Competitions ==
=== Overview ===
Competition	First match	Last match	Starting round	Final position	Record							
Competition	First match	Last match	Starting round	Final position	Pld	W	D	L	GF	GA	GD	Win %
Ekstraklasa	15 July 2022	27 May 2023	Matchday 1	5th	34	15	8	11	40	31	+9	44.12
Polish Cup	1 September 2022	8 November 2022	First round	Round of 16	3	2	0	1	5	2	+3	66.67
Total					37	17	8	12	45	33	+12	45.95

Source: Soccerway

=== Ekstraklasa ===
==== League table ====
Pos	Team	Pld	W	D	L	GF	GA	GD	Pts	Qualification or relegation
3	Lech Poznań	34	17	10	7	51	29	+22	61	Qualification for the Europa Conference League second qualifying round (Note: Since the winner of the 2022–23 Polish Cup qualified for the Europa Conference League based on league position, the third Europa Conference League second qualifying round berth was transferred to the 4th-placed team.)
4	Pogoń Szczecin	34	17	9	8	57	46	+11	60	Qualification for the Europa Conference League second qualifying round
5	Piast Gliwice	34	15	8	11	40	31	+9	53	
6	Górnik Zabrze	34	13	9	12	45	43	+2	48	
7	Cracovia	34	12	10	12	41	35	+6	46	

Source: ekstraklasa.org
Rules for classification: 1) Points; 2) Head-to-head points; 3) Head-to-head goal difference; 4) Goal difference; 5) Goals scored; 6) Number of wins; 7) Number of away wins; 8) Lower number of points based on yellow and red cards (red card = 3 points, yellow card = 1 point, sending-off = 3 points - including 1 point for first yellow card); 9) Fairplay ranking; 10) Draw. (Note: Head-to-head record is used only after all the matches between the teams in question have been played)

==== Results summary ====
Overall								Home						Away					
Pld	W	D	L	GF	GA	GD	Pts	W	D	L	GF	GA	GD	W	D	L	GF	GA	GD
34	14	8	12	37	32	+5	50	6	4	7	17	16	+1	8	4	5	20	16	+4

Source: PKO Ekstraklasa

==== Results by round ====
Round	1	2	3	4	5	6	7	8	9	10	11	12	13	14	15	16	17	18	19	20	21	22	23	24	25	26	27	28	29	30	31	32	33	34
Ground	A	H	H	A	A	H	A	H	A	H	A	H	A	H	A	H	A	H	A	A	H	H	A	H	A	H	A	H	A	H	A	H	A	H
Result	L	L	L	L	W	W	L	W	D	D	L	L	D	L	D	L	W	D	L	W	L	W	W	D	W	W	W	W	W	D	W	W	D	L
Position	17	17	18	18	16	14	16	14	15	15	15	16	15	16	16	16	16	16	16	15	16	15	13	14	10	8	8	6	6	6	5	5	5	5

Source: PKO Ekstraklasa
A = Away; H = Home; W = Win; D = Draw; L = Loss

==== Matches ====
The league fixtures were announced on 1 June 2022.

16 July 2022 1	Jagiellonia Białystok	2–0	Piast Gliwice	Białystok
17:30 CEST	Jesús Imaz 29' (yellow card) 70'; Pospíšil (yellow card) 73'; Marc Gual (yellow card) 75'; Țîru (yellow card) 86'; Mateusz Kowalski 90+4'	Report	Chrapek (yellow card) 18'; Huk (yellow card) 58'; Ameyaw (yellow card) 84'	Stadium: Stadion Miejski; Attendance: 8,236; Referee: (Poland) Daniel Stefański

29 July 2022 3	Piast Gliwice	0–1	Zagłębie Lubin	Gliwice
18:00 CEST	Reiner (yellow card) 45'; Alberto Torli (yellow card) 59'	Report	Ławniczak (yellow card) 11'; Łakomy (yellow card) 39'; Tornike Gaprindashvili 61' (red card) 64'; Bieszczad (yellow card) 86'	Stadium: Stadion Miejski im. Piotra Wieczorka; Attendance: 3,412; Referee: (Poland) Krzysztof Jakubik

5 August 2022 4	Legia Warsaw	2–0	Piast Gliwice	Warsaw
20:30 CEST	Rose (yellow card) 29'; Muçi 47'; Mladenović 51'; Baku (yellow card) 70'	Report	Wilczek (yellow card) 29'; Kaput (yellow card) 51'; Reiner (yellow card) 90+2'	Stadium: Stadion Wojska Polskiego; Attendance: 19,045; Referee: (Poland) Tomasz Musial

13 August 2022 5	Cracovia	0–1	Piast Gliwice	Kraków
15:00 CEST	Rakoczy (yellow card) 54'; Kakabadze (yellow card) 59'; Râpă (yellow card) 90+3'	Report	Katranis (yellow card) 59'; Jorge Félix 70'; Chrapek (yellow card) 74'	Stadium: Stadion Cracovii im. Józefa Piłsudskiego; Attendance: 7,654; Referee: (Poland) Paweł Raczkowski

21 August 2022 6	Piast Gliwice	4–0	Stal Mielec	Gliwice
17:30 CEST	Wilczek 23' 50' 55'; Chrapek (yellow card) 43'; Katranis (yellow card) 68'; Kądzior 73'	Report	Matras (yellow card) 69'; Kasperkiewicz (yellow card) 69'	Stadium: Stadion Miejski im. Piotra Wieczorka; Attendance: 3,550; Referee: (Poland) Szymon Marciniak

28 August 2022 7	Lech Poznań	1–0	Piast Gliwice	Poznań
17:30 CEST	Afonso Sousa 5' (yellow card) 7'; Joel Pereira (yellow card) 70'; Kvekveskiri (yellow card) 76'; Douglas (yellow card) 82'	Report	Katranis (yellow card) 11'; Tomasiewicz (yellow card) 72'; Czerwiński (yellow card) 76'; Ameyaw (yellow card) 90+3'	Stadium: Stadion Poznań; Attendance: 11,223; Referee: (Poland) Tomasz Kwiatkowski

5 September 2022 8	Piast Gliwice	2–1	Miedź Legnica	Gliwice
18:00 CEST	Reiner 42'; Czerwiński 66'; Tomasiewicz (yellow card) 89'	Report	Kobacki 19'	Stadium: Stadion Miejski im. Piotra Wieczorka; Attendance: 3,090; Referee: (Poland) Sebastian Krasny

10 September 2022 9	Górnik Zabrze	3–3	Piast Gliwice	Zabrze
20:00 CEST	Janža 17' (yellow card) 28'; Krawczyk 42' (pen.); Szcześniak (yellow card) 56'; Jensen 90+9'	Report	Jensen 5' (o.g.); Wilczek 14'; Reiner (yellow card) 31'; Katranis (yellow card) 41'; Kądzior 49' (yellow card) 81'; Mosór (red card) 90+8'; Alberto Toril (yellow card) 90+8'	Stadium: Stadion im. Ernesta Pohla; Attendance: 19,114; Referee: (Poland) Bartosz Frankowski

16 September 2022 10	Piast Gliwice	1–1	Śląsk Wrocław	Gliwice
18:00 CEST	Czerwiński (yellow card) 28'; Reiner 35'; Hateley (yellow card) 45+1'	Report	Olsen 29' (pen.)	Stadium: Stadion Miejski im. Piotra Wieczorka; Attendance: 3,253; Referee: (Poland) Wojciech Myć

30 September 2022 11	Wisła Płock	1–0	Piast Gliwice	Płock
20:30 CEST	Kolar 88'	Report	Tomasiewicz (yellow card) 25'; Reiner (yellow card) 90+2'; Plach (yellow card) 90+6'; Dziczek (yellow card) 90+6'	Stadium: Stadion im. Kazimierza Górskiego; Attendance: 4,203; Referee: (Poland) Daniel Stefański

6 October 2022 2	Piast Gliwice	0–1	Raków Częstochowa	Gliwice
20:45 CEST	Hateley (yellow card) 90+7'; Dziczek (yellow card) 90+12'	Report	Kocherhin (yellow card) 54'; Petrášek (yellow card) 57' (yellow-red card) 90+4'; Tudor 90+10'	Stadium: Stadion Miejski im. Piotra Wieczorka; Attendance: 3,017; Referee: (Poland) Krzysztof Jakubik

10 October 2022 12	Piast Gliwice	1–2	Widzew Łódź	Gliwice
20:30 CEST	Ameyaw 90'	Report	Jordi Sánchez 27'; Letniowski (yellow card) 41'; Hansen 82'	Stadium: Stadion Miejski im. Piotra Wieczorka; Attendance: 4,013; Referee: (Poland) Sebastian Krasny

15 October 2022 13	Pogoń Szczecin	1–1	Piast Gliwice	Szczecin
20:00 CEST	Stolarski (yellow card) 54'; Jean Carlos 59' (yellow card) 64'; Triantafyllopoulos (yellow card) 87'; Kowalczyk (yellow card) 90+2'; Luís Mata (yellow card) 90+3'	Report	Sappinen 16'; Chrapek (yellow card) 30'; Plach (yellow card) 64'; Dziczek (yellow card) 69'; Czerwiński (yellow card) 70'; Katranis (yellow card) 77'	Stadium: Stadion Miejski im. Floriana Krygiera; Attendance: 17,085; Referee: (Poland) Damian Sylwestrzak

24 October 2022 14	Piast Gliwice	1–2	Radomiak Radom	Gliwice
18:00 CEST	Tomasiewicz (yellow card) 26'; Ameyaw 36'; Dziczek (yellow card) 44'	Report	Luís Machado 32'; Roberto Alves 72'	Stadium: Stadion Miejski im. Piotra Wieczorka; Attendance: 2,721; Referee: (Poland) Jarosław Przybył

29 October 2022 15	Korona Kielce	1–1	Piast Gliwice	Kielce
15:00 CEST	Łukowski 16'; Danek (yellow card) 57'; Marcin Szpakowski (yellow card) 80'	Report	Kądzior (yellow card) 67'; Wilczek 77'	Stadium: Suzuki Arena; Attendance: 6,628; Referee: (Poland) Damian Kos

5 November 2022 16	Piast Gliwice	0–2	Warta Poznań	Gliwice
12:30 CET	Dziczek (yellow card) 50'; Miguel Muñoz (yellow card) 84'	Report	Miguel Luís 31'; Szymonowicz (yellow card) 53'; Stavropoulos 80'	Stadium: Stadion Miejski im. Piotra Wieczorka; Attendance: 4,235; Referee: (Poland) Krzysztof Jakubik

13 November 2022 17	Lechia Gdańsk	1–3	Piast Gliwice	Gdańsk
15:00 CET	Nalepa 86'	Report	Kuciak 43' (o.g.); Dziczek 63' (pen.); Chrapek (yellow card) 84' (goal) 90+7'	Stadium: Polsat Plus Arena Gdańsk; Attendance: 7,102; Referee: (Poland) Bartosz Frankowski

29 January 2023 18	Piast Gliwice	1–1	Jagiellonia Białystok	Gliwice
12:30 CET	Wilczek 68'	Report	Israel Puerto (yellow card) 11'; Romanczuk (yellow card) 44'; Wojciech Łaski 61'	Stadium: Stadion Miejski im. Piotra Wieczorka; Attendance: 3,328; Referee: (Poland) Jarosław Przybył

4 February 2023 19	Raków Częstochowa	1–0	Piast Gliwice	Częstochowa
15:00 CET	Czerwiński 40' (o.g.); Kocherhin (yellow card) 58'; Wdowiak (yellow card) 90+2'	Report	Hateley (yellow card) 43'; Dziczek (yellow card) 78'	Stadium: Miejski Stadion Piłkarski "Raków"; Attendance: 5,238; Referee: (Poland) Szymon Marciniak

12 February 2023 20	Zagłębie Lubin	0–2	Piast Gliwice	Lubin
12:30 CET	Bartłomiej Kłudka (yellow card) 46'; Łakomy (yellow card) 54'; Ławniczak (yellow card) 75'	Report	Kądzior 13'; Wilczek 38'	Stadium: Stadion Zagłębia Lubin; Attendance: 4,116; Referee: (Poland) Piotr Urban

19 February 2023 21	Piast Gliwice	0–1	Legia Warsaw	Gliwice
17:30 CET	Katranis (yellow card) 22'; Tomasiewicz (yellow card) 23'; Dziczek (yellow card) 37'; Czerwiński (yellow card) 45'; Chrapek (yellow card) 82'	Report	Pekhart (yellow card) 31'; Slisz (yellow card) 37' (yellow-red card) 84'; Jędrzejczyk (yellow card) 64'; Josué 76' (pen.)	Stadium: Stadion Miejski im. Piotra Wieczorka; Attendance: 5,753; Referee: (Poland) Damian Sylwestrzak

=== Polish Cup ===
1 September 2022 First Round	Lechia Dzierżoniów	1–2	Piast Gliwice	Pieszyce
16:30 CEST	Marcin Orłowski 90+1'	Report	Jorge Félix 41'; Pyrka 66'; Kądzior (yellow card) 80'	Stadium: Stadion Pieszyce; Attendance: 800; Referee: (Poland) Marcin Kochanek

18 October 2022 Round Of 32	Stal Mielec	0–3 (a.e.t.)	Piast Gliwice	Mielec
17:30 CEST	Wolski (yellow card) 71' (red card) 90+4'	Report	Dziczek (yellow card) 15'; Miguel Muñoz (yellow card) 66'; Pyrka (yellow card) 80'; Holúbek (yellow card) 94'; Gabriel Kirejczyk 99'; Katranis 105+1'; Hateley 112'	Stadium: Stadion Miejski (Mielec); Attendance: 5,780; Referee: (Poland) Daniel Stefański

8 November 2022 Round Of 16	Górnik Łęczna	1–0 (a.e.t.)	Piast Gliwice	Łęczna
17:30 CEST	Lykhovydko (yellow card) 76' (yellow-red card) 90'; Kryeziu 102'; Łukasz Szramowski (yellow card) 113'; Łukasz Grzeszczyk (yellow card) 117'	Report	Pyrka (yellow card) 31'; Dziczek (yellow card) 41' (yellow-red card) 120+1'; Katranis (yellow card) 98'; Chrapek (yellow card) 115'	Stadium: Stadion Górnika Łęczna; Attendance: 2,554; Referee: (Poland) Grzegorz Kawałko
