= 2024–25 Śląsk Wrocław season =

Śląsk Wrocław
2024–25 season
- Manager: Jacek Magiera
- Stadium: Wrocław Stadium
- Ekstraklasa: 16th
- Polish Cup: Round of 16
- UEFA Conference League: Third qualifying round
- Top goalscorer: League: Assad Al Hamlawi (6 goals); All: Assad Al Hamlawi (6 goals)
- Highest home attendance: 23,646 vs Lechia Gdańsk
- Lowest home attendance: 20,723 vs Riga
- Average home league attendance: 18,802
Home colours	Away colours	Third colours
- All statistics correct as of 4 May 2025.

The 2024–25 season is the 78th season in the history of Śląsk Wrocław, and the club's 17th consecutive season in Ekstraklasa. In addition to the domestic league, the team participated in the Polish Cup and the UEFA Conference League.

== Transfers ==
=== In ===
Pos.	Player	Transferred from	Fee	Date	Source
MF	(Poland) Łukasz Gerstenstein	(Poland) Stal Mielec	Loan return	30 June 2024	
DF	(Poland) Serafin Szota	(Poland) Widzew Łódź	Free	1 July 2024	
DF	(Bulgaria) Simeon Petrov	(Bulgaria) CSKA 1948	Undisclosed	1 July 2024	
MF	(Germany) Simon Schierack	(Germany) RB Leipzig U19	Free	1 July 2024	
FW	(Poland) Sebastian Musiolik	(Poland) Górnik Zabrze	Free	1 July 2024	
GK	(Poland) Tomasz Loska	(Poland) Bruk-Bet Termalica Nieciecza	Free	1 July 2024	
DF	(Ukraine) Oleksandr Havrylenko	(Germany) RB Leipzig U19	Free	16 July 2024	
FW	(Spain) Arnau Ortiz	(Spain) Girona	Free	18 July 2024	
MF	(Romania) Tudor Băluţă	(Romania) Farul Constanța	Free	19 July 2024	

=== Out ===
Pos.	Player	Transferred to	Fee	Date	Source
DF	(Poland) Patryk Janasik	(Poland) Cracovia	End of contract	1 July 2024	
MF	(Poland) Michał Rzuchowski	(Poland) Arka Gdynia	End of contract	1 July 2024	
GK	(Poland) Mateusz Górski	(Poland) GKS Tychy	End of contract	1 July 2024	
FW	(Spain) Erik Expósito		End of contract	1 July 2024	
DF	(Poland) Martin Konczkowski	(Poland) Ruch Chorzów	End of contract	1 July 2024	
GK	(Poland) Oskar Mielcarz	(Poland) Wieczysta Kraków	Loan	1 July 2024	
FW	(Poland) Jakub Lutostański	(Poland) Pogoń Siedlce	Undisclosed	12 July 2024	
DF	(Poland) Szymon Lewkot	(Poland) Chrobry Głogów	Contract terminated	17 July 2024	
FW	(Poland) Patryk Szwedzik	(Poland) Chrobry Głogów	Loan	17 July 2024	
FW	(Switzerland) Junior Eyamba		Contract terminated	2 December 2024	

== Friendlies ==
=== Pre-season ===
21 June 2024 Friendly	Brzeg Dolny (Poland)	0–4	(Poland) Śląsk Wrocław	Brzeg Dolny
14:00			Wołczek 18'; Żukowski 23'; Eyamba 27'; Gerstenstein 68'	Stadium: Stadion Miejski

26 June 2024 Friendly	Śląsk Wrocław (Poland)	v	(Romania) CS Universitatea Craiova	Austria

26 June 2024 Friendly	Śląsk Wrocław (Poland)	1–0	(Romania) CFR Cluj	Ottensheim, Austria
17:00	Jezierski 18'

29 June 2024 Friendly	Śląsk Wrocław (Poland)	v	(Armenia) FC Noah	Austria
Note: The match was cancelled.

3 July 2024 Friendly	Śląsk Wrocław (Poland)	0–2	(Czech Republic) Slavia Prague	Aigen-Schlägl, Austria
15:00			Diouf 24'; Botos 68'	Stadium: Pöschl Park UFC Aigen-Schlägl

6 July 2024 Friendly	SFC Opava (Czech Republic)	0–2	(Poland) Śląsk Wrocław	Opava, Czech Republic
16:00			Nahuel 38'; Musiolik 72'

12 July 2024 Friendly	Śląsk Wrocław (Poland)	1–1	(Czech Republic) Mladá Boleslav	Wrocław
17:30	Musiolik 22' (pen.)		Stránský 73'	Stadium: Oporowska Stadium

=== Mid-season ===
23 January 2025 Friendly	Minera (Spain)	0–7	(Poland) Śląsk Wrocław
11:00

== Competitions ==
=== Overall record ===
Competition	First match	Last match	Starting round	Final position	Record							
Competition	First match	Last match	Starting round	Final position	Pld	W	D	L	GF	GA	GD	Win %
Ekstraklasa	19 July 2024		Matchday 1		28	5	10	13	33	43	−10	17.86
Polish Cup	29 October 2024	3 December 2024	Round of 32	Round of 16	2	1	1	0	4	1	+3	50.00
UEFA Conference League	24 July 2024	15 August 2024	Second qualifying round	Third qualifying round	4	2	0	2	6	6	+0	50.00
Total					34	8	11	15	43	50	−7	23.53

Last updated: 12 April 2025
Source: Soccerway

=== Ekstraklasa ===
==== League table ====
Pos	Team	Pld	W	D	L	GF	GA	GD	Pts	Qualification or relegation
14	Lechia Gdańsk	34	10	7	17	44	59	−15	37	
15	Zagłębie Lubin	34	10	6	18	33	51	−18	36	
16	Stal Mielec (R)	34	7	10	17	39	56	−17	31	Relegation to I liga
17	Śląsk Wrocław (R)	34	6	12	16	38	53	−15	30	Relegation to I liga
18	Puszcza Niepołomice (R)	34	6	10	18	37	63	−26	28	Relegation to I liga

Source: ekstraklasa.org 90minut.pl
Rules for classification: 1) Points; 2) Head-to-head points; 3) Head-to-head goal difference; 4) Goal difference; 5) Goals scored; 6) Number of wins; 7) Number of away wins; 8) Lower number of points based on yellow and red cards (red card = 3 points, yellow card = 1 point, sending-off = 3 points - including 1 point for first yellow card); 9) Fairplay ranking; 10) Draw.
(Note: Head-to-head record is used only after all the matches between the teams in question have been played)
(R) Relegated

==== Results summary ====
Overall								Home						Away					
Pld	W	D	L	GF	GA	GD	Pts	W	D	L	GF	GA	GD	W	D	L	GF	GA	GD
28	5	10	13	33	43	−10	25	3	6	5	17	18	−1	2	4	8	16	25	−9

Last updated: 12 April 2025.
Source: Worldfootball

==== Results by round ====
Round	1	2	3	4	5	6	7	8	9	10	11	12	13	14	15	16	17	18	19	20	21	22	23	24	25	26	27	28
Ground	H	A	H	A	H	H	A	H	A	A	H	A	H	A	H	A	H	A	H	A	H	A	A	H	A	H	H	A
Result	D	L	L	D	D	D	L	W	L	L	L	D	D	L	L	D	L	L	L	D	W	L	L	D	W	W	D	W
Position	7	16	15	15	16	17	17	17	17	18	18	18	18	18	18	18	18	18	18	18	18	18	18	17	17	16	16	16

Updated to match(es) played on 12 April 2025. Source: Worldfootball
A = Away; H = Home; W = Win; D = Draw; L = Loss

==== Matches ====
The match schedule was released on 6 June 2024.

19 July 2024 1	Śląsk Wrocław	1–1	Lechia Gdańsk	Wrocław
20:30	Jezierski (yellow card) 8'; Szota (yellow card) 66'; Guercio 90+2'; Petrov (yellow card) 90+4'		Neugebauer 12', (yellow card) 47'	Stadium: Wrocław Stadium; Attendance: 23,646; Referee: Patryk Gryckiewicz

28 July 2024 2	Piast Gliwice	2–0	Śląsk Wrocław	Gliwice
17:30 UTC+2	Ameyaw 8'; Pyrka 45+3'			Stadium: Piotr Wieczorek Stadium; Referee: Paweł Raczkowski

11 August 2024 4	Widzew Łódź	0–0	Śląsk Wrocław	Łódź
20:15				Stadium: Widzew Łódź Stadium

18 August 2024 5	Śląsk Wrocław	1–1	Korona Kielce	Wrocław
14:45				Stadium: Wrocław Stadium

22 September 2024 9	Lech Poznań	1–0	Śląsk Wrocław	Poznań
17:30				Stadium: Poznań Stadium; Attendance: 34,285

28 September 2024 10	Motor Lublin	2–1	Śląsk Wrocław	Lublin
17:30				Stadium: Arena Lublin

6 October 2024 11	Śląsk Wrocław	v	Cracovia	Wrocław
14:45				Stadium: Wrocław Stadium

TBD 3	Śląsk Wrocław	v	Radomiak Radom	Wrocław
17:30				Stadium: Wrocław Stadium
Note: The match, originally scheduled for 4 August 2024, was postponed due to the participation of Śląsk Wrocław in the UEFA Conference League.

=== Polish Cup ===
29 October 2024 Round of 32	Radomiak Radom	0–3	Śląsk Wrocław	Radom
21:00 CET (UTC+01:00)		Report	Paluszek 45', 61'; Musiolik 74'	Stadium: Czachor Brothers Stadium; Referee: Daniel Stefański (Bydgoszcz)

3 December 2024 Round of 16	Śląsk Wrocław	1–1 (a.e.t.) (7–8 p)	Piast Gliwice	Wrocław
15:00 CET (UTC+01:00)	Samiec-Talar 86'	Report	Muñoz 25'	Stadium: Tarczyński Arena; Referee: Patryk Gryckiewicz (Toruń)
	Penalties
	Pokorný (penalty scored); Petkov (penalty scored); Żukowski (penalty scored); Băluță (penalty missed); Musiolik (penalty scored); Sharabura (penalty scored); Paluszek (penalty scored); Guercio (penalty scored); Gerstenstein (penalty missed)		(penalty scored) Katsantonis; (penalty missed) Szczepański; (penalty scored) Karbowy; (penalty scored) Mokwa; (penalty scored) Szymański; (penalty scored) Rosołek; (penalty scored) Muñoz; (penalty scored) Drapiński; (penalty scored) Czerwiński

=== UEFA Conference League ===
==== Second qualifying round ====
The draw was held on 19 June 2024.

24 July 2024 First leg	Riga FC (Latvia)	1–0	(Poland) Śląsk Wrocław	Riga, Latvia
19:00 UTC+3	Niang 7', (yellow card) 88'; Reginaldo Ramires (yellow card) 69'		Petrov (yellow card) 22'; Pokorný (yellow card) 41'; Rejczyk (yellow card) 74'	Stadium: Skonto Stadium; Attendance: 6,013; Referee: Christian-Petru Ciochirca (Austria)

1 August 2024 Second leg	Śląsk Wrocław (Poland)	3–1 (3–2 agg.)	(Latvia) Riga FC	Wrocław
20:30 UTC+2	Nahuel 6' (pen.), 52'; Petrov 49'		Babec 33'; Orosco (red card) 61'	Stadium: Wrocław Stadium; Attendance: 20,723; Referee: Genc Nuza (Kosovo)

==== Third qualifying round ====
The draw was held on 22 July 2024.

7 August 2024 First leg	St. Gallen (Switzerland)	2–0	(Poland) Śląsk Wrocław	St. Gallen, Switzerland
20:30	Akolo 5'; Geubbels 40'	Report		Stadium: Kybunpark; Referee: Jan Petrik (Czech Republic)

15 August 2024 Second leg	Śląsk Wrocław (Poland)	3–2 (3–4 agg.)	(Switzerland) St. Gallen	Wrocław
20:30		Report		Stadium: Wrocław Stadium
