= 2024–25 Piast Gliwice season =

Piast Gliwice
2024–25 season
- Manager: Aleksandar Vuković
- Stadium: Piotr Wieczorek Stadium
- Ekstraklasa: 10th
- Polish Cup: Quarter-final
Home colours	Away colours	Third colours

The 2024–25 season is the 80th season in the history of Piast Gliwice, and the club's 17th consecutive season in Ekstraklasa. In addition to the domestic league, the team is scheduled to participate in the Polish Cup.

== Transfers ==
=== In ===
Pos.	Player	Transferred from	Fee	Date	Source
DF	(Austria) Constantin Reiner	(Austria) Rheindorf Altach	Loan return	30 June 2024	
MF	(Poland) Michał Kaput	(Poland) Radomiak Radom	Loan return	30 June 2024	
DF	(Poland) Igor Drapiński	(Poland) Wisła Płock	Free	1 July 2024	
FW	(Poland) Maciej Rosołek	(Poland) Legia Warsaw	Undisclosed	25 July 2024	
FW	(Slovakia) Erik Jirka	(Czech Republic) Viktoria Plzeň	Undisclosed	1 January 2025	

=== Out ===
Pos.	Player	Transferred to	Fee	Date	Source
MF	(England) Tom Hateley		Retired	1 July 2024	
MF	(Georgia (country)) Valerian Gvilia		End of contract	1 July 2024	
DF	(Slovakia) Jakub Holúbek	(Slovakia) AS Trenčín	End of contract	1 July 2024	

== Friendlies ==
=== Pre-season ===
22 June 2024 Friendly	Polonia Bytom (Poland)	1–2	(Poland) Piast Gliwice	Bytom
11:00	Wojtyra 23'		Félix 49'; Kaput 81'	Stadium: Edward Szymkowiak Stadium

26 June 2024 Friendly	Pogoń Szczecin (Poland)	0–1	(Poland) Piast Gliwice	Opalenica
18:05			Huk 41'	Stadium: Hotel Remes Sport & Spa

29 June 2024 Friendly	Piast Gliwice (Poland)	1–0	(Poland) Lech Poznań	Opalenica
18:00	Félix 76' (pen.)	Report		Stadium: Stadion Miejski

30 June 2024 Friendly	Kotwica Kołobrzeg (Poland)	1–3	(Poland) Piast Gliwice	Opalenica
11:00	Stasiak 83' (pen.)	Report	Kądzior 43', 55'; Liszewski 90+1'

4 July 2024 Friendly	Piast Gliwice (Poland)	2–1	(Czech Republic) Karviná	Gliwice
11:00	Félix (penalty missed) 33', 34' (pen.); Kądzior 67'		Ezeh 26'	Stadium: Piotr Wieczorek Stadium
Note: Behind closed doors

13 July 2024 Friendly	Piast Gliwice (Poland)	3–0	(Poland) Korona Kielce	Gliwice
17:00	Ameyaw 77'; Pięczek 90' (o.g.); Piasecki 110' (pen.)			Stadium: Piotr Wieczorek Stadium
Note: Three periods of 45 minutes

22 July 2024 Friendly	Piast Gliwice (Poland)	2–1	(Poland) ŁKS Łódź	Gliwice
12:25	Karbowy 45'; Kądzior 68'		Zając 77'

=== Mid-season ===
12 January 2025 Friendly	Piast Gliwice (Poland)	0–2	(Czech Republic) Viktoria Plzeň
15:00

== Competitions ==
=== Ekstraklasa ===
==== League table ====
Pos	Team	Pld	W	D	L	GF	GA	GD	Pts
8	GKS Katowice	34	14	7	13	49	47	+2	49 (Note: Ranked based on head-to-head points: Motor Lublin 4 pts, GKS Katowice - 1 pt.)
9	Górnik Zabrze	34	13	8	13	43	39	+4	47
10	Piast Gliwice	34	11	12	11	37	36	+1	45 (Note: Ranked based on head-to-head points: Piast Gliwice 4 pts, Korona Kielce - 1 pt.)
11	Korona Kielce	34	11	12	11	37	45	−8	45
12	Radomiak Radom	34	11	8	15	48	52	−4	41

Source: ekstraklasa.org 90minut.pl
Rules for classification: 1) Points; 2) Head-to-head points; 3) Head-to-head goal difference; 4) Goal difference; 5) Goals scored; 6) Number of wins; 7) Number of away wins; 8) Lower number of points based on yellow and red cards (red card = 3 points, yellow card = 1 point, sending-off = 3 points - including 1 point for first yellow card); 9) Fairplay ranking; 10) Draw.
(Note: Head-to-head record is used only after all the matches between the teams in question have been played)

==== Matches ====
Ekstraklasa match details
Date	Time	Opponent	Venue	Result F–A	Scorers	Attendance	Ref.
21 July 2024	14:45	KS Cracovia	A	1–1	Félix 18'	10,698	
28 July 2024	17:30	Śląsk Wrocław	H	2–0	Ameyaw 8', Pyrka 45+3'	5,748	
4 August 2024	20:15	Legia Warsaw	A	2–1	Chrapek 20', Kostadinov 85'	24,633	
12 August 2024	19:00	GKS Katowice	H	2–2	Ameyaw 31', Chrapek 49'	7,805	
19 August 2024	19:00	Stal Mielec	A	0–2		4,308	
24 August 2024	20:15	Zagłębie Lubin	H	1–0	Kądzior 45'	4,516	
30 August 2024	18:00	Raków Częstochowa	A	1–0	Ameyaw 90+8'	5,454	
15 September 2024	12:15	Puszcza Niepołomice	H	1–1	Chrapek 71' pen.	5,779	
21 September 2024	17:30	Widzew Łódź	A	0–1		16,922	
29 September 2024	17:30	Jagiellonia Białystok	H	0–1		5,128	
6 October 2024	17:30	Pogoń Szczecin	A	0–1		19,148	
18 October 2024	18:00	Korona Kielce	A	2–0	Félix 16' pen., Rosołek 49'	8,735	
25 October 2024	18:00	Lechia Gdańsk	H	3–3	Félix 43', 66', Rosołek 81'	4,670	
3 November 2024	12:15	Radomiak Radom	A	1–1	Czerwiński 61'	6,002	
8 November 2024	18:00	Motor Lublin	H	2–3	Szczepański 36', Piasecki 70'	4,311	
24 November 2024	17:30	Górnik Zabrze	A	0–1		18,270	
29 November 2024	20:30	Lech Poznań	H	0–0		5,324	
8 December 2024	12:15	KS Cracovia	H	0–0		4,650	
3 February 2025	19:00	Śląsk Wrocław	A	3–1	Félix 14', Matsenko 25' o.g., Katsantonis 85'	9,744	
8 February 2025	20:15	Legia Warsaw	H	1–0	Félix 40'	8,304	
16 February 2025	14:45	GKS Katowice	A	0–0		6,753	
21 February 2025	18:00	Stal Mielec	H	2–2	Félix 59', Chrapek 71'	3,634	
1 March 2025	20:15	Zagłębie Lubin	A	1–0	Rosołek 8'	2,834	
8 March 2025	17:30	Raków Częstochowa	H	0–3		6,349	
16 March 2025	12:15	Puszcza Niepołomice	A	1–2	Szczepański 54'	2,000	
28 March 2025	18:00	Widzew Łódź	H	0–2		6,363	
6 April 2025	12:15	Jagiellonia Białystok	A	1–1	Gale 62'	17,440	
13 April 2025	14:45	Pogoń Szczecin	H	2–1	Kostadinov 26', Chrapek 51'	5,729	
19 April 2025	12:15	Korona Kielce	H	1–1	Mokwa 90+1'	4,620	
26 April 2025	14:45	Lechia Gdańsk	A	1–3	Weirauch 54' o.g.	9,434	
4 May 2025	12:15	Radomiak Radom	H	0–0		4,045	
9 May 2025	18:00	Motor Lublin	A	4–1	Huk 28', 31' pen., Chrapek 59', Rosołek 68'	13,344	
17 May 2025	17:30	Górnik Zabrze	H	2–0	Huk 22', Czerwiński 73'	9,361	
24 May 2025	17:30	Lech Poznań	A	0–1		41,109	

=== Polish Cup ===
Polish Cup match details
Round	Date	Time	Opponent	Venue	Result F–A	Scorers	Attendance	Ref.
First round	25 September 2024	14:30	Hutnik Kraków	A	3–3 (a.e.t.) (5–3 p)	Piasecki 7', Kostadinov 40', Félix 110' pen.	557	
Second round	30 October 2024	20:30	Arka Gdynia	A	3–1 (a.e.t.)	Rosołek 60', Szczepański 113', Piasecki 118' pen.	4,786	
Round of 16	3 December 2024	15:00	Śląsk Wrocław	A	1–1 (a.e.t.) (8–7 p)	Muñoz 25'	4,459	
Quarter-final	26 February 2025	18:00	Pogoń Szczecin	A	0–2 (a.e.t.)		15,942	
