= 2026–27 Piast Gliwice season =

Piast Gliwice
2026–27 season
- Stadium: Piotr Wieczorek Municipal Stadium
- Ekstraklasa: Pre-season
- Polish Cup: Pre-season
Home colours	Away colours

The 2026–27 season is the 82nd season in the history of GKS Piast Gliwice and their 15th consecutive season in the Ekstraklasa. The club will also compete in the Polish Cup.

== Transfers ==
=== In ===
Pos.	Player	Transferred from	Fee	Date	Source
GK	(Slovenia) Domen Gril	(Portugal) Académico de Viseu	Free	1 July 2026	
MF	(Poland) Jakub Łabojko	(Poland) Motor Lublin	Free	1 July 2026	

=== Out ===
Pos.	Player	Transferred to	Fee	Date	Source
MF	(Poland) Michał Chrapek	(Poland) Ruch Chorzów	Free	1 July 2026	
MF	(Poland) Patryk Dziczek	(Poland) Pogoń Szczecin		1 July 2026	
MF	(Poland) Grzegorz Tomasiewicz	(Poland) Śląsk Wrocław	Free	1 July 2026	

== Pre-season and friendlies ==
27 June 2026 Friendly	Raków Częstochowa (Poland)	2–0	(Poland) Piast Gliwice
11:00	Braut Brunes 12'; Pawłowski 54'

1 July 2026 Friendly	Piast Gliwice (Poland)	1–0	(Poland) GKS Katowice
10:15	Lokilo 44'

4 July 2026 Friendly	Piast Gliwice (Poland)	1–0	(Czech Republic) Baník Ostrava
17:00	Kucharski 55'

8 July 2026 Friendly	Piast Gliwice (Poland)	2–2	(Poland) Miedź Legnica
12:00

17 July 2026 Friendly	Piast Gliwice (Poland)	v	(Poland) Polonia Bytom

18 July 2026 Friendly	Piast Gliwice (Poland)	0–2	(Poland) Odra Opole
16:00

== Competitions ==
=== Overall record ===
Competition	First match	Last match	Starting round	Record							
Competition	First match	Last match	Starting round	Pld	W	D	L	GF	GA	GD	Win %
Ekstraklasa	27 July 2026		Matchday 1	1	0	0	1	0	2	−2	0.00
Polish Cup				0	0	0	0	0	0	+0	—
Total				1	0	0	1	0	2	−2	0.00

Source: Competitions

=== Ekstraklasa ===
Pos	Team	Pld	W	D	L	GF	GA	GD	Pts	Qualification or relegation
14	GKS Katowice	3	1	0	2	4	4	0	3	
15	Wieczysta Kraków	3	1	0	2	6	7	−1	3	
16	Piast Gliwice	4	1	0	3	7	12	−5	3	Relegation to I liga
17	Radomiak Radom	4	1	0	3	4	12	−8	3	Relegation to I liga
18	Raków Częstochowa	3	0	0	3	3	6	−3	0	Relegation to I liga

Updated to match(es) played on 16 August 2026. Source: ekstraklasa.org 90minut.pl
Rules for classification: 1) Points; 2) Head-to-head points; 3) Head-to-head goal difference; 4) Goal difference; 5) Goals scored; 6) Number of wins; 7) Number of away wins; 8) Lower number of points based on yellow and red cards (red card = 3 points, yellow card = 1 point, sending-off = 3 points - including 1 point for first yellow card); 9) Fairplay ranking; 10) Draw.
(Note: Head-to-head record is used only after all the matches between the teams in question have been played)

==== Matches ====
27 July 2026 1	Zagłębie Lubin	2–0	Piast Gliwice	Lubin
19:00	Sypek 72'; Regula 86'
