= Ariel Mosór =

Polish footballer (born 2003)

Personal information
- Full name: Ariel Paweł Mosór
- Date of birth: 19 February 2003 (age 23)
- Place of birth: Katowice, Poland
- Height: 1.84 m (6 ft 0 in)
- Position: Centre-back

Team information
- Current team: Korona Kielce
- Number: 2

Youth career
- –2018: Unia Warsaw
- 2018–2019: Legia Warsaw

Senior career*
Years	Team	Apps	(Gls)
2018	Unia Warsaw	3	(0)
2019–2021	Legia Warsaw II	34	(2)
2020	Legia Warsaw	2	(0)
2021–2024	Piast Gliwice	90	(2)
2024–2026	Raków Częstochowa	22	(1)
2026–	Korona Kielce	0	(0)

International career
2017–2018	Poland U15	5	(0)
2018–2019	Poland U16	11	(0)
2019–2020	Poland U17	9	(3)
2020–2021	Poland U19	6	(0)
2022–2025	Poland U21	25	(3)
- * Club domestic league appearances and goals as of 18:59, 29 May 2026 (UTC)

Ariel Paweł Mosór (born 19 February 2003) is a Polish professional footballer who plays as a centre-back for Ekstraklasa club Korona Kielce.

== Club career ==
Born in Katowice, Mosór went through the ranks of Unia Warsaw, before joining Legia Warsaw in 2018. He played his first professional match on 15 July 2020, during an Ekstraklasa goalless away draw against Lechia Gdańsk. He made one more league appearance during the 2019–20 season and received a gold medal following its conclusion, as Legia were crowned champions.

On 9 June 2021, Piast Gliwice announced the signing of Mosór on a three-year deal, with the option to extend the contract for another 12 months. On 12 January 2024, Piast announced they have exercised said extension clause.

On 23 August 2024, Mosór signed a four-year deal with fellow Ekstraklasa club Raków Częstochowa.

On 5 July 2026, Mosór moved to Korona Kielce on a four-year contract for an undisclosed fee.

== Personal life ==
His father, Piotr Mosór, was also a professional football player.

== Career statistics ==
As of match played 23 May 2026

Appearances and goals by club, season and competition
Club	Season	League			Polish Cup		Europe		Other		Total	
Club	Season	Division	Apps	Goals	Apps	Goals	Apps	Goals	Apps	Goals	Apps	Goals
Unia Warsaw	2017–18	Reg. league Warsaw I	3	0	—		—		—		3	0
Legia Warsaw II	2018–19	III liga, gr. I	1	0	—		—		—		1	0
Legia Warsaw II	2019–20	III liga, gr. I	14	0	2	0	—		—		16	0
Legia Warsaw II	2020–21	III liga, gr. I	19	2	—		—		—		19	2
Legia Warsaw II	Total		34	2	2	0	—		—		36	2
Legia Warsaw	2019–20	Ekstraklasa	2	0	—		—		—		2	0
Piast Gliwice	2021–22	Ekstraklasa	29	1	2	0	—		—		31	1
Piast Gliwice	2022–23	Ekstraklasa	28	0	0	0	—		—		28	0
Piast Gliwice	2023–24	Ekstraklasa	28	1	5	2	—		—		33	3
Piast Gliwice	2024–25	Ekstraklasa	5	0	—		—		—		5	0
Piast Gliwice	Total		90	2	7	2	—		—		97	2
Raków Częstochowa	2024–25	Ekstraklasa	11	1	1	0	—		—		12	1
Raków Częstochowa	2025–26	Ekstraklasa	11	0	1	1	2 (Note: Appearances in UEFA Conference League)	0	—		14	1
Raków Częstochowa	Total		22	1	2	1	2	0	—		26	2
Korona Kielce	2026–27	Ekstraklasa	0	0	0	0	—		—		0	0
Career total			151	5	11	3	2	0	0	0	164	8

== Honours ==
Legia Warsaw

- Ekstraklasa: 2019–20

Individual

- Ekstraklasa Young Player of the Season: 2022–23
- Ekstraklasa Young Player of the Month: March 2022, April 2023 December 2023
