= František Plach =

Slovak footballer (born 1992)

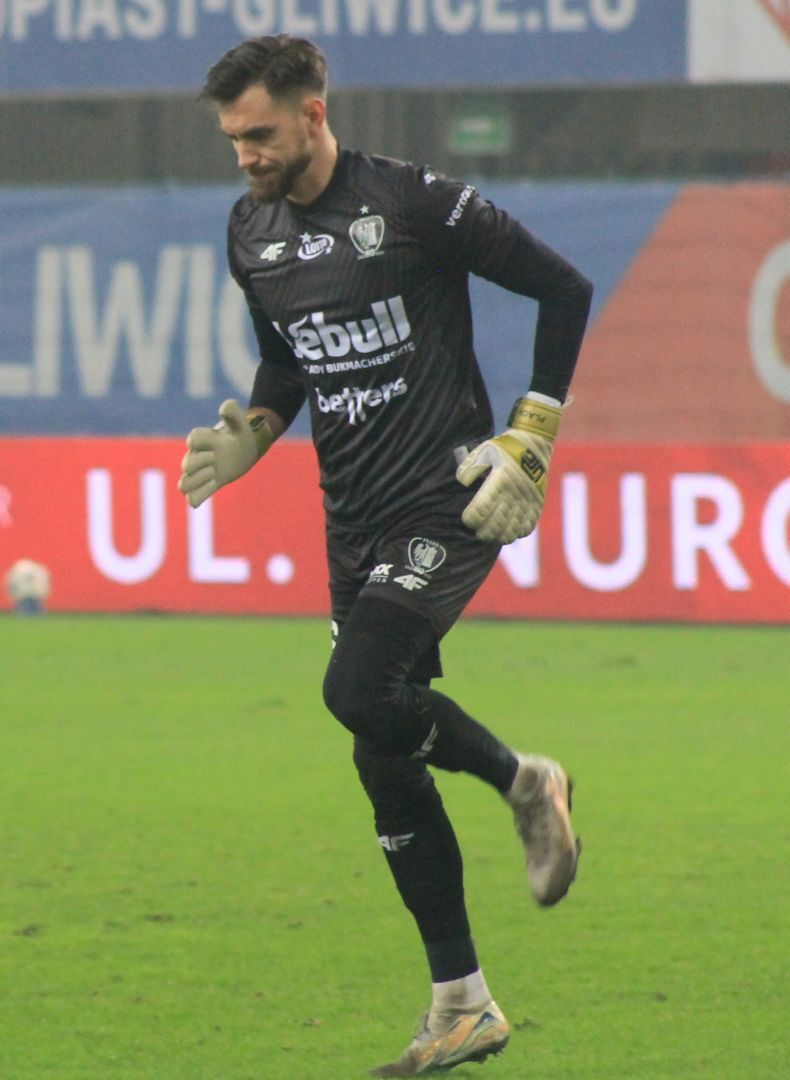
- Plach with Piast Gliwice in 2026

Personal information
- Date of birth: 8 March 1992 (age 34)
- Place of birth: Žilina, Czechoslovakia
- Height: 1.92 m (6 ft 4 in)
- Position: Goalkeeper

Team information
- Current team: Piast Gliwice
- Number: 26

Youth career
- Žilina

Senior career*
Years	Team	Apps	(Gls)
2013–2015	Žilina B		
2013	→ Svätý Jur (loan)		
2015	→ Pohronie (loan)	31	(0)
2016–2017	Senica	26	(0)
2018–	Piast Gliwice	245	(0)

International career
2022	Slovakia	1	(0)
- * Club domestic league appearances and goals as of 11:06, 11 March 2026 (UTC)

František Plach (born 8 March 1992) is a Slovak professional footballer who plays as a goalkeeper for Polish club Piast Gliwice.

== Club career ==
=== FK Senica ===
Plach made his professional debut for FK Senica against MFK Skalica on 2 April 2016.

=== Piast Gliwice ===
Plach moved from Senica to Piast Gliwice on 10 January 2018. In April 2018, Plach spoke to Slovak regional tabloid My about his career in Gliwice. While he did not start in a single competitive game in the spring half of the 2017–18 season, he mentioned he was glad for the transfer and was not worried that he would follow the tracks of Dobrivoj Rusov who spent 2 years there before returning to Slovak top-division team Spartak Trnava.

The 2018–19 season, however, took a major twist for Plach and Piast. While Piast battled to avoid relegation in the previous season, the side championed the Polish league in this edition and Plach was the preferred goalkeeper for the majority of the season, maintaining 12 clean sheets in 25 league matches. After the season, that saw Plach win his first senior trophy, he was nominated to be Ekstaklasa's goalkeeper of the season by the experts at Sportowefakty web-portal, thanks to his 81% save rate and the lowest number of conceded goals (21). He was nominated along with his fellow-Slovak goalkeeper Dušan Kuciak from Lechia Gdańsk, who finished third, and Latvian Pāvels Šteinbors.

In December 2022, Plach extended his contract with Piast until the summer of 2026, with a year option, shutting down claims of a possible transfer to Slovan Bratislava.

== International career ==
On few occasions, Plach was a part of the Slovakia national team call-ups for international fixtures. For the first time, he was recognised by Štefan Tarkovič in August 2021, ahead of three 2022 FIFA World Cup qualifiers. In March 2022, he was called up additionally to replace Martin Dúbravka, who had suffered angina ahead of friendlies against Norway and Finland.

Plach did not make an appearance on 25 March 2022 in Oslo fixture against Norway, as Marek Rodák was given preference. The match concluded in a 2–0 defeat, following strikes by Erling Haaland and Martin Ødegaard. Days late, Dominik Holec, a fellow debutant in the national team, appeared in the starting line-up in the subsequent match, debuting on 29 March 2022 in a neutral field international friendly against Finland. Following an agreement with goalkeeper's coach Miroslav Seman however, Plach and Holec were to feature for one half of the game each. During the first half, Holec faced two shots from the opposing team. Consequently, Plach made his debut starting in the second half. The match concluded in a 2–0 victory, after a first-half strike by Ondrej Duda and a second-half securing goal by Erik Jirka. It was noted, that during the second half, Plach had little problems to solve in goal. Following the match, Holec and Plach both praised the defensive line commanded by Milan Škriniar, expressed pride over representing their nation and claimed that lack of spectators was the only regret related to their debut.

== Career statistics ==
=== Club ===
As of match played 7 March 2026

Appearances and goals by club, season and competition
Club	Season	League			National cup (Note: Includes Slovak Cup, Polish Cup)		Continental		Other		Total	
Club	Season	Division	Apps	Goals	Apps	Goals	Apps	Goals	Apps	Goals	Apps	Goals
Senica	2015–16	Fortuna Liga	3	0	0	0	—		—		3	0
Senica	2016–17	Fortuna Liga	4	0	1	0	—		—		5	0
Senica	2017–18	Fortuna Liga	19	0	0	0	—		—		19	0
Senica	Total		26	0	1	0	—		—		27	0
Piast Gliwice	2017–18	Ekstraklasa	0	0	—		—		—		0	0
Piast Gliwice	2018–19	Ekstraklasa	25	0	1	0	—		—		26	0
Piast Gliwice	2019–20	Ekstraklasa	37	0	1	0	4 (Note: Two appearances in UEFA Champions League, two appearances in UEFA Europa League)	0	0	0	42	0
Piast Gliwice	2020–21	Ekstraklasa	30	0	5	0	3 (Note: Appearances in UEFA Europa League)	0	—		38	0
Piast Gliwice	2021–22	Ekstraklasa	33	0	1	0	—		—		34	0
Piast Gliwice	2022–23	Ekstraklasa	34	0	0	0	—		—		34	0
Piast Gliwice	2023–24	Ekstraklasa	28	0	3	0	—		—		31	0
Piast Gliwice	2024–25	Ekstraklasa	34	0	0	0	—		—		34	0
Piast Gliwice	2025–26	Ekstraklasa	24	0	1	0	—		—		25	0
Piast Gliwice	Total		245	0	12	0	7	0	0	0	264	0
Career total			271	0	13	0	7	0	0	0	291	0

=== International ===
As of match played 29 March 2022

Appearances and goals by national team and year
National team	Year	Apps	Goals
Slovakia
Slovakia	2022	1	0
Total		1	0

== Honours ==
Piast Gliwice

- Ekstraklasa: 2018–19

Individual

- Ekstraklasa Goalkeeper of the Season: 2018–19
