= Tommaso Guercio =

Footballer (born 2005)

Tomasso Guercio
Personal information
- Date of birth: 1 June 2005 (age 21)
- Place of birth: Codogno, Italy
- Height: 1.86 m (6 ft 1 in)
- Position: Defender

Team information
- Current team: Carrarese (on loan from Śląsk Wrocław)
- Number: 78

Youth career
- –2024: Inter Milan

Senior career*
| Years | Team | Apps | (Gls) |
| 2024– | Śląsk Wrocław | 50 | (3) |
| 2024 | Śląsk Wrocław II | 6 | (0) |
| 2026– | → Carrarese (loan) | 0 | (0) |

International career^{‡}
| 2019 | Poland U15 | 2 | (0) |
| 2021 | Poland U16 | 2 | (0) |
| 2021–2022 | Poland U18 | 9 | (1) |
| 2022–2023 | Poland U19 | 8 | (0) |
| 2024 | Poland U20 | 2 | (0) |
- * Club domestic league appearances and goals as of 13:01, 9 May 2026 (UTC) ‡ National team caps and goals as of 11 October 2024

Tommaso Guercio (Polish: Tomasz Guercio; born 1 June 2005) is a professional footballer who plays as a defender for Serie B club Carrarese, on loan from I liga club Śląsk Wrocław. Born in Italy, he is a Poland youth international.

== Early life ==
Guercio was born in 2005 in Codogno, Italy, to a Polish mother and an Italian father.

== Club career ==
Guercio is a graduate of the Inter Milan youth system. On 2 February 2024, he moved to Ekstraklasa club Śląsk Wrocław on a two-and-a-half-year contract, with an option for another two years.

On 2 February 2026, Guercio joined Serie B club Carrarese on loan with an option to buy.

== Style of play ==
Guercio mainly operates as a defender and is known for his versatility as a defender.

== Personal life ==
Guercio is the younger brother of Italian footballer Davide Guercio.

== Career statistics ==
As of match played 8 December 2025

Appearances and goals by club, season and competition
| Club | Season | League | | | National cup (Note: Includes Polish Cup) | | Europe | | Other | | Total | |
| Club | Season | Division | Apps | Goals | Apps | Goals | Apps | Goals | Apps | Goals | Apps | Goals |
|---|---|---|---|---|---|---|---|---|---|---|---|---|
| Inter Milan | 2023–24 | Serie A | 0 | 0 | 0 | 0 | 0 | 0 | 0 | 0 | 0 | 0 |
| Śląsk Wrocław | 2023–24 | Ekstraklasa | 4 | 0 | — | | — | | — | | 4 | 0 |
| Śląsk Wrocław | 2024–25 | Ekstraklasa | 30 | 3 | 2 | 0 | 4 (Note: Appearances in UEFA Conference League) | 0 | — | | 36 | 3 |
| Śląsk Wrocław | 2025–26 | I liga | 16 | 0 | 1 | 0 | — | | — | | 17 | 0 |
| Śląsk Wrocław | Total | | 50 | 3 | 3 | 0 | 4 | 0 | 0 | 0 | 57 | 3 |
| Śląsk Wrocław II | 2023–24 | III liga, gr. III | 5 | 0 | — | | — | | — | | 5 | 0 |
| Śląsk Wrocław II | 2024–25 | III liga, gr. III | 1 | 0 | — | | — | | — | | 1 | 0 |
| Śląsk Wrocław II | Total | | 6 | 0 | — | | — | | — | | 6 | 0 |
| Carrarese (loan) | 2025–26 | Serie B | 0 | 0 | — | | — | | — | | 0 | 0 |
| Career total | | | 56 | 3 | 3 | 0 | 4 | 0 | 0 | 0 | 63 | 3 |

== Honours ==
Śląsk Wrocław II

- III liga, group III: 2024–25
