= Piotr Mosór =

Polish footballer

Personal information
- Date of birth: 28 March 1974 (age 52)
- Place of birth: Maków Podhalański, Poland
- Height: 1.85 m (6 ft 1 in)
- Position: Defender

Youth career
- Garbarz Zembrzyce
- GKS Katowice

Senior career*
Years	Team	Apps	(Gls)
1990–1991	GKS Katowice	0	(0)
1992–1994	Ruch Chorzów	64	(1)
1994–1999	Legia Warsaw	119	(7)
1996	→ Lechia Gdańsk (loan)	16	(1)
2000	Widzew Łódź	11	(0)
2000–2001	Pogoń Szczecin	18	(1)
2002	Amica Wronki	8	(0)
2002	Wisła Płock	3	(0)
2003	Widzew Łódź	24	(0)
2004–2005	Ruch Chorzów	27	(0)
2005–2006	Świt Nowy Dwór		
2007	Mazur Karczew		
2008	Naprzód Zielonki		
2013–2014	Unia Warsaw		

International career
- Poland U21

Managerial career
- 2009–2010: Świt Nowy Dwór
- 2013–2014: Legionovia Legionowo
- 2019–2020: Znicz Pruszków
- * Club domestic league appearances and goals

Piotr Mosór (born 28 March 1974) is a Polish professional football manager and former player who played as a defender.

== Personal life ==
His son, Ariel Mosór, is a professional football player.

== Honours ==
Legia Warsaw

- Ekstraklasa: 1994–95
- Polish Cup: 1994–95, 1996–97
- Polish Super Cup: 1994
