= Damian Kądzior =

Polish footballer (born 1992)

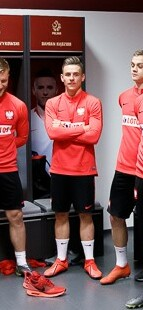
- Damian Kądzior with Poland in 2019

Personal information
- Full name: Damian Kądzior
- Date of birth: 16 June 1992 (age 34)
- Place of birth: Białystok, Poland
- Height: 1.74 m (5 ft 9 in)
- Position: Winger

Team information
- Current team: GKS Tychy
- Number: 10

Youth career
- –2012: Jagiellonia Białystok

Senior career*
Years	Team	Apps	(Gls)
2012–2016	Jagiellonia Białystok	3	(0)
2012–2014	→ Motor Lublin (loan)	46	(8)
2014–2015	→ Dolcan Ząbki (loan)	31	(7)
2015–2016	→ Wigry Suwałki (loan)	14	(4)
2016–2017	Wigry Suwałki	33	(14)
2017–2018	Górnik Zabrze	37	(9)
2018–2020	Dinamo Zagreb	58	(16)
2020–2021	Eibar	6	(0)
2021	→ Alanyaspor (loan)	17	(0)
2021–2025	Piast Gliwice	96	(12)
2025	→ Stal Mielec (loan)	10	(0)
2025–	GKS Tychy	38	(5)

International career
2018–2020	Poland	6	(1)
- * Club domestic league appearances and goals as of 11:17, 11 September 2026 (UTC)

Damian Kądzior (born 16 June 1992) is a Polish professional footballer who plays as a winger for II liga club GKS Tychy.

== Club career ==
Kądzior was born in Białystok, Poland, where he joined the Jagiellonia Białystok youth academy.

=== Jagiellonia Białystok ===
Kądzior started playing for the Jagiellonia senior team in 2012, and made three appearances before being loaned out.

==== Loan to Motor Lublin ====
Kądzior joined Motor Lublin on loan on a two-year loan. During his time at Lublin, he scored eight goals in total for the club.

==== Loan to Dolcan Ząbki ====
In January 2015, Kądzior joined Dolcan Ząbki on a temporary basis, where he made a total of 33 appearances, scoring eight goals.

==== Loan to Wigry Suwałki ====
On 29 February 2016, Kądzior moved on loan to Wigry Suwałki until the end of the season. He scored four goals in 14 appearances for the club.

=== Wigry Suwałki ===
On 1 July 2016, he joined the club on a free transfer. During his time at the club, he scored a total of 20 goals in 53 appearances.

=== Górnik Zabrze ===
On 4 July 2017, he joined Górnik Zabrze. He made his debut on 15 July that year, in a 3–1 win over Legia Warsaw, playing a total of 62 minutes. He scored his first goal on 10 September, in a 2–1 victory over Bruk-Bet Termalica. On 20 October, he scored twice during a 3–3 draw with Korona Kielce. His last appearance for the club was in a 2–0 win over Wisła Kraków.

=== Dinamo Zagreb ===
In the early days of June 2018, several Croatian newspaper websites, such as 24sata, had reported that Kądzior was close to a move to champions Dinamo Zagreb. On 18 June, the club officially announced that Kądzior, along with several others players, had joined the club, for a reported fee of around €500,000. He was assigned the squad number 92.

=== SD Eibar ===
On 29 August 2020, Kądzior agreed to a three-year deal with La Liga side Eibar. The club informed about the transfer in its Internet page. The transfer cost €2,000,000 plus the additional bonuses. Eibar was the second club outside of Poland in his career.

He debuted in La Liga on 12 October 2020 in a first match of the season with Celta Vigo, coming off the bench in the 61st minute, replacing Takashi Inui. His first appearance in the starting line-up came in a 1–2 loss to Athletic Bilbao on 27 October. After a discussion with the national team coach Jerzy Brzęczek, Kądzior did not attend Poland's training camp in November 2020 to stay in Atxabalpe. He recorded his assist for Eibar on 7 January 2021, in a Copa del Rey win against Las Rozas CF, when in 14th minute of the match he crossed the ball to Yoshinori Muto.

==== Loan to Alanyaspor ====
On 19 January 2021, Kądzior moved to Alanyaspor, on a loan until the end of the season. He successfully underwent medical testing the day before the announcement. He debuted in Alanyaspor two days later, in a Süper Lig match against Erzurumspor, he came off the bench in 74th minute, changing Adam Bareiro. Before the match, he went to two training sessions. On 4 March 2021, in his eighth appearance for the club, Kądzior recorded his first assist, when in 53rd minute of the match with Göztepe he had crossed the ball to Georgios Tzavellas, who scored the goal. On 8 March 2021, he suffered an ankle injury during a match against Trabzonspor.

=== Piast Gliwice ===
On 19 July 2021, after completing a medical, Piast Gliwice announced the signing of Kądzior on a three-year deal. He debuted in Piast on 25 July 2021 in a 2–3 loss to Raków Częstochowa, when in the 80th minute he came off the bench, replacing Dominik Steczyk. He scored his first goal in Piast on 29 September 2021, in the first round of Polish Cup, in the match with Włocłavia Włocławek. That goal was scored from a penalty kick. A year later, his contract with Piast was prolonged to the end of June 2025. On 19 March 2023, he sustained an ankle injury while training before the match with Miedź Legnica. A few days later, he underwent surgery and was unable to play for the remainder of the season.

==== Loan to Stal Mielec ====
On 14 February 2025, Kądzior moved to fellow Ekstraklasa side Stal Mielec on loan for the remainder of the season.

=== GKS Tychy ===
On 19 June 2025, Kądzior signed a two-year contract with second tier side GKS Tychy.

== International career ==
In May 2018, Kądzior was named in the Poland national team's preliminary 35-man squad for the 2018 FIFA World Cup, hosted in Russia. However, he did not make the final 23-man squad. He made his debut for his country on 11 September 2018 in a friendly against Ireland. His first goal for Poland came on 10 June, against Israel during the UEFA 2020 Qualifiers.

== Career statistics ==
=== Club ===
As of match played 24 May 2026

Appearances and goals by club, season and competition
Club	Season	League			National cup (Note: Includes Polish Cup, Croatian Cup, Copa del Rey, Turkish Cup)		Europe		Other		Total	
Club	Season	Division	Apps	Goals	Apps	Goals	Apps	Goals	Apps	Goals	Apps	Goals
Jagiellonia Białystok	2012–13	Ekstraklasa	2	0	1	0	—		—		3	0
Jagiellonia Białystok	2014–15	Ekstraklasa	1	0	1	0	—		—		2	0
Jagiellonia Białystok	Total		3	0	2	0	—		—		5	0
Motor Lublin (loan)	2012–13	II liga	14	1	0	0	—		—		14	1
Motor Lublin (loan)	2013–14	II liga	32	7	2	0	—		—		34	7
Motor Lublin (loan)	Total		46	8	2	0	—		—		48	8
Dolcan Ząbki (loan)	2014–15	I liga	14	2	0	0	—		—		14	2
Dolcan Ząbki (loan)	2015–16	I liga	17	5	2	1	—		—		19	6
Dolcan Ząbki (loan)	Total		31	7	2	1	—		—		33	8
Wigry Suwałki (loan)	2015–16	I liga	14	4	0	0	—		—		14	4
Wigry Suwałki	2016–17	I liga	33	14	6	2	—		—		39	16
Wigry Suwałki	Total		47	18	6	2	—		—		53	20
Górnik Zabrze	2017–18	Ekstraklasa	37	10	7	2	—		—		44	12
Dinamo Zagreb	2018–19	Prva HNL	28	6	4	2	8 (Note: Three appearances in UEFA Champions League, five appearances in UEFA Europa League)	0	–		40	8
Dinamo Zagreb	2019–20	Prva HNL	30	10	3	3	4 (Note: Appearances in UEFA Europa League)	0	1 (Note: Appearance in Croatian Super Cup)	0	38	13
Dinamo Zagreb	Total		58	16	7	5	12	0	1	0	78	21
Eibar	2020–21	La Liga	6	0	2	0	—		—		8	0
Alanyaspor (loan)	2020–21	Süper Lig	17	0	1	0	—		—		18	0
Piast Gliwice	2021–22	Ekstraklasa	33	6	3	1	—		—		36	7
Piast Gliwice	2022–23	Ekstraklasa	21	3	3	0	—		—		24	3
Piast Gliwice	2023–24	Ekstraklasa	25	2	4	1	—		—		29	3
Piast Gliwice	2024–25	Ekstraklasa	17	1	1	0	—		—		18	1
Piast Gliwice	Total		96	12	11	2	—		—		107	14
Stal Mielec (loan)	2024–25	Ekstraklasa	10	0	—		—		—		10	0
GKS Tychy	2025–26	I liga	31	4	1	0	—		—		32	4
Career total			382	75	41	12	12	0	1	0	436	87

=== International ===
Appearances and goals by national team and year
National team	Year	Apps	Goals
Poland	2018	3	0
Poland	2019	1	1
Poland	2020	2	0
Total		6	1

Scores and results list Poland's goal tally first, score column indicates score after each Kądzior goal.

List of international goals scored by Damian Kądzior
No.	Date	Venue	Opponent	Score	Result	Competition
1	10 June 2019	Stadion Narodowy, Warsaw, Poland	Israel	4–0	4–0	UEFA Euro 2020 qualification

== Honours ==
Dinamo Zagreb

- Croatian First League: 2018–19, 2019–20
- Croatian Super Cup: 2019

Individual

- I liga Player of the Year: 2016
- Dinamo Zagreb Player of the Year: 2020
