= Domen Gril =

Slovenian footballer

Personal information
- Date of birth: 10 June 2001 (age 25)
- Place of birth: Maribor, Slovenia
- Height: 1.90 m (6 ft 3 in)
- Position: Goalkeeper

Team information
- Current team: Piast Gliwice
- Number: 75

Youth career
- Bistrica
- 2016–2018: Bravo

Senior career*
Years	Team	Apps	(Gls)
2018–2019	Bravo	27	(0)
2020–2022	TSG 1899 Hoffenheim II	0	(0)
2020	→ Bravo (loan)	1	(0)
2021–2022	→ Académico Viseu (loan)	27	(0)
2022–2026	Académico Viseu	102	(0)
2026–	Piast Gliwice	0	(0)

International career
2016	Slovenia U15	6	(0)
2016–2017	Slovenia U16	4	(0)
2016–2018	Slovenia U17	21	(0)
2018	Slovenia U18	2	(0)
2018–2020	Slovenia U19	20	(0)
2019–2020	Slovenia U21	2	(0)
- * Club domestic league appearances and goals as of 19 June 2026

Domen Gril (born 10 June 2001) is a Slovenian professional footballer who plays as a goalkeeper for Ekstraklasa club Piast Gliwice.

== Club career ==
=== Bravo ===
Gril joined Bravo in 2016 at the age of 15 from Bistrica. On 26 September 2018, 17-year old Gril made his official debut for Bravo against Dob in the Slovenian Second League. He played 18 league games in that season and helped the team promoting to the Slovenian PrvaLiga.

=== TSG 1899 Hoffenheim ===
At the end of the 2019 summer transfer window, German club TSG 1899 Hoffenheim showed interest in Gril. However, he stayed in Bravo. But the rumors appeared again in November 2019, saying that Hoffenheim already had an agreement with Bravo for the transfer of Gril. The deal was officially announced on 13 December 2019 and became a record deal for Bravo.

Gril signed a deal with Hoffenheim until the summer 2024 but stayed on loan at Bravo for the rest of the season. He played only one game during the last six months of his time at Bravo, before returning to Hoffenheim in July 2020. In September 2020, he struggled with back problems which kept him out for some time.

=== Académico de Viseu ===
On 25 August 2021, Hoffenheim sent Gril on a season-long loan to Liga Portugal 2 club Académico de Viseu. After the season, he joined the team on a permanent deal, signing a four-year contract.

=== Piast Gliwice ===
On 23 June 2026, Polish club Piast Gliwice announced the signing of Gril on a three-year contract.

== Honours ==
Bravo

- Slovenian Second League: 2018–19

Individual

- Liga Portugal 2 Goalkeeper of the Season: 2022–23
- Liga Portugal 2 Team of the Season: 2022–23
- Liga Portugal 2 Goalkeeper of the Month: December 2022/January 2023, March 2023, January 2024
