= Michael Ameyaw =

Polish footballer (born 2000)

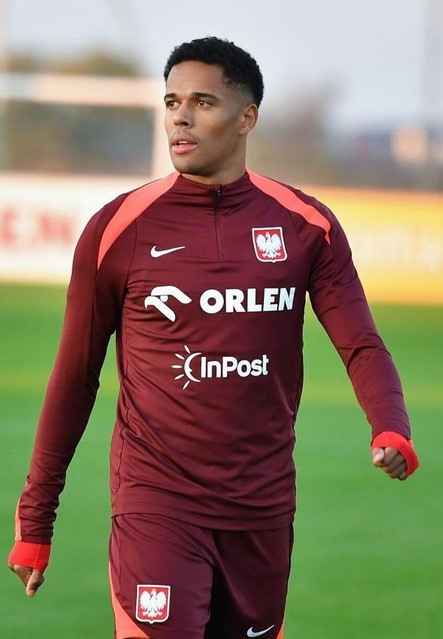
- Ameyaw with Poland in 2024

Personal information
- Date of birth: 16 September 2000 (age 26)
- Place of birth: Łódź, Poland
- Height: 1.75 m (5 ft 9 in)
- Position: Winger

Team information
- Current team: Korona Kielce
- Number: 19

Youth career
- –2011: Żmuda Warsaw
- 2011–2013: Polonia Warsaw
- 2013–2014: SEMP Ursynów
- 2014–2018: Polonia Warsaw

Senior career*
| Years | Team | Apps | (Gls) |
| 2018–2021 | Widzew Łódź | 61 | (2) |
| 2020 | → Bytovia Bytów (loan) | 14 | (2) |
| 2021–2024 | Piast Gliwice | 84 | (13) |
| 2024–2026 | Raków Częstochowa | 43 | (3) |
| 2026– | Korona Kielce | 0 | (0) |

International career
| 2024 | Poland | 2 | (0) |
- * Club domestic league appearances and goals as of 22:07, 28 August 2026 (UTC)

Michael Ameyaw (born 16 September 2000) is a Polish professional footballer who plays as a winger for Ekstraklasa club Korona Kielce.

== Career ==
=== Youth career ===
Ameyaw started his career with Żmuda Warsaw before moving to Polonia Warsaw, where he remained until 2018, with an exception for the 2013–14 season, when he played for SEMP Ursynów. In 2017, he underwent a trial at Dutch club Feyenoord.

==== Widzew Łódź ====
On 30 June 2018, Ameyaw signed a three-year deal with Polish II liga side Widzew Łódź. He debuted on 21 July 2021, in the first match of the league season, coming off the bench in the final minutes of a 1–0 league win over Olimpia Elbląg. He made his first starting line-up appearance in the starting lineup on 13 October 2018 in a match with Skra Częstochowa, which was won by Widzew 2–0. He scored his first goal in the club on 27 April 2019 in a 1–1 draw against Skra.

==== Loan to Bytovia Bytów ====
In 2020, he was loaned to Bytovia Bytów. He scored his first goal there in the first minute of 1–3 away win over Błękitni Stargard on 17 June 2020.

=== Piast Gliwice ===
On 20 May 2021, Piast Gliwice announced the signing of Ameyaw on a free transfer, signing a three-year deal. Ameyaw made his Ekstraklasa debut on 25 July 2021 in a 3–2 loss to Raków Częstochowa. He scored his first top-flight goal in a 4–2 loss to Cracovia on 27 September 2021.

=== Raków Częstochowa ===
On 6 September 2024, Ameyaw signed a five-year deal with Raków Częstochowa, after having his €1 million release clause exercised. He made his debut for Raków nine days later, starting in a 1–0 away league win against Legia Warsaw.

=== Korona Kielce ===
On 4 September 2026, Ameyaw transferred to fellow Ekstraklasa club Korona Kielce on a three-year contract, with an option for a further year.

== International career ==
Ameyaw was born in Poland to a Ghanaian father and a Polish mother. In September 2024, he was called up to represent the Poland national team for a set of UEFA Nations League matches in October 2024. He made his debut against Portugal at the PGE Narodowy on 12 October, replacing Nicola Zalewski in the 76th-minute of a 3–1 loss.

== Career statistics ==
=== Club ===
As of match played 27 August 2026

Appearances and goals by club, season and competition
| Club | Season | League | | | Polish Cup | | Europe | | Other | | Total | |
| Club | Season | Division | Apps | Goals | Apps | Goals | Apps | Goals | Apps | Goals | Apps | Goals |
|---|---|---|---|---|---|---|---|---|---|---|---|---|
| Widzew Łódź | 2018–19 | II liga | 18 | 0 | — | | — | | — | | 18 | 0 |
| Widzew Łódź | 2019–20 | II liga | 16 | 0 | 0 | 0 | — | | — | | 16 | 0 |
| Widzew Łódź | 2020–21 | I liga | 27 | 2 | 2 | 0 | — | | — | | 29 | 2 |
| Widzew Łódź | Total | | 61 | 2 | 2 | 0 | — | | — | | 63 | 2 |
| Bytovia Bytów (loan) | 2019–20 | II liga | 13 | 2 | — | | — | | 1 (Note: Appearance in II liga promotion play-offs) | 0 | 14 | 2 |
| Piast Gliwice | 2021–22 | Ekstraklasa | 18 | 1 | 3 | 0 | — | | — | | 21 | 1 |
| Piast Gliwice | 2022–23 | Ekstraklasa | 27 | 3 | 3 | 0 | — | | — | | 30 | 3 |
| Piast Gliwice | 2023–24 | Ekstraklasa | 32 | 6 | 5 | 2 | — | | — | | 37 | 8 |
| Piast Gliwice | 2024–25 | Ekstraklasa | 7 | 3 | — | | — | | — | | 7 | 3 |
| Piast Gliwice | Total | | 84 | 13 | 11 | 2 | — | | — | | 95 | 15 |
| Raków Częstochowa | 2024–25 | Ekstraklasa | 12 | 0 | 1 | 0 | — | | — | | 13 | 0 |
| Raków Częstochowa | 2025–26 | Ekstraklasa | 28 | 3 | 5 | 0 | 13 (Note: Appearances in UEFA Conference League) | 0 | — | | 46 | 3 |
| Raków Częstochowa | 2026–27 | Ekstraklasa | 3 | 0 | — | | 6 | 1 | — | | 9 | 1 |
| Raków Częstochowa | Total | | 43 | 3 | 6 | 0 | 19 | 1 | — | | 68 | 4 |
| Korona Kielce | 2026–27 | Ekstraklasa | 0 | 0 | 0 | 0 | — | | — | | 0 | 0 |
| Career total | | | 201 | 20 | 19 | 2 | 19 | 1 | 1 | 0 | 240 | 23 |

=== International ===
As of match played 15 October 2024

Appearances and goals by national team and year
| National team | Year | Apps | Goals |
|---|---|---|---|
Poland
| Poland | 2024 | 2 | 0 |
| Total | | 2 | 0 |
