= Arkadiusz Pyrka =

Polish footballer

- Pyrka with FC St. Pauli in 2026

Personal information
- Date of birth: 20 September 2002 (age 24)
- Place of birth: Radom, Poland
- Height: 1.77 m (5 ft 10 in)
- Positions: Right-back; winger

Team information
- Current team: FC St. Pauli
- Number: 11

Youth career
- –2014: Radomiak Radom
- 2014–2017: Broń Radom
- 2017–2018: Znicz Pruszków

Senior career*
Years	Team	Apps	(Gls)
2018–2020	Znicz Pruszków	45	(2)
2020–2025	Piast Gliwice	136	(5)
2025–	FC St. Pauli	40	(0)

International career^{‡}
2020	Poland U19	1	(0)
2021–2022	Poland U20	9	(1)
2022–2025	Poland U21	19	(1)
2025–	Poland	5	(0)
- * Club domestic league appearances and goals as of 20:30, 23 October 2026 (UTC) ‡ National team caps and goals as of 23:23, 17 November 2026 (UTC)

Arkadiusz Pyrka (born 20 September 2002) is a Polish professional footballer who plays as a right-back for 2. Bundesliga club FC St. Pauli and the Poland national team.

== Club career ==
=== Youth ===
Pyrka played for clubs in his hometown Radomiak Radom and Broń Radom before moving to Znicz Pruszków under 19 team in 2017.

=== Znicz Pruszków ===
On 20 July 2018, Pyrka joined the first team of Znicz in the II liga.

=== Piast Gliwice ===
Pyrka joined Ekstraklasa team Piast Gliwice on 4 August 2020. He made a total of over 150 appearances across all competitions in five seasons.

=== FC St. Pauli ===
On 1 July 2025, Pyrka signed for Bundesliga side FC St. Pauli.

== International career ==
=== Poland youth teams ===
From 2020 to 2025, Pyrka played for various Polish national youth teams. He played for Poland U21 during the 2023 UEFA European Under-21 Championship.

=== Poland ===
Pyrka received his first call-up for Poland for 2026 FIFA World Cup qualification matches against Netherlands on 4 September 2025 and Finland on 7 September 2025.

On 9 October 2025, he made his debut for Poland during a friendly match against New Zealand which Poland won 1–0.

== Career statistics ==
=== Club ===
As of match played 23 October 2026

Appearances and goals by club, season and competition
Club	Season	League			National cup (Note: Includes Polish Cup, DFB-Pokal)		Europe		Other		Total	
Club	Season	Division	Apps	Goals	Apps	Goals	Apps	Goals	Apps	Goals	Apps	Goals
Znicz Pruszków	2018–19	II liga	18	0	1	0	—		—		19	0
Znicz Pruszków	2019–20	II liga	27	2	1	0	—		—		28	2
Znicz Pruszków	Total		45	2	2	0	—		—		47	2
Piast Gliwice	2020–21	Ekstraklasa	23	0	5	2	0	0	—		28	2
Piast Gliwice	2021–22	Ekstraklasa	30	2	3	0	—		—		33	2
Piast Gliwice	2022–23	Ekstraklasa	33	2	3	1	—		—		36	3
Piast Gliwice	2023–24	Ekstraklasa	32	0	5	0	—		—		37	0
Piast Gliwice	2024–25	Ekstraklasa	18	1	3	0	—		—		21	1
Piast Gliwice	Total		136	5	19	3	0	0	—		155	8
FC St. Pauli	2025–26	Bundesliga	31	0	4	0	—		—		35	0
FC St. Pauli	2026–27	2. Bundesliga	9	0	1	0	—		—		10	0
FC St. Pauli	Total		40	0	5	0	—		—		45	0
Career total			221	7	26	3	0	0	0	0	246	10

=== International ===
As of match played 17 November 2026

Appearances and goals by national team and year
National team	Year	Apps	Goals
Poland	2025	1	0
Poland	2026	4	0
Total		5	0
