= Michał Kaput =

Polish footballer

Personal information
- Full name: Michał Kaput
- Date of birth: 18 February 1998 (age 28)
- Place of birth: Wyszków, Poland
- Height: 1.85 m (6 ft 1 in)
- Position: Central midfielder

Team information
- Current team: ŁKS Łódź

Youth career
- WOSiR Wyszków
- 2011–2017: Polonia Warsaw

Senior career*
Years	Team	Apps	(Gls)
2017–2018	ŁKS 1926 Łomża	30	(2)
2018–2021	Radomiak Radom	110	(5)
2022–2024	Piast Gliwice	27	(0)
2023–2024	→ Radomiak Radom (loan)	23	(0)
2024–2026	Radomiak Radom	47	(2)
2026–	ŁKS Łódź	0	(0)
- * Club domestic league appearances and goals as of 22:37, 29 May 2026 (UTC)

Michał Kaput (born 18 February 1998) is a Polish professional footballer who plays as a central midfielder for I liga club ŁKS Łódź.

== Honours ==
Radomiak Radom

- I liga: 2020–21
- II liga: 2018–19
