= Jorge Félix (Spanish footballer) =

Spanish footballer

Personal information
- Full name: Jorge Félix Muñoz García
- Date of birth: 22 August 1991 (age 35)
- Place of birth: Madrid, Spain
- Height: 1.75 m (5 ft 9 in)
- Position: Winger

Team information
- Current team: Piast Gliwice
- Number: 7

Youth career
- 2008–2010: Atlético Madrid

Senior career*
Years	Team	Apps	(Gls)
2010–2011	Atlético Madrid C	28	(1)
2011–2012	Moscardó	35	(6)
2012–2014	Getafe B	60	(5)
2014–2015	Alcorcón B	16	(0)
2015	Trival Valderas	16	(6)
2015–2017	Rayo Majadahonda	73	(13)
2017–2018	Lleida Esportiu	37	(10)
2018–2020	Piast Gliwice	67	(22)
2020–2022	Sivasspor	29	(5)
2022–	Piast Gliwice	122	(21)
- * Club domestic league appearances and goals as of 11:36, 14 September 2026 (UTC)

Jorge Félix Muñoz García (born 22 August 1991) is a Spanish professional footballer who plays as a left winger for Ekstraklasa club Piast Gliwice.

== Club career ==
Born in Madrid, Félix graduated from the youth academy of Atlético Madrid, but only represented its C team as a senior. He went on to feature for CDC Moscardó, Getafe CF B, AD Alcorcón B and CF Trival Valderas, in both Segunda División B and Tercera División.

On 24 June 2015, Félix signed with third-tier club CF Rayo Majadahonda. He made his competitive debut 23 August, coming on as a 66th-minute substitute for Álex García in a 0–0 away draw against CD Mensajero. Having been his team's top scorer during the 2016–17 season with eight goals, he was released in June.

Félix joined Lleida Esportiu of the same league on 27 June 2017. He scored his first goal for them on 20 August, in a 1–1 draw at CF Badalona. During his spell at the Camp d'Esports, he netted ten times from 43 matches.

On 2 July 2018, Félix moved abroad after agreeing to a two-year contract with Polish side Piast Gliwice. He made his debut in top-flight football later that month, starting the 2–1 Ekstraklasa away win over Zagłębie Sosnowiec.

On 2 August 2022, after a two-year stint in the Turkish Süper Lig with Sivasspor, Félix returned to Piast on a two-year deal with an extension option. On 4 April 2025, the 33-year-old renewed his contract until June 2027.

== Career statistics ==
As of match played 23 May 2026

Appearances and goals by club, season and competition
Club	Season	League			National cup (Note: Includes Copa del Rey, Polish Cup, Turkish Cup)		Continental		Other		Total	
Club	Season	Division	Apps	Goals	Apps	Goals	Apps	Goals	Apps	Goals	Apps	Goals
Getafe B	2012–13	Segunda División B	28	3	—		—		—		28	3
Getafe B	2013–14	Segunda División B	32	2	—		—		—		32	2
Getafe B	Total		60	5	—		—		—		60	5
Alcorcón B	2014–15	Tercera División	16	0	—		—		—		16	0
Trival Valderas	2014–15	Segunda División B	16	6	—		—		—		16	6
Rayo Majadahonda	2015–16	Segunda División B	35	5	1	0	—		—		36	5
Rayo Majadahonda	2016–17	Segunda División B	38	8	0	0	—		2 (Note: Appearances in Segunda División B promotion play-offs)	0	40	8
Rayo Majadahonda	Total		73	13	1	0	—		2	0	76	13
Lleida Esportiu	2017–18	Segunda División B	37	10	6	0	—		—		43	10
Piast Gliwice	2018–19	Ekstraklasa	34	6	1	0	—		—		35	6
Piast Gliwice	2019–20	Ekstraklasa	33	16	1	0	4 (Note: Two appearances in UEFA Champions League, two appearances and two goals in UEFA Europa League)	3	1 (Note: Appearance in Polish Super Cup)	0	39	19
Piast Gliwice	Total		67	22	2	0	4	3	1	0	74	25
Sivasspor	2020–21	Süper Lig	17	2	3	0	0	0	—		20	2
Sivasspor	2021–22	Süper Lig	12	3	2	0	6 (Note: Appearances in UEFA Europa League)	1	—		20	4
Sivasspor	Total		29	5	5	0	6	1	—		40	6
Piast Gliwice	2022–23	Ekstraklasa	29	3	2	1	—		—		31	4
Piast Gliwice	2023–24	Ekstraklasa	31	7	4	2	—		—		35	9
Piast Gliwice	2024–25	Ekstraklasa	24	7	3	1	—		—		27	8
Piast Gliwice	2025–26	Ekstraklasa	33	4	3	0	—		—		36	4
Piast Gliwice	Total		117	21	12	4	—		—		129	25
Career total			415	82	26	4	10	4	3	0	454	90

== Honours ==
Piast Gliwice

- Ekstraklasa: 2018–19

Sivasspor

- Turkish Cup: 2021–22

Individual

- Ekstraklasa Player of the Season: 2019–20
- Piłka Nożna Foreigner of the Year: 2019
