= Aleks Ławniczak =

Polish professional footballer

Personal information
- Full name: Aleks Ławniczak
- Date of birth: 5 May 1999 (age 27)
- Place of birth: Poznań, Poland
- Height: 1.90 m (6 ft 3 in)
- Position: Centre-back

Team information
- Current team: Zagłębie Lubin
- Number: 5

Youth career
- –2011: 1920 Mosina
- 2011–2018: Warta Poznań

Senior career*
Years	Team	Apps	(Gls)
2018–2022	Warta Poznań	58	(2)
2018–2019	→ Miedź Legnica II (loan)	29	(1)
2022–	Zagłębie Lubin	124	(9)
2026–	Zagłębie Lubin II	1	(0)
- * Club domestic league appearances and goals as of 00:10, 11 October 2026 (UTC)

Aleks Ławniczak (born 5 May 1999) is a Polish professional footballer who plays as a centre-back for Ekstraklasa club Zagłębie Lubin.

== Career statistics ==
As of match played 12 September 2025

Appearances and goals by club, season and competition
Club	Season	League			Polish Cup		Europe		Other		Total	
Club	Season	Division	Apps	Goals	Apps	Goals	Apps	Goals	Apps	Goals	Apps	Goals
Miedź Legnica II (loan)	2018–19	III liga, gr. III	29	1	—		—		—		29	1
Warta Poznań	2019–20	I liga	23	1	1	0	—		—		24	1
Warta Poznań	2020–21	Ekstraklasa	23	1	1	0	—		—		24	1
Warta Poznań	2021–22	Ekstraklasa	12	0	1	0	—		—		13	0
Warta Poznań	Total		58	2	3	0	—		—		61	2
Zagłębie Lubin	2021–22	Ekstraklasa	8	0	—		—		—		8	0
Zagłębie Lubin	2022–23	Ekstraklasa	27	0	1	1	—		—		28	1
Zagłębie Lubin	2023–24	Ekstraklasa	29	4	0	0	—		—		29	4
Zagłębie Lubin	2024–25	Ekstraklasa	33	2	2	0	—		—		35	2
Zagłębie Lubin	2025–26	Ekstraklasa	17	1	2	0	—		—		19	1
Zagłębie Lubin	Total		114	7	5	1	—		—		119	8
Zagłębie Lubin II	2025–26	III liga, gr. III	1	0	—		—		—		1	0
Career total			202	10	8	1	—		—		210	11
