= Miłosz Szczepański =

Polish footballer

Personal information
- Date of birth: 22 March 1998 (age 28)
- Place of birth: Nowy Sącz, Poland
- Height: 1.68 m (5 ft 6 in)
- Position: Attacking midfielder

Team information
- Current team: Unia Skierniewice
- Number: 30

Youth career
- 2012–2013: Dunajec Nowy Sącz
- 2013–2015: Legia Warsaw

Senior career*
Years	Team	Apps	(Gls)
2015–2018	Legia Warsaw II	64	(11)
2017–2018	Legia Warsaw	0	(0)
2018–2021	Raków Częstochowa	61	(8)
2021–2023	Lechia Gdańsk	3	(0)
2022	→ Warta Poznań (loan)	13	(2)
2022–2023	→ Warta Poznań (loan)	27	(4)
2023–2025	Piast Gliwice	57	(2)
2025–2026	ŁKS Łódź	12	(0)
2026	ŁKS Łódź II	11	(2)
2026–	Unia Skierniewice	1	(1)

International career
2014	Poland U17	1	(0)
2015	Poland U18	1	(0)
2016	Poland U19	2	(0)
- * Club domestic league appearances and goals as of 23:13, 6 November 2026 (UTC)

Miłosz Szczepański (born 22 March 1998) is a Polish professional footballer who plays as a midfielder for I liga club Unia Skierniewice.

== Honours ==
Legia Warsaw

- Polish Cup: 2017–18

Raków Częstochowa

- I liga: 2018–19
