= Constantin Reiner =

Austrian footballer

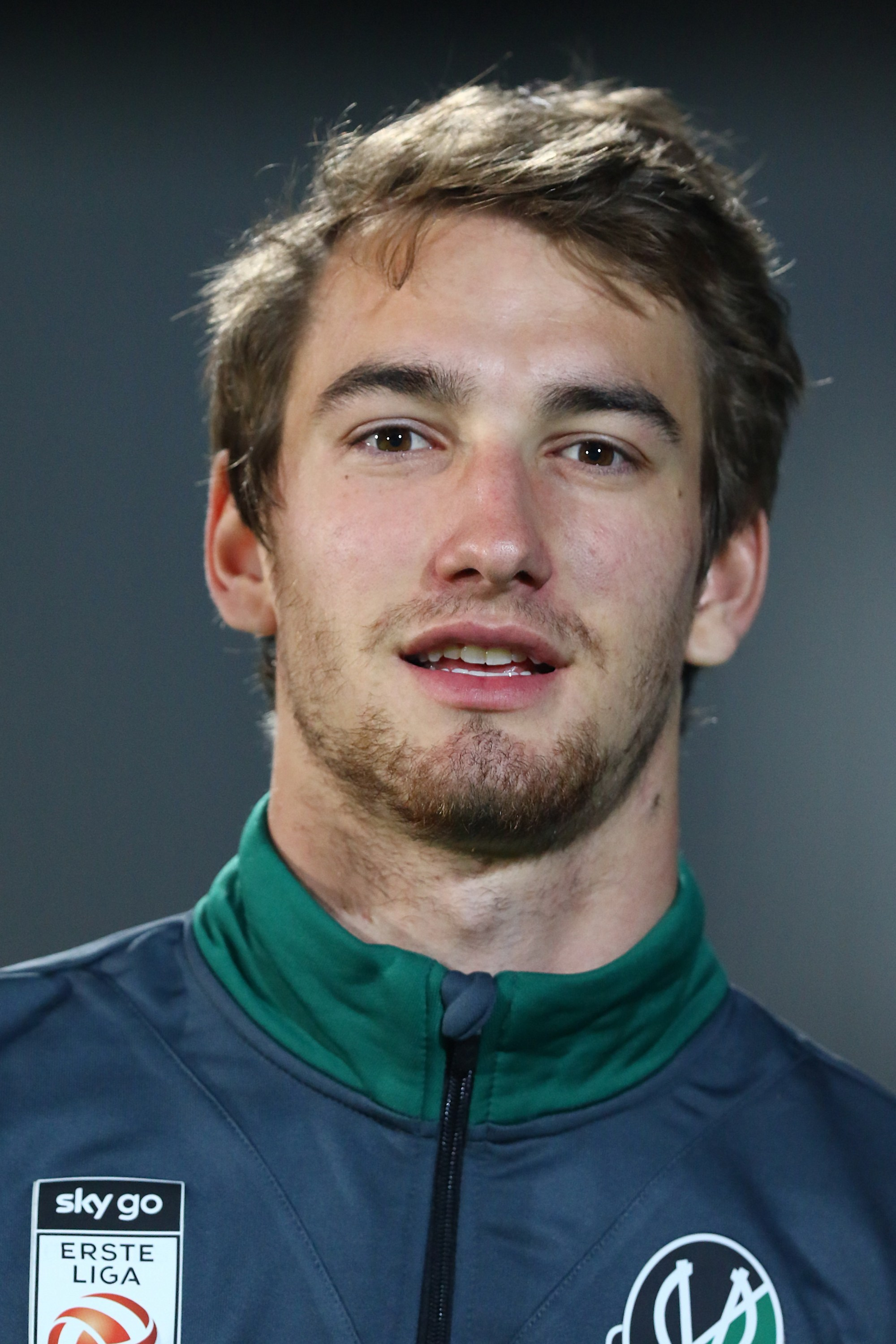

Personal information
- Full name: Constantin Simon Reiner
- Date of birth: 11 July 1997 (age 29)
- Place of birth: Oberndorf bei Salzburg, Austria
- Height: 1.96 m (6 ft 5 in)
- Position: Centre-back

Team information
- Current team: Changchun Yatai
- Number: 27

Youth career
- 2002–2006: USK Obertrum
- 2006–2014: Red Bull Salzburg

Senior career*
Years	Team	Apps	(Gls)
2014–2018	USK Anif	84	(3)
2018–2022	SV Ried	80	(5)
2022–2025	Piast Gliwice	18	(2)
2023–2024	→ Rheindorf Altach (loan)	23	(0)
2025	Shaanxi Union	27	(2)
2026–	Changchun Yatai	24	(1)
- * Club domestic league appearances and goals as of 7 November 2026

Constantin Simon Reiner (born 11 July 1997) is an Austrian professional footballer who plays as a centre-back for China League One side Changchun Yatai.

== Club career ==
For the 2023–24 season, Reiner joined Rheindorf Altach on loan with an option to buy.

On 18 February 2025, Reiner moved to Chinese second division club Shaanxi Union.

== Career statistics ==
As of match played 7 November 2026

Appearances and goals by club, season and competition
Club	Season	League			Cup		Continental		Other		Total	
Club	Season	Division	Apps	Goals	Apps	Goals	Apps	Goals	Apps	Goals	Apps	Goals
USK Anif	2014–15	Austrian Landesliga	20	2	—		—		—		20	2
USK Anif	2015–16	Austrian Regionalliga	26	0	—		—		—		26	0
USK Anif	2016–17	Austrian Regionalliga	22	1	—		—		—		26	1
USK Anif	2017–18	Austrian Regionalliga	16	0	2	1	—		—		18	1
USK Anif	Total		84	3	2	1	—		—		86	4
SV Ried	2017–18	2. Liga	2	0	0	0	—		—		2	0
SV Ried	2018–19	2. Liga	18	1	2	0	—		—		20	1
SV Ried	2019–20	2. Liga	21	0	2	0	—		—		23	0
SV Ried	2020–21	Austrian Bundesliga	23	2	2	0	—		—		25	2
SV Ried	2021–22	Austrian Bundesliga	16	2	2	1	—		—		18	3
SV Ried	Total		80	5	8	1	—		—		88	6
Piast Gliwice	2021–22	Ekstraklasa	6	0	1	0	—		—		7	0
Piast Gliwice	2022–23	Ekstraklasa	12	2	3	0	—		—		15	2
Piast Gliwice	Total		18	2	4	0	—		—		22	2
Rheindorf Altach (loan)	2023–24	Austrian Bundesliga	23	0	2	1	—		—		25	1
Shaanxi Union	2025	China League One	27	2	0	0	—		—		27	2
Changchun Yatai	2026	China League One	24	1	0	0	—		—		24	1
Career total			256	13	16	3	0	0	0	0	272	16
