= Grzegorz Tomasiewicz =

Polish footballer (born 1996)

Personal information
- Date of birth: 5 May 1996 (age 30)
- Place of birth: Jaworzno, Poland
- Height: 1.67 m (5 ft 6 in)
- Position: Midfielder

Team information
- Current team: Śląsk Wrocław
- Number: 20

Youth career
- Szczakowianka Jaworzno
- 2007–2009: MCKiS Sokół Jaworzno
- 2009–2011: Ruch Chorzów
- 2011–2013: Legia Warsaw

Senior career*
Years	Team	Apps	(Gls)
2013–2015	Legia Warsaw II	42	(10)
2015–2018	Arka Gdynia	18	(1)
2016–2018	→ Pogoń Siedlce (loan)	66	(10)
2018–2022	Stal Mielec	127	(19)
2022–2026	Piast Gliwice	128	(6)
2026–	Śląsk Wrocław	9	(1)

International career
2011	Poland U15	4	(3)
2012	Poland U16	7	(4)
2012–2013	Poland U17	10	(3)
2013–2014	Poland U18	10	(6)
2013–2015	Poland U19	14	(6)
2017	Poland U20	3	(1)
- * Club domestic league appearances and goals as of 00:12, 11 October 2026 (UTC)

Grzegorz Tomasiewicz (born 5 May 1996) is a Polish professional footballer who plays as a midfielder for Ekstraklasa club Śląsk Wrocław.

== Club career ==
=== Youth career ===
He started his career in Szczakowianka Jaworzno, then in 2007, he started playing in MCKiS Sokół Jaworzno. In 2009, he joined Ruch Chorzów's youth teams. In 2011, he moved to Legia Warsaw's academy, the final club of his youth career.

=== Legia Warsaw II ===
In August 2013, he started playing for Legia Warsaw II, where he debuted eleven days later in a 1–0 III liga win over GKS Bełchatów II. He scored his first goal for Legia II in a 0–1 away victory over Broń Radom on 31 October 2013.

=== Arka Gdynia ===
On 13 February 2015, his transfer to Arka was announced. He made his I liga debut for Arka Gdynia in a 0–1 away defeat to Bytovia Bytów on 9 May 2015. He recorded his first goal for the club in a 0–1 away win over Chojniczanka Chojnice on 2 November 2015. Arka finished the 2015–16 I liga as champions, and were promoted to the Ekstraklasa.

==== Loan to Pogoń Siedlce ====
On 13 July 2016, Tomasiewicz was loaned to Pogoń Siedlce. He debuted in a 3–0 Polish Cup win against Stilon Gorzów Wielkopolski, where he scored the first goal in Pogoń. Tomasiewicz made his first league appearance for Pogoń on 31 July 2016, in a 0–1 away win at GKS Tychy. He scored his first I liga goal for the club in a 2–1 victory over Chojniczanka Chojnice on 23 September 2016.

=== Piast Gliwice ===
In 2022, Tomasiewicz was transferred from Stal Mielec to Piast Gliwice.

=== Śląsk Wrocław ===
On 11 June 2026, newly promoted Śląsk Wrocław announced the signing of Tomasiewicz on a two-year deal, with an option for a further year.

== Honours ==
Arka Gdynia

- I liga: 2015–16

Stal Mielec

- I liga: 2019–20
