= Miguel Muñoz (footballer, born 1996) =

Spanish footballer

Personal information
- Full name: Miguel Muñoz Fernández
- Date of birth: 22 November 1996 (age 29)
- Place of birth: Madrid, Spain
- Height: 1.82 m (6 ft 0 in)
- Position: Centre-back

Team information
- Current team: Botoșani
- Number: 18

Youth career
- Rayo Vallecano
- 2014–2015: Deportivo La Coruña

Senior career*
Years	Team	Apps	(Gls)
2015–2016	Deportivo B	0	(0)
2016	→ Silva (loan)	18	(4)
2016–2017	Alavés B	21	(2)
2017–2018	SS Reyes	19	(0)
2018–2019	Unión Adarve	30	(2)
2020	SS Reyes	9	(1)
2020–2021	Murcia	21	(0)
2021–2025	Piast Gliwice	35	(0)
2025–	Botoșani	2	(0)
- * Club domestic league appearances and goals as of 30 November 2025

Miguel Muñoz Fernández (born 22 November 1996) is a Spanish professional footballer who plays as a centre-back for Liga I club Botoșani.

== Club career ==
Born in Madrid, Muñoz represented Rayo Vallecano and Deportivo de La Coruña as a youth. On 28 December 2015, he moved to Tercera División side Silva SD on loan for the remainder of the season.

In 2016, Muñoz moved to another reserve team, Deportivo Alavés B also in the fourth division. On 15 July of the following year, he signed a contract with Segunda División B team UD San Sebastián de los Reyes, but featured sparingly during the campaign.

On 12 July 2018, Muñoz moved to fellow third division side AD Unión Adarve, and was a regular starter as the club suffered relegation. He returned to Sanse on 4 January 2020, after six months without a club.

On 14 June 2020, Muñoz agreed to a one-year contract with Real Murcia, still in the third level. On 8 June of the following year, he moved abroad and joined Polish Ekstraklasa side Piast Gliwice on a two-year deal.

Muñoz made his debut for Piast on 12 September 2021, coming on as a late substitute for Ariel Mosór in a 0–1 home loss against Zagłębie Lubin.

== Honours ==
Alavés B

- Tercera División: 2016–17
