= Patryk Dziczek =

Polish footballer (born 1998)

Personal information
- Date of birth: 25 February 1998 (age 28)
- Place of birth: Gliwice, Poland
- Height: 1.82 m (6 ft 0 in)
- Position: Midfielder

Team information
- Current team: Pogoń Szczecin
- Number: 16

Youth career
- Piast Gliwice

Senior career*
Years	Team	Apps	(Gls)
2014–2016	Piast Gliwice II	50	(2)
2015–2019	Piast Gliwice	63	(4)
2019–2022	Lazio	0	(0)
2019–2021	→ Salernitana (loan)	35	(1)
2022–2026	Piast Gliwice	109	(15)
2026–	Pogoń Szczecin	0	(0)

International career
2014–2015	Poland U17	9	(0)
2015–2016	Poland U18	6	(0)
2015–2016	Poland U19	9	(0)
2017–2020	Poland U21	18	(1)
2023	Poland	2	(0)
- * Club domestic league appearances and goals as of 21:45, 29 May 2026 (UTC)

Patryk Dziczek (born 25 February 1998) is a Polish professional footballer who plays as a midfielder for Ekstraklasa club Pogoń Szczecin. Besides Poland, he has played in Italy.

== Club career ==
=== Lazio ===
On 23 August 2019, Dziczek signed with the Italian club Lazio.

==== Loan to Salernitana ====
On 28 August 2019, he was loaned to Salernitana in Serie B.

=== Return to Piast Gliwice ===
On 31 August 2022, Dziczek returned to Piast Gliwice and signed a three-year contract.

=== Pogoń Szczecin ===
On 7 January 2026, fellow Ekstraklasa club Pogoń Szczecin announced they had reached an agreement with Dziczek for him to join Pogoń on a three-year deal in July 2026, following the expiration of his contract with Piast.

== Career statistics ==
=== International ===
As of match played 15 October 2023

Appearances and goals by national team and year
National team	Year	Apps	Goals
Poland
Poland	2023	2	0
Total		2	0

== Honours ==
Piast Gliwice II

- Polish Cup (Zabrze regionals): 2014–15

Piast Gliwice

- Ekstraklasa: 2018–19

Individual

- Ekstraklasa Young Player of the Season: 2018–19
- Ekstraklasa Young Player of the Month: September 2018, May 2019
