= Michał Chrapek =

Polish footballer

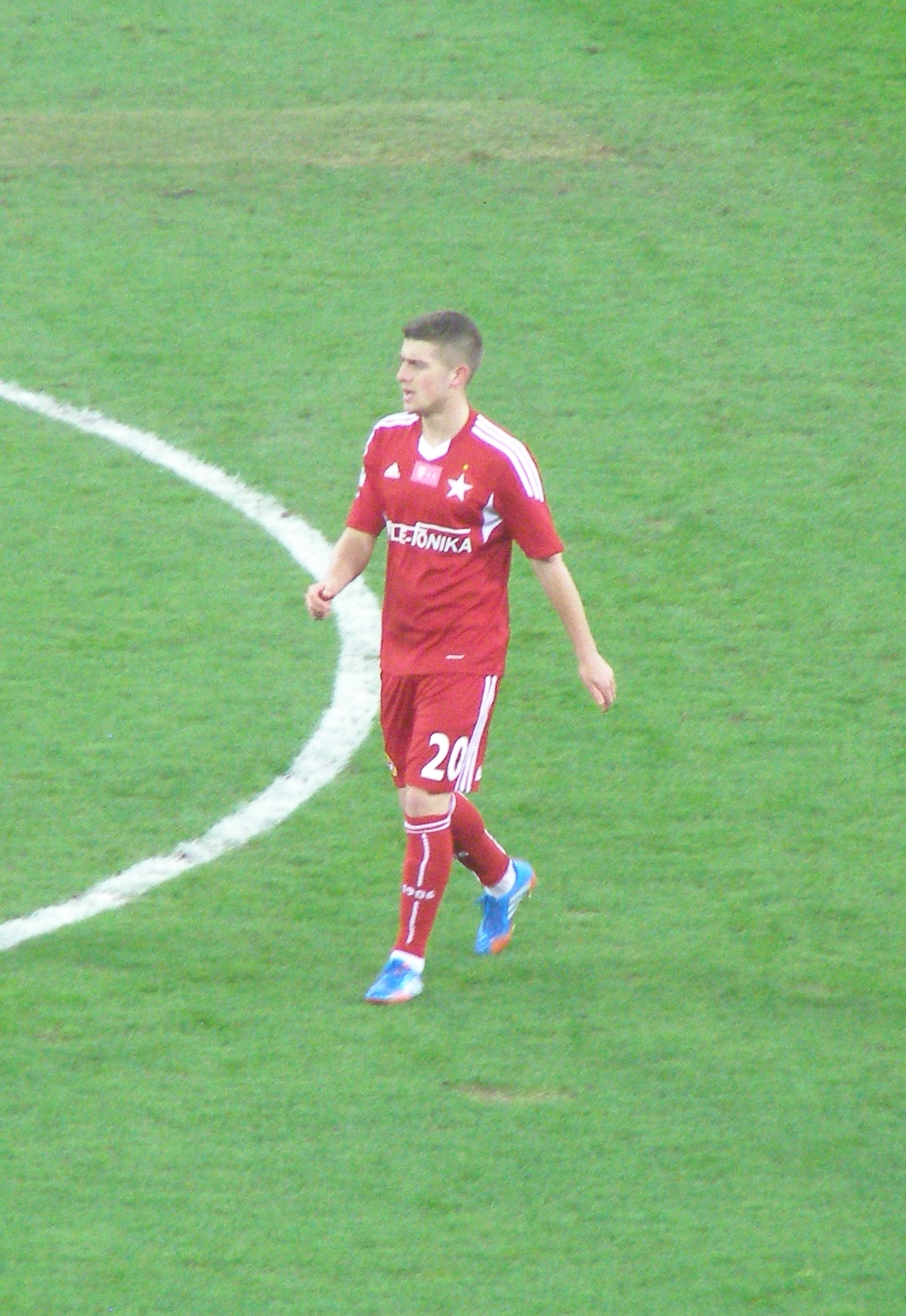
- Chrapek with Wisła Kraków in 2014

Personal information
- Date of birth: 3 April 1992 (age 34)
- Place of birth: Jaworzno, Poland
- Height: 1.77 m (5 ft 9 1/2 in)
- Position: Central midfielder

Team information
- Current team: Ruch Chorzów
- Number: 6

Youth career
- 2002–2006: Victoria Jaworzno
- 2007–2011: Wisła Kraków

Senior career*
Years	Team	Apps	(Gls)
2009–2011	Wisła Kraków (MESA)	53	(8)
2009–2014	Wisła Kraków	59	(7)
2011–2012	→ Kolejarz Stróże (loan)	30	(3)
2014–2015	Catania	21	(1)
2015–2017	Lechia Gdańsk	32	(1)
2015–2017	Lechia Gdańsk II	4	(0)
2017–2020	Śląsk Wrocław	88	(9)
2020–2026	Piast Gliwice	174	(19)
2026–	Ruch Chorzów	12	(2)

International career
2008–2009	Poland U17	13	(0)
2009–2010	Poland U18	7	(0)
2009–2010	Poland U19	4	(0)
2013	Poland U20	1	(0)
2012–2014	Poland U21	12	(2)
- * Club domestic league appearances and goals as of 15:04, 10 November 2026 (UTC)

Michał Chrapek (born 3 April 1992) is a Polish professional footballer who plays as a midfielder for I liga club Ruch Chorzów.

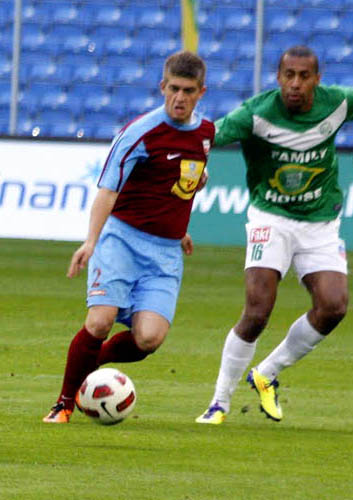
Michał Chrapek and Alain Ngamayama in 2011

== Club career ==
=== Early career ===
Chrapek started training football aged seven in community centre team at OPP Jaworzno. He played there as a right back for three years. Then he joined Victoria Jaworzno.

=== Wisła Kraków ===
In 2007, he moved to Wisła Kraków youth team. On 15 March 2009, he made his debut in Młoda Ekstraklasa team of Wisła. On 11 December 2009, he made his first team debut in the Ekstraklasa game against Zagłębie Lubin. In August 2011, he signed a one-year loan deal with Kolejarz Stróże, where he played in all 30 games of the 2011–12 season, scoring three goals.

=== Calcio Catania ===
On 12 June 2014, Chrapek moved to Italy and signed for Calcio Catania.

=== Lechia Gdańsk ===
After an unsuccessful year in Italy, he signed for Polish Ekstraklasa side Lechia Gdańsk.

=== Śląsk Wrocław ===
On 22 June 2017, he signed a contract with Śląsk Wrocław.

=== Piast Gliwice ===
On 10 October 2020, he joined Piast Gliwice.

=== Ruch Chorzów ===
On 9 June 2026, I liga side Ruch Chorzów announced the signing of Chrapek on a free transfer.

== International career ==
Chrapek has played internationally for Poland beginning with the under-17 level and up to the under-21 national team.

== Honours ==
Individual

- I liga Player of the Month: October 2026
