= Tihomir Kostadinov =

Macedonian professional footballer

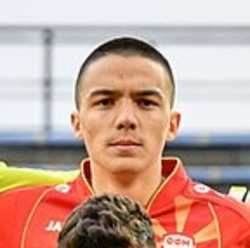
- Kostadinov with North Macedonia (U21) in 2018

Personal information
- Full name: Tihomir Kostadinov; Тихомир Костадинов
- Date of birth: 4 March 1996 (age 30)
- Place of birth: Valandovo, Macedonia
- Height: 1.80 m (5 ft 11 in)
- Position: Midfielder

Team information
- Current team: Slovácko (on loan from Sigma Olomouc)
- Number: 26

Senior career*
Years	Team	Apps	(Gls)
2013-2014	Tiverija	26	(1)
2014	Moravac Mrštane	7	(0)
2015	Teteks	8	(0)
2015–2016	Dukla Banská Bystrica	25	(4)
2016–2017	ViOn Zlaté Moravce	21	(1)
2017–2021	Ružomberok	109	(11)
2022–2025	Piast Gliwice	50	(2)
2025–	Sigma Olomouc	12	(0)
2026–	→ Slovácko (loan)	11	(0)

International career^{‡}
2012	Macedonia U17	2	(0)
2014	Macedonia U19	3	(0)
2015–2018	Macedonia U21	17	(4)
2019–	North Macedonia	38	(0)
- * Club domestic league appearances and goals as of 25 May 2026 ‡ National team caps and goals as of 8 October 2026

Tihomir Kostadinov (Macedonian: Тихомир Костадинов; born 4 March 1996) is a Macedonian professional footballer who plays as a midfielder for Czech First League club Slovácko on loan from Sigma Olomouc, and the North Macedonia national team.

== Club career ==
=== Moravac ===
Born in Macedonian town of Valandovo, Kostadinov made his professional debut by playing in neighboring Serbia, with Moravac Mrštane in the 2014–15 Serbian First League, Serbian second level.

=== ViOn Zlaté Moravce ===
Kostadinov made his Fortuna Liga debut for ViOn Zlaté Moravce in a 1–2 loss against Spartak Myjava on 16 July 2016. He debuted directly in the starting line-up.

=== Piast Gliwice ===
On 23 December 2021, Kostadinov was transferred to Polish club Piast Gliwice, signing a three-and-a-half-year contract. On 9 April that year, he suffered an ACL tear in his right knee during a 1–0 home win over Górnik Łęczna. He resumed playing in November 2023, and made his first appearance since his injury on 24 November in a goalless draw against Jagiellonia Białystok.

=== Sigma Olomouc ===
On 17 June 2025, Kostadinov moved on a free transfer to Czech club Sigma Olomouc.

==== Loan to Slovácko ====
On 12 February 2026, Kostadinov joined Slovácko on a half-year loan deal.

== International career ==
He made his senior debut for North Macedonia in a November 2019 European Championship qualification match against Austria.

He is part of the Macedonian group competing for UEFA Euro 2020. In this competition, he plays two group stage matches against Austria and the Netherlands.

== Career statistics ==
=== International ===
As of match played 6 October 2026

Appearances and goals by national team and year
National team	Year	Apps	Goals
North Macedonia
North Macedonia	2019	2	0
North Macedonia	2020	6	0
North Macedonia	2021	10	0
North Macedonia	2022	1	0
North Macedonia	2023	1	0
North Macedonia	2024	7	0
North Macedonia	2025	8	0
North Macedonia	2026	3	0
Total		38	0
