= Jakub Czerwiński =

Polish footballer

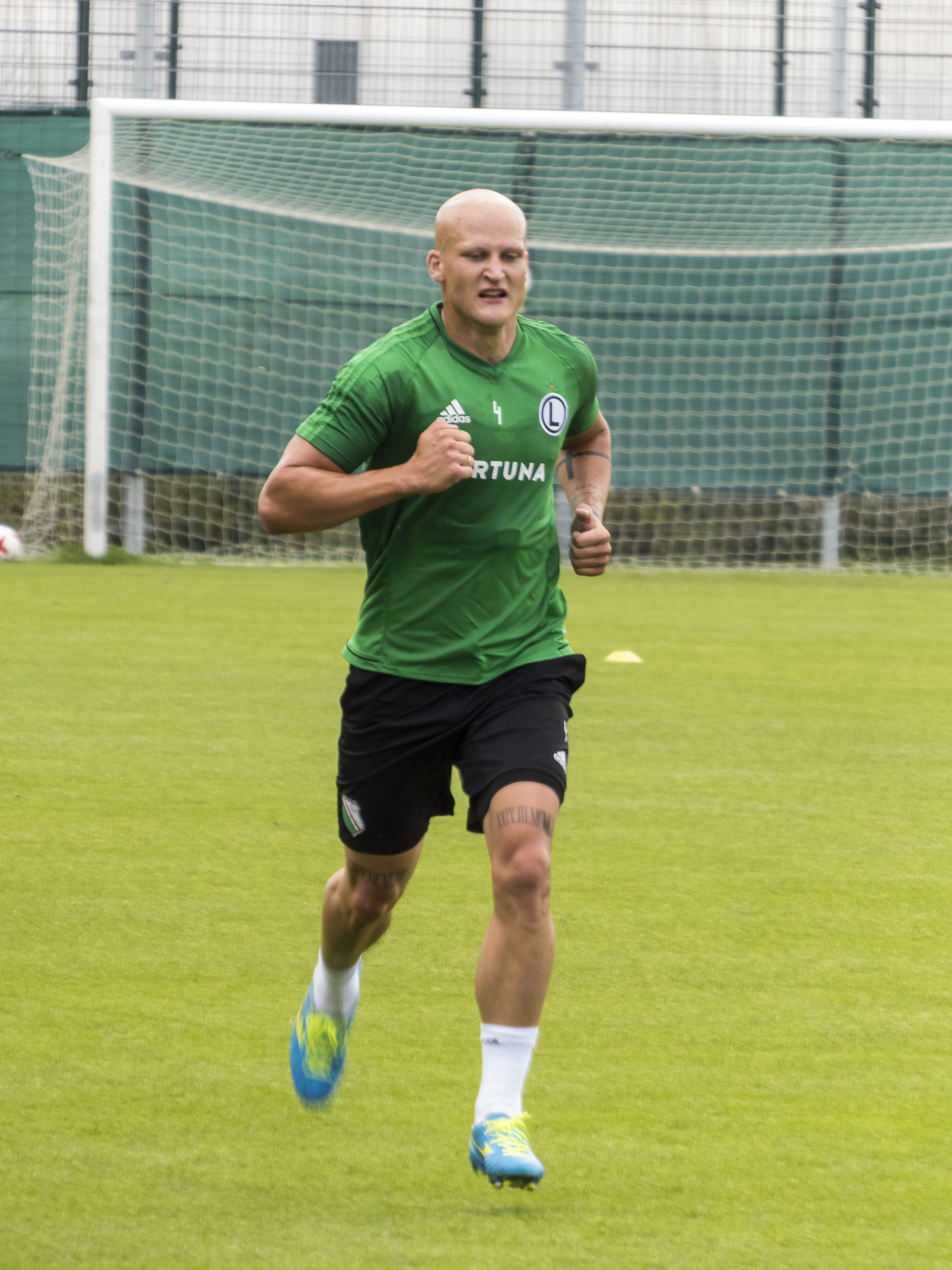
- Czerwiński with Legia Warsaw in 2017

Personal information
- Full name: Jakub Czerwiński
- Date of birth: 6 August 1991 (age 35)
- Place of birth: Krynica Zdrój, Poland
- Height: 1.83 m (6 ft 0 in)
- Position: Centre-back

Team information
- Current team: Piast Gliwice
- Number: 4

Youth career
- Poprad Muszyna
- Promień Opalenica

Senior career*
Years	Team	Apps	(Gls)
2008–2009	Promień Opalenica	25	(0)
2009–2011	Okocimski KS Brzesko	40	(3)
2011–2015	Termalica Bruk-Bet	116	(6)
2015–2016	Pogoń Szczecin	40	(1)
2016–2018	Legia Warsaw	12	(1)
2017–2018	→ Piast Gliwice (loan)	15	(1)
2018–	Piast Gliwice	231	(14)

International career
2010	Poland U19	1	(0)
- * Club domestic league appearances and goals as of 21:12, 25 October 2026 (UTC)

Jakub Czerwiński (born 6 August 1991) is a Polish professional footballer who plays as a centre-back for and captains Ekstraklasa club Piast Gliwice.

== Career statistics ==
As of match played 20 April 2026

Appearances and goals by club, season and competition
Club	Season	League			Polish Cup		Continental		Other		Total	
Club	Season	Division	Apps	Goals	Apps	Goals	Apps	Goals	Apps	Goals	Apps	Goals
Promień Opalenica	2008–09	III liga, gr. C	25	0	3	0	—		—		28	0
Okocimski KS Brzesko	2009–10	II liga East	15	0	2	0	—		—		17	0
Okocimski KS Brzesko	2010–11	II liga East	25	3	1	0	—		—		26	3
Okocimski KS Brzesko	Total		40	3	3	0	—		—		43	3
Bruk-Bet Termalica	2011–12	I liga	23	1	0	0	—		—		23	1
Bruk-Bet Termalica	2012–13	I liga	33	0	2	0	—		—		35	0
Bruk-Bet Termalica	2013–14	I liga	28	3	0	0	—		—		28	3
Bruk-Bet Termalica	2014–15	I liga	32	2	1	1	—		—		33	3
Bruk-Bet Termalica	Total		116	6	3	1	—		—		119	7
Pogoń Szczecin	2015–16	Ekstraklasa	33	1	1	0	—		—		34	1
Pogoń Szczecin	2016–17	Ekstraklasa	7	0	1	0	—		—		8	0
Pogoń Szczecin	Total		40	1	2	0	—		—		42	1
Legia Warsaw	2016–17	Ekstraklasa	8	1	0	0	4 (Note: Appearances in UEFA Champions League)	0	—		12	1
Legia Warsaw	2017–18	Ekstraklasa	4	0	2	0	1	1	0	0	7	1
Legia Warsaw	Total		12	1	2	0	5	1	0	0	19	2
Piast Gliwice (loan)	2017–18	Ekstraklasa	15	1	—		—		—		15	1
Piast Gliwice	2018–19	Ekstraklasa	36	3	1	0	—		—		37	3
Piast Gliwice	2019–20	Ekstraklasa	19	1	1	0	4 (Note: Two appearances and one goal in UEFA Champions League, two appearances and one goal in UEFA Europa League)	2	1 (Note: Appearance in Polish Super Cup)	0	25	3
Piast Gliwice	2020–21	Ekstraklasa	26	1	4	0	3 (Note: Appearances in UEFA Europa League)	0	—		33	1
Piast Gliwice	2021–22	Ekstraklasa	27	3	1	0	—		—		28	3
Piast Gliwice	2022–23	Ekstraklasa	33	1	2	0	—		—		35	1
Piast Gliwice	2023–24	Ekstraklasa	29	1	3	1	—		—		32	2
Piast Gliwice	2024–25	Ekstraklasa	30	2	4	0	—		—		34	2
Piast Gliwice	2025–26	Ekstraklasa	21	0	1	0	—		—		22	0
Piast Gliwice	Total		236	13	17	1	7	2	1	0	261	16
Career total			469	24	30	2	12	3	1	0	512	29

== Honours ==
Legia Warsaw

- Ekstraklasa: 2016–17, 2017–18
- Polish Cup: 2017–18

Piast Gliwice

- Ekstraklasa: 2018–19
