= Piotr Wieczorek Municipal Stadium =

Stadium in Gliwice, Poland

Coordinates: 50.3066°N 18.6959°E

- Piast Gliwice Stadium
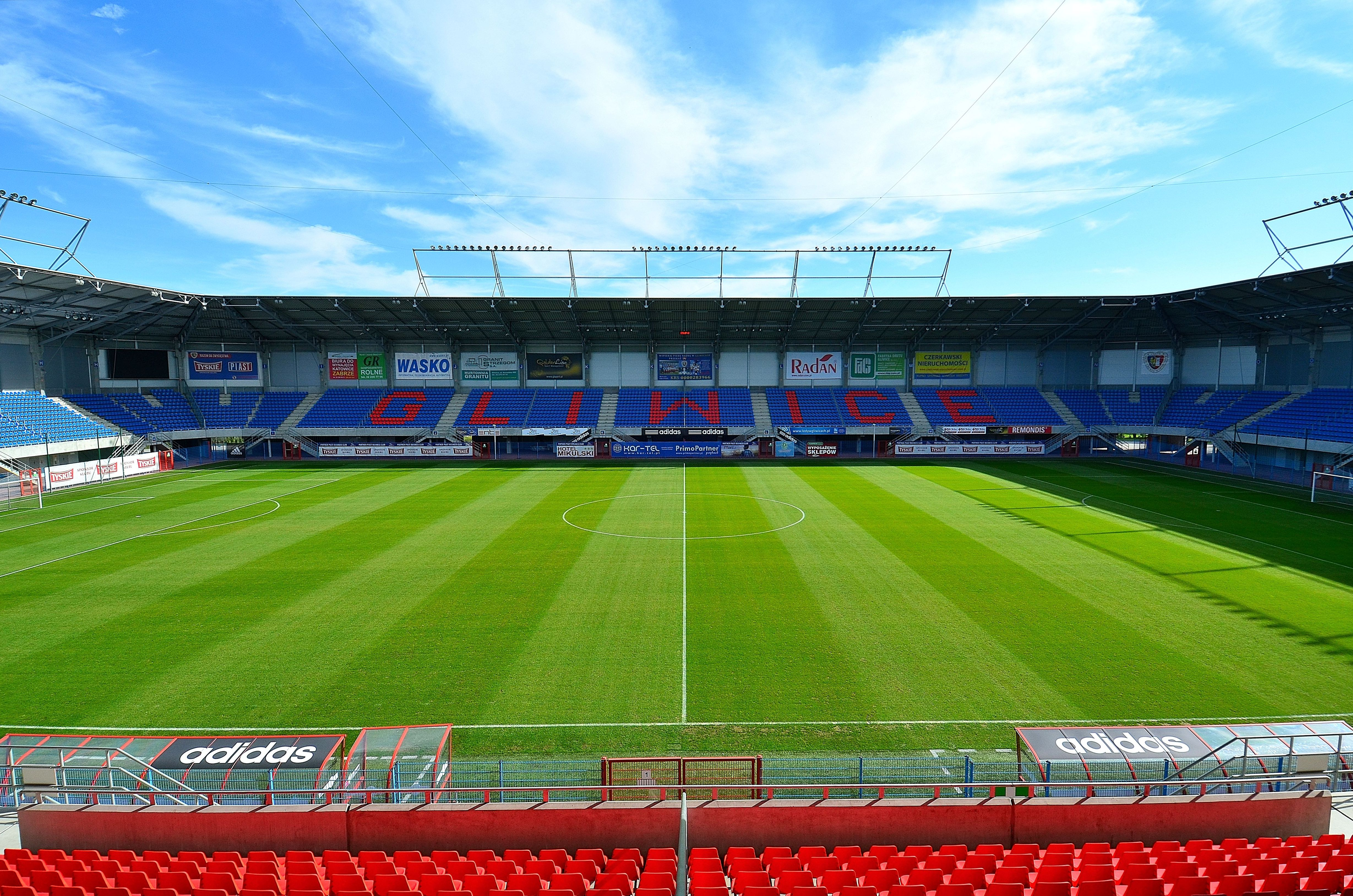
- Interactive map of Piotr Wieczorek Municipal Stadium
- Full name: Stadion Miejski im. Piotra Wieczorka w Gliwicach
- Location: Ulica Okrzei 20, 44-10 Gliwice, Poland
- Owner: City of Gliwice
- Operator: Piast Gliwice
- Capacity: 10,037
- Surface: grass
- Record attendance: 9,913 (Piast Gliwice - Lech Poznań, 19 May 2019)
- Field size: 105 m × 68 m (344 ft × 223 ft)

Construction
- Opened: Before 1926
- Renovated: 2010–2011
- Cost: PLN 54 137 254
- Architect: Bremer AG

Tenant
- Piast Gliwice (1956–present)

Website
- www.piast-gliwice.eu

The Piotr Wieczorek Municipal Stadium (Polish: Stadion Miejski im. Piotra Wieczorka), also known as the Piast Gliwice Stadium (Polish: Stadion Piasta Gliwice) is a football-specific stadium located in Gliwice, Poland. It is the home ground of Piast Gliwice. The stadium holds 10,037 spectators. The stadium underwent a complete reconstruction which took place from September 2010 to July 2011 including the building of four new fully covered and all-seated stands.

== Stadium history ==
The first sport venue in the present day stadium location was built in the mid-1920s. Certainly, the stadium already existed in 1926 but exact date of its construction is unknown. The stadium was modernized and rebuilt several times. Before the Second World War, the object was a home ground of SpVgg Vorwärts-Rasensport and in 1941 the stands could hold 15,000 spectators.

After Gliwice was placed under Polish administration in 1945, the stadium was used as a home ground of Budowlani Gliwice (also known as Lechia). In 1956, following the merger of three clubs located in Gliwice – GKS Gliwice has been formed. Meanwhile Piast played their matches on other stadium located at Robotnicza street. In the year 1964, the two clubs merged, resulting in the GKS "Piast" Gliwice has been established. Piast has been promoted to Polish Second League for the first time in history in 1957. Initially matches were played on stadium located at Robotnicza street but eventually the team moved to the present day stadium location at Okrzei street.

After the reactivation of the senior Piast Gliwice team in 1997, all league matches and cup were played on the stadium located at Okrzei street. In 2006 floodlights masts was installed on the stadium for the first time, which was inaugurated exactly on 21 July 2006. On this occasion, a friendly match between Piast and Pogoń Szczecin was played. In 2008, Piast Gliwice gained promotion to the Ekstraklasa for the first time in its history. The team was forced to playing their official matches at the MOSiR Stadium located in Wodzislaw Slaski, because stadium at Okrzei street does not meet Ekstraklasa licensing requirements. The first ever match in Ekstraklasa took place in Gliwice at April 3, 2009 when Piast won with its local rival – Górnik Zabrze 1:0.

== New stadium ==
In September 2010, construction of the current, new Piast stadium began. The old structures were completely demolished, and in the same place a new stadium was built. The stadium was designed by the German company Bremer AG. The whole structure is almost an exact copy of the German Benteler-Arena (previously known as Energieteam Arena), which is a home ground of SC Paderborn 07. The general contractor of the stadium was Polimex-Mostostal. The cost of construction was 54 137 254 PLN. (about 13 mln €).

The first official football event on the new Piast Stadium took place on November 5, 2011. An inaugural match between Piast Gliwice and Wisła Płock took place then. Piast won the match by 2–1 and the first player to score a goal was Ricardo Cavalcante Mendes.

== Stadium patron ==
From 2019, the stadium is named after Piotr Wieczorek (1963–2019), former vice-president of Gliwice, who contributed to the reconstruction of Piast Gliwice and was responsible for many large projects in the city.
