= Piast Gliwice =

Coordinates: 50°18′23.69″N 18°41′45.42″E

- Full name: Gliwicki Klub Sportowy Piast
- Nicknames: Piastunki (the Custodians, the Keepers)
- Founded: 18 June 1945; 81 years ago
- Ground: Piotr Wieczorek Stadium
- Capacity: 9,913
- Chairman: Mariusz Siewierski
- Manager: Daniel Myśliwiec
- League: Ekstraklasa
- 2025–26: Ekstraklasa, 15th of 18
- Website: www.piast-gliwice.eu
Home colours	Away colours

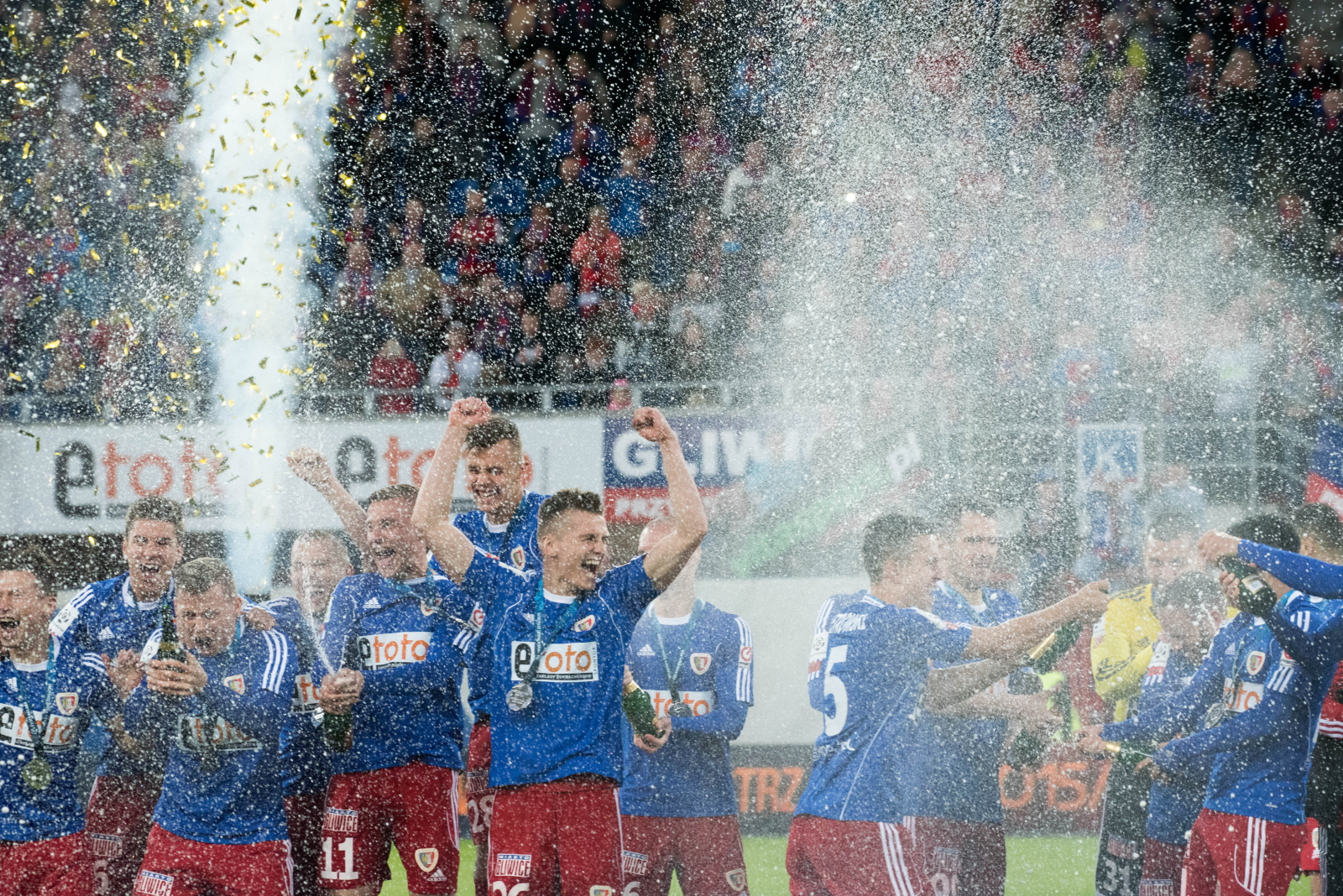
Piast Gliwice Polish runners-up celebration in 2016

Gliwicki Klub Sportowy Piast (pronounced [ɡliˈvit͡skʲi klup spɔrˈtɔvɨ pjazd] (Note: In isolation, Piast is pronounced [pjast])), commonly referred to as Piast Gliwice, is a Polish professional football club based in Gliwice, Silesian Voivodeship. Founded in 1945, the club competes in the Ekstraklasa, the top tier of the Polish football league system.

Piast won their first national championship in the 2018–19 Ekstraklasa season and have regularly qualified for European competitions since. Prior to their rise in the 2010s, the club had spent most of its history in the lower divisions.

Piast Gliwice play their home matches at the Piotr Wieczorek Stadium, a 10,000-seat venue opened in 2011, and traditionally wear blue and red.

== History ==
The club was founded in June 1945 by the Poles who had been forced to leave their homes in former eastern Poland annexed by the Soviet Union (present-day Ukraine). The club's name comes from the Piast dynasty, which ruled Poland from its beginnings as an independent state in the 10th century, until 1370, and in the city itself until 1532.

In 1949, five local teams were merged with Piast, and the team was renamed to Metal Piast Gliwice, and then to Stal Gliwice, before its original name Piast Gliwice was restored in 1955. Piast continued to play their matches on ul. Robotniczej. In 1964, Piast merged with GKS Gliwice, a team formed in 1956 from a fusion of the three other local clubs, and the name was changed to GKS Piast Gliwice. Since the 1950s, Piast mostly played in the Second Division. During that period, Piast have twice (1978, 1983) managed to reach the final of the Polish Cup, losing on both occasions.

In the 1990s, due to financial difficulties, the team was rebuilt from the Klasa B (7th tier), achieving four consecutive promotions from the seventh to the third tier in 1997–2001, and afterwards it won promotion to the II liga (second tier) in 2003. Piast played as many as 33 seasons in the Polish Second Division, before finally being promoted to the Ekstraklasa in 2008. Having played two seasons in the top division, the club was relegated in 2010 to come back in 2012. It is the first football team in Poland to gain promotion from the 7th tier to the Ekstraklasa (Polish top tier of football) and later to the European club competition.

In the 2010s, Piast enjoyed its greatest success, being runners-up in the 2015–16 Ekstraklasa and winning its first Polish championship in the 2018–19 season.

There is also a futsal department of Piast Gliwice, which competes in the Futsal Ekstraklasa (top division). Its home venue is the Gliwice Arena. It won its first Polish Championship in the 2021–22 season.

=== Naming history ===
- 18 June 1945 – KS Piast Gliwice
- 23 May 1946 – KSM Piast Gliwice
- September/November 1947 – ZKSM Piast Gliwice
- 5 March 1949 – ZS Metal Piast Gliwice (merged with ZKSM Huta Łabędy, ZKS Walcownia Łabędy, RKS Jedność Rudziniec, RKS PZS Gliwice and ZKS Silesia Gliwice)
- 1 November 1949 – ZKS Stal Gliwice
- 11 March 1951 – ZKS Stal GZUT Gliwice
- 15 March 1955 – ZKS Piast Gliwice
- 20 January 1957 – KS Piast Gliwice
- 1 January 1961 – SKS Piast Gliwice
- 15 March 1964 – GKS Piast Gliwice (merged with GKS Gliwice and KS Metal Gliwice)
- 17 October 1983 – MC-W GKS Piast Gliwice
- 12 September 1989 – CWKS Piast-Bumar Gliwice
- 1989 – merged with ZTS Łabędy (Gliwice)
- 1990 – CWKS Bumar-Piast Gliwice
- 4 April 1990 – KS Bumar Gliwice
- 11 May 1990 – KS Bumar Łabędy (Gliwice)
- 1 July 1990 – KS Bumar Gliwice
- 1991 – KS Piast-Bumar Gliwice
- 1 July 1992 – MC-W GKS Piast Gliwice
- 1 August 1995 – KS Bojków Gliwice (merged with KS Bojków Gliwice)
- 15 September 1995 – KS Piast Bojków Gliwice
- 2 September 1996 – GKS Piast Gliwice

== Crest ==
Gliwice city coat of arms from which the club crest is derived

The club's crest is derived from the coat of arms of the city of Gliwice, and thus contains the Piast Eagle of the Upper Silesian line of the medieval Polish Piast dynasty, which ruled the city until 1532.

== Honours ==
- Ekstraklasa
  - Champions: 2018–19
  - Runners-up: 2015–16
  - Third place: 2019–20
- I liga
  - Champions: 2011–12
- Polish Cup
  - Runners-up: 1977–78, 1982–83

=== Seasons ===
- Seasons in Ekstraklasa: 14 (2008–10, 2012–)
- Seasons in I liga: 35
- Seasons in II liga: 16
- Seasons in III liga: 23

== European record ==
=== Results ===
Season	Competition	Round	Club	Home	Away	Aggregate
2013–14	UEFA Europa League	2Q	(Azerbaijan) Qarabağ FK	2–2	1–2	3–4 (a.e.t.)
2016–17	UEFA Europa League	2Q	(Sweden) IFK Göteborg	0–3	0–0	0–3
2019–20	UEFA Champions League	1Q	(Belarus) BATE Borisov	1−2	1−1	2−3
2019–20	UEFA Europa League	2Q	(Latvia) Riga FC	3−2	1−2	4−4
2020–21	UEFA Europa League	1Q	(Belarus) Dinamo Minsk	—N/a	2−0	—N/a
2020–21	UEFA Europa League	2Q	(Austria) Hartberg	3–2	—N/a	—N/a
2020–21	UEFA Europa League	3Q	(Denmark) Copenhagen	—N/a	0−3	—N/a

Notes

- 1Q: First qualifying round
- 2Q: Second qualifying round
- 3Q: Third qualifying round

== Stadium ==
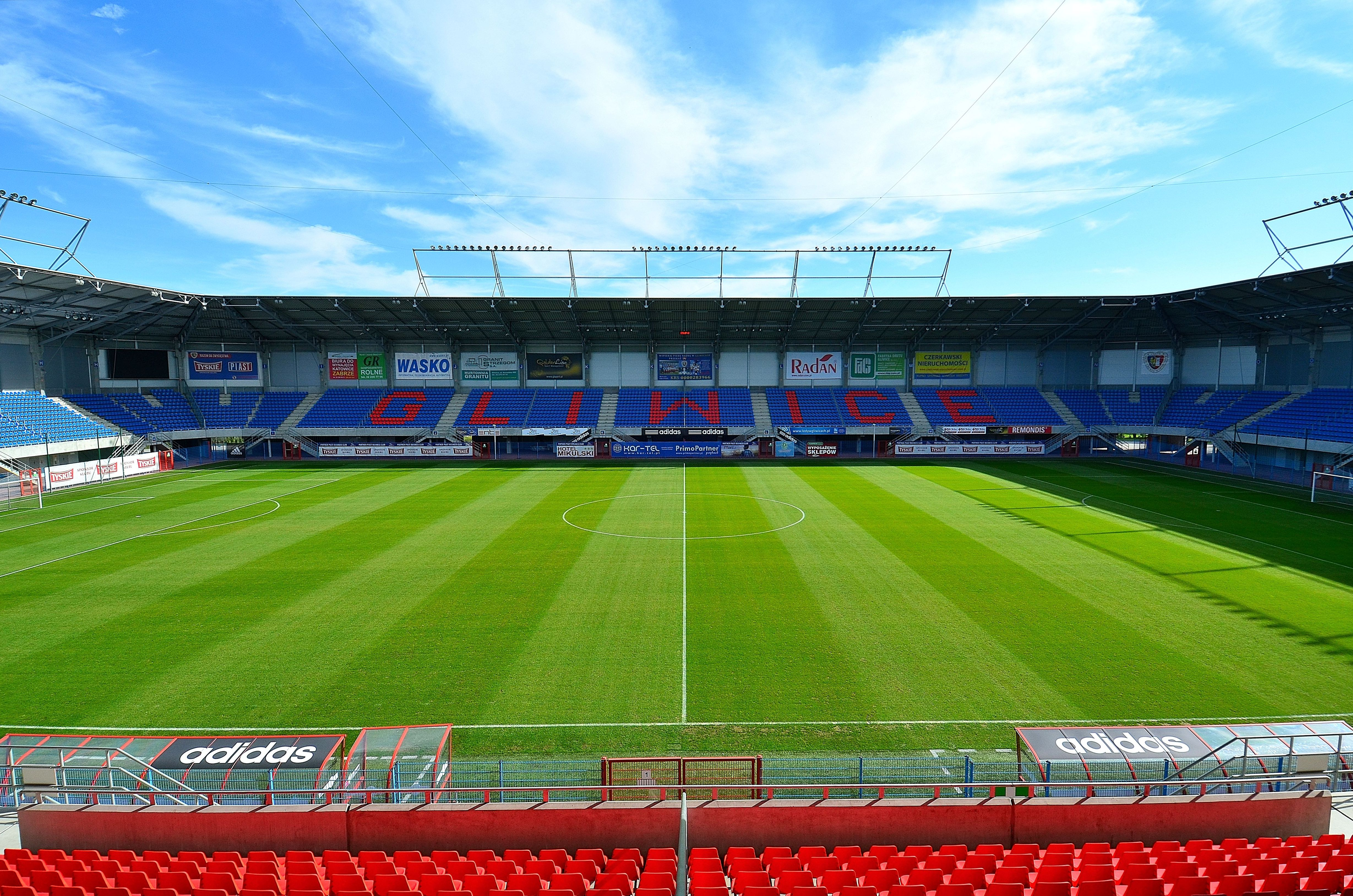
Piotr Wieczorek Stadium

Piast plays their home games at the 10,000 capacity Piotr Wieczorek Stadium in Gliwice.

== Supporters ==
Piast have a friendship with fans of Belarusian club BATE Borisov since 2011. The friendship started when BATE fans on their way to a Champions League match in Copenhagen stopped for a Piast game against local rivals GKS Katowice. The Piast fans then went to Alkmaar to support BATE versus AZ. After another visit for a Champions League game against Sturm Graz, the friendship became official and both sets of fans regularly visit each other.

Piast's major rivals are Górnik Zabrze, with whom they contest the local derby. The stadiums are located just a few kilometres from each other. Other rivals are local teams GKS Katowice and the two Bytom clubs, Szombierki and Polonia.

== Players ==
=== Current squad ===
As of 15 September 2026

Note: Flags indicate national team as defined under FIFA eligibility rules; some limited exceptions apply. Players may hold more than one non-FIFA nationality.

No.	Pos.	Nation	Player
3	DF	ALB	Elton Fikaj
4	DF	POL	Jakub Czerwiński (captain)
5	DF	ESP	Juande
7	MF	ESP	Jorge Félix
10	FW	CYP	Andreas Katsantonis
11	MF	POR	Leandro Sanca
12	GK	POL	Marcel Mendes-Dudziński
15	DF	POL	Levis Pitan
17	MF	FRA	Quentin Boisgard
18	MF	POL	Oliwier Maziarz
19	FW	FRA	Samuel Ntamack
22	DF	CHI	Francisco Sierralta (on loan from Auxerre)
26	GK	SVK	František Plach

No.	Pos.	Nation	Player
27	MF	POL	Jakub Łabojko
28	DF	POL	Filip Borowski
31	DF	POL	Oskar Leśniak
36	DF	POL	Jakub Lewicki
47	GK	POL	Jakub Grelich
75	GK	SLO	Domen Gril
77	MF	POL	Szczepan Mucha
80	MF	ESP	Hugo Vallejo
90	MF	POR	Ivan Lima
91	FW	POL	Maciej Kucharski
98	MF	COD	Jason Lokilo
99	DF	GHA	Ema Twumasi

=== Retired numbers ===
Note: Flags indicate national team as defined under FIFA eligibility rules; some limited exceptions apply. Players may hold more than one non-FIFA nationality.

No.	Pos.	Nation	Player
21	MF	ESP	Gerard Badía (2014–21)

=== Notable players ===
Had international caps for their respective countries at any time. Players with names listed in bold represented their countries while playing for Piast.

Algeria

- (Algeria) Akim Zedadka

Barbados

- (Barbados) Thierry Gale

Belarus

- (Belarus) **German Barkovsky**

Bosnia and Herzegovina

- (Bosnia and Herzegovina) Stojan Vranješ

Chile

- (Chile) Francisco Sierralta

Cyprus

- (Cyprus) Andreas Katsantonis

Czech Republic

- (Czech Republic) Michal Papadopulos
- (Czech Republic) **Kamil Vacek**

Estonia

- (Estonia) **Rauno Sappinen**
- (Estonia) **Konstantin Vassiljev**

Georgia

- (Georgia (country)) Valerian Gvilia

Latvia

- (Latvia) **Artūrs Karašausks**
- (Latvia) **Artis Lazdiņš**

Lithuania

- (Lithuania) **Edvinas Girdvainis**
- (Lithuania) Gediminas Paulauskas

Netherlands

- (Netherlands) Collins John

North Macedonia

- (North Macedonia) **Tihomir Kostadinov**

Poland

- (Poland) Michael Ameyaw
- (Poland) Piotr Brożek
- (Poland) Lucjan Brychczy
- (Poland) Andrzej Buncol
- (Poland) **Patryk Dziczek**
- (Poland) **Kamil Glik**
- (Poland) Tomasz Jodłowiec
- (Poland) Damian Kądzior
- (Poland) Rafał Leszczyński
- (Poland) Igor Lewczuk
- (Poland) Rafał Pietrzak
- (Poland) Arkadiusz Pyrka
- (Poland) Marcin Robak
- (Poland) Bartosz Rymaniak
- (Poland) **Jakub Świerczok**
- (Poland) Kamil Wilczek
- (Poland) Michał Żyro

Serbia

- (Serbia) Aleksandar Sedlar
- (Serbia) Nikola Stojiljković

Slovakia

- (Slovakia) **Martin Bukata**
- (Slovakia) Dominik Holec
- (Slovakia) **Jakub Holúbek**
- (Slovakia) Csaba Horváth
- (Slovakia) Tomáš Huk
- (Slovakia) Erik Jirka
- (Slovakia) **František Plach**
- (Slovakia) Rudolf Urban

Slovenia

- (Slovenia) Saša Živec

== Managers ==
- (Poland) Kazimierz Gontarewicz (1 June 1997 – 23 April 2001)
- (Poland) Fryderyk Cholewa (23 April 2001 – 4 July 2001)
- (Poland) Marek Majka (4 July 2001 – 23 August 2001)
- (Poland) Marcin Bochynek (23 August 2001 – 16 December 2001)
- (Poland) Krzysztof Zagórski (16 December 2001 – 23 October 2002)
- (Poland) Józef Dankowski (21 April 2003 – 19 October 2004)
- (Poland) Wojciech Borecki (19 October 2004 – 31 December 2004)
- (Poland) Jacek Zieliński (31 December 2004 – 14 September 2006)
- (Poland) Jan Furlepa (caretaker) (14–20 September 2006)
- (Poland) Bogusław Pietrzak (20 September 2006 – 30 June 2007)
- (Poland) Piotr Mandrysz (3 July 2007 – 30 June 2008)
- (Poland) Marek Wlecialowski (1 July 2008 – 5 January 2009)
- (Poland) Dariusz Fornalak (5 January 2009 – 15 March 2010)
- (Poland) Ryszard Wieczorek (15 March 2010 – 9 June 2010)
- (Poland) Marcin Brosz (15 June 2010 – 6 May 2014)
- (Spain) Ángel García (7 May 2014 – 18 March 2015)
- (Czech Republic) Radoslav Látal (20 March 2015 – 15 July 2016)
- (Czech Republic) Jiří Neček (15 July 2016 – 31 August 2016)
- (Czech Republic) Radoslav Látal (1 September 2016 – 2 March 2017)
- (Poland) Dariusz Wdowczyk (3 March 2017 – 19 September 2017)
- (Poland) Waldemar Fornalik (19 September 2017 – 25 October 2022)
- (Serbia) Aleksandar Vuković (27 October 2022 – 30 June 2025)
- (Sweden) Max Mölder (1 July 2025 – 23 October 2025)
- (Poland) Daniel Myśliwiec (23 October 2025 – present)

== See also ==
- Football in Poland
