= 2024–25 GKS Katowice season =

GKS Katowice
2024–25 season
- Manager: Rafał Górak
- Stadium: GKS Katowice Stadium
- Ekstraklasa: 8th
- Polish Cup: Round of 32
Home colours	Away colours	Third colours

The 2024–25 season was the 61st season in the history of GKS Katowice and its first in the Polish top flight, known as the Ekstraklasa in 19 years. The club finished 8th in the league and also participated in the Polish Cup, where they were eliminated in the round of 32.

== Transfers ==
=== In ===
Pos.	Player	Transferred from	Fee	Date	Source
MF	(Poland) Mateusz Kowalczyk	(Denmark) Brøndby IF	Loan	17 July 2024	
MF	(Poland) Bartosz Nowak	(Poland) Raków Częstochowa	Undisclosed	23 July 2024	
GK	(Poland) Rafał Strączek	(France) Bordeaux	Undisclosed	24 July 2024	

=== Out ===
Pos.	Player	Transferred to	Fee	Date	Source
MF	(Ecuador) Christian Alemán		End of contract	1 July 2024	

== Friendlies ==
=== Pre-season ===
22 June 2024 Friendly	Widzew Łódź	3–1	GKS Katowice	Łódź
12:00				Stadium: Widzew Łódź Stadium

26 June 2024 Friendly	GKS Katowice	0–2	Polonia Bytom	Ustroń
11:00			Kamil Wojtyra 31'; Dawid Zagórski 66'	Stadium: stadion Kuźni

26 June 2024 Friendly	GKS Jastrzębie	2–2	GKS Katowice	Ustroń
17:00				Stadium: stadion Kuźni

30 June 2024 Friendly	GKS Katowice	1–3	Hutnik Kraków	Ustroń
11:00				Stadium: stadion Kuźni; Referee: Mateusz Piszczelok

6 July 2024 Friendly	GKS Katowice	2–0	Odra Opole	Katowice
11:00	Bergier 75'; Krawczyk 80'			Stadium: GKS Katowice Stadium

13 July 2024 Friendly	Zagłębie Lubin	1–1	GKS Katowice	Lubin
15:30	Sejk 58'		Arak 85'	Stadium: Lubin Stadium

21 July 2024 Friendly	GKS Katowice	3–1	Unia Turza Śląska
11:00

=== Mid-season ===
14 January 2025 Friendly	GKS Katowice	1–1	Železničar	Katowice
13:00	Jakub Kokosinski 90'	Report	Djakaridja Junior Traoré 50'	Stadium: Arena Katowice

21 January 2025 Friendly	GKS Katowice	4–3	Veres Rivne	Katowice
14:00	Borja Galán 37' 42'; Bartosz Jaroszek 67'; Komor 88'	Report	Marko Mrvaljević 29'; Dmytro Hodya 49'; Stepanyuk 54'	Stadium: Arena Katowice

24 January 2025 Friendly	GKS Katowice	1–0	Arda Kardzhali	Katowice
13:00	Nowak 76'	Report		Stadium: Arena Katowice

1 February 2025 Friendly	GKS Katowice	2–2	Podbeskidzie	Katowice
11:00	Marzec 19' 50'	Report	Górski 27'; Bartosz Florek 28'	Stadium: Arena Katowice

== Competitions ==
=== Overall record ===
Competition	First match	Last match	Starting round	Record							
Competition	First match	Last match	Starting round	Pld	W	D	L	GF	GA	GD	Win %
Ekstraklasa	20 July 2024	24–25 May 2025	Matchday 1	3	1	0	2	2	3	−1	33.33
Polish Cup				0	0	0	0	0	0	+0	—
Total				3	1	0	2	2	3	−1	33.33

Last updated: 3 August 2024
Source: Soccerway

=== Ekstraklasa ===
==== League table ====
Pos	Team	Pld	W	D	L	GF	GA	GD	Pts
6	Cracovia	34	14	9	11	58	53	+5	51
7	Motor Lublin	34	14	7	13	48	59	−11	49 (Note: Ranked based on head-to-head points: Motor Lublin 4 pts, GKS Katowice - 1 pt.)
8	GKS Katowice	34	14	7	13	49	47	+2	49
9	Górnik Zabrze	34	13	8	13	43	39	+4	47
10	Piast Gliwice	34	11	12	11	37	36	+1	45 (Note: Ranked based on head-to-head points: Piast Gliwice 4 pts, Korona Kielce - 1 pt.)

Source: ekstraklasa.org 90minut.pl
Rules for classification: 1) Points; 2) Head-to-head points; 3) Head-to-head goal difference; 4) Goal difference; 5) Goals scored; 6) Number of wins; 7) Number of away wins; 8) Lower number of points based on yellow and red cards (red card = 3 points, yellow card = 1 point, sending-off = 3 points - including 1 point for first yellow card); 9) Fairplay ranking; 10) Draw.
(Note: Head-to-head record is used only after all the matches between the teams in question have been played)

==== Results summary ====
Overall								Home						Away					
Pld	W	D	L	GF	GA	GD	Pts	W	D	L	GF	GA	GD	W	D	L	GF	GA	GD
34	14	7	13	49	47	+2	49	8	5	4	24	17	+7	6	2	9	25	30	−5

Last updated: 24 May 2025.

==== Results by round ====
Round	1	2	3	4	5	6	7	8	9	10	11	12	13	14	15	16	17	18	19	20	21	22	23	24	25	26	27	28	29	30	31	32	33	34
Ground	H	A	H	A	H	H	A	H	A	H	A	H	A	H	A	A	H	A	H	A	H	A	A	H	A	H	A	H	A	H	A	H	H	A
Result	L	W	L	D	D	W	L	D	L	W	W	D	L	L	W	L	W	D	W	W	D	L	L	W	L	W	L	W	W	L	L	W	D	W
Position	13	10	13	12	12	9	10	9	11	11	8	9	10	12	11	11	9	10	9	8	8	9	10	9	9	9	9	9	8	9	10	8	8	8

Updated to match(es) played on 24 May 2025. Source:
A = Away; H = Home; W = Win; D = Draw; L = Loss

==== Matches ====
20 July 2024 1	GKS Katowice	1–2	Radomiak Radom	Katowice
14:45	Repka (yellow card) 65'; Marzec 83'		Leonardo Rocha 24', 37', (yellow card) 90+4'; Vagner (yellow card) 53'; Grzesik (yellow card) 54'; Jordão (yellow card) 82'; Peglow (yellow card) 89'	Stadium: GKS Katowice Stadium; Attendance: 6,720; Referee: Paweł Raczkowski

27 July 2024 2	Stal Mielec	0–1	GKS Katowice	Mielec
14:45			Jędrych 31' (pen.)	Stadium: Mielec Stadium; Referee: Łukasz Kuźma

3 August 2024 3	GKS Katowice	0–1	Raków Częstochowa	Katowice
14:45			Jean Carlos 29'	Stadium: GKS Katowice Stadium; Referee: Bartosz Frankowski

12 August 2024 4	Piast Gliwice	2–2	GKS Katowice	Gliwice
19:00 CEST	Ameyaw 31'; Czerwiński (yellow card) 41'; Chrapek 49'	Report	Zreľák 19' 68' (yellow card) 81'	Stadium: Piast Gliwice Stadium; Attendance: 7,805; Referee: (Poland) Tomasz Kwiatkowski

16 August 2024 5	GKS Katowice	0–0	Motor Lublin	Katowice
20:30 CEST	Grzegorz Rogala (yellow card) 12'; Borja Galán (yellow card) 65'; Kuusk (yellow card) 84'	Report	Kubica (yellow card) 45+4'; Bartoš (yellow card) 89'	Stadium: GKS Katowice Stadium; Attendance: 6,684; Referee: (Poland) Patryk Gryckiewicz

25 August 2024 6	GKS Katowice	3–1	Jagiellonia Białystok	Katowice
14:45 CEST	Błąd 2'; Kowalczyk (yellow card) 65' (goal) 73'; Zreľák (yellow card) 76'; Repka 90+7'	Report	Afimico Pululu 18'; Diaby-Fadiga (yellow card) 58'	Stadium: GKS Katowice Stadium; Attendance: 6,690; Referee: (Poland) Daniel Stefański

31 August 2024 7	Zagłębie Lubin	1–0	GKS Katowice	Lubin
17:30 CEST	Adamczyk 87'; Dąbrowski (yellow card) 90+2'	Report		Stadium: Lubin Stadium; Attendance: 5,753; Referee: (Poland) Wojciech Myć

13 September 2024 8	GKS Katowice	2–2	Widzew Łódź	Katowice
20:30 CEST	Wasielewski (yellow card) 31' (goal) 42'; Repka 38'; Czerwiński (yellow card) 82'	Report	Rondić 13'; Kozlovský (yellow card) 15'; Juan Ibiza (yellow card) 28'; Hamulić (yellow card) 85'; Łukowski 90+2'	Stadium: GKS Katowice Stadium; Attendance: 6,756; Referee: (Poland) Paweł Raczkowski

21 September 2024 9	Górnik Zabrze	3–0	GKS Katowice	Zabrze
20:15 CEST	Podolski 4' 64'; Lukoszek (yellow card) 39'; Josema 48'	Report	Komor (yellow card) 90+2'	Stadium: Arena Zabrze; Attendance: 22,371; Referee: (Poland) Daniel Stefański

27 September 2024 10	GKS Katowice	3–1	Pogoń Szczecin	Katowice
18:00 CEST	Jędrych 33'; Błąd (yellow card) 53'; Bergier (yellow card) 85' (goal) 90'; Marzec 90+6'	Report	Cojocaru (yellow card) 54'; Olaf Igor Korczakowski (yellow card) 76'; Léo Borges (yellow card) 87'; Gorgon 90+3'	Stadium: GKS Katowice Stadium; Attendance: 6,759; Referee: (Poland) Paweł Raczkowski

4 October 2024 11	Puszcza Niepołomice	0–6	GKS Katowice	Niepołomice
18:00 CET		Report	Kowalczyk 31'; Bergier 41'; Repka 57'; Klemenz (yellow card) 68'; Jędrych 73' (pen.); Nowak 77' (pen.); Antczak 86'	Stadium: Niepołomice Stadium; Attendance: 1,609; Referee: (Poland) Karol Arys

20 October 2024 12	GKS Katowice	0–0	Śląsk Wrocław	Katowice
12:15 CET	Jędrych (yellow card) 16'; Klemenz (yellow card) 62'	Report	Guercio (yellow card) 90+3'	Stadium: GKS Katowice Stadium; Attendance: 6,750; Referee: (Poland) Patryk Gryckiewicz

27 October 2024 13	Legia Warsaw	4–1	GKS Katowice	Warsaw
20:15 CET	Kapuadi 28'; Chodyna 45+1'; Marc Gual (yellow card) 59'; Jędrych 60' (o.g.); Augustyniak 65'; Çelhaka (yellow card) 89'	Report	Zreľák 25'; Kowalczyk (yellow card) 33'	Stadium: Polish Army Stadium; Attendance: 25,188; Referee: (Poland) Karol Arys

4 November 2024 14	GKS Katowice	1–2	Korona Kielce	Katowice
18:00 CET	Klemenz 15'; Czerwiński (yellow card) 32'; Repka (yellow card) 45+2'	Report	Pedro Nuno 37' (pen.); Dawid Błanik 88'	Stadium: GKS Katowice Stadium; Attendance: 7,005; Referee: (Poland) Wojciech Myć

9 November 2024 15	Cracovia	3–4	GKS Katowice	Kraków
14:45 CET	Sokołowski (yellow card) 29'; Maigaard 45+3' 70'; Källman 90+3'; Ravas (yellow card) 90+8'; Hoskonen (yellow card) 90+9'; Amir Al-Ammari (yellow card) 90+10'	Report	Mak 15' 39' (yellow card) 82'; Klemenz (yellow card) 50'; Bergier (yellow card) 52'; Błąd 62'; Milewski 90+7'; Błąd (yellow card) 90+10'; Kudła (yellow card) 90+10'; Rafał Górak (red card) 90+10'	Stadium: Józef Piłsudski Cracovia Stadium; Attendance: 10,679; Referee: (Poland) Damian Sylwestrzak

23 November 2024 16	Lech Poznań	2–0	GKS Katowice	Poznań
17:30 CET	Ishak 3'; Ali Gholizadeh 57'	Report	Borja Galán (yellow card) 21'; Wasielewski (yellow card) 41'	Stadium: Poznań Stadium; Attendance: 28,254; Referee: (Poland) Łukasz Kuźma

30 November 2024 17	GKS Katowice	2–0	Lechia Gdańsk	Katowice
17:30 CET	Jędrych 14'; Błąd (yellow card) 36'; Bergier 43'	Report	Khlan (yellow card) 1'	Stadium: GKS Katowice Stadium; Attendance: 6,699; Referee: (Poland) Marcin Kochanek

6 December 2024 18	Radomiak Radom	1–1	GKS Katowice	Radom
18:00 CET	Leonardo Rocha 49'; Paulo Henrique (yellow card) 50'; Zié Ouattara (yellow card) 53'; Raphael Rossi (yellow card) 57'; Donis (yellow card) 81'; Wolski (yellow card) 90+2'	Report	Bergier 20'; Wasielewski (yellow card) 56'; Repka (yellow card) 59'; Mak (yellow card) 87'	Stadium: Radom Municipal Stadium; Attendance: 3,877; Referee: (Poland) Patryk Gryckiewicz

31 January 2025 19	GKS Katowice	1–0	Stal Mielec	Katowice
18:00 CET	Wasielewski 62'; Kuusk (yellow card) 74'; Komor (yellow card) 89'	Report	Robert Dadok (yellow card) 29'	Stadium: GKS Katowice Stadium; Attendance: 7,067; Referee: (Poland) Sebastian Krasny

8 February 2025 20	Raków Częstochowa	1–2	GKS Katowice	Częstochowa
17:30 CET	Ivi 54'; Plavšić (yellow card) 60'	Report	Bergier 19'; Kowalczyk (yellow card) 48' (goal) 65'; Repka (yellow card) 90+5'	Stadium: Miejski Stadion Piłkarski Raków; Attendance: 5,500; Referee: (Poland) Wojciech Myć

16 February 2025 21	GKS Katowice	0–0	Piast Gliwice	Katowice
14:45 CET		Report	Dziczek (yellow card) 43'; Miguel Muñoz (yellow card) 57'	Stadium: GKS Katowice Stadium; Attendance: 6,753; Referee: (Poland) Tomasz Kwiatkowski

24 February 2025 22	Motor Lublin	3–2	GKS Katowice	Lublin
19:00 CET	Piotr Ceglarz 15'; van Hoeven 21' (yellow card) 28'; Mráz 57'; Filip Wójcik (yellow card) 73'; Stolarski (yellow card) 80'	Report	Bergier 8'; Kuusk (yellow card) 18'; Borja Galán 51' (yellow card) 88'; Szymczak (yellow card) 90'	Stadium: Motor Lublin Arena; Attendance: 11,856; Referee: (Poland) Damian Kos

2 March 2025 23	Jagiellonia Białystok	1–0	GKS Katowice	Białystok
17:30 CET	Romanczuk 36'	Report	Repka (yellow card) 47'	Stadium: Chorten Arena; Attendance: 14,271; Referee: (Poland) Wojciech Myć

9 March 2025 24	GKS Katowice	1–0	Zagłębie Lubin	Katowice
12:15 CET	Bergier 78' (yellow card) 90+2'; Nowak (yellow card) 90+3'	Report	Adam Radwański (yellow card) 52'; Wdowiak (yellow card) 90+2'; Burić (yellow card) 90+2'	Stadium: GKS Katowice Stadium; Attendance: 6,751; Referee: (Poland) Patryk Gryckiewicz

15 March 2025 25	Widzew Łódź	1–0	GKS Katowice	Łódź
20:15 CET	Sypek (yellow card) 4' (goal) 60'; Therkildsen (yellow card) 50'; Tupta (yellow card) 77'; Sobol (yellow card) 86'	Report		Stadium: Widzew Łódź Stadium; Attendance: 17,473; Referee: (Poland) Damian Sylwestrzak

30 March 2025 26	GKS Katowice	2–1	Górnik Zabrze	Katowice
17:30 CET	Olkowski 38'; Jędrych (yellow card) 80'; Szymczak 90+11'	Report	Podolski (yellow card) 27'; Zahović 51'	Stadium: GKS Katowice Stadium; Attendance: 15,048; Referee: (Poland) Tomasz Kwiatkowski

6 April 2025 27	Pogoń Szczecin	4–0	GKS Katowice	Szczecin
17:30 CET	Koulouris 45+6' (pen.) 49' 87'; Ulvestad 82'	Report	Kowalczyk (yellow card) 28'	Stadium: Stadion Miejski im. Floriana Krygiera; Attendance: 19,938; Referee: (Poland) Paweł Raczkowski

12 April 2025 28	GKS Katowice	3–1	Puszcza Niepołomice	Katowice
14:45 CET	Bergier 59' 80'; Sipľak 90+4' (o.g.)	Report	Barkouski 10'; Crăciun (yellow card) 25'	Stadium: GKS Katowice Stadium; Attendance: 12,132; Referee: (Poland) Piotr Rzucidło

19 April 2025 29	Śląsk Wrocław	0–2	GKS Katowice	Wrocław
14:45 CET		Report	Petkov 19' (o.g.); Repka 43'; Bergier (yellow card) 55'; Kowalczyk (yellow card) 73'; Kudła (yellow card) 77'	Stadium: Wrocław Stadium; Attendance: 21,006; Referee: (Japan) Yūsuke Araki

26 April 2025 30	GKS Katowice	1–3	Legia Warsaw	Katowice
20:15 CET	Szymczak 63'	Report	Claude Gonçalves 15'; Shkurin 17'; Ziółkowski (yellow card) 65'; Oyedele (yellow card) 72'; Marc Gual 90+3'	Stadium: GKS Katowice Stadium; Attendance: 14,611; Referee: (Poland) Karol Arys

5 May 2025 31	Korona Kielce	2–1	GKS Katowice	Kielce
19:00 CET	Shikavka 45+1'; Dawid Błanik 90+4'	Report	Repka (yellow card) 44' (yellow-red card) 90+1' (goal) 83'	Stadium: EXBUD Arena; Attendance: 10,905; Referee: (Poland) Piotr Rzucidło

11 May 2025 32	GKS Katowice	2–1	Cracovia	Katowice
14:45 CET	Kuusk 2'; Repka 78'	Report	Perković (yellow card) 18'; Amir Al-Ammari 36'	Stadium: GKS Katowice Stadium; Attendance: 13,853; Referee: (Poland) Damian Kos

18 May 2025 33	GKS Katowice	2–2	Lech Poznań	Katowice
17:30 CET	Repka 14'; Jędrych (yellow card) 49'; Wasielewski (yellow card) 58'; Nowak 59'; Marzec (yellow card) 90+4'	Report	Wålemark (yellow card) 33' (goal) 43'; González 76'; Milić (yellow card) 90+1'; Frederiksen (yellow card) 90+2'	Stadium: GKS Katowice Stadium; Attendance: 14,325; Referee: (Poland) Bartosz Frankowski

24 May 2025 34	Lechia Gdańsk	2–3	GKS Katowice	Gdańsk
17:30 CET	Sezonienko 24'; Khlan 65'; Michał Głogowski (yellow card) 67'; Mena (yellow card) 77'; Kałahur (yellow card) 90+3'	Report	Szymczak 10'; Repka 75'; Kałahur 85' (o.g.)	Stadium: Polsat Plus Arena Gdańsk; Attendance: 15,000; Referee: (Poland) Jacek Małyszek

=== Polish Cup ===
24 September 2024 First Round	Bruk-Bet Termalica Nieciecza	1-2	GKS Katowice	Nieciecza
19:22	Kacper Karasek 45'	Report	Bartosz Jaroszek 19'; Antczak 66'	Stadium: Stadion Sportowy Bruk-Bet Termalica; Attendance: 2,348; Referee: (Poland) Piotr Urban

30 October 2024 Round of 32	Unia Skierniewice	2-1	GKS Katowice	Skierniewice
19:00	Mateusz Szmyd 41'; Kamil Sabiłło 45'	Report	Borja Galán 59'	Stadium: Municipal Stadium; Referee: (Poland) Jacek Małyszek
