= 2026–27 Ekstraklasa =

101st season of top-tier football league in Poland

Ekstraklasa
- Season: 2026–27
- Dates: 24 July 2026 – 22 May 2027
- Matches: 124
- Goals: 370 (2.98 per match)
- Top goalscorer: Jordi Sánchez (10 goals)
- Biggest home win: Legia 5–0 Radomiak (14 August 2026); GKS 5–0 Wisła P. (23 August 2026); Lech 6–1 Korona (18 October 2026)
- Biggest away win: Raków 2–5 Jagiellonia (30 August 2026); Raków 1–4 GKS (9 October 2026); Śląsk 1–4 Lech (10 October 2026)
- Highest scoring: Piast 4–3 Wisła K. (1 August 2026); Piast 3–4 Wieczysta (15 August 2026); Raków 2–5 Jagiellonia (30 August 2026); Lech 6–1 Korona (18 October 2026); Pogoń 4–3 Radomiak (24 October 2026)
- Longest winning run: 5 matches Lech Poznań; Pogoń Szczecin
- Longest unbeaten run: 11 matches Legia Warsaw
- Longest winless run: 10 matches Widzew Łódź
- Longest losing run: 6 matches Raków Częstochowa
- Highest attendance: 37,407; Lech 6–1 Korona (18 October 2026)
- Total attendance: 1,907,037
- Average attendance: 15,379 ▲13.1%
- All statistics correct as of 9 November 2026.

The 2026–27 Ekstraklasa (also known as PKO Bank Polski Ekstraklasa due to sponsorship reasons) is the 101st season of the Polish Football Championship, the 93rd season of the highest tier domestic division in the Polish football league system since its establishment in 1927 and the 19th season of the Ekstraklasa under its current title. The league is operated by the Ekstraklasa S.A.

Lech Poznań entered the season as two-time defending champions after winning their 10th Polish title the previous season, winning their first back-to-back championships in 33 years.

== Season overview ==
The season started on 24 July 2026 and will conclude on 22 May 2027.

The regular season is played as a round-robin tournament. A total of 18 teams participate, 15 of which competed in the league campaign during the previous season, while the remaining three were promoted from the I liga. Each team will play a total of 34 matches, half at home and half away. It is the ninth Ekstraklasa season to use VAR.

== Teams ==
A total of 18 teams participates in the 2026–27 edition of the Ekstraklasa. This season marks the first time since 1994–95 season to have three clubs from the same city in the top-flight and since 1953 season, in Kraków.

=== Changes from last season ===
On 8 May 2026, Wisła Kraków was the first promoted team after their 2–0 win over Chrobry Głogów, returning to the Ekstraklasa after four years of absence, having last played in the 2021–22 Ekstraklasa season. On 17 May 2026, Śląsk Wrocław was the second promoted team after their 3–1 win over Polonia Bytom, returning to the Ekstraklasa after one year of absence. Wieczysta Kraków was the third team promoted after their 2–1 win over Chrobry Głogów in the promotion play-offs final, being promoted to the Ekstraklasa for the first time in their history.

On 3 May 2026, Bruk-Bet Termalica Nieciecza was the first relegated team after their 5–1 loss against GKS Katowice. Nieciecza was relegated after one season in the top flight. On 18 May 2026, Arka Gdynia was the second relegated team after their 3–2 loss to Bruk-Bet Termalica Nieciecza. Arka was relegated after one season in the top flight. On 23 May 2026, Lechia Gdańsk was the third team relegated after a 3–2 loss to Bruk-Bet Termalica Nieciecza in the final round of the season, after two seasons in Ekstraklasa.

Promoted from 2025–26 I liga	Relegated from 2025–26 Ekstraklasa
▲ Wisła Kraków (1st) ▲ Śląsk Wrocław (2nd) ▲ Wieczysta Kraków (PO)	▼ Lechia Gdańsk (16th) ▼ Arka Gdynia (17th) ▼ Bruk-Bet Termalica Nieciecza (18th)

=== Stadiums and locations ===
Note: Table lists in alphabetical order.

Location of teams in 2026–27 Ekstraklasa.
Location of teams in the Katowice urban area in 2026–27 Ekstraklasa.
Location of teams in Kraków in 2026–27 Ekstraklasa.

Team	Location	Venue	Capacity
Cracovia	Kraków	Marshal Józef Piłsudski Stadium	15,016
GKS Katowice	Katowice	Arena Katowice	15,048
Górnik Zabrze	Zabrze	Ernest Pohl Stadium	28,236^{1}
Jagiellonia Białystok	Białystok	Chorten Arena	22,432
Korona Kielce	Kielce	Exbud Arena	15,122
Lech Poznań	Poznań	Enea Stadium	42,837
Legia Warsaw	Warsaw	Polish Army Stadium	31,103
Motor Lublin	Lublin	Motor Lublin Arena	15,247
Piast Gliwice	Gliwice	Piotr Wieczorek Stadium	10,037
Pogoń Szczecin	Szczecin	Florian Krygier Stadium	21,163
Radomiak Radom	Radom	Czachor Brothers Stadium	14,440
Raków Częstochowa	Częstochowa	Miejski Stadion Piłkarski Raków	5,500
Śląsk Wrocław	Wrocław	Tarczyński Arena Wrocław	42,771
Widzew Łódź	Łódź	Widzew Łódź Stadium	18,018
Wieczysta Kraków	Kraków	Henryk Reyman Synerise Arena	33,326^{2}
Wisła Kraków	Kraków	Henryk Reyman Synerise Arena	33,326
Wisła Płock	Płock	Kazimierz Górski Orlen Stadium	15,004
Zagłębie Lubin	Lubin	KGHM Zagłębie Arena	16,068

1. Upgrading to 31,871.
2. Due to the fact Wieczysta Stadium doesn't meet the Ekstraklasa regulations, Wieczysta Kraków host their matches at the Henryk Reyman Synerise Arena.

Cracovia	GKS Katowice	Górnik Zabrze	Jagiellonia Białystok	Korona Kielce	Lech Poznań
Marshal Józef Piłsudski Stadium	Arena Katowice	Ernest Pohl Stadium	Chorten Arena	Exbud Arena	Enea Stadium
Capacity: 15,016	Capacity: 15,048	Capacity: 28,236	Capacity: 22,372	Capacity: 15,700	Capacity: 42,837
Legia Warsaw	Motor Lublin	Piast Gliwice	Pogoń Szczecin	Radomiak Radom	Raków Częstochowa
Polish Army Stadium	Motor Lublin Arena	Piotr Wieczorek Stadium	Florian Krygier Stadium	Czachor Brothers Stadium	Miejski Stadion Piłkarski Raków
Capacity: 31,006	Capacity: 15,247	Capacity: 9,913	Capacity: 21,163	Capacity: 14,440	Capacity: 5,500
Śląsk Wrocław	Widzew Łódź	Wieczysta Kraków	Wisła Kraków	Wisła Płock	Zagłębie Lubin
Tarczyński Arena Wrocław	Widzew Łódź Stadium	Synerise Arena Kraków		Kazimierz Górski Orlen Stadium	KGHM Zagłębie Arena
Capacity: 42,771	Capacity: 18,018	Capacity: 33,326		Capacity: 15,004	Capacity: 16,086

=== Personnel and kits ===
All teams have Lotto (brand of Totalizator Sportowy) placed on the center of the chest.

Team	Chairman	Head coach	Captain	Kit manufacturer	Kit sponsors	
Team	Chairman	Head coach	Captain	Kit manufacturer	Main	Other(s)
Cracovia		(Serbia) Aleksandar Vuković	(Georgia (country)) Otar Kakabadze	Puma	ROB-HUT, Fortuna	List: Back: Reliance Holding; Sleeves: Peak11; Shorts: Kraków
GKS Katowice	(Poland) Sławomir Witek	(Poland) Rafał Górak	(Poland) Arkadiusz Jędrych	Macron	Superbet	List: Back: Kuchnia Wikinga; Sleeves: PIB Broker; Shorts: Katowice
Górnik Zabrze	(Poland) Michał Siara	(Slovakia) Michal Gašparík	(Slovenia) Erik Janža	Reebok	Superbet, Madej Wróbel	List: Back: ZARYS International; Sleeves: Stanley Works, Kumho Tire; Shorts: Corendon Airlines, AMiO
Jagiellonia Białystok		(Poland) Adrian Siemieniec	(Poland) Taras Romanczuk	Macron	Superbet, Kuchnia Wikinga	List: Back: Białystok; Sleeves: Podlaskie; Shorts: PND Energia, RS Budownictwo
Korona Kielce	(Poland) Leszek Czarny	(Poland) Robert Kolendowicz	(Poland) Mariusz Stępiński	4F	Imperium Truck Matysek, Defro	List: Back: Lewiatan; Sleeves: CreoConcept, Świętokrzyskie Voivodeiship, Exbud; Shorts: Keewe, CreoConcept
Lech Poznań	(Poland) Karol Klimczak (Poland) Piotr Rutkowski	(Denmark) Niels Frederiksen	(Sweden) Mikael Ishak	Macron	Superbet	List: Back: Lech Pils; Sleeves: Ebury; Shorts: Arbiton, Stiga
Legia Warsaw	(Poland) Dariusz Mioduski	(Poland) Marek Papszun	(Poland) Bartosz Kapustka	Adidas	Plus500	List: Back: Fortuna; Sleeves: Królewskie; Shorts: Warsaw
Motor Lublin	(Poland) Zbigniew Jakubas	(Poland) Mariusz Misiura	(Poland) Karol Czubak	Macron	Lublin, Maspo	List: Back: Perła; Sleeves: Mercedes-Benz Nobile Motors, Lubelskie Voivodeship, LV Bet; Shorts: Mennica Polska
Piast Gliwice	(Poland) Mariusz Siewierski	(Poland) Daniel Myśliwiec	(Poland) Jakub Czerwiński	4F	Lebull, Betters	List: Back: Gliwice; Sleeves: verocargo, GAPR; Shorts: NEXX Developer
Pogoń Szczecin	(Canada) Alexander Haditaghi	(Spain) Óscar García	(Poland) Kamil Grosicki	Capelli	Port Szczecin-Świnoujście, STS	List: Sleeves: Szczecin
Radomiak Radom	(Poland) Sławomir Stempniewski	(England) John Carver	(Poland) Rafał Wolski	Adidas	Enea	List: Back: MOSiR Radom; Sleeves: Fortuna, Windoor, 11teamsports; Shorts: Toyota Romanowski
Raków Częstochowa	(Poland) Wojciech Cygan	(Poland) Dawid Szwarga	(Croatia) Fran Tudor	Adidas	Hisense, x-kom	List: Back: STS; Sleeves: Częstochowa, Extralink; Shorts: ZPUE, Częstochowa
Śląsk Wrocław	(Poland) Remigiusz Jezierski	(Croatia) Toni Golem	(Poland) Piotr Samiec-Talar	Macron	Zdrovo, LV Bet	List: Back: JAXAN; Sleeves: Wrocław Airport, Bodzio, Horizontal Global; Shorts: Acana, Lower Silesian Voivodeship
Widzew Łódź	(Poland) Robert Dobrzycki (acting)	(Poland) Mateusz Stolarski	(Albania) Juljan Shehu	Macron	Newport by Panattoni, TERMOton	List: Back: STS; Sleeves: Trasko Invest, Foodify; Shorts: Murapol, D&D
Wieczysta Kraków	(Poland) Andrzej Turecki	(Poland) Jacek Zieliński	(Denmark) Mikkel Maigaard	Adidas	BrainMax	List: Back: Amara; Sleeves: Unisport; Shorts: Kraków, Ecomer
Wisła Kraków	(Poland) Jarosław Królewski	(Poland) Mariusz Jop	(Poland) Alan Uryga	Kappa	Superbet, Wienkra	List: Back: Synerise; Sleeves: JD Sports; Shorts: Szubryt
Wisła Płock	(Poland) Maciej Wiącek	(Poland) Adam Majewski	(Poland) Łukasz Sekulski	Adidas	Orlen	List: Back: Budmat; Sleeves: Płock, LV Bet; Shorts: Płock
Zagłębie Lubin		(Poland) Leszek Ojrzyński	(Poland) Damian Dąbrowski	Nike	KGHM	List: Sleeves:* Sleeves: Unisport

Notes

- Adidas is the official ball supplier for Ekstraklasa.
- Zina is the official sponsor of the Referee's Committee of the Polish Football Association.

=== Managerial changes ===
Team	Outgoing manager	Manner of departure	Date of vacancy	Position in table	Incoming manager	Date of appointment
Wisła Płock	(Poland) Mariusz Misiura	Mutual consent	16 June 2026	Pre-season	(Poland) Adam Majewski	22 June 2026
Motor Lublin	(Poland) Mateusz Stolarski	Sacked	18 June 2026	Pre-season	(Poland) Mariusz Misiura	18 June 2026
Radomiak Radom	(Portugal) Bruno Baltazar	Mutual consent	21 June 2026	Pre-season	(Poland) Tomasz Kaczmarek	22 June 2026
Pogoń Szczecin	(Denmark) Thomas Thomasberg	Sacked	22 June 2026	Pre-season	(Spain) Óscar García	23 June 2026
Wieczysta Kraków	(Poland) Kazimierz Moskal	Sacked	22 August 2026	15th	(Croatia) Željko Kopić	26 August 2026
Raków Częstochowa	(Poland) Dawid Kroczek	Sacked	31 August 2026	18th	(Poland) Dawid Szulczek	1 September 2026
Raków Częstochowa	(Poland) Dawid Szulczek	End of caretaker basis	8 September 2026	18th	(Poland) Tomasz Kaczmarek	8 September 2026
Radomiak Radom	(Poland) Tomasz Kaczmarek	Signed by Raków Częstochowa	8 September 2026	12th	(Poland) Rafał Grzyb	8 September 2026
Widzew Łódź	(Serbia) Aleksandar Vuković	Sacked	10 September 2026	13th	(Poland) Mateusz Stolarski	11 September 2026
Radomiak Radom	(Poland) Rafał Grzyb	Change of role	29 September 2026	14th	(England) John Carver	29 September 2026
Raków Częstochowa	(Poland) Tomasz Kaczmarek	Sacked	19 October 2026	18th	(Poland) Dawid Szwarga	21 October 2026
Korona Kielce	(Poland) Jacek Zieliński	Sacked	19 October 2026	9th	(Poland) Robert Kolendowicz	20 October 2026
Śląsk Wrocław	(Slovenia) Ante Šimundža	Sacked	2 November 2026	16th	(Croatia) Toni Golem (Note: Golem was initially appointed as caretaker manager, before being appointed permanent manager on 19 November 2026.)	4 November 2026
Wieczysta Kraków	(Croatia) Željko Kopić	Sacked	7 November 2026	18th	(Poland) Jacek Zieliński	10 November 2026
Cracovia	(Sweden) Bartosz Grzelak	Sacked	8 November 2026	16th	(Serbia) Aleksandar Vuković	11 November 2026

- Italics for interim managers.

== League table ==
Pos	Team	Pld	W	D	L	GF	GA	GD	Pts	Qualification or relegation
1	Lech Poznań	14	11	2	1	35	13	+22	35	Qualification for the Champions League play-off round
2	Górnik Zabrze	15	9	4	2	23	14	+9	31	Qualification for the Champions League second qualifying round
3	Legia Warsaw	15	7	6	2	26	15	+11	27	Qualification for the Europa League second qualifying round
4	Zagłębie Lubin	15	7	5	3	20	17	+3	26	Qualification for the Conference League second qualifying round
5	Piast Gliwice	15	7	4	4	26	20	+6	25	
6	Wisła Kraków	15	7	4	4	22	19	+3	25	
7	Pogoń Szczecin	14	7	3	4	21	17	+4	24	
8	GKS Katowice	15	7	0	8	25	21	+4	21	
9	Jagiellonia Białystok	14	7	0	7	19	21	−2	21	
10	Motor Lublin	14	5	4	5	22	24	−2	19	
11	Korona Kielce	15	5	3	7	14	23	−9	18	
12	Cracovia	15	4	3	8	19	24	−5	15	
13	Raków Częstochowa	15	5	0	10	26	32	−6	15	
14	Wisła Płock	14	4	3	7	14	22	−8	15	
15	Radomiak Radom	15	4	3	8	17	29	−12	15	
16	Widzew Łódź	15	2	8	5	21	22	−1	14	Relegation to I liga
17	Śląsk Wrocław	15	3	4	8	19	26	−7	13	Relegation to I liga
18	Wieczysta Kraków	14	2	2	10	18	28	−10	8	Relegation to I liga

Updated to match(es) played on 22 November 2026. Source: ekstraklasa.org 90minut.pl
Rules for classification: 1) Points; 2) Head-to-head points; 3) Head-to-head goal difference; 4) Goal difference; 5) Goals scored; 6) Number of wins; 7) Number of away wins; 8) Lower number of points based on yellow and red cards (red card = 3 points, yellow card = 1 point, sending-off = 3 points - including 1 point for first yellow card); 9) Fairplay ranking; 10) Draw.
(Note: Head-to-head record is used only after all the matches between the teams in question have been played)

== Results ==
Home \ Away	CRA	GKS	GÓR	JAG	KOR	LPO	LEG	MOT	PIA	POG	RAD	RAK	ŚLĄ	WID	WIE	WKR	WPŁ	ZAG
Cracovia	—		0–1	3–1			1–1	1–2		0–2		2–1			3–2			3–1
GKS Katowice	3–2	—				0–1				0–1	3–1			3–2	2–1		5–0	
Górnik Zabrze		2–3	—			2–1	0–0		1–1				2–1		2–1	2–1		
Jagiellonia Białystok		1–0	1–3	—	1–0		1–3						2–1	0–2			1–0	
Korona Kielce		1–0	0–2		—		1–1	1–1			0–2	3–2				1–1		
Lech Poznań	0–0			2–1	6–1	—			3–0		5–1	1–0				3–1		2–2
Legia Warsaw						1–2	—				5–0	2–4	1–1	1–1		2–0		3–1
Motor Lublin		1–0	0–0	1–2			2–3	—	0–2				3–2				3–2	2–2
Piast Gliwice	3–1	3–0			2–0		1–1		—	1–2				2–1	3–4	4–3		
Pogoń Szczecin					2–0		0–1	3–1		—	4–3		1–2		2–0	2–2	1–1	
Radomiak Radom	2–1		1–3					2–3	0–2		—		3–1		2–1	0–0		0–0
Raków Częstochowa		1–4	1–2	2–5				2–1		3–1		—		3–1			1–2	2–3
Śląsk Wrocław	0–0				1–2	1–4			0–0			2–1	—	3–3	2–0			
Widzew Łódź			1–1		1–2	2–3		2–2		3–0	0–0			—	2–2	0–0		
Wieczysta Kraków				1–3		1–2						1–2			—		3–0	1–1
Wisła Kraków	2–1	2–1		2–0								2–1	2–1		2–0	—	2–1	
Wisła Płock	3–1				0–2		0–1		2–2		1–0			0–0			—	
Zagłębie Lubin		2–1	2–0	1–0	1–0				2–0	0–0			2–1				0–2	—

Updated to match(es) played on 22 November 2026. Source: ekstraklasa.org
Legend: Blue = home team win; Yellow = draw; Red = away team win.
For upcoming matches, an "a" indicates there is an article about the rivalry between the two participants.

== Season statistics ==
=== Top goalscorers ===
As of 22 November 2026

Rank	Player	Team	Goals
1	(Spain) Jordi Sánchez	Wisła Kraków (6); Pogoń Szczecin (4)	10
2	(Poland) Patryk Makuch	Raków Częstochowa	9
3	(Belarus) Ilya Shkurin	GKS Katowice	8
4	(Poland) Karol Czubak	Motor Lublin	7
4	(Bosnia and Herzegovina) Ajdin Hasić	Cracovia	7
4	(Poland) Bartosz Nowak	GKS Katowice	7
4	(Sweden) Patrik Wålemark	Lech Poznań	7
8	(Spain) Pablo Rodríguez	Lech Poznań	6
8	(Poland) Mariusz Stępiński	Korona Kielce	6
10	(Ivory Coast) Yannick Agnero	Lech Poznań	5
10	(Poland) Przemysław Banaszak	Śląsk Wrocław	5
10	(Poland) Jan Grzesik	Radomiak Radom	5
10	(Slovenia) Nik Prelec	Jagiellonia Białystok	5
10	(Poland) Marcel Reguła	Zagłębie Lubin	5
10	(Iran) Allahyar Sayyadmanesh	Lech Poznań	5
10	(Poland) Karol Świderski	Widzew Łódź	5
10	(Poland) Kacper Urbański	Górnik Zabrze	5
10	(Spain) Hugo Vallejo	Piast Gliwice	5
10	(Poland) Łukasz Zjawiński	Legia Warsaw	5

=== Clean sheets ===
As of 22 November 2026

Rank	Player	Team	Clean sheets
1	(Serbia) Zlatan Alomerović	Zagłębie Lubin	6
2	(Romania) Valentin Cojocaru	Pogoń Szczecin	5
2	(Poland) Bartłomiej Drągowski	Widzew Łódź	5
2	(Slovenia) Domen Gril	Piast Gliwice	5
2	(Romania) Otto Hindrich	Legia Warsaw	5
6	(Poland) Mateusz Lis	Lech Poznań	4
6	(Poland) Marcel Łubik	Wisła Kraków	4
6	(Poland) Filip Majchrowicz	Radomiak Radom	4
6	(Germany) Philipp Schulze	Górnik Zabrze	4
10	(Poland) Rafał Leszczyński	Wisła Płock	3
10	(Poland) Karol Niemczycki	Śląsk Wrocław	3

=== Hat-tricks ===
Player	For	Against	Result	Date	Ref
(Norway) Tobias Christensen	Wieczysta Kraków	Piast Gliwice	3–4 (A)	15 August 2026	
(Belarus) Ilya Shkurin	GKS Katowice	Górnik Zabrze	2–3 (A)	30 August 2026	
(Poland) Bartosz Nowak	GKS Katowice	Widzew Łódź	3–2 (H)	31 October 2026	

== Attendances ==
Pos	Team	Total	High	Low	Average	Change
1	Wisła Kraków	225,929	33,000	30,736	32,276	+19.3%^{1}
2	Lech Poznań	225,871	37,407	18,302	28,234	−9.1%
3	Górnik Zabrze	192,508	28,007	25,998	27,501	+15.1%
4	Legia Warsaw	185,504	27,410	24,337	26,501	+12.8%
5	Śląsk Wrocław	131,642	33,863	9,031	18,806	+12.0%^{1}
6	Pogoń Szczecin	128,132	20,757	12,191	18,305	+1.6%
7	Jagiellonia Białystok	124,436	20,456	15,306	17,777	−0.2%
8	Widzew Łódź	134,949	17,555	16,010	16,869	−2.2%
9	Korona Kielce	86,147	14,561	10,488	12,307	+4.9%
10	Motor Lublin	94,450	15,200	7,618	11,806	−3.6%
11	Cracovia	81,136	14,018	8,611	11,591	−2.6%
12	GKS Katowice	65,247	12,427	9,116	10,875	−11.0%
13	Radomiak Radom	61,897	12,074	6,696	8,842	−10.9%
14	Wisła Płock	33,296	11,089	4,131	6,659	−27.0%
15	Piast Gliwice	43,371	7,361	4,375	6,196	+26.2%
16	Zagłębie Lubin	43,257	10,100	3,396	6,180	−4.0%
17	Raków Częstochowa	35,890	5,327	4,759	5,127	−4.1%
18	Wieczysta Kraków	13,375	6,792	1,282	2,675	+1.3%^{1}
	League total	1,907,037	37,407	1,282	15,379	+13.1%

Updated to games played on 8 November 2026.
Source: 90minut.pl (in Polish)
Notes:
1. Team played last season in I liga.

== Awards ==
=== Monthly awards ===
==== Player of the Month ====
Month	Player	Team
August 2026	(Poland) Piotr Samiec-Talar	Śląsk Wrocław
September 2026	(Spain) Ángel Rodado	Wisła Kraków
October 2026	(Poland) Bartosz Nowak	GKS Katowice
November 2026		
February 2027		
March 2027		
April 2027		
May 2027		

==== Young Player of the Month ====
Month	Player	Team
August 2026	(Poland) Marcel Reguła	Zagłębie Lubin
September 2026	(Poland) Jakub Żewłakow	Legia Warsaw
October 2026	(Poland) Michał Gurgul	Lech Poznań
November 2026		
February 2027		
March 2027		
April 2027		
May 2027		

==== Coach of the Month ====
Month	Coach	Team
August 2026	(Denmark) Niels Frederiksen	Lech Poznań
September 2026	(Slovakia) Michal Gašparík	Górnik Zabrze
October 2026	(Denmark) Niels Frederiksen	Lech Poznań
November 2026		
February 2027		
March 2027		
April 2027		
May 2027		

== Number of teams by region ==
Number	Region	Team(s)
4	Silesian Voivodeship	GKS Katowice, Górnik Zabrze, Piast Gliwice, Raków Częstochowa
3	Lesser Poland Voivodeship	Cracovia, Wieczysta Kraków, Wisła Kraków
3	Masovian Voivodeship	Legia Warsaw, Radomiak Radom, Wisła Płock
2	Lower Silesian Voivodeship	Zagłębie Lubin, Śląsk Wrocław
1	Greater Poland Voivodeship	Lech Poznań
1	Lublin Voivodeship	Motor Lublin
1	Łódź Voivodeship	Widzew Łódź
1	Podlaskie Voivodeship	Jagiellonia Białystok
1	Świętokrzyskie Voivodeship	Korona Kielce
1	West Pomeranian Voivodeship	Pogoń Szczecin

== See also ==
- 2026–27 I liga
- 2026–27 II liga
- 2026–27 III liga
- 2026–27 Polish Cup
- 2026 Polish Super Cup
