= Tomasz Grzegorczyk =

Polish football manager (born 1981)

Personal information
- Date of birth: 13 March 1981 (age 45)
- Place of birth: Szczecin, Poland
- Height: 1.78 m (5 ft 10 in)
- Position: Midfielder

Team information
- Current team: Arka Gdynia (manager)

Senior career*
Years	Team	Apps	(Gls)
–2002	Błękitni Stargard Szczeciński		
2002–2003	SG Sonnenhof Großaspach	1	(0)
2003	Lüneburger SK		
2004–2006	Grevesmühlener FC		
2006–2007	Larne	22	(4)
2007–2011	Torgelower SV Greif	74	(5)

Managerial career
- 2010–2011: Torgelower SV Greif U19
- 2011–2012: Torgelower SV Greif
- 2013–2018: Torgelower FC Greif
- 2018–2020: TSG Neustrelitz
- 2020–2021: Błękitni Stargard
- 2021–2022: Olimpia Elbląg
- 2022: Resovia
- 2022–2023: Górnik Polkowice
- 2024: Arka Gdynia (interim)
- 2025: Pogoń Szczecin (caretaker)
- 2026–: Arka Gdynia
- * Club domestic league appearances and goals

Tomasz Grzegorczyk (born 13 March 1981) is a Polish professional football manager and former player who played as a midfielder. He is currently in charge of I liga club Arka Gdynia.

== Playing career ==
Grzegorczyk started his senior career with Błękitni Stargard Szczeciński. In 2002, he moved to Germany, where he spent the rest of his playing career, except for one year spent with Northern Irish side Larne. In Germany, he played for several fifth- and sixth-tier sides, such as SG Sonnenhof Großaspach, Lüneburger SK, Grevesmühlener FC and Torgelower SV Greif, before retiring in 2011.

== Managerial career ==
=== German lower leagues ===
Grzegorczyk began his coaching career in 2010, working with the under-19 team of Torgelower SV Greif. A year later, upon retirement, he was appointed head coach of their senior team. In 2018, he took charge of TSG Neustrelitz.

=== Błękitni Stargard ===
On 1 August 2020, Grzegorczyk returned to Poland to join Błękitni Stargard's coaching staff as an assistant. Two days later, after Adam Topolski was forced to step away due to health issues, Grzegorczyk replaced him as head coach. On 8 March 2021, Grzegorczyk left the club by mutual consent.

=== Olimpia Elbląg ===
On 25 June 2021, Grzegorczyk was appointed manager of II liga side Olimpia Elbląg. In his only season in charge of Olimpia, he led the club to a ninth-place finish in the 2021–22 II liga.

=== Resovia ===
On 3 June 2022, I liga club Resovia announced Grzegorczyk as their new manager after exercising a release clause in his contract. On 6 September, his contract was terminated.

=== Górnik Polkowice ===
On 14 September 2023, Grzegorczyk was named manager of II liga club Górnik Polkowice on a deal until the end of the season, with an option to extend. Following their relegation to the fourth tier, Grzegorczyk and Górnik agreed to part ways in June 2023.

=== Arka Gdynia ===
On 19 June 2023, Grzegorczyk took on the role of assistant coach at I liga side Arka Gdynia, working with head coach Wojciech Łobodziński.

After Łobodziński left Arka on 26 August 2024, Grzegorczyk took over as manager on a temporary basis. On 9 October, hours after a 6–0 away win over Odra Opole, it was announced he would be replaced by Dawid Szwarga at the end of the year, despite Arka having won all six games played since Grzegorczyk's appointment. During his stint, Grzegorczyk led Arka to 10 wins, two draws and two losses, and left his post with Arka placed 2nd in the league table. On 2 January 2025, he terminated his contract with the club.

=== Pogoń Szczecin ===
On 7 January 2025, Grzegorczyk joined Ekstraklasa club Pogoń Szczecin as an assistant coach under Robert Kolendowicz. On 17 September, he was appointed caretaker following Kolendowicz's sacking the day prior. Four days later, in Grzegorczyk's top-flight managerial debut, Pogoń lost 3–4 at home to Lechia Gdańsk. He returned to assistant duties on 30 September upon the appointment of Thomas Thomasberg. He was relieved of his position on 21 April 2026.

=== Return to Arka Gdynia ===
On 27 September 2026, Grzegorczyk was again appointed manager of second-tier club Arka Gdynia, this time on a permanent basis. He signed a deal until the end of the season, with an option to extend.

== Managerial statistics ==
As of match played 21 November 2026

Managerial record by team and tenure
Team	From	To	Record							
Team	From	To	G	W	D	L	GF	GA	GD	Win %
Torgelower SV Greif	1 July 2011	2 April 2012	22	11	3	8	42	33	+9	50.00
Torgelower FC Greif	1 July 2013	15 March 2018	149	79	24	46	334	178	+156	53.02
TSG Neustrelitz	12 April 2018	1 August 2020	60	23	13	24	83	95	−12	38.33
Błękitni Stargard	3 August 2020	8 March 2021	21	6	4	11	23	44	−21	28.57
Olimpia Elbląg	25 June 2021	3 June 2022	35	12	10	13	33	35	−2	34.29
Resovia	3 June 2022	6 September 2022	10	1	4	5	7	13	−6	10.00
Górnik Polkowice	14 September 2022	6 June 2023	24	7	4	13	33	38	−5	29.17
Arka Gdynia (interim)	26 August 2024	11 December 2024	14	10	2	2	34	12	+22	71.43
Pogoń Szczecin (caretaker)	17 September 2025	30 September 2025	3	1	0	2	6	5	+1	33.33
Arka Gdynia	27 September 2026	Present	7	3	1	3	12	10	+2	42.86
Total			345	153	65	127	607	463	+144	44.35

== Honours ==
=== Managerial ===
Torgelower FC Greif

- Verbandsliga Mecklenburg-Vorpommern: 2016–17
