= Adrian Błąd =

Polish footballer

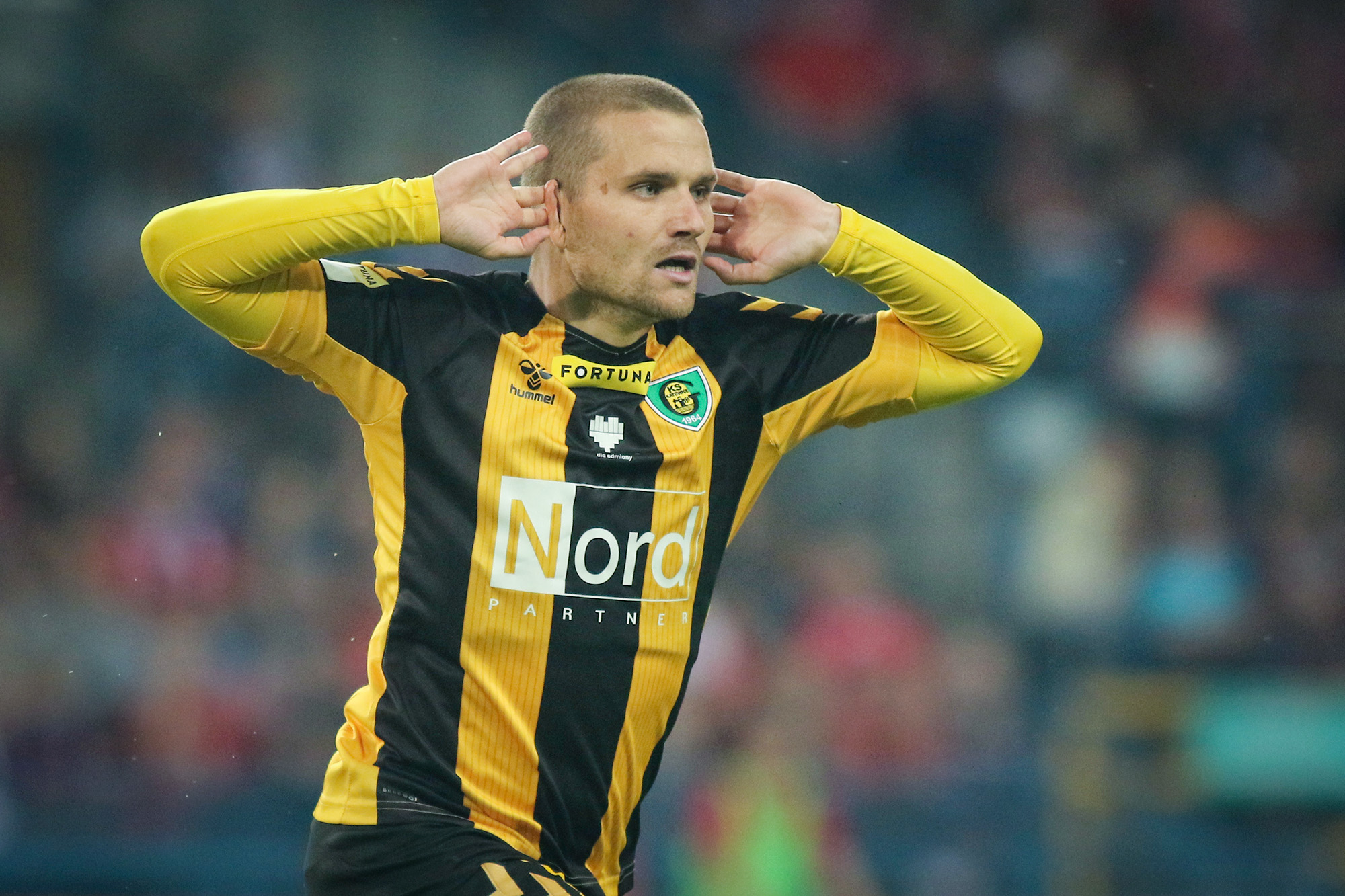
- Błąd with GKS Katowice in 2022

Personal information
- Full name: Adrian Błąd
- Date of birth: 16 April 1991 (age 35)
- Place of birth: Lubin, Poland
- Height: 1.69 m (5 ft 7 in)
- Position: Winger

Team information
- Current team: GKS Katowice
- Number: 11

Youth career
- Zagłębie Lubin

Senior career*
Years	Team	Apps	(Gls)
2008–2009	Zagłębie Lubin II	20	(2)
2009–2017	Zagłębie Lubin	88	(11)
2011–2012	→ Zawisza Bydgoszcz (loan)	51	(18)
2016–2017	→ Arka Gdynia (loan)	14	(1)
2017–	GKS Katowice	275	(49)

International career
	Poland U19	4	(0)
	Poland U20	3	(1)
- * Club domestic league appearances and goals as of 10:12, 30 May 2026 (UTC)

Adrian Błąd (born 16 April 1991) is a Polish professional footballer who plays as a winger for Ekstraklasa club GKS Katowice.

== Club career ==
=== Zagłębie Lubin ===
Błąd began his career in the youth system of Zagłębie Lubin. After progressing through the club's academy, he played for its reserve team before being promoted to the senior squad.

He made his Ekstraklasa debut on 21 August 2009 in a 1–0 away defeat against Ruch Chorzów.

=== Zawisza Bydgoszcz ===
In July 2011, Błąd joined Zawisza Bydgoszcz on loan. He scored on his league debut and appeared in all 34 league matches during the 2011–12 season, recording 15 goals and four assists. His performances earned him the Piłka Nożna magazine award for the best player in the I liga in 2011.

Following a brief return to Lubin, he rejoined Zawisza for the first half of the following season. Zagłębie recalled him in December 2012. Błąd finished his spell in Bydgoszcz with 51 league appearances and 18 goals.

=== Return to Zagłębie Lubin ===
After returning to Zagłębie, Błąd was part of the team that won the 2014–15 I liga title and secured promotion to the Ekstraklasa. He made 26 first-team appearances and scored five goals during the campaign. In June 2015, he extended his contract with the club for a further three years.

=== Arka Gdynia ===
Błąd spent the 2016–17 season on loan at Arka Gdynia. He made 14 league appearances and scored once. He was also a member of the Arka squad which won the 2016–17 Polish Cup, defeating Lech Poznań 2–1 after extra time in the final.

=== GKS Katowice ===
In August 2017, Błąd left Zagłębie and joined GKS Katowice on a permanent transfer. He signed an initial one-year contract which included an option for an extension. He made his debut for GKS on 9 September 2017. During his first season, he scored eight goals in 23 league appearances.

Błąd recorded ten goals in 34 league appearances during the 2018–19 season, but GKS were relegated to the II liga. He remained with the club following relegation and became an important member of the team managed by Rafał Górak.

During the 2020–21 campaign, Błąd scored 11 goals in 34 league appearances. On 7 June 2021, he scored the opening goal and assisted another in a 4–1 victory over Stal Rzeszów. The result secured GKS's promotion to the I liga after two seasons in the third tier.

GKS spent the following three seasons in the I liga. On 26 May 2024, Błąd scored the only goal of a 1–0 away victory against his former club Arka Gdynia on the final day of the 2023–24 season. The victory moved GKS above Arka into second place and secured direct promotion to the Ekstraklasa, ending the club's 19-year absence from the top division. Błąd finished the promotion campaign with five goals in 34 league appearances.

In the 2024–25 season, he appeared in all 34 of GKS' league matches and scored twice as the club finished eighth in its first campaign back in the Ekstraklasa.

In July 2025, Błąd extended his contract with GKS until June 2027. By the end of the 2025–26 season, he had made 287 competitive appearances and scored 49 goals for GKS Katowice.

== International career ==
Błąd represented Poland at under-19 and under-20 level. On 6 September 2010, he scored the only goal in Poland under-20's 1–0 victory over Italy in the Four Nations Tournament.

== Honours ==
Zagłębie Lubin

- I liga: 2014–15

Arka Gdynia

- Polish Cup: 2016–17

Individual

- I liga Player of the Year: 2011
- I liga Player of the Month: May 2024
