= Marcin Wasielewski =

Polish footballer

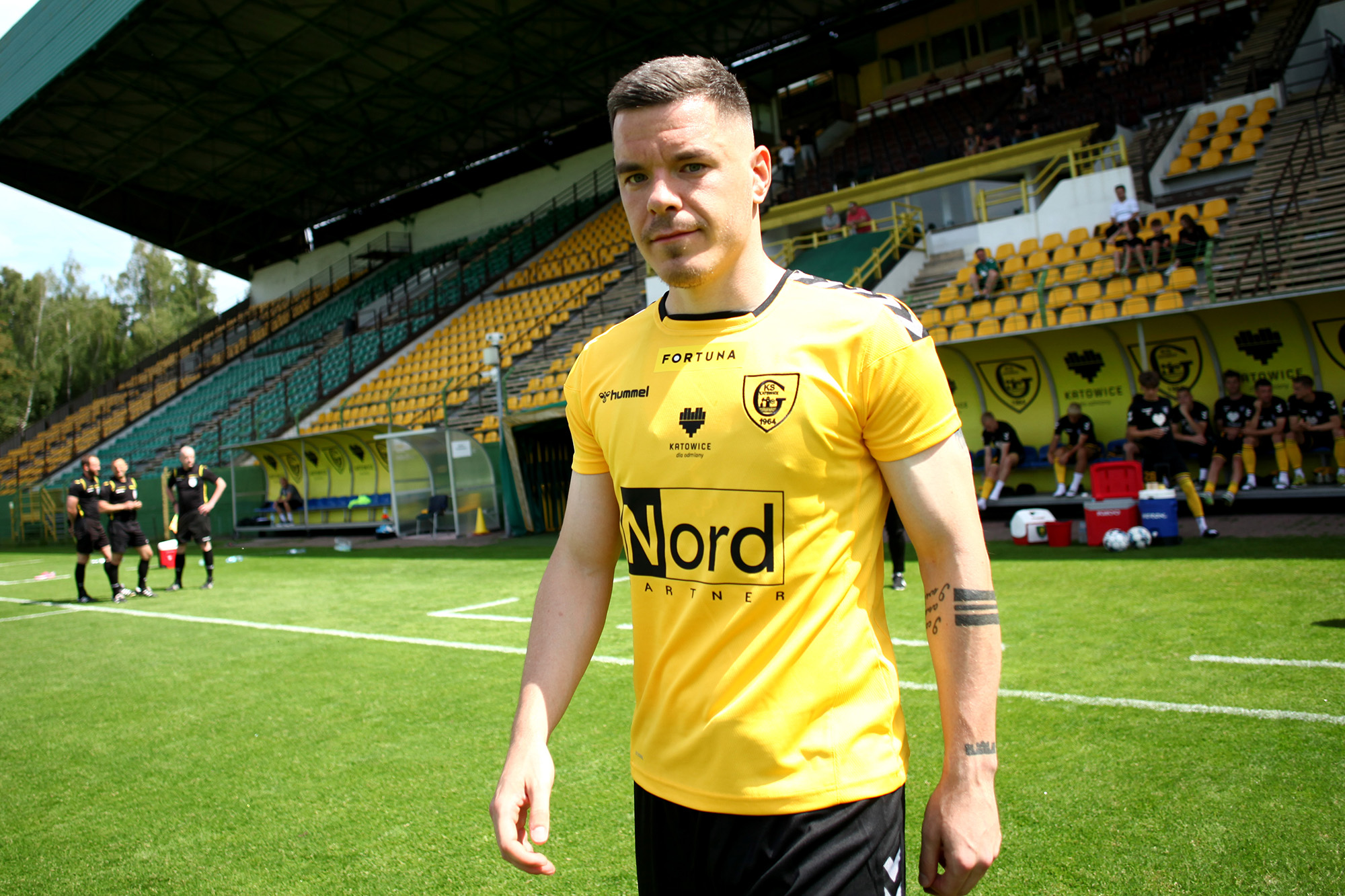
- Wasielewski with GKS Katowice in 2022

Personal information
- Full name: Marcin Wasielewski
- Date of birth: 23 August 1994 (age 32)
- Place of birth: Poznań, Poland
- Height: 1.72 m (5 ft 8 in)
- Position: Right-back

Team information
- Current team: GKS Katowice
- Number: 23

Youth career
- –2006: Poznaniak Poznań
- 2006–2012: Lech Poznań
- 2012–2013: SKS 13 Poznań

Senior career*
Years	Team	Apps	(Gls)
2013–2015	Unia Swarzędz	60	(8)
2015–2019	Lech Poznań II	69	(4)
2016–2019	Lech Poznań	19	(1)
2018	→ Znicz Pruszków (loan)	14	(0)
2019–2022	Bruk-Bet Termalica	61	(0)
2022–	GKS Katowice	131	(5)
- * Club domestic league appearances and goals as of 09:13, 9 August 2026 (UTC)

Marcin Wasielewski (born 23 August 1994) is a Polish professional footballer who plays as a right-back for Ekstraklasa club GKS Katowice.

He previously represented Lech Poznań, Znicz Pruszków and Bruk-Bet Termalica Nieciecza. Wasielewski can also operate as a right-sided wing-back.

== Club career ==
=== Early career ===
Wasielewski began playing football with Poznaniak Poznań before joining the academy of Lech Poznań at the age of twelve. He progressed through the club's youth teams and appeared in the Młoda Ekstraklasa during the 2011–12 season.

After leaving Lech's academy in 2012, he spent a season with SKS 13 Poznań. In 2013, Wasielewski joined III liga club Unia Swarzędz, where he began his senior career. He made 60 league appearances and scored eight goals across two seasons.

=== Lech Poznań ===
Wasielewski returned to Lech Poznań in 2015, initially joining its reserve team. He made 28 appearances and scored two goals during his first season after returning. His performances for the reserves led to his inclusion in the first-team squad by manager Nenad Bjelica in the autumn of 2016.

He made his first-team and Ekstraklasa debut on 10 February 2017, appearing in a 3–0 home victory over Bruk-Bet Termalica Nieciecza. He made two league appearances and one Polish Cup appearance for Lech during the 2016–17 season.

On 2 February 2018, Wasielewski joined II liga side Znicz Pruszków on loan until the end of the season. He made 14 league appearances before returning to Poznań.

During the 2018–19 campaign, Wasielewski made 17 Ekstraklasa appearances and scored his first top-flight goal. He also appeared nine times for Lech's reserve team as they won their III liga group and earned promotion to the II liga.

Lech announced in April 2019 that Wasielewski would leave when his contract expired at the end of June. He recorded 19 Ekstraklasa appearances and one goal for the club's first team.

=== Bruk-Bet Termalica Nieciecza ===
In April 2019, it was announced that Wasielewski would join I liga club Bruk-Bet Termalica Nieciecza on a free transfer from the beginning of the 2019–20 season.

He made 21 league appearances in his first season and 25 during the 2020–21 campaign. Bruk-Bet finished second in the I liga in the 2020–21 season and earned promotion to the Ekstraklasa.

Wasielewski appeared in 15 Ekstraklasa matches during the 2021–22 season. He left Bruk-Bet following the club's relegation, having made 61 league appearances over three seasons.

=== GKS Katowice ===
On 13 June 2022, Wasielewski signed a two-year contract with GKS Katowice. He joined the I liga club following the expiry of his agreement with Bruk-Bet Termalica. He made his GKS debut on 16 July 2022 and appeared in 33 league matches during his first season.

In the 2023–24 season, Wasielewski made 32 league appearances, scoring once and providing eight assists. GKS finished second in the I liga and secured promotion to the Ekstraklasa, ending the club's 19-year absence from the top division.

Wasielewski retained his regular place following promotion. He made 32 league appearances, scored two goals and recorded six assists during the 2024–25 campaign. In the following season, he appeared in 33 Ekstraklasa matches and scored twice.

On 29 April 2026, Wasielewski signed a new two-year contract with GKS, extending his stay until June 2028. The agreement included an option for an additional season.

In July 2026, he made his first appearance in UEFA club competition as GKS entered the qualifying rounds of the UEFA Conference League. As of 8 August, he had appeared in three Conference League qualifying matches during the 2026–27 season.

== Career statistics ==
As of match played 12 August 2026

Appearances and goals by club, season and competition
Club	Season	League			Polish Cup		Europe		Total	
Club	Season	Division	Apps	Goals	Apps	Goals	Apps	Goals	Apps	Goals
Unia Swarzędz	2013–14	III liga, gr. C	31	3	—		—		31	3
Unia Swarzędz	2014–15	III liga, gr. C	29	5	—		—		29	5
Unia Swarzędz	Total		60	8	—		—		60	8
Lech Poznań II	2015–16	III liga, gr. C	28	2	—		—		28	2
Lech Poznań II	2016–17	III liga, gr. II	21	0	—		—		21	0
Lech Poznań II	2017–18	III liga, gr. II	11	1	—		—		11	1
Lech Poznań II	2018–19	III liga, gr. II	9	1	—		—		9	1
Lech Poznań II	Total		69	4	—		—		69	4
Lech Poznań	2016–17	Ekstraklasa	2	0	1	0	—		3	0
Lech Poznań	2018–19	Ekstraklasa	17	1	0	0	0	0	17	1
Lech Poznań	Total		19	1	1	0	0	0	20	1
Znicz Pruszków (loan)	2017–18	II liga	14	0	—		—		14	0
Bruk-Bet Termalica	2019–20	I liga	21	0	1	0	—		22	0
Bruk-Bet Termalica	2020–21	I liga	25	0	2	0	—		27	0
Bruk-Bet Termalica	2021–22	Ekstraklasa	15	0	3	0	—		18	0
Bruk-Bet Termalica	Total		61	0	6	0	—		67	0
GKS Katowice	2022–23	I liga	33	0	1	0	—		34	0
GKS Katowice	2023–24	I liga	32	1	1	0	—		33	1
GKS Katowice	2024–25	Ekstraklasa	32	2	1	0	—		33	2
GKS Katowice	2025–26	Ekstraklasa	33	2	5	0	—		38	2
GKS Katowice	2026–27	Ekstraklasa	1	0	0	0	4 (Note: Appearances in UEFA Conference League)	0	5	0
GKS Katowice	Total		131	5	8	0	4	0	143	5
Career total			354	18	15	0	4	0	373	18

== Honours ==
Unia Swarzędz

- Polish Cup (Poznań regionals): 2013–14

Lech Poznań II

- III liga, group II: 2018–19
