= Mateusz Kowalczyk =

Mateusz Kowalczyk may refer to:

- Mateusz Kowalczyk (tennis) (born 1987), Polish tennis player who specialises in doubles
- Mateusz Kowalczyk (footballer) (born 2004), Polish footballer
- Mateusz Kowalczyk (figure skater)
- Mateusz Kowalczyk (speedway rider)
