= Jędrzej Hanuszczak =

Polish footballer (born 2008)

Personal information
- Date of birth: 23 March 2008 (age 18)
- Place of birth: Poznań, Poland
- Height: 1.76 m (5 ft 9 1/2 in)
- Position: Midfielder

Team information
- Current team: Unia Swarzędz
- Number: 19

Youth career
- –2019: LPFA Piątkowo Poznań
- 2019–2026: Warta Poznań

Senior career*
Years	Team	Apps	(Gls)
2023	Warta Poznań	1	(0)
2026	Warta Poznań II	14	(4)
2026–	Unia Swarzędz	3	(0)

International career
2023	Poland U15	5	(1)
2023–2024	Poland U16	5	(0)
- * Club domestic league appearances and goals as of 20:41, 14 September 2026 (UTC)

Jędrzej Hanuszczak (born 23 March 2008) is a Polish professional footballer who plays as a midfielder for III liga club Unia Swarzędz. He is the third youngest player in Ekstraklasa's history.

== Career ==
Hanuszczak joined Warta Poznań's academy in 2019. He made his professional debut on 22 May 2023 in a 1–1 draw against Piast Gliwice, coming on as a substitute for Adam Zreľák in the 89th minute. At the time, Hanuszczak became the second youngest player to make an Ekstraklasa appearance, at the age of 15 years and 60 days. He was three days older than the former record holder Janusz Sroka when he made his top-flight debut for Cracovia in November 1969. This was his sole official appearance for Warta's senior team until his departure in 2026.

On 30 July 2026, Hanuszczak signed with III liga club Unia Swarzędz.
