= Borja Galán =

Spanish footballer

Personal information
- Full name: Borja Galán González
- Date of birth: 26 April 1993 (age 33)
- Place of birth: Madrid, Spain
- Height: 1.82 m (6 ft 0 in)
- Position: Winger

Team information
- Current team: GKS Katowice
- Number: 8

Youth career
- 2002–2012: Atlético Madrid

Senior career*
Years	Team	Apps	(Gls)
2010–2011	Atlético Madrid C	6	(1)
2012–2015	Atlético Madrid B	47	(3)
2015–2016	Getafe B	36	(8)
2016–2018	Deportivo B	70	(10)
2018–2019	Alcorcón	33	(2)
2019–2021	Deportivo La Coruña	29	(2)
2020	→ Racing Santander (loan)	10	(1)
2021–2022	Logroñés	16	(0)
2022	Hércules	15	(0)
2023–2024	Odra Opole	47	(12)
2024–	GKS Katowice	70	(6)

International career
2011	Spain U18	2	(0)
2012	Spain U20	4	(1)
- * Club domestic league appearances and goals as of 11:43, 10 October 2026 (UTC)

Borja Galán González (born 26 April 1993) is a Spanish professional footballer who plays for Polish club GKS Katowice as a winger.

== Club career ==
=== Atlético Madrid ===
Born in Madrid, Galán entered Atlético Madrid's youth academy at the age of nine. He progressed to Atlético Madrid C during the 2010–11 season, making his senior debut in the Tercera División while still a youth player. Ahead of the 2012–13 campaign, he was promoted to Atlético Madrid B in the Segunda División B.

In 2013, Galán suffered a serious knee injury which kept him out of competitive football for approximately 15 months. He returned to action with Atlético's reserve side in August 2014.

=== Getafe B and Deportivo Fabril ===
On 29 July 2015, following Atlético B's relegation, Galán joined Getafe CF and was assigned to the reserve team, which competed in Segunda División B. He made 36 league appearances and scored eight goals during his only season with the side.

On 14 July 2016, Galán signed for Deportivo Fabril, the reserve team of Deportivo de La Coruña. During his two seasons with Fabril, he scored 12 goals in all competitions. He contributed to the team's promotion to Segunda División B, including scoring in the second leg of the promotion play-off against CP Cacereño.

=== Alcorcón, Deportivo and Racing Santander ===
On 5 July 2018, Galán signed a two-year contract with Segunda División club AD Alcorcón. Deportivo retained an option to bring him back during the term of the agreement.

Galán made his professional debut on 18 August 2018, replacing Nono during the second half of a 1–1 home draw against Sporting de Gijón. He finished his first season in professional football with 33 league appearances and two goals.

On 8 July 2019, Deportivo exercised its buy-back option and Galán returned to the club. After making 13 league appearances during the first half of the campaign, he joined fellow Segunda División side Racing de Santander on loan on 31 January 2020, with the agreement running until the end of the season. He made ten league appearances for Racing and scored once.

Following the loan, Galán returned to Deportivo and remained with the club for its 2020–21 Segunda División B campaign, scoring twice in league competition. He left Deportivo after the season.

=== Logroñés and Hércules ===
On 31 August 2021, Galán signed a contract until June 2022 with UD Logroñés, which had recently been relegated to the newly established Primera Federación. He made 17 appearances for the club, consisting of 16 league matches and one Copa del Rey fixture. On 12 January 2022, his contract was terminated by mutual consent.

The following day, Galán joined Hércules CF for the remainder of the 2021–22 season, with an option for an additional year. He made 15 league appearances for the Alicante-based club.

=== Odra Opole ===
After spending the first half of the 2022–23 season without a club, Galán moved abroad for the first time in his career. On 15 January 2023, he signed a six-month contract with Polish I liga club Odra Opole, which included an option for a further season.

During the spring part of the campaign, Galán made 13 league appearances, scoring four goals and providing two assists as Odra avoided relegation. The club subsequently exercised the extension option in his contract.

Galán became one of Odra's regular attacking players during the 2023–24 season. He recorded nine goals and eight assists in 35 appearances across all competitions, while the club qualified for the I liga promotion play-offs. Across his season and a half in Opole, he played 48 matches in all competitions, scoring 13 goals and registering ten assists.

=== GKS Katowice ===
On 20 June 2024, newly promoted Ekstraklasa club GKS Katowice announced the signing of Galán on a two-year contract. He joined on a free transfer after the expiry of his agreement with Odra.

Galán made his competitive debut for GKS on 20 July 2024, starting in a 2–1 home defeat against Radomiak Radom on the opening matchday of the Ekstraklasa season. During the 2024–25 campaign, he was increasingly used as a left wing-back rather than in his previous position as a winger. He made 35 appearances across all competitions and scored three goals.

On 30 March 2025, his cross produced GKS's opening goal in a 2–1 victory over Górnik Zabrze. The match was the first official fixture played at the newly opened Arena Katowice.

Galán remained a regular starter during the 2025–26 season. On 16 January 2026, GKS announced that his contract had been extended by two years, until 30 June 2028. By that point, he had established himself primarily as a left wing-back under manager Rafał Górak.

== International career ==
Galán represented Spain at youth international level. In January 2011, he was selected for the Spain under-18 squad which competed in the Copa del Atlántico.

In 2012, Galán played for the Spain under-20 team at the L'Alcúdia International Tournament. On 19 August, he scored the final goal of Spain's 3–0 group-stage victory over Saudi Arabia.

== Honours ==
Individual

- I liga Player of the Month: July & August 2023
