= Mateusz Kowalczyk (footballer) =

Polish footballer (born 2004)

Personal information
- Date of birth: 16 April 2004 (age 22)
- Place of birth: Warsaw, Poland
- Height: 1.80 m (5 ft 11 in)
- Position: Midfielder

Team information
- Current team: GKS Katowice
- Number: 77

Youth career
- 2010–2018: Ząbkovia Ząbki

Senior career*
Years	Team	Apps	(Gls)
2018–2021	Ząbkovia Ząbki	34	(13)
2021–2022	ŁKS Łódź II	15	(1)
2022–2023	ŁKS Łódź	38	(7)
2023–2025	Brøndby	1	(0)
2024–2025	→ GKS Katowice (loan)	31	(3)
2025–	GKS Katowice	40	(2)

International career^{‡}
2022	Poland U18	2	(0)
2022–2023	Poland U19	6	(1)
2023–	Poland U20	6	(0)
2025–	Poland U21	13	(0)
- * Club domestic league appearances and goals as of 14:55, 10 November 2026 (UTC) ‡ National team caps and goals as of 21:26, 19 November 2026 (UTC)

Mateusz Kowalczyk (born 16 April 2004) is a Polish professional footballer who plays as a midfielder for Ekstraklasa club GKS Katowice.

== Club career ==
=== ŁKS Łódź ===
Born in Warsaw and raised in nearby Marki, Kowalczyk began his football journey at the age of six with Ząbkovia Ząbki. Displaying remarkable maturity at a young age, he took his first steps in senior football at the age of 14 with Ząbkovia. His talent quickly attracted the interest of several Polish clubs. Ultimately, in 2021, he chose to sign with ŁKS Łódź. The club's second team competed in the fourth tier, providing Kowalczyk with an opportunity to develop against senior opposition at a higher level. He made his second-team debut on 7 August 2021, starting in a 4–3 victory against Ursus Warsaw.

Kowalczyk made his professional debut for the ŁKS first team on 26 February 2022, coming on as a substitute for Jakub Tosik in the 65th minute during a 1–1 away draw against GKS Jastrzębie in the second-tier I liga. On 8 April 2021, he scored his first professional goal, securing a late winner in the 95th minute of a 3–2 home win over Sandecja Nowy Sącz.

During the 2022–23 season, Kowalczyk played a significant role in ŁKS' promotion to the top-tier Ekstraklasa, scoring six goals in 26 appearances for the Knights of Spring—including a decisive goal that secured the league title on 26 May 2023, against Arka Gdynia.

=== Brøndby ===
On 2 August 2023, Kowalczyk signed a four-year contract with Danish Superliga club Brøndby, with the club paying a reported fee of €1.2 million to secure his services. He made his debut for the club on 27 September, replacing Nicolai Vallys in the 68th minute of a 3–0 victory in the Danish Cup over HIK. Four days later, he made his Superliga debut, again coming on as a late substitute for Vallys in a victory against Hvidovre.

=== GKS Katowice ===
On 17 July 2024, Kowalczyk returned to Poland to join newly promoted Ekstraklasa club GKS Katowice on a season-long loan, with an option to make the move permanent. On 2 June 2025, Kowalczyk joined GKS permanently on a three-year contract, for a fee reported to be €1 million.

== International career ==
Kowalczyk has represented Poland at under-18 level. In August 2022, he was called up to by Poland U-19's coach Marcin Brosz for training camp in Reda ahead of the 2023 UEFA European Under-19 Championship qualifiers against Bosnia and Herzegovina, Estonia and Italy. He scored on his debut for the under-19s, contributing to Poland's 2–0 win over Bosnia and Herzegovina on 21 September 2022. On 28 August 2023, Kowalczyk received his first call-up for the Poland U-20, and he subsequently gained his first cap for the team on 8 September during a 4–0 home win over Portugal in the Under 20 Elite League.

Kowalczyk was called up to the senior Poland national team for the first time for the Nations League games against Scotland and Croatia in September 2024.

== Style of play ==
Kowalczyk, a hard-working central midfielder, displayed remarkable maturity on the pitch early on, making his senior football debut at the young age of 14. He describes himself as a player capable of controlling the game's pace, comfortable both in attacking and defensive roles. Despite his average height (1.81 m), he possesses excellent heading abilities. Often referred to as a 'piranha' in midfield, he excels in dispossessing opponents and is adept at playing a Gegenpressing style.

== Career statistics ==
As of match played 8 November 2026

Appearances and goals by club, season and competition
Club	Season	League			National cup (Note: Includes Polish Cup, Danish Cup)		Europe		Other		Total	
Club	Season	Division	Apps	Goals	Apps	Goals	Apps	Goals	Apps	Goals	Apps	Goals
Ząbkovia Ząbki	2018–19	IV liga Masovia	1	0	—		—		—		1	0
Ząbkovia Ząbki	2019–20	IV liga Masovia	8	1	—		—		—		8	1
Ząbkovia Ząbki	2020–21	IV liga Masovia	23	12	—		—		2 (Note: Appearances in IV liga Masovia promotion play-offs)	0	25	12
Ząbkovia Ząbki	Total		32	13	—		—		2	0	34	13
ŁKS Łódź II	2021–22	III liga, group I	15	1	—		—		—		15	1
ŁKS Łódź	2021–22	I liga	12	1	—		—		—		12	1
ŁKS Łódź	2022–23	I liga	26	6	1	0	—		—		27	6
ŁKS Łódź	Total		38	7	1	0	—		—		39	7
Brøndby	2023–24	Danish Superliga	1	0	2	0	—		0	0	3	0
GKS Katowice (loan)	2024–25	Ekstraklasa	31	3	1	0	—		—		32	3
GKS Katowice	2025–26	Ekstraklasa	28	1	3	0	—		—		31	1
GKS Katowice	2026–27	Ekstraklasa	12	1	1	0	2 (Note: Appearances in UEFA Conference League)	0	—		15	1
GKS Katowice	GKS Katowice total		71	5	5	0	2	0	—		78	5
Career total			157	26	8	0	2	0	2	0	169	26

== Honours ==
Ząbkovia Ząbki

- IV liga Masovia: 2020–21 (Warsaw group)

ŁKS Łódź

- I liga: 2022–23

Individual

- Ekstraklasa Young Player of the Month: August 2024
