= Adam Zreľák =

Slovak footballer (born 1994)

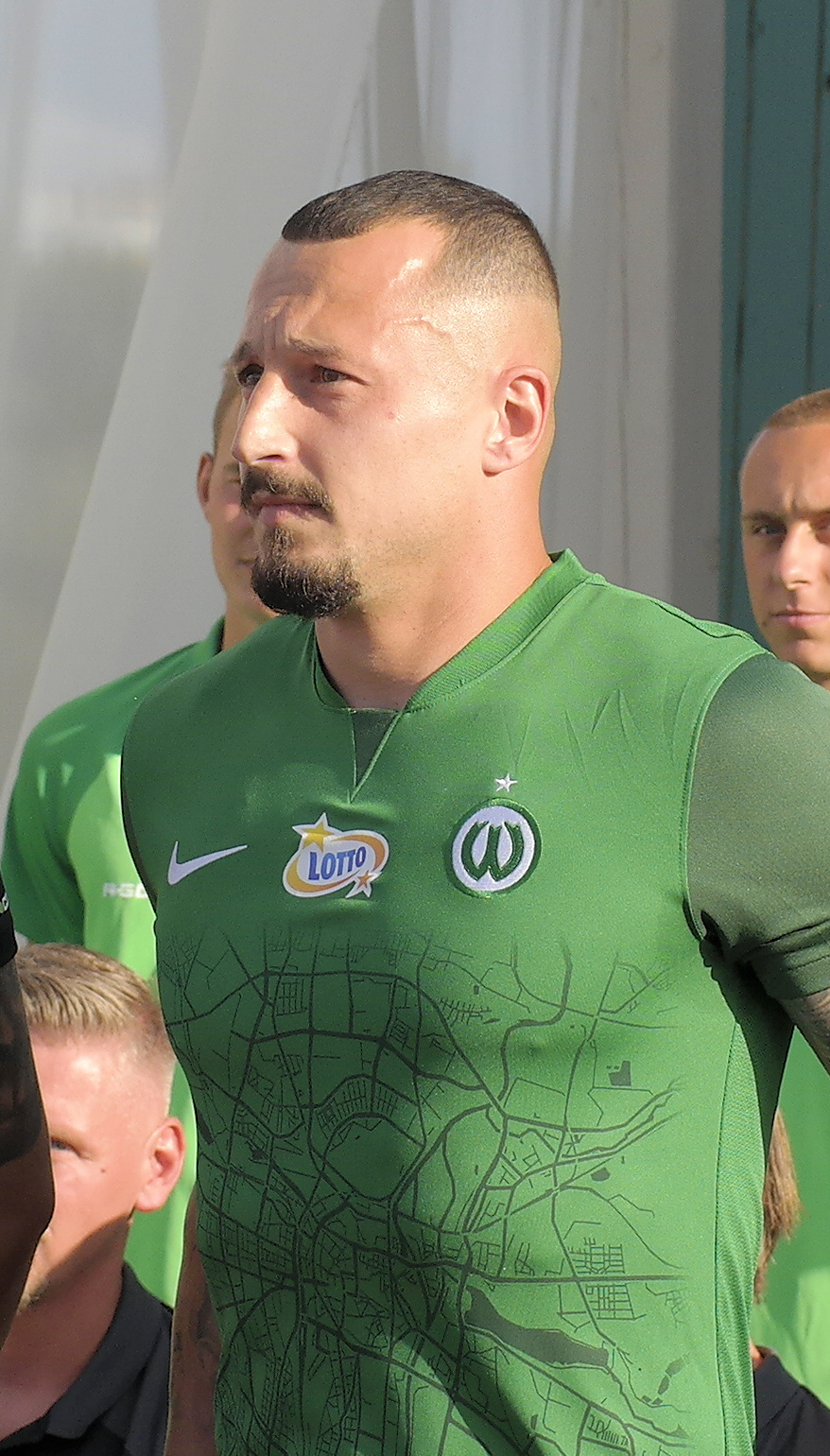
- Zrelak with Warta Poznań in 2023

Personal information
- Full name: Adam Zreľák
- Date of birth: 5 May 1994 (age 32)
- Place of birth: Stará Ľubovňa, Slovakia
- Height: 1.83 m (6 ft 0 in)
- Position: Forward

Team information
- Current team: GKS Katowice
- Number: 99

Youth career
- Odeva Lipany
- 2009–2013: Ružomberok

Senior career*
Years	Team	Apps	(Gls)
2013–2014	Ružomberok	61	(15)
2015–2016	Slovan Bratislava	41	(10)
2016–2017	Jablonec	5	(2)
2017–2021	Nürnberg	45	(4)
2021–2024	Warta Poznań	82	(21)
2024–	GKS Katowice	36	(6)

International career^{‡}
2012–2013	Slovakia U19	3	(1)
2013–2017	Slovakia U21	25	(14)
2013–	Slovakia	9	(3)
- * Club domestic league appearances and goals as of 22:08, 12 August 2026 (UTC) ‡ National team caps and goals as of 21:11, 26 March 2023 (UTC)

Adam Zreľák (born 5 May 1994) is a Slovak professional footballer who plays as a forward for Polish club GKS Katowice.

== Career ==
=== MFK Ružomberok ===
Zreľák began playing football with TJ Sokol Ľubotín before joining ŠK Odeva Lipany. In 2009, he moved to the youth system of MFK Ružomberok.

He made his senior league debut on 3 March 2013, appearing in a 3–0 away victory over FK Senica. Zreľák subsequently established himself in the first team. He made 61 league appearances and scored 15 goals for Ružomberok before leaving the club in January 2015.

=== Slovan Bratislava ===
On 14 January 2015, Zreľák transferred to reigning Slovak champions ŠK Slovan Bratislava. He became a regular member of the team and also represented the club in UEFA Europa League qualifying. During his spell in Bratislava, he recorded 41 league appearances and ten goals.

In September 2016, Slovan sold Zreľák to Czech club FK Jablonec. The move followed his decision not to accept a proposed new four-year contract in Bratislava.

=== FK Jablonec ===
Zreľák arrived at Jablonec while recovering from a stress fracture in his foot. Following surgery and several months of rehabilitation, he made his Czech First League debut on 4 March 2017 in a goalless draw against Bohemians 1905.

He scored his first two goals for the club in a 5–0 league victory over FC Vysočina Jihlava. Shortly afterwards, however, he aggravated the foot injury during a match against FK Mladá Boleslav and required another operation. He recovered in time to captain Slovakia at the 2017 UEFA European Under-21 Championship.

Zreľák's time at Jablonec was consequently limited to five league appearances, in which he scored twice. In July 2017, he transferred to German club 1. FC Nürnberg.

=== 1. FC Nürnberg ===
Nürnberg announced Zreľák's signing on 7 July 2017, shortly after the conclusion of the European Under-21 Championship. He made 13 league appearances and scored once during the 2017–18 season, as Nürnberg won promotion to the Bundesliga.

An ankle injury affected the beginning of his first Bundesliga campaign. Zreľák nevertheless made 14 top-flight appearances and scored twice during the 2018–19 season. On 27 February 2019, Nürnberg announced that he had torn the anterior cruciate ligament in his right knee during training. He returned to competitive football approximately nine months later, initially appearing for Nürnberg's reserve team.

Zreľák made 15 appearances in all competitions during the 2019–20 season, including both legs of Nürnberg's relegation play-off. His playing time decreased during the following campaign and, with his contract approaching its expiry, he left the club in February 2021 to join Warta Poznań.

=== Warta Poznań ===
On 11 February 2021, Zreľák signed for Warta until the end of the 2020–21 season, with the Polish club holding an option to extend the agreement for a further two years. The option was exercised in June 2021, extending his contract until 2023.

Zreľák became a regular starter for Warta, scoring nine league goals in 2021–22 and eight in 2022–23. In January 2023, he signed another agreement, valid until June 2025 with an option for one additional season.

A serious knee injury sustained in September 2023 ruled him out for approximately six months. After returning, he scored a hat-trick in Warta's 5–2 league victory over Stal Mielec on 22 April 2024.

Following Warta's relegation from the Ekstraklasa, Zreľák terminated his contract by mutual agreement on 25 June 2024. He left the club with 82 league appearances and 21 goals. He had also served as captain and was nominated for the Ekstraklasa Forward of the Season award for 2022–23.

=== GKS Katowice ===
On the same day as his departure from Warta, Zreľák signed a two-year contract with newly promoted Ekstraklasa club GKS Katowice.

He scored three goals and provided one assist in his first 12 league appearances for GKS. In November 2024, he suffered a non-contact injury during a match against Cracovia and subsequently underwent ankle surgery. The injury kept him out for more than six months, and he returned near the end of the season as a late substitute against Lech Poznań.

During the 2025–26 campaign, Zreľák made 22 league appearances and scored three goals. He also scored once in the Polish Cup. On 15 January 2026, he signed a new contract running until June 2027, with an option for a further extension.

In July 2026, Zreľák appeared in GKS's return to European competition after a 23-year absence. The first leg of the 2026–27 UEFA Conference League second qualifying round against MŠK Žilina was his first club match in Slovakia for more than ten years. On 30 July, he scored the opening goal of the return leg, which GKS won 3–1 to advance 4–3 on aggregate. It was the club's first successful European tie since 1994. As of 10 August 2026, he had made 41 competitive appearances and scored eight goals for GKS.

== International career ==
Zreľák represented Slovakia at under-19 and under-21 level. He later became captain of the under-21 side and led the team at the 2017 UEFA European Under-21 Championship in Poland.

He made his senior international debut on 19 November 2013, coming on as a substitute in a goalless friendly draw against Gibraltar. The match was Gibraltar's first official fixture after becoming a member of UEFA.

Zreľák scored his first senior international goal in a 3–1 friendly victory over Georgia on 27 May 2016. His second came on 16 November 2018 in a 4–1 UEFA Nations League victory against Ukraine.

On 25 September 2022, Zreľák came off the bench and scored the equaliser in a 1–1 Nations League draw with Belarus. He had made nine senior international appearances and scored three goals by March 2023.

== Career statistics ==
=== Club ===
As of match played 6 August 2026

Appearances and goals by club, season and competition
Club	Season	League			National cup (Note: Includes Slovak Cup, DFB-Pokal, Polish Cup)		Europe		Other		Total	
Club	Season	Division	Apps	Goals	Apps	Goals	Apps	Goals	Apps	Goals	Apps	Goals
Ružomberok	2012–13	Slovak Super Liga	11	1	0	0	—		—		11	1
Ružomberok	2013–14	Slovak Super Liga	32	8	5	0	—		—		37	8
Ružomberok	2014–15	Slovak Super Liga	18	6	0	0	—		—		18	6
Ružomberok	Total		61	15	5	0	0	0	0	0	66	15
Slovan Bratislava	2014–15	Slovak Super Liga	13	4	2	0	—		—		15	4
Slovan Bratislava	2015–16	Slovak Super Liga	26	6	5	3	5 (Note: Appearances in UEFA Europa League)	2	—		36	11
Slovan Bratislava	2016–17	Slovak Super Liga	2	0	0	0	3	0	—		5	0
Slovan Bratislava	Total		41	10	7	3	8	2	0	0	56	15
Jablonec	2016–17	Czech First League	5	2	0	0	—		—		5	2
Nürnberg	2017–18	2. Bundesliga	13	1	0	0	—		—		13	1
Nürnberg	2018–19	Bundesliga	14	2	3	1	—		—		17	3
Nürnberg	2019–20	2. Bundesliga	13	1	0	0	—		2 (Note: Appearances in 2. Bundesliga relegation play-offs)	0	15	1
Nürnberg	2020–21	2. Bundesliga	5	0	0	0	—		—		5	0
Nürnberg	Total		45	4	3	1	0	0	2	0	50	5
Warta Poznań	2020–21	Ekstraklasa	8	0	0	0	—		—		8	0
Warta Poznań	2021–22	Ekstraklasa	29	9	1	0	—		—		30	9
Warta Poznań	2022–23	Ekstraklasa	31	8	1	0	—		—		32	8
Warta Poznań	2023–24	Ekstraklasa	14	4	0	0	—		—		14	4
Warta Poznań	Total		82	21	2	0	—		—		84	21
GKS Katowice	2024–25	Ekstraklasa	13	3	1	0	—		—		14	3
GKS Katowice	2025–26	Ekstraklasa	22	3	1	1	—		—		23	4
GKS Katowice	2026–27	Ekstraklasa	1	0	0	0	3 (Note: Appearances in UEFA Conference League)	1	—		4	1
GKS Katowice	Total		36	6	2	1	3	1	—		41	8
Career total			270	58	19	5	11	3	2	0	302	66

=== International ===
As of match played 26 March 2023

Appearances and goals by national team and year
National team	Year	Apps	Goals
Slovakia
Slovakia	2013	1	0
Slovakia	2016	1	1
Slovakia	2018	2	1
Slovakia	2020	1	0
Slovakia	2022	3	1
Slovakia	2023	1	0
Total		9	3

Scores and results list Slovakia's goal tally first, score column indicates score after each Zreľák goal.

List of international goals scored by Adam Zreľák
No.	Date	Venue	Opponent	Score	Result	Competition
1	27 May 2016	ASKÖ Stadion, Wels, Austria	Georgia	3–0	3–1	Friendly
2	16 November 2018	Štadión Antona Malatinského, Trnava, Slovakia	Ukraine	2–1	4–1	2018–19 UEFA Nations League B
3	25 September 2022	TSC Arena, Bačka Topola, Serbia	Belarus	1–1	1–1	2022–23 UEFA Nations League C
