= Dawid Szwarga =

Polish football manager (born 1990)

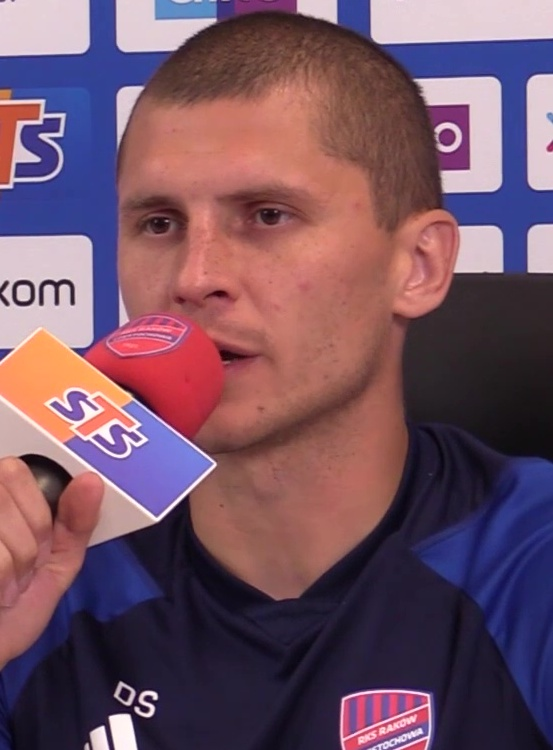
- Szwarga as Raków Częstochowa manager in 2023

Personal information
- Date of birth: 7 October 1990 (age 36)
- Place of birth: Jastrzębie-Zdrój, Poland
- Height: 1.94 m (6 ft 4 in)
- Position: Centre-back

Team information
- Current team: Raków Częstochowa (manager)

Youth career
- MOSiR Jastrzębie Zdrój

Senior career*
Years	Team	Apps	(Gls)
2008–2009	Odra Wodzisław Śląski	0	(0)
2009–2010	GKS Jastrzębie	29	(1)
2010–2012	Pniówek Pawłowice	54	(6)
2012–2013	Szczakowianka Jaworzno	28	(1)
2013–2014	Nadwiślan Góra	29	(4)
2014–2015	Skra Częstochowa	36	(0)
2015–2016	Unia Dąbrowa Górnicza		
2017	Płomień Połomia		
2017–2018	Unia Dąbrowa Górnicza	28	(8)
2020–2021	Victoria Jaworzno	0	(0)

Managerial career
- 2023–2024: Raków Częstochowa
- 2024–2026: Arka Gdynia
- 2026–: Raków Częstochowa
- * Club domestic league appearances and goals

Dawid Szwarga (born 7 October 1990) is a Polish professional football manager and former player who is currently the manager of Ekstraklasa club Raków Częstochowa.

== Playing career ==
The son of former midfielder Mirosław, Dawid Szwarga began his footballing career at his hometown club, MOSiR, following in his father's footsteps. In 2008, he joined Ekstraklasa club Odra Wodzisław Śląski but did not make any senior appearances, only playing for their Młoda Ekstraklasa side. He went on to play for II liga and III liga clubs from the Silesia area, such as GKS Jastrzębie, Pniówek Pawłowice, Szczakowianka Jaworzno, Nadwiślan Góra and Skra Częstochowa. In 2012, he trialed with top division side Korona Kielce.

In total, Szwarga made 29 third division appearances, scoring once, and 147 fourth division appearances, scoring 10 league goals, before retiring after multiple short stints with lower division clubs.

== Managerial career ==
=== Assistant at GKS Katowice ===
Szwarga began his coaching career in June 2018, after being recommended by Jakub Dziółka to join Jacek Paszulewicz's staff at GKS Katowice. As a match analyst and assistant coach, he also conducted training sessions for the senior team. During his three years in Katowice, he also worked under managers Dariusz Dudek and Rafał Górak.

=== Raków Częstochowa ===
On 14 June 2021, he was recruited by Ekstraklasa club Raków Częstochowa as their new assistant manager, working with Marek Papszun. During his tenure, Raków won the 2021–22 Polish Cup, the 2021 and 2022, and finished as runners-up in the 2021–22 league season. On 26 April 2023, while Raków was en route to their first ever top division title, and a week after Papszun confirmed he would be leaving the club at the end of the 2022–23 season, Szwarga was announced as his replacement.

Szwarga's first match as manager came on 11 July 2023, with Raków winning 1–0 over Estonian club Flora in the first qualifying round of the 2023–24 UEFA Champions League, followed by a 2023 Polish Super Cup loss to Legia Warsaw, 4–5 on penalties, four days later. In their European campaign, the defending Ekstraklasa champions eliminated Qarabağ and Aris Limassol, before falling short in the play-off round to Danish club Copenhagen, losing 1–2 on aggregate.

Having qualified for the group stage, Raków faced Atalanta (Italy), Sporting (Portugal) and Sturm Graz (Austria). They won once against Sturm Graz, drew at home to Sporting, and lost the remaining games, finishing their first European group stage in last place.

Under Szwarga, Raków failed to replicate their previous success in domestic competitions. Their Polish Cup run ended in the quarter-finals against Piast Gliwice, and Raków was unable to hold a top-three position in the league for more than two weeks, despite poor form from potential title rivals. On 9 April 2024, amid calls to replace Szwarga, Raków's owner Michał Świerczewski publicly expressed his and the club's support for the manager. Less than a month later, on 7 May, the club announced Szwarga would step down at the end of the 2023–24 season. On 14 June, Raków confirmed that he would return to the role of assistant under the returning Marek Papszun.

=== Arka Gdynia ===
On 6 October 2024, it was announced that Szwarga would leave the Silesian side at the conclusion of the summer/autumn round. Hours later, I liga club Arka Gdynia announced that he would take over as manager following his exit from Raków, replacing interim head coach Tomasz Grzegorczyk.

Szwarga began his tenure on 12 December 2024, with the team placed 2nd, five points behind leaders Bruk-Bet Termalica Nieciecza. Arka continued its run of good form under Szwarga, eventually clinching promotion to the top flight after a 2–1 home win over Bruk-Bet Termalica on 4 May 2025. They were crowned league champions following a 3–0 win over Stal Stalowa Wola on 25 May.

Arka entered the winter break of the 2025–26 league season with 21 points and 11th place in the table. Shortly after, Szwarga was reportedly close to resigning due to disagreements with the board over the club's strategy and limited transfer activity. He and Arka ultimately agreed to part ways on 25 March 2026.

=== Return to GKS Katowice ===
On 24 June 2026, Szwarga was appointed Rafał Górak's assistant at GKS Katowice, returning to the role, under the same manager, after five years.

=== Return to Raków Częstochowa ===
Szwarga returned to Raków Częstochowa on 21 October 2026 to take over as head coach until the end of the 2027–28 season, with an extension option. He was released from his GKS contract for a reported fee of €57,300 (PLN 250,000). He became Raków's third full-time manager since the start of the 2026–27 season, and the club's fourth in 2026. At the time of his appointment, Raków were placed last in the league table with six points after eleven games. Szwarga's first game back in charge of Raków ended in a 2–1 away loss against Wisła Kraków on 24 October.

== Managerial statistics ==
As of match played 22 November 2026

Managerial record by team and tenure
Team	From	To	Record							
Team	From	To	G	W	D	L	GF	GA	GD	Win %
Raków Częstochowa	28 May 2023	30 July 2024	52	22	14	16	72	58	+14	42.31
Arka Gdynia	12 December 2024	25 March 2026	43	18	11	14	49	55	−6	41.86
Raków Częstochowa	21 October 2026	Present	5	3	1	1	12	7	+5	60.00
Total			100	43	26	31	133	120	+13	43.00

== Honours ==
=== Player ===
Płomień Połomia

- Klasa A Rybnik: 2016–17

Unia Dąbrowa Górnicza

- Regional league Katowice IV: 2017–18

=== Managerial ===
Arka Gdynia

- I liga: 2024–25
