= Jakub Dziółka =

Polish footballer

Personal information
- Date of birth: 21 November 1980 (age 45)
- Place of birth: Chorzów, Poland
- Height: 2.00 m (6 ft 7 in)
- Position: Defender

Team information
- Current team: Cracovia (assistant)

Senior career*
Years	Team	Apps	(Gls)
2001–2005	Górnik Katowice		
2005–2006	Szczakowianka Jaworzno	26	(4)
2006–2009	Polonia Bytom	55	(1)
2009–2010	Victoria Jaworzno		
2010–2011	GKS Katowice	12	(1)
2011	Zagłębie Sosnowiec	9	(0)
2011–2012	Górnik Wesoła	26	(5)
2012	Szczakowianka Jaworzno	14	(3)
2013–2014	MKS Myszków	33	(8)

Managerial career
- 2013–2014: MKS Myszków (player-manager)
- 2015–2018: Skra Częstochowa
- 2018: GKS Katowice (caretaker)
- 2019: Górnik Mysłowice
- 2019–2020: Cracovia U18
- 2021–2023: Skra Częstochowa
- 2024–2025: ŁKS Łódź
- * Club domestic league appearances and goals

Jakub Dziółka (born 21 November 1980) is a Polish professional football manager and former player who played as a defender. He is currently the assistant manager of Ekstraklasa club Cracovia. He was one of the tallest footballers in Ekstraklasa during the 2007–08 season.

== Managerial career ==
After his playing career, Dziółka turned his focus to management. From 2015 to 2018, he was in charge of Skra Częstochowa, before holding various roles at GKS Katowice and Cracovia, with a short stint at Górnik Mysłowice in-between. On 5 July 2021, he rejoined Skra as manager.

On 19 June 2023, shortly after leaving his post at Skra, he joined Raków Częstochowa's staff as an assistant coach under Dawid Szwarga.

On 17 June 2024, Dziółka was revealed as the new manager of I liga club ŁKS Łódź. He was dismissed on 23 February 2025, hours after a 1–0 defeat to Miedź Legnica which left the team in 11th place.

On 5 March 2026, Dziółka joined ŁKS' rivals Widzew Łódź as an assistant under newly appointed head coach Aleksandar Vuković. He left Widzew on 11 September 2026, two days after Vuković was dismissed.

On 12 November 2026, Dziółka returned to Cracovia as an assistant manager, following Vuković's appointment as head coach the day before.

== Managerial statistics ==
As of match played 23 February 2025

Managerial record by team and tenure
Team	From	To	Record							
Team	From	To	G	W	D	L	GF	GA	GD	Win %
MKS Myszków	12 January 2013	24 June 2014	45	27	10	8	95	45	+50	60.00
Skra Częstochowa	20 July 2015	11 January 2018	93	48	28	17	184	85	+99	51.61
GKS Katowice (caretaker)	20 September 2018	15 October 2018	4	1	2	1	4	4	+0	25.00
Górnik Mysłowice	1 July 2019	30 September 2019	7	7	0	0	22	10	+12	100.00
Skra Częstochowa	5 July 2021	4 June 2023	70	17	18	35	48	97	−49	24.29
ŁKS Łódź	17 June 2024	23 February 2025	24	9	6	9	32	27	+5	37.50
Total			243	109	64	70	385	268	+117	44.86

== Honours ==
=== Player ===
Górnik Wesoła

- IV liga Silesia I: 2011–12

=== Player-manager ===
MKS Myszków

- Klasa A Częstochowa II: 2012–13
