= Bartosz Nowak =

Polish footballer

Personal information
- Date of birth: 25 August 1993 (age 33)
- Place of birth: Radom, Poland
- Height: 1.80 m (5 ft 11 in)
- Position: Midfielder

Team information
- Current team: GKS Katowice
- Number: 27

Youth career
- Junior Radom
- 2005: PKS Makowiec
- 2008–2009: Młodzik 18 Radom
- 2009–2011: Gwarek Zabrze

Senior career*
| Years | Team | Apps | (Gls) |
| 2011–2012 | Gwarek Zabrze | | |
| 2012–2014 | Polonia Bytom | 33 | (8) |
| 2014–2017 | Miedź Legnica | 10 | (0) |
| 2014–2016 | → Stal Mielec (loan) | 48 | (14) |
| 2016–2017 | → Ruch Chorzów (loan) | 17 | (1) |
| 2017–2018 | Ruch Chorzów | 17 | (2) |
| 2018 | → Stal Mielec (loan) | 15 | (6) |
| 2018–2020 | Stal Mielec | 68 | (23) |
| 2020–2022 | Górnik Zabrze | 65 | (14) |
| 2022–2024 | Raków Częstochowa | 62 | (17) |
| 2024– | GKS Katowice | 76 | (18) |
- * Club domestic league appearances and goals as of 19:01, 11 November 2026 (UTC)

Bartosz Nowak (born 25 August 1993) is a Polish professional footballer who plays as a midfielder for Ekstraklasa club GKS Katowice. Previously, he played for clubs such as Ruch Chorzów, Stal Mielec, Górnik Zabrze and Raków Częstochowa.

== Club career ==
=== Early career ===
Born in Radom, Nowak began playing football with local clubs Junior Radom, PKS Makowiec and Młodzik 18 Radom. In 2009, he joined the youth system of Gwarek Zabrze, where he subsequently made his first appearances in senior football.

=== Polonia Bytom and Miedź Legnica ===
In 2012, Nowak joined Polonia Bytom. He made 16 league appearances and scored twice during his first season, which ended with Polonia's relegation from the I liga. During the first half of the following campaign, he scored six goals in 17 II liga appearances.

Nowak moved to Miedź Legnica during the 2013–14 season. He made ten league appearances for the club before leaving on loan in search of regular first-team football.

=== Stal Mielec and Ruch Chorzów ===
Nowak joined Stal Mielec on loan in 2014. Over the following two seasons he made 48 league appearances and scored 14 goals. In the 2015–16 season, Stal won the II liga and earned promotion to the I liga.

For the 2016–17 season, he was loaned to Ruch Chorzów, where he made his Ekstraklasa debut. He recorded 17 league appearances and one goal during the campaign. After subsequently joining Ruch on a permanent basis, he played a further 17 league matches and scored twice during the first half of the 2017–18 season.

In January 2018, Nowak returned to Stal Mielec on loan. The transfer was made permanent later that year. During the 2019 calendar year, he scored 12 goals and registered 14 assists in 36 league appearances, performances which earned him the Piłka Nożna I liga Player of the Year award.

In the 2019–20 season, Nowak scored 13 league goals as Stal won the I liga championship and returned to the Ekstraklasa after a 24-year absence. Across his spells with the club, he made 116 league appearances and scored 43 goals.

=== Górnik Zabrze ===
Following Stal's promotion, Nowak joined Górnik Zabrze in August 2020. He scored five goals in 29 league appearances during his first season and was named the Ekstraklasa Player of the Month for September 2020.

Nowak scored eight league goals in the 2021–22 campaign. He began the following season with Górnik before leaving in August 2022. In total, he made 71 appearances in all competitions for the club, scoring 15 goals.

=== Raków Częstochowa ===
On 3 August 2022, Nowak signed for Raków Częstochowa on a contract running until June 2025, with an option for an additional year. He scored ten goals in 29 league appearances during the 2022–23 season as Raków won the first Ekstraklasa championship in the club's history.

During the 2023–24 campaign, Nowak made nine appearances in European competition as Raków progressed through the UEFA Champions League qualifying rounds and reached the group stage of the UEFA Europa League. He also scored seven goals in 33 league appearances. His two seasons with Raków produced 82 appearances and 18 goals in all competitions.

=== GKS Katowice ===
On 23 July 2024, Nowak transferred permanently to newly promoted Ekstraklasa club GKS Katowice, signing a contract until June 2027. He made his debut four days later. During the 2024–25 season, he recorded 28 league appearances, two goals and seven assists as GKS finished eighth in its first season back in the top division.

Nowak took on a more prominent role in the following campaign. In January 2026, he was named League Player of the Year for 2025 in Piłka Nożna's annual awards. On 2 February 2026, he signed a new contract with GKS, extending his stay until 30 June 2029.

He finished the 2025–26 league season with nine goals in 34 appearances and helped GKS secure fifth place and qualification for European competition. He also scored five goals in five Polish Cup matches, finishing as the competition's joint top scorer. At the Ekstraklasa end-of-season awards, Nowak was named both Player of the Season and Midfielder of the Season.

In July 2026, he appeared in GKS Katowice's first European tie in more than two decades. He registered two assists in a 3–1 victory over MŠK Žilina, which gave GKS a 4–3 aggregate win in the second qualifying round of the 2026–27 UEFA Conference League.

== Career statistics ==
As of match played 8 November 2026

Appearances and goals by club, season and competition
| Club | Season | League | | | Polish Cup | | Europe | | Other | | Total | |
| Club | Season | Division | Apps | Goals | Apps | Goals | Apps | Goals | Apps | Goals | Apps | Goals |
|---|---|---|---|---|---|---|---|---|---|---|---|---|
| Polonia Bytom | 2012–13 | I liga | 16 | 2 | 0 | 0 | — | | — | | 16 | 2 |
| Polonia Bytom | 2013–14 | II liga | 17 | 6 | 1 | 0 | — | | — | | 18 | 6 |
| Polonia Bytom | Total | | 33 | 8 | 1 | 0 | — | | — | | 34 | 8 |
| Miedź Legnica | 2013–14 | I liga | 7 | 0 | 1 | 0 | — | | — | | 8 | 0 |
| Miedź Legnica | 2014–15 | I liga | 3 | 0 | 0 | 0 | — | | — | | 3 | 0 |
| Miedź Legnica | Total | | 10 | 0 | 1 | 0 | — | | — | | 11 | 0 |
| Stal Mielec (loan) | 2014–15 | II liga | 15 | 7 | — | | — | | — | | 15 | 7 |
| Stal Mielec (loan) | 2015–16 | II liga | 33 | 7 | 1 | 0 | — | | — | | 34 | 7 |
| Stal Mielec (loan) | Total | | 48 | 14 | 1 | 0 | — | | — | | 49 | 14 |
| Ruch Chorzów (loan) | 2016–17 | Ekstraklasa | 17 | 1 | 2 | 0 | — | | — | | 19 | 1 |
| Ruch Chorzów | 2017–18 | I liga | 17 | 2 | 1 | 0 | — | | — | | 18 | 2 |
| Ruch Chorzów | Total | | 34 | 3 | 3 | 0 | — | | — | | 37 | 3 |
| Stal Mielec (loan) | 2017–18 | I liga | 15 | 6 | — | | — | | — | | 15 | 6 |
| Stal Mielec | 2018–19 | I liga | 34 | 10 | 0 | 0 | — | | — | | 34 | 10 |
| Stal Mielec | 2019–20 | I liga | 34 | 13 | 4 | 1 | — | | — | | 38 | 14 |
| Stal Mielec | Total | | 83 | 29 | 4 | 1 | — | | — | | 87 | 30 |
| Górnik Zabrze | 2020–21 | Ekstraklasa | 29 | 5 | 3 | 1 | — | | — | | 32 | 6 |
| Górnik Zabrze | 2021–22 | Ekstraklasa | 34 | 8 | 3 | 0 | — | | — | | 37 | 8 |
| Górnik Zabrze | 2022–23 | Ekstraklasa | 2 | 1 | — | | — | | — | | 2 | 1 |
| Górnik Zabrze | Total | | 65 | 14 | 6 | 1 | — | | — | | 71 | 15 |
| Raków Częstochowa | 2022–23 | Ekstraklasa | 29 | 10 | 5 | 1 | 3 (Note: Appearances in UEFA Conference League) | 0 | — | | 37 | 11 |
| Raków Częstochowa | 2023–24 | Ekstraklasa | 33 | 7 | 3 | 0 | 9 (Note: Four appearances in UEFA Champions League, five appearances in UEFA Europa League) | 0 | 0 | 0 | 45 | 7 |
| Raków Częstochowa | Total | | 62 | 17 | 8 | 1 | 12 | 0 | 0 | 0 | 82 | 18 |
| GKS Katowice | 2024–25 | Ekstraklasa | 28 | 2 | 1 | 0 | — | | — | | 29 | 2 |
| GKS Katowice | 2025–26 | Ekstraklasa | 34 | 9 | 5 | 5 | — | | — | | 39 | 14 |
| GKS Katowice | 2026–27 | Ekstraklasa | 14 | 7 | 1 | 0 | 4 | 0 | — | | 19 | 7 |
| GKS Katowice | Total | | 76 | 18 | 7 | 5 | 4 | 0 | — | | 87 | 23 |
| Career total | | | 411 | 103 | 31 | 8 | 16 | 0 | 0 | 0 | 458 | 111 |

== Honours ==
Stal Mielec

- I liga: 2019–20
- II liga: 2015–16

Raków Częstochowa

- Ekstraklasa: 2022–23

Individual

- Ekstraklasa Player of the Year: 2025
- Ekstraklasa Player of the Season: 2025–26
- Ekstraklasa Midfielder of the Season: 2025–26
- I liga Player of the Year: 2019
- Polish Cup top scorer: 2025–26
- Ekstraklasa Player of the Month: September 2020, August 2022, February 2026, October 2026
