= GKS Katowice Stadium =

Football stadium in Poland

Coordinates: 50°16′47.09″N 19°00′04.33″E

- Blaszok
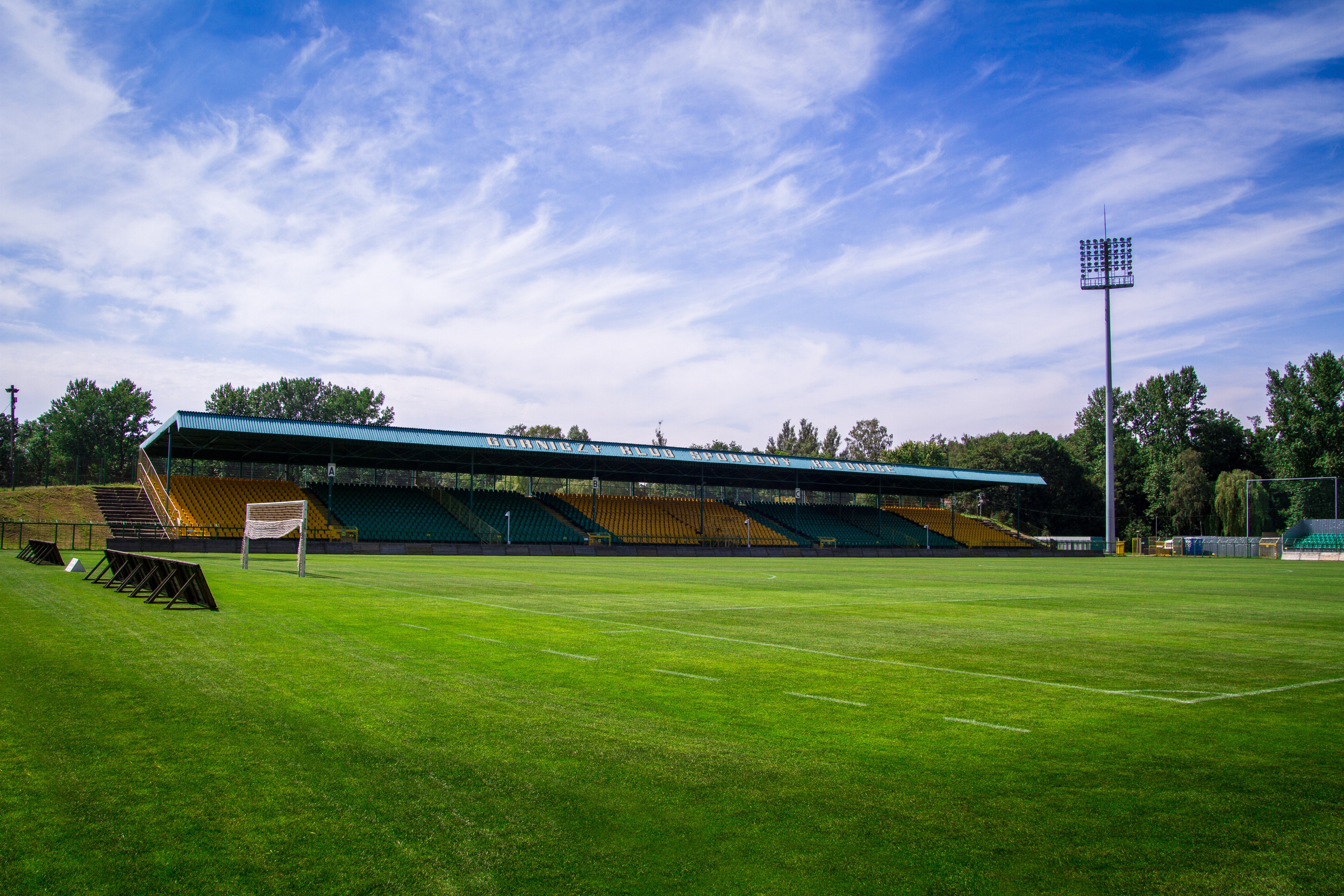
- Interactive map of GKS Katowice Stadium
- Location: Katowice, Poland
- Capacity: 6,710

Construction
- Opened: 1955
- Renovated: 1959–1960, 1986–1987, 2008–2012

Tenants
- GKS Katowice men's (until 2025); GKS Katowice women's

The GKS Katowice Stadium is a football stadium at Silesian Culture and Recreation Park in Chorzów (just at the border with Katowice), Poland. It currently serves as the home ground of GKS Katowice's women's team. The stadium also hosted GKS Katowice's men's team (until 2025) and three matches of Poland national football team. The venue holds 6,710 people and was built in 1955.
