= Mariusz Misiura =

Polish football manager (born 1981)

Personal information
- Date of birth: 1 June 1981 (age 45)
- Place of birth: Szczecin, Poland
- Height: 1.81 m (5 ft 11 in)
- Position: Midfielder

Team information
- Current team: Motor Lublin (manager)

Youth career
- Salos Szczecin

Senior career*
Years	Team	Apps	(Gls)
2001–2004	Pogoń Szczecin II		
2002–2004	Pogoń Szczecin	11	(0)
2002	→ Znicz Pruszków (loan)		
2004	Gwardia Koszalin		
2004–2005	ŁKS Łomża		
2005–2006	Świt Nowy Dwór Mazowiecki	21	(0)
2006	Türkiyemspor Berlin		
2007	Pogoń Szczecin Nowa		
2007–2008	Pogoń Szczecin II		
2009	Stal Szczecin		
2011	Osadnik Myślibórz		
2013	Hetman Grzybno		

Managerial career
- 2007–2013: Pogoń Szczecin (women)
- 2010–2012: Poland (women) (assistant)
- 2014–2017: Blau-Weiß Hohen Neuendorf (women)
- 2020–2021: Warta Gorzów Wielkopolski
- 2021–2024: Znicz Pruszków
- 2024–2026: Wisła Płock
- 2026–: Motor Lublin
- * Club domestic league appearances and goals

Mariusz Misiura (born 1 June 1981) is a Polish professional football manager and former player who currently manages Ekstraklasa club Motor Lublin.

== Managerial statistics ==
As of match played 6 November 2026

Managerial record by team and tenure
Team	From	To	Record							
Team	From	To	G	W	D	L	GF	GA	GD	Win %
Warta Gorzów Wielkopolski	11 August 2020	30 June 2021	39	13	6	20	57	54	+3	33.33
Znicz Pruszków	1 July 2021	31 May 2024	106	40	23	43	125	133	−8	37.74
Wisła Płock	1 June 2024	16 June 2026	72	32	20	20	98	82	+16	44.44
Motor Lublin	18 June 2026	Present	16	6	5	5	26	25	+1	37.50
Total			233	91	54	88	306	294	+12	39.06

== Honours ==
=== Managerial ===
Pogoń Szczecin (women)

- I liga North: 2009–10

Blau-Weiß Hohen Neuendorf

- Frauen-Regionalliga Nordost: 2014–15

Individual

- Ekstraklasa Coach of the Month: July 2025
