= Robert Kolendowicz =

Polish footballer (born 1980)

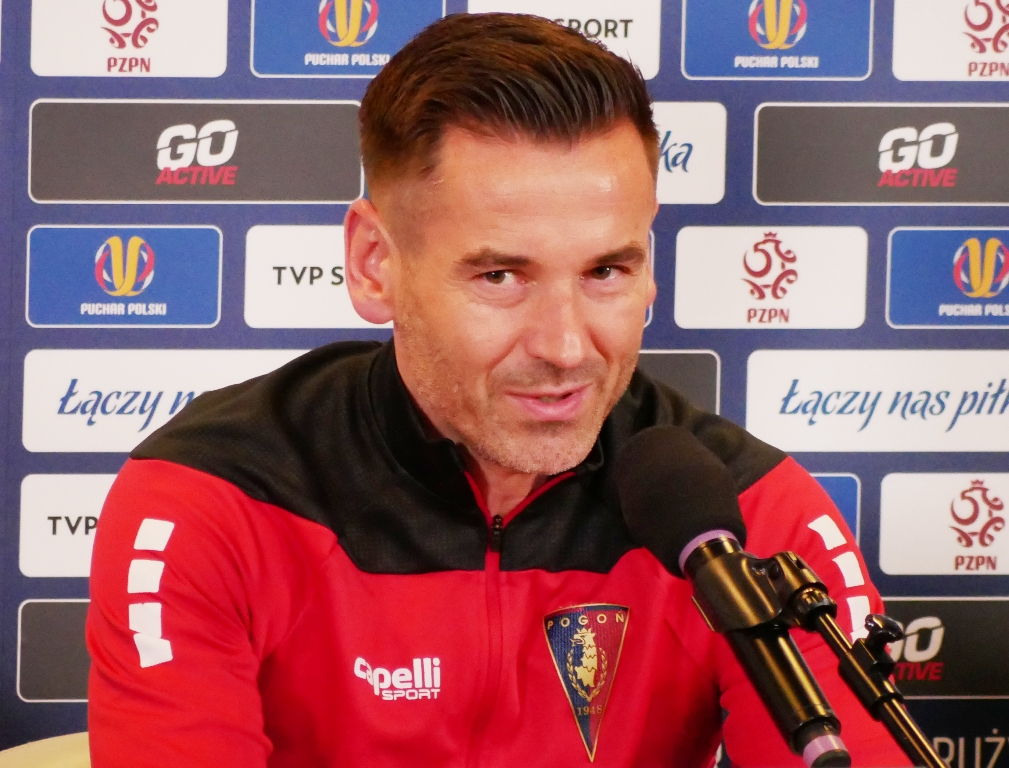
- Kolendowicz as manager of Pogoń Szczecin in 2025

Personal information
- Date of birth: 26 September 1980 (age 46)
- Place of birth: Poznań, Poland
- Height: 1.74 m (5 ft 9 in)
- Position: Midfielder

Team information
- Current team: Korona Kielce (manager)

Youth career
- MKS Chocicza
- SKS 13 Poznań
- MKS Chocicza
- Olimpia Poznań

Senior career*
Years	Team	Apps	(Gls)
1997–1998	Amica Wronki	0	(0)
1998	Lech Poznań	3	(0)
1999	Warta Poznań		
1999	RRC Heirnis Gent		
2000–2004	GKS Bełchatów	94	(4)
2001	→ Dyskobolia Grodzisk (loan)	2	(0)
2005–2006	Korona Kielce	19	(0)
2006	ŁKS Łódź	14	(1)
2007–2010	Zagłębie Lubin	66	(2)
2010	Odra Wodzisław	9	(0)
2010–2013	Pogoń Szczecin	77	(8)
2013–2015	Flota Świnoujście	19	(0)
2015–2016	Mewa Resko	7	(0)

International career
2006	Poland	1	(0)

Managerial career
- 2024–2025: Pogoń Szczecin
- 2026–: Korona Kielce
- * Club domestic league appearances and goals

Robert Kolendowicz (Polish pronunciation: [ˈrɔ.bɛrt ˌkɔ.lɛn.ˈdɔ.vʲit͡ʂ]; born 26 September 1980) is a Polish professional football manager and former player who played as a midfielder. He is currently in charge of Ekstraklasa club Korona Kielce.

== International career ==
Kolendowicz made one appearance for the Poland national team on 6 December 2006, as a second-half substitute in a 5–2 friendly win over United Arab Emirates.

== Managerial career ==
In 2015, Kolendowicz joined Pogoń Szczecin's academy as a youth coordinator. He held this position until 2018, when he joined the first-team coaching staff as an assistant. In March 2024, he obtained the UEFA Pro coaching license.

On 15 August 2024, Kolendowicz took on his first senior managerial role after being appointed manager of Pogoń, replacing the outgoing Jens Gustafsson. In Kolendowicz's first season in charge, Pogoń finished the league season in 4th and reached the 2024–25 Polish Cup final. On 16 September 2025, he was sacked after a lackluster start to the 2025–26 season.

On 20 October 2026, Kolendowicz was appointed manager of another Ekstraklasa side Korona Kielce until the end of the season with an option to extend, returning to the club he represented as a player from 2005 to 2006. He managed his first game as Korona manager in a 1–0 home win over GKS Katowice on 24 October.

== Managerial statistics ==
As of match played 20 November 2026

Managerial record by team and tenure
Team	From	To	Record							
Team	From	To	G	W	D	L	GF	GA	GD	Win %
Pogoń Szczecin	15 August 2024	16 September 2025	44	23	7	14	80	58	+22	52.27
Korona Kielce	20 October 2026	Present	5	1	0	4	2	7	−5	20.00
Total			49	24	7	18	82	65	+17	48.98

== Honours ==
=== Player ===
Zagłębie Lubin

- Ekstraklasa: 2006–07

=== Manager ===
Pogoń Szczecin

- Ekstraklasa Coach of the Month: February 2025
