= Arkadiusz Jędrych =

Polish footballer (born 1992)

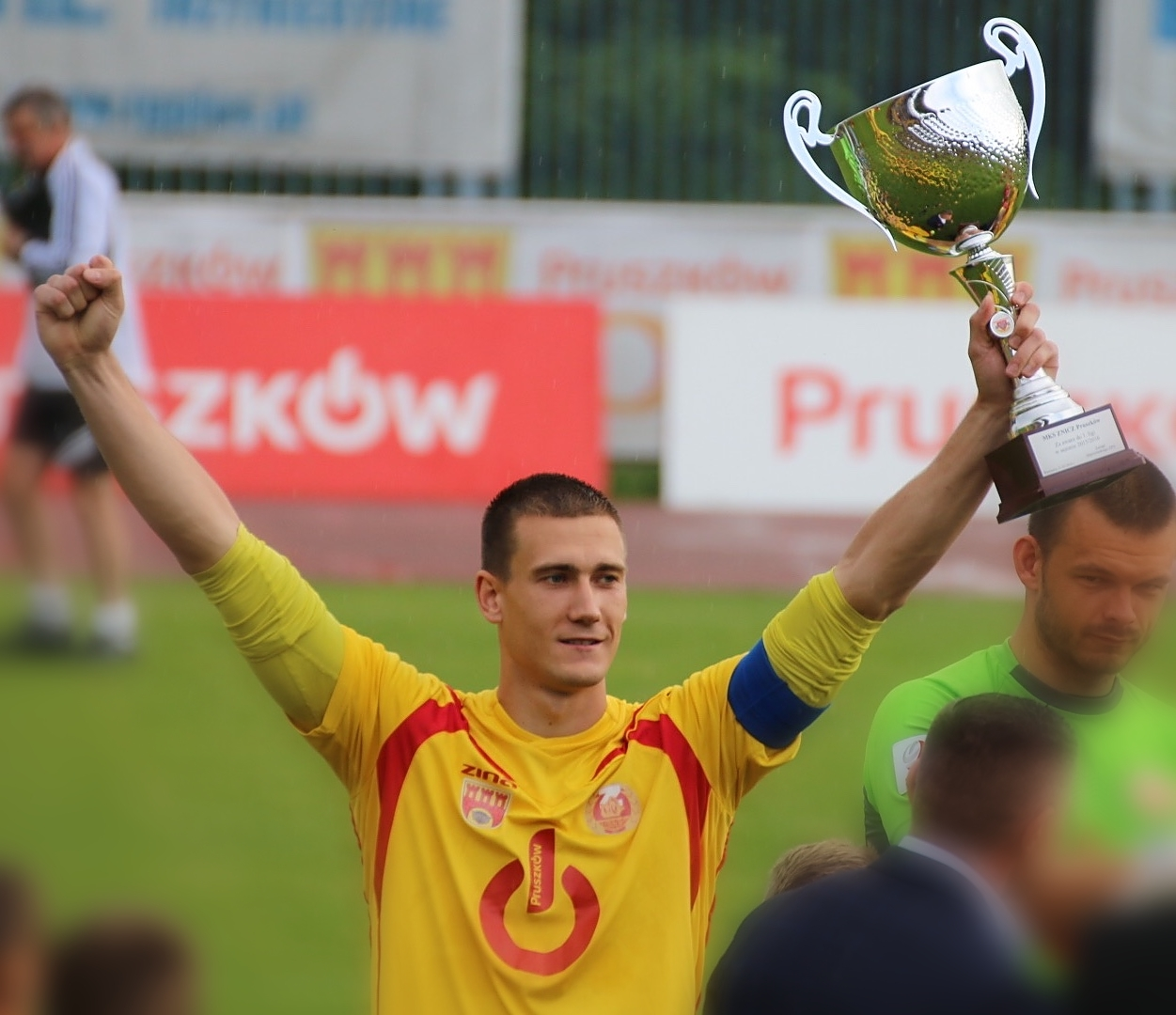
- Jędrych with Znicz Pruszków in 2016

Personal information
- Date of birth: 27 May 1992 (age 34)
- Place of birth: Pruszków, Poland
- Height: 1.93 m (6 ft 4 in)
- Position: Centre-back

Team information
- Current team: GKS Katowice
- Number: 4

Youth career
- Znicz Pruszków

Senior career*
Years	Team	Apps	(Gls)
2011–2016	Znicz Pruszków	162	(24)
2016–2017	Pogoń Siedlce	32	(0)
2017–2019	Zagłębie Sosnowiec	50	(1)
2019–	GKS Katowice	254	(44)

International career
2011	Poland U21	1	(0)
- * Club domestic league appearances and goals as of 12:37, 13 September 2026 (UTC)

Arkadiusz Jędrych (born 27 May 1992) is a Polish professional footballer who plays as a centre-back for and captains Ekstraklasa club GKS Katowice.

== Club career ==
=== Znicz Pruszków ===
Jędrych is a youth product of his hometown club Znicz Pruszków. He progressed through the club's academy and made his senior debut in April 2010.

He became a regular member of the first team and spent six seasons at the club. Primarily a centre-back, he also established himself as a goalscoring defender, particularly from set pieces and penalty kicks. In league competition, he made 162 appearances and scored 24 goals for Znicz.

During the 2015–16 season, Jędrych made 29 league appearances and scored six goals as Znicz earned promotion from the II liga to the I liga.

=== Pogoń Siedlce ===
On 22 June 2016, Jędrych joined I liga club Pogoń Siedlce on a one-year contract. At the time of his transfer, the club described him as a central defender and a long-standing first-team player of Znicz Pruszków.

He was a regular starter during his only season in Siedlce, making 32 league appearances. He left the club after the 2016–17 campaign.

=== Zagłębie Sosnowiec ===
Jędrych agreed to join Zagłębie Sosnowiec from 1 July 2017, signing a two-year contract.

In his first season with Zagłębie, he helped the club earn promotion to the Ekstraklasa. He subsequently made 17 top-flight appearances during the first half of the 2018–19 season. Across all competitions, Jędrych played 53 matches for Zagłębie, including 33 in the I liga, 17 in the Ekstraklasa and three in the Polish Cup. He scored one goal for the club.

=== GKS Katowice ===
On 29 January 2019, Jędrych completed a permanent transfer from Zagłębie Sosnowiec to GKS Katowice. He initially signed a contract running until June 2021.

GKS were relegated from the I liga at the end of his first half-season with the club. Jędrych remained in Katowice and became an important member of the side that competed for promotion from the II liga. He also became the team's captain.

In the 2020–21 season, GKS Katowice finished second in the II liga and secured promotion to the I liga. The promotion was confirmed on 7 June 2021 following a 4–1 victory over Stal Rzeszów.

Jędrych continued to be a regular starter and an important goalscorer despite playing in defence. His goals frequently came from penalties and attacking set pieces. During the 2023–24 I liga season, he scored 11 league goals as GKS Katowice secured direct promotion to the Ekstraklasa.

The promotion marked GKS Katowice's return to the top division after a 19-year absence. Jędrych was later selected for the Polish Union of Footballers' I liga Team of the Season for the 2023–24 campaign.

In the 2024–25 season, Jędrych captained GKS during the club's first campaign back in the Ekstraklasa. He remained a first-choice centre-back and helped the newly promoted side establish itself in the division.

By May 2026, Jędrych had made 260 appearances in all competitions for GKS Katowice, placing him among the players with the highest number of appearances in the club's history.

He had also scored 45 goals for the club by April 2026, moving into joint ninth place in GKS Katowice's all-time goalscoring ranking.

On 1 August 2026, Jędrych signed a new contract with GKS Katowice running until 30 June 2028, with an option for a further one-year extension.

== International career ==
In 2011, Jędrych made one appearance for the Poland under-21 national team.

== Style of play ==
Jędrych plays primarily as a centre-back. In addition to his defensive duties, he is known for his goalscoring record, particularly from penalty kicks, headers and set-piece situations. During his time with GKS Katowice, he became one of the club's highest-scoring defenders and regularly served as the team's penalty taker.

== Honours ==
Individual

- Polish Union of Footballers' I liga Team of the Season: 2023–24
