= Arena Katowice =

Football stadium in Poland

Coordinates: 50.2514°N 18.9751°E

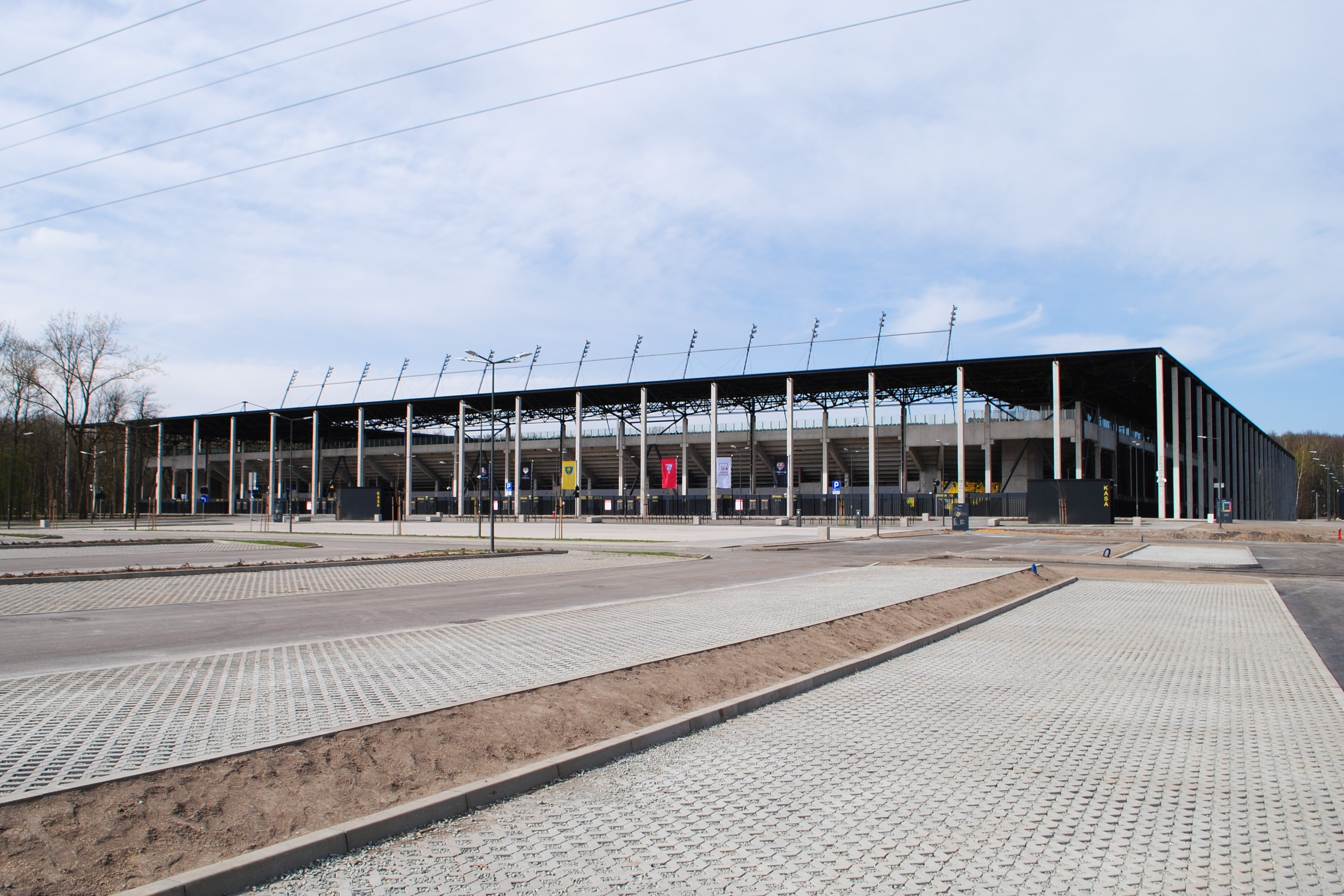
- Interactive map of Arena Katowice
- Full name: Stadion Miejski w Katowicach im. Jana Furtoka
- Location: Katowice, ul. Nowa Bukowa 1 40-803
- Owner: City of Katowice
- Capacity: 15,048
- Surface: Grass
- Record attendance: 15,048; GKS – Górnik Zabrze; 30 March 2025
- Field size: 105 x 68 m

Construction
- Built: 2021–2025
- Opened: 30 March 2025
- Cost: = c. 268 million zl

Tenant
- GKS Katowice

The Arena Katowice, officially known as Stadion Miejski im. Jana Furtoka (English: Jan Furtok Municipal Stadium), is a football stadium in Katowice, Poland. It is the home ground of GKS Katowice. The venue holds 15,048 people and was opened in 2025.

== Football stadium ==
The stadium's capacity of 15,048 makes it the main venue of the complex. It hosts GKS Katowice. The stadium reaches the highest requirements in the UEFA stadium categories, meaning they can host all major tournaments.

The first official match was played there on 30 March 2025, when GKS Katowice took on local rivals Górnik Zabrze in an Ekstraklasa game, which was watched by 15,048 spectators. The stadium was selected as one of the host venues for the 2026 FIFA U-20 Women's World Cup hosted in Poland.

In September 2026, the Katowice city council voted to name the stadium after club legend Jan Furtok.

== Indoor arena ==
The complex also consists of an indoor arena which is located right next to the stadium. The arena holds a capacity of 3,002, and also meets the highest requirements of not just FIFA and UEFA, but also the FIVB, and IHF.
