= Rafał Górak =

Polish footballer and manager (born 1973)

Personal information
- Date of birth: 30 March 1973 (age 53)
- Place of birth: Bytom, Poland
- Height: 1.83 m (6 ft 0 in)
- Position: Defender

Team information
- Current team: GKS Katowice (manager)

Youth career
- Polonia Bytom

Senior career*
Years	Team	Apps	(Gls)
1993–1995	Polonia Bytom		
1995–1996	Rymer Niedobczyce		
1996	Kalwarianka Kalwaria Zebrzydowska		
1997	Górnik Wojkowice		
1997–1999	Polonia/Szombierki Bytom		
1999–2001	Polonia Bytom		
2001–2005	Szczakowianka Jaworzno		
2005–2006	Ruch Radzionków		

Managerial career
- 2006–2010: Ruch Radzionków
- 2011: GKS Tychy
- 2011–2013: GKS Katowice
- 2013–2017: BKS Stal Bielsko-Biała
- 2017–2019: Elana Toruń
- 2019–: GKS Katowice
- * Club domestic league appearances and goals

Rafał Górak (born 30 March 1973) is a Polish professional football manager and former player who played as a defender. He is currently the manager of Ekstraklasa club GKS Katowice.

== Playing career ==
Górak began his playing career with his hometown club Polonia Bytom. He later represented Rymer Niedobczyce, Kalwarianka Kalwaria Zebrzydowska and Górnik Wojkowice, before playing for a combined Polonia and Szombierki Bytom side. He returned to Polonia Bytom in 1999.

In 2001, Górak joined Szczakowianka Jaworzno. He was part of the team that competed in the top tier of Polish football and later finished his playing career with Ruch Radzionków.

== Managerial career ==
=== Ruch Radzionków ===
Górak began his managerial career with Ruch Radzionków in 2006. Under his management, the club won the Silesia I group of the fourth tier in the 2006–07 season and the Opole–Silesia group of the III liga in 2008–09.

In the 2009–10 season, Ruch won the western group of the II liga and earned promotion to the second tier of Polish football. Górak left the club in December 2010.

=== GKS Tychy and first spell at GKS Katowice ===
On 1 April 2011, Górak became manager of GKS Tychy. He left the club in June 2011 to take charge of GKS Katowice.

During his first spell with GKS Katowice, he managed the team in the second tier of Polish football. His tenure ended in August 2013.

=== BKS Stal Bielsko-Biała ===
In December 2013, Górak was appointed manager of BKS Stal Bielsko-Biała. He remained in charge until April 2017.

=== Elana Toruń ===
Górak became manager of Elana Toruń in April 2017. In the 2017–18 season, he led the club to the III liga Group II championship and promotion to the II liga. Elana also won the Kuyavia-Pomerania regional Polish Cup during the same campaign.

He left Elana in June 2019 to return to GKS Katowice.

=== Return to GKS Katowice ===
Górak returned to GKS Katowice in June 2019, following the club's relegation to the II liga. In the 2020–21 season, he led the club to promotion to the I liga.

In the 2023–24 season, GKS Katowice finished second in the I liga and secured direct promotion to the Ekstraklasa. The promotion marked the club's return to the highest level of Polish football after a 19-year absence.

In the 2024–25 season, Górak led GKS Katowice to an eighth-place finish in the club's first campaign back in the Ekstraklasa.

In July 2025, he signed a new contract with GKS Katowice, extending his agreement with the club until 2028.

== Managerial statistics ==
As of match played 22 November 2026

Managerial record by team and tenure
Team	From	To	Record							
Team	From	To	G	W	D	L	GF	GA	GD	Win %
Ruch Radzionków	June 2006	21 December 2010	169	117	26	26	375	122	+253	69.23
GKS Tychy	1 April 2011	21 June 2011	15	10	2	3	30	13	+17	66.67
GKS Katowice	21 June 2011	22 August 2013	76	26	22	28	85	86	−1	34.21
BKS Stal Bielsko-Biała	2 December 2013	10 April 2017	110	60	27	23	218	89	+129	54.55
Elana Toruń	10 April 2017	3 June 2019	87	51	19	17	173	84	+89	58.62
GKS Katowice	3 June 2019	Present	278	122	67	89	439	352	+87	43.88
Total			735	386	163	186	1,320	746	+574	52.52

== Honours ==
=== Manager ===
Ruch Radzionków

- II liga West: 2009–10
- III liga: 2006–07 (Silesia I), 2008–09 (Opole-Silesia)
- Polish Cup (Silesia regionals): 2008–09
- Polish Cup (Bytom regionals): 2006–07, 2007–08, 2008–09

Elana Toruń

- III liga, group II: 2017–18
- Polish Cup (Kuyavia-Pomerania regionals): 2017–18

Individual

- I liga Coach of the Month: February & March 2024, May 2024
