= 2020–21 MKS Cracovia season =

Cracovia
2020–21 season
- Chairman: Janusz Filipiak
- Manager: Michał Probierz
- Stadium: Marshal Józef Piłsudski Stadium
- Ekstraklasa: 14th
- Polish Cup: Semi-finals
- Polish Super Cup: Winners
- UEFA Europa League: First qualifying round
- Top goalscorer: League: Pelle van Amersfoort (6 goals); All: Pelle van Amersfoort (8 goals)
- Biggest win: Polish Cup: Chojniczanka 0–3 Cracovia (3 March 2021)
- Biggest defeat: Ekstraklasa: Cracovia 0–3 Lechia (19 December 2020)
| Home colours | Away colours |

Cracovia competed in Ekstraklasa and this season's edition of the Polish Cup. They competed in the UEFA Europa League qualifying phase, when they were eliminated by Malmö FF, following the 0–2 defeat and won the Polish Super Cup, following the 5–4 penalty victory over Legia Warsaw.

They started their Ekstraklasa season with the 5 points deduction for match-fixing during the 2003–04 II liga season.

== Players ==
As of 5 October 2020

Note: Flags indicate national team as defined under FIFA eligibility rules; some limited exceptions apply. Players may hold more than one non-FIFA nationality.

| No. | Pos. | Nation | Player |
|---|---|---|---|
| 2 | DF | ROU | Cornel Râpă |
| 3 | DF | SVK | Michal Sipľak |
| 4 | MF | ROU | Sergiu Hanca (captain) |
| 5 | DF | ESP | Iván Márquez |
| 6 | MF | POL | Sylwester Lusiusz |
| 7 | FW | BRA | Rivaldinho |
| 8 | MF | SVK | Milan Dimun |
| 9 | FW | GER | Marcos Álvarez |
| 10 | MF | NED | Pelle van Amersfoort |
| 11 | MF | POL | Mateusz Wdowiak |
| 13 | MF | POL | Radosław Kanach |
| 14 | MF | CRO | Ivan Fiolić (on loan from Genk) |
| 16 | FW | POL | Przemysław Kapek |
| 19 | MF | BIH | Damir Sadiković |
| 21 | MF | BRA | Thiago |
| 22 | MF | KOS | Florian Loshaj |
| 23 | GK | POL | Karol Niemczycki |

| No. | Pos. | Nation | Player |
|---|---|---|---|
| 24 | FW | POL | Jakub Gut |
| 26 | FW | POL | Filip Piszczek |
| 29 | MF | SRB | Bojan Čečarić |
| 30 | GK | POL | Adam Wilk |
| 31 | GK | SVK | Lukáš Hroššo |
| 33 | DF | POL | Kamil Pestka |
| 34 | DF | UKR | Oleksiy Dytyatev |
| 40 | GK | SVK | Michal Peškovič |
| 44 | DF | POL | Dawid Szymonowicz (on loan from Jagiellonia) |
| 73 | FW | POL | Patryk Zaucha |
| 77 | FW | POL | Sebastian Strózik |
| 87 | DF | BUL | Diego Ferraresso |
| 88 | DF | CRO | Matej Rodin |
| 90 | DF | GER | Michael Gardawski |
| 97 | MF | POL | Daniel Pik |
| 99 | FW | SVK | Tomáš Vestenický |

== Competitions ==
=== Ekstraklasa ===
==== Standings ====
| Pos | Team | Pld | W | D | L | GF | GA | GD | Pts | Qualification or relegation |
|---|---|---|---|---|---|---|---|---|---|---|
| 12 | Wisła Płock | 30 | 8 | 9 | 13 | 37 | 44 | −7 | 33 (Note: Head-to-head matches: Wisła Kraków 0–3 Wisła Płock, Wisła Płock 1–3 Wisła Kraków.) | |
| 13 | Wisła Kraków | 30 | 8 | 9 | 13 | 39 | 42 | −3 | 33 | |
| 14 | Cracovia (Note: Cracovia was deducted 5 points for match-fixing during the 2003–04 II liga season (second tier at the time).) | 30 | 8 | 13 | 9 | 28 | 32 | −4 | 32 | |
| 15 | Stal Mielec | 30 | 6 | 11 | 13 | 31 | 47 | −16 | 29 | |
| 16 | Podbeskidzie Bielsko-Biała (R) | 30 | 6 | 7 | 17 | 29 | 60 | −31 | 25 | Relegation to I liga |

Source: ekstraklasa.org
Rules for classification: 1) Points; 2) Head-to-head points; 3) Head-to-head goal difference; 4) Head-to-head goals scored; 5) Head-to-head away goals scored (only if between two teams); 6) Goal difference; 7) Goals scored; 8) Number of wins; 9) Number of away wins; 10) Fairplay ranking; 11) Draw
(R) Relegated

==== Matches ====
| 22 August 2020 1 | Cracovia | 2 - 1 | Pogoń Szczecin | Kraków |
| 15:00 CET | Álvarez (yellow card) 18' (goal) 58'; van Amersfoort (yellow card) 31'; Hanca 62'; Vestenický (yellow card) 90+1' | Report | Dąbrowski (yellow card) 8'; Triantafyllopoulos (yellow card) 35'; Frączczak 57'; Matynia (yellow card) 77' | Stadium: Stadion Miejski im. Józefa Piłsudskiego; Attendance: 4,053; Referee: (Poland) Paweł Raczkowski |

| 30 August 2020 2 | Podbeskidzie | 2 - 2 | Cracovia | Bielsko-Biała |
| 15:00 CET | Danielak 16'; Szymon Mroczko (yellow card) 32'; Biliński (yellow card) 55'; Komor 58'; Ubbink (yellow card) 73' | Report | Jablonský 45'; Vestenický 81' | Stadium: Stadion Miejski; Attendance: 4,308; Referee: (Poland) Jarosław Przybył |

| 12 September 2020 3 | Cracovia | 1 - 1 | Stal Mielec | Kraków |
| 15:00 CET | Iván Márquez (yellow card) 85'; Szymonowicz 90+11' | Report | Flis (yellow card) 29'; Forsell (yellow card) 62'; Matras (yellow card) 67'; Tomczyk 82'; Robert Dadok (yellow card) 84' | Stadium: Stadion Miejski im. Józefa Piłsudskiego; Attendance: 5,439; Referee: (Poland) Tomasz Kwiatkowski |

| 20 September 2020 4 | Zagłębie Lubin | 1 - 1 | Cracovia | Lubin |
| 15:00 CET | Šimić 67'; Guldan (yellow card) 75'; Balić (yellow card) 90+3' | Report | Rivaldinho 48'; Fiolić (yellow card) 72' | Stadium: Zagłębie Lubin Stadium; Attendance: 2,533; Referee: (Poland) Szymon Marciniak |

| 26 September 2020 5 | Cracovia | 2 - 2 | Raków Częstochowa | Kraków |
| 15:00 CET | Piszczek 21'; van Amersfoort (yellow card) 36'; Loshaj (yellow card) 59'; Hanca (yellow card) 67'; Fiolić 90+7' | Report | Petrášek 11'; Tijanić 15'; Kun (yellow card) 57' | Stadium: Stadion Miejski im. Józefa Piłsudskiego; Attendance: 5,127; Referee: (Poland) Piotr Lasyk |

| 2 October 2020 6 | Śląsk Wrocław | 3 - 1 | Cracovia | Wrocław |
| 20:30 CET | Erik Expósito 17' 65'; Golla 22'; Štiglec (yellow card) 33' (yellow-red card) 81' | Report | Hanca (yellow card) 31' (goal) 50' (pen.); Álvarez (yellow card) 34'; Fiolić (yellow card) 53' | Stadium: Stadion Miejski; Attendance: 6,438; Referee: (Poland) Krzysztof Jakubik |

| 17 October 2020 7 | Cracovia | 1 - 0 | Piast Gliwice | Kraków |
| 15:00 CET | Râpă (yellow card) 19'; van Amersfoort 25' (pen.) (yellow card) 90+2'; Sadiković (yellow card) 35'; Zaucha (yellow card) 80'; Szymonowicz (yellow card) 90' | Report | Żyro (yellow card) 26'; Jodłowiec (yellow card) 64'; Lipski (yellow card) 86'; Świerczok (yellow card) 90+4' | Stadium: Stadion Miejski im. Józefa Piłsudskiego; Attendance: 0 Referee: (Poland) Paweł Raczkowski |
Note: COVID-19 pandemic in Poland

| 25 October 2020 8 | Lech Poznań | 1 - 1 | Cracovia | Poznań |
| 17:30 CET | Kravets (yellow card) 4'; Muhar (yellow card) 6'; Czerwiński (yellow card) 49'; Ishak (yellow card) 60'; Marchwiński (yellow card) 66'; Awaed 86'; Moder (yellow card) 90+4' | Report | van Amersfoort 30'; Szymonowicz (yellow card) 62'; Thiago (yellow card) 72'; Niemczycki (yellow card) 89'; Gardawski (yellow card) 90' | Stadium: INEA Stadion; Attendance: 0 Referee: (Poland) Krzysztof Jakubik |
Note: COVID-19 pandemic in Poland

=== Polish Super Cup ===
| 9 October 2020 | Legia Warsaw | 0–0 (4–5 p) | Cracovia | Warsaw |
| 20:15 CEST (UTC+02:00) | | Report | | Stadium: Polish Army Stadium; Attendance: 6,475; Referee: Wojciech Myć (Lublin) |
| | Penalties |
| | Antolić (penalty scored); Valencia (penalty scored); Cholewiak (penalty scored); Wszołek (penalty missed); Juranović (penalty scored) | | (penalty scored) van Amersfoort; (penalty scored) Sadiković; (penalty scored) Vestenický; (penalty scored) Fiolić; (penalty scored) Dimun |

=== Polish Cup ===
| 16 August 2020 Round of 64 | Chrobry Głogów | 1–2 (a.e.t.) | Cracovia | Głogów |
| 17:30 CEST (UTC+02:00) | Ilków-Gołąb 80' | Łączy nas piłka 90minut | Râpă 90'; Wdowiak 118' | Stadium: Stadion Chrobrego; Attendance: 642; Referee: Bartosz Frankowski (Toruń) |

| 14 November 2020 Round of 32 | Świt Skolwin | 0–1 | Cracovia | Szczecin |
| 12:30 CET (UTC+01:00) | | Łączy nas piłka 90minut | Pik 59' | Stadium: Stadion MOSRiR; Attendance: 0 Referee: Artur Aluszyk (Szczecin) |
Note: Match originally scheduled on 31 October 2020, 12:30 CET (UTC+01:00) was postponed due to COVID-19 disease detection in Świt Skolwin team.

| 9 February 2021 Round of 16 | Warta Poznań | 0–1 | Cracovia | Grodzisk Wielkopolski |
| 17:30 CET (UTC+01:00) | Jakóbowski (yellow card) 28'; Żurawski (yellow card) 47' | Report | Rivaldinho 12'; Pik (yellow card) 90' | Stadium: Stadion Miejski; Attendance: 0 Referee: (Poland) Zbigniew Dobrynin |
Note: Played Behind Closed Doors

| 3 March 2021 Quarter-finals | Chojniczanka Chojnice | 0–3 | Cracovia | Chojnice |
| 17:30 CET (UTC+01:00) | Mikołajczak (yellow card) 23' | Report | van Amersfoort 14' 57'; Pik 55'; Niemczycki (yellow card) 80' | Stadium: Chojniczanka 1930 City Stadium; Attendance: 0 Referee: (Poland) Łukasz Szczech |
Note: Played Behind Closed Doors

| 14 April 2021 Semi-finals | Cracovia | 1–2 | Raków Częstochowa | Kraków |
| 17:30 CET (UTC+01:00) | Rodin (yellow card) 37' (goal) 87'; Hanca (yellow card) 45'; Piszczek (yellow card) 47' (red card) 84'; Álvarez (yellow card) 79'; Loshaj (yellow card) 85' | Report | Arak 27' (yellow card) 85'; Sapała (yellow card) 35'; Tudor (yellow card) 51'; Niewulis (yellow card) 86'; Gutkovskis 89' | Stadium: Stadion Miejski im. Józefa Piłsudskiego; Attendance: 0 Referee: (Poland) Paweł Raczkowski |
Note: Played Behind Closed Doors

=== UEFA Europa League ===
==== First qualifying round ====
27 August 2020
19:00

| Malmö FF (Sweden) | 2–0 | (Poland) Cracovia |
|---|---|---|
| Berget 1'; Rieks 44' | Report |

Stadion, Malmö
Attendance: 0
Referee: Urs Schnyder (Switzerland)
