= 2022–23 MKS Cracovia season =

MKS Cracovia
2022–23 season
- Chairman: Janusz Filipiak
- Manager: Jacek Zieliński
- Stadium: Stadion Cracovii im. Józefa Piłsudskiego
- Ekstraklasa: 7th
- Polish Cup: Second round (eliminated by Resovia Rzeszów)

The 2022–23 season was MKS Cracovia's 117th season in existence and the club's tenth consecutive season in the top flight of Polish football. In addition to the domestic league, MKS Cracovia participated in the Polish Cup and were eliminated in the second round. The season covered the period from 1 July 2022 to 30 June 2023.

== Players ==
=== First-team squad ===
As of 26 November 2022

Note: Flags indicate national team as defined under FIFA eligibility rules; some limited exceptions apply. Players may hold more than one non-FIFA nationality.

No.	Pos.	Nation	Player
2	DF	ROU	Cornel Râpă
3	DF	SVK	Michal Sipľak
4	DF	POL	Paweł Jaroszyński (on loan from Salernitana)
5	DF	ROU	Virgil Ghiță
8	MF	DEN	Mathias Hebo
9	FW	FIN	Benjamin Källman
10	MF	UKR	Yevhen Konoplyanka
11	MF	POL	Michał Rakoczy
13	GK	POL	Sebastian Madejski
16	FW	POL	Przemysław Kapek
17	MF	POL	Kamil Ogorzały
18	MF	JPN	Takuto Oshima
20	MF	POL	Karol Knap
22	MF	KOS	Florian Loshaj
23	GK	POL	Karol Niemczycki

No.	Pos.	Nation	Player
24	DF	CZE	Jakub Jugas
25	DF	GEO	Otar Kakabadze
27	MF	POL	Marcin Budziński
31	GK	SVK	Lukáš Hroššo
33	DF	POL	Kamil Pestka (captain)
36	MF	POL	Kacper Jodłowski
38	MF	POL	Jakub Myszor
40	GK	POL	Filip Kramarz
55	DF	POL	Michał Stachera
66	DF	POL	Oskar Wójcik
71	FW	POL	Patryk Makuch
73	DF	POL	Patryk Zaucha
77	MF	POL	Sebastian Strózik
85	DF	CZE	David Jablonský

=== Out on loan ===
Note: Flags indicate national team as defined under FIFA eligibility rules; some limited exceptions apply. Players may hold more than one non-FIFA nationality.

No.	Pos.	Nation	Player
6	MF	POL	Sylwester Lusiusz (at Sandecja Nowy Sącz until 30 June 2023)
45	FW	SVK	Filip Balaj (at FC Trinity Zlín until 30 June 2023)

=== Players under contract ===
Note: Flags indicate national team as defined under FIFA eligibility rules; some limited exceptions apply. Players may hold more than one non-FIFA nationality.

No.	Pos.	Nation	Player
14	DF	POL	Krystian Bracik
—	MF	POL	Radosław Kanach

No.	Pos.	Nation	Player
—	FW	GER	Marcos Álvarez

== Pre-season and friendlies ==
Win Draw Loss Fixtures

9 January 2023 Friendly	Cracovia (Poland)	0–6	(Germany) Hansa Rostock	Belek, Turkey
14:30 TRT (UTC+3)				Stadium: Hotel RIU Kaya - Field D

14 January 2023 Friendly	Cracovia (Poland)	0–0	(Germany) 1. FC Nürnberg	Belek, Turkey
15:00 TRT (UTC+3)				Stadium: Titanic Sports Center - Field 2

16 January 2023 Friendly	Sigma Olomouc (Czech Republic)	1–2	(Poland) Cracovia	Turkey
17:30 TRT (UTC+3)

20 January 2023 Friendly	Cracovia (Poland)	v	(Czech Republic) Baník Ostrava	Turkey
13:00 TRT (UTC+3)

== Competitions ==
=== Ekstraklasa ===
==== League table ====
Pos	Team	Pld	W	D	L	GF	GA	GD	Pts
5	Piast Gliwice	34	15	8	11	40	31	+9	53
6	Górnik Zabrze	34	13	9	12	45	43	+2	48
7	Cracovia	34	12	10	12	41	35	+6	46
8	Warta Poznań	34	12	9	13	37	35	+2	45
9	Zagłębie Lubin	34	12	9	13	35	44	−9	45

Source: ekstraklasa.org
Rules for classification: 1) Points; 2) Head-to-head points; 3) Head-to-head goal difference; 4) Goal difference; 5) Goals scored; 6) Number of wins; 7) Number of away wins; 8) Lower number of points based on yellow and red cards (red card = 3 points, yellow card = 1 point, sending-off = 3 points - including 1 point for first yellow card); 9) Fairplay ranking; 10) Draw. (Note: Head-to-head record is used only after all the matches between the teams in question have been played)

==== Matches ====
The league fixtures were announced on 1 June 2022.

Ekstraklasa match details
Date	Time	Opponent	Venue	Result F–A
18 July 2022	19:00	Górnik Zabrze	A	2–0
23 July 2022	17:30	Korona Kielce	H	2–0
29 July 2022	20:30	Legia Warszawa	H	3–0
5 August 2022	18:00	FKS Stal Mielec	A	0–2
13 August 2022	15:00	Piast Gliwice	H	0–1
20 August 2022	17:30	Śląsk Wrocław	A	1–1
28 August 2022	12:30	Warta Poznań	H	0–2
3 September 2022	20:00	Raków Częstochowa	H	3–0
9 September 2022	20:30	Widzew Łódź	A	0–2
17 September 2022	20:00	Pogoń Szczecin	H	1–1
30 September 2022	18:00	Radomiak Radom	A	2–0
8 October 2022	20:00	Lechia Gdańsk	H	0–1
16 October 2022	12:30	Miedź Legnica	A	1–1
23 October 2022	17:30	Lech Poznań	H	0–0
30 October 2022	12:30	Zagłębie Lubin	A	2–0
5 November 2022	15:00	Jagiellonia Białystok	H	1–0
11 November 2022	20:30	Wisła Płock	A	0–1
30 January 2023	19:00	Górnik Zabrze	H	2–0
6 February 2023	19:00	Korona Kielce	A	1–2
12 February 2023	17:30	Legia Warszawa	A	2–2
17 February 2023	18:00	FKS Stal Mielec	H	2–1
25 February 2023	15:00	Piast Gliwice	A	1–2
5 March 2023	17:30	Śląsk Wrocław	H	1–1
12 March 2023	12:30	Warta Poznań	A	0–0
18 March 2023	20:00	Raków Częstochowa	A	1–4
2 April 2023	15:00	Widzew Łódź	H	1–1
8 April 2023	17:30	Pogoń Szczecin	A	2–3
15 April 2023	15:00	Radomiak Radom	H	3–0
22 April 2023	15:00	Lechia Gdańsk	A	2–1
1 May 2023	19:00	Miedź Legnica	H	1–1
6 May 2023	17:30	Lech Poznań	A	0–3
13 May 2023	17:30	Zagłębie Lubin	H	0–1
20 May 2023	15:00	Jagiellonia Białystok	A	1–1
27 May 2023	17:30	Wisła Płock	H	3–0

=== Polish Cup ===
Polish Cup match details
Round	Date	Time	Opponent	Venue	Result F–A	Scorers	Attendance	Ref.
First round	31 August 2022	16:30	LKS Lagów	A	3–1	Kakabadze 34', Ghiță 59', Konoplyanka 90+4'	350	
Second round	19 October 2022	17:30	Resovia Rzeszów	A	3–4	Sipľak 28', 37', Konoplyanka 45+1' pen.	3,016	
