= List of Polish football transfers winter 2023–24 =

This is a list of Polish football transfers for the 2023–24 winter transfer window. Only transfers featuring Ekstraklasa are listed.

== Ekstraklasa ==
Note: Flags indicate national team as has been defined under FIFA eligibility rules. Players may hold more than one non-FIFA nationality.

=== Raków Częstochowa ===
In:

No.	Pos.	Nation	Player
17	MF	POL	Jakub Myszor (from Cracovia)
22	MF	POL	Kacper Masiak (from Zagłębie Lubin)
23	MF	HUN	Péter Baráth (on loan from (Hungary) Ferencváros)
26	DF	KEN	Erick Otieno (from (Sweden) AIK)
31	GK	BIH	Muhamed Šahinović (from (Bosnia and Herzegovina) Sarajevo)
88	DF	CRO	Matej Rodin (from (Belgium) Oostende)

Out:

No.	Pos.	Nation	Player
12	GK	GRE	Antonis Tsiftsis (loan return to (Greece) Asteras Tripolis)
22	MF	ROU	Deian Sorescu (on loan to (Turkey) Gaziantep)
91	FW	POL	Tomasz Walczak (on loan to Pogoń Siedlce)
93	MF	GER	Sonny Kittel (on loan to (Australia) Western Sydney Wanderers)
99	FW	POL	Fabian Piasecki (to Piast Gliwice)

=== Legia Warsaw ===
In:

No.	Pos.	Nation	Player
11	MF	KOS	Qëndrim Zyba (on loan from (Kosovo) Ballkani)
25	DF	JPN	Ryoya Morishita (on loan from (Japan) Nagoya Grampus)

Out:

No.	Pos.	Nation	Player
11	MF	SVK	Robert Pich (to (Cyprus) Othellos Athienou)
14	MF	UKR	Ihor Kharatin (to (Slovakia) DAC Dunajská Streda)
18	MF	POL	Patryk Sokołowski (to Cracovia)
20	FW	ALB	Ernest Muçi (to (Turkey) Beşiktaş)
23	GK	POL	Gabriel Kobylak (on loan to Radomiak Radom)
31	GK	POL	Cezary Miszta (on loan to (Portugal) Rio Ave)
32	MF	GER	Makana Baku (on loan to (Greece) OFI Crete)
77	MF	POL	Jakub Jędrasik (to Bruk-Bet Termalica)
86	MF	POL	Igor Strzałek (on loan to Stal Mielec)
92	DF	MRI	Lindsay Rose (to (Greece) Aris)
99	MF	POL	Bartosz Slisz (to (United States) Atlanta United)

=== Lech Poznań ===
In:

No.	Pos.	Nation	Player

Out:

No.	Pos.	Nation	Player
54	MF	POL	Filip Wilak (on loan to Ruch Chorzów)
55	DF	POL	Maksymilian Pingot (on loan to Stal Mielec)
—	GK	POL	Krzysztof Bąkowski (on loan to Polonia Warsaw, previously on loan at Radomiak Radom)

=== Pogoń Szczecin ===
In:

No.	Pos.	Nation	Player

Out:

No.	Pos.	Nation	Player
1	GK	CRO	Dante Stipica (on loan to Ruch Chorzów)
17	MF	POL	Mariusz Fornalczyk (to Korona Kielce)
41	DF	POL	Paweł Stolarski (to Motor Lublin)
70	MF	POL	Stanisław Wawrzynowicz (on loan to Kotwica Kołobrzeg)
72	MF	IRN	Yadegar Rostami (on loan to ŁKS Łódź)

=== Piast Gliwice ===
In:

No.	Pos.	Nation	Player
9	FW	POL	Fabian Piasecki (from Raków Częstochowa)
81	MF	GEO	Valerian Gvilia (free agent)

Out:

No.	Pos.	Nation	Player
27	FW	POL	Gabriel Kirejczyk (on loan to Zagłębie Sosnowiec)
29	FW	POL	Marcel Bykowski (on loan to Kotwica Kołobrzeg)
98	DF	GRE	Alexandros Katranis (to (United States) Real Salt Lake)

=== Górnik Zabrze ===
In:

No.	Pos.	Nation	Player
41	MF	JPN	Sōichirō Kōzuki (on loan from (Germany) Schalke 04)

Out:

No.	Pos.	Nation	Player
14	DF	POL	Jakub Pochcioł (on loan to Polonia Bytom)
18	MF	JPN	Daisuke Yokota (to (Belgium) Gent)
20	FW	POL	Mateusz Chmarek (on loan to GKS Jastrzębie)
96	MF	POL	Robert Dadok (to Ruch Chorzów)
—	DF	POL	Krzysztof Wingralek (to PRO Warszawa, previously on loan at Górnik Polkowice)

=== Cracovia ===
In:

No.	Pos.	Nation	Player
11	MF	DEN	Mikkel Maigaard (from (Norway) Sarpsborg 08)
19	DF	ISL	Davíð Kristján Ólafsson (from (Sweden) Kalmar)
33	DF	ALB	Eneo Bitri (on loan from (Norway) Vålerenga)
88	MF	POL	Patryk Sokołowski (from Legia Warsaw)

Out:

No.	Pos.	Nation	Player
14	MF	POL	Sylwester Lusiusz (to Podbeskidzie)
19	FW	POL	Kamil Ogorzały (on loan to Podhale Nowy Targ)
36	MF	POL	Kacper Jodłowski (to Siarka Tarnobrzeg)
38	MF	POL	Jakub Myszor (to Raków Częstochowa)
55	DF	POL	Michał Stachera (to Wiślanie Jaśkowice)
61	MF	POL	Robert Ożóg (to Wiślanie Jaśkowice)
66	DF	POL	Oskar Wójcik (on loan to GKS Bełchatów)
73	DF	POL	Patryk Zaucha (to Stal Stalowa Wola)
87	DF	POL	Oliwier Hyla (on loan to Unia Tarnów)
97	MF	BRA	Thiago (to Puszcza Niepołomice)

=== Warta Poznań ===
In:

No.	Pos.	Nation	Player
20	DF	ALG	Mohamed Mezghrani (from (Hungary) Puskás Akadémia)

Out:

No.	Pos.	Nation	Player
20	DF	POL	Jakub Wajman (on loan to Sokół Kleczew)
26	MF	POL	Igor Stańczak (on loan to Warta Gorzów)
34	DF	POL	Wiktor Pleśnierowicz (on loan to Polonia Warsaw)
97	FW	POL	Wiktor Kamiński (on loan to Sandecja Nowy Sącz)
—	GK	POL	Mateusz Kustosz (on loan to Carina Gubin, previously on loan at Unia Swarzędz)
—	MF	POL	Mikołaj Rakowski (on loan to Unia Solec Kujawski, previously on loan at Kotwica Kołobrzeg)

=== Zagłębie Lubin ===
In:

No.	Pos.	Nation	Player

Out:

No.	Pos.	Nation	Player
3	DF	DEN	Mikkel Kirkeskov (to (Germany) Holstein Kiel)
9	MF	GEO	Tornike Gaprindashvili (on loan to Arka Gdynia)
33	DF	POL	Jarosław Jach (on loan to Wisła Płock)
74	DF	POL	Kamil Kruk (to Motor Lublin)
80	MF	POL	Kacper Masiak (to Raków Częstochowa)

=== Radomiak Radom ===
In:

No.	Pos.	Nation	Player
4	DF	CRO	Luka Vušković (on loan from (Croatia) Hajduk Split)
22	FW	GNB	Jardel (on loan from (Portugal) Vizela)
23	MF	BRA	João Peglow (from (Brazil) Internacional, previously on loan at (Brazil) Sport Recife)
28	GK	POL	Gabriel Kobylak (on loan from Legia Warsaw)
66	MF	POR	Bruno Jordão (from (England) Wolverhampton Wanderers)
70	FW	CPV	Vagner (free agent)
99	MF	BRA	Guilherme Zimovski (from (Brazil) Capivariano)

Out:

No.	Pos.	Nation	Player
3	DF	GNB	Pedro Justiniano (to (Finland) VPS, previously on loan at (Romania) Petrolul Ploiești)
5	DF	POR	Hélder Sá (loan return to (Portugal) Vitória Guimarães)
12	GK	POL	Albert Posiadała (to (Norway) Molde)
31	GK	POL	Krzysztof Bąkowski (loan return to Lech Poznań)
70	MF	COL	Frank Castañeda (to (Colombia) Independiente Santa Fe)
96	FW	BRA	Pedro Henrique (to (China) Wuhan Three Towns)
99	FW	POR	Edi Semedo (to (Cyprus) Aris Limassol)
—	FW	POL	Dominik Sokół (to Zagłębie Sosnowiec, previously on loan at (Slovakia) Tatran Prešov)

=== Stal Mielec ===
In:

No.	Pos.	Nation	Player
31	MF	ROU	Ion Gheorghe (on loan from (Romania) Sepsi OSK)
34	MF	POL	Alex Cetnar (from (Italy) Cagliari U17)
55	DF	POL	Maksymilian Pingot (on loan from Lech Poznań)
86	MF	POL	Igor Strzałek (on loan from Legia Warsaw)

Out:

No.	Pos.	Nation	Player
14	MF	POL	Przemysław Maj (on loan to Czarni Połaniec)
19	MF	POL	Michał Trąbka (to Wieczysta Kraków)
—	MF	POL	Krystian Kardyś (on loan to Czarni Połaniec, previously on loan at Olimpia Elbląg)
—	MF	POL	David Poreba (on loan to (United States) Chicago Fire II, previously on loan at (United States) Crown Legacy)

=== Widzew Łódź ===
In:

No.	Pos.	Nation	Player
1	GK	POL	Rafał Gikiewicz (from (Turkey) Ankaragücü)
35	GK	SVK	Ivan Krajčírik (from (Slovakia) Ružomberok)
44	MF	FRA	Noah Diliberto (from (France) Lens)
62	DF	KOS	Lirim Kastrati (from (Hungary) Újpest)

Out:

No.	Pos.	Nation	Player
1	GK	SVK	Henrich Ravas (to (United States) New England Revolution)
95	DF	POL	Patryk Stępiński (to Ruch Chorzów)

=== Korona Kielce ===
In:

No.	Pos.	Nation	Player
10	MF	FIN	Petteri Forsell (free agent)
21	MF	MEX	Danny Trejo (from (United States) Phoenix Rising)
23	DF	POL	Marcel Pięczek (from Puszcza Niepołomice)
71	MF	POL	Mariusz Fornalczyk (from Pogoń Szczecin)

Out:

No.	Pos.	Nation	Player
10	MF	ROU	Ronaldo Deaconu (to (Romania) Farul Constanța)

=== Jagiellonia Białystok ===
In:

No.	Pos.	Nation	Player
4	DF	KOS	Jetmir Haliti (from (Sweden) AIK)
9	FW	GER	Kaan Caliskaner (on loan from (Germany) Eintracht Braunschweig)

Out:

No.	Pos.	Nation	Player
32	DF	POL	Miłosz Matysik (to (Cyprus) Aris Limassol)

=== Śląsk Wrocław ===
In:

No.	Pos.	Nation	Player
11	FW	POL	Patryk Klimala (from (Israel) Hapoel Be'er Sheva)
20	MF	BIH	Alen Mustafić (on loan from (Denmark) OB)
32	DF	POL	Mikołaj Tudruj (from Lech Poznań II)
78	DF	POL	Tommaso Guercio (from (Italy) Inter Milan)
87	DF	BUL	Simeon Petrov (on loan from (Bulgaria) CSKA 1948)
90	FW	VEN	Lewuis Peña (from (Venezuela) Rayo Zuliano)

Out:

No.	Pos.	Nation	Player
3	DF	ENG	Cameron Borthwick-Jackson (on loan to (Scotland) Ross County)
6	DF	POL	Szymon Lewkot (on loan to Chrobry Głogów)
7	FW	DEN	Kenneth Zohore (free agent)
18	MF	POL	Karol Borys (to (Belgium) Westerlo)
25	MF	POL	Marcel Zylla (free agent)
—	DF	POL	Kacper Radkowski (to (Republic of Ireland) Waterford, previously on loan at (Republic of Ireland) Bohemians)
—	MF	POL	Filip Gryglak (to Wisła Płock II)

=== ŁKS Łódź ===
In:

No.	Pos.	Nation	Player
4	DF	AZE	Rahil Mammadov (from (Azerbaijan) Qarabağ)
6	MF	ARG	Thiago Ceijas (from (Bulgaria) Beroe)
18	DF	DEN	Riza Durmisi (free agent)
29	MF	IRN	Yadegar Rostami (on loan from Pogoń Szczecin)
70	FW	AUT	Husein Balić (from (Austria) LASK)

Out:

No.	Pos.	Nation	Player
4	DF	ESP	Nacho Monsalve (to (Spain) Eldense)
6	FW	COD	Nelson Balongo (to (Belgium) Seraing)
7	MF	POL	Adrian Małachowski (on loan to Podbeskidzie)
17	FW	POL	Grzegorz Glapka (on loan to Olimpia Grudziądz)
28	DF	POL	Mieszko Lorenc (to Wisła Płock)
29	FW	NED	Anton Fase (free agent)

=== Ruch Chorzów ===
In:

No.	Pos.	Nation	Player
6	DF	ESP	Josema (from (Spain) Leganés)
33	FW	POL	Mike Huras (from (Germany) Stuttgart U19)
36	GK	CRO	Dante Stipica (on loan from Pogoń Szczecin)
54	MF	POL	Filip Wilak (on loan from Lech Poznań)
59	DF	POL	Patryk Stępiński (from Widzew Łódź)
86	FW	HUN	Soma Novothny (from (Hungary) Vasas)
88	MF	CZE	Adam Vlkanova (on loan from (Czech Republic) Viktoria Plzeň)
96	MF	POL	Robert Dadok (from Górnik Zabrze)

Out:

No.	Pos.	Nation	Player
2	DF	POL	Konrad Kasolik (to Wieczysta Kraków)
6	MF	POL	Tomasz Swędrowski (to Wieczysta Kraków)
9	FW	POL	Maciej Firlej (to Puszcza Niepołomice)
18	FW	POL	Dominik Steczyk (to (Germany) Preußen Münster)
25	DF	POL	Paweł Baranowski (to GKS Jastrzębie)
31	GK	POL	Krzysztof Kamiński (loan return to Wisła Płock)
88	MF	POL	Kacper Skwierczyński (on loan to (Republic of Ireland) Waterford)

=== Puszcza Niepołomice ===
In:

No.	Pos.	Nation	Player
6	MF	KOR	Lee Jin-hyun (from (South Korea) Daejeon Hana Citizen)
7	MF	BRA	Thiago (from Cracovia)
67	DF	MDA	Ioan-Călin Revenco (from (Moldova) Petrocub Hîncești)
96	FW	POL	Maciej Firlej (from Ruch Chorzów)

Out:

No.	Pos.	Nation	Player
6	DF	POL	Marcel Pięczek (to Korona Kielce)
24	FW	BIH	Muris Mešanović (on loan to (Czech Republic) Dukla Prague)
30	FW	POL	Adam Kramarz (on loan to Ostrowiec Świętokrzyski)
44	MF	POL	Kacper Cichoń (on loan to Olimpia Grudziądz)
99	GK	POL	Kacper Piechota (on loan to Wiązownica)

== See also ==
- 2023–24 Ekstraklasa
