= Soska =

Soska or Šoška is a surname. Notable people with the surname include:

- Jen and Sylvia Soska (born 1983), Canadian twin film directors
- Ľuboš Šoška (born 1977), Slovak slalom canoeist
- Mariusz Soska (born 1983), Polish footballer
- Miroslav Šoška, Slovak figure skater
- Peter Šoška (born 1976), Slovak slalom canoeist
