= Michał Rakoczy =

Polish footballer

Personal information
- Full name: Michał Miłosz Rakoczy
- Date of birth: 30 March 2002 (age 24)
- Place of birth: Jasło, Poland
- Height: 1.77 m (5 ft 10 in)
- Position: Midfielder

Team information
- Current team: Podbeskidzie (on loan from Górnik Zabrze)
- Number: 6

Youth career
- UKS 6 Jasło
- 2015–2018: Cracovia

Senior career*
Years	Team	Apps	(Gls)
2018–2026	Cracovia	108	(17)
2020–2021	→ Puszcza Niepołomice (loan)	28	(0)
2025	→ Ankaragücü (loan)	14	(1)
2026–	Górnik Zabrze	5	(1)
2026–	→ Podbeskidzie (loan)	0	(0)

International career
2017–2018	Poland U16	11	(4)
2018–2019	Poland U17	11	(4)
2020	Poland U19	2	(0)
2019–2022	Poland U20	3	(0)
2022–2025	Poland U21	19	(3)
- * Club domestic league appearances and goals as of 19:20, 29 May 2026 (UTC)

Michał Miłosz Rakoczy (born 30 March 2002) is a Polish professional footballer who plays as a midfielder for I liga club Podbeskidzie Bielsko-Biała, on loan from Górnik Zabrze.

== Club career ==
On 25 September 2020, he joined Puszcza Niepołomice on a season-long loan.

On 18 January 2025, Rakoczy moved to Turkish club Ankaragücü on a six-month loan with an option to buy.

On 8 January 2026, Rakoczy left Cracovia for fellow Ekstraklasa club Górnik Zabrze, signing a deal until June 2028 with an option for another year. On 9 September 2026, he moved on loan to I liga club Podbeskidzie Bielsko-Biała for the rest of the season.

== Career statistics ==
As of match played 9 May 2026

Appearances and goals by club, season and competition
Club	Season	League			National cup (Note: Includes Polish Cup, Turkish Cup)		Europe		Other		Total	
Club	Season	Division	Apps	Goals	Apps	Goals	Apps	Goals	Apps	Goals	Apps	Goals
Cracovia	2017–18	Ekstraklasa	1	0	0	0	—		—		1	0
Cracovia	2018–19	Ekstraklasa	0	0	0	0	—		—		0	0
Cracovia	2019–20	Ekstraklasa	9	1	2	0	—		—		11	1
Cracovia	2020–21	Ekstraklasa	0	0	1	0	—		—		1	0
Cracovia	2021–22	Ekstraklasa	24	3	1	0	—		—		25	3
Cracovia	2022–23	Ekstraklasa	30	7	2	0	—		—		32	7
Cracovia	2023–24	Ekstraklasa	32	6	0	0	—		—		32	6
Cracovia	2024–25	Ekstraklasa	9	0	0	0	—		—		9	0
Cracovia	2025–26	Ekstraklasa	3	0	1	0	—		—		4	0
Cracovia	Total		108	17	7	0	0	0	0	0	115	17
Puszcza Niepołomice (loan)	2020–21	I liga	28	0	2	0	—		—		30	0
Ankaragücü (loan)	2024–25	TFF 1. Lig	14	1	2	0	—		—		16	1
Górnik Zabrze	2025–26	Ekstraklasa	5	1	0	0	—		—		5	1
Górnik Zabrze	2026–27	Ekstraklasa	0	0	0	0	0	0	0	0	0	0
Górnik Zabrze	Total		5	1	0	0	0	0	0	0	5	1
Podbeskidzie (loan)	2026–27	I liga	0	0	—		—		—		0	0
Career total			155	19	11	0	0	0	0	0	166	19

== Honours ==
Cracovia

- Polish Cup: 2019–20

Cracovia II

- IV liga Lesser Poland West: 2019–20

Individual

- Ekstraklasa Young Player of the Month: February 2022, July 2022
