= Dawid Szymonowicz =

Polish footballer (born 1995)

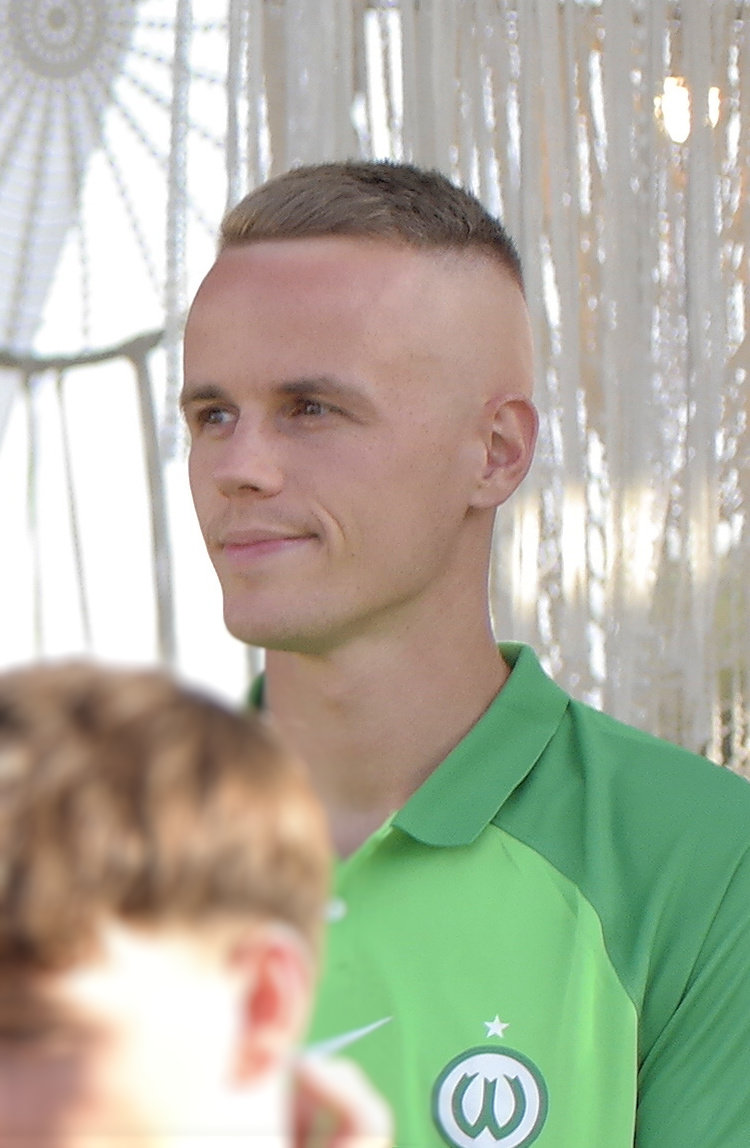
- Szymonowicz with Warta Poznań in 2023

Personal information
- Full name: Dawid Szymonowicz
- Date of birth: 7 July 1995 (age 31)
- Place of birth: Lidzbark Warmiński, Poland
- Height: 1.84 m (6 ft 0 in)
- Positions: Defender; defensive midfielder

Team information
- Current team: Wieczysta Kraków
- Number: 44

Youth career
- Polonia Lidzbark Warmiński
- DKS Dobre Miasto
- 2009–2011: Stomil Olsztyn

Senior career*
Years	Team	Apps	(Gls)
2012–2015	Stomil Olsztyn	54	(4)
2015–2021	Jagiellonia Białystok	22	(1)
2016–2017	Jagiellonia Białystok II	6	(0)
2017	→ Zlaté Moravce (loan)	12	(0)
2018–2019	→ Bruk-Bet Termalica (loan)	22	(1)
2019	→ Raków Częstochowa (loan)	13	(0)
2020–2021	→ Cracovia (loan)	24	(1)
2021–2024	Warta Poznań	84	(4)
2024–2025	Puszcza Niepołomice	23	(2)
2025–	Wieczysta Kraków	14	(1)
2026–	Wieczysta Kraków II	7	(2)

International career
2015	Poland U20	4	(0)
- * Club domestic league appearances and goals as of 21:19, 31 May 2026 (UTC)

Dawid Szymonowicz (born 7 July 1995) is a Polish professional footballer who plays for Ekstraklasa club Wieczysta Kraków.

== Career statistics ==
As of match played 31 May 2026

Appearances and goals by club, season and competition
Club	Season	League			National cup (Note: Includes Polish Cup)		Other		Total	
Club	Season	Division	Apps	Goals	Apps	Goals	Apps	Goals	Apps	Goals
Stomil Olsztyn	2012–13	I liga	1	0	0	0	—		1	0
Stomil Olsztyn	2013–14	I liga	11	0	1	0	—		12	0
Stomil Olsztyn	2014–15	I liga	25	2	0	0	—		25	2
Stomil Olsztyn	2015–16	I liga	17	2	2	0	—		19	2
Stomil Olsztyn	Total		54	4	3	0	0	0	57	4
Jagiellonia Białystok	2015–16	Ekstraklasa	8	1	0	0	—		8	1
Jagiellonia Białystok	2016–17	Ekstraklasa	6	0	1	0	—		7	0
Jagiellonia Białystok	2017–18	Ekstraklasa	1	0	1	0	—		2	0
Jagiellonia Białystok	2019–20	Ekstraklasa	7	0	0	0	—		7	0
Jagiellonia Białystok	Total		22	1	2	0	0	0	24	1
Jagiellonia Białystok II	2016–17	III liga, group I	6	0	—		—		6	0
ViOn Zlaté Moravce (loan)	2017–18	Slovak Super Liga	12	0	0	0	—		12	0
Bruk-Bet Termalica Nieciecza (loan)	2018–19	I liga	22	1	2	0	—		24	1
Raków Częstochowa (loan)	2019–20	Ekstraklasa	13	0	1	0	—		14	0
Cracovia (loan)	2020–21	Ekstraklasa	24	1	4	0	1 (Note: Appearance in Polish Super Cup)	0	29	1
Warta Poznań	2021–22	Ekstraklasa	20	2	0	0	—		20	2
Warta Poznań	2022–23	Ekstraklasa	33	1	1	0	—		34	1
Warta Poznań	2023–24	Ekstraklasa	31	1	1	0	—		32	1
Warta Poznań	Total		84	4	2	0	0	0	86	4
Puszcza Niepołomice	2024–25	Ekstraklasa	23	2	1	1	—		24	3
Wieczysta Kraków	2025–26	I liga	12	1	1	0	2 (Note: Appearances in I liga promotion play-offs)	0	15	1
Wieczysta Kraków II	2025–26	IV liga Lesser Poland	7	2	—		—		7	2
Career total			279	16	13	1	3	0	295	17

== Honours ==
Cracovia

- Polish Super Cup: 2020

Wieczysta Kraków II

- IV liga Lesser Poland: 2025–26
