= Mariusz Soska =

Polish footballer

Personal information
- Full name: Mariusz Adam Soska
- Date of birth: 11 June 1983 (age 43)
- Place of birth: Pułtusk, Poland
- Height: 1.80 m (5 ft 11 in)
- Position: Defender

Youth career
- Nadnarwianka Pułtusk
- Polonia Warsaw

Senior career*
Years	Team	Apps	(Gls)
–2002	Polonia Warsaw II		
2003	MKS Przasnysz		
2003	Nadnarwianka Pułtusk		
2004	Kujawiak Włocławek		
2004–2005	Warmia Grajewo		
2005	Jeziorak Iława		
2006	Nadnarwianka Pułtusk		
2007	Drava Ptuj	24	(0)
2008–2009	Nadnarwianka Pułtusk	33	(1)
2009	GLKS Nadarzyn	10	(0)
2010	Krško	9	(1)
- * Club domestic league appearances and goals

Mariusz Adam Soska (born 11 June 1983) is a Polish former professional footballer who played as a defender.

== Career ==
Before the second half of the 2006–07 season, Soska signed for Slovenian top flight side Drava Ptuj, where he did not receive payment for six months.

In early 2008, he signed for Nadnarwianka Pułtusk in the Polish fourth division.

Before the second half of the 2009–10 season, he signed for Slovenian second division club Krško.
