= 2018–19 SC Heerenveen season =

Season of a Dutch football club

SC Heerenveen
2018–19 season
- Chairman: Cees Roozemond
- Algemeen directeur: Jan Olde Riekerink
- Stadium: Abe Lenstra Stadion
- Eredivisie: 11th
- KNVB Cup: Quarter-finals
- Top goalscorer: Michel Vlap (16); Sam Lammers (16)
- Biggest win: De Graafschap 0 - 5 SC Heerenveen
- Biggest defeat: SC Heerenveen 0 - 4 AFC Ajax
Home colours	Away colours	Third colours

The 2018–19 season was SC Heerenveen's 54th season in existence and the club's 26th consecutive season in the top flight of Dutch football. In addition to the domestic league, SC Heerenveen participated in this season's edition of the KNVB Cup.

== Players ==
=== First-team squad ===
As of 13 March 2023

Note: Flags indicate national team as defined under FIFA eligibility rules; some limited exceptions apply. Players may hold more than one non-FIFA nationality.

No.	Pos.	Nation	Player
1	GK	NED	Warner Hahn
2	DF	NED	Sherel Floranus
3	DF	DEN	Daniel Høegh
4	DF	DEN	Andreas Skovgaard
5	DF	NED	Kik Pierie
6	DF	NED	Stijn Schaars
7	FW	SRB	Nemanja Mihajlović
8	MF	NOR	Morten Thorsby
10	MF	NED	Ben Rienstra
11	FW	NED	Mitchell van Bergen
12	DF	NED	Doke Schmidt
14	DF	KOS	Ibrahim Drešević
15	MF	NED	Rodney Kongolo
16	DF	NED	Lucas Woudenberg
18	DF	NED	Michel Vlap
19	MF	NED	Pelle van Amersfoort

No.	Pos.	Nation	Player
21	MF	JPN	Yuki Kobayashi
22	MF	DEN	Emil Frederiksen
23	GK	POL	Filip Bednarek
24	GK	NED	Trevor Doornbusch
31	GK	NED	Jan Bekkema
35	MF	NED	Jizz Hornkamp
—	MF	KOS	Arbër Zeneli
—	FW	NED	Arjen van der Heide
—	DF	NED	Dave Bulthuis
—	FW	NOR	Dennis Johnsen
—	GK	NED	Jan de Boer
—	MF	NED	Jordy Bruijn
—	FW	NZL	Marco Rojas
—	DF	NOR	Nicolai Næss
—	DF	NED	Sam Lammers
—	DF	SLO	Vanja Drkušić

== Scorers ==
#	Player	Eredivisie	KNVB Cup	Total
1	(Netherlands) Sam Lammers	16	3	19
2	(Netherlands) Michel Vlap	16	1	17
3	(Netherlands) Mitchell van Bergen	7	-	7
4	(Netherlands) Pelle van Amersfoort	4	2	6
5	(Norway) Morten Thorsby	5	-	5
5	(Netherlands) Ben Rienstra	4	1	5
7	(Kosovo) Arbër Zeneli	3	1	4
8	(Denmark) Daniel Høegh	2	-	2
8	(Netherlands) Dave Bulthuis	2	-	2
8	(Netherlands) Jizz Hornkamp	2	-	2
8	(Netherlands) Kik Pierie	2	-	2
12	(Serbia) Nemanja Mihajlović	1	-	1

== Eredivisie ==
=== League table ===
Pos	Team	Pld	W	D	L	GF	GA	GD	Pts
9	ADO Den Haag	34	12	9	13	58	63	−5	45
10	Willem II	34	13	5	16	58	72	−14	44
11	Heerenveen	34	10	11	13	64	73	−9	41
12	VVV-Venlo	34	11	8	15	47	63	−16	41
13	PEC Zwolle	34	11	6	17	44	57	−13	39

Source: eredivisie.nl
Rules for classification: Season in progress: 1) Most points won; 2) Less points lost; 3) Goal difference; 4) Goals scored; 5) Alphabetical order; End of season: 1) Points; 2) Goal difference; 3) Goals scored; 4) Head-to-head points; 5) Head-to-head goal difference; 6) Head-to-head away goals scored; 7) Play-off if relevant for deciding champion, relegation or participating in a European league, otherwise by draw. 8) Penalty shoot-out (only after a play-off)

Ten teams, two from the Eredivisie and eight from the Eerste Divisie, played for two spots in the 2019–20 Eredivisie, the remaining eight teams playing in the 2019–20 Eerste Divisie.

First round
NEC	2	0	2
RKC Waalwijk	0	3	3
SC Cambuur	2	2	4
Almere City	2	1	3

Second round
RKC Waalwijk	2	1	3
Excelsior	1	1	2
Go Ahead Eagles	2	1	3
FC Den Bosch	2	0	2
TOP Oss	0	0	0
Sparta Rotterdam	2	3	5
SC Cambuur	1	0	1
De Graafschap	1	2	3

Third round
RKC Waalwijk*	0	5	5
Go Ahead Eagles	0	4	4
Sparta Rotterdam*	1	2	3
De Graafschap	2	0	2

Key: * = Play-off winners, (a) = Wins because of away goals rule, (e) = Wins after extra time in second leg, (p) = Wins after penalty shoot-out.

=== Eredivisie games ===
==== 1st half ====
10 August 2018 1st week	PEC Zwolle	2–3	SC Heerenveen	Zwolle
20:00	Mike van Duinen 28', 56'	Report	Morten Thorsby 32' 39'; Arbër Zeneli 43'	Stadium: MAC³PARK Stadion; Attendance: 14,000

19 August 2018 2nd week	SC Heerenveen	1–1	SBV Vitesse	Heerenveen
16:45	Michel Vlap 26'	Report	Tim Matavž 81'	Stadium: Abe Lenstra Stadion; Attendance: 16,080

26 August 2018 3rd week	SC Heerenveen	3–5	Feyenoord	Heerenveen
14:30	Morten Thorsby 71'; Kik Pierie 85'; Dave Bulthuis 89'	Report	Jens Toornstra 4' 45+1'; Robin van Persie 15'; Tyrell Malacia 47'; Yassin Ayoub 90+1'	Stadium: Abe Lenstra Stadion; Attendance: 21,700

1 September 2018 4th week	VVV-Venlo	1–1	SC Heerenveen	Venlo
18:30	Patrick Joosten 69'	Report	Sam Lammers 32'	Stadium: Covebo Stadion - De Koel - Attendance: 6,235

16 September 2018 5th week	SC Heerenveen	3–5	Heracles Almelo	Heerenveen
14:30	Sam Lammers 45+1' 53'; Morten Thorsby 67'	Report	Adrian Dalmau 12'; Lerin Duarte 48'; Kristoffer Peterson 63' 72'; Mohammed Osman 87'	Stadium: Abe Lenstra Stadion; Attendance: 15,500

22 September 2018 6th week	Excelsior Rotterdam	3–3	SC Heerenveen	Rotterdam
19:45	Ali Messaoud 12' 51'; Luigi Bruins 42'	Report	Dave Bulthuis 49'; Morten Thorsby 59'; Jizz Hornkamp 90+2'	Stadium: Van Donge & De Roo Stadion; Attendance: 4,008

29 September 2018 7th week	SC Heerenveen	1–1	ADO Den Haag	Heerenveen
18:30	Michel Vlap 31'	Report	Tomáš Necid 45'	Stadium: Abe Lenstra Stadion; Attendance: 16,550

6 October 2018 8th week	De Graafschap	0–5	SC Heerenveen	Doetinchem
20:45		Report	Sam Lammers 25', 28'; Michel Vlap 36' 40'; Jizz Hornkamp 88'	Stadium: De Vijverberg; Attendance: 12,102

20 October 2018 9th week	SC Heerenveen	0–4	AFC Ajax	Heerenveen
20:45		Report	Lasse Schöne 3'; Hakim Ziyech 42'; Dušan Tadić 52'; Kasper Dolberg 56'	Stadium: Abe Lenstra Stadion; Attendance: 23,315

28 October 2018 10th week	AZ Alkmaar	2–3	SC Heerenveen	Alkmaar
16:45	Thomas Ouwejan 16'; Albert Guðmundsson 79'	Report	Michel Vlap 30' 46'; Sam Lammers 84'	Stadium: AFAS Stadion; Attendance: 16,535

4 November 2018 11th week	SC Heerenveen	1–1	FC Emmen	Heerenveen
12:15	Arbër Zeneli 30'	Report	Reuven Niemeijer 88'	Stadium: Abe Lenstra Stadion; Attendance: 19,835

11 November 2018 12th week	FC Groningen	2–0	SC Heerenveen	Groningen
12:15	Django Warmerdam 27'; Ritsu Dōan 38'	Report		Stadium: Hitachi Capital Mobility Stadion; Attendance: 20,731

24 November 2018 13th week	PSV Eindhoven	3–0	SC Heerenveen	Eindhoven
20:45	Hirving Lozano 11' 66'; Luuk de Jong 52'	Report		Stadium: Philips Stadion; Attendance: 34,100

1 December 2018 14th week	SC Heerenveen	3–1	Fortuna Sittard	Heerenveen
20:45	Daniel Høegh 43'; Arbër Zeneli 47'; Pelle van Amersfoort 79'	Report	Lazaros Lamprou 48'	Stadium: Abe Lenstra Stadion; Attendance: 15,626

8 December 2018 15th week	Willem II	1–5	SC Heerenveen	Tilburg
18:30	Atakan Akkaynak 17'	Report	Nemanja Mihajlović 15'; Ben Rienstra 41'; Michel Vlap 53'; Mitchell van Bergen 58' 65'	Stadium: Koning Willem II Stadion; Attendance: 12,595

16 December 2018 16th week	SC Heerenveen	2–3	FC Utrecht	Heerenveen
12:15	Michel Vlap 69'; Pelle van Amersfoort 75'	Report	Emil Bergström 14'; Gyrano Kerk 26'; Oussama Tannane 45+2'	Stadium: Abe Lenstra Stadion; Attendance: 17,575

22 December 2018 17th week	NAC Breda	4–2	SC Heerenveen	Breda
19:45	Mitchell te Vrede 6' 58'; Mikhail Rosheuvel 69' 76'	Report	Ben Rienstra 11'; Mitchell van Bergen 27'	Stadium: Rat Verlegh Stadion; Attendance: 18,352

===== 2nd half =====
20 January 2019 18th week	AFC Ajax	4–4	SC Heerenveen	Amsterdam
16:45	Dušan Tadić 13' 16'; Pelle van Amersfoort 28' (o.g.); Klaas-Jan Huntelaar 83'	Report	Sam Lammers 14' 51'; Mitchell van Bergen 56'; Kik Pierie 90+1'	Stadium: Johan Cruyff Arena; Attendance: 52,553

27 January 2019 19th week	SC Heerenveen	0–2	AZ Alkmaar	Heerenveen
16:45		Report	Sherel Floranus 64' (o.g.); Oussama Idrissi 78'	Stadium: Abe Lenstra Stadion; Attendance: 17,182

2 February 2019 20th week	SBV Vitesse	2–2	SC Heerenveen	Arnhem
18:30	Mukhtar Ali 24'; Bryan Linssen 58'	Report	Michel Vlap 14'; Sam Lammers 90+3'	Stadium: GelreDome; Attendance: 15,342

9 February 2019 21st week	SC Heerenveen	1–1	PEC Zwolle	Heerenveen
18:30	Michel Vlap 30'	Report	Thomas Lam 45+1'	Stadium: Abe Lenstra Stadion; Attendance: 19,822

16 February 2019 22nd week	SC Heerenveen	2–2	PSV Eindhoven	Heerenveen
19:45	Mitchell van Bergen 3'; Michel Vlap 25'	Report	Gastón Pereiro 59'; Donyell Malen 90+5'	Stadium: Abe Lenstra Stadion; Attendance: 23,522

23 February 2019 23rd week	Fortuna Sittard	2–4	SC Heerenveen	Sittard
19:45	Lazaros Lamprou 7'; Mark Diemers 31'	Report	Daniel Høegh 45+1'; Mitchell van Bergen 61'; Sam Lammers 74' 84'	Stadium: Fortuna Sittard Stadion; Attendance: 8,523

3 March 2019 24th week	SC Heerenveen	4–2	Willem II	Heerenveen
14:30	Michel Vlap 4'; Sam Lammers 10' 33'; Ben Rienstra 90+4'	Report	Alexander Isak 54'; Vangelis Pavlidis 62'	Stadium: Abe Lenstra Stadion; Attendance: 17,882

9 March 2019 25th week	ADO Den Haag	2–3	SC Heerenveen	The Hague
19:45	Tomáš Necid 63'; Abdenasser El Khayati 90+4'	Report	Michel Vlap 21' 67'; Sam Lammers 90+2'	Stadium: ADO Den Haag Stadium; Attendance: 13,118

16 March 2019 26th week	SC Heerenveen	0–3	De Graafschap	Heerenveen
18:30		Report	Charlison Benschop 3'; Javier Vet 68'; Delano Burgzorg 70'	Stadium: Abe Lenstra Stadion; Attendance: 19,020

30 March 2019 27th week	SC Heerenveen	1–0	Excelsior Rotterdam	Heerenveen
20:45	Pelle van Amersfoort 90'	Report		Stadium: Abe Lenstra Stadion; Attendance: 18,021

4 April 2019 28th week	Feyenoord	3–0	SC Heerenveen	Rotterdam
20:45	Nicolai Jørgensen 32'; Steven Berghuis 53'; Tonny Vilhena 71'	Report		Stadium: De Kuip; Attendance: 25,000

7 April 2019 29th week	FC Emmen	2–0	SC Heerenveen	Emmen
12:15	Caner Cavlan 40' 75'	Report		Stadium: De Oude Meerdijk; Attendance: 8,268

14 April 2019 30th week	SC Heerenveen	1–1	FC Groningen	Heerenveen
14:30	Pelle van Amersfoort 38'	Report	Paul Gladon 61'	Stadium: Abe Lenstra Stadion; Attendance: 21,056

19 April 2019 31st week	Heracles Almelo	2–1	SC Heerenveen	Almelo
20:00	Brandley Kuwas 27'; Adrian Dalmau 73'	Report	Sam Lammers 41'	Stadium: Polman Stadion; Attendance: 11,586

23 April 2019 32nd week	SC Heerenveen	2–2	VVV-Venlo	Heerenveen
19:45	Michel Vlap 27' 75'	Report	Jay-Roy Grot 56'; Sem Steijn 89'	Stadium: Abe Lenstra Stadion; Attendance: 17,450

12 May 2019 33rd week	SC Heerenveen	2–1	NAC Breda	Heerenveen
14:30	Sam Lammers 41'; Mitchell van Bergen 90'	Report	Menno Koch 81'	Stadium: Abe Lenstra Stadion; Attendance: 18,500

15 May 2019 34th week	FC Utrecht	3–1	SC Heerenveen	Utrecht
19:30	Willem Janssen 41'; Sander van de Streek 48'; Cyriel Dessers 81'	Report	Ben Rienstra 30'	Stadium: Stadion Galgenwaard; Attendance: 18,646

== KNVB Cup ==
26 September 2018 KNVB Cup 1st round	VV Katwijk	0–1 (a.e.t.)	SC Heerenveen	Katwijk
19:45		Report	Sam Lammers 116'	Stadium: Sportpark De Krom; Attendance: 1,750

31 October 2018 KNVB Cup 2nd round	RKSV Groene Ster	1–3	SC Heerenveen	Heerlerheide
19:45	Chefrino Eind 40'	Report	Ben Rienstra 46'; Arbër Zeneli 49'; Sam Lammers 69'	Stadium: Sportpark Pronsebroek

19 December 2018 KNVB Cup Round of 16	ODIN '59	1–3	SC Heerenveen	Heemskerk
18:30	Mitchel Bormann 2'	Report	Michel Vlap 9'; Sam Lammers 54'; Pelle van Amersfoort 86'	Stadium: Rabobank IJmond Stadion; Attendance: 3,243

24 januari 2019 KNVB Cup Quarter final	AFC Ajax	3–1	SC Heerenveen	Amsterdam
20:45	Noussair Mazraoui 3'; Donny van de Beek 16' 38'	Report	Pelle van Amersfoort 84'	Stadium: Johan Cruyff Arena; Attendance: 43,819
