= Ivan Fiolić =

Croatian footballer

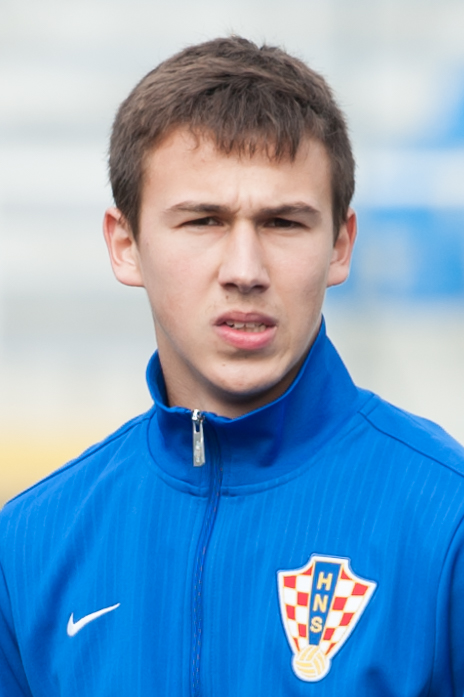
- Fiolić with Croatia U19 in 2015

Personal information
- Full name: Ivan Fiolić
- Date of birth: 29 April 1996 (age 30)
- Place of birth: Zagreb, Croatia
- Height: 1.76 m (5 ft 9 1/2 in)
- Position: Attacking midfielder

Team information
- Current team: Kauno Žalgiris
- Number: 17

Youth career
- 2004–2014: Dinamo Zagreb

Senior career*
Years	Team	Apps	(Gls)
2014–2015	Dinamo Zagreb II	25	(8)
2014–2018	Dinamo Zagreb	38	(4)
2015–2016	→ Lokomotiva (loan)	37	(8)
2018–2021	Genk	4	(0)
2019–2020	→ AEK Larnaca (loan)	13	(3)
2020–2021	→ Cracovia (loan)	33	(1)
2021–2023	Osijek	57	(6)
2024	Tianjin Jinmen Tiger	17	(1)
2025–2026	Gorica	26	(0)
2026–	Kauno Žalgiris	1	(0)

International career
2010	Croatia U14	2	(0)
2011	Croatia U15	2	(0)
2012	Croatia U16	7	(1)
2012–2013	Croatia U17	13	(1)
2013–2014	Croatia U18	2	(0)
2014–2015	Croatia U19	8	(0)
2015–2018	Croatia U21	9	(0)
- * Club domestic league appearances and goals as of 20 July 2026

Ivan Fiolić (born 29 April 1996) is a Croatian professional footballer who plays as an attacking midfielder for Toplyga club Kauno Žalgiris.

== Club career ==
Fiolić is a youth exponent from Dinamo Zagreb. He made his Prva HNL debut on 10 May 2014 against NK Istra 1961 in a 2–1 away defeat. Under the tutelage of Zoran Mamić, Fiolić made seven first team appearances in the 2014–15 season.

Fiolić was loaned to Dinamo's affiliate Lokomotiva to gain further experience. In the 2015–16 season at Lokomotiva, Fiolić made 35 appearances in all competitions, scoring eight goals and becoming the club's captain. In the 2016–17 season, he was a major part of Lokomotiva reaching the playoff stage of the Europa League qualifying for the first time in its history as he scored three times in seven matches. By the end of August 2016, Fiolić had made 14 appearances for Lokomotiva in the new season, scoring four goals.

On 29 August 2016, Fiolić's loan ended and he returned to Dinamo Zagreb.

In 2018, Fiolić signed for Belgian club Genk.

On 18 December 2023, NK Osijek announced his departure from the club as he joined Chinese Super League side Tianjin Jinmen Tiger.

== International career ==
From 2010 to 2018, Fiolić made a total of 43 appearances and scored twice for Croatia youth national teams, spanning from under-14s to under-21s.

== Career statistics ==
As of match played 21 July 2026

Appearances and goals by club, season and competition
Club	Season	League			National cup (Note: Includes Croatian Cup, Belgian Cup, Cypriot Cup, Polish Cup, Chinese FA Cup)		Continental		Other		Total	
Club	Season	Division	Apps	Goals	Apps	Goals	Apps	Goals	Apps	Goals	Apps	Goals
Dinamo Zagreb	2013–14	Prva HNL	2	0	0	0	—		—		2	0
Dinamo Zagreb	2014–15	Prva HNL	5	0	1	0	—		—		6	0
Dinamo Zagreb	2016–17	Prva HNL	8	1	4	0	4 (Note: Appearance(s) in UEFA Champions League)	0	—		16	1
Dinamo Zagreb	2017–18	Prva HNL	21	3	4	2	2 (Note: Appearances in UEFA Europa League)	0	—		27	5
Dinamo Zagreb	2018–19	Prva HNL	2	0	—		2	0	—		4	0
Dinamo Zagreb	Total		38	4	9	2	8	0	—		55	6
Lokomotiva (loan)	2015–16	Prva HNL	30	7	3	0	2	1	—		35	8
Lokomotiva (loan)	2016–17	Prva HNL	7	1	—		8	3	—		15	4
Lokomotiva (loan)	Total		37	8	3	0	10	4	—		50	12
Genk	2018–19	Belgian First Division A	4	0	2	0	2	0	—		8	0
AEK Larnaca (loan)	2019–20	Cypriot First Division	13	3	2	0	—		—		15	3
Cracovia (loan)	2019–20	Ekstraklasa	14	0	2	0	—		—		16	0
Cracovia (loan)	2020–21	Ekstraklasa	19	1	3	0	0	0	1 (Note: Appearance in Polish Super Cup)	0	23	1
Cracovia (loan)	Total		33	1	5	0	0	0	1	0	39	1
Osijek	2021–22	Prva HNL	25	4	3	1	2 (Note: Appearances in UEFA Europa Conference League)	0	—		30	5
Osijek	2022–23	Prva HNL	21	0	1	0	2	0	—		24	0
Osijek	2023–24	Prva HNL	11	2	1	0	3	0	—		15	2
Osijek	Total		57	6	5	1	7	0	—		69	7
Tianjin Jinmen Tiger	2024	Chinese Super League	17	1	1	0	—		—		18	1
Gorica	2024–25	Prva HNL	4	0	0	0	—		—		4	0
Gorica	2025–26	Prva HNL	22	0	0	0	—		—		22	0
Gorica	Total		26	0	0	0	—		—		26	0
Kauno Žalgiris	2026	TOPLYGA	1	0	0	0	1	0	—		2	0
Career total			226	23	27	3	28	4	1	0	282	30

== Honours ==
Dinamo Zagreb

- Prva HNL: 2013–14, 2014–15, 2017–18
- Croatian Cup: 2014–15, 2017–18

Genk

- Belgian First Division A: 2018–19

Cracovia

- Polish Cup: 2019–20
- Polish Super Cup: 2020

Kauno Žalgiris

- Toplyga: 2026
- Lithuanian Cup: 2026
