= Cornel Râpă =

Romanian footballer

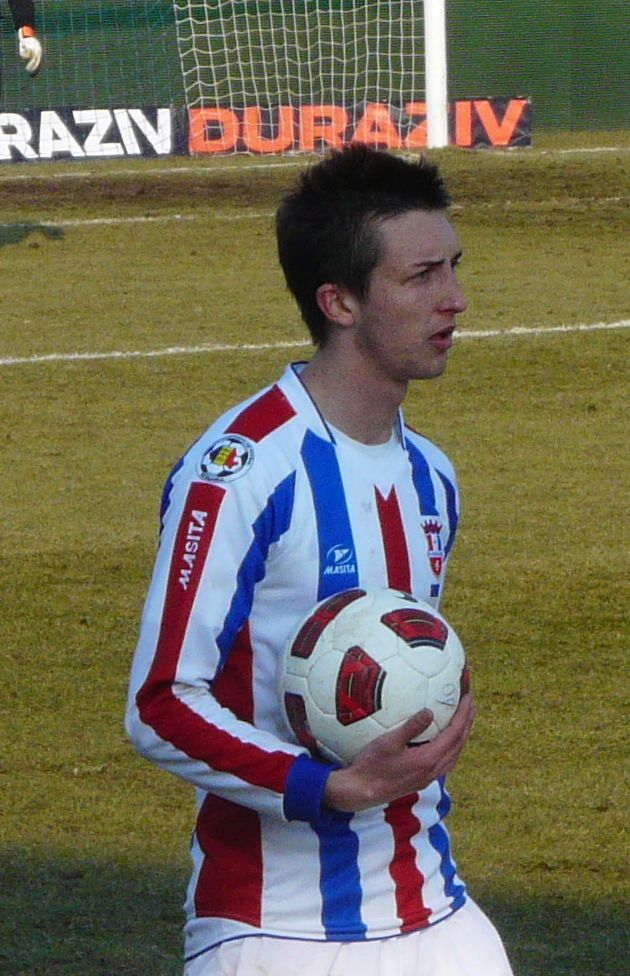
- Râpă in 2011

Personal information
- Full name: Cornel Emilian Râpă
- Date of birth: 16 January 1990 (age 36)
- Place of birth: Galați, Romania
- Height: 1.80 m (5 ft 11 in)
- Position: Right-back

Youth career
- 2005–2008: Oțelul Galați

Senior career*
Years	Team	Apps	(Gls)
2008–2013	Oțelul Galați	118	(1)
2013–2016	Steaua București	49	(1)
2016–2018	Pogoń Szczecin	55	(1)
2018–2024	Cracovia	179	(8)
2024–2025	UTA Arad	26	(0)
Total		427	(11)

International career
2006–2007	Romania U17	3	(0)
2008–2009	Romania U19	6	(2)
2009–2012	Romania U21	9	(0)
2010–2011	Romania	5	(0)
- * Club domestic league appearances and goals

Cornel Râpă (born 16 January 1990) is a Romanian former professional footballer who played as a right-back.

== Club career ==
Râpă made his professional debut for his youth club Oțelul Galați, in 2008. He scored his first professional goal in March 2011, in a match against Universitatea Cluj. In 2013, Râpă left Oțelul Galați in order to join fellow Liga I club Steaua București.

== International career ==
Râpă made his debut for the Romania national team at the age of 20 in 2010 in a friendly game against Italy played in Klagenfurt.

== Career statistics ==
=== Club ===
Appearances and goals by club, season and competition
Club	Season	League			National cup (Note: Includes Cupa României, Polish Cup)		League cup (Note: Includes Cupa Ligii)		Europe		Other		Total	
Club	Season	Division	Apps	Goals	Apps	Goals	Apps	Goals	Apps	Goals	Apps	Goals	Apps	Goals
Oțelul Galați	2008–09	Liga I	9	0	0	0	—		—		—		9	0
Oțelul Galați	2009–10	Liga I	32	0	0	0	—		—		—		32	0
Oțelul Galați	2010–11	Liga I	33	1	1	0	—		—		—		34	1
Oțelul Galați	2011–12	Liga I	30	0	2	0	—		5 (Note: Appearance(s) in UEFA Champions League)	0	1 (Note: Appearance in Supercupa României)	0	38	0
Oțelul Galați	2012–13	Liga I	14	0	2	0	—		—		—		16	0
Oțelul Galați	Total		118	1	5	0	—		5	0	1	0	129	1
Steaua București	2012–13	Liga I	8	0	0	0	—		4 (Note: Appearance(s) in UEFA Europa League)	0	—		12	0
Steaua București	2013–14	Liga I	7	0	3	0	—		0	0	0	0	10	0
Steaua București	2014–15	Liga I	16	0	5	0	3	0	8 (Note: Six appearances and one goal in UEFA Champions League, two appearances in UEFA Europa League)	1	1	0	33	1
Steaua București	2015–16	Liga I	18	1	3	0	2	0	1	0	1	0	25	1
Steaua București	Total		49	1	11	0	5	0	13	1	2	0	80	2
Pogoń Szczecin	2016–17	Ekstraklasa	24	1	5	0	—		—		—		29	1
Pogoń Szczecin	2017–18	Ekstraklasa	31	0	2	0	—		—		—		33	0
Pogoń Szczecin	Total		55	1	7	0	—		—		—		62	1
Cracovia	2018–19	Ekstraklasa	33	1	1	0	—		—		—		34	1
Cracovia	2019–20	Ekstraklasa	35	3	3	0	—		2	0	—		40	3
Cracovia	2020–21	Ekstraklasa	30	1	5	1	—		1	0	1 (Note: Appearance in Polish Super Cup)	0	37	2
Cracovia	2021–22	Ekstraklasa	33	3	0	0	—		—		—		33	3
Cracovia	2022–23	Ekstraklasa	26	0	2	0	—		—		—		28	0
Cracovia	2023–24	Ekstraklasa	22	0	3	0	—		—		—		25	0
Cracovia	Total		179	8	14	1	—		3	0	1	0	197	9
UTA Arad	2024–25	Liga I	26	0	3	0	—		—		—		29	0
Career total			427	11	40	1	5	0	21	1	4	0	497	13

=== International ===
Appearances and goals by national team and year
National team	Year	Apps	Goals
Romania
Romania	2010	1	0
Romania	2011	4	0
Total		5	0

== Honours ==
Oțelul Galați

- Liga I: 2010–11
- Supercupa României: 2011

Steaua București

- Liga I: 2012–13, 2013–14, 2014–15
- Cupa României: 2014–15
- Cupa Ligii: 2014–15, 2015–16
- Supercupa României: 2013

Cracovia

- Polish Cup: 2019–20
- Polish Super Cup: 2020
