= 2020 Polish Super Cup =

Football competition

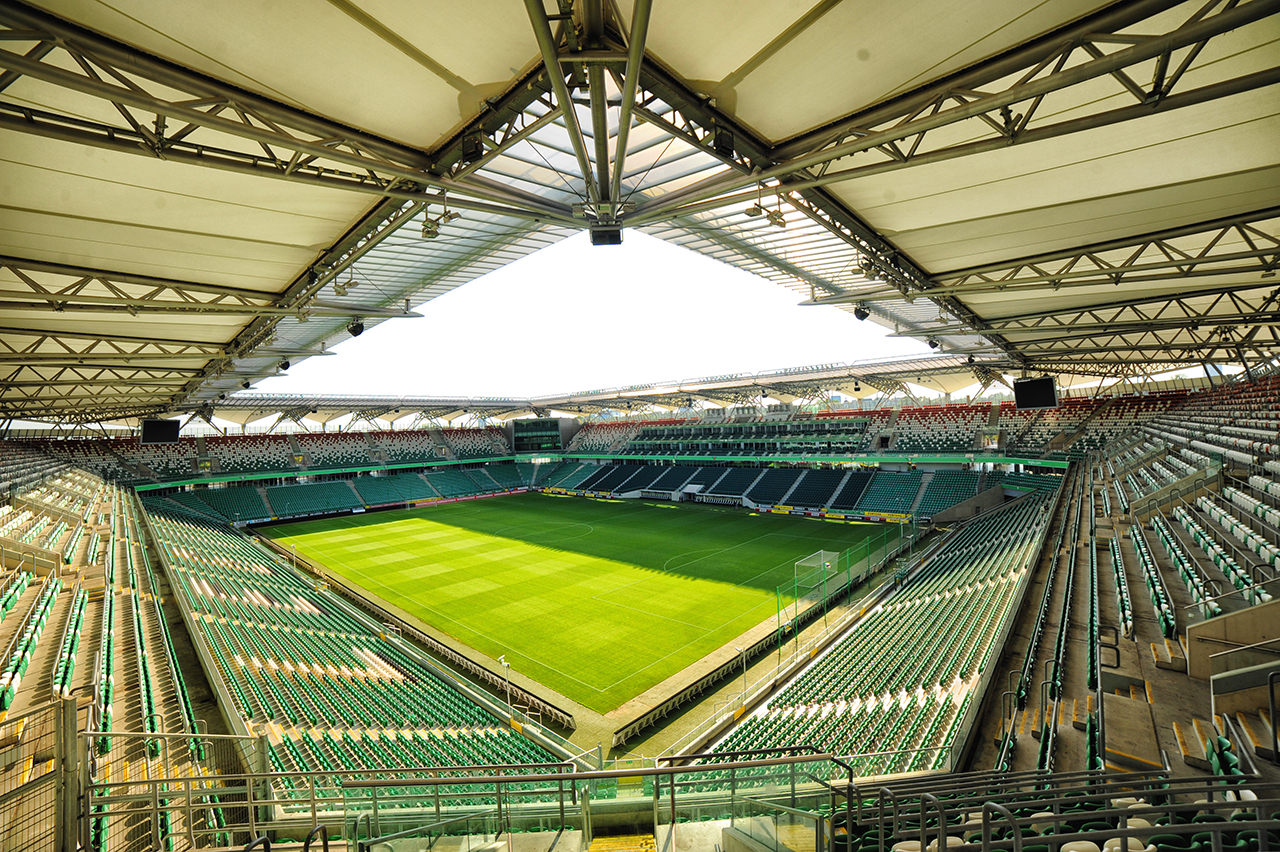
- The Polish Army Stadium in Warsaw hosted the final.
Legia Warsaw	Cracovia
0	0
- Cracovia won 5–4 on penalties
- Date: 9 October 2020 (Note: Match originally scheduled to 9 August 2020, 20:00 CEST (UTC+02:00) was postponed due to COVID-19 disease detection in Legia Warsaw team.)
- Venue: Stadion Wojska Polskiego, Warsaw
- Referee: Wojciech Myć (Lublin)
- Attendance: 6,475 (Note: Match have been played with "no more than 25 percent of the number of seats allocated to the public" due to the COVID-19 pandemic.)
- Weather: 13 °C (55 °F)

The 2020 Polish Super Cup was the 29th Polish Super Cup, an annual Polish football match played between the reigning winners of the Ekstraklasa and Polish Cup. This season Ekstraklasa champion Legia Warsaw met Polish Cup champion Cracovia.

The match originally scheduled on 9 August 2020 was finally held on 9 October 2020 at the Stadion Wojska Polskiego in Warsaw – the home of the Ekstraklasa champions Legia. On 8 August 2020, the Polish Football Association announced that the match was canceled due to suspicion of COVID-19 in one member of the medical staff of Legia Warsaw. On 18 September 2020 Polish Football Association announced a new SuperCup match date on 9 October 2020.

Cracovia played their first ever Super Cup match, while Legia tried to win their 5th SuperCup after not being in the Super Cup last year for the first time since 2010.

The game finished with a 0–0 draw after regular time. The extra-time has not been played. Cracovia won 5–4 on penalties.

== Match ==
9 October 2020
20:15 CEST (UTC+02:00)

Legia Warsaw	0–0	Cracovia
	Report; Report
Penalties
Antolić (penalty scored); Valencia (penalty scored); Cholewiak (penalty scored); Wszołek (penalty missed); Juranović (penalty scored)	4–5	(penalty scored) van Amersfoort; (penalty scored) Sadiković; (penalty scored) Vestenický; (penalty scored) Fiolić; (penalty scored) Dimun

Stadion Wojska Polskiego, Warsaw
Attendance: 6,475
Referee: Wojciech Myć (Lublin)

Legia Warsaw	Cracovia

GK	33	(Poland) Radosław Cierzniak
RB	2	(Croatia) Josip Juranović
CB	5	(Poland) Igor Lewczuk
CB	4	(Poland) Mateusz Wieteska (c)	(substituted off) 23'
LB	16	(Portugal) Luís Rocha	(substituted off) 84'
RM	22	(Poland) Paweł Wszołek
CM	24	(Portugal) André Martins	(substituted off) 77'
CM	67	(Poland) Bartosz Kapustka	(substituted off) 58'
CM	82	(Brazil) Luquinhas
LM	11	(Ecuador) Joel Valencia
CF	9	(Czech Republic) Tomáš Pekhart	(substituted off) 66'
Substitutes:
DF	34	(Spain) Iñaki Astiz	(substituted on) 23'
DF	41	(Poland) Paweł Stolarski	(substituted on) 84'
MF	7	(Croatia) Domagoj Antolić	(substituted on) 58'
MF	17	(Poland) Mateusz Cholewiak	(substituted on) 77'
FW	30	(Poland) Kacper Kostorz
FW	21	(Portugal) Rafael Lopes	(substituted on) 66'
Manager:
(Poland) Czesław Michniewicz

GK	31	(Slovakia) Lukáš Hroššo
RB	2	(Romania) Cornel Râpă	(yellow card) 86'
CB	5	(Spain) Iván Márquez	(yellow card) 90'
CB	88	(Croatia) Matej Rodin
LB	44	(Poland) Dawid Szymonowicz		(substituted off) 56'
RM	14	(Croatia) Ivan Fiolić
CM	10	(Netherlands) Pelle van Amersfoort
CM	8	(Slovakia) Milan Dimun (c)
CM	19	(Bosnia and Herzegovina) Damir Sadiković
LM	9	(Germany) Marcos Álvarez		(substituted off) 78'
CF	7	(Brazil) Rivaldinho		(substituted off) 73'
Substitutes:
GK	40	(Czech Republic) Michal Peškovič
DF	87	(Brazil) Diego Ferraresso	(yellow card) 80'	(substituted on) 56'
MF	16	(Poland) Przemysław Kapek
MF	21	(Brazil) Thiago Souza
FW	26	(Poland) Filip Piszczek		(substituted on) 73'
FW	99	(Slovakia) Tomáš Vestenický		(substituted on) 78'
Manager:
(Poland) Michał Probierz

Match rules

- 90 minutes.
- 30 minutes of extra time if necessary.
- Penalty shoot-out if scores still level.
- Seven named substitutes.
- Maximum of three substitutions.

== See also ==
- 2020–21 Ekstraklasa
- 2020–21 Polish Cup
