= Karol Niemczycki =

Polish footballer (born 1999)

Personal information
- Full name: Karol Stanisław Niemczycki
- Date of birth: 5 July 1999 (age 27)
- Place of birth: Kraków, Poland
- Height: 1.90 m (6 ft 3 in)
- Position: Goalkeeper

Team information
- Current team: Śląsk Wrocław
- Number: 1

Youth career
- –2011: Garbarnia Kraków
- 2011–2014: Cracovia
- 2014–2017: AP Profi Zielonki
- 2017: NAC Breda

Senior career*
| Years | Team | Apps | (Gls) |
| 2017–2020 | NAC Breda | 2 | (0) |
| 2019–2020 | → Puszcza Niepołomice (loan) | 29 | (0) |
| 2020–2023 | Cracovia | 72 | (0) |
| 2023–2024 | Fortuna Düsseldorf | 1 | (0) |
| 2024–2025 | Darmstadt 98 | 0 | (0) |
| 2025 | → Ashdod (loan) | 13 | (0) |
| 2025–2026 | Ashdod | 32 | (0) |
| 2026– | Śląsk Wrocław | 0 | (0) |

International career
| 2018–2019 | Poland U20 | 2 | (0) |
| 2019 | Poland U21 | 1 | (0) |
- * Club domestic league appearances and goals as of 17:11, 23 June 2026 (UTC)

Karol Stanisław Niemczycki (born 5 July 1999) is a Polish professional footballer who plays as a goalkeeper for Ekstraklasa club Śląsk Wrocław.

== Club career ==
In 2019, Niemczycki was loaned to Puszcza Niepołomice.

On 14 August 2020, he joined Cracovia. On 25 May 2023, it was announced he would leave the team at the end of the season.

On 19 July 2023, Niemczycki signed with Fortuna Düsseldorf in German 2. Bundesliga. He made his league debut on the last matchday of the 2023–24 season, in a 3–2 win over 1. FC Magdeburg on 19 May 2024.

On 6 June 2024, Niemczycki joined recently relegated 2. Bundesliga club Darmstadt 98 for an undisclosed fee.

On 29 January 2025, he moved on loan to Israeli side F.C. Ashdod for the rest of the season. He made his debut on 1 February, starting in a 2–2 league draw against Maccabi Petah Tikva. In June 2025, Niemczycki joined Ashdod on a permanent basis, signing a deal until June 2028.

On 17 June 2026, Niemczycki signed for Ekstraklasa side Śląsk Wrocław.

== International career ==
On 23 March 2021, Niemczycki received an additional call-up for the Poland national team games against Andorra and England.

== Career statistics ==
As of match played 13 May 2026

Appearances and goals by club, season and competition
| Club | Season | League | | | National cup (Note: Includes Polish Cup, DFB-Pokal, Israel State Cup) | | Europe | | Other | | Total | |
| Club | Season | Division | Apps | Goals | Apps | Goals | Apps | Goals | Apps | Goals | Apps | Goals |
|---|---|---|---|---|---|---|---|---|---|---|---|---|
| NAC Breda | 2017–18 | Eredivisie | 1 | 0 | 0 | 0 | — | | — | | 1 | 0 |
| NAC Breda | 2018–19 | Eredivisie | 1 | 0 | 0 | 0 | — | | — | | 1 | 0 |
| NAC Breda | Total | | 2 | 0 | 0 | 0 | — | | — | | 2 | 0 |
| Puszcza Niepołomice (loan) | 2019–20 | I liga | 29 | 0 | 0 | 0 | — | | — | | 29 | 0 |
| Cracovia | 2020–21 | Ekstraklasa | 27 | 0 | 5 | 0 | 0 | 0 | 0 | 0 | 32 | 0 |
| Cracovia | 2021–22 | Ekstraklasa | 14 | 0 | 1 | 0 | — | | — | | 15 | 0 |
| Cracovia | 2022–23 | Ekstraklasa | 31 | 0 | 0 | 0 | — | | — | | 31 | 0 |
| Cracovia | Total | | 72 | 0 | 6 | 0 | 0 | 0 | 0 | 0 | 78 | 0 |
| Cracovia II | 2021–22 | III liga, gr. IV | 2 | 0 | — | | — | | — | | 2 | 0 |
| Fortuna Düsseldorf | 2023–24 | 2. Bundesliga | 1 | 0 | 2 | 0 | — | | — | | 3 | 0 |
| Fortuna Düsseldorf II | 2023–24 | Regionalliga West | 3 | 0 | — | | — | | — | | 3 | 0 |
| Darmstadt 98 | 2024–25 | 2. Bundesliga | 0 | 0 | 1 | 0 | — | | — | | 1 | 0 |
| Darmstadt 98 II | 2024–25 | Hessenliga | 5 | 0 | — | | — | | — | | 5 | 0 |
| Ashdod (loan) | 2024–25 | Israeli Premier League | 13 | 0 | 1 | 0 | — | | — | | 14 | 0 |
| Ashdod | 2025–26 | Israeli Premier League | 32 | 0 | 0 | 0 | — | | 5 (Note: Appearances in Toto Cup) | 0 | 37 | 0 |
| Ashdod | Total | | 45 | 0 | 1 | 0 | — | | 5 | 0 | 51 | 0 |
| Śląsk Wrocław | 2026–27 | Ekstraklasa | 0 | 0 | 0 | 0 | — | | — | | 0 | 0 |
| Career total | | | 159 | 0 | 10 | 0 | 0 | 0 | 5 | 0 | 174 | 0 |

== Honours ==
Individual

- Ekstraklasa Young Player of the Month: October 2020
