= Daniel Pik =

Polish footballer

Personal information
- Full name: Daniel Pik
- Date of birth: 20 July 2000 (age 26)
- Place of birth: Pułtusk, Poland
- Height: 1.77 m (5 ft 10 in)
- Position: Forward

Team information
- Current team: Talent Warsaw

Youth career
- –2013: Nadnarwianka Pułtusk
- 2013–2014: Bug Wyszków
- 2014–2016: Nadnarwianka Pułtusk
- 2016–2018: MKS Polonia Warsaw
- 2018: Cracovia

Senior career*
Years	Team	Apps	(Gls)
2018–2022	Cracovia	20	(0)
2019–2022	Cracovia II	18	(4)
2022–2024	Radomiak Radom	29	(0)
2024–2026	Pogoń Siedlce	31	(4)
2026–	Talent Warsaw	0	(0)

International career
2017	Poland U18	3	(0)
- * Club domestic league appearances and goals as of 20:23, 26 May 2026 (UTC)

Daniel Pik (born 20 July 2000) is a Polish professional footballer who plays as a forward for IV liga Masovia club Talent Warsaw.

== Honours ==
Cracovia II

- IV liga Lesser Poland West: 2019–20
