= Rivaldinho =

Brazilian footballer (born 1995)

Personal information
- Full name: Rivaldo Vítor Mosca Ferreira Júnior
- Date of birth: 29 April 1995 (age 31)
- Place of birth: São Paulo, Brazil
- Height: 1.86 m (6 ft 1 in)
- Position: Forward

Team information
- Current team: Muangthong United (on loan from Bangkok United)
- Number: 9

Youth career
- Mogi Mirim
- 2013: Corinthians
- 2013–2014: Mogi Mirim

Senior career*
Years	Team	Apps	(Gls)
2014–2015	Mogi Mirim	27	(7)
2015–2016	Boavista	1	(0)
2016	XV de Piracicaba	0	(0)
2016	Internacional	0	(0)
2016	→ Paysandu (loan)	8	(1)
2017–2018	Dinamo București	30	(5)
2018–2019	Levski Sofia	12	(1)
2019	→ Viitorul Constanța (loan)	11	(2)
2019–2020	Viitorul Constanța	28	(11)
2020–2022	Cracovia	43	(2)
2022–2023	Universitatea Craiova	23	(1)
2023–2025	Farul Constanța	59	(11)
2025	Qingdao Red Lions	19	(6)
2026–	Bangkok United	14	(3)
2026–	→ Muangthong United (loan)	0	(0)
- * Club domestic league appearances and goals as of 00:54, 7 September 2026 (UTC)

Rivaldo Vítor Mosca Ferreira Júnior (born 29 April 1995), commonly known as Rivaldinho, is a Brazilian professional footballer who plays as a forward for Thai League 2 club Muangthong United, on loan from Bangkok United.

== Club career ==
=== Early career ===
After playing youth football for Mogi Mirim and Corinthians, Rivaldinho began his senior career at Mogi Mirim making 47 appearances in all competitions for the club.

He then moved to Portuguese club Boavista in August 2015, where he made just one league appearance (versus Moreirense) and two appearances in the domestic cups (versus Feirense and Operário).

Rivaldinho joined XV de Piracicaba on 18 January 2016. He appeared in 12 matches in the Campeonato Paulista for Piracicaba, scoring three goals, before departing on 12 April. He was signed by Internacional on 10 May 2016, but spent the end of the season on loan at Paysandu.

=== In Romania and Bulgaria ===
On 7 February 2017, Rivaldinho returned to Europe, signing a 3 1/2-year contract with Romanian team Dinamo București.

He scored his first goal for the club on 5 April, in a 2–0 league win against CFR Cluj. On 27 July 2017, in a Europa League qualifying game against Athletic Bilbao, Rivaldinho scored from a "terrific" long–range effort to earn Dinamo a 1–1 draw against the Spanish team.

On 27 January 2018, Rivaldinho signed a 2 1/2-year contract with Bulgarian club Levski Sofia. He was on one of the club's largest salaries, but suffered from injuries.

In January 2019 he returned to Romania joining Viitorul Constanța on loan. He signed permanently for the club in July 2019.

=== Poland ===
In August 2020, he signed for Polish club Cracovia. On 20 July 2022, he left the club by mutual consent.

=== Return to Romania ===
On 26 July 2022, Universitatea Craiova announced the signing of Rivaldinho on a two-year contract. In May 2023 he moved to Farul Constanța.

=== China and Thailand ===
In February 2025, Rivaldinho signed for Chinese club Qingdao Red Lions. On 7 January 2026, he joined Thai League 1 club Bangkok United. He moved on loan to Muangthong United in September 2026.

== Personal life ==
Rivaldinho is the son of Rose Mosca, and former Brazil and FC Barcelona player, Rivaldo. Both he and his father scored in the same Brazilian Série B game for Mogi Mirim in July 2015.

== Career statistics ==
As of 8 November 2025.

Appearances and goals by club, season and competition
Club	Season	League			National cup (Note: Includes Taça de Portugal, Cupa României, Bulgarian Cup, Polish Cup)		League cup (Note: Includes Taça da Liga, Cupa Ligii)		Other		Total	
Club	Season	Division	Apps	Goals	Apps	Goals	Apps	Goals	Apps	Goals	Apps	Goals
Mogi Mirim	2014	Série C	12	1	—		—		9 (Note: Appearances in Campeonato Paulista)	2	21	3
Mogi Mirim	2015	Série B	15	6	—		—		11	2	26	8
Mogi Mirim	Total		27	7	—		—		20	4	47	11
Boavista	2015–16	Primeira Liga	1	0	1	0	1	0	—		3	0
XV de Piracicaba	2016	Paulista	—		—		—		12	3	12	3
Paysandu (loan)	2016	Série B	8	1	0	0	—		0	0	8	1
Dinamo București	2016–17	Liga I	11	2	1	0	2	0	0	0	14	2
Dinamo București	2017–18	Liga I	19	3	1	0	0	0	2 (Note: Appearances in UEFA Europa League)	1	22	4
Dinamo București	Total		30	5	2	0	2	0	2	1	36	6
Levski Sofia	2017–18	First League	8	1	0	0	—		0	0	8	1
Levski Sofia	2018–19	First League	4	0	1	0	—		0	0	5	0
Levski Sofia	Total		12	1	1	0	0	0	0	0	13	1
Viitorul Constanța (loan)	2018–19	Liga I	11	2	4	2	—		0	0	15	4
Viitorul Constanța	2019–20	Liga I	28	11	0	0	—		0	0	28	11
Cracovia	2020–21	Ekstraklasa	24	1	5	1	—		2 (Note: One appearance in Polish Super Cup, one appearance in UEFA Europa League)	0	31	2
Cracovia	2021–22	Ekstraklasa	19	1	1	0	—		0	0	20	1
Cracovia	Total		43	2	6	1	—		2	0	51	3
Cracovia II	2021–22	III liga, group IV	3	1	—		—		—		3	1
Universitatea Craiova	2022–23	Liga I	23	1	2	0	—		2 (Note: Appearances in UEFA Europa Conference League)	0	27	1
Farul Constanța	2023–24	Liga I	35	6	2	0	—		9 (Note: One appearance in Supercupa României, two appearances in UEFA Champions League, six appearances and two goals in UEFA Europa Conference League)	2	46	8
Farul Constanța	2024–25	Liga I	24	5	2	1	—		—		26	6
Farul Constanța	Total		59	11	4	1	—		9	2	72	14
Qingdao Red Lions	2025	China League One	19	6	0	0	—		—		19	6
Career total			264	48	20	4	3	0	47	10	334	62

== Honours ==
Dinamo București

- Cupa Ligii: 2016–17

Levski Sofia

- Bulgarian Cup runner-up: 2017–18

Viitorul Constanța

- Cupa României: 2018–19

Cracovia

- Polish Super Cup: 2020

Farul Constanța

- Supercupa României runner-up: 2023
