= Diego Ferraresso =

Bulgarian footballer (born 1992)

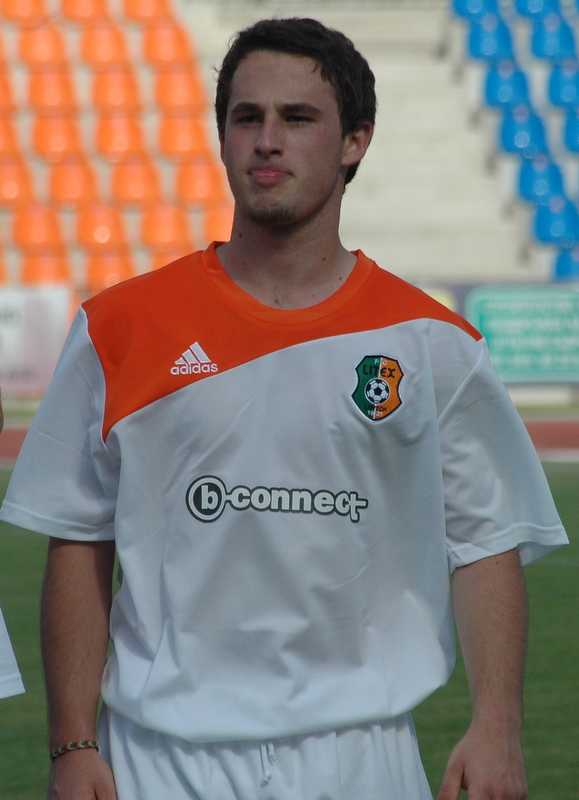
- Diego with Litex in 2009

Personal information
- Full name: Diego Gustavo Ferraresso Scheda
- Date of birth: 21 May 1992 (age 34)
- Place of birth: Serra Negra, Brazil
- Height: 1.71 m (5 ft 7 1/2 in)
- Positions: Full-back; winger

Team information
- Current team: Slavia Sofia
- Number: 87

Youth career
- 2007–2009: Litex Lovech

Senior career*
Years	Team	Apps	(Gls)
2009–2012	Litex Lovech	13	(5)
2011–2012	→ Chavdar Etropole (loan)	36	(6)
2012–2014	Lokomotiv Plovdiv	60	(3)
2014–2016	Slavia Sofia	48	(0)
2016–2021	Cracovia	72	(1)
2021–2023	Botev Vratsa	52	(1)
2023–2025	Gloria Buzău	39	(0)
2025–	Slavia Sofia	47	(0)

International career
2012	Bulgaria U21	2	(0)
- * Club domestic league appearances and goals as of 10 November 2026

Diego Gustavo Ferraresso Scheda (Bulgarian: Диего Густаво Фераресо Скеда; born 21 May 1992), sometimes known as just Diego, is a professional footballer who plays as a full-back for Bulgarian First League club Slavia Sofia. Born in Brazil, he has represented Bulgaria at youth level.

== Career ==
Diego Ferraresso started to play football in a private junior school of São Paulo. He comes from a poor family.

=== Litex Lovech ===
He moved to Bulgaria, joining Litex Lovech's academy, after catching the eye of the player agent Rogério Pereira. Ferares made his team debut for Litex Lovech in a friendly match against Macedonian FK Pelister on July 1, 2008. In his first months with Litex, Diego Ferraresso played for the reserve squad. Diego's first official match was against PFC Belasitsa Petrich on May 15, 2009. He entered as a substitution in the 78 minute and scored his first goal for Litex. On June 14, 2009, Diego Ferraresso scored a hat-trick against Spartak Varna. He ended the 2008–09 season with 5 goals in 4 league matches.

=== Chavdar Etropole ===
After two seasons in Litex Lovech in 2011 he joined to "B" group team Chavdar Etropole. He played two seasons, made 36 caps and scored six goals.

In the summer of 2012, Ferraresso spent approximately a month training with Botev Plovdiv, receiving the approval of the manager Ferario Spasov. However, the "canaries" were unable to sign him, as with his transfer they would have exceeded the limit on non-EU players in the team.

=== Lokomotiv Plovdiv ===
For 2012–13 season, he signed with Lokomotiv Plovdiv.

=== Botev Vratsa ===
After a five-year stay with Cracovia, in September 2021 Diego Ferraresso returned to Bulgaria, being close to signing with Dobrudzha Dobrich, but eventually joining Botev Vratsa that was managed by compatriot Daniel Morales.

== International career ==
In June 2012, Diego Ferraresso received Bulgarian citizenship after he had lived in the country for five years. Same year he received a call up for a training camp of Bulgaria U21. In an interview for the Brazilian web magazine Medium in April 2018, Diego showed his desire to represent Bulgaria on international level and to play in the FIFA World Cup with the team.

== Honours ==
Litex Lovech

- Bulgarian A Group: 2009–10
- Bulgarian Supercup: 2010

Cracovia

- Polish Cup: 2019–20
- Polish Super Cup: 2020
