= Michał Ilków-Gołąb =

Polish footballer

Personal information
- Date of birth: 11 April 1985 (age 41)
- Place of birth: Wrocław, Poland
- Height: 1.83 m (6 ft 0 in)
- Position: Right-back

Team information
- Current team: Chrobry Głogów (assistant coach)

Senior career*
Years	Team	Apps	(Gls)
–2003	KS Łozina		
2003–2004	Polar Wrocław	10	(1)
2004–2006	FCK II	25+	(7+)
2006–2007	Śląsk Wrocław	9	(0)
2007–2009	Miedź Legnica	51	(17)
2009–2011	Stilon Gorzów Wielkopolski	44	(7)
2011–2012	Zawisza Bydgoszcz	27	(2)
2012–2015	Chrobry Głogów	66	(16)
2015	Miedź Legnica	3	(1)
2015–2023	Chrobry Głogów	182	(21)

Managerial career
- 2023: Chrobry Głogów II (assistant)
- 2023–: Chrobry Głogów (assistant)
- * Club domestic league appearances and goals

Michał Ilków-Gołąb (born 11 April 1985) is a Polish former professional footballer who played as a right-back. He currently serves as the assistant coach of Chrobry Głogów.

== Career ==
Before the second half of the 2004–05 season, he signed for the reserves of 1. FC Kaiserslautern II in the German Bundesliga.

In 2009, Ilków-Gołąb signed for Polish second division team Stilon Gorzów Wielkopolski, where he made 47 appearances and scored 7 goals. On 1 August 2009, he debuted for Stilon Gorzów Wielkopolski during a 2–1 win over MKS Kluczbork. On 17 October 2009, Ilków-Gołąb scored his first goal for Stilon Gorzów Wielkopolski during a 2–1 loss to Podbeskidzie Bielsko-Biała.

== Honours ==
Chrobry Głogów

- II liga West: 2013–14
