= Pelle van Amersfoort =

Dutch footballer (born 1996)

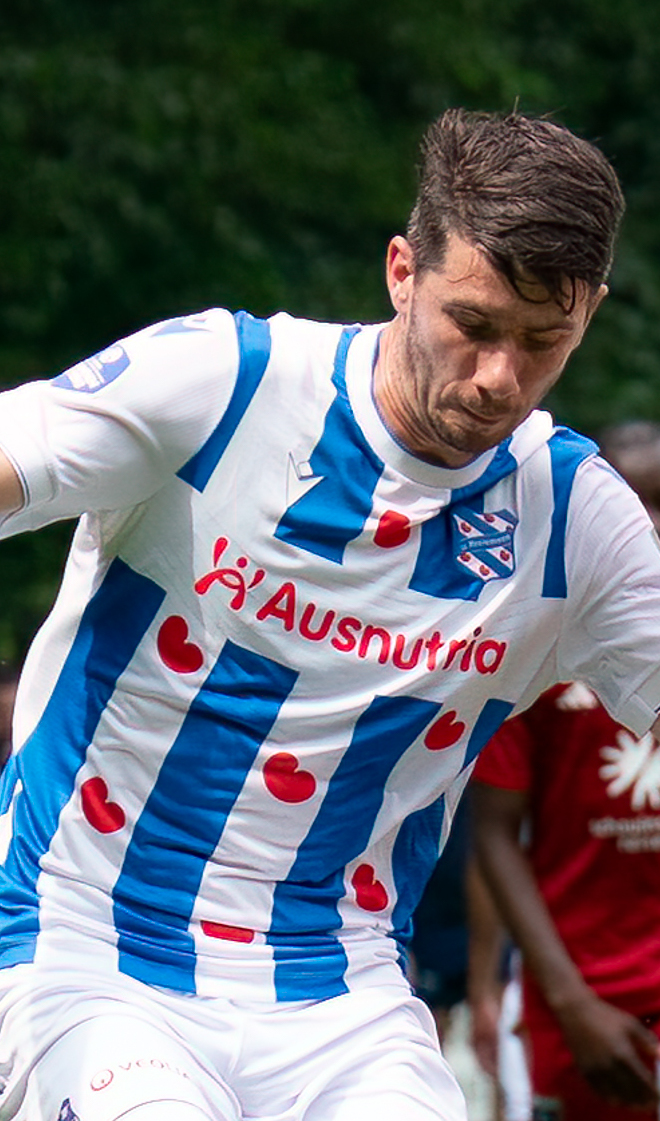
- Van Amersfoort with Heerenveen in 2023

Personal information
- Date of birth: 1 April 1996 (age 30)
- Place of birth: Heemskerk, Netherlands
- Height: 1.93 m (6 ft 4 in)
- Position: Attacking midfielder

Team information
- Current team: Perugia
- Number: 30

Senior career*
Years	Team	Apps	(Gls)
2014–2019	Heerenveen	90	(9)
2015–2016	→ Almere City (loan)	31	(8)
2019–2022	Cracovia	95	(22)
2023–2024	Heerenveen	50	(13)
2024–2026	Al Shahaniya	44	(19)
2026–	Perugia	0	(0)
- * Club domestic league appearances and goals as of 26 September 2026

Pelle van Amersfoort (born 1 April 1996) is a Dutch professional footballer who plays as an attacking midfielder for Serie C club Perugia. Throughout his career, Van Amersfoort has played professionally across multiple leagues in Europe and Asia.

== Club career ==
Born in Heemskerk, Van Amersfoort is a youth exponent of Heerenveen. He made his Eredivisie debut on 20 September 2014 against Vitesse Arnhem, replacing Morten Thorsby in the 66th minute of a 1–1 draw. For the 2015–16 season, he joined Eerste Divisie club Almere City on loan, making 31 league appearances and scoring 8 goals. He subsequently returned to Heerenveen, where he played for the following three seasons.

In July 2019, Van Amersfoort signed for Polish Ekstraklasa club Cracovia. During his three-year tenure in Poland, he scored 22 league goals and contributed to the club's victories in the Polish Cup and Polish Super Cup in 2020.

In November 2022, Van Amersfoort returned to Heerenveen on a contract running until mid-2025. He later moved abroad again in July 2024, joining Qatar Stars League side Al Shahaniya.

On 7 September 2026, Van Amersfoort transferred to Italian Serie C club Perugia.

== Career statistics ==
As of match played 26 September 2026

Club	Season	League			National cup (Note: Includes Polish Cup, KNVB Cup, Emir Cup)		League cup (Note: Includes Qatari Stars Cup)		Continental		Other		Total	
Club	Season	Division	Apps	Goals	Apps	Goals	Apps	Goals	Apps	Goals	Apps	Goals	Apps	Goals
Heerenveen	2014–15	Eredivisie	10	0	0	0	–		–		0	0	10	0
Almere City (loan)	2015–16	Eerste Divisie	31	8	2	0	–		–		2 (Note: Appearances in Eerste Divisie promotion play-offs)	0	35	8
Heerenveen	2016–17	Eredivisie	15	1	2	1	–		–		–		17	2
Heerenveen	2017–18	Eredivisie	27	6	2	1	–		–		1 (Note: Appearances in Eredivisie European competition play-offs)	0	30	7
Heerenveen	2018–19	Eredivisie	38	2	4	5	–		–		–		42	7
Heerenveen	Total		90	9	8	7	–		–		1	0	99	16
Cracovia	2019–20	Ekstraklasa	34	8	5	3	–		2 (Note: Appearance(s) in UEFA Europa League)	0	–		41	11
Cracovia	2020–21	Ekstraklasa	28	6	5	2	–		1	0	1 (Note: Appearance in Polish Super Cup)	0	34	8
Cracovia	2021–22	Ekstraklasa	33	8	1	0	–		–		–		34	8
Cracovia	Total		95	22	11	5	–		3	0	1	0	110	27
Heerenveen	2022–23	Eredivisie	19	3	2	1	–		–		2 (Note: Appearances in Eredivisie European competition play-offs)	0	23	4
Heerenveen	2023–24	Eredivisie	31	10	2	3	–		–		–		33	13
Heerenveen	Total		50	13	4	4	–		–		2	0	56	17
Al Shahaniya	2024–25	Qatar Stars League	22	15	2	1	4	3	–		–		28	19
Perugia	2026–27	Serie C	0	0	0	0	–		–		0	0		
Career total			298	67	27	17	4	3	3	0	6	0	338	87

== International career ==
Van Amersfoort has represented the Netherlands across various youth international levels, earning caps from the Under-17 squad up to the Under-21 team.

Team	Year	Apps	Goals
Netherlands U17	2013	4	2
Netherlands U18	2013	4	1
Netherlands U19	2014–2015	13	6
Netherlands U20	2015–2016	9	1
Netherlands U21	2017–2018	6	1
Total		36	11

== Honours ==
Cracovia

- Polish Cup: 2019–20
- Polish Super Cup: 2020
