= Iván Márquez (footballer) =

Spanish footballer (born 1994)

Personal information
- Full name: Iván Márquez Álvarez
- Date of birth: 9 June 1994 (age 32)
- Place of birth: Marbella, Spain
- Height: 1.91 m (6 ft 3 in)
- Position: Centre-back

Team information
- Current team: Fortuna Sittard
- Number: 44

Youth career
- Málaga

Senior career*
Years	Team	Apps	(Gls)
2013–2015	Málaga B	2	(0)
2014	→ San Pedro (loan)	12	(0)
2014–2015	→ El Palo (loan)	32	(2)
2015–2016	Atlético Madrid B	28	(0)
2016–2017	Osasuna B	20	(1)
2016–2017	Osasuna	4	(0)
2017–2018	Valencia B	22	(2)
2018–2020	Korona Kielce	48	(0)
2020–2021	Cracovia	17	(0)
2021–2023	NEC Nijmegen	61	(3)
2023–2025	1. FC Nürnberg	21	(2)
2024–2025	→ NEC Nijmegen (loan)	28	(2)
2025–	Fortuna Sittard	32	(1)
- * Club domestic league appearances and goals as of 21 May 2026

Iván Márquez Álvarez (born 9 June 1994) is a Spanish professional footballer who plays as a central defender for Eredivisie club Fortuna Sittard.

== Career ==
Márquez was born in Marbella, Málaga, Andalusia, and represented Málaga CF as a youth. He made his debut for the reserves on 13 October 2013, coming on as a late substitute in a 1–2 Tercera División away loss against Linares Deportivo.

Rarely used by Málaga, Márquez subsequently served loan stints at UD San Pedro and CD El Palo, the latter in Segunda División B. On 23 June 2015, he joined another reserve team, Atlético Madrid B in the fourth tier.

On 28 July 2016, Márquez moved to CA Osasuna, being assigned to the reserves in the third division. He made his first-team debut on 30 November, starting in a 1–0 away loss against Granada CF, for the season's Copa del Rey.

Márquez made his La Liga debut on 4 December 2016, starting in a 3–1 loss at Sporting de Gijón.

On 5 August 2020, he signed for Cracovia.

On 15 July 2024, Márquez returned to NEC Nijmegen on loan with an option to buy.

On 1 August 2025, Márquez signed a three-year contract with Fortuna Sittard, returning to Eredivisie.

== Honours ==
Cracovia

- Polish Super Cup: 2020
