= Damir Sadiković =

Bosnian footballer

Personal information
- Date of birth: 7 April 1995 (age 31)
- Place of birth: Cologne, Germany
- Height: 1.88 m (6 ft 2 in)
- Position: Midfielder

Team information
- Current team: Stupčanica
- Number: 24

Youth career
- –2012: Radnik Hadžići
- 2012–2013: Željezničar

Senior career*
Years	Team	Apps	(Gls)
2013–2017	Željezničar	64	(6)
2016–2017	→ Krško (loan)	18	(0)
2018–2019	Mladost Doboj Kakanj	23	(0)
2019–2020	Željezničar	38	(3)
2020–2022	Cracovia	31	(0)
2022	Cracovia II	1	(0)
2022–2023	Kolubara	34	(2)
2023–2024	Napredak Kruševac	13	(1)
2024–2025	Sloga Meridian	10	(0)
2025	Igman Konjic	8	(0)
2025–2026	Radnik Hadžići	10	(3)
2026–	Stupčanica	0	(0)

International career
2013	Bosnia and Herzegovina U19	6	(0)
2015–2016	Bosnia and Herzegovina U21	6	(0)
2021	Bosnia and Herzegovina	1	(0)
- * Club domestic league appearances and goals as of 14:25, 21 February 2026 (UTC)

Damir Sadiković (born 7 April 1995) is a professional footballer who plays as a midfielder for First League of FBiH club Stupčanica. Born in Germany, he represented the Bosnia and Herzegovina national team.

== Club career ==
=== Early career ===
Sadiković began his football career at Radnik Hadžići, before leaving for Željezničar in August 2012 where he joined the youth team.

=== Željezničar ===
While Sadiković was still a part of the Željezničar youth team, he was called up to the first team in January 2013. That year in May, he won the 2012–13 Bosnian Premier League. He made 64 league appearances and scored 6 goals during his period playing for Željezničar.

While at Željezničar, Sadiković was loaned out to Krško for the 2016–17 Slovenian PrvaLiga season. After his loan ended, he left Željezničar.

=== Mladost Doboj Kakanj ===
On 25 September 2017, Sadiković signed a one-year deal contract with the possibility of an extension for one more year with Mladost Doboj Kakanj. He left Mladost on 14 February 2019 to join Željezničar.

=== Return to Željezničar ===
On 15 February 2019, Sadiković returned to Željezničar and signed a one-and-a-half-year contract, with a possibility of an extension for one more year.

Sadiković made his first appearance since returning to the club on 24 February, in a 1–0 loss to Radnik Bijeljina, coming in as an 82nd-minute substitute for Haris Hajdarević. He scored his first goal in his second spell with the club on 20 April 2019 in a 3–0 home win against Krupa.

On 10 August 2019, Sadiković made his 100th appearance for Željezničar in a 2–0 away league win against Čelik Zenica.

=== Cracovia ===
On 5 October 2020, Sadiković signed a three-year contract with Polish Ekstraklasa club Cracovia for a €200.000 transfer fee. He made his debut for Cracovia in the 2020 Polish Super Cup triumph against Legia Warsaw on 9 October 2020. On 14 July 2022, after not making an appearance since November 2021, Sadiković left the club by mutual consent.

=== Kolubara ===
On 25 July 2022, Sadiković joined Serbian side Kolubara on a two-year deal. He debuted in a league win against Mladost Lučani on 31 July.

=== Napredak Kruševac ===
In September 2023, Sadiković left Kolubara to join Serbian SuperLiga club Napredak Kruševac.

== International career ==
Sadiković has represented Bosnia and Herzegovina at under-19 and under-21 levels. He made six appearances for both selections respectively between 2013 and 2016. He made his debut for the senior Bosnia and Herzegovina national team in a friendly 0–0 draw against Montenegro on 2 June 2021.

== Career statistics ==
=== Club ===
As of match played 4 April 2024

Appearances and goals by club, season and competition
Club	Season	League			National cup (Note: Includes Bosnia and Herzegovina Cup, Slovenian Cup, Polish Cup, Serbian Cup)		Continental		Other		Total	
Club	Season	Division	Apps	Goals	Apps	Goals	Apps	Goals	Apps	Goals	Apps	Goals
Željezničar	2012–13	Bosnian Premier League	2	0	0	0	—		—		2	0
Željezničar	2013–14	Bosnian Premier League	19	2	4	0	1 (Note: Appearance in UEFA Champions League)	0	—		24	2
Željezničar	2014–15	Bosnian Premier League	27	3	1	0	4 (Note: Appearance(s) in UEFA Europa League)	1	—		32	4
Željezničar	2015–16	Bosnian Premier League	16	1	4	0	6	1	—		26	2
Željezničar	Total		64	6	9	0	11	2	—		84	8
Krško (loan)	2016–17	Slovenian PrvaLiga	18	0	4	0	—		—		22	0
Mladost Doboj Kakanj	2017–18	Bosnian Premier League	8	0	0	0	—		—		8	0
Mladost Doboj Kakanj	2018–19	Bosnian Premier League	15	0	0	0	—		—		15	0
Mladost Doboj Kakanj	Total		23	0	0	0	—		—		23	0
Željezničar	2018–19	Bosnian Premier League	12	1	—		—		—		12	1
Željezničar	2019–20	Bosnian Premier League	20	2	2	1	—		—		22	3
Željezničar	2020–21	Bosnian Premier League	6	0	1	0	1	0	—		8	0
Željezničar	Total		38	3	3	1	1	0	—		42	4
Cracovia	2020–21	Ekstraklasa	20	0	4	0	—		1 (Note: Appearance in Polish Super Cup)	0	25	0
Cracovia	2021–22	Ekstraklasa	11	0	1	0	—		—		12	0
Cracovia	Total		31	0	5	0	—		1	0	37	0
Cracovia II	2021–22	III liga, group IV	1	0	—		—		—		1	0
Kolubara	2022–23	Serbian SuperLiga	29	2	2	0	—		—		31	2
Kolubara	2023–24	Serbian First League	5	0	—		—		—		5	0
Kolubara	Total		34	2	2	0	—		—		36	2
Napredak Kruševac	2023–24	Serbian SuperLiga	4	1	0	0	—		—		4	1
Career total			213	12	23	1	12	2	1	0	249	15

=== International ===
Appearances and goals by national team and year
National team	Year	Apps	Goals
Bosnia and Herzegovina
Bosnia and Herzegovina	2021	1	0
Total		1	0

== Honours ==
Željezničar

- Bosnian Premier League: 2012–13

Cracovia

- Polish Super Cup: 2020
