= Michał Probierz =

Polish footballer and manager (born 1972)

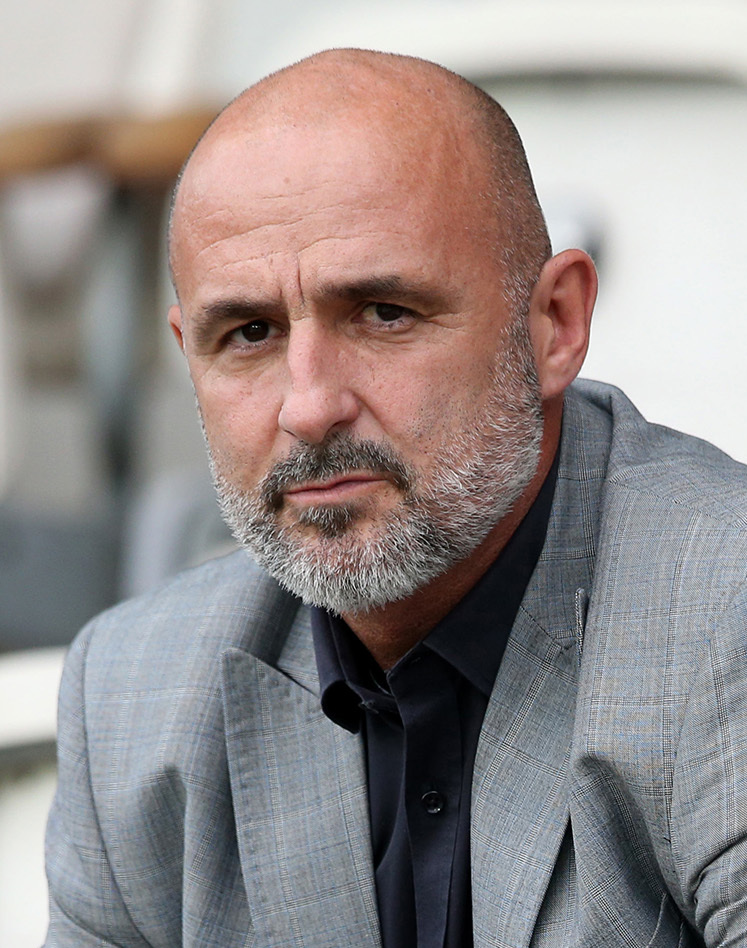
- Probierz as Cracovia manager in 2018

Personal information
- Date of birth: 24 September 1972 (age 54)
- Place of birth: Bytom, Poland
- Height: 1.74 m (5 ft 9 in)
- Position: Midfielder

Youth career
- 1983–1984: ŁKS Łagiewniki
- 1984–1987: Rozbark Bytom
- 1987–1989: Gwarek Zabrze

Senior career*
Years	Team	Apps	(Gls)
1990–1993	Ruch Chorzów	77	(2)
1993–1995	Bayer Uerdingen	12	(0)
1995–1997	SG Wattenscheid 09	30	(2)
1997–2004	Górnik Zabrze	181	(7)
2004	Pogoń Szczecin	2	(0)
2004–2005	Widzew Łódź	21	(1)
Total		323	(12)

International career
- Poland U19
- Poland U21

Managerial career
- 2005–2006: Polonia Bytom
- 2006–2007: Widzew Łódź
- 2007–2008: Polonia Bytom
- 2008–2011: Jagiellonia Białystok
- 2011: ŁKS Łódź
- 2011–2012: Aris
- 2012: Wisła Kraków
- 2012: GKS Bełchatów
- 2013–2014: Lechia Gdańsk
- 2014–2017: Jagiellonia Białystok
- 2017–2021: Cracovia
- 2022: Bruk-Bet Termalica
- 2022–2023: Poland U21
- 2023–2025: Poland
- * Club domestic league appearances and goals

Michał Probierz (born 24 September 1972) is a Polish professional football manager and former player who was most recently the manager of the Poland national team. As a player, he played as a midfielder, spending most of his career with Górnik Zabrze.

As a manager, he won both the Polish Cup and the Polish Super Cup twice, with Jagiellonia Białystok in 2010 and with Cracovia in 2020. He took charge of the Poland U21 team in 2022 before moving up to take charge of the Polish national team in 2023. He subsequently led the national team to qualification for UEFA Euro 2024 but resigned from his position in June 2025.

== Managerial career ==
=== Early career and Jagiellonia Białystok ===
After brief stints at local club Polonia Bytom and also Widzew Łódź, Probierz was appointed manager of Ekstraklasa side Jagiellonia Białystok on 5 July 2008.

He led Jagiellonia to the final of the Polish Cup in the 2009–10 season, their second final appearance in their club history, beating Pogoń Szczecin 1–0 at the Zdzisław Krzyszkowiak Stadium, hence winning their first major Polish trophy. By doing so, Jagiellonia also qualified for a European competition for the first time ever, entering the 2010–11 UEFA Europa League third qualifying round.

At the start of the 2010–11 season, Probierz guided Jagiellonia to the Polish Super Cup win following a 1–0 victory over Lech Poznań. However, Jagiellonia's European adventure was short-lived as they were eliminated in the third qualifying round by Greek side Aris Thessaloniki, losing 4–3 on aggregate. At the end of the season, he left his managerial role on 22 July 2011.

=== ŁKS Łódź ===
On 5 September 2011, Probierz was appointed as the new manager of ŁKS Łódź. His reign at the club lasted just 60 days and six matches, and Probierz announced his departure on 4 November 2011 to join Aris Thessaloniki.

=== Aris ===
Probierz took over as manager of Aris during the 2011–12 season, taking over after Sakis Tsiolis. Probierz's stint at the club was short, and he left Aris by mutual consent on 5 January 2012, with Probierz citing the club's financial issues as the main reason for departing.

=== Wisła Kraków ===
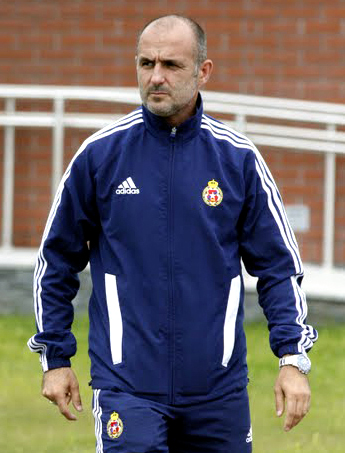
Probierz in 2012 with Wisła Kraków

On 1 March 2012, Probierz moved back to Poland, agreeing to become manager of defending champions Wisła Kraków, replacing Kazimierz Moskal. He resigned on 1 October 2012, with Wisła near the bottom of the table.

=== GKS Bełchatów ===
Probierz joined struggling GKS Bełchatów, who were bottom of the Ekstraklasa on 14 November 2012. He only managed them in four games, failing to win any of them before leaving on 21 December 2012. GKS were eventually relegated, having had three different managers throughout the season.

=== Lechia Gdańsk ===
On 4 June 2013, Probierz agreed to manage Lechia Gdańsk ahead of the 2013–14 season. He stayed until 26 March 2014, where he left the team before they secured a place in the championship round of games and ended the campaign in fourth place, narrowly missing out on a European spot.

=== Return to Jagiellonia Białystok ===
A couple of weeks later after leaving Lechia, Probierz returned to former club Jagiellonia Białystok on 7 April 2014. In his first full season back in charge, he secured a third position in the league table, hence qualifying for the 2015–16 UEFA Europa League first qualifying round. After a poor 2015–16 season, with Jagiellonia ending up in the relegation round, Probierz led the club to their best ever league campaign in the 2016–17 season, finishing second behind champions Legia Warsaw. He unexpectedly quit on 4 June 2017.

=== Cracovia ===
On 21 June 2017, it was announced that Probierz had signed with Ekstraklasa side Cracovia. He led them to a tenth place in the 2017–18 season but still in the relegation round, Cracovia comfortably topped the group, avoiding relegation to I liga.

The next season saw Probierz lead Cracovia to a fourth place in the championship round, and with 3rd placed Lechia Gdańsk having won the 2018–19 Polish Cup, meant they qualified for the 2019–20 UEFA Europa League first qualifying round. Cracovia crashed out of the competition on away goals after drawing 3–3 on aggregate with Slovak team DAC Dunajská Streda.

In 2020, Probierz led Cracovia to win the 2019–20 Polish Cup, which resulted in Cracovia qualifying for European competitions for the second consecutive season.

On 9 November 2021, he relinquished his roles as manager and vice president, and left the club by mutual consent.

=== Bruk-Bet Termalica Nieciecza ===
On 6 January 2022, Probierz joined another Ekstraklasa club Bruk-Bet Termalica Nieciecza, which were at the time last in the league table. He left the club two days later due to Termalica not fulfilling on the promises they made to him at the time of signing the contract.

=== Poland U21 ===
On 4 July 2022, he was announced as the new manager of the Poland under-21 national team, taking over after Maciej Stolarczyk. During his tenure, U21s recorded five wins, three draws and two losses in ten games.

=== Poland ===
Following the under-21 side's good start to their 2025 UEFA Euro qualifying campaign, and the dismissal of Fernando Santos from his role of managing the senior national team, Probierz was revealed as Santos' successor on 20 September 2023.

On 26 March 2024, Poland secured the last qualifying spot for the UEFA Euro 2024 campaign under the lead of Probierz after defeating Wales 5–4 on penalties after a goalless draw during the UEFA Euro 2024 qualification play-off final. Poland were eliminated from the tournament after the group stage, finishing last in their group after defeats to Netherlands and Austria and a 1–1 draw with France in their last game.

On 12 June 2025, following a public falling out with Robert Lewandowski after stripping him of captaincy, and a 1–2 2026 FIFA World Cup qualification loss to Finland two days prior, Probierz resigned from his role.

== Managerial statistics ==
As of 10 June 2025

Managerial record by team and tenure
Team	Nation	From	To	Record					Ref
Team	Nation	From	To	G	W	D	L	Win %	Ref
Polonia Bytom	(Poland)	6 October 2005	15 June 2006	24	8	6	10	33.33	
Widzew Łódź	(Poland)	15 June 2006	3 September 2007	38	8	10	20	21.05	
Polonia Bytom	(Poland)	17 December 2007	21 May 2008	13	3	5	5	23.08	
Jagiellonia Białystok	(Poland)	5 July 2008	22 July 2011	114	46	31	37	40.35	
ŁKS Łódź	(Poland)	5 September 2011	3 November 2011	8	4	1	3	50.00	
Aris	(Greece)	3 November 2011	5 January 2012	9	4	1	4	44.44	
Wisła Kraków	(Poland)	1 March 2012	1 October 2012	23	11	4	8	47.83	
GKS Bełchatów	(Poland)	14 November 2012	21 December 2012	4	0	2	2	0.00	
Lechia Gdańsk	(Poland)	4 June 2013	26 March 2014	31	10	11	10	32.26	
Jagiellonia Białystok	(Poland)	7 April 2014	4 June 2017	131	60	28	43	45.80	
Cracovia	(Poland)	21 June 2017	9 November 2021	175	68	46	61	38.86	
Bruk-Bet Termalica	(Poland)	6 January 2022	8 January 2022	0	0	0	0	—	
Poland U21	(Poland)	4 July 2022	20 September 2023	10	5	3	2	50.00	
Poland	(Poland)	20 September 2023	12 June 2025	21	9	5	7	42.86	
Total				601	236	153	212	39.27	—

== Honours ==
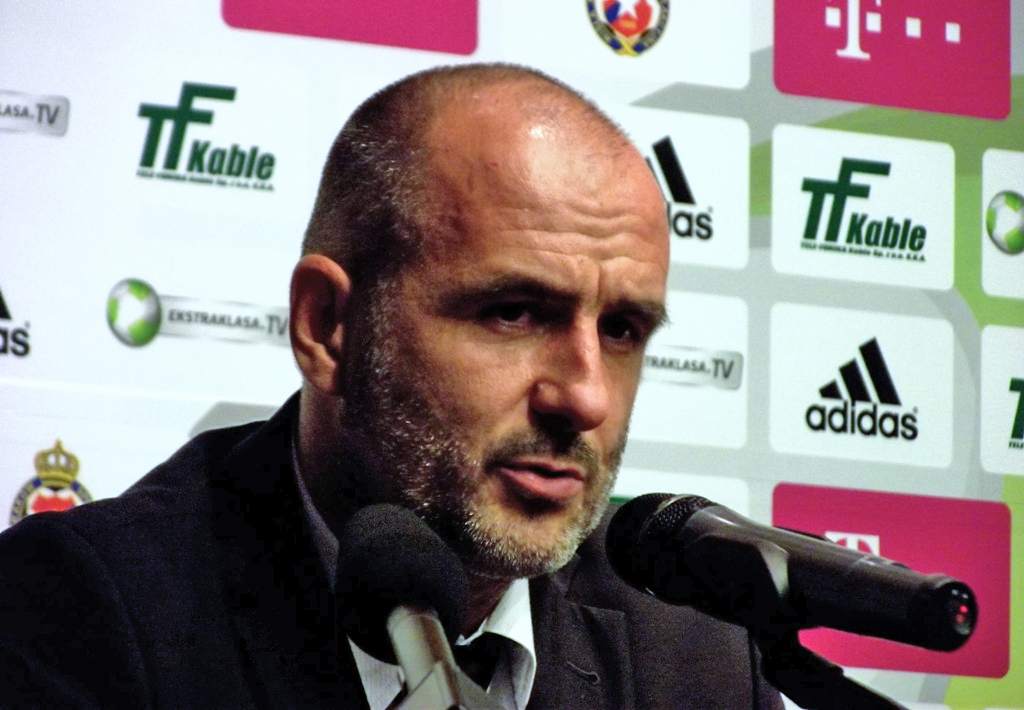
Probierz during a press conference in 2012 as the manager of Wisła Kraków

=== Manager ===
Jagiellonia Białystok

- Polish Cup: 2009–10
- Polish Super Cup: 2010

Cracovia

- Polish Cup: 2019–20
- Polish Super Cup: 2020

Individual

- Polish Coach of the Year: 2010
- Ekstraklasa Coach of the Season: 2014–15
- Ekstraklasa Coach of the Month: April 2017, December 2018, February 2019
- Jagiellonia Białystok all-time best coach: 2010
