= Lukáš Hroššo =

Slovak footballer

Personal information
- Full name: Lukáš Hroššo
- Date of birth: 19 April 1987 (age 39)
- Place of birth: Nitra, Czechoslovakia
- Height: 1.96 m (6 ft 5 in)
- Position: Goalkeeper

Team information
- Current team: Banská Bystrica
- Number: 31

Youth career
- Nitra

Senior career*
| Years | Team | Apps | (Gls) |
| 2006–2013 | Nitra | 127 | (0) |
| 2011 | → Slovan Bratislava (loan) | 8 | (0) |
| 2013–2015 | Slovan Liberec | 20 | (0) |
| 2016 | Dukla Prague | 9 | (0) |
| 2017–2018 | Nitra | 65 | (0) |
| 2019 | Zagłębie Sosnowiec | 12 | (0) |
| 2019–2024 | Cracovia | 39 | (0) |
| 2019–2023 | Cracovia II | 7 | (0) |
| 2024–2025 | Skalica | 0 | (0) |
| 2025– | Banská Bystrica | 13 | (0) |

International career
| 2008 | Slovakia U21 | 2 | (0) |
- * Club domestic league appearances and goals as of 21 September 2026

Lukáš Hroššo (born 19 April 1987) is a Slovak professional footballer who plays as a goalkeeper for Slovak First Football League club Banská Bystrica.

== Honours ==
Slovan Liberec

- Czech Cup: 2014-15

Cracovia

- Polish Cup: 2019–20
- Polish Super Cup: 2020

Cracovia II

- IV liga Lesser Poland West: 2019–20
