= Marcos Álvarez =

German footballer

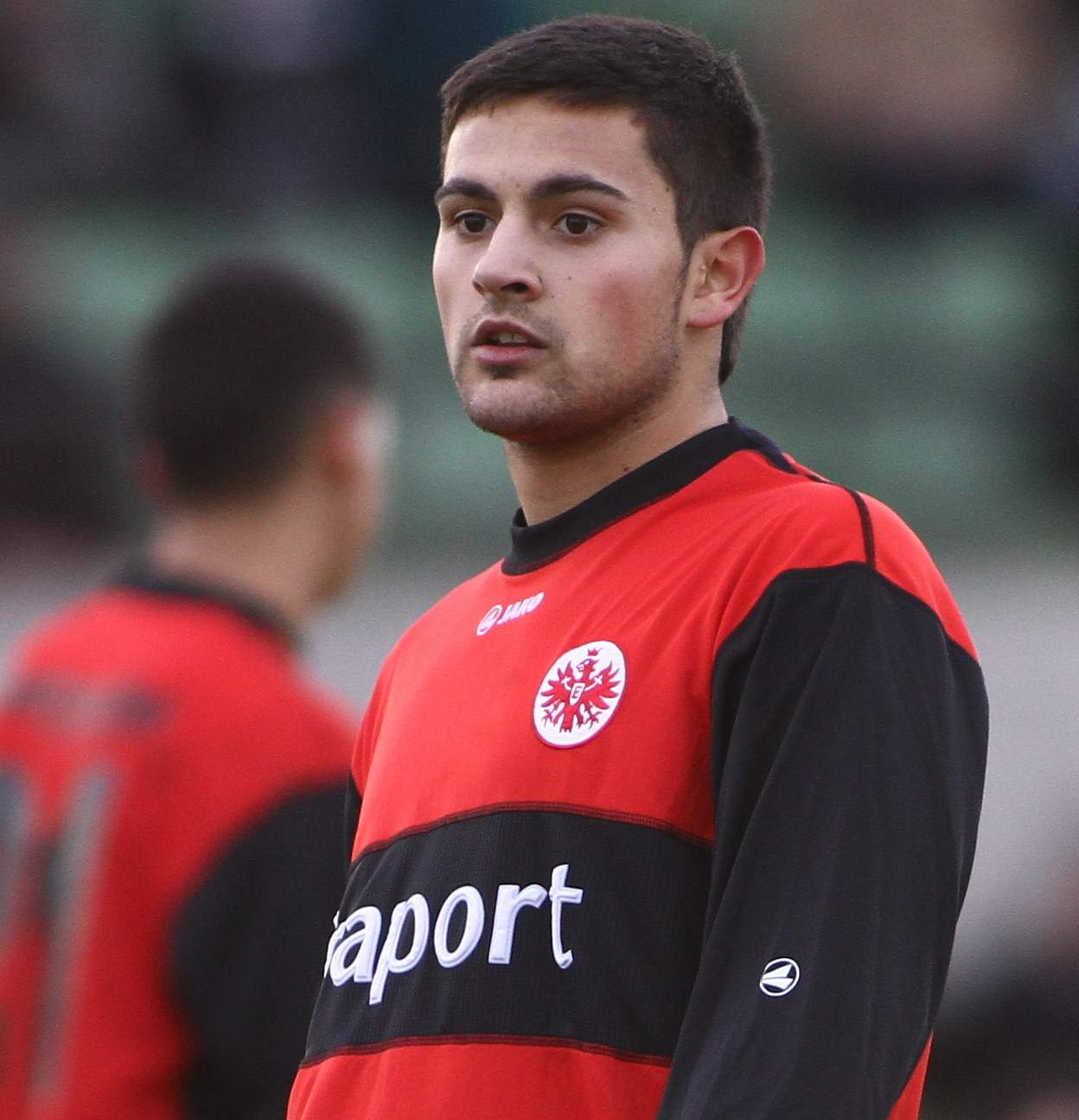
- Álvarez playing for Eintracht Frankfurt

Personal information
- Date of birth: 30 September 1991 (age 35)
- Place of birth: Gelnhausen, Germany
- Height: 1.78 m (5 ft 10 in)
- Position: Striker

Team information
- Current team: TuS Bersenbrück
- Number: 9

Youth career
- 1995–2002: FSV 08 Neuberg
- 2002–2005: TSV Hanau
- 2005–2007: Kickers Offenbach
- 2007–2009: Eintracht Frankfurt

Senior career*
Years	Team	Apps	(Gls)
2009–2011	Eintracht Frankfurt II	17	(10)
2009–2011	Eintracht Frankfurt	1	(0)
2011	Bayern Munich II	11	(0)
2011–2012	Eintracht Frankfurt II	24	(7)
2012–2014	Stuttgarter Kickers	32	(4)
2014–2016	VfL Osnabrück	61	(13)
2017	Dynamo Dresden	5	(0)
2017–2020	VfL Osnabrück	97	(32)
2020–2022	Cracovia	31	(3)
2022	Cracovia II	3	(1)
2023	SV Meppen	9	(1)
2023–2024	Kickers Offenbach	29	(8)
2024–	TuS Bersenbrück	8	(3)

International career
2006–2007	Germany U16	3	(1)
2008	Germany U17	4	(1)
2009–2010	Germany U19	5	(1)
2010–2011	Germany U20	6	(0)
- * Club domestic league appearances and goals as of 11:21, 30 September 2024 (UTC)

Marcos Alvarez (born 30 September 1991) is a German professional footballer who plays as a striker for TuS Bersenbrück.

== Career ==
After VfL Osnabrück's match against Holstein Kiel on June 21, 2020 (4-1), in which VfL secured their place in the second division, Álvarez married his girlfriend Helena at the Bremer Brücke stadium.

Alvarez joined 3. Liga club SV Meppen on 1 February 2023, after training with the club for a week. He signed a contract until summer 2024.

== Honours ==
Cracovia

- Polish Super Cup: 2020
