= Nadnarwianka Pułtusk =

Polish football club

- Full name: Ludowy Klub Sportowy; Nadnarwianka Pułtusk
- Founded: 1921; 105 years ago
- Ground: Municipal Stadium
- Capacity: 1,500
- Chairman: Michał Sępławski
- Manager: Damian Milewski
- League: IV liga Masovia
- 2025–26: V liga Masovia I, 2nd of 16 (promoted)
- Website: https://www.nadnarwianka.pl
Home colours	Away colours

Nadnarwianka Pułtusk is a Polish football club based in Pułtusk. They currently compete in the IV liga Masovia.

From 2006 to 2010, the club played in the fourth division.
