= Matej Rodin =

Croatian footballer (born 1996)

Personal information
- Date of birth: 13 February 1996 (age 30)
- Place of birth: Metković, Croatia
- Height: 1.94 m (6 ft 4 in)
- Position: Centre-back

Youth career
- –2014: GOŠK Gabela

Senior career*
Years	Team	Apps	(Gls)
2013–2016	GOŠK Gabela	42	(4)
2016–2017	Lokomotiva	0	(0)
2016–2017	→ Šibenik (loan)	26	(1)
2017	→ Aluminij (loan)	2	(0)
2017–2018	GOŠK Gabela	14	(2)
2018	Zrinjski Mostar	0	(0)
2018–2019	Željezničar	24	(3)
2019–2020	Perugia	0	(0)
2020	Varaždin	15	(0)
2020–2023	Cracovia	69	(3)
2023–2024	Oostende	18	(1)
2024–2025	Raków Częstochowa	29	(1)
2025–2026	Lechia Gdańsk	26	(1)
- * Club domestic league appearances and goals as of 08:07, 26 May 2026 (UTC)

Matej Rodin (born 13 February 1996) is a Croatian professional footballer who plays as a centre-back.

== Club career ==
On 19 June 2019, he moved to Italian Serie B club Perugia. He did not make any official game appearances for Perugia, and on 17 February 2020 he was sold to Croatian club Varaždin.

On 11 September 2020, he joined the oldest existing Polish football club Cracovia.

On 2 January 2023, Rodin signed with Oostende in Belgium until 2026. Just over a year later, on 16 January 2024, he returned to Poland to sign a one-and-a-half-year deal with defending Ekstraklasa champions Raków Częstochowa, with an option to extend for another 18 months. Rodin was released by Raków at the end of his contract in June 2025.

On 5 September 2025, Rodin moved to another Ekstraklasa club Lechia Gdańsk on a one-year contract.

== Honours ==
Cracovia

- Polish Super Cup: 2020
