= Radosław Kanach =

Polish footballer (born 1999)

Personal information
- Date of birth: 3 April 1999 (age 27)
- Place of birth: Rzeszów, Poland
- Height: 1.81 m (5 ft 11 1/2 in)
- Position: Midfielder

Team information
- Current team: Zawisza Bydgoszcz
- Number: 6

Youth career
- 2005–2013: Błażowianka Błażowa
- 2013–2016: Stal Rzeszów
- 2016–2017: Cracovia

Senior career*
Years	Team	Apps	(Gls)
2015–2016	Stal Rzeszów	33	(0)
2016–2022	Cracovia II	53	(6)
2017–2022	Cracovia	9	(0)
2018–2019	→ Sandecja Nowy Sącz (loan)	18	(0)
2019–2020	→ Sandecja Nowy Sącz (loan)	32	(2)
2023–2025	Resovia	65	(7)
2025–2026	Puszcza Niepołomice	10	(1)
2026	Podbeskidzie Bielsko-Biała	15	(0)
2026–	Zawisza Bydgoszcz	0	(0)

International career
2013	Poland U15		
2016–2017	Poland U18	4	(0)
2017–2018	Poland U19	12	(1)
2018–2019	Poland U20	4	(0)
- * Club domestic league appearances and goals as of 14:46, 6 June 2026 (UTC)

Radosław Kanach (born 3 April 1999) is a Polish professional footballer who plays as a midfielder for II liga club Zawisza Bydgoszcz.

== Club career ==
Kanach started his career with III liga side Stal Rzeszów, where he made 33 appearances over two seasons. He signed for Ekstraklasa side Cracovia in June 2016. His first involvement with the first team was in a mid-season training camp in Spain; where he played in matches against Chinese side Yanbian Funde and Moldovan side Dacia Chișinău. He made his league debut in a 4–1 loss to Wisła Płock, picking up a yellow card in the 9th minute.

== International career ==
In 2013, while a player with Stal Rzeszów, Kanach was called up to the Polish under-15 side. In October 2016, he was called up to the under-18 side, and played in two matches against Finland.

== Career statistics ==
As of match played 6 June 2026

Appearances and goals by club, season and competition
Club	Season	League			Polish Cup		Europe		Other		Total	
Club	Season	Division	Apps	Goals	Apps	Goals	Apps	Goals	Apps	Goals	Apps	Goals
Stal Rzeszów	2014–15	III liga, gr. H	1	0	—		—		—		1	0
Stal Rzeszów	2015–16	III liga, gr. H	32	0	—		—		—		32	0
Stal Rzeszów	Total		33	0	—		—		—		33	0
Cracovia II	2016–17	IV liga Les. Pol.	12	0	—		—		—		12	0
Cracovia II	2021–22	III liga, gr. IV	29	5	—		—		—		29	5
Cracovia II	2022–23	III liga, gr. IV	13	1	—		—		—		13	1
Cracovia II	Total		53	6	—		—		—		53	6
Cracovia	2016–17	Ekstraklasa	5	0	0	0	—		—		5	0
Cracovia	2017–18	Ekstraklasa	1	0	1	0	—		—		2	0
Cracovia	2018–19	Ekstraklasa	1	0	0	0	—		—		1	0
Cracovia	2020–21	Ekstraklasa	0	0	1	0	—		—		1	0
Cracovia	2021–22	Ekstraklasa	2	0	0	0	—		—		2	0
Cracovia	Total		9	0	2	0	—		0	0	11	0
Sandecja Nowy Sącz (loan)	2018–19	I liga	18	0	1	0	—		—		19	0
Sandecja Nowy Sącz (loan)	2019–20	I liga	32	2	2	0	—		—		34	2
Resovia	2022–23	I liga	12	0	—		—		—		12	0
Resovia	2023–24	I liga	29	4	1	0	—		—		30	4
Resovia	2024–25	II liga	24	3	2	0	—		—		26	3
Resovia	Total		65	7	3	0	—		—		68	7
Puszcza Niepołomice	2025–26	I liga	10	1	2	0	—		—		12	1
Podbeskidzie Bielsko-Biała	2025–26	II liga	14	0	—		—		1 (Note: Appearance in II liga promotion play-offs)	0	15	0
Zawisza Bydgoszcz	2026–27	II liga	0	0	—		—		—		0	0
Career total			234	16	10	0	0	0	1	0	245	16

== Honours ==
Stal Rzeszów

- III liga Lublin–Subcarpathia: 2014–15
- Polish Cup (Rzeszów-Dębica regionals): 2015–16
