= Sebastian Strózik =

Polish footballer (born 1999)

Personal information
- Date of birth: 15 May 1999 (age 27)
- Place of birth: Opole, Poland
- Height: 1.85 m (6 ft 1 in)
- Position: Forward

Team information
- Current team: Chrobry Głogów
- Number: 11

Youth career
- TOR Dobrzeń Wielki
- 2012–2016: Pomologia Prószków
- 2016–2017: Cracovia

Senior career*
Years	Team	Apps	(Gls)
2017–2023	Cracovia	40	(1)
2021–2022	→ Resovia (loan)	28	(1)
2023–2025	Wisła Płock	5	(0)
2024–2025	→ Stal Stalowa Wola (loan)	49	(8)
2025–	Chrobry Głogów	35	(1)

International career
2018	Poland U19	3	(1)
2018–2019	Poland U20	8	(0)
- * Club domestic league appearances and goals as of 20:59, 31 May 2026 (UTC)

Sebastian Strózik (born 15 May 1999) is a Polish professional footballer who plays as a forward for I liga club Chrobry Głogów.

== Honours ==
Cracovia II

- IV liga Lesser Poland West: 2019–20

Cracovia

- Polish Cup: 2019–20

Wisła Płock II

- Polish Cup (Płock regionals): 2023–24
