= Thiago (footballer, born 1997) =

Brazilian footballer

Personal information
- Full name: Thiago Rodrigues de Souza
- Date of birth: 18 March 1997 (age 29)
- Place of birth: Campo Grande, Brazil
- Height: 1.77 m (5 ft 10 in)
- Position: Midfielder

Team information
- Current team: Wiślanie Skawina

Senior career*
Years	Team	Apps	(Gls)
2018–2019	Red Bull Brasil	2	(0)
2019	Operário	5	(0)
2019–2020	Sandecja Nowy Sącz	19	(2)
2020–2023	Cracovia	39	(2)
2022	Cracovia II	16	(2)
2023	→ Puszcza Niepołomice (loan)	4	(0)
2024	Puszcza Niepołomice	7	(0)
2025	Stal Stalowa Wola	15	(0)
2025–2026	Cracovia II	28	(1)
2026–	Wiślanie Skawina	0	(0)
- * Club domestic league appearances and goals as of 10:44, 2 June 2026 (UTC)

Thiago Rodrigues de Souza (born 18 March 1997), known as just Thiago, is a Brazilian professional footballer who plays as a midfielder for III liga club Wiślanie Skawina.

== Honours ==
Cracovia

- Polish Cup: 2019–20
