= Sylwester Lusiusz =

Polish footballer

Personal information
- Full name: Sylwester Lusiusz
- Date of birth: 18 September 1999 (age 27)
- Place of birth: Brzozów, Poland
- Height: 1.80 m (5 ft 11 in)
- Position: Midfielder

Team information
- Current team: Sparta Katowice
- Number: 14

Youth career
- Iskra Przysietnica
- 2013–2015: Karpaty Krosno
- 2015–2017: Cracovia

Senior career*
Years	Team	Apps	(Gls)
2017–2024	Cracovia	60	(0)
2022–2023	→ Sandecja Nowy Sącz (loan)	15	(1)
2024	Podbeskidzie	8	(0)
2024–2025	Cracovia II	22	(6)
2025–2026	Sparta Kazimierza Wielka	16	(1)
2026–	Sparta Katowice	12	(1)

International career
2017	Poland U19	2	(0)
2019	Poland U20	2	(0)
2019	Poland U21	2	(0)
- * Club domestic league appearances and goals as of 17:12, 4 June 2026 (UTC)

Sylwester Lusiusz (born 18 September 1999) is a Polish professional footballer who plays as a midfielder for III liga club Sparta Katowice.

== Honours ==
Cracovia

- Polish Cup: 2019–20

Cracovia II

- IV liga Lesser Poland: 2024–25
