= Patryk Zaucha =

Polish footballer (born 2000)

Personal information
- Full name: Patryk Zaucha
- Date of birth: 19 April 2000 (age 26)
- Place of birth: Tarnów, Poland
- Height: 1.74 m (5 ft 9 in)
- Position: Left-back

Team information
- Current team: Stal Stalowa Wola
- Number: 11

Youth career
- 2012–2015: Wolania Wola Rzędzińska
- 2015–2018: Cracovia

Senior career*
Years	Team	Apps	(Gls)
2019–2023	Cracovia II	84	(17)
2019–2024	Cracovia	16	(0)
2024–	Stal Stalowa Wola	75	(7)

International career
2015–2016	Poland U16	5	(2)
2016	Poland U17	5	(0)
- * Club domestic league appearances and goals as of 11:18, 31 May 2026 (UTC)

Patryk Zaucha (born 19 April 2000) is a Polish professional footballer who plays as a left-back for II liga club Stal Stalowa Wola.

== Club career ==
Between 2018 and 2024, he was a player for Ekstraklasa side Cracovia.

He also began the 2023–24 season with the team, making three appearances in the Ekstraklasa and one in the Polish Cup. During this campaign, on 14 February 2024, he joined the third–tier club Stal Stalowa Wola. He debuted for them nine days later, playing the entire match and winning 1–0 against ŁKS Łódź II. He concluded the season in the Subcarpathian region with 11 league matches and one goal (scored on 10 May 2024 against Skra Częstochowa). Additionally, he participated in two playoff matches for promotion to the I liga, which culminated in the team's promotion to the I liga after defeating KKS 1925 Kalisz 2–1 on 1 June 2024.

== Honours ==
Cracovia II

- IV liga Lesser Poland West: 2019–20
