= 2025–26 KS Cracovia season =

Polish football club's 2025–2026 season

KS Cracovia
2025–26 season
- Manager: Luka Elsner (until 20 April); Bartosz Grzelak (from 20 April)
- Stadium: Józef Piłsudski Cracovia Stadium
- Ekstraklasa: 12th
- Polish Cup: Round of 32
- Top goalscorer: League: Ajdin Hasić; Filip Stojilković (7); All: Ajdin Hasić; Filip Stojilković (7)
- Biggest win: Lech Poznań 1–4 Cracovia
- Biggest defeat: Jagiellonia Białystok 5–2 Cracovia
colours	colours	colours

The 2025–26 season is the 117th in the history of Klub Sportowy Cracovia and the club's 13th consecutive season in the Polish football league Ekstraklasa. In addition to the domestic league, the club is also competing in the Polish Cup.

== Squad ==
=== Transfers In ===
Pos.	Player	Transferred from	Fee	Date	Source
MF	(North Macedonia) Jani Atanasov	(Poland) Puszcza Niepołomice	Loan return	30 June 2025	
MF	(Poland) Karol Knap	(Poland) Stal Mielec	Loan return	30 June 2025	
DF	(Poland) Damian Urban	(Poland) Stal Stalowa Wola	Loan return	30 June 2025	
MF	(Poland) Michał Rakoczy	(Turkey) MKE Ankaragücü	Loan return	30 June 2025	
DF	(Poland) Dominik Piła	(Poland) Lechia Gdańsk	Free	1 July 2025	
FW	(Switzerland) Filip Stojilković	(Germany) Darmstadt 98	Undisclosed	1 July 2025	
MF	(Poland) Mateusz Praszelik	(Italy) Hellas Verona	Undisclosed	9 July 2025	
GK	(Poland) Konrad Cymerys	(Poland) Siarka Tarnobrzeg	Undisclosed	11 July 2025	
MF	(Austria) Dijon Kameri	(Austria) Red Bull Salzburg	Undisclosed	21 July 2025	
FW	(United States) Kahveh Zahiroleslam	(Belgium) Sint-Truiden	Free	31 July 2025	
MF	(Poland) Mateusz Klich	(United States) Atlanta United	Free	13 August 2025	
DF	(Croatia) Boško Šutalo	(Belgium) Standard Liège	Loan	21 August 2025	
DF	(France) Brahim Traoré	(France) Caen	€500,000	31 August 2025	
MF	(Serbia) Milan Aleksić	(England) Sunderland	Loan	5 September 2025	
FW	(Republic of the Congo) Gabriel Charpentier	(Italy) Parma	Free	8 September 2025	
MF	(Poland) Mateusz Skoczylas	(Italy) Milan Futuro	Undisclosed	8 September 2025	

=== Transfers Out ===
Pos.	Player	Transferred to	Fee	Date	Source
DF	(Romania) Virgil Ghiță	(Germany) Hannover 96	€1,000,000	1 July 2025	
MF	(Poland) Maciej Mrozik	(Poland) KSZO Ostrowiec Świętokrzyski	Free	1 July 2025	
DF	(Finland) Arttu Hoskonen	(England) Stockport	End of contract	1 July 2025	
MF	(Poland) Filip Rózga	(Austria) Sturm Graz	€2,000,000	1 July 2025	
FW	(Finland) Benjamin Källman	(Germany) Hannover 96	End of contract	1 July 2025	
MF	(Poland) Patryk Sokołowski	(Poland) Śląsk Wrocław	Free	7 July 2025	
FW	(Netherlands) Mick van Buren	(Czech Republic) Hradec Králové	Undisclosed	9 July 2025	
FW	(Poland) Kacper Śmiglewski	(Poland) Puszcza Niepołomice	Loan	12 July 2025	
DF	(Poland) Damian Urban	(Poland) Chełmianka Chełm	Free	15 July 2025	
MF	(North Macedonia) Jani Atanasov	(Greece) AEL Larissa	Undisclosed	29 July 2025	
DF	(Denmark) Andreas Skovgaard	(Norway) Bryne FK	Contract terminated	28 August 2025	
DF	(Poland) Patryk Janasik	(Poland) Polonia Warsaw	Contract terminated	4 September 2025	
MF	(Poland) Fabian Bzdyl	(Slovakia) MŠK Žilina	Undisclosed	5 September 2025	
FW	(Switzerland) Filip Stojilković	(Italy) Pisa	€3,000,000	30 January 2026	

== Friendlies ==
21 June 2025	Cracovia	1–1	Opava
15:00

28 June 2025	Cracovia	3–1	Dukla Banska Bystrica
11:00

1 July 2025	Cracovia	1–1	Hapoel Be'er Sheva
17:00

5 July 2025	Korona Kielce	1–2	Cracovia
16:00

11 July 2025	Cracovia	2–0	Železiarne Podbrezová
17:00

4 September 2025	Cracovia	0–0	Polonia Bytom
15:00

== Competitions ==
=== Overall record ===
Competition	First match	Last match	Starting round	Final position	Record							
Competition	First match	Last match	Starting round	Final position	Pld	W	D	L	GF	GA	GD	Win %
Ekstraklasa	18 July 2025	23 May 2026	Matchday 1		30	9	11	10	35	38	−3	30.00
Polish Cup	23 September 2025	29 October 2025	First round	Round of 32	2	1	0	1	5	4	+1	50.00
Total					32	10	11	11	40	42	−2	31.25

Last updated: 25 April 2026
Source: Competitions

=== Ekstraklasa ===
Pos	Team	Pld	W	D	L	GF	GA	GD	Pts
11	Korona Kielce	34	11	10	13	40	40	0	43 (Note: Tied on head-to-head points and goal difference. Overall goal difference: Korona Kielce 0, Motor Lublin –7.)
12	Motor Lublin	34	10	13	11	46	53	−7	43
13	Cracovia	34	9	15	10	39	42	−3	42 (Note: Head-to-head points: Cracovia 4, Widzew Łódź 1.)
14	Widzew Łódź	34	12	6	16	41	41	0	42
15	Piast Gliwice	34	11	8	15	42	46	−4	41

Source: ekstraklasa.org 90minut.pl
Rules for classification: 1) Points; 2) Head-to-head points; 3) Head-to-head goal difference; 4) Goal difference; 5) Goals scored; 6) Number of wins; 7) Number of away wins; 8) Lower number of points based on yellow and red cards (red card = 3 points, yellow card = 1 point, sending-off = 3 points - including 1 point for first yellow card); 9) Fairplay ranking; 10) Draw.
(Note: Head-to-head record is used only after all the matches between the teams in question have been played)

==== Results summary ====
Overall								Home						Away					
Pld	W	D	L	GF	GA	GD	Pts	W	D	L	GF	GA	GD	W	D	L	GF	GA	GD
30	9	11	10	35	38	−3	38	5	7	3	20	16	+4	4	4	7	15	22	−7

Last updated: 25 April 2026.

==== Results by round ====
Round	1	2	3	4	5	6	7	8	9
Ground	A	H	H	A	H	A	H	A	A
Result	W	W	D	L	W	D	W	P	W
Position	3	1	3	6	2	3			

Updated to match(es) played on 19 September 2025. Source:
A = Away; H = Home; W = Win; D = Draw; L = Loss; P = Postponed

==== Matches ====
18 July 2025 1	Lech Poznań	1–4	Cracovia	Poznań
20:30	Ishak 45+1' (pen.); Skrzypczak (yellow card) 78'		Stojilković 2'; Ólafsson (yellow card) 24'; Hasić 26', 52'; Minchev 60'; Atanasov (yellow card) 74'	Stadium: Poznań Stadium; Attendance: 29,123; Referee: Damian Sylwestrzak

25 July 2025 2	Cracovia	2–0	Bruk-Bet Termalica Nieciecza	Kraków
18:00	Hasić 21' (pen.); Stojilković (yellow card) 24'; Piła (yellow card) 63'; Perković 78'; Praszelik (yellow card) 90+4'		Kasperkiewicz (yellow card) 39'; Kubica (yellow card) 57'; Ambrosiewicz (yellow card) 60'; Kopacz (yellow card) 77'; Boboc (yellow card) 90+1'	Stadium: Józef Piłsudski Cracovia Stadium; Attendance: 12,780; Referee: Jarosław Przybył

3 August 2025 3	Cracovia	2–2	Lechia Gdańsk	Kraków
14:45	Henriksson (yellow card) 6'; Ólafsson (yellow card) 25'; Stojilković 36', 90+1'; Kakabadze (yellow card) 64'		Bobček 9'; Dyachuk (yellow card) 43'; Zhelizko 54'; Olsson (yellow card) 87'	Stadium: Józef Piłsudski Cracovia Stadium; Attendance: 13,388; Referee: Mateusz Piszczelok

10 August 2025 4	Jagiellonia Białystok	5–2	Cracovia	Białystok
17:30	Pietuszewski 19'; Kobayashi (yellow card) 42'; Pululu 55' (pen.); Drachal (yellow card) 64'; Romanczuk 73'; Pozo 82'; Rallis 88'		Stojilković 15', (yellow card) 90+2'; Kakabadze 20'; Maigaard (penalty missed) 44'; Wójcik (yellow card) 46'; Ólafsson (yellow card) 65'; Perković (red card) 69'	Stadium: Stadion Miejski; Attendance: 19,589; Referee: Patryk Gryckiewicz

15 August 2025 5	Cracovia	1–0	Widzew Łódź	Kraków
20:30	Kakabadze (yellow card) 21'; Al-Ammari (yellow card) 57'; Minchev 69'		Krajewski (yellow card) 55'	Stadium: Józef Piłsudski Cracovia Stadium; Referee: Marcin Kochanek

24 August 2025 6	Piast Gliwice	0–0	Cracovia	Gliwice
14:45				Stadium: Piotr Wieczorek Municipal Stadium; Referee: Wojciech Myć

31 August 2025 7	Cracovia	2–1	Legia Warsaw	Kraków
20:15	Stojilković 24', (yellow card) 89'; Kakabadze (yellow card) 26'; Perković 66', (yellow card) 88'; Maigaard (yellow card) 72'		Jędrzejczyk (yellow card) 45'; Rajović 46'; Kapustka (yellow card) 63'	Stadium: Józef Piłsudski Cracovia Stadium; Referee: Piotr Lasyk

19 September 2025 9	GKS Katowice	0–3	Cracovia	Katowice
18:00	Bosch (yellow card) 65'		Czerwiński 33' (o.g.); Henriksson 40'; Galán (yellow card) 45+2'; Stojilković 55'; Minchev (yellow card) 63'	Stadium: Arena Katowice; Referee: Szymon Marciniak

27 September 2025 10	Cracovia	1–1	Górnik Zabrze
20:15

4 October 2025 11	Arka Gdynia	2–1	Cracovia
20:15

18 October 2025 12	Cracovia	2–0	Raków Częstochowa
20:15

25 October 2025 13	Pogoń Szczecin	2–1	Cracovia
17:30

3 November 2025 14	Cracovia	0–0	Zagłębie Lubin
20:30

7 November 2025 15	Radomiak Radom	3–0	Cracovia
18:00

22 November 2025 16	Cracovia	1–2	Motor Lublin
14:45

29 November 2025 17	Korona Kielce	0–1	Cracovia
17:30

4 December 2025 8	Wisła Płock	0–0	Cracovia
17:00

7 December 2025 18	Cracovia	2–2	Lech Poznań
14:45

2 February 2026 19	Bruk-Bet Termalica Nieciecza	0–1	Cracovia
19:00

6 February 2026 20	Lechia Gdańsk	1–1	Cracovia
20:30

14 February 2026 21	Cracovia	0–0	Jagiellonia Białystok
14:45

20 February 2026 22	Widzew Łódź	0–0	Cracovia
20:30

27 February 2026 23	Cracovia	2–3	Piast Gliwice
18:00

8 March 2026 24	Legia Warsaw	1–0	Cracovia
20:15

14 March 2026 25	Cracovia	1–2	Wisła Płock
20:15

21 March 2026 26	Cracovia	1–0	GKS Katowice
14:45

4 April 2026 27	Górnik Zabrze	3–0	Cracovia
17:30

12 April 2026 28	Cracovia	2–2	Arka Gdynia
12:15

19 April 2026 29	Raków Częstochowa	4–1	Cracovia
14:45

25 April 2026 30	Cracovia	1–1	Pogoń Szczecin
20:15

=== Polish Cup ===
23 September 2025 First round	Górnik Łęczna	1–5	Cracovia	Łęczna

29 October 2025 Round of 32	Raków Częstochowa	3–0	Cracovia
20:30

== Statistics ==
=== Goalscorers ===
Position	Player	Ekstraklasa	Polish Cup	Total
FW	(Bosnia and Herzegovina) Ajdin Hasić	7	0	7
FW	(Switzerland) Filip Stojilković	7	0	7
FW	(Bulgaria) Martin Minchev	4	2	6
DF	(Croatia) Mauro Perković	4	0	4
FW	(United States) Kahveh Zahiroleslam	2	1	3
MF	(Georgia (country)) Otar Kakabadze	2	0	2
MF	(Denmark) Mikkel Maigaard	1	1	2
MF	(Poland) Mateusz Praszelik	2	0	2
FW	(Republic of the Congo) Gabriel Charpentier	1	0	1
DF	(Sweden) Gustav Henriksson	1	0	1
FW	(Spain) Pau Sans	1	0	1
MF	(Austria) Dijon Kameri	1	0	1
DF	(Poland) Dominik Piła	0	1	1
