= 2024–25 KS Cracovia season =

KS Cracovia
2024–25 season
- Manager: Dawid Kroczek
- Stadium: Józef Piłsudski Cracovia Stadium
- Ekstraklasa: 6th
- Polish Cup: First round
- Highest home attendance: 13,709 vs Legia Warsaw, Ekstraklasa, 18 May 2025
- Lowest home attendance: 7,719 vs Korona Kielce, Ekstraklasa, 14 February 2025
- Average home league attendance: 10,389
Home colours	Away colours	Third colours

The 2024–25 season was the 119th season in the history of KS Cracovia, and the club's 12th consecutive season in Ekstraklasa, in which they finished 6th. Additionally, the team participated in the Polish Cup, where they were eliminated in the first round.

== Transfers ==
=== Transfers in ===
Date	Pos.	Player	Transferred from	Fee	Ref.
1 July 2024	DF	Patryk Janasik (POL)	Śląsk Wrocław (POL)	Free	
1 July 2024	MF	Bartosz Biedrzycki (POL)	Polonia Warsaw (POL)		
14 July 2024	GK	Henrich Ravas (SVK)	New England Revolution (USA)	Undisclosed	
15 July 2024	MF	Oskar Lachowicz (POL)	Legia Warsaw U19 (POL)	Undisclosed	
15 July 2024	FW	Mick van Buren (NED)	Slavia Prague (CZE)		
17 July 2024	MF	Amir Al-Ammari (IRQ)	Halmstads BK (SWE)	Undisclosed	
1 August 2024	MF	Ajdin Hasić (BIH)	Unattached	Free	
7 February 2025	DF	Gustav Henriksson (SWE)	IF Elfsborg (SWE)	Undisclosed	

=== Loans in ===
Date	Pos.	Player	Transferred from	Duration	Ref.
1 July 2024	GK	Jakub Burek (BIH)	Wisła Płock (POL)	Until end of season	

=== Transfers out ===
Date	Pos.	Player	Transferred to	Fee	Ref.
1 July 2024	FW	Filip Balaj (SVK)	FC ViOn Zlaté Moravce (SVK)		
1 July 2024	MF	Takuto Oshima (JPN)	Universitatea Craiova (ROU)	End of contract	
1 July 2024	GK	Adam Wilk (POL)	Stal Stalowa Wola (POL)	End of contract	
1 July 2024	GK	Lukáš Hroššo (SVK)	MFK Skalica (SVK)	End of contract	
1 July 2024	DF	David Jablonský (CZE)		End of contract	
1 July 2024	MF	Cornel Râpă (ROU)	UTA Arad (ROU)	End of contract	
4 July 2024	MF	Mathias Hebo (DEN)	Lyngby (DEN)	End of contract	
11 July 2024	FW	Patryk Makuch (POL)	Raków Częstochowa (POL)	€1,000,000	
30 August 2024	DF	Paweł Jaroszyński (POL)	Salernitana (ITA)	Undisclosed	
1 January 2025	MF	Mateusz Bochnak (POL)	Miedź Legnica (POL)	Undisclosed	

=== Loans out ===
Date	Pos.	Player	Transferred to	Duration	Ref.
8 July 2024	MF	Bartłomiej Kolec (POL)	Wiślan Jaśkowice (POL)	Until end of season	
9 July 2024	MF	Maciej Mrozik (POL)	KSZO Ostrowiec (POL)	Until end of season	
4 September 2024	MF	Karol Knap (POL)	Stal Mielec (POL)	Until end of season	

== Friendlies ==
Friendly match details
Date	Time	Opponent	Venue	Result F–A	Scorers	Attendance	Ref.
29 June 2024	12:00	Polonia Bytom	Home	2–1	Bochnak 80', 83'		
3 July 2024	17:05	Radomiak Radom	Neutral	0–1			
6 July 2024	18:00	AC Omonia	Neutral	3–0	Atanasov 23' pen., Bzdyl 78', Bochnak 90'		
13 July 2024	11:00	Baník Ostrava B	Home	2–4			
13 July 2024	15:30	Sigma Olomouc	Home	0–1		0	
10 January 2025	11:00	Puszcza Niepołomice	Home	2–3	Maigaard 5', Sokołowski 90' pen.	100	
14 January 2025	11:00 UTC+3	NŠ Mura	Neutral	1–2	Bzdyl 24'		
18 January 2025	13:00 UTC+3	Napredak Kruševac	Neutral	3–2	Maigaard 16', Ólafsson 45', Källman 75'		
24 January 2025	10:30 UTC+3	Sanfrecce Hiroshima	Neutral	1–2		0	
2 February 2025	11:30	GKS Jastrzębie	Home	0–1			
15 February 2025	11:00	Bruk-Bet Termalica Nieciecza	Home	3–2	Śmiglewski 32, 83 (k), Lachowicz 69'		

== Competitions ==
=== Ekstraklasa ===
==== League table ====
Pos	Team	Pld	W	D	L	GF	GA	GD	Pts	Qualification or relegation
4	Pogoń Szczecin	34	17	7	10	59	40	+19	58	
5	Legia Warsaw	34	15	9	10	60	45	+15	54	Qualification for Europa League first qualifying round (Note: The 2024–25 Polish Cup winners (Legia Warsaw) qualify for the Europa League first qualifying round.)
6	Cracovia	34	14	9	11	58	53	+5	51	
7	Motor Lublin	34	14	7	13	48	59	−11	49 (Note: Ranked based on head-to-head points: Motor Lublin 4 pts, GKS Katowice - 1 pt.)	
8	GKS Katowice	34	14	7	13	49	47	+2	49	

Source: ekstraklasa.org 90minut.pl
Rules for classification: 1) Points; 2) Head-to-head points; 3) Head-to-head goal difference; 4) Goal difference; 5) Goals scored; 6) Number of wins; 7) Number of away wins; 8) Lower number of points based on yellow and red cards (red card = 3 points, yellow card = 1 point, sending-off = 3 points - including 1 point for first yellow card); 9) Fairplay ranking; 10) Draw.
(Note: Head-to-head record is used only after all the matches between the teams in question have been played)

==== Matches ====
Ekstraklasa match details
Date	Time	Opponent	Venue	Result F–A	Scorers	Attendance	Ref.
21 July 2024	14:45	Piast Gliwice	Home	1–1	van Buren 89'	10,698	
29 July 2024	19:00	Raków Częstochowa	Away	1–0	Maigaard 48'	5,481	
5 August 2024	19:00	Widzew Łódź	Home	1–3	Källman 4'	11,933	
10 August 2024	17:30	Korona Kielce	Away	2–0	Ghiță 37', Van Buren 59'	11,931	
17 August 2024	14:45	Jagiellonia Białystok	Away	4–2	Källman 3', 53', Jugas 30', Bochnak 90+4'	17,078	
24 August 2024	17:30	Górnik Zabrze	Home	3–2	Rózga 26', Hasić 73', Sánchez 78' o.g.	10,106	
31 August 2024	20:15	Radomiak Radom	Away	1–2	Ólafsson 62'	7,799	
14 September 2024	17:30	Pogoń Szczecin	Home	2–1	Maigaard 20', Ghiță 90'	Unknown (Note: Match was played behind closed doors for safety reasons. However supporters bypassed the stadium security and entered the ground regardless.)	
21 September 2024	12:15	Puszcza Niepołomice	Away	2–1	Ghiță 15', Kakabadze 67'	4,095	
30 September 2024	19:00	Stal Mielec	Home	1–1	Källman 86' pen.	8,873	
6 October 2024	14:45	Śląsk Wrocław	Away	4–2	Källman 21 pen., Jugas 47', van Buren 68', Hasić 76' pen.	14,482	
19 October 2024	20:15	Lech Poznań	Home	0–2		13,449	
26 October 2024	14:45	Motor Lublin	Home	6–2	Ólafsson 6', 44', 72', Källman 77', 80', Bochnak 86'	10,007	
3 November 2024	17:30	Lechia Gdańsk	Away	2–1	Källman 4' pen., 44'	10,711	
9 November 2024	14:45	GKS Katowice	Home	3–4	Maigaard 45+3', 70', Källman 90+3'	10,679	
23 November 2024	20:15	Legia Warsaw	Away	2–3	Källman 34', Maigaard 79'	25,121	
29 November 2024	18:00	Zagłębie Lubin	Home	1–1	Bzdyl 10'	9,329	
8 December 2024	12:15	Piast Gliwice	Away	0–0		4,650	
1 February 2025	17:30	Raków Częstochowa	Home	0–0		12,704	
9 February 2025	14:45	Widzew Łódź	Away	1–1	Källman 18' pen.	17,337	
14 February 2025	18:00	Korona Kielce	Home	1–1	Sokołowski 90+1'	7,719	
23 February 2025	14:45	Jagiellonia Białystok	Home	2–2	Bzdyl 73', van Buren 85'	11,482	
28 February 2025	20:30	Górnik Zabrze	Away	1–0	Janicki 58' o.g.	12,472	
8 March 2025	14:45	Radomiak Radom	Home	1–2	Maigaard 12'	11,081	
14 March 2025	20:30	Pogoń Szczecin	Away	2–5	Källman 5', 11'	19,227	
29 March 2025	14:45	Puszcza Niepołomice	Home	3–1	Kakabadze 44', Källman 45+4', Minchev 50'	11,530	
4 April 2025	18:00	Stal Mielec	Away	1–1	Källman 59'	5,184	
12 April 2025	17:30	Śląsk Wrocław	Home	2–4	Petkov 45+5' o.g., Källman 79'	12,011	
21 April 2025	20:15	Lech Poznań	Away	1–2	Kakabadze 70'	27,708	
26 April 2025	17:30	Motor Lublin	Away	1–0	Perković 68'	14,767	
4 May 2025	14:45	Lechia Gdańsk	Home	0–2		11,303	
11 May 2025	14:45	GKS Katowice	Away	1–2	Al-Ammari 36'	13,853	
18 May 2025	14:45	Legia Warsaw	Home	3–1	Rózga 19', Källman 55', Henriksson 69'	13,709	
24 May 2025	17:30	Zagłębie Lubin	Away	2–1	Hasić 27', Perković 42'	5,441	

=== Polish Cup ===
Polish Cup match details
Round	Date	Time	Opponent	Venue	Result F–A	Scorers	Attendance	Ref.
First round	24 September 2024	13:00	Sandecja Nowy Sącz	Away	2–3 (a.e.t.)	Ghiță 81', Hasić 85'		
