= Martin Minchev =

Bulgarian footballer

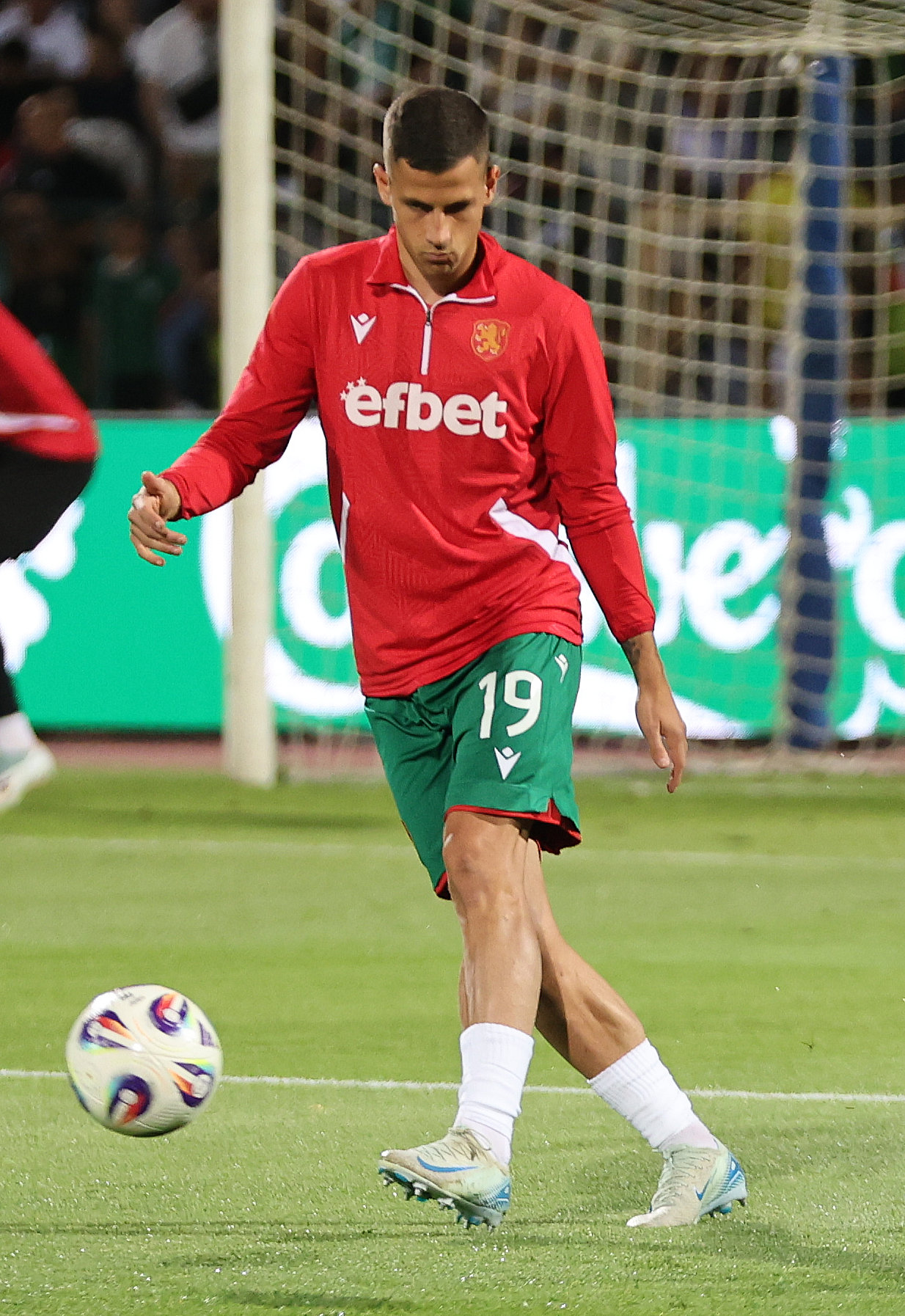
- Minchev in 2025

Personal information
- Full name: Martin Yankov Minchev
- Date of birth: 22 April 2001 (age 25)
- Place of birth: Varna, Bulgaria
- Height: 1.85 m (6 ft 1 in)
- Positions: Winger; forward

Team information
- Current team: Cracovia
- Number: 17

Youth career
- 2008–2018: Cherno More

Senior career*
Years	Team	Apps	(Gls)
2017–2020	Cherno More	78	(10)
2020–2023	Sparta Prague	70	(10)
2020–2023	Sparta Prague B	10	(7)
2023–2025	Çaykur Rizespor	38	(3)
2025–	Cracovia	53	(7)
2025	Cracovia II	2	(2)

International career^{‡}
2017	Bulgaria U17	4	(1)
2017–2018	Bulgaria U18	4	(3)
2018–2019	Bulgaria U19	4	(0)
2019–2022	Bulgaria U21	14	(2)
2019–	Bulgaria	33	(0)
- * Club domestic league appearances and goals as of 15:33, 9 November 2026 (UTC) ‡ National team caps and goals as of 22:59, 6 October 2026 (UTC)

Martin Yankov Minchev (Bulgarian: Мартин Янков Минчев; born 22 April 2001) is a Bulgarian professional footballer who plays as a winger or forward for Ekstraklasa club Cracovia and the Bulgaria national team.

== Career ==
=== Cherno More ===
Born in Varna, Minchev joined Cherno More's youth academy at the age of seven in 2008 and progressed through the age groups.

On 23 April 2017, a day after his 16th birthday, Minchev was given his professional debut by manager Georgi Ivanov in a 3–2 league victory over Lokomotiv Plovdiv, replacing Ivan Kokonov in the 76th minute. In doing so, he became Cherno More's youngest-ever first team player in the Bulgarian league, aged 16 years and one day. In the beginning of June 2017 he spent five days on trial at Serie A club Torino, where he trained with the U17 team and took part in one friendly match, scoring a hat-trick.

Minchev began to establish himself in the Cherno More first team during the 2017–18 season. On 30 March 2018, he scored his first competitive goal for the club, netting Cherno More's first in a 2–1 league victory against Pirin Blagoevgrad.

=== Sparta Prague ===
On 26 June 2020, Minchev moved abroad, signing a four-year contract with Sparta Prague.

=== Çaykur Rizespor ===
On 10 September 2023, Minchev signed a three-year contract with Turkish club Çaykur Rizespor.

=== Cracovia ===
On 19 February 2025, Minchev moved to Polish club Cracovia on a three-and-a-half-year deal for an undisclosed fee.

== International career ==
=== Youth teams ===
Minchev made his Bulgaria under-18 debut at the age of 15 in January 2017 during the 2017 Granatkin Memorial Cup. He scored his first goal in the Bulgaria's fifth game of the tournament against Slovakia on 18 January.

On 19 September 2017, Minchev made his debut for Bulgaria U17 in a friendly against Turkey U17, scoring the second consolation goal in a 2–5 home defeat.

In August 2018, Minchev took part in the Vaclav Jezek Tournament with Bulgaria U18. He scored three goals during the tournament in Vrchlabí, Czech Republic, and was named Player of the Tournament.

=== National team ===
After a good run of form with Cherno More, on 11 March 2019 Minchev was called up by manager Petar Hubchev to the Bulgaria squad for the UEFA Euro 2020 qualifying matches against Montenegro and Kosovo. He made his first senior appearance for Bulgaria in a 1–1 home draw against Montenegro on 22 March at the Vasil Levski National Stadium, coming on as a substitute for Spas Delev in the 82nd minute. Minutes later he had a great opportunity to score a winning goal, but the ball ran inches wide.

== Career statistics ==
=== Club ===
As of match played 6 November 2026

Appearances and goals by club, season and competition
Club	Season	League			National cup (Note: Includes Bulgarian Cup, Czech Cup, Turkish Cup, Polish Cup)		Continental		Total	
Club	Season	Division	Apps	Goals	Apps	Goals	Apps	Goals	Apps	Goals
Cherno More	2016–17	First League	4	0	0	0	—		4	0
Cherno More	2017–18	First League	22	2	5	0	—		27	2
Cherno More	2018–19	First League	27	2	3	1	—		30	3
Cherno More	2019–20	First League	25	6	2	1	—		27	7
Cherno More	Total		78	10	10	2	0	0	88	12
Sparta Prague	2020–21	Czech First League	14	0	3	0	4 (Note: Appearances in UEFA Europa League)	0	21	0
Sparta Prague	2021–22	Czech First League	24	4	5	1	7 (Note: One appearance in UEFA Champions League, five appearances in UEFA Europa League, one appearance in UEFA Europa Conference League)	0	36	5
Sparta Prague	2022–23	Czech First League	29	5	4	2	2 (Note: Appearances in UEFA Europa Conference League)	0	35	7
Sparta Prague	2023–24	Czech First League	3	1	0	0	3 (Note: Two appearances in UEFA Champions League, one appearance in UEFA Europa League)	0	6	1
Sparta Prague	Total		70	10	12	3	16	0	98	13
Sparta Prague B	2020–21	ČFL	1	1	—		—		1	1
Sparta Prague B	2021–22	FNL	5	5	—		—		5	5
Sparta Prague B	2022–23	FNL	4	1	—		—		4	1
Sparta Prague B	Total		10	7	0	0	0	0	10	7
Çaykur Rizespor	2023–24	Süper Lig	33	3	1	0	—		34	3
Çaykur Rizespor	2024–25	Süper Lig	5	0	2	0	—		7	0
Çaykur Rizespor	Total		38	3	3	0	—		41	3
Cracovia	2024–25	Ekstraklasa	11	1	—		—		11	1
Cracovia	2025–26	Ekstraklasa	29	4	1	2	—		30	6
Cracovia	2026–27	Ekstraklasa	13	2	1	0	—		14	2
Cracovia	Total		53	7	2	2	—		55	9
Cracovia II	2024–25	IV liga Lesser Poland	2	2	—		—		2	2
Career total			251	39	27	7	16	0	294	46

=== International ===
As of match played 6 October 2026

Appearances and goals by national team and year
National team	Year	Apps	Goals
Bulgaria	2019	3	0
Bulgaria	2020	1	0
Bulgaria	2022	7	0
Bulgaria	2023	4	0
Bulgaria	2024	7	0
Bulgaria	2025	6	0
Bulgaria	2026	5	0
Total		33	0

== Honours ==
Sparta Prague

- Czech First League: 2022–23

Cracovia II

- IV liga Lesser Poland: 2024–25
