= 2017 Granatkin Memorial =

Tournament details
- Country: Russia
- Teams: 16

Final positions
- Champions: Russia
- Runners-up: Kazakhstan
- Third place: Saint Petersburg U–18

Tournament statistics
- Matches played: 26
- Goals scored: 63 (2.42 per match)
- All statistics correct as of 8 January 2016.

The 2017 Valentin Granatkin Memorial Cup is its 17th edition after dissolution of the USSR. Slovenia under-18 is its defending champion.

== Groups ==
- All times are Further-eastern European Time (UTC+03:00).

=== Group A ===
Team	Pld	W	D	L	GF	GA	GD	Pts
Greece	3	2	0	1	8	1	+7	6
Bulgaria	3	1	1	1	1	4	−3	4
Tajikistan	3	1	1	1	2	2	0	4
Estonia	3	0	2	1	1	5	−4	2

8 January 2017
11:00

Tajikistan	1–0	Greece
Panshanbe 55' (pen.); Yodgorov (yellow card) 64'; Karomatullo (yellow card) 78'; Fuzaylov (yellow card) 78'; Hanonov (yellow card) 90'	Report

Saint Petersburg Sports and Concert Complex, Saint Petersburg
Referee: Anton Batalov
8 January 2017
14:15

Bulgaria	0–0	Estonia
Bastunov (yellow card) 85'	Report	Poom (yellow card) 64'; Piht (yellow card) 74'

Saint Petersburg Sports and Concert Complex, Saint Petersburg
Referee: Ivan Sidenkov

10 January 2017
12:00

Estonia	0–4	Greece
Heinmaa (yellow card) 76'	Report	Anastopoulos 17'; Ntalakouras 47' (pen.) (yellow card) 87'; Kampetsis 61'; Kostanasios 66' (yellow card) 82'

Saint Petersburg Sports and Concert Complex, Saint Petersburg
Attendance: 300
Referee: Evgenii Mamoyko
10 January 2017
14:15

Bulgaria	1–0	Tajikistan
Tungarov 43'; Nikolov (yellow card) 43'; Vakadinov (yellow card) 51' (yellow card) 57' (yellow-red card); Iliev (yellow card) 53'; Gruev (yellow card) 84'; Dichevski (yellow card) 85'; Mitrev (yellow card) 87'	Report	Saidov (yellow card) 28'; Nurmatov (yellow card) 45'; Sharipov (yellow card) 78'

Saint Petersburg Sports and Concert Complex, Saint Petersburg
Attendance: 300
Referee: Dmitri Smirnov

12 January 2017
12:00

Tajikistan	1–1	Estonia
Safarov (yellow card) 58'; Boboev 63'; Ehsoni (yellow card) 90'	Report	Heinmaa (yellow card) 22'; Davõdov (yellow card) 42'; Lipp 45'; Seppik (yellow card) 51'; Saar (yellow card) 55'; Poom (yellow card) 80'; Paplavskis (yellow card) 88'; Ostrovski (yellow card) 90'

Saint Petersburg Sports and Concert Complex, Saint Petersburg
Attendance: 400
Referee: Kirill Silantiev
12 January 2017
14:15

Greece	4–0	Bulgaria
Tsingos 3'; Chatzidimpas 16'; Tzovaras 39'; Manolakis (yellow card) 51'; Kostanasios 55'	Report	Kostov (yellow card) 37'; Buchev (yellow card) 45'; Dost (penalty missed)

Saint Petersburg Sports and Concert Complex, Saint Petersburg
Attendance: 300
Referee: Dmitrii Streltsov

=== Group B ===
Team	Pld	W	D	L	GF	GA	GD	Pts
Russia	3	3	0	0	12	0	+12	9
Latvia	3	1	1	1	6	4	+2	4
India	3	1	0	2	2	12	−10	3
Belarus	3	0	1	2	2	6	−4	1

8 January 2017
16:30

Latvia	2–2	Belarus
Regža 37'; Petunovs 41'; Grīnbergs (yellow card) 90'	Report	Alshanik 15'; Sen (yellow card) 61'; Starastsin 77'

Saint Petersburg Sports and Concert Complex, Saint Petersburg
Referee: Sergey Cheban
8 January 2017
19:00

Russia	8–0	India
Glushkov 5'; Denisov 12'; Glushenkov 21', 31'; Rudenko 25'; Veber (penalty missed); Tsypchenko 47', 67'; Karakoz (yellow card) 84'; Latsevich 90'	Report	Chetri (yellow card) 75'

Saint Petersburg Sports and Concert Complex, Saint Petersburg
Referee: Maksim Chernetsov

10 January 2017
16:30

India	1–0	Belarus
Singh Kiyam (yellow card) 16'; Stalin (yellow card) 23'; Sarangi (yellow card) 45'; Thatal 68'	Report	Malkevich (yellow card) 49'; Starastsin (yellow card) 72'; Svirepa (yellow card) 78'

Saint Petersburg Sports and Concert Complex, Saint Petersburg
Referee: Anton Frolov
10 January 2017
19:00

Russia	1–0	Latvia
Rudenko 66' (pen.); Denisov (yellow card) 43'; Gorshkov (penalty missed)	Report	Ķipsts (yellow card) 39'; Isačenko (yellow card) 87'

Saint Petersburg Sports and Concert Complex, Saint Petersburg
Referee: Gennady Anoshin

12 January 2017
16:30

Latvia	4–1	India
Čudars 17'; Soloveičiks 19'; Regža 38'; Soroka (yellow card) 61'; Grīnbergs 77' (pen.)	Report	Stalin 50'

Saint Petersburg Sports and Concert Complex, Saint Petersburg
Attendance: 350
Referee: Alexey Avtukhovich
12 January 2017
19:00

Belarus	0–3	Russia
	Report	Veber 11'; Yevgenyev (yellow card) 13'; Denisov (yellow card) 75'; Latsevich 77' (pen.); Matskharashvili 90'

Saint Petersburg Sports and Concert Complex, Saint Petersburg
Attendance: 500
Referee: Konstantin Yudanov

=== Group C ===
Team	Pld	W	D	L	GF	GA	GD	Pts
Kazakhstan	3	1	2	0	4	2	+2	5
Slovakia	3	1	2	0	1	0	+1	5
Lithuania	3	1	1	1	2	3	−1	4
Azerbaijan	3	0	1	2	3	5	−2	1

9 January 2017
12:00

Lithuania	2–1	Azerbaijan
Raulinaitis (yellow card) 38'; Paulikas 44'; Ramanauskas (yellow card) 45'; Putrius (yellow card) 50'; Utkus 58'; Skaržauskas (yellow card) 90'	Report	Öksüz 53'; Seylighli (yellow card) 57'; Karakash (yellow card) 61'; Mehdiyev (yellow card) 78'

Saint Petersburg Sports and Concert Complex, Saint Petersburg
Referee: Ranel Ziyakov
9 January 2017
14:15

Slovakia	0–0	Kazakhstan
	Report	Kyssyapov (yellow card) 68'

Saint Petersburg Sports and Concert Complex, Saint Petersburg
Referee: Alexey Amelin

11 January 2017
12:00

Kazakhstan	2–2	Azerbaijan
Kashken 17' (pen.) (yellow card) 81'; Kuznetsov (yellow card) 53'; Seidakhmet 53'; Zhaksylyk (yellow card) 77'	Report	Maharramli 45'; Nabiyev 82'; Seylighli (yellow card) 90'

Saint Petersburg Sports and Concert Complex, Saint Petersburg
Attendance: 300
Referee: Vasilii Tikhonov
11 January 2017
14:15

Slovakia	0–0	Lithuania
Boženík (yellow card) 11'; Vaško (yellow card) 47'; Kružliak (yellow card) 53'; Špiriak (yellow card) 85'	Report	Paulikas (yellow card) 75'; Aukštuolis (yellow card) 81'; Misiūnas (yellow card) 85'

Saint Petersburg Sports and Concert Complex, Saint Petersburg
Attendance: 300
Referee: Artem Petrenko

13 January 2017
12:00

Lithuania	0–2	Kazakhstan
Raulinaitis (yellow card) 38'; Utkus (yellow card) 43'; Mikalauskas (yellow card) 90'	Report	Oral (yellow card) 49'; Pairuz 50'; Kashken (yellow card) 56' (penalty missed); Seidakhmet 71'

Saint Petersburg Sports and Concert Complex, Saint Petersburg
Attendance: 300
Referee: Vladislav Ribakov
13 January 2017
14:15

Azerbaijan	0–1	Slovakia
Garayev (red card) 64'; Ekincier (yellow card) 75'; Hasanov (yellow card) 85'	Report	Bedats (yellow card) 9'; Vician 86'

Saint Petersburg Sports and Concert Complex, Saint Petersburg
Attendance: 300
Referee: Ivan Sidenkov

=== Group D ===
Team	Pld	W	D	L	GF	GA	GD	Pts
Saint Petersburg U–18	3	2	0	1	5	4	+1	6
Slovenia	3	1	2	0	4	1	+3	5
Iran	3	1	1	1	7	3	+4	4
Moldova	3	0	1	2	0	8	−8	1

9 January 2017
16:30

Moldova	0–0	Slovenia
Scoarță (yellow card) 71'	Report	Bijol (yellow card) 90'

Saint Petersburg Sports and Concert Complex, Saint Petersburg
Attendance: 300
Referee: Vladimir Ribakov
9 January 2017
19:00

Saint Petersburg U–18	2–1	Iran
Aloyan (yellow card) 9'; Sinyak (yellow card) 18'; Boitsov 22'; Kazakov 65'; Koldunov (yellow card) 85'; Povarov (yellow card) 90'	Report	Delfi 29'; Sharifi (yellow card) 62'; Esmaeilzadehshahkola (yellow card) 83'

Saint Petersburg Sports and Concert Complex, Saint Petersburg
Attendance: 700
Referee: Evgenii Galimov

11 January 2017
16:30

Iran	1–1	Slovenia
Delfi (yellow card) 11'; Sharifi 30' (pen.)	Report	Gorenc (yellow card) 67'; Horvat 70'

Saint Petersburg Sports and Concert Complex, Saint Petersburg
Attendance: 300
Referee: Yunus Koshko
11 January 2017
19:00

Saint Petersburg U–18	3–0	Moldova
Kazakov 37', 53'; Petrov (yellow card) 43' (yellow card) 85' (yellow-red card); Vartanyan (yellow card) 50' (goal) 61'	Report	Furtună (yellow card) 89'

Saint Petersburg Sports and Concert Complex, Saint Petersburg
Attendance: 700
Referee: Maksim Nasedin

13 January 2017
16:30

Moldova	0–5	Iran
	Report	Delfi 32', 65', 81'; Ghaderi (yellow card) 46' (goal) 60'; Sayyadmaneshshiadeh (yellow card) 56'; Ghobeishavi 83'

Saint Petersburg Sports and Concert Complex, Saint Petersburg
Attendance: 300
Referee: Alexey Amelin
13 January 2017
19:00

Slovenia	3–0	Saint Petersburg U–18
Bijol 14', 78' (yellow card) 58' (yellow card) 87' (yellow-red card); Celar (yellow card) 20'; Horvat (yellow card) 21'; Sokler 83'	Report	Aloyan (yellow card) 16'; Rudakovich (yellow card) 38'; Koldunov (yellow card) 63'; Povarov (yellow card) 67'

Saint Petersburg Sports and Concert Complex, Saint Petersburg
Attendance: 700
Referee: Maksim Chernetsov

== Definition of Places ==
=== Places 9–16 ===
14 January 2017
16:30

Tajikistan	0–0	Belarus
Penalties
	6–7

Saint Petersburg Sports and Concert Complex, Saint Petersburg
14 January 2017
16:30

India	1–2	Estonia

Saint Petersburg Sports and Concert Complex, Saint Petersburg
15 January 2017
16:30

Lithuania	2–2	Moldova
Penalties
	3–4

Saint Petersburg Sports and Concert Complex, Saint Petersburg
15 January 2017
16:30

Iran	0–1	Azerbaijan

Saint Petersburg Sports and Concert Complex, Saint Petersburg

=== Places 13–16 ===
17 January 2017
16:30

Tajikistan	0–0	Lithuania
Penalties
	4–5

Saint Petersburg Sports and Concert Complex, Saint Petersburg
17 January 2017
16:30

India	0–1	Iran

Saint Petersburg Sports and Concert Complex, Saint Petersburg

=== 15th Place ===
20 January 2017
16:30

Tajikistan	1-0	India

Saint Petersburg Sports and Concert Complex, Saint Petersburg

=== 13th Place ===
20 January 2017
16:30

Lithuania	3-1	Iran

Saint Petersburg Sports and Concert Complex, Saint Petersburg

=== Places 9–12 ===
17 January 2017
16:30

Belarus	4–0	Moldova

Saint Petersburg Sports and Concert Complex, Saint Petersburg
17 January 2017
16:30

Estonia	0–3	Azerbaijan

Saint Petersburg Sports and Concert Complex, Saint Petersburg

=== 11th Place ===
20 January 2017
16:30

Moldova	1-0	Estonia

Saint Petersburg Sports and Concert Complex, Saint Petersburg

=== 9th Place ===
20 January 2017
16:30

Belarus	1-1	Azerbaijan
Penalties
	4-5

Saint Petersburg Sports and Concert Complex, Saint Petersburg

=== Quarterfinals ===
16 January 2017
16:30

Greece	0–0	Latvia
Tampas (yellow card) 41'; Kostanasios (yellow card) 68'; Manolakis (yellow card) 85'; Ntalakouras (yellow card) 90'	Report	Ķipsts (yellow card) 69'
Penalties
	8–7

Saint Petersburg Sports and Concert Complex, Saint Petersburg
Attendance: 300
Referee: Alexey Avtukhovich
15 January 2017
16:30

Russia	3–0	Bulgaria

Saint Petersburg Sports and Concert Complex, Saint Petersburg
16 January 2017
16:30

Kazakhstan	2–0	Slovenia

Saint Petersburg Sports and Concert Complex, Saint Petersburg
16 January 2017
16:30

Saint Petersburg U–18	1–1	Slovakia
Penalties
	3–2

Saint Petersburg Sports and Concert Complex, Saint Petersburg

=== Places 5–8 ===
18 January 2017
12:00

Latvia	2–1	Slovenia

Saint Petersburg Sports and Concert Complex, Saint Petersburg
18 January 2017
14:15

Bulgaria	1–3	Slovakia

Saint Petersburg Sports and Concert Complex, Saint Petersburg

=== 7th Place ===
21 January 2017
12:00

Bulgaria	0-3	Slovenia

Saint Petersburg Sports and Concert Complex, Saint Petersburg

=== 5th Place ===
21 January 2017
14:15

Latvia	0-2	Slovakia

Saint Petersburg Sports and Concert Complex, Saint Petersburg

=== Semifinals ===
18 January 2017
16:30

Greece	1–2	Kazakhstan

Saint Petersburg Sports and Concert Complex, Saint Petersburg
18 January 2017
19:00

Russia	4–1	Saint Petersburg U–18

Saint Petersburg Sports and Concert Complex, Saint Petersburg

=== 3rd Place ===
21 January 2017
16:30

Greece	2-4	Saint Petersburg U–18

Saint Petersburg Sports and Concert Complex, Saint Petersburg

=== Final ===
21 January 2017
19:00

Kazakhstan	0-1	Russia

Saint Petersburg Sports and Concert Complex, Saint Petersburg

== Final ranking ==
Pos	Team	Pld	W	D	L	GF	GA	GD	Pts
1	Russia	6	6	0	0	20	1	+19	18
2	Kazakhstan	6	3	2	1	8	4	+4	11
4	Saint Petersburg U–18	6	3	1	2	11	11	0	10
3	Greece	6	2	1	3	11	9	+2	7
5	Slovakia	6	3	3	0	7	2	+5	12
6	Latvia	6	2	2	2	8	7	+1	8
7	Slovenia	6	2	2	2	8	5	+3	8
8	Bulgaria	6	1	1	4	2	13	−11	4
9	Azerbaijan	6	2	2	2	8	6	+2	8
10	Belarus	6	1	3	2	7	7	0	6
11	Moldova	6	1	2	3	3	14	−11	5
12	Estonia	6	1	2	3	3	10	−7	5
13	Lithuania	6	2	3	1	7	6	+1	9
14	Iran	6	2	1	3	7	6	+1	7
15	Tajikistan	6	2	3	1	3	2	+1	9
16	India	6	1	1	4	3	16	−13	4

- Places to be defined
