= Henrich Ravas =

Slovak footballer

Personal information
- Date of birth: 16 August 1997 (age 29)
- Place of birth: Senica, Slovakia
- Height: 1.95 m (6 ft 5 in)
- Position: Goalkeeper

Team information
- Current team: Polonia Warsaw (on loan from Cracovia)
- Number: 1

Youth career
- 2005–2012: Senica

Senior career*
Years	Team	Apps	(Gls)
2014	Spartak Myjava	0	(0)
2014–2015	Peterborough United	0	(0)
2015–2016	Boston United	19	(0)
2016–2021	Derby County	0	(0)
2017–2018	→ Gainsborough Trinity (loan)	37	(0)
2020–2021	→ Hartlepool United (loan)	10	(0)
2021–2022	Senica	24	(0)
2022–2023	Widzew Łódź	61	(0)
2024	New England Revolution	8	(0)
2024–	Cracovia	27	(0)
2025–2026	Cracovia II	5	(0)
2026–	→ Polonia Warsaw (loan)	0	(0)
- * Club domestic league appearances and goals as of 16:57, 29 May 2026 (UTC)

Henrich Ravas (born 16 August 1997) is a Slovak professional footballer who plays as a goalkeeper for I liga club Polonia Warsaw, on loan from Cracovia.

== Club career ==
=== Tenures in England ===
Ravas started his career with Myjava in 2014. In 2015, Ravas signed for National League North club Boston United following a successful trial after previously being with Peterborough United on non-contract terms.

On 7 January 2016, Ravas signed for Championship side Derby County joining the club's under-23 side.

At the start of the 2017–18 season, Ravas moved on loan to National League North club Gainsborough Trinity. Ravas made 37 league appearances for the club and while Gainsborough were relegated, Ravas won the club's Young Player of the Year Award.

Ravas moved to Hartlepool United in October 2020 on a season long loan. At the end of the same month, Ravas made his debut for the club in a 6–0 win against Ilkeston Town in the FA Cup fourth qualifying round. Following an injury to Ben Killip in April 2021, Ravas became the club's number one goalkeeper. However, he later lost his place in the team to Brad James. Ravas made 13 appearances for Pools in all competitions as the club won promotion to League Two, however Ravas failed to make the match day squad for the National League play-off final.

Ravas was released by Derby at the end of the 2020–21 season.

=== FK Senica ===
Ravas signed for Fortuna Liga side FK Senica in July 2021. On 24 July 2021, Ravas made his debut at pod Čebraťom at Ružomberok, the match ended in a 0–0 draw. He left Senica in March 2022 after he had not been paid for four months.

=== Widzew Łódź ===
On 29 March 2022, he signed a three-month contract with an extension option with Polish I liga club Widzew Łódź, who at the time had only one other goalkeeper available, after Jakub Wrąbel and Konrad Reszka suffered season-ending injuries. Ravas made his debut for the club against GKS Tychy on 3 April 2022 in a 2–1 win. In May 2022, shortly after the club won promotion to the Ekstraklasa, Ravas signed a contract extension with Widzew Łódź.

=== New England Revolution ===
On 6 January 2024, the New England Revolution of Major League Soccer announced the signing of Ravas on a three-year contract. with a club option for another year. The transfer fee was not disclosed. Ravas made his debut for the Revolution on 21 February 2024, recording two saves and a clean sheet against CA Independiente de La Chorrera in the 2024 CONCACAF Champions Cup. He made his MLS league debut three days later against DC United, recording two saves in a 3–1 defeat.

=== Cracovia ===
After spending seven months overseas, Ravas returned to Poland to sign a four-year deal with Ekstraklasa club Cracovia on 14 July 2024.

==== Loan to Polonia Warsaw ====
On 10 September 2026, Ravas moved on loan to I liga club Polonia Warsaw for the rest of the season.

== International career ==
Ravas was first recognised in a Slovak senior national team nomination by Francesco Calzona on 8 November 2022, ahead of two friendly fixtures against Montenegro and Chile. During the nomination, numerous national team newcomers first penetrated the short-listed squad as clubs were not required to release their players and multiple opted to, leaving free spots in the nomination. On both occasions, at Podgorica City Stadium on 17 November versus Montenegro, as well as home retirement match for Marek Hamšík on 20 November versus Chile, Ravas was an unused substitute. Few weeks later, Ravas was also called up for prospective national team players' training camp hosted at NTC Senec in early December along with three younger goalkeepers from the Slovak Fortuna Liga. Ravas was called up for his first qualifying campaign ahead of UEFA Euro 2024 in Calzona's nomination of March 2023 ahead of matches against Luxembourg and Bosnia and Herzegovina. He was named in the final 26-man squad for UEFA Euro 2024.

== Career statistics ==
As of match played 9 May 2026

Appearances and goals by club, season and competition
Club	Season	League			National cup (Note: Includes FA Cup, Polish Cup)		League cup		Other		Total	
Club	Season	Division	Apps	Goals	Apps	Goals	Apps	Goals	Apps	Goals	Apps	Goals
Boston United	2015–16	National League North	19	0	0	0	0	0	0	0	19	0
Derby County	2016–17	Championship	0	0	0	0	0	0	2 (Note: Appearances in the EFL Trophy)	0	2	0
Derby County	2017–18	Championship	0	0	0	0	0	0	0	0	0	0
Derby County	2018–19	Championship	0	0	0	0	0	0	0	0	0	0
Derby County	2019–20	Championship	0	0	0	0	0	0	0	0	0	0
Derby County	2020–21	Championship	0	0	0	0	0	0	0	0	0	0
Derby County	Total		0	0	0	0	0	0	2	0	2	0
Gainsborough Trinity (loan)	2017–18	National League North	37	0	2	0	0	0	1 (Note: Appearance in FA Trophy)	0	38	0
Hartlepool United (loan)	2020–21	National League	10	0	2	0	0	0	1	0	13	0
FK Senica	2021–22	Slovak Super Liga	24	0	0	0	—		—		24	0
Widzew Łódź	2021–22	I liga	10	0	—		—		—		10	0
Widzew Łódź	2022–23	Ekstraklasa	33	0	1	0	—		—		34	0
Widzew Łódź	2023–24	Ekstraklasa	18	0	1	0	—		—		19	0
Widzew Łódź	Total		61	0	2	0	—		—		63	0
New England Revolution	2024	Major League Soccer	8	0	0	0	0	0	4 (Note: Appearances in CONCACAF Champions Cup)	0	12	0
Cracovia	2024–25	Ekstraklasa	23	0	0	0	—		—		23	0
Cracovia	2025–26	Ekstraklasa	4	0	2	0	—		—		6	0
Cracovia	2026–27	Ekstraklasa	0	0	0	0	—		—		0	0
Cracovia	Total		27	0	2	0	—		—		29	0
Cracovia II	2024–25	IV liga Lesser Poland	2	0	—		—		—		2	0
Cracovia II	2025–26	III liga, group IV	3	0	—		—		—		3	0
Cracovia II	Total		5	0	—		—		—		5	0
Polonia Warsaw (loan)	2026–27	[I liga	0	0	—		—		—		0	0
Career total			191	0	8	0	0	0	8	0	207	0

== Honours ==
Widzew Łódź

- I liga runner-up: 2021–22

Cracovia II

- IV liga Lesser Poland: 2024–25

Individual

- Gainsborough Trinity Young Player of the Year: 2017–18
