= Jakub Jugas =

Czech footballer

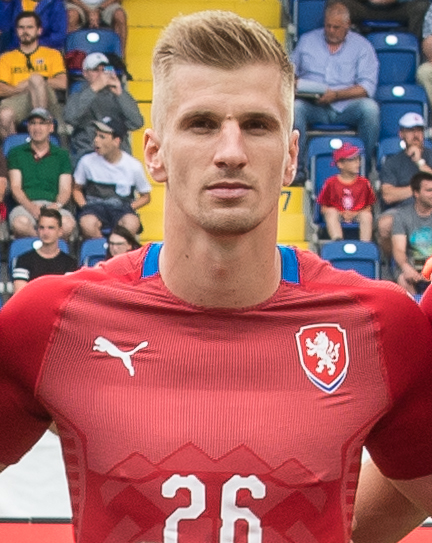
- Jugas in 2018

Personal information
- Date of birth: 5 May 1992 (age 34)
- Place of birth: Otrokovice, Czechoslovakia
- Height: 1.86 m (6 ft 1 in)
- Position: Centre-back

Team information
- Current team: Zlín
- Number: 25

Youth career
- 1998–2002: Otrokovice
- 2002–2010: Zlín

Senior career*
Years	Team	Apps	(Gls)
2010–2017	Zlín	101	(3)
2012–2014	→ Příbram (loan)	46	(1)
2014–2015	→ Brno (loan)	28	(3)
2017–2021	Slavia Prague	28	(1)
2019	→ Mladá Boleslav (loan)	13	(0)
2019–2020	→ Jablonec (loan)	16	(0)
2020–2021	→ Slovan Liberec (loan)	23	(0)
2021–2025	Cracovia	81	(3)
2025	Cracovia II	2	(0)
2026–	Zlín	8	(0)

International career
2008	Czech Republic U16	3	(0)
2008–2009	Czech Republic U17	9	(0)
2010	Czech Republic U18	5	(0)
2010–2011	Czech Republic U19	16	(1)
2012–2015	Czech Republic U21	10	(0)
2018–2023	Czech Republic	3	(0)
Medal record
Men's football
Representing Czech Republic
UEFA Euro U-19
Runner-up	2011 Romania
- * Club domestic league appearances and goals as of 27 May 2026

Jakub Jugas (born 5 May 1992) is a Czech professional footballer who plays as a centre-back for Czech First League club Zlín.

== Club career ==
Jugas made his league debut on 28 August 2010 in Zlín's 0–2 Czech National Football League away loss against Sparta Prague B. He scored his first league goal on 17 August 2013 in the 4–0 home win against Baník Ostrava. He won the Czech FA Cup with Zlín in 2017.

=== Slavia Prague ===
In May 2017, after fierce competition for his signature, Jugas decided to join Slavia Prague for the 2017–18 Fortuna Liga season for a reported transfer fee of €570,000 plus future incentives.

On 9 May 2018, he played as Slavia Prague won the 2017–18 Czech Cup final against Jablonec.

In February 2019, he joined Mladá Boleslav on loan until the end of the season.

== International career ==
Jugas represented Czech Republic on every youth level from the Under-16 team, except Under-20. He was a part of the Czech Republic U-19 squad that won silver medals in the 2011 UEFA Under-19 European Championship in Romania. On 30 June 2017, he was called up to the senior Czech national team to face Belgium and Norway.

== Career statistics ==
=== Club ===
As of match played 25 October 2025

Appearances and goals by club, season and competition
Club	Season	League			National cup (Note: Includes Czech Cup, Polish Cup)		Continental		Other		Total	
Club	Season	Division	Apps	Goals	Apps	Goals	Apps	Goals	Apps	Goals	Apps	Goals
Zlín	2010–11	CNFL	10	0	—		—		—		10	0
Zlín	2011–12	CNFL	27	0	0	0	—		—		27	0
Zlín	2012–13	CNFL	7	0	—		—		—		7	0
Zlín	Total		44	0	0	0	—		—		44	0
Příbram (loan)	2012–13	Czech First League	23	0	0	0	—		—		23	0
Příbram (loan)	2013–14	Czech First League	23	1	2	0	—		—		25	1
Příbram (loan)	Total		46	1	2	0	—		—		48	1
Brno (loan)	2014–15	Czech First League	28	3	2	0	—		—		30	3
Zlín	2015–16	Czech First League	30	0	3	1	—		—		33	1
Zlín	2016–17	Czech First League	27	3	4	0	—		—		31	3
Zlín	Total		57	3	7	1	—		—		64	4
Slavia Prague	2017–18	Czech First League	28	1	4	0	10 (Note: Four appearances in UEFA Champions League, six appearances in UEFA Europa League)	0	—		42	1
Slavia Prague	2018–19	Czech First League	0	0	1	0	0	0	—		1	0
Slavia Prague	Total		28	1	5	0	10	0	—		43	1
Mladá Boleslav (loan)	2018–19	Czech First League	13	0	—		—		—		13	0
Jablonec (loan)	2019–20	Czech First League	16	0	2	0	2 (Note: Appearances in UEFA Europa League)	0	—		20	0
Slovan Liberec (loan)	2020–21	Czech First League	23	0	1	0	4	0	—		28	0
Cracovia	2021–22	Ekstraklasa	19	0	1	0	—		—		20	0
Cracovia	2022–23	Ekstraklasa	26	1	1	0	—		—		27	1
Cracovia	2023–24	Ekstraklasa	12	0	2	0	—		—		14	0
Cracovia	2024–25	Ekstraklasa	24	2	0	0	—		—		24	2
Cracovia	2025–26	Ekstraklasa	0	0	0	0	—		—		0	0
Cracovia	Total		81	3	4	0	—		—		85	3
Cracovia II	2025–26	III liga, group IV	2	0	—		—		—		2	0
Career total			338	11	23	1	16	0	0	0	377	12

=== International ===
As of match played 20 June 2023

Appearances and goals by national team and year
National team	Year	Apps	Goals
Czech Republic
Czech Republic	2018	2	0
Czech Republic	2023	1	0
Total		3	0

== Honours ==
Zlín

- Czech Cup: 2016–17

Slavia Prague

- Czech Cup: 2017–18

Czech Republic U19

- UEFA European Under-19 Championship runner-up: 2011
