= Amir Al-Ammari =

Iraqi footballer (born 1997)

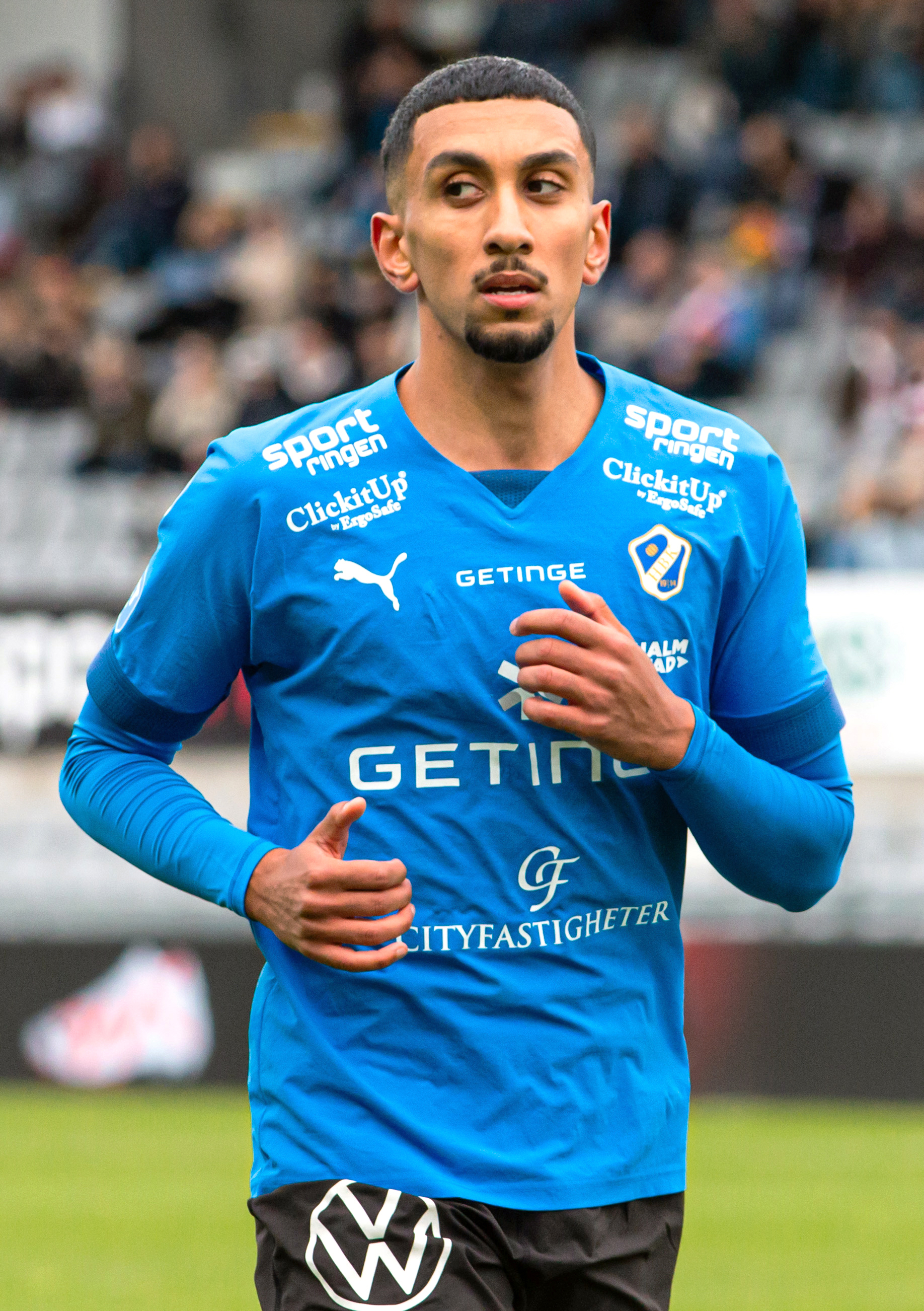
- Al-Ammari with Halmstads BK in 2023

Personal information
- Full name: Amir Fouad Abboud Al-Ammari
- Date of birth: 27 July 1997 (age 29)
- Place of birth: Jönköping, Sweden
- Height: 1.84 m (6 ft 0 in)
- Position: Midfielder

Team information
- Current team: Cracovia
- Number: 6

Youth career
- –2009: IFK Öxnehaga
- 2009–2013: Husqvarna FF
- 2013–2016: Brøndby IF

Senior career*
Years	Team	Apps	(Gls)
2017	Husqvarna FF	24	(7)
2018–2020	Jönköpings Södra IF	88	(18)
2021	Halmstads BK	29	(3)
2022–2023	IFK Göteborg	11	(0)
2022	→ Mjällby AIF (loan)	12	(1)
2023	→ Halmstads BK (loan)	16	(0)
2023–2024	Halmstads BK	26	(2)
2024–	Cracovia	77	(2)

International career^{‡}
2014–2015	Sweden U19	4	(0)
2019–2020	Iraq U23	6	(5)
2021–	Iraq	58	(3)
Medal record
Men's football
Representing Iraq
Arabian Gulf Cup
Winner	2023 Iraq
- * Club domestic league appearances and goals as of 15:32, 9 November 2026 (UTC) ‡ National team caps and goals as of 23:27, 17 November 2026 (UTC)

Amir Fouad Abboud Al-Ammari (Arabic: أمير فؤاد عبود العماري; born 27 July 1997) is a professional footballer who plays as a midfielder for Ekstraklasa club Cracovia and the Iraq national team. Born in Sweden, he represented them at youth level before switching his allegiance to Iraq.

== Club career ==
Al-Ammari started his youth career with Swedish clubs IFK Öxnehaga and Husqvarna FF, before moving to Denmark to join the youth academy of Brøndby IF.

Al-Ammari returned to Husqvarna in March 2017, where he started his senior career. On 11 December 2017, Jönköpings Södra IF announced the signing of Al-Ammari on a three-year deal. He left the club in December 2020 following the conclusion of 2020 Superettan season.

On 14 February 2021, newly promoted Allsvenskan side Halmstads BK announced the signing of Al-Ammari. He made his professional debut on 11 April 2021 in a 1–0 win against BK Häcken.

On 17 July 2024, Al-Ammari joined Polish club Cracovia on a three-year contract.

== International career ==
Born in Sweden, Al-Ammari is eligible to play for Iraq through his father. He is also of Palestinian origin on his mother's side.

=== Sweden U19 ===
He has played four friendlies for Sweden under-19 team in 2014 and 2015.

=== Iraq U23 ===
In March 2019, Al-Ammari played for Iraq under-23 team in 2020 AFC U-23 Championship qualifiers. He scored two goals from three matches and helped his team qualify for the main tournament. In January 2020, he was selected in Iraq's squad for 2020 AFC U-23 Championship.

=== Iraq ===
On 2 September 2021, Al-Ammari made his first international cap with Iraq against South Korea in the 2022 World Cup qualifiers. Later that year, on 11 November, he scored his first goal from a penalty in a 1–1 draw against Syria during the 2022 World Cup qualification.

On 18 November 2025, Al-Ammari scored a late stoppage-time penalty in a 2–1 victory over the United Arab Emirates during the 2026 World Cup qualification fifth round, securing his nation's place in the inter-confederation play-offs.

== Career statistics ==
=== Club ===
As of match played 6 November 2026

Appearances and goals by club, season and competition
Club	Season	League			National cup (Note: Includes Svenska Cupen, Polish Cup)		Continental		Other		Total	
Club	Season	Division	Apps	Goals	Apps	Goals	Apps	Goals	Apps	Goals	Apps	Goals
Husqvarna FF	2017	Ettan	24	7	2	1	—		—		26	8
Jönköpings Södra IF	2018	Superettan	28	2	3	0	—		—		31	2
Jönköpings Södra IF	2019	Superettan	30	6	4	1	—		—		34	7
Jönköpings Södra IF	2020	Superettan	30	9	4	0	—		2 (Note: Appearances in Allsvenskan relegation play-offs)	0	36	9
Jönköpings Södra IF	Total		88	17	11	2	—		2	0	101	18
Halmstads BK	2021	Allsvenskan	29	3	3	1	—		2	0	34	4
IFK Göteborg	2022	Allsvenskan	11	0	2	0	—		—		13	0
Mjällby AIF (loan)	2022	Allsvenskan	12	1	0	0	—		—		12	1
Halmstads BK (loan)	2023	Allsvenskan	29	1	3	0	—		—		32	1
Halmstads BK	2024	Allsvenskan	13	1	5	1	—		—		18	2
Cracovia	2024–25	Ekstraklasa	30	1	1	0	—		—		31	1
Cracovia	2025–26	Ekstraklasa	33	1	1	0	—		—		34	1
Cracovia	2026–27	Ekstraklasa	14	0	0	0	—		—		14	0
Cracovia	Total		77	2	2	0	—		—		79	2
Career total			283	32	28	4	0	0	4	0	315	36

=== International ===
As of match played 17 November 2026

Appearances and goals by national team and year
National team	Year	Apps	Goals
Iraq	2021	5	1
Iraq	2022	6	0
Iraq	2023	12	0
Iraq	2024	16	1
Iraq	2025	9	1
Iraq	2026	10	0
Total		58	3

Scores and results list Iraq's goal tally first, score column indicates score after each Al-Ammari goal.

List of international goals scored by Amir Al-Ammari
No.	Date	Venue	Opponent	Score	Result	Competition
1	11 November 2021	Thani bin Jassim Stadium, Doha, Qatar	Syria	1–1	1–1	2022 FIFA World Cup qualification
2	26 March 2024	Rizal Memorial Stadium, Manila, Philippines	Philippines	2–0	5–0	2026 FIFA World Cup qualification
3	18 November 2025	Basra International Stadium, Basra, Iraq	United Arab Emirates	2–1	2–1	2026 FIFA World Cup qualification

== Honours ==
Iraq

- Arabian Gulf Cup: 2023
