= Dmitri Starodub =

Russian footballer

Personal information
- Full name: Dmitri Aleksandrovich Starodub
- Date of birth: 19 May 1995 (age 31)
- Place of birth: Vladivostok, Russia
- Height: 1.81 m (5 ft 11 in)
- Position: Right-back

Team information
- Current team: FC KDV Tomsk
- Number: 11

Youth career
- 2012–2014: FC Dynamo Moscow
- 2014–2015: FC Arsenal Tula

Senior career*
Years	Team	Apps	(Gls)
2014–2017	FC Arsenal Tula	7	(0)
2015–2017	→ FC Arsenal-2 Tula	43	(4)
2017–2020	FC Veles Moscow	62	(2)
2020–2022	FC Tver	48	(1)
2022–2024	FC SKA-Khabarovsk	31	(3)
2023–2024	FC SKA-Khabarovsk-2	1	(0)
2024–2025	FC KAMAZ Naberezhnye Chelny	40	(3)
2025–	FC KDV Tomsk	40	(2)
- * Club domestic league appearances and goals as of 1 November 2026

Dmitri Aleksandrovich Starodub (Russian: Дмитрий Александрович Стародуб; born 19 May 1995) is a Russian football player who plays for FC KDV Tomsk.

== Club career ==
He made his Russian Premier League debut on 21 March 2015 for FC Arsenal Tula in a game against PFC CSKA Moscow.
