= FC KDV Tomsk =

Russian football club

KDV Tomsk
- Full name: Football Club KDV Tomsk
- Founded: 1996; 30 years ago
- Ground: Trud Stadium
- Capacity: 3,098
- Manager: Sergei Perednya
- League: Russian Second League, Division B, Group 4
- 2026: 2nd
- Website: fckdv.ru
Home colours	Away colours

FC KDV Tomsk (Russian: КДВ Томск) is a Russian football team from Tomsk that plays in the Russian Second League.

== History ==
In February 2025, Russian Second League club FC Stroitel Kamensk-Shakhtinsky was purchased by a new owner Denis Shtengelov (the founder of a food company KDV-Group), rebranded and relocated to Tomsk as FC KDV Tomsk.

== Current squad ==
As of 12 September 2026

Note: Flags indicate national team as defined under FIFA eligibility rules; some limited exceptions apply. Players may hold more than one non-FIFA nationality.

No.	Pos.	Nation	Player
1	GK	RUS	Ilya Voronov
2	DF	RUS	Aleksandr Nesterov
3	DF	UKR	Danylo Sahutkin
5	DF	RUS	Aleksandr Putsko
7	FW	RUS	Konstantin Antipov
9	FW	UKR	Danylo Kondrakov
10	MF	RUS	Oleg Leonov
11	DF	RUS	Dmitri Starodub
12	GK	RUS	Timur Smirnov
14	MF	RUS	Denis Stepanenko
15	MF	RUS	Denis Nikonorov
16	DF	RUS	Roman Denisov
17	MF	RUS	Igor Konovalov
18	MF	RUS	Anton Kilin
20	MF	RUS	Nikita Matskharashvili

No.	Pos.	Nation	Player
21	DF	RUS	Daniil Zhukov
23	FW	RUS	Dmitri Lavrishchev
24	MF	RUS	Aleksandr Korotayev
27	MF	RUS	Ivan Chudin
29	DF	RUS	Yegor Shakhov
30	GK	RUS	Danil Pshenichnikov
33	DF	RUS	Yegor Yegorov
44	FW	RUS	Arseny Lomtev
50	GK	RUS	Yegor Skichko
63	DF	RUS	Ilya Volnov
70	MF	RUS	Danil Nikiforov
88	MF	RUS	Nikita Simdyankin
97	DF	RUS	Daniil Bolshunov
99	MF	RUS	Maksim Paliyenko
