= Denis Nikonorov =

Russian footballer

Personal information
- Full name: Denis Alekseyevich Nikonorov
- Date of birth: 1 May 2004 (age 22)
- Height: 1.76 m (5 ft 9 in)
- Position: Right midfielder

Team information
- Current team: KDV Tomsk
- Number: 15

Youth career
- Pari Nizhny Novgorod

Senior career*
Years	Team	Apps	(Gls)
2023–2024	Pari Nizhny Novgorod	0	(0)
2024	Pari NN-2 Nizhny Novgorod	23	(2)
2025–	KDV Tomsk	25	(3)
- * Club domestic league appearances and goals as of 1 November 2026

Denis Alekseyevich Nikonorov (Russian: Денис Алексеевич Никоноров; born 1 May 2004) is a Russian football player who plays as a right midfielder for KDV Tomsk.

== Career ==
Nikonorov made his debut for Pari Nizhny Novgorod on 4 October 2023 in a Russian Cup game against Krasnodar.

== Career statistics ==
As of 1 June 2024

Club	Season	League			Cup		Continental		Other		Total	
Club	Season	Division	Apps	Goals	Apps	Goals	Apps	Goals	Apps	Goals	Apps	Goals
Pari Nizhny Novgorod	2023–24	Russian Premier League	0	0	1	0	–		0	0	1	0
Pari NN-2 Nizhny Novgorod	2024	Russian Second League B	7	1	–		–		–		7	1
Career total			7	1	1	0	0	0	0	0	8	1
