= Oleg Leonov (footballer) =

Russian footballer

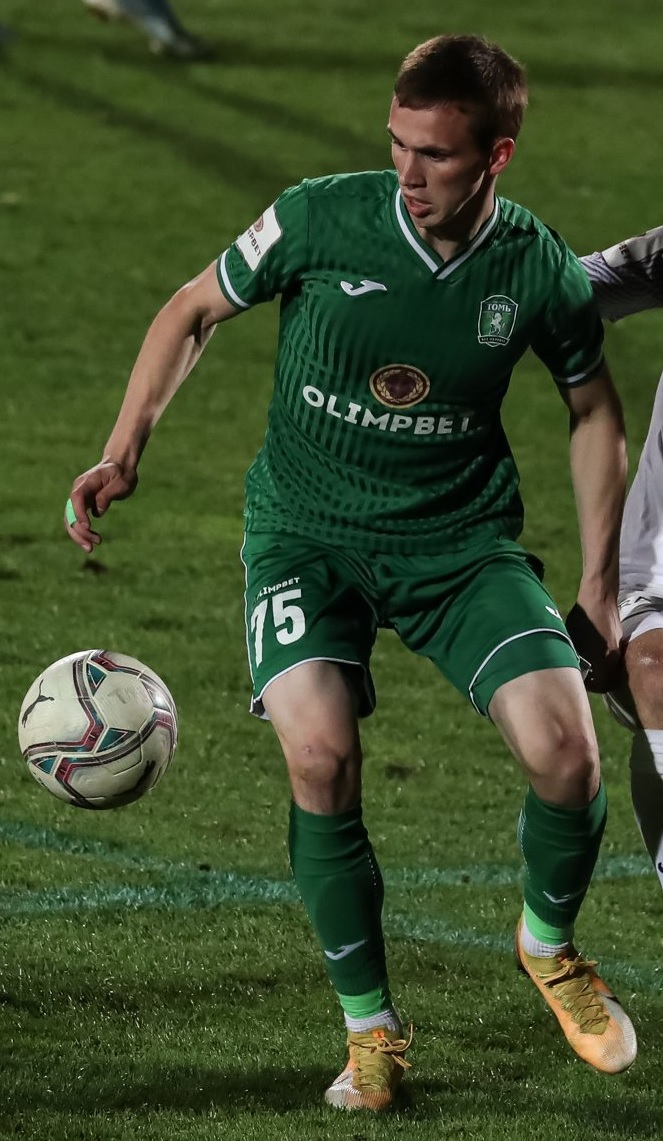
- Leonov with Tom Tomsk in 2021

Personal information
- Full name: Oleg Aleksandrovich Leonov
- Date of birth: 24 August 2001 (age 25)
- Place of birth: Tomsk, Russia
- Height: 1.75 m (5 ft 9 in)
- Position: Midfielder

Team information
- Current team: FC KDV Tomsk
- Number: 10

Youth career
- 2010–2017: FC Tom Tomsk
- 2017–2018: FC Anzhi Makhachkala
- 2019–2021: FC Tom Tomsk

Senior career*
Years	Team	Apps	(Gls)
2019–2022	FC Tom Tomsk	33	(0)
2022	→ FC Novosibirsk (loan)	9	(0)
2022–2023	FC Novosibirsk	12	(1)
2023–2024	FC Nosta Novotroitsk	31	(8)
2024	FC Dynamo Vladivostok	9	(1)
2025–	FC KDV Tomsk	28	(2)
- * Club domestic league appearances and goals as of 1 November 2026

Oleg Aleksandrovich Leonov (Russian: Олег Александрович Леонов; born 24 August 2001) is a Russian football player who plays for FC KDV Tomsk.

== Club career ==
He made his debut in the Russian Football National League for FC Tom Tomsk on 3 November 2019 in a game against FC Luch Vladivostok.
