= Mauro Perković =

Croatian footballer (born 2003)

Personal information
- Date of birth: 22 March 2003 (age 23)
- Place of birth: Pula, Croatia
- Height: 1.85 m (6 ft 1 in)
- Position: Defender

Team information
- Current team: Cracovia
- Number: 39

Youth career
- –2012: NK Pula ICI
- 2012–2020: Istra 1961

Senior career*
Years	Team	Apps	(Gls)
2020–2023	Istra 1961	48	(3)
2023	→ Dinamo Zagreb (loan)	8	(0)
2023–2025	Dinamo Zagreb	22	(2)
2025	→ Cracovia (loan)	22	(5)
2025	→ Cracovia II (loan)	4	(0)
2025–	Cracovia	18	(2)

International career
2019	Croatia U16	2	(0)
2021–2022	Croatia U19	12	(0)
2022–2024	Croatia U21	10	(0)
- * Club domestic league appearances and goals as of 17:00, 23 August 2026 (UTC)

Mauro Perković (born 22 March 2003) is a Croatian professional footballer who plays as a defender for Ekstraklasa club Cracovia.

== Club career ==
Perković made his professional debut for Istra 1961 on 27 January 2021.

On 22 February 2025, he joined Cracovia from Dinamo Zagreb on a year-long loan. On 5 December 2025, his move was made permanent, with Perković signing a three-and-a-half-year deal.

== Personal life ==
Perković is brother of professional basketball player Toni Perković.

== Career statistics ==
As of match played 23 May 2026

Appearances and goals by club, season and competition
Club	Season	League			National cup (Note: Includes Croatian Cup, Polish Cup)		Continental		Other		Total	
Club	Season	Division	Apps	Goals	Apps	Goals	Apps	Goals	Apps	Goals	Apps	Goals
Istra 1961	2020–21	Prva HNL	6	0	0	0	—		—		6	0
Istra 1961	2021–22	Prva HNL	25	3	1	0	—		—		26	3
Istra 1961	2022–23	Prva HNL	17	0	1	0	—		—		3	1
Istra 1961	Total		48	3	2	0	—		—		50	3
Dinamo Zagreb (loan)	2022–23	Prva HNL	8	0	1	0	—		—		9	0
Dinamo Zagreb	2023–24	Prva HNL	21	2	4	0	7 (Note: Appearances in UEFA Europa Conference League)	0	—		32	2
Dinamo Zagreb	2024–25	Prva HNL	1	0	0	0	0	0	—		1	0
Dinamo Zagreb	Total		30	2	5	0	7	0	—		42	2
Cracovia (loan)	2024–25	Ekstraklasa	8	2	—		—		—		8	2
Cracovia (loan)	2025–26	Ekstraklasa	14	3	1	0	—		—		15	3
Cracovia	2025–26	Ekstraklasa	13	1	—		—		—		13	1
Cracovia	Total		35	6	1	0	—		—		36	6
Cracovia II (loan)	2024–25	IV liga Lesser Poland	3	0	—		—		—		3	0
Cracovia II (loan)	2025–26	III liga, group IV	1	0	—		—		—		1	0
Cracovia II (loan)	Total		4	0	—		—		—		4	0
Career total			117	11	8	0	7	0	0	0	132	11

== Honours ==
Dinamo Zagreb

- HNL: 2022–23, 2023–24
- Croatian Cup: 2023–24

Cracovia II

- IV liga Lesser Poland: 2024–25
