= Karol Knap =

Polish footballer (born 2001)

Personal information
- Full name: Karol Knap
- Date of birth: 12 September 2001 (age 25)
- Place of birth: Krosno, Poland
- Height: 1.80 m (5 ft 11 in)
- Position: Midfielder

Team information
- Current team: Cracovia
- Number: 20

Youth career
- 2011–2018: Karpaty Krosno

Senior career*
Years	Team	Apps	(Gls)
2018–2020	Karpaty Krosno	62	(12)
2020–2021	Puszcza Niepołomice	23	(0)
2021–	Cracovia	108	(8)
2021–2022	Cracovia II	6	(0)
2024–2025	→ Stal Mielec (loan)	13	(0)

International career
2021	Poland U20	3	(0)
- * Club domestic league appearances and goals as of 21:15, 22 November 2026 (UTC)

Karol Knap (born 12 September 2001) is a Polish professional footballer who plays as a midfielder for Ekstraklasa club Cracovia.

== Career statistics ==
As of match played 16 May 2026

Appearances and goals by club, season and competition
Club	Season	League			Polish Cup		Europe		Other		Total	
Club	Season	Division	Apps	Goals	Apps	Goals	Apps	Goals	Apps	Goals	Apps	Goals
Karpaty Krosno	2018–19	IV liga Subcarpathia	32	3	—		—		—		32	3
Karpaty Krosno	2019–20	IV liga Subcarpathia	17	7	—		—		—		17	7
Karpaty Krosno	2020–21	IV liga Subcarpathia	3	2	—		—		—		3	2
Karpaty Krosno	Total		62	12	—		—		—		62	12
Puszcza Niepołomice	2020–21	I liga	23	0	2	0	—		—		25	0
Cracovia	2021–22	Ekstraklasa	23	0	1	0	—		—		24	0
Cracovia	2022–23	Ekstraklasa	30	2	1	0	—		—		31	2
Cracovia	2023–24	Ekstraklasa	29	4	3	0	—		—		32	4
Cracovia	2024–25	Ekstraklasa	1	0	0	0	—		—		1	0
Cracovia	2025–26	Ekstraklasa	16	0	2	0	—		—		18	0
Cracovia	Total		99	6	7	0	—		—		106	6
Cracovia II	2021–22	III liga, gr. IV	1	0	—		—		—		1	0
Cracovia II	2022–23	III liga, gr. IV	4	0	—		—		—		4	0
Cracovia II	2025–26	III liga, gr. IV	1	0	—		—		—		1	0
Cracovia II	Total		6	0	—		—		—		6	0
Stal Mielec (loan)	2024–25	Ekstraklasa	13	0	1	0	—		—		14	0
Career total			203	18	10	0	—		—		213	18

== Honours ==
Karpaty Krosno

- Polish Cup (Subcarpathia regionals): 2019–20
- Polish Cup (Krosno regionals): 2019–20
