= Ivan Chudin =

Russian professional football player

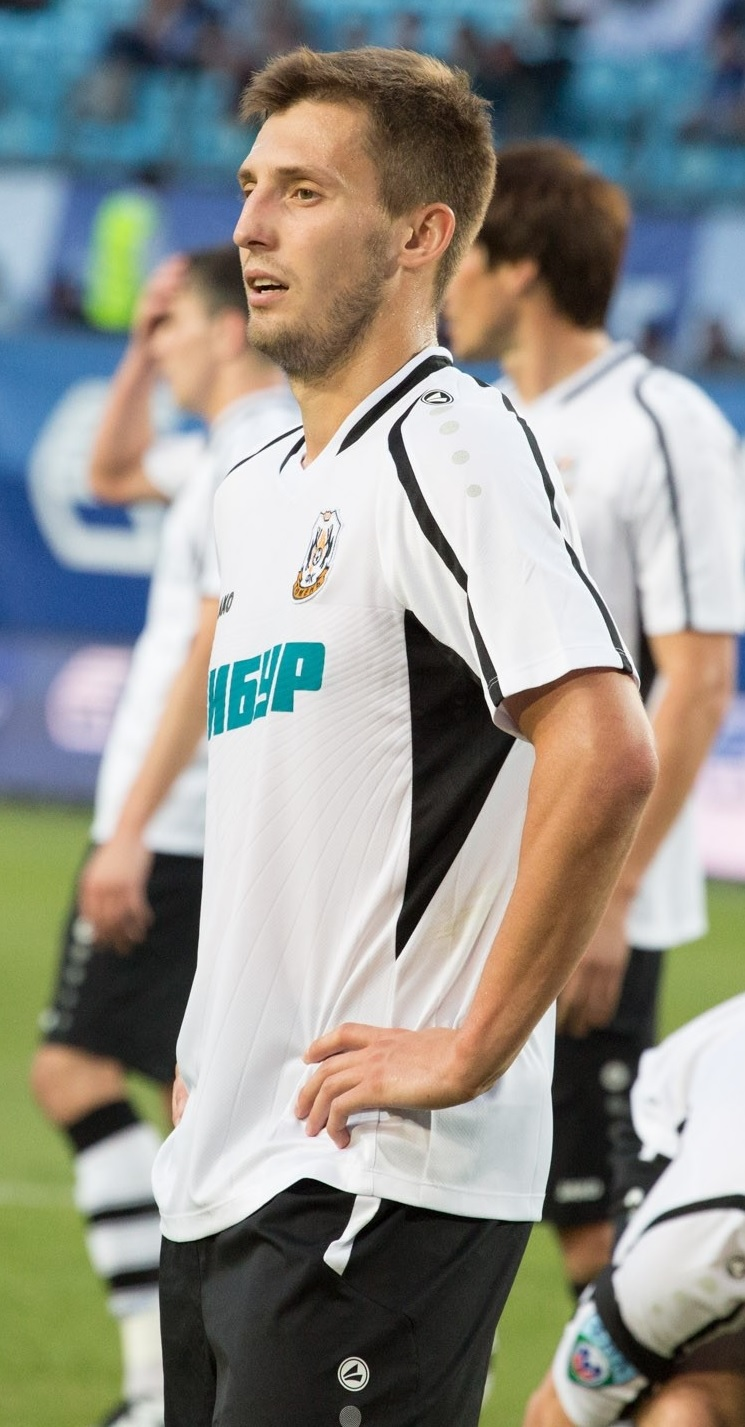
- Chudin with Tyumen in 2016

Personal information
- Full name: Ivan Viktorovich Chudin
- Date of birth: 7 March 1990 (age 36)
- Place of birth: Sverdlovsk, Russian SFSR
- Height: 1.82 m (6 ft 0 in)
- Position: Defensive midfielder

Team information
- Current team: FC KDV Tomsk
- Number: 27

Senior career*
Years	Team	Apps	(Gls)
2009–2017	FC Ural Yekaterinburg	8	(0)
2010	→ FC Gornyak Uchaly (loan)	23	(0)
2012	→ FC Metallurg-Kuzbass Novokuznetsk (loan)	1	(0)
2013–2014	→ FC Volga Ulyanovsk (loan)	27	(2)
2015–2017	→ FC Tyumen (loan)	75	(4)
2017–2019	FC Tyumen	74	(4)
2019–2020	FC Nizhny Novgorod	24	(0)
2020–2024	FC Akron Tolyatti	138	(9)
2024–2025	FC Ural Yekaterinburg	15	(0)
2025	FC Tyumen	18	(0)
2026–	FC KDV Tomsk	31	(1)
- * Club domestic league appearances and goals as of 1 November 2026

Ivan Viktorovich Chudin (Russian: Иван Викторович Чудин; born 7 March 1990) is a Russian professional football player who plays as a defensive midfielder for FC KDV Tomsk.

== Club career ==
He made his Russian Football National League debut for FC Ural Yekaterinburg on 9 August 2009 in a game against FC Luch-Energiya Vladivostok.

== Career statistics ==
Statistics accurate as of matches played on 22 August 2014

Club	Division	Season	League		Russian Cup		Total	
Club	Division	Season	Apps	Goals	Apps	Goals	Apps	Goals
FC Ural Sverdlovsk Oblast	D1	2009	7	0	0	0	7	0
FC Gornyak Uchaly (loan)	D2	2010	23	0	6	1	29	1
FC Metallurg-Kuzbass Novokuznetsk (loan)	D2	2011–12	1	0	0	0	1	0
FC Ural Sverdlovsk Oblast	NFL	2012–13	0	0	0	0	0	0
FC Volga Ulyanovsk (loan)	PFL	2013–14	27	2	2	2	29	4
FC Ural Sverdlovsk Oblast	RPL	2014–15	0	0	0	0	0	0
Career total			58	2	8	3	66	5
