= Konstantin Antipov =

Russian football player

Personal information
- Full name: Konstantin Yuryevich Antipov
- Date of birth: 17 March 1999 (age 27)
- Place of birth: Tomsk, Russia
- Height: 1.82 m (6 ft 0 in)
- Position: Forward

Team information
- Current team: KDV Tomsk
- Number: 7

Youth career
- Tom Tomsk

Senior career*
Years	Team	Apps	(Gls)
2017	Tom Tomsk	0	(0)
2017–2018	Arsenal Tula	0	(0)
2018–2019	Sibir Novosibirsk	9	(0)
2018–2019	→ Sibir-2 Novosibirsk	11	(3)
2020	Arsenal Tula	0	(0)
2020–2021	Khimik-Arsenal	19	(4)
2021–2022	Tom Tomsk	14	(0)
2023	Chernomorets Sevastopol		
2023–2024	Nosta Novotroitsk	27	(8)
2025	KDV Tomsk	7	(0)
2025	KDV-2 Tomsk		
2026–	KDV Tomsk	14	(2)
- * Club domestic league appearances and goals as of 1 November 2026

Konstantin Yuryevich Antipov (Russian: Константин Юрьевич Антипов; born 17 March 1999) is a Russian football player who plays for KDV Tomsk.

== Club career ==
He made his debut in the Russian Professional Football League for Sibir-2 Novosibirsk on 7 August 2018 in a game against Sakhalin Yuzhno-Sakhalinsk.

He made his Russian Football National League debut for Sibir Novosibirsk on 3 March 2019 in a game against Tyumen.
