= Fabian Bzdyl =

Polish footballer (born 2007)

Personal information
- Date of birth: 2 December 2007 (age 18)
- Place of birth: Kraków, Poland
- Height: 1.80 m (5 ft 11 in)
- Position: Attacking midfielder

Team information
- Current team: MŠK Žilina
- Number: 11

Youth career
- 2012–2013: Cracovia
- 2013–2015: Progres Kraków
- 2015–2024: Cracovia

Senior career*
Years	Team	Apps	(Gls)
2024–2025	Cracovia II	14	(6)
2024–2025	Cracovia	14	(2)
2025–	MŠK Žilina	31	(4)
2025	MŠK Žilina B	2	(0)

International career^{‡}
2023	Poland U16	1	(0)
2025	Poland U18	3	(1)
2025–2026	Poland U19	12	(7)
2026–	Poland U20	4	(2)
- * Club domestic league appearances and goals as of 14:03, 10 November 2026 (UTC) ‡ National team caps and goals as of 21:30, 19 November 2026 (UTC)

Fabian Bzdyl (born 2 December 2007) is a Polish professional footballer who plays as an attacking midfielder for Slovak club MŠK Žilina.

== Club career ==
=== Cracovia ===
Bzdyl joined the Cracovia academy at the age of four. For two seasons, he played for the youth teams of Progres Kraków, then returned to the Cracovia academy. In June 2023, he signed a two-year contract with the club. In February 2024, he was registered as a Ekstraklasa player.

Bzdyl made his professional debut on 10 February 2024 in a 6–0 win against Radomiak Radom, in which he came off the bench in the 84th minute, replacing Benjamin Källman. He scored his first goal for Cracovia the following season, on 29 November 2024, in the 11th minute of a 1–1 draw against Zagłębie Lubin. On 23 February 2025, Bzdyl scored his second top-flight goal in a 2–2 draw against Jagiellonia Białystok; after coming off the bench in the second half, he scored from outside the penalty area in the 73rd minute.

=== MŠK Žilina ===
On 5 September 2025, it was announced that the 17-year-old Bzdyl would be joining Slovak First League club MŠK Žilina, signing a contract until 30 June 2028. He made his debut for the Šošoni in a 3–2 win against MFK Skalica, coming off the bench as a substitute in the 68th minute for Xavier Adang. In the winter of 2026, Bzdyl played with the under-19 side, where he scored a goal in the 36th minute of a 2–1 win against Liverpool, helping his team qualify to the UEFA Youth League round of 16.

== Career statistics ==
As of match played 7 November 2026

Appearances and goals by club, season and competition
Club	Season	League			National cup (Note: Includes Slovak Cup)		Continental		Other		Total	
Club	Season	Division	Apps	Goals	Apps	Goals	Apps	Goals	Apps	Goals	Apps	Goals
Cracovia II	2024–25	IV liga Lesser Poland	13	6	—		—		—		13	6
Cracovia II	2025–26	III liga, group IV	1	0	—		—		—		1	0
Cracovia II	Total		14	6	—		—		—		14	6
Cracovia	2023–24	Ekstraklasa	1	0	0	0	—		—		1	0
Cracovia	2024–25	Ekstraklasa	11	2	0	0	—		—		11	2
Cracovia	2025–26	Ekstraklasa	2	0	—		—		—		2	0
Cracovia	Total		14	2	0	0	—		—		14	2
MŠK Žilina	2025–26	Slovak First Football League	17	1	5	0	—		—		22	1
MŠK Žilina	2026–27	Slovak First Football League	14	3	2	2	4 (Note: Two appearances in UEFA Europa League, two appearances in UEFA Conference League)	0	—		20	5
MŠK Žilina	Total		31	4	7	2	4	0	—		42	6
MŠK Žilina B	2025–26	2. Liga	2	0	—		—		—		2	0
Career total			61	12	7	2	4	0	0	0	72	14

== Honours ==
Cracovia II

- IV liga Lesser Poland: 2024–25

Žilina

- Slovak Cup: 2025–26
