= Ajdin Hasić =

Bosnian footballer (born 2001)

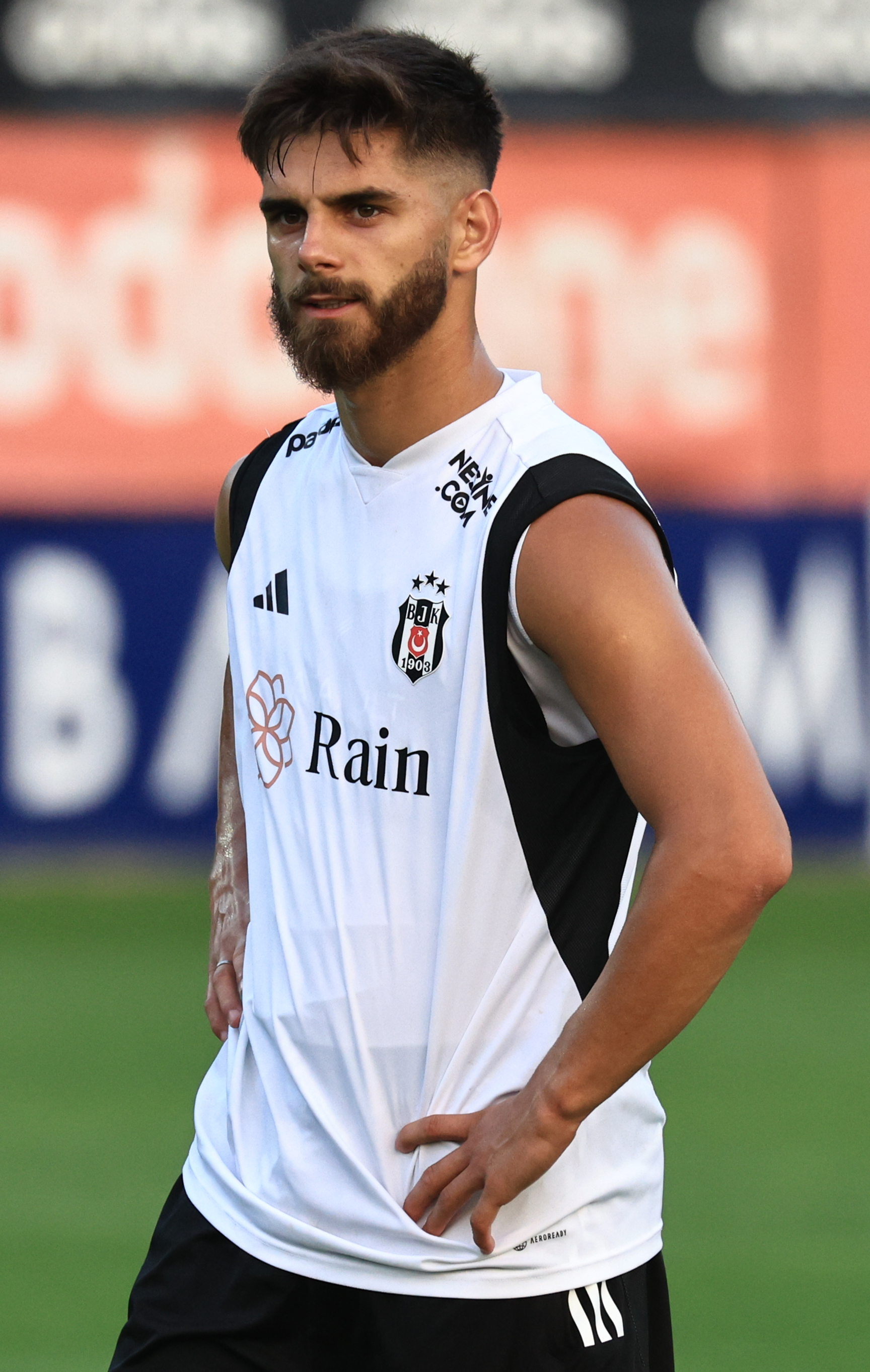
- Hasić with Beşiktaş in 2023

Personal information
- Date of birth: 7 October 2001 (age 25)
- Place of birth: Banovići, Bosnia and Herzegovina
- Height: 1.77 m (5 ft 10 in)
- Position: Winger

Team information
- Current team: Cracovia
- Number: 14

Youth career
- –2014: Budućnost Banovići
- 2014–2018: Dinamo Zagreb

Senior career*
Years	Team	Apps	(Gls)
2018–2020	Dinamo Zagreb II	5	(1)
2020–2024	Beşiktaş	8	(2)
2020	→ Ümraniyespor (loan)	8	(2)
2022	→ Ümraniyespor (loan)	8	(1)
2022–2023	→ Göztepe (loan)	8	(1)
2023–2024	→ Sarajevo (loan)	29	(8)
2024–	Cracovia	70	(17)
2024	Cracovia II	2	(1)

International career^{‡}
2017–2018	Bosnia and Herzegovina U17	14	(5)
2018–2019	Bosnia and Herzegovina U19	12	(3)
2020–2022	Bosnia and Herzegovina U21	4	(0)
2026–	Bosnia and Herzegovina	1	(0)
- * Club domestic league appearances and goals as of 8 November 2026 ‡ National team caps and goals as of 28 September 2026

Ajdin Hasić (pronounced [ǎjdin xâːsitɕ]; born 7 October 2001) is a Bosnian professional footballer who plays as a winger for Ekstraklasa club Cracovia and the Bosnia and Herzegovina national team.

Hasić started his professional career at Beşiktaş, who loaned him to Ümraniyespor in 2020 and in 2022, to Göztepe later that year and to Sarajevo in 2023. The following year, he moved to Cracovia.

A former youth international for Bosnia and Herzegovina, Hasić made his senior international debut in 2026.

== Club career ==
=== Beşiktaş ===
Hasić started playing football at his hometown club Budućnost Banovići, before joining the youth academy of Croatian team Dinamo Zagreb in 2014. He made his professional debut playing for Dinamo Zagreb's reserve squad against Bijelo Brdo on 1 September 2018 at the age of 17 and managed to score a goal. In January 2020, he moved to Turkish side Beşiktaş on a contract until June 2025. In February, he was sent on a six-month loan to Ümraniyespor.

Hasić made his official debut for Beşiktaş on 13 September against Trabzonspor. On 3 January 2021, he scored his first goal for the team in a triumph over Kayserispor.

In March, he suffered a severe knee injury, which was diagnosed as an anterior cruciate ligament tear and was ruled out for at least six months. He won his first trophy with the club on 15 May, when they were crowned league champions.

In January 2022, Hasić was loaned back to Ümraniyespor until the end of the season.

In September, he was sent on a season-long loan to Göztepe.

In August 2023, he was loaned to Sarajevo for the remainder of the campaign.

=== Cracovia ===
In August 2024, Hasić signed a three-year deal with Polish outfit Cracovia. He made his competitive debut for the side against Widzew Łódź on 5 August. On 24 August, he scored his first goal for Cracovia in a defeat of Górnik Zabrze.

== International career ==
Hasić represented Bosnia and Herzegovina at all youth levels. He also served as a captain of the under-17 and the under-19 teams.

In October 2020, he received his first senior call-up, for a friendly game against Iran and 2020–21 UEFA Nations League games against the Netherlands and Italy.

On 28 September 2026, Hasić made his senior international debut in a 2026–27 UEFA Nations League B game against Romania.

== Personal life ==
Hasić married his long-time girlfriend Aiša in June 2022.

== Career statistics ==
=== Club ===
As of match played 19 September 2026

Appearances and goals by club, season and competition
Club	Season	League			National cup (Note: Includes Turkish Cup, Bosnian Cup, Polish Cup)		Continental		Other		Total	
Club	Season	Division	Apps	Goals	Apps	Goals	Apps	Goals	Apps	Goals	Apps	Goals
Dinamo Zagreb II	2018–19	Croatian First League	5	1	—		—		—		5	1
Ümraniyespor (loan)	2019–20	1. Lig	8	2	—		—		—		8	2
Beşiktaş	2020–21	Süper Lig	8	2	4	0	1 (Note: Appearance in UEFA Europa League)	0	—		13	2
Ümraniyespor (loan)	2021–22	1. Lig	8	1	—		—		—		8	1
Göztepe (loan)	2022–23	1. Lig	8	1	2	0	—		1 (Note: Appearance in 1. Lig promotion play-offs)	0	11	1
Sarajevo (loan)	2023–24	Bosnian Premier League	29	8	4	1	—		—		33	9
Cracovia	2024–25	Ekstraklasa	29	3	1	1	—		—		30	4
Cracovia	2025–26	Ekstraklasa	27	7	1	0	—		—		28	7
Cracovia	2026–27	Ekstraklasa	9	3	1	1	—		—		10	4
Cracovia	Total		65	13	3	2	—		—		68	15
Cracovia II	2024–25	IV liga Lesser Poland	2	1	—		—		—		2	1
Career total			133	29	13	3	1	0	1	0	148	32

=== International ===
As of match played 28 September 2026

Appearances and goals by national team and year
National team	Year	Apps	Goals
Bosnia and Herzegovina
Bosnia and Herzegovina	2026	1	0
Total		1	0

== Honours ==
Beşiktaş

- Süper Lig: 2020–21
- Turkish Cup: 2020–21

Cracovia II

- IV liga Lesser Poland: 2024–25

Individual

- Ekstraklasa Player of the Month: July 2025
