= Nikita Matskharashvili =

Russian footballer

Personal information
- Full name: Nikita Omarovich Matskharashvili
- Date of birth: 30 June 1999 (age 27)
- Place of birth: Sokhumi, Georgia
- Height: 1.79 m (5 ft 10 in)
- Position: Midfielder

Team information
- Current team: KDV Tomsk
- Number: 20

Youth career
- 2012–2013: Konoplyov football academy
- 2013–2018: CSKA Moscow

Senior career*
Years	Team	Apps	(Gls)
2018–2020	Shinnik Yaroslavl	28	(0)
2021	Tyumen	10	(0)
2021–2022	Kairat Moscow	23	(7)
2022–2023	Tekstilshchik Ivanovo	26	(4)
2023–2024	Chelyabinsk	34	(3)
2024–2026	Ufa	37	(3)
2026	Sibir Novosibirsk	19	(2)
2026–	KDV Tomsk	10	(3)

International career
2016–2017	Russia U18	8	(1)
- * Club domestic league appearances and goals as of 1 November 2026

Nikita Omarovich Matskharashvili (Russian: Никита Омарович Мацхарашвили; Abkhaz: Никита Омар-иҧа Маҵхаа; born 30 June 1999) is a Russian football player of Georgian descent who plays for KDV Tomsk.

== Club career ==
Matskharashvili was raised in the CSKA Moscow youth system and played for their U19 squad in the 2016–17 UEFA Youth League and 2017–18 UEFA Youth League.

On 6 July 2018, he signed a three-year contract with Shinnik Yaroslavl.

Matskharashvili made his debut in the Russian Football National League for Shinnik Yaroslavl on 15 September 2018 in a game against Krasnodar-2 as an 82nd-minute substitute for Dmitri Samoylov.
