= Mikkel Maigaard =

Danish footballer (born 1995)

Personal information
- Full name: Mikkel Maigaard Jakobsen
- Date of birth: 20 September 1995 (age 31)
- Place of birth: Varde, Ribe, Denmark
- Height: 1.80 m (5 ft 11 in)
- Position: Attacking midfielder

Team information
- Current team: Wieczysta Kraków
- Number: 20

Youth career
- Varde
- Esbjerg

Senior career*
Years	Team	Apps	(Gls)
2013–2015	Esbjerg	0	(0)
2015–2016	Brabrand		
2016–2017	ÍBV Vestmannaeyjar	36	(4)
2018–2019	Raufoss	41	(14)
2019–2021	Strømsgodset	56	(10)
2021–2023	Sarpsborg 08	69	(18)
2024–2026	Cracovia	66	(7)
2026–	Wieczysta Kraków	17	(3)

International career
2012–2013	Denmark U18	4	(1)
2013–2014	Denmark U19	9	(2)
- * Club domestic league appearances and goals as of 21:26, 31 May 2026 (UTC)

Mikkel Maigaard Jakobsen (born 20 September 1995) is a Danish professional footballer who plays as an attacking midfielder for and captains Polish Ekstraklasa club Wieczysta Kraków.

== Club career ==
=== Esbjerg ===
Maigaard joined Esbjerg from Varde IF, when he was 13 years old.

Maigaard made his debut for the first team on 26 September 2013 against Aalborg Chang in the Danish Cup. He played a well match, and scored for Esbjerg in the 81' minute to 6–1. The game ended 7–1 to Esbjerg.

On 12 December 2013, Maigaard played his first professional game for Esbjerg. He started on the bench, but came on the pitch in the 82nd minute, where he replaced Jakob Ankersen in a Europa League match against Red Bull Salzburg, which Esbjerg lost 0–3.

In April 2014, Maigaard signed a new contract with Esbjerg, which expired in the summer 2015. The new contract contained, that he was going to join the first team squad in the summer 2014. Together with three other U19 players, Maigaard was moved to the first team squad in the summer 2014.

=== Brabrand ===
Some months after leaving Esbjerg in the summer 2015 where his contract expired, Maigaard signed with the Danish 2nd Division side Brabrand.

=== ÍBV Vestmannaeyjar ===
On 1 February 2016, it was confirmed that Maigaard had signed a two-year contract with Icelandic Úrvalsdeild side ÍBV Vestmannaeyjar. After about one-and-a-half-year at the club, the manager of the club confirmed on 23 October 2017 that Maigaard wouldn't continue at the club. He left the club immediately.

=== Raufoss ===
Maigaard signed for Norwegian 2. divisjon-side Raufoss on 12 January 2018.

=== Strømsgodset ===
On 1 August 2019, Strømsgodset announced that Maigaard had joined the club on a contract until the end of 2021.

=== Sarpsborg 08 ===
On 31 August 2021, the last day of the 2021–22 summer transfer market, Maigaard joined fellow league club Sarpsborg 08 on a deal until the end of 2023.

=== Cracovia ===
On 13 February 2024, Maigaard signed a two-and-a-half-year contract with Polish Ekstraklasa club Cracovia.

=== Wieczysta Kraków ===
On 22 January 2026, Maigaard moved to another Kraków-based side Wieczysta Kraków, playing in the second division, on a two-and-a-half-year deal.

== Career statistics ==
As of match played 31 May 2026

Appearances and goals by club, season and competition
Club	Season	League			National cup (Note: Includes Danish Cup, Icelandic Cup, Norwegian Cup, Polish Cup)		Europe		Total	
Club	Season	Division	Apps	Goals	Apps	Goals	Apps	Goals	Apps	Goals
Esbjerg	2013–14	Danish Superliga	0	0	1	0	1 (Note: Appearance in UEFA Europa League)	0	2	0
Esbjerg	2014–15	Danish Superliga	0	0	0	0	0	0	0	0
Esbjerg	Total		0	0	1	0	1	0	2	0
ÍBV	2016	Úrvalsdeild	20	2	5	0	—		25	2
ÍBV	2017	Úrvalsdeild	16	2	5	1	—		21	3
ÍBV	Total		36	4	10	1	—		46	5
Raufoss	2018	PostNord-ligaen	26	5	2	0	—		28	5
Raufoss	2019	OBOS-ligaen	15	9	2	1	—		17	10
Raufoss	Total		41	14	4	1	—		45	15
Strømsgodset	2019	Eliteserien	15	4	0	0	—		15	4
Strømsgodset	2020	Eliteserien	28	5	0	0	—		28	5
Strømsgodset	2021	Eliteserien	13	1	2	1	—		15	2
Strømsgodset	Total		56	10	2	1	—		58	11
Sarpsborg 08	2021	Eliteserien	13	0	2	1	—		15	1
Sarpsborg 08	2022	Eliteserien	27	9	3	2	—		30	11
Sarpsborg 08	2023	Eliteserien	29	9	4	1	—		33	10
Sarpsborg 08	Total		69	18	9	4	—		78	22
Cracovia	2023–24	Ekstraklasa	14	0	—		—		14	0
Cracovia	2024–25	Ekstraklasa	34	6	1	0	—		35	6
Cracovia	2025–26	Ekstraklasa	18	1	1	1	—		19	2
Cracovia	Total		66	7	2	1	—		68	8
Wieczysta Kraków	2025–26	I liga	17 (Note: Includes two appearances in I liga promotion play-offs)	3	—		—		17	3
Career total			285	56	28	8	1	0	314	64

== Honours ==
IBV

- Icelandic Cup: 2017
