= 2026–27 KS Cracovia season =

KS Cracovia
2026–27 season
- Chairman: Murat Çolak (until 30 October)
- Manager: Bartosz Grzelak (until 8 November); Aleksandar Vuković (from 11 November)
- Stadium: Józef Piłsudski Cracovia Stadium
- Ekstraklasa: 15th
- Polish Cup: First round
- Top goalscorer: League: Ajdin Hasić (7); All: Ajdin Hasić (8)
Home colours	Away colours	Third colours

The 2026–27 season is the 120th season in the history of Klub Sportowy Cracovia and their 14th consecutive season in the Ekstraklasa. The club will also compete in the Polish Cup.

== Transfers ==
=== In ===
Pos.	Player	Transferred from	Fee	Date	Source
FW	(Poland) Kacper Śmiglewski	(Poland) Puszcza Niepołomice	Loan return	30 June 2026	
DF	(Austria) Dominik Baumgartner	(Austria) Wolfsberger AC	Free	1 July 2026	
MF	(Belgium) Vincent Burlet	(France) Lille	Undisclosed	15 July 2026	
MF	(Wales) Alex Marciniak	(England) Arsenal U18	Undisclosed	18 July 2026	
MF	(Poland) Filip Marchwiński	(Italy) Lecce	Loan	18 July 2026	
FW	(Belgium) Mohamed Berte	(Belgium) FC Dender	€500,000	19 August 2026	
FW	(Tunisia) Sayfallah Ltaief	(Netherlands) FC Twente	Undisclosed	20 August 2026	
FW	(Eritrea) Siem Eyob-Abraha	(England) Sheffield United U18	Undisclosed	3 September 2026	
FW	(Norway) Lasse Nordås	(England) Luton Town	Loan	4 September 2026	

=== Out ===
Pos.	Player	Transferred to	Fee	Date	Source
FW	(Spain) Pau Sans	(Spain) Real Zaragoza	Loan return	30 June 2026	
DF	(Croatia) Boško Šutalo	(Belgium) Standard Liège	Loan return	30 June 2026	
FW	(Republic of the Congo) Gabriel Charpentier	(Romania) Argeș Pitești	End of contract	1 July 2026	
MF	(Switzerland) Maxime Dominguez	(Portugal) Marítimo	Undisclosed	1 July 2026	
DF	(Poland) Oskar Wójcik	(Germany) Werder Bremen	€3,000,000	9 July 2026	
FW	(Cameroon) Jean Batoum	(Hungary) Nyíregyháza Spartacus	Loan	14 July 2026	
MF	(Poland) Bartosz Biedrzycki	(Poland) Odra Opole	Loan	17 July 2026	
GK	(Slovakia) Henrich Ravas	(Poland) Polonia Warsaw	Loan	10 September 2026	

== Pre-season and friendlies ==
3 July 2026 Friendly	Cracovia (Poland)	1–2	(Cyprus) Pafos
17:00	Hasić 47'		7'; 35'

6 July 2026 Friendly	Cracovia (Poland)	3–1	(Turkey) İstanbul Başakşehir
17:00	Zahiroleslam 22', 25'; Tabisz 76'		Yıldırım 37'

9 July 2026 Friendly	Cracovia (Poland)	2–0	(Czech Republic) Pardubice
15:00	Hasić 10'; Klich 25'

19 July 2026 Friendly	Cracovia (Poland)	1–0	(Spain) Sevilla
16:00	Hasić 30'		Oso (red card) 84'

3 October 2026 Friendly	Cracovia (Poland)	2–3	(Poland) Bruk-Bet Termalica Nieciecza
13:00

13 November 2026 Friendly	Cracovia (Poland)	0–0	(Poland) Odra Opole	Rączna
12:00

== Competitions ==
=== Ekstraklasa ===
Pos	Team	Pld	W	D	L	GF	GA	GD	Pts	Qualification or relegation
13	Widzew Łódź	14	2	8	4	20	19	+1	14	
14	Radomiak Radom	14	4	2	8	17	29	−12	14	
15	Cracovia	14	3	3	8	16	23	−7	12	
16	Raków Częstochowa	14	4	0	10	23	31	−8	12	Relegation to I liga
17	Śląsk Wrocław	14	2	4	8	17	25	−8	10	Relegation to I liga

Updated to match(es) played on 8 November 2026. Source: ekstraklasa.org 90minut.pl
Rules for classification: 1) Points; 2) Head-to-head points; 3) Head-to-head goal difference; 4) Goal difference; 5) Goals scored; 6) Number of wins; 7) Number of away wins; 8) Lower number of points based on yellow and red cards (red card = 3 points, yellow card = 1 point, sending-off = 3 points - including 1 point for first yellow card); 9) Fairplay ranking; 10) Draw.
(Note: Head-to-head record is used only after all the matches between the teams in question have been played)

==== Results by round ====
Round	1	2
Ground	A	H
Result	D	
Position		

Updated to match(es) played on August 2024. Source:
A = Away; H = Home; W = Win; D = Draw; L = Loss

==== Matches ====
25 July 2026 1	Lech Poznań	0–0	Cracovia	Poznań
20:15				Stadium: Poznań Stadium; Referee: Damian Sylwestrzak

3 August 2026 2	Cracovia	0–2	Pogoń Szczecin	Kraków
19:00				Stadium: Józef Piłsudski Cracovia Stadium

9 August 2026 3	Śląsk Wrocław	0–0	Cracovia	Wrocław
14:45

16 August 2026 4	Cracovia	2–1	Raków Częstochowa	Kraków
17:30				Stadium: Józef Piłsudski Cracovia Stadium

21 August 2026 5	Cracovia	3–2	Wieczysta Kraków	Kraków
20:30				Stadium: Józef Piłsudski Cracovia Stadium

29 August 2026 6	Radomiak Radom	2–1	Cracovia	Radom
12:15

6 September 2026 7	Cracovia	0–1	Górnik Zabrze	Kraków
14:45				Stadium: Józef Piłsudski Cracovia Stadium

13 September 2026 8	Wisła Płock	3–1	Cracovia	Płock
12:15

19 September 2026 9	GKS Katowice	3–2	Cracovia	Katowice
17:30

10 October 2026 10	Cracovia	3–1	Zagłębie Lubin	Kraków
14:45				Stadium: Józef Piłsudski Cracovia Stadium

17 October 2026 11	Cracovia	1–1	Legia Warsaw	Kraków
20:15				Stadium: Józef Piłsudski Cracovia Stadium

24 October 2026 12	Piast Gliwice	3–1	Cracovia	Gliwice
12:15

30 October 2026 13	Cracovia	1–2	Motor Lublin	Kraków
18:00				Stadium: Józef Piłsudski Cracovia Stadium

6 November 2026 14	Wisła Kraków	2–1	Cracovia	Kraków
20:30

=== Polish Cup ===
2 September 2026 First round	Znicz Pruszków	1–1 (a.e.t.) (4–3 p)	Cracovia	Pruszków
17:30
