= Otar Kakabadze =

Georgian footballer (born 1995)

Personal information
- Date of birth: 27 June 1995 (age 31)
- Place of birth: Tbilisi, Georgia
- Height: 1.86 m (6 ft 1 in)
- Position: Right-back

Team information
- Current team: Cracovia
- Number: 25

Youth career
- 2011–2012: Dinamo Tbilisi

Senior career*
Years	Team	Apps	(Gls)
2012–2014	Dinamo Tbilisi II	17	(1)
2014–2016	Dinamo Tbilisi	40	(1)
2016–2018	Gimnàstic	44	(1)
2017	→ Esbjerg (loan)	12	(0)
2018–2020	Luzern	33	(0)
2020–2021	Tenerife	16	(0)
2021–	Cracovia	126	(11)

International career^{‡}
2011–2012	Georgia U17	9	(0)
2013–2014	Georgia U19	6	(0)
2014–2015	Georgia U21	5	(1)
2015–	Georgia	83	(0)
- * Club domestic league appearances and goals as of 15:34, 9 November 2026 (UTC) ‡ National team caps and goals as of 23:45, 17 November 2026 (UTC)

Otar Kakabadze (Order of Honor) (Georgian: ოთარ კაკაბაძე, romanized: otar k'ak'abadze, pronounced [otʰaɾ kʼakʼabadze]; born 27 June 1995) is a Georgian professional footballer who plays as a right-back for Ekstraklasa club Cracovia, which he captains, and the Georgia national team.

== Club career ==
=== Dinamo Tbilisi ===
Born in Tbilisi, Kakabadze was a Dinamo Tbilisi youth graduate. He made his debut with the reserves on 27 November 2012, starting in a 2–0 away win against Racha Ambrolauri, and scored his first senior goal in a 6–0 home routing of Kakheti Telavi on 19 October 2013.

Kakabadze was promoted to the main squad in 2014. He made his professional debut on 16 September of that year, coming on as a second-half substitute for Irakli Dzaria in a 6–0 home thrashing of Shukura Kobuleti.

Kakabadze quickly established himself as a starter at Dinamo, and scored his first professional goal on 23 October 2015, netting the winner in a 2–1 home success over FC Tskhinvali.

=== Gimnàstic ===
On 7 July 2016, Kakabadze signed a three-year deal with Spanish Segunda División side Gimnàstic de Tarragona.

On 4 January 2017, it was confirmed, that Kakabadze had signed a loan-deal with Danish Superliga club Esbjerg fB for the rest of the season. Upon returning, he became a regular starter for Nàstic.

=== FC Luzern ===
On 30 August 2018, Kakabadze was transferred to Swiss side FC Luzern.

=== Tenerife ===
On 25 September 2020, Kakabadze returned to Spain and its second division after agreeing to a contract with CD Tenerife.

=== Cracovia ===
On 12 June 2021, Ekstraklasa club Cracovia announced signing Kakabadze on a three-year deal.

During this period Kakabadze took part in 69 league matches, scoring six times. During the 2022–23 season, he was included in the Ekstraklasa Team of the Week four times.

In May 2024, his contract with the club was extended until 2027.

== International career ==
After representing Georgia at under-17, under-19 and under-21 levels, Kakabadze made his debut for the full squad on 8 October 2015, starting in a 4–0 home win against Gibraltar for the UEFA Euro 2016 qualifiers.

In late March 2024, Kakabadze played both UEFA Euro 2024 play-off matches in full and contributed to the senior team's historic achievement. In May 2024, he was selected in Georgia's squad for the tournament played in Germany. He appeared in all four of Georgia's games, as they caused an upset by qualifying for the knockout phase. Kakabadze recorded an assist in their final game of the tournament, a 1–4 loss to Spain in the round of 16.

== Career statistics ==
=== Club ===
As of match played 6 November 2026

Appearances and goals by club, season and competition
Club	Season	League			National cup (Note: Includes Georgian Cup, Copa del Rey, Swiss Cup, Polish Cup)		Europe		Other		Total	
Club	Season	Division	Apps	Goals	Apps	Goals	Apps	Goals	Apps	Goals	Apps	Goals
Dinamo Tbilisi II	2011–12	Pirveli Liga	7	0	—		—		—		7	0
Dinamo Tbilisi II	2012–13	Pirveli Liga	10	1	—		—		—		10	1
Dinamo Tbilisi II	Total		17	1	0	0	0	0	0	0	17	1
Dinamo Tbilisi	2014–15	Umaglesi Liga	23	0	6	1	—		1 (Note: Appearances in Georgian Super Cup)	0	30	1
Dinamo Tbilisi	2015–16	Umaglesi Liga	17	1	5	0	—		1	0	23	1
Dinamo Tbilisi	Total		40	1	11	1	0	0	2	0	53	2
Gimnàstic	2016–17	Segunda División	6	0	3	0	—		—		9	0
Gimnàstic	2017–18	Segunda División	36	1	—		—		—		36	1
Gimnàstic	2018–19	Segunda División	2	0	—		—		—		2	0
Gimnàstic	Total		44	1	3	0	0	0	0	0	47	1
Esbjerg (loan)	2016–17	Danish Superliga	9	0	—		—		3 (Note: Appearances in play-offs)	0	12	0
Luzern	2018–19	Swiss Super League	12	0	2	0	—		—		14	0
Luzern	2019–20	Swiss Super League	20	0	3	1	4 (Note: Appearances in UEFA Europa League)	0	—		27	1
Luzern	2020–21	Swiss Super League	1	0	—		—		—		1	0
Luzern	Total		33	0	5	1	4	0	0	0	42	1
Tenerife	2020–21	Segunda División	16	0	3	0	—		—		19	0
Cracovia	2021–22	Ekstraklasa	19	3	1	0	—		—		20	3
Cracovia	2022–23	Ekstraklasa	27	1	2	1	—		—		29	2
Cracovia	2023–24	Ekstraklasa	23	2	2	0	—		—		25	2
Cracovia	2024–25	Ekstraklasa	30	3	1	0	—		—		31	3
Cracovia	2025–26	Ekstraklasa	13	2	1	0	—		—		14	2
Cracovia	2026–27	Ekstraklasa	14	0	1	0	—		—		15	0
Cracovia	Total		126	11	8	1	0	0	0	0	134	12
Career total			285	14	30	3	4	0	5	0	324	17

=== International ===
As of match played 17 November 2026

Appearances and goals by national team and year
National team	Year	Apps	Goals
Georgia	2015	3	0
Georgia	2016	4	0
Georgia	2017	8	0
Georgia	2018	8	0
Georgia	2019	10	0
Georgia	2020	5	0
Georgia	2021	9	0
Georgia	2022	6	0
Georgia	2023	5	0
Georgia	2024	13	0
Georgia	2025	6	0
Georgia	2026	6	0
Total		83	0

== Honours ==
Dinamo Tbilisi

- Umaglesi Liga: 2013–14, 2015–16
- Georgian Cup: 2013–14, 2014–15, 2015–16
- Georgian Super Cup: 2014, 2015
