= Georgios Manolakis =

Greek footballer

Personal information
- Date of birth: 28 May 2000 (age 26)
- Place of birth: Rhodes, Greece
- Height: 1.81 m (5 ft 11 in)
- Position: Left-back

Team information
- Current team: Apollon Kalamarias
- Number: 77

Youth career
- 2013–2016: Olympiacos
- 2016–2017: Panetolikos
- 2017–2018: VfR Aalen

Senior career*
Years	Team	Apps	(Gls)
2018–2019	SSV Ulm	1	(0)
2019	FC Memmingen	3	(0)
2019–2021	Diagoras	35	(0)
2021–2022	Iraklis	19	(1)
2022–2023	Almopos Aridea	25	(0)
2023–2025	Diagoras	51	(0)
2025–2026	Nestos Chrysoupoli	19	(0)
2026–	Apollon Kalamarias	0	(0)

International career^{‡}
2015	Greece U16	3	(0)
2015	Greece U17	2	(0)
2017	Greece U18	5	(0)
- * Club domestic league appearances and goals as of 22 April 2026 ‡ National team caps and goals as of 18 January 2017

Georgios Manolakis (Greek: Γεώργιος Μανωλάκης; born 28 May 2000) is a Greek professional footballer who plays as a left-back for Super League 2 club Apollon Kalamarias.

He won the Württemberg Cup in 2018.
