= Mateusz Praszelik =

Polish footballer

Personal information
- Full name: Mateusz Jakub Praszelik
- Date of birth: 26 September 2000 (age 26)
- Place of birth: Racibórz, Poland
- Height: 1.84 m (6 ft 0 in)
- Position: Midfielder

Team information
- Current team: Cracovia
- Number: 7

Youth career
- –2014: Odra Wodzisław Śląski
- 2014–2017: Legia Warsaw

Senior career*
Years	Team	Apps	(Gls)
2017–2019	Legia Warsaw II	44	(7)
2019–2020	Legia Warsaw	5	(0)
2020–2023	Śląsk Wrocław	41	(5)
2022–2023	→ Hellas Verona (loan)	2	(0)
2023–2025	Hellas Verona	0	(0)
2023	→ Cosenza (loan)	10	(0)
2023–2024	→ Cosenza (loan)	26	(0)
2024–2025	→ Südtirol (loan)	27	(1)
2025–	Cracovia	24	(2)

International career
2015	Poland U15	2	(2)
2015–2016	Poland U16	8	(1)
2016–2017	Poland U17	9	(1)
2017–2019	Poland U19	4	(1)
2018	Poland U18	3	(0)
2019	Poland U20	2	(0)
2020–2021	Poland U21	5	(0)
- * Club domestic league appearances and goals as of 16:32, 29 May 2026 (UTC)

Mateusz Jakub Praszelik (born 26 September 2000) is a Polish professional footballer who plays as a midfielder for Ekstraklasa club Cracovia.

== Club career ==
=== Legia Warsaw ===
On 13 March 2019, he made his official debut for Legia against Raków Częstochowa, coming on at the 110th minute for Michał Kucharczyk in the Polish Cup fixture. On 21 July 2019, he made his Ekstraklasa debut against Pogoń Szczecin.

=== Śląsk Wrocław ===
On 7 July 2020, it was announced that Śląsk Wrocław had signed Praszelik on a four-year deal.

=== Hellas Verona ===
On 29 January 2022, Praszelik joined Serie A side Hellas Verona on loan until 31 January 2023, with an option to buy and a conditional obligation to buy.

==== Loans to Cosenza ====
On 26 January 2023, Praszelik was loaned by Verona to Cosenza in Serie B. On 10 August 2023, he re-joined the second division club on a season-long loan.

==== Loan to Südtirol ====
On 5 August 2024, he was sent on another season-long loan to a second-tier club, this time joining Südtirol.

=== Cracovia ===
On 9 July 2025, Praszelik moved to Ekstraklasa club Cracovia for an undisclosed fee, signing a three-year contract, with an option for a further year.

== Honours ==
Legia Warsaw

- Ekstraklasa: 2019–20

Legia Warsaw II

- Polish Cup (Masovia regionals): 2018–19

Individual

- Ekstraklasa Young Player of the Month: August 2020, September 2021
