= Roman Denisov (footballer, born 1999) =

Russian football player

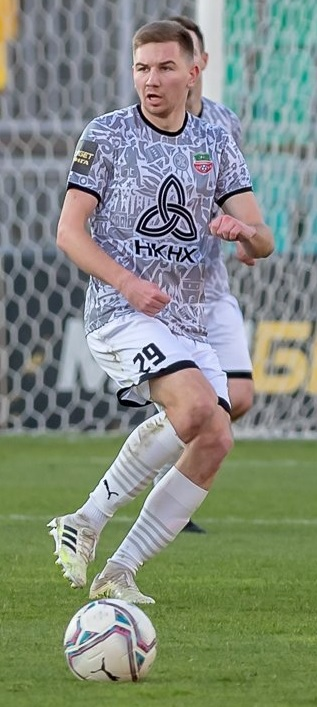
- Denisov with Neftekhimik in 2022

Personal information
- Full name: Roman Sergeyevich Denisov
- Date of birth: 14 April 1999 (age 27)
- Place of birth: Krasnogorsk, Russia
- Height: 1.81 m (5 ft 11 in)
- Position: Midfielder

Team information
- Current team: FC KDV Tomsk
- Number: 16

Youth career
- –2012: FC Zorky Krasnogorsk
- 2012–2020: FC Dynamo Moscow

Senior career*
Years	Team	Apps	(Gls)
2020–2021	FC Dynamo Moscow	0	(0)
2020	→ FC Dynamo-2 Moscow	9	(1)
2021–2024	FC Neftekhimik Nizhnekamsk	87	(4)
2024	FC Yenisey Krasnoyarsk	5	(0)
2024–2025	FC Neftekhimik Nizhnekamsk	16	(0)
2025–	FC KDV Tomsk	40	(0)

International career^{‡}
2014	Russia U15	2	(0)
2014–2015	Russia U16	12	(1)
2015–2016	Russia U17	11	(0)
2016–2017	Russia U18	10	(1)
2017	Russia U20	1	(0)
- * Club domestic league appearances and goals as of 1 November 2026 ‡ National team caps and goals as of 2 August 2017

Roman Sergeyevich Denisov (Russian: Роман Сергеевич Денисов; born 14 April 1999) is a Russian football player who plays for FC KDV Tomsk.

== Club career ==
He made his debut in the Russian Football National League for FC Neftekhimik Nizhnekamsk on 27 February 2021 in a game against FC Irtysh Omsk.
