= Gustav Henriksson =

Swedish footballer

Personal information
- Full name: Gustav Niklas Henriksson
- Date of birth: 3 February 1998 (age 28)
- Place of birth: Tanum, Sweden
- Height: 1.90 m (6 ft 3 in)
- Position: Centre-back

Team information
- Current team: Cracovia
- Number: 4

Youth career
- Grebbestads IF
- 2014–2018: IF Elfsborg

Senior career*
Years	Team	Apps	(Gls)
2012–2014	Grebbestads IF	23	(1)
2018–2021	Elfsborg	29	(2)
2021–2022	Wolfsberger AC	12	(1)
2022–2025	Elfsborg	31	(1)
2025–	Cracovia	44	(2)

International career
2014	Sweden U17	2	(0)
2020	Sweden U21	4	(1)
- * Club domestic league appearances and goals as of 16:34, 29 May 2026 (UTC)

Gustav Niklas Henriksson (born 3 February 1998) is a Swedish professional footballer who plays as a centre-back for Ekstraklasa club Cracovia.

== Club career ==
=== Grebbestads IF ===
Henriksson began his football career with hometown club Grebbestads IF. He made 23 appearances and scored one goal for the first team between 2012 and 2014.

=== IF Elfsborg ===
In the summer of 2014, Henriksson moved to IF Elfsborg, where he would join their youth academy. In August 2018, he was promoted to the first team. On 26 September 2018, Henriksson made his Allsvenskan debut in a 1–0 win over Hammarby IF.

=== Wolfsberger AC ===
On 1 February 2021, Henriksson signed with Austrian Football Bundesliga club Wolfsberger AC. He scored his first goal in his Bundesliga debut, a header, as his club beat Admira Wacker Mödling 2–1.

=== Return to Elfsborg ===
On 7 January 2022, Henriksson returned to Elfsborg on a four-year contract.

=== Cracovia ===
On 7 February 2025, Henriksson moved to Polish club Cracovia on a two-and-a-half-year deal.
