= Józef Piłsudski Cracovia Stadium =

Football stadium in Poland

- Stadion Cracovii im. Józefa Piłsudskiego
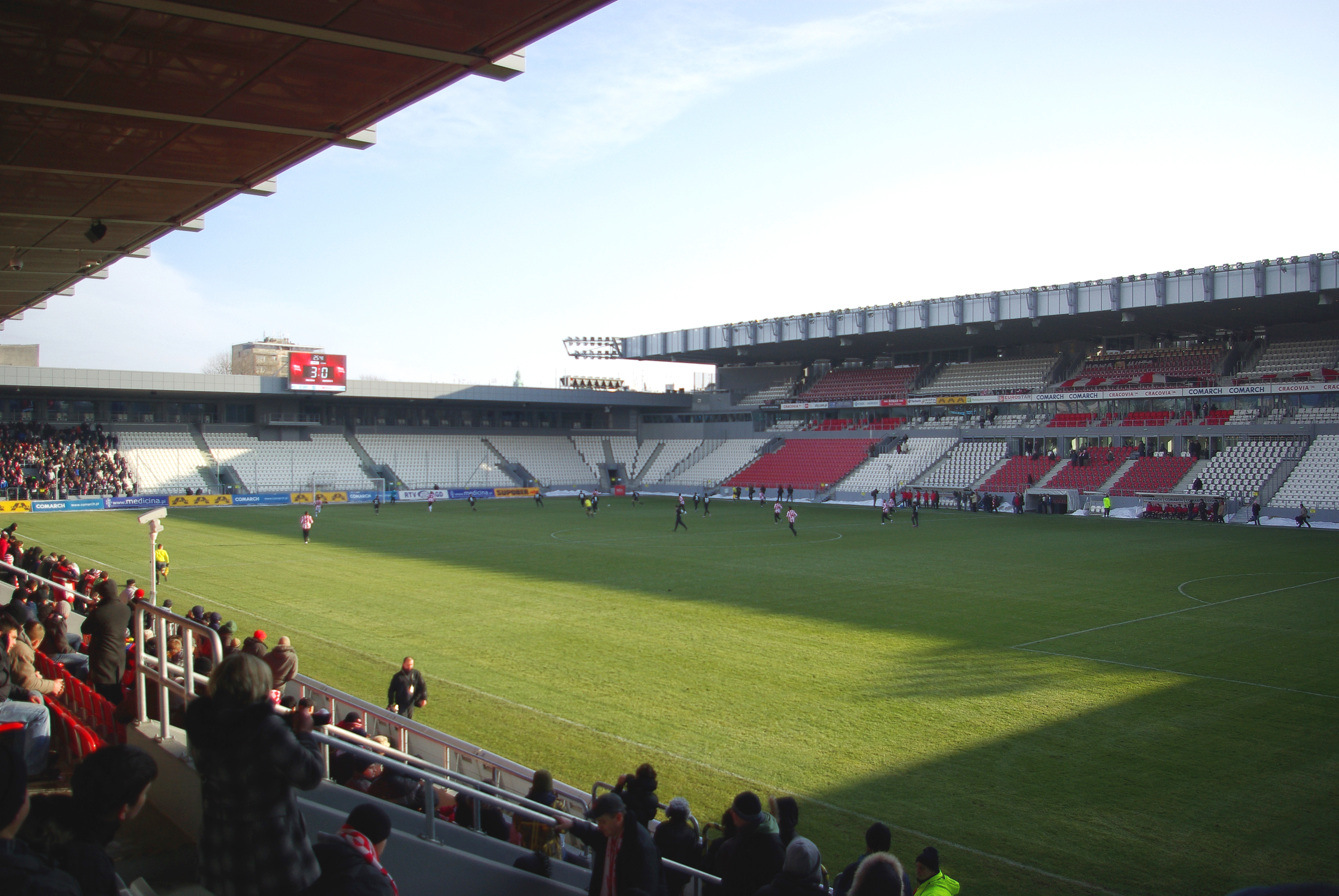
- UEFA Category 3 Stadium
- Interactive map of Józef Piłsudski Cracovia Stadium
- Former names: Stadion Cracovii
- Location: 1 Józef Kałuża Street; 30-111 Kraków, Poland
- Coordinates: 50°03′29″N 19°55′11″E
- Owner: City of Kraków
- Operator: Cracovia
- Capacity: 15,016
- Surface: Grass
- Record attendance: 14,300; Cracovia – Arka Gdynia; 25 September 2010
- Field size: 105 m x 68 m

Construction
- Groundbreaking: 1911
- Built: 1911–1912; 2009–2010
- Opened: 31 March 1912; 25 September 2010 (new stadium)
- Cost: 157 mn PLN
- Architect: Estudio Lamela

Tenants
- Cracovia (1912–present); Puszcza Niepołomice (2023–2025)

Website
- Official website

The Józef Piłsudski Cracovia Stadium (Polish: Stadion Cracovii im. Józefa Piłsudskiego) is a football stadium located in Kraków, Poland. It is used mostly for football matches and is the home ground of Cracovia. Originally, the first Cracovia stadium was built in 1912. It was demolished in mid-2009. From then until late 2010, an entirely new construction was raised in roughly the same location where the old stadium stood. After reconstruction the stadium holds 15,114 people. The stadium meets the criteria for UEFA Category 3

The stadium's design and construction has been frequently awarded in many architectural contests. In 2010, it was honored with the Janusz Bogdanowskie award, given by the Archi-Szopa Association for the best architectural construction in Kraków City. The stadium is located south of Błonia Park (in the Zwierzyniec district of Cracovia), near the stadium of Cracovia's archrival Wisła Kraków.

The stadium is named after Polish Chief of State, Marshal Józef Piłsudski

The 2018 FIFA World Cup qualification match between Ukraine and Kosovo on 9 October 2016 was played in the stadium due to Ukraine's non-recognition of Kosovo's travel documents. Ukraine's 2022–23 UEFA Nations League home fixtures were also played in this stadium due to the 2022 Russian invasion of Ukraine. From 2023 to 2025, the venue was used by Puszcza Niepołomice to host their home games following promotion to the top-flight, due to the stadium in Niepołomice not meeting the Ekstraklasa requirements.

== Construction ==
The stadium design was made by a consortium of Polish and Spanish architectural companies, Estudio Lamela Sp. z o.o, Estudio Lamela S.L., Sener Sp. z o.o. and Sener Ingenieria y Sistemas S.A. The general constructor was the consortium of German Alpine Bau Deutschland AG, Austrian Alpine Bau GmbH and Polish Alpine Construction Polska Sp. z o.o and KPBP „Budus” S.A. Cost was planned at 157 mln PLN. In June 2009, the process of construction began. Firstly, the old Cracovia stadium, built in 1912, was demolished. Construction was completed in September 2010. Cracovia played its first official match in the new stadium on 25 September 2010.

== Characteristic ==
=== Overall ===
The new stadium is located within the square of these streets: Kraszewskiego, Focha, Kałuży and Zwierzyniec. The exact location has been slightly changed in comparison to the old one. The stadium still occupies the central part of the plot, but now it is parallel to the Focha street.

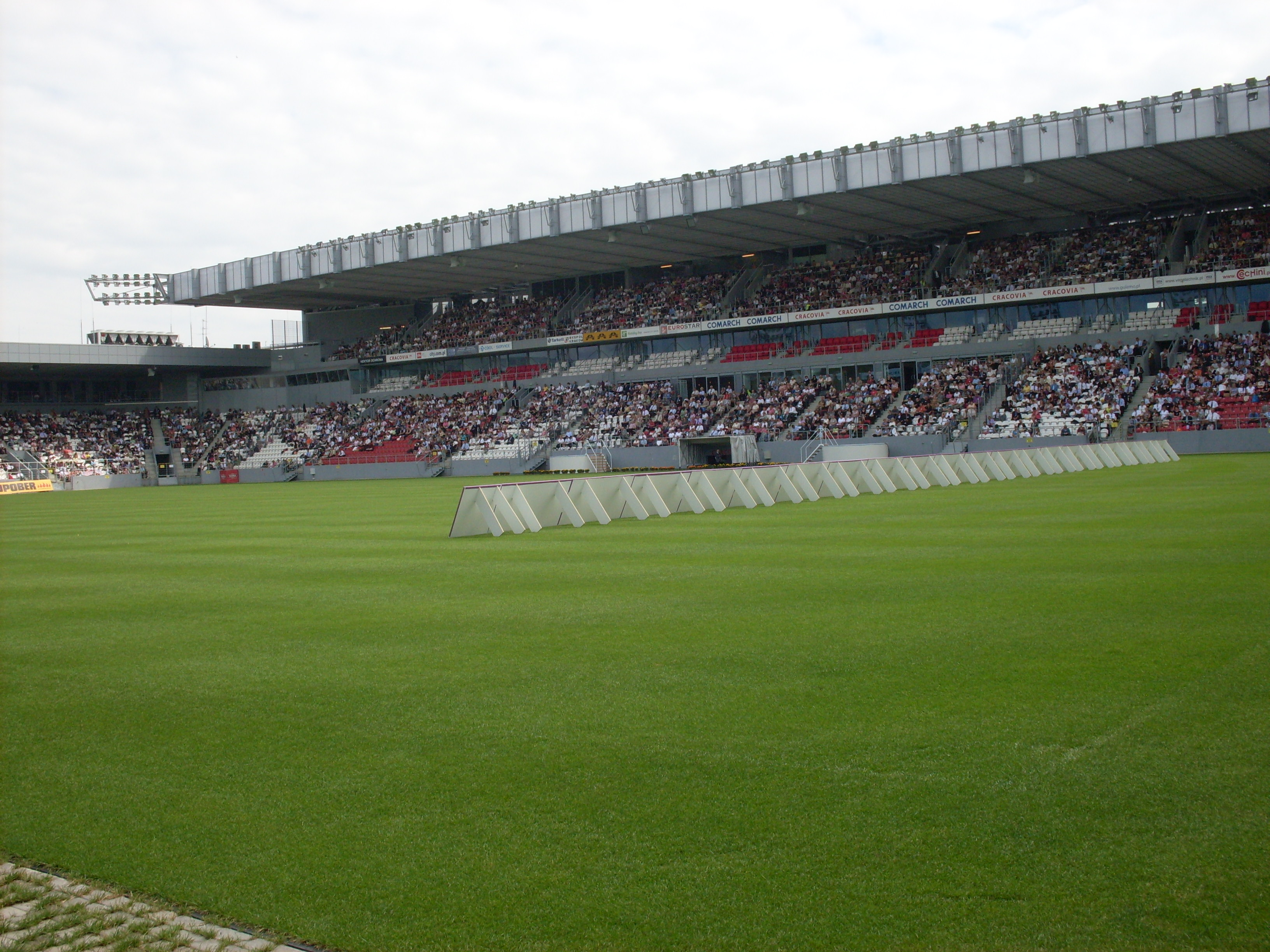
Main Stand

The stadium is a typical football-specific stadium. The field dimensions are the FIFA standard 105 x 68 meters. The distance between sideline and first row seats varies from 6m (North Stand), by 8m (East & South Stands) to 10m (West Stand). The stadium has three one-level stands and one two-level main stand. The facility is an all-seater and it is fully roofed. The building out of all four corners means that the division into separate stands is not readily visible from the exterior of the building – the stadium creates a single compact structure. Height of the stands are respectively 14, 10, 12 and 19 meters

=== South stand ===
South stand is the main stand of the stadium. Capacity is 4691 spectators. This is the only two-level stand in the stadium. The stand is divided into five sections. Three of them are located on the first level and these are: Sections G, E (14 rows each) and a VIP section which can hold 476 people with 11 rows. The other two, Section F and H (with eight and nine rows respectively) are located on the second level of the stand.

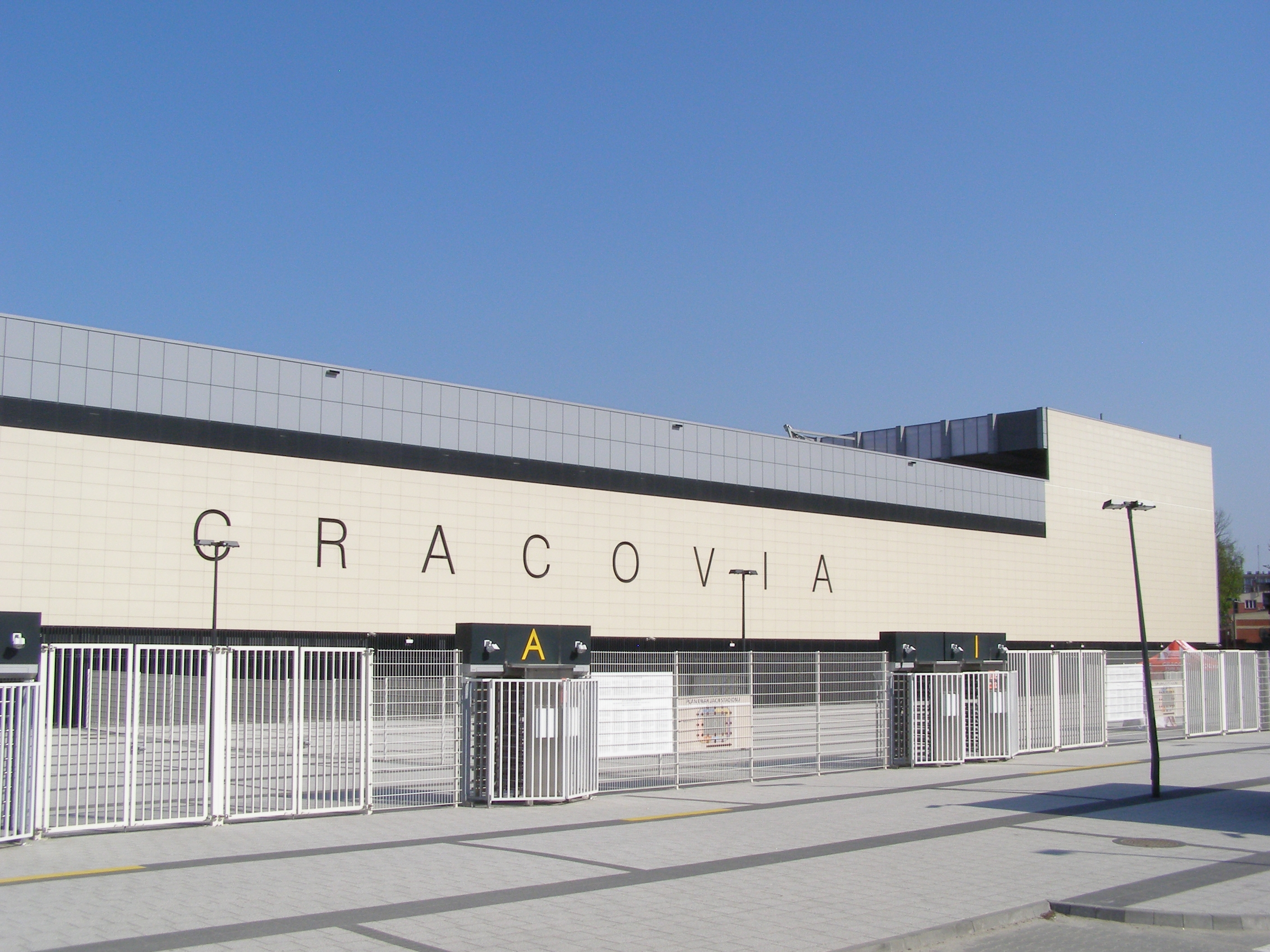
Main entrance to the stadium

=== West stand ===
West stand is located on the side of Ignacego Kraszewskiego Street. It is divided into two sections, I & J. Both have 22 rows. West stand is the largest of the three one-level stands on stadium. Section J is a section prepared especially for guest spectators. Its capacity is 1057 people. The section has its own separated entrance and foyer dedicated only to fans from visiting team.

=== East stand ===
East stand is the smallest stand of the stadium. The main representative square is located between this stand and Kałuży Street. The stand is divided into two standard sections: B (only sectors B4 and B5) and D. This is the place where the most fanatic Cracovia fans supports their team during the matches. Moreover, there are 42 places for disabled persons with another 42 dedicated for their care assistants.

=== North stand ===
The opposite to the main stand, North stand is divided into sections A and B (sectors B1, B2, B3). Each of them have 16 rows.

== See also ==
- List of football stadiums in Poland
- Lists of stadiums
- Józef Piłsudski
- Błonia Park
- Henryk Reyman Municipal Stadium
