= 2020–21 Legia Warsaw season =

Legia Warsaw
2020–21 season
- Chairman: Dariusz Mioduski
- Manager: Aleksandar Vuković (until September 21, 2020); Czesław Michniewicz (from September 21, 2020)
- Stadium: Polish Army Stadium
- Ekstraklasa: 1st
- Polish Cup: Quarter-final
- Polish Super Cup: Runners-up
- UEFA Champions League: Second qualifying round
- UEFA Europa League: Play-off round
- Top goalscorer: League: Tomáš Pekhart (22); All: Tomáš Pekhart (24)
- Highest home attendance: 11,510 v Górnik Zabrze (19 September 2020)
- Lowest home attendance: 0
- Biggest win: 6–1 v GKS Bełchatów (14 August 2020)
- Biggest defeat: 0–3 v Qarabağ (1 October 2020)
Home colours	Away colours

The 2020–21 Legia Warsaw season was the club's 104th season of existence, and their 84th in the top flight of Polish football.

== Players ==
=== Pre-season squad ===
As of 24 September 2020

Note: Flags indicate national team as defined under FIFA eligibility rules; some limited exceptions apply. Players may hold more than one non-FIFA nationality.

No.	Pos.	Nation	Player
1	GK	POL	Artur Boruc
2	DF	CRO	Josip Juranović
3	DF	POL	Mateusz Hołownia
4	DF	POL	Mateusz Wieteska
5	DF	POL	Igor Lewczuk
7	MF	CRO	Domagoj Antolić
8	MF	GEO	Valerian Gvilia
9	FW	CZE	Tomáš Pekhart
11	MF	ECU	Joel Valencia (on loan from Brentford)
14	DF	POL	Michał Karbownik (on loan from Brighton & Hove Albion)
16	DF	POR	Luís Rocha
17	MF	POL	Mateusz Cholewiak
19	GK	POL	Wojciech Muzyk
20	FW	GUI	José Kanté
21	FW	POR	Rafael Lopes

No.	Pos.	Nation	Player
22	MF	POL	Paweł Wszołek
24	MF	POR	André Martins
25	DF	SRB	Filip Mladenović
27	FW	FRA	Vamara Sanogo
29	DF	MNE	Marko Vešović
33	GK	POL	Radosław Cierzniak
34	DF	ESP	Iñaki Astiz
39	FW	POL	Maciej Rosołek
41	DF	POL	Paweł Stolarski
44	DF	FRA	William Rémy
55	DF	POL	Artur Jędrzejczyk
67	MF	POL	Bartosz Kapustka
82	MF	BRA	Luquinhas
99	MF	POL	Bartosz Slisz

=== Season squad ===
As of 24 February 2021

Note: Flags indicate national team as defined under FIFA eligibility rules; some limited exceptions apply. Players may hold more than one non-FIFA nationality.

No.	Pos.	Nation	Player
1	GK	POL	Artur Boruc
2	DF	CRO	Josip Juranović
3	DF	POL	Mateusz Hołownia
4	DF	POL	Mateusz Wieteska
5	DF	POL	Igor Lewczuk
7	FW	UZB	Jasurbek Yakhshiboev
8	MF	GEO	Valerian Gvilia
9	FW	CZE	Tomáš Pekhart
11	MF	ECU	Joel Valencia (on loan from Brentford)
13	DF	UKR	Artem Shabanov (on loan from Dynamo Kyiv)
15	DF	POL	Ariel Mosór
17	MF	POL	Mateusz Cholewiak
19	GK	POL	Wojciech Muzyk
20	FW	ALB	Ernest Muçi
21	FW	POR	Rafael Lopes
22	MF	POL	Paweł Wszołek

No.	Pos.	Nation	Player
24	MF	POR	André Martins
25	DF	SRB	Filip Mladenović
26	FW	POL	Szymon Włodarczyk
29	DF	MNE	Marko Vešović
30	FW	POL	Kacper Kostorz
31	FW	UKR	Nazariy Rusyn (on loan from Dynamo Kyiv)
33	GK	POL	Radosław Cierzniak
35	GK	POL	Cezary Miszta
55	DF	POL	Artur Jędrzejczyk
59	GK	POL	Kacper Tobiasz
63	MF	POL	Jakub Kisiel
67	MF	POL	Bartosz Kapustka
71	MF	POL	Kacper Skibicki
82	MF	BRA	Luquinhas
99	MF	POL	Bartosz Slisz

=== Transfers ===
==== In ====
No.	Pos	Player	From	Type	Fee	Date	Source
25	DF	(Serbia) Filip Mladenović	Lechia Gdańsk	Transfer	Free	1 July 2020	
2	DF	(Croatia) Josip Juranović	(Croatia) Hajduk Split	Transfer	€400,000	29 July 2020	
3	DF	(Poland) Mateusz Hołownia	Wisła Kraków	Loan	Back from loan	31 July 2020	
1	GK	(Poland) Artur Boruc	(England) AFC Bournemouth	Transfer	Free	1 August 2020	
21	FW	(Portugal) Rafael Lopes	Cracovia	Transfer	€150,000	1 August 2020	
67	MF	(Poland) Bartosz Kapustka	(England) Leicester City	Transfer	Free	13 August 2020	
14	DF	(Poland) Michał Karbownik	(England) Brighton & Hove Albion	Loan	Free	6 October 2020	
7	FW	(Uzbekistan) Jasurbek Yakhshiboev	(Uzbekistan) Pakhtakor Tashkent FK	Transfer	€300,000	12 February 2021	
20	FW	(Albania) Ernest Muçi	(Albania) KF Tirana	Transfer	€650,000	21 February 2021	

==== Out ====
No.	Pos	Player	To	Type	Fee	Date	Source
1	GK	(Poland) Radosław Majecki	Monaco	Loan	End of loan	30 June 2020	
77	MF	(Poland) Mateusz Praszelik	Śląsk Wrocław	Transfer	Free	30 June 2020	
—	DF	(Poland) Mateusz Żyro	Stal Mielec	Transfer	Unknown	5 August 2020	
31	MF	(Poland) Piotr Pyrdoł	Wisła Płock	Transfer	Unknown	26 August 2020	
14	DF	(Poland) Michał Karbownik	(England) Brighton & Hove Albion	Loan	Loan	6 October 2020	
27	DF	(France) Vamara Sanogo	(Georgia (country)) Dinamo Batumi	Contract termination	Free	18 December 2020	
44	DF	(France) William Rémy	free agent	Contract termination	Free	18 December 2020	
41	DF	(Poland) Paweł Stolarski	Pogoń Szczecin	Contract termination	Free	22 December 2020	
39	FW	(Poland) Maciej Rosołek	Arka Gdynia	Loan	Loan	30 December 2020	
14	DF	(Poland) Michał Karbownik	(England) Brighton & Hove Albion	End of loan	Free	17 January 2021	

== Friendlies ==
In January 2021, Legia Warsaw faced Liwa FC (8–0 victory), Dynamo Kyiv (2–0 victory), FC Krasnodar (0–0 draw), Stomil Olsztyn (3–1 victory) and Legia Warsaw II (3–0 victory).

== Competitions ==
=== Ekstraklasa ===
==== League table ====
Pos	Team	Pld	W	D	L	GF	GA	GD	Pts	Qualification or relegation
1	Legia Warsaw (C)	30	19	7	4	48	24	+24	64	Qualification for the Champions League first qualifying round
2	Raków Częstochowa	30	17	8	5	46	25	+21	59	Qualification for the Europa Conference League second qualifying round (Note: Raków Częstochowa qualified for the Europa Conference League by winning the 2020–21 Polish Cup and also by finishing second in the Ekstraklasa. As a result, the berth reserved for third place was passed to the fourth-placed team from the 2020–21 Ekstraklasa.)
3	Pogoń Szczecin	30	15	7	8	36	23	+13	52	Qualification for the Europa Conference League second qualifying round
4	Śląsk Wrocław	30	11	10	9	36	32	+4	43 (Note: Head-to-head points: Śląsk Wrocław 6, Warta Poznań 0.)	Qualification for the Europa Conference League first qualifying round
5	Warta Poznań	30	13	4	13	33	32	+1	43	

Source: ekstraklasa.org
Rules for classification: 1) Points; 2) Head-to-head points; 3) Head-to-head goal difference; 4) Head-to-head goals scored; 5) Head-to-head away goals scored (only if between two teams); 6) Goal difference; 7) Goals scored; 8) Number of wins; 9) Number of away wins; 10) Fairplay ranking; 11) Draw
(C) Champions

==== Results summary ====
Overall								Home						Away					
Pld	W	D	L	GF	GA	GD	Pts	W	D	L	GF	GA	GD	W	D	L	GF	GA	GD
30	19	7	4	48	24	+24	64	9	3	3	29	19	+10	10	4	1	19	5	+14

Last updated: 16 May 2021.
Source: 90minut.pl

==== Results by round ====
Matchday	1	2	3	4	5	6	7	8	9	10	11	12	13	14	15	16	17	18	19	20	21	22	23	24	25	26	27	28	29	30
Ground	A	H	A	H	H	A	H	A	H	A	H	H	A	H	A	H	A	H	A	A	H	A	H	A	H	A	A	H	A	H
Result	W	L	W	L	W	W	W	D	W	W	D	W	W	L	L	W	D	W	W	W	W	W	W	D	D	W	W	D	D	W
Position	3	6	4	7	8	9	8	5	2	1	2	1	1	1	2	2	2	1	1	1	1	1	1	1	1	1	1	1	1	1

Updated to match(es) played on 16 May 2021. Source: 90minut
A = Away; H = Home; W = Win; D = Draw; L = Loss; P = Postponed

==== Matches ====
Win Draw Loss

22 August 2020 1	Raków Częstochowa	1–2	Legia Warsaw	Bełchatów, Poland
20:00 CEST (UTC+2)	Wilusz (yellow card) 7' (yellow-red card) 45'; Gutkovskis (yellow card) 22'; Sapała (yellow card) 50'; Kun 50'	Report	Pekhart 16', 84' (yellow card) 68'; Rocha (yellow card) 45'; Mladenović (yellow card) 72'; Luquinhas (yellow card) 77'	Stadium: Stadion GKS; Attendance: 1,985; Referee: Jarosław Przybył (Kluczbork)

29 August 2020 2	Legia Warsaw	1–2	Jagiellonia Białystok	Warsaw, Poland
20:00 CEST (UTC+2)	Pekhart 60'	Report	Puljić 19'; Imaz 28'	Stadium: Polish Army Stadium; Attendance: 10,000; Referee: Bartosz Frankowski (Toruń)

11 September 2020 3	Wisła Płock	0–1	Legia Warsaw	Płock, Poland
20:30 CEST (UTC+2)		Report	Pekhart 30'	Stadium: Kazimierz Górski Stadium; Attendance: 1,500; Referee: Krzysztof Jakubik (Siedlce)

19 September 2020 4	Legia Warsaw	1–3	Górnik Zabrze	Warsaw, Poland
20:00 CEST (UTC+2)	Slisz 60'	Report	Sobczyk 4'; Nowak 17'; Jiménez 47'	Stadium: Polish Army Stadium; Attendance: 11,510; Referee: Paweł Gil (Lublin)

21 October 2020 (Note: Match originally scheduled for 27 September 2020, 17:30 CEST (UTC+02:00) was postponed by Ekstraklasa due to 2020–21 UEFA Europa League Play-off round match preparation. Matched rescheduled to 21 October 2020, 18:00 CEST (UTC+02:00).) 5	Legia Warsaw	2–1	Śląsk Wrocław	Warsaw, Poland
18:00 CEST (UTC+2)	Juranović 46'; Pekhart 73'	Report	Piasecki 81'	Stadium: Polish Army Stadium; Attendance: 0 Referee: Sebastian Jarzębak (Bytom)
Note: Match originally scheduled for 27 September 2020, 17:30 CEST (UTC+02:00) was postponed by Ekstraklasa due to 2020–21 UEFA Europa League Play-off round match preparation. Matched rescheduled to 21 October 2020, 18:00 CEST (UTC+02:00).

2 November 2020 (Note: Match originally scheduled for 4 October 2020, 15:00 CEST (UTC+2).) 6	Warta Poznań	0–3	Legia Warsaw	Grodzisk Wielkopolski, Poland
18:00		Report	Wszołek 12'; Mladenović 23'; Pekhart 30'	Stadium: Dyskobolia Stadium; Attendance: 0 Referee: Paweł Gil (Lublin)
Note: Match originally scheduled for 4 October 2020, 15:00 CEST (UTC+2) was postponed by Ekstraklasa due to the coronavirus case detected in the Warta Poznań team

18 October 2020 7	Legia Warsaw	2–1	Zagłębie Lubin	Warsaw, Poland
17:30 CEST (UTC+2)	Pekhart 30', 53'	Report	Starzyński 38' (pen.)	Stadium: Polish Army Stadium; Attendance: 0 Referee: Piotr Lasyk (Bytom)

24 October 2020 8	Pogoń Szczecin	0–0	Legia Warsaw	Szczecin, Poland
20:00 CEST (UTC+2)		Report		Stadium: Stadion Florian Krygier; Attendance: 0 Referee: Szymon Marciniak (Płock)

8 November 2020 9	Legia Warsaw	2–1	Lech Poznań	Warsaw
15:00 CET (UTC+01:00)	Skibicki 68'; Lopes 90+3'	Ekstraklasa; 90minut	Juranović 29' (o.g.)	Stadium: Polish Army Stadium; Attendance: 0 Referee: Szymon Marciniak (Płock)

22 November 2020 10	Cracovia	0–1	Legia Warsaw	Kraków, Poland
17:30 CEST (UTC+2)			Mladenović 51'	Stadium: Stadion Miejski Cracovii; Attendance: 0

29 November 2020 11	Legia Warsaw	2–2	Piast Gliwice	Warsaw, Poland
17:30 CEST (UTC+2)	Kapustka 13'; Pekhart 57' (pen.)	Report	Malarczyk 29'; Świerczok 79'	Stadium: Polish Army Stadium; Attendance: 0 Referee: Bartosz Frankowski (Toruń)

5 December 2020 12	Legia Warsaw	2–0	Lechia Gdańsk	Warsaw, Poland
20:00 CEST (UTC+2)	Pekhart 61'; Lopes 90'	Report		Stadium: Polish Army Stadium; Attendance: 0 Referee: Paweł Gil (Lublin)

12 December 2020 13	Wisła Kraków	1–2	Legia Warsaw	Kraków, Poland
20:00 CEST (UTC+2)	Yeboah 12'	Report	Pekhart 81' (pen.) 89'	Stadium: Stadion Miejski Wisły; Attendance: 0 Referee: Jarosław Przybył (Kluczbork)

18 December 2020 14	Legia Warsaw	2–3	Stal Mielec	Warsaw, Poland
20:30 CEST (UTC+2)	Slisz 17'; Pekhart 24'; Jędrzejczyk (yellow card) 58'; Luquinhas (yellow card) 84'; Wieteska (yellow card) 90+3'	Report	Domański 5' (pen.) 43' (pen.); Tomasiewicz (yellow card) 8' (goal) 60' (pen.); Mateusz Żyro (yellow card) 48'; Pawłowski (yellow card) 90+6'	Stadium: Polish Army Stadium; Attendance: 0 Referee: (Poland) Bartosz Frankowski

31 January 2021 15	Podbeskidzie	1–0	Legia Warsaw	Bielsko-Biała, Poland
17:30 CEST (UTC+2)	Janicki 48'	Report		Stadium: Stadion Miejski; Attendance: 0 Referee: Szymon Marciniak (Płock)

6 February 2021 16	Legia Warsaw	2–0	Raków Częstochowa	Warsaw, Poland
20:00 CEST (UTC+2)	Luquinhas 29'; Pekhart 64' (pen.)	Report		Stadium: Polish Army Stadium; Attendance: 0 Referee: Paweł Gil (Lublin)

14 February 2021 17	Jagiellonia Białystok	1–1	Legia Warsaw	Białystok, Poland
17:30 CEST (UTC+2)	Imaz 4' (pen.)	Report	Pekhart 18' (pen.)	Stadium: Stadion Miejski; Attendance: 0 Referee: Szymon Marciniak (Płock)

20 February 2021 18	Legia Warsaw	5–2	Wisła Płock	Warsaw, Poland
15:00 CEST (UTC+2)	Mladenović 10' (pen.), 40'; Kapustka 16'; Luquinhas 49', 80'	Report	Lagator 43'; Lesniak 45'	Stadium: Polish Army Stadium; Attendance: 0 Referee: Mariusz Złotek (Stalowa Wola)

27 February 2021 19	Górnik Zabrze	1–2	Legia Warsaw	Zabrze
20:00 CEST (UTC+2)	Procházka (yellow card) 21'; Gryszkiewicz (yellow card) 33'; Janža (yellow card) 39'; Jesús Jiménez 45+2' (pen.); Nowak (yellow card) 45+3'	Report	Kapustka 4'; André Martins (yellow card) 26'; Jędrzejczyk (yellow card) 45'; Luquinhas (yellow card) 57'; Kostorz 82'	Stadium: Arena Zabrze; Attendance: 0 Referee: (Poland) Bartosz Frankowski
Note: COVID-19 pandemic in Poland

7 March 2021 20	Śląsk Wrocław	0–1	Legia Warsaw	Wrocław, Poland
17:30 CET (UTC+1)			Wszołek 64'	Stadium: Stadion Miejski; Attendance: 0 Referee: (Poland) Sebastian Jarzębak
Note: COVID-19 pandemic in Poland

13 March 2021 21	Legia Warsaw	3–2	Warta Poznań	Warsaw
20:00 CET (UTC+1)	Mladenović 3' (yellow card) 52' (goal) 60'; Wszołek 30'; Slisz (yellow card) 34'	Report	Zreľák (yellow card) 9'; Ławniczak (yellow card) 21'; Grzesik 27'; Kupczak 79' (pen.)	Stadium: Polish Army Stadium; Attendance: 0 Referee: (Poland) Piotr Lasyk
Note: COVID-19 pandemic in Poland

21 March 2021 22	Zagłębie Lubin	0–4	Legia Warsaw	Lubin
17:30 CET (UTC+1)		Report	Pekhart 6' (pen.) 13' 19' 63'; Wieteska (yellow card) 47'	Stadium: Zagłębie Lubin Stadium; Attendance: 0 Referee: (Poland) Paweł Gil
Note: COVID-19 pandemic in Poland

3 April 2021 23	Legia Warsaw	4–2	Pogoń Szczecin	Warsaw
17:30 CET (UTC+1)	Mladenović 4'; Pekhart 10' 14' (pen.); Wieteska 29' (yellow card) 51'; Shabanov (yellow card) 58'; André Martins (yellow card) 69'	Report	Triantafyllopoulos (yellow card) 43'; Frączczak 45+1'; Dąbrowski (yellow card) 55'; Kozłowski (yellow card) 66'; Drygas 83' (pen.) (yellow card) 89'	Stadium: Polish Army Stadium; Attendance: 0 Referee: (Poland) Szymon Marciniak
Note: COVID-19 pandemic in Poland

11 April 2021 24	Lech Poznań	0–0	Legia Warsaw	Poznań
17:30 CET (UTC+1)	Kamiński (yellow card) 43'; Salamon (yellow card) 60'; Karlström (yellow card) 82'	Report	Mladenović (yellow card) 84'	Stadium: INEA Stadion; Attendance: 0 Referee: (Poland) Bartosz Frankowski
Note: COVID-19 pandemic in Poland

18 April 2021 25	Legia Warsaw	0–0	Cracovia	Warsaw
17:30 CET (UTC+1)		Report	Hanca (yellow card) 6'; Dimun (yellow card) 56'	Stadium: Polish Army Stadium; Attendance: 0 Referee: (Poland) Damian Sylwestrzak
Note: COVID-19 pandemic in Poland

21 April 2021 26	Piast Gliwice	0–1	Legia Warsaw	Gliwice
20:30 CET (UTC+1)	Chrapek (yellow card) 60'; Milewski (yellow card) 90+3'	Report	Rafael Lopes (yellow card) 71' (goal) 75'	Stadium: Stadion Miejski (Gliwice); Attendance: 0 Referee: (Poland) Damian Kos
Note: COVID-19 pandemic in Poland

25 April 2021 27	Lechia Gdańsk	0–1	Legia Warsaw	Gdańsk
17:30 CET (UTC+1)	Biegański (yellow card) 28'; Maloča (yellow card) 70'; Alomerović (yellow card) 90+5'	Report	Hołownia (yellow card) 44'; Pekhart (yellow card) 52' (goal) 71' (pen.)	Stadium: Stadion Energa Gdańsk; Attendance: 0 Referee: (Poland) Jarosław Przybył
Note: COVID-19 pandemic in Poland

1 May 2021 28	Legia Warsaw	0–0	Wisła Kraków	Warsaw
15:00 CET (UTC+1)	Hołownia (yellow card) 49'	Report	Piotr Starzyński (yellow card) 9'; Burliga (yellow card) 43'; Konrad Gruszkowski (yellow card) 73'	Stadium: Polish Army Stadium; Attendance: 0 Referee: (Poland) Szymon Marciniak
Note: COVID-19 pandemic in Poland

9 May 2021 29	Stal Mielec	0–0	Legia Warsaw	Mielec
17:30 CET (UTC+1)	Jonathan de Amo (yellow card) 23'; Kolev (yellow card) 82'; Tomasiewicz (yellow card) 83'	Report	Hołownia (yellow card) 9'; Mladenović (yellow card) 78'; Slisz (yellow card) 83'	Stadium: Stadion MOSiR; Attendance: 0 Referee: (Poland) Łukasz Kuźma
Note: COVID-19 pandemic in Poland

16 May 2021 30	Legia Warsaw	1–0	Podbeskidzie	Warsaw
17:30 CET (UTC+1)	Rafael Lopes 24'	Report		Stadium: Polish Army Stadium; Attendance: 8,000; Referee: (Poland) Bartosz Frankowski

=== Polish Super Cup ===
9 October 2020 (Note: Match originally scheduled to 9 August 2020, 20:00 CEST (UTC+02:00) was postponed due to COVID-19 disease detection in Legia Warsaw team.)	Legia Warsaw	0–0 (4–5 p)	Cracovia	Warsaw
20:15 CEST (UTC+02:00)		Report		Stadium: Polish Army Stadium; Attendance: 6,475; Referee: Wojciech Myć (Lublin)
	Penalties
	Antolić (penalty scored); Valencia (penalty scored); Cholewiak (penalty scored); Wszołek (penalty missed); Juranović (penalty scored)		(penalty scored) van Amersfoort; (penalty scored) Sadiković; (penalty scored) Vestenický; (penalty scored) Fiolić; (penalty scored) Dimun

=== Polish Cup ===
14 August 2020 Round of 64	GKS Bełchatów	1–6	Legia Warsaw	Bełchatów
20:30 CEST (UTC+02:00)	Hilbrycht 33'	Łączy nas piłka 90minut	Rosołek 12', 28', 67'; Pawlik 44' (o.g.); Wszołek 53'; Mladenović 60'	Stadium: GIEKSA Arena; Attendance: 2,200; Referee: Damian Sylwestrzak (Wrocław)

25 November 2020 Round of 32	Widzew Łódź	0–1	Legia Warsaw	Łódź
CET (UTC+01:00)		Łączy nas piłka 90minut	Cholewiak 6'	Stadium: Stadion Miejski Widzewa; Attendance: 0 Referee: Jarosław Przybył (Kluczbork)
Note: Match originally scheduled on 30 October 2020, 20:00 CET (UTC+01:00) was postponed due to COVID-19 disease detection in Widzew Łódź team.

9 February 2021 Round of 16	ŁKS Łódź	2–3	Legia Warsaw	Łódź
20:30 CET (UTC+01:00)	Sobociński 42'; Janczukowicz 56'	Łączy nas piłka 90minut	Slisz 14'; Luquinhas 49'; Pekhart 82'	Stadium: Stadion Miejski ŁKS; Attendance: 0 Referee: Tomasz Wajda (Żywiec)

3 March 2021 Quarter-finals	Legia Warsaw	1–2	Piast Gliwice	Warsaw
20:30 CET (UTC+01:00)	Slisz (yellow card) 30'; Rafael Lopes 66'	Report	Świerczok 8'; Chrapek (yellow card) 10'; Tiago Alves 78'; Mateusz Winciersz (yellow card) 90+2'	Stadium: Stadion Wojska Polskiego; Attendance: 0 Referee: Jarosław Przybył (Kluczbork)

=== Champions League ===
==== Qualifying phase ====
18 August 2020 1Q	Legia Warsaw (Poland)	1–0	(Northern Ireland) Linfield	Polish Army Stadium, Warsaw
19:00	Kanté 82'	Report		Attendance: 0 Referee: Nicolas Laforge (Belgium)

26 August 2020 2Q	Legia Warsaw (Poland)	0–2 (a.e.t.)	(Cyprus) Omonia	Polish Army Stadium, Warsaw
20:00		Report	Gómez 92' (pen.); Thiago 107'	Attendance: 0 Referee: Nathan Verboomen (Belgium)

=== Europa League ===
==== Qualifying phase ====
24 September 2020 3Q	Legia Warsaw (Poland)	2–0	(Kosovo) Drita	Polish Army Stadium, Warsaw
20:30	Wszołek 24'; Pekhart 43'	Report		Attendance: 0 Referee: Halis Özkahya (Turkey)

1 October 2020 PO	Legia Warsaw (Poland)	0–3	(Azerbaijan) Qarabağ	Polish Army Stadium, Warsaw
20:00		Report	Andrade 50'; Zoubir 62'; Ozobić 70'	Attendance: 0 Referee: Tobias Stieler (Germany)

== Statistics ==
=== Goalscorers ===
As of 12 December 2020.

Place	Number	Position	Nation	Name	Ekstraklasa	Polish Cup	UEFA Champions League	UEFA Europa League	Total
1	9	FW	(Czech Republic)	Tomáš Pekhart	12	0	0	1	13
2	39	FW	(Poland)	Maciej Rosołek	0	3	0	0	3
2	22	MF	(Poland)	Paweł Wszołek	1	1	0	1	3
2	25	DF	(Serbia)	Filip Mladenović	2	1	0	0	3
5	21	FW	(Portugal)	Rafael Lopes	2	0	0	0	2
6	20	FW	(Guinea)	José Kanté	0	0	1	0	1
6	99	MF	(Poland)	Bartosz Slisz	1	0	0	0	1
6	2	DF	(Croatia)	Josip Juranović	1	0	0	0	1
6	67	DF	(Poland)	Bartosz Kapustka	1	0	0	0	1
6	17	MF	(Poland)	Mateusz Cholewiak	0	1	0	0	1
6	71	MF	(Poland)	Kacper Skibicki	1	0	0	0	1
TOTALS					21	6	1	2	30
