= 2019–20 Legia Warsaw season =

Legia Warsaw
2019-20 season
- Chairman: Dariusz Mioduski
- Manager: Aleksandar Vuković (from 9 April 2019)
- Stadium: Polish Army Stadium
- Ekstraklasa: 1st
- Polish Cup: Semi-finals
- UEFA Europa League: Play-off round
- Top goalscorer: League: Jarosław Niezgoda (14); All: Jarosław Niezgoda (14)
Home colours	Away colours	Third colours

The 2019–20 Legia Warsaw season is the club's 103rd season of existence, and their 83rd in the top flight of Polish football.

== Players ==
=== Current squad ===
As of 27 July 2019

Note: Flags indicate national team as defined under FIFA eligibility rules; some limited exceptions apply. Players may hold more than one non-FIFA nationality.

No.	Pos.	Nation	Player
1	GK	POL	Radosław Majecki
3	MF	POL	Tomasz Jodłowiec
4	DF	POL	Mateusz Wieteska
5	DF	POL	Igor Lewczuk
7	MF	CRO	Domagoj Antolić
8	MF	GEO	Valerian Gvilia
9	FW	ESP	Carlitos
11	FW	POL	Jarosław Niezgoda
14	MF	POL	Michał Karbownik
16	DF	POR	Luís Rocha
18	MF	LTU	Arvydas Novikovas
19	GK	POL	Wojciech Muzyk
20	FW	GUI	José Kanté
21	MF	HUN	Dominik Nagy
23	MF	POR	Salvador Agra

No.	Pos.	Nation	Player
24	MF	POR	André Martins
26	MF	POR	Cafú
27	FW	FRA	Vamara Sanogo
29	MF	MNE	Marko Vešović
30	MF	POL	Kacper Kostorz
33	GK	POL	Radosław Cierzniak
34	DF	ESP	Iñaki Astiz
37	DF	SRB	Ivan Obradović
39	DF	POL	Maciej Rosołek
41	DF	POL	Paweł Stolarski
44	DF	FRA	William Rémy
55	DF	POL	Artur Jędrzejczyk
77	MF	POL	Mateusz Praszelik
82	MF	BRA	Luquinhas
99	FW	CRO	Sandro Kulenović

=== Out on loan ===
Note: Flags indicate national team as defined under FIFA eligibility rules; some limited exceptions apply. Players may hold more than one non-FIFA nationality.

No.	Pos.	Nation	Player
5	DF	POL	Mateusz Hołownia (at Śląsk Wrocław)
12	FW	GHA	Sadam Sulley (at MFK Zemplín Michalovce)
17	MF	POL	Mikołaj Kwietniewski (at Bytovia Bytów)

No.	Pos.	Nation	Player
23	DF	POL	Mateusz Żyro (at Miedź Legnica)
—	MF	POL	Tomasz Nawotka (at Zagłębie Sosnowiec)
—	MF	POL	Kacper Skibicki (at Olimpia Grudziądz)

=== Transfers ===
==== In ====
No.	Pos	Player	From	Type	Fee	Date	Source
26	MF	(Portugal) Cafú	FC Metz	Transfer	€800,000	31 May 2019	
19	GK	(Poland) Wojciech Muzyk	Olimpia Grudziądz	Transfer	€50,000	6 June 2019	
5	DF	(Poland) Igor Lewczuk	Bordeaux	Transfer	Free	12 June 2019	
8	MF	(Georgia (country)) Valerian Gvilia	FC Luzern	Transfer	€300,000	12 June 2019	
18	MF	(Lithuania) Arvydas Novikovas	Jagiellonia Białystok	Transfer	€300,000	27 June 2019	
82	MF	(Brazil) Luquinhas	CD Aves	Transfer	€400,000	4 July 2019	
37	DF	(Serbia) Ivan Obradović	RSC Anderlecht	Transfer	Free	11 July 2019	

== Competitions ==
=== Ekstraklasa ===
==== Results by round ====
Matchday	1	2	3	4	5	6	7	8	9	10	11	12	13	14	15	16	17	18	19	20	21	22	23	24	25	26	27	28	29	30
Ground	H	A	H	H	A	H	A	A	A	H	A	H	H	A	H	A	H	A	H	A	H	A	H	H	A	H	A	A	H	A
Result	L	W	D	W	W	W	D	L	W	L	L	W	W	W	W	L	W	W	W	L	W	D	W	W	W	L	W	W	W	L
Position	13	7	8	5	3	2	3	5	3	5	9	7	4	1	1	4	2	1	1	1	1	1	1	1	1	1	1	1	1	1

A = Away; H = Home; W = Win; D = Draw; L = Loss

==== Regular season ====
21 July 2019 1	Legia Warsaw	1–2	Pogoń Szczecin	Warsaw, Poland
17:30 CEST (UTC+2)	Kulenović 58'	Report	61' Buksa; 84' Kožulj	Stadium: Polish Army Stadium; Attendance: 16 787; Referee: Jarosław Przybył (Kluczbork)

28 July 2019 2	Korona Kielce	1–2	Legia Warsaw	Kielce, Poland
15:00 CEST (UTC+2)	Papadopulos 45'; Gardawski (yellow card) 56'; Márquez (yellow card) 70'	Report	Novikovas 25'; Lewczuk (yellow card) 60'; Kanté (yellow card) 74'; Astiz (yellow card) 80'; Gvilia 90+4'	Stadium: Kielce City Stadium; Attendance: 11,692; Referee: Mariusz Złotek (Stalowa Wola)

4 August 2019 3	Legia Warsaw	0–0	Śląsk Wrocław	Warsaw, Poland
17:30 CEST (UTC+2)	Martins (yellow card) 75'	Report	Mączyński (yellow card) 58'	Stadium: Polish Army Stadium; Attendance: 15,298; Referee: Paweł Gil (Lublin)

18 September 2019 4 (postponed)	Wisła Płock	1–0	Legia Warsaw	Płock, Poland
20:30 CEST (UTC+2)

18 August 2019 5	Legia Warsaw	1–0	Zagłębie Lubin	Warsaw, Poland
17:30 CEST (UTC+2)	Vešović 19'	Report	Balić (yellow card) 79'; Guldan (yellow card) 90+5'	Stadium: Polish Army Stadium; Attendance: 16,262; Referee: Piotr Lasyk (Bytom)

25 August 2019 6	ŁKS Łódź	2–3	Legia Warsaw	Łódź, Poland
20:30 CEST (UTC+2)				Attendance: 5,452

1 September 2019 7	Legia Warsaw	3–1	Raków Częstochowa	Warsaw, Poland
18:00 CEST (UTC+2)		Report		Stadium: Polish Army Stadium; Attendance: 13,084

13 September 2019 8	Jagiellonia Białystok	0–0	Legia Warsaw	Białystok, Poland
18:00 CEST (UTC+2)		Report		Attendance: 19,308

22 September 2019 9	KS Cracovia	1–2	Legia Warsaw	Kraków, Poland
20:30 CEST (UTC+2)		Report		Attendance: 13,053

28 September 2019 10	Legia Warsaw	1–2	Lechia Gdańsk	Warsaw, Poland
20:30 CEST (UTC+2)		Report		Stadium: Polish Army Stadium; Attendance: 20,000

6 October 2019 11	Piast Gliwice	2–0	Legia Warsaw	Gliwice, Poland
20:30 CEST (UTC+2)		Report		Attendance: 6,813

19 October 2019 12	Legia Warsaw	2–1	Lech Poznań	Warsaw, Poland
18:00 CEST (UTC+2)		Report		Stadium: Polish Army Stadium; Attendance: 25,401

27 October 2019 13	Legia Warsaw	7–0	Wisła Kraków	Warsaw, Poland
CEST (UTC+2)		Report		Attendance: 18,670

3 November 2019 14	Arka Gdynia	0–1	Legia Warsaw	Gdynia, Poland
CEST (UTC+2)		Report		Attendance: 7,416

9 November 2019 15	Legia Warsaw	5–1	Górnik Zabrze	Warsaw, Poland
20:30 CEST (UTC+2)		Report		Attendance: 18,445

23 November 2019 16	Pogoń Szczecin	3–1	Legia Warsaw	Szczecin, Poland
15:30 CEST (UTC+2)

30 November 2019 17	Legia Warsaw	4–0	Korona Kielce	Warsaw, Poland
20:30 CEST (UTC+2)				Stadium: Polish Army Stadium

8 December 2019 18	Śląsk Wrocław	0–3	Legia Warsaw	Wrocław, Poland
18:30 CEST (UTC+2)	Živulić (yellow card) 51'; Marković (yellow card) 87'	Report	Wszołek 14' (yellow card) 88'; Kanté 73'; Luquinhas 83'	Stadium: Stadion Miejski; Attendance: 31,819; Referee: Piotr Lasyk

14 December 2019 19	Legia Warsaw	3–1	Wisła Płock	Warsaw, Poland
21:00 CEST (UTC+2)	Niezgoda 22' 75'; Kanté 27'; Lewczuk (yellow card) 80'	Report	Dähne (yellow card) 33'; Furman 34' (pen.) (yellow card) 72'	Stadium: Polish Army Stadium; Attendance: 20,485; Referee: Jarosław Przybył

20 December 2019 20	Zagłębie Lubin	2–1	Legia Warsaw	Lubin, Poland
21:30 CEST (UTC+2)	Czerwiński (yellow card) 31'; Poręba (yellow card) 39'; Bartosz Bialek 57'; Bohar 82'; Guldan (yellow card) 90+2'	Report	André Martins (yellow card) 12'; Wieteska (yellow card) 28'; Niezgoda 32'; Kacper Kostorz (yellow card) 90+3'	Stadium: Stadion Zagłębia Lubin; Attendance: 6,063; Referee: Tomasz Musial

9 February 2020 21	Legia Warsaw	3–1	ŁKS Łódź	Warsaw, Poland
18:30 CEST (UTC+2)	Jędrzejczyk (yellow card) 34'; Lewczuk (yellow card) 56'; Rosołek 70'; Antolić 85' (pen.); Kanté 89'	Report	Piątek 53' (yellow card) 74'; Przemyslaw Sajdak (yellow card) 58'; Grzesik (yellow card) 72'; Sobociński (yellow card) 84'	Stadium: Polish Army Stadium; Attendance: 23,898; Referee: Bartosz Frankowski

15 February 2020 22	Raków Częstochowa	2–2	Legia Warsaw	Bełchatów, Poland
21:00 CEST (UTC+2)	Musiolik 22'; Schwarz 79' (pen.)	Report	Karbownik (yellow card) 34'; Luquinhas 46'; Jędrzejczyk (yellow card) 48'; Kanté 74'	Stadium: Stadion GKS; Attendance: 4,153; Referee: Piotr Lasyk

22 February 2020 23	Legia Warsaw	4–0	Jagiellonia Białystok	Warsaw, Poland
18:30 CEST (UTC+2)		Report		Stadium: Polish Army Stadium; Attendance: 17075; Referee: Mariusz Zlotek

29 February 2020 24	Legia Warsaw	2–1	KS Cracovia	Warsaw, Poland
21:00 CEST (UTC+2)		Report		Stadium: Polish Army Stadium; Attendance: 20 813; Referee: Szymon Marciniak

4 March 2020 25	Lechia Gdańsk	0–2	Legia Warsaw	Gdańsk, Poland
CEST (UTC+2)		Report		Stadium: Stadion Energa Gdańsk; Attendance: 13 055; Referee: Tomasz Musiał

7 March 2020 26	Legia Warsaw	1–2	Piast Gliwice	Warsaw, Poland
CET (UTC+2)	(red card) 10' Kanté; 12' Antolić; (yellow card) 41' Gvilia; 80' Wszołek	Report	35' Jorge Félix; 52' Badía; (yellow card) 81' Kirkeskov; (yellow card) 85' Sokołowski	Stadium: Polish Army Stadium; Attendance: 23,120; Referee: Jaroslaw Przybyl

30 May 2020 27	Lech Poznań	0–1	Legia Warsaw	Poznań, Poland
20:00 CEST (UTC+2)	Kostevych (yellow card) 32'; Jóźwiak (yellow card) 71'; Crnomarković (yellow card) 83'; Puchacz (yellow card) 90+6'	Summary	Pekhart 17'; Wieteska (yellow card) 31'; Majecki (yellow card) 81'	Stadium: INEA Stadion; Attendance: Played Without Spectators; Referee: (Poland) Tomasz Musial

7 June 2020 28	Wisła Kraków	1–3	Legia Warsaw	Kraków, Poland
17:30 CEST (UTC+2)	Burliga 29'; Zhukov (yellow card) 82'	Summary	Jędrzejczyk (yellow card) 12'; Pekhart 57' 70' (yellow card) 83'; Gvilia 76'	Stadium: Stadion Miejski im. Henryka Reymana; Attendance: Played Without Spectators; Referee: (Poland) Jarosław Przybył

10 June 2020 29	Legia Warsaw	5–1	Arka Gdynia	Warsaw, Poland
20:30 CEST (UTC+2)	Wszołek 44'; Marciniak 50' (o.g.); Luquinhas 57'; Cholewiak 62'; Sanogo 86'	Summary	Danch 1'; Vejinović (yellow card) 40'	Stadium: Legia Warsaw Municipal Stadium of Marshal Józef Piłsudski; Attendance: Played Without Spectators; Referee: (Poland) Tomasz Kwiatkowski

14 June 2020 30	Górnik Zabrze	2–0	Legia Warsaw	Zabrze, Poland
18:00 CEST (UTC+2)	Jesús Jiménez 29'; Igor Angulo 59'	Summary		Stadium: Stadion imienia Ernesta Pohla; Attendance: Played Without Spectators; Referee: (Poland) Szymon Marciniak

===== League table =====
Pos	Team	Pld	W	D	L	GF	GA	GD	Pts	Qualification
1	Legia Warsaw	30	19	3	8	63	30	+33	60	Qualification for the Championship round
2	Piast Gliwice	30	16	5	9	36	26	+10	53	Qualification for the Championship round
3	Śląsk Wrocław	30	13	10	7	42	33	+9	49 (Note: Head-to-head points: Śląsk Wrocław 4, Lech Poznań 1.)	Qualification for the Championship round
4	Lech Poznań	30	13	10	7	55	29	+26	49	Qualification for the Championship round
5	Cracovia	30	14	4	12	39	29	+10	46	Qualification for the Championship round

Source: Ekstraklasa, 90minut
Rules for classification: 1) Points; 2) Head-to-head points; 3) Head-to-head goal difference; 4) Head-to-head goals scored; 5) Head-to-head away goals scored (only if two teams); 6) Goal difference; 7) Goals scored; 8) Fairplay ranking; 9) Draw. (Note: Head-to-head record is used only after all the matches between the teams in question have been played.)

==== Championship Round ====
21 June 2020 31	Legia Warsaw	2–0	Śląsk Wrocław	Warsaw
18:30 CEST (UTC+2)	Wszołek (yellow card) 32'; Gvilia 35' 54'; Vešović (yellow card) 38'; Stolarski (yellow card) 61'	Summary	Živulić (yellow card) 37' (yellow-red card) 75'; Mączyński (yellow card) 83'; Gąska (yellow card) 89'	Stadium: Legia Warsaw Municipal Stadium of Marshal Józef Piłsudski; Attendance: 5,220; Referee: (Poland) Piotr Lasyk

24 June 2020 32	Jagiellonia Białystok	0–0	Legia Warsaw	Białystok
21:30 CEST (UTC+2)	Puljić (yellow card) 30'; Bida (yellow card) 34'; Makuszewski (yellow card) 41'; Țîru (yellow card) 65'	Summary	Slisz (yellow card) 18'; Stolarski (yellow card) 60'	Stadium: Białystok City Stadium; Attendance: 3,636; Referee: (Poland) Jarosław Przybył

27 June 2020 33	Legia Warsaw	1–1	Piast Gliwice	Warsaw
18:30 CEST (UTC+2)	Wszołek (yellow card) 45+2'; Gvilia (yellow card) 73'; Wieteska (yellow card) 82'; Rosołek 84'	Summary	Rymaniak (yellow card) 53' (yellow-red card) 55'; Jorge Félix 59' (pen.)	Stadium: Legia Warsaw Municipal Stadium of Marshal Józef Piłsudski; Attendance: 5,550; Referee: (Poland) Szymon Marciniak

4 July 2020 34	Lech Poznań	2–1	Legia Warsaw	Poznań
18:30 CEST (UTC+2)	Jóźwiak 24'; Kamiński 29'; Dani Ramírez (yellow card) 36'; Pedro Tiba (yellow card) 45+3'	Summary	Luquinhas (yellow card) 36'; Lewczuk 70'	Stadium: INEA Stadion; Attendance: 8,167; Referee: (Poland) Paweł Gil

11 July 2020 35	Legia Warsaw	2–0	Cracovia	Warsaw
18:30 CEST (UTC+2)	Pekhart 23'; Gvilia 75'	Summary		Stadium: Legia Warsaw Municipal Stadium of Marshal Józef Piłsudski; Attendance: 5500; Referee: (Poland) Jarosław Przybył

15 July 2020 36	Lechia Gdańsk	0–0	Legia Warsaw	Gdańsk
21:30 CEST (UTC+2)		Summary		Stadium: Stadion Energa Gdańsk; Attendance: 5747; Referee: (Poland) Tomasz Musiał

19 July 2020 37	Legia Warsaw	1–2	Pogoń Szczecin	Warsaw
18:30 CEST (UTC+2)				Stadium: Legia Warsaw Municipal Stadium of Marshal Józef Piłsudski

=== Polish Cup ===
25 September 2019 Round of 64	Puszcza Niepołomice	0–2	Legia Warsaw	Niepołomice, Poland

30 October 2019 Round of 32	Widzew Łódź	2–3	Legia Warsaw	Łódź, Poland
				Stadium: Stadion Widzewa; Attendance: 16,723; Referee: Szymon Marciniak

3 December 2019 Round of 16	Górnik Łęczna	0–2	Legia Warsaw	Łęczna, Poland
20:45 CET (UTC+1)		Report	40' Gvilia; 48' Kanté	Stadium: Stadion Górnika Łęczna; Attendance: 5,416; Referee: Zbigniew Dobrynin

26 May 2020 Quarter-finals	Miedź Legnica	1–2	Legia Warsaw	Legnica, Poland
20:10 CEST (UTC+2)	(yellow card) 62' Marquitos; 88' Zieliński; (yellow card) 89' Šoljić	Report	17' Gvilia; 49' Cholewiak; (red card) 83' Lewczuk	Stadium: White Eagle Stadium; Attendance: 0 Referee: Bartosz Frankowski

7 July 2020 Semi-finals	Cracovia	3–0	Legia Warsaw	Kraków, Poland
21:00 CEST (UTC+2)	Wdowiak 5' (yellow card) 45+1' (goal) 82'; Helik 14'; Fiolić (yellow card) 25'; van Amersfoort (yellow card) 65'; Thiago (yellow card) 86'; Hanca (yellow card) 90+1'; Sipľak (yellow card) 90+2'	Summary	Karbownik (yellow card) 71'; Slisz (yellow card) 90+2'; Gvilia (yellow card) 90+3'	Stadium: Marshal Józef Piłsudski Stadium; Attendance: 0 Referee: Bartosz Frankowski

=== Europa League ===
==== First qualifying round ====
11 July 2019	Europa (Gibraltar)	0–0	(Poland) Legia Warsaw	Victoria Stadium, Gibraltar
20:30	Salazar (yellow card) 62'; Yahaya (yellow card) 82'	Report		Attendance: 787; Referee: Alex Troleis (Faroe Islands)

18 July 2019	Legia Warsaw (Poland)	3–0	(Gibraltar) Europa	Polish Army Stadium, Warsaw
21:00	Carlitos 7', 60'; Kulenović 13'	Report		Attendance: 14,839; Referee: Robert Jenkins (Wales)

Legia Warsaw won 4–0 on aggregate.

==== Second qualifying round ====
25 July 2019	Legia Warsaw (Poland)	1–0	(Finland) KuPS	Polish Army Stadium, Warsaw
21:00	Wieteska 9'	Report		Attendance: 11,678; Referee: Ivan Bebek (Croatia)

1 August 2019	KuPS (Finland)	0–0	(Poland) Legia Warsaw	Kuopio Football Stadium, Kuopio
19:00		Report		Attendance: 3,200; Referee: Lawrence Visser (Belgium)

Legia Warsaw won 1–0 on aggregate.

==== Third qualifying round ====
8 August 2019	Legia Warsaw (Poland)	0–0	(Greece) Atromitos	Polish Army Stadium, Warsaw
21:00		Report		Attendance: 15,093; Referee: Manuel Schüttengruber (Austria)

14 August 2019	Atromitos (Greece)	0–2	(Poland) Legia Warsaw	Peristeri Stadium, Athens
18:00 (19:00 EEST)		Report	Stolarski 29'; Gvilia 51'	Attendance: 2,019; Referee: Bas Nijhuis (Netherlands)

Legia Warsaw won 2–0 on aggregate.

==== Play-off round ====
22 August 2019	Legia Warsaw (Poland)	0–0	(Scotland) Rangers	Polish Army Stadium, Warsaw
20:00	Martins (yellow card) 24'; Jędrzejczyk (yellow card) 39'; Stolarski (yellow card) 51'; Vešović (yellow card) 64'	Report	Flanagan (yellow card) 61'; Morelos (yellow card) 72'	Attendance: 26,665; Referee: Benoît Bastien (France)

29 August 2019	Rangers (Scotland)	1–0	(Poland) Legia Warsaw	Ibrox Stadium, Glasgow
20:45 (19:45 BST)	Barišić (yellow card) 60'; Tavernier (yellow card) 70'; Katić (yellow card) 80'; Morelos 90+1'; Jones (yellow card) 90+4'	Report	Stolarski (yellow card) 38'; Lewczuk (yellow card) 90+4'	Attendance: 45,463; Referee: Slavko Vinčić (Slovenia)

Legia Warsaw lost 0–1 on aggregate.
