= Paweł Wszołek =

Polish footballer (born 1992)

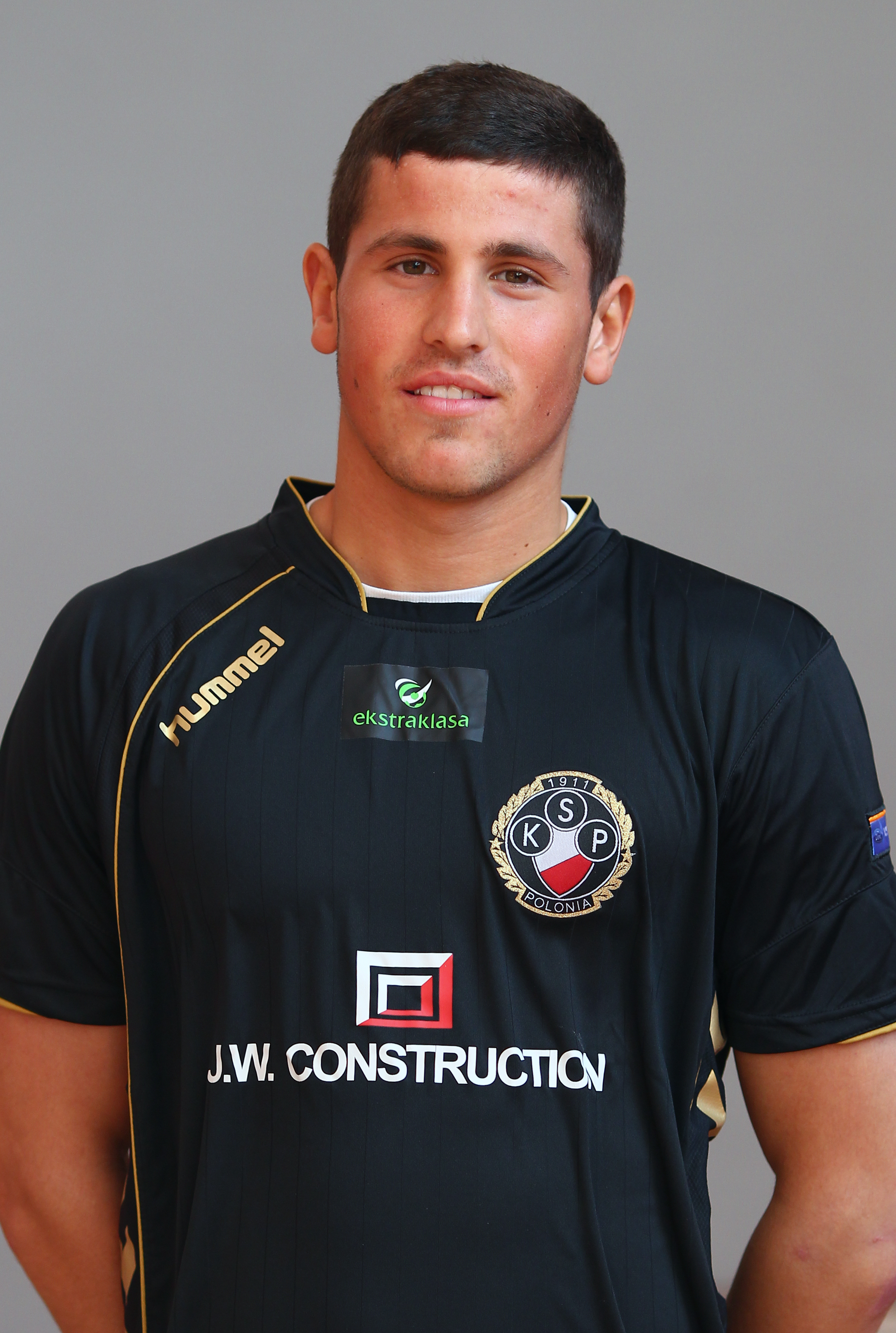
- Wszołek in 2011 with Polonia Warsaw

Personal information
- Full name: Paweł Marek Wszołek
- Date of birth: 30 April 1992 (age 34)
- Place of birth: Tczew, Poland
- Height: 1.86 m (6 ft 1 in)
- Positions: Right winger; wing-back

Team information
- Current team: Legia Warsaw
- Number: 22

Youth career
- 2001–2004: Wisła Tczew
- 2004–2005: Lechia Gdańsk
- 2005–2009: Wisła Tczew
- 2009–2010: Polonia Warsaw

Senior career*
Years	Team	Apps	(Gls)
2010–2013	Polonia Warsaw	60	(9)
2013–2016	Sampdoria	27	(1)
2015–2016	→ Hellas Verona (loan)	26	(0)
2016–2017	Hellas Verona	0	(0)
2016–2017	→ Queens Park Rangers (loan)	16	(3)
2017–2019	Queens Park Rangers	87	(6)
2019–2021	Legia Warsaw	49	(9)
2021–2022	Union Berlin	0	(0)
2022	→ Legia Warsaw (loan)	14	(6)
2022–	Legia Warsaw	117	(16)

International career^{‡}
- Poland U17
2009–2010	Poland U18		
2010–2011	Poland U19	8	(0)
2011–2012	Poland U20	4	(1)
2011–2014	Poland U21	11	(2)
2012–	Poland	20	(3)
- * Club domestic league appearances and goals as of 20:30, 29 May 2026 (UTC) ‡ National team caps and goals as of 22:50, 17 November 2025 (UTC)

Paweł Marek Wszołek (Polish pronunciation: [ˈpavɛw ˈfʂɔwɛk]; born 30 April 1992) is a Polish professional footballer who plays as a right winger or wing-back for Ekstraklasa club Legia Warsaw.

== Club career ==
=== Polonia Warsaw ===
Born in Tczew, Poland, Wszołek played at the academies of Wisła Tczew, Lechia Gdańsk and re-joining Wisła Tczew before he left for Polonia Warsaw in the summer of 2009. As a result of joining the academies, Wszołek had to relocate and while at Lechia Gdańsk, he once lived in the dormitory for a month before moving with his mother. Because of this, his family had a financial problem, leading to his mother taking out loan money and once spend the loan money to buy him a car. In the end, as his career progressed, Wszołek helped his mother to pay all the debt and in return, he bought his mother a new apartment.

Wszołek made his senior team debut for Polonia Warsaw on 13 November 2010, coming on as a substitute in the second half, in a 3–1 win over Ruch Chorzów. Wszołek went on to finish the 2011–12 season, making seven appearances.

The 2011–12 season saw Wszołek established himself in the first team and made his first appearance of the season, in the opening game of the season, where he came on as a substitute in the second half and set up a goal for Bruno Coutinho to score the only goal in the game, in a 1–0 win over Lechia Gdańsk. Then on 18 September 2011, Wszołek set up the opener for Tomasz Jodłowiec against Legia Warsaw in the Warsaw derby, in a 2–1 win for Polonia Warsaw. Three days later, on 21 September 2013, Wszołek scored and set up one of the three goals, in a 4–0 win over Ruch Radzionków. It wasn't until on 12 March 2012 when he scored his league goal, in a 4–1 win over Jagiellonia Białystok. Then on 1 April 2012, he set up two goals, in a 3–0 win over Śląsk Wrocław. In the last game of the season, Wszołek scored his second goal for the club, in a 1–1 draw against Podbeskidzie Bielsko-Biała. Wszołek finished the 2011–12 season, making twenty-eight appearances and scoring three times in all competitions.

In the 2012–13 season, Wszołek started the season well when he scored eight goals in the all competition against Miedź Legnica (in which he scored a brace), Lechia Gdańsk (in which he was named Team of the Week Matchday 1) Wisła Kraków (in which he was named Team of the Week Matchday 3), Widzew Łódź, Zagłębie Lubin, Śląsk Wrocław and Bełchatów (in which he was named Team of the Week Matchday 9). In the January transfer window, Wszołek began to attract interest from Serie A clubs and Bundesliga side Schalke and Hannover 96, in which he almost left the club to join them. However, the move collapsed after he failed to show up for the medical. Despite this, Wszołek stayed at the club and continued to be a regular for the rest of the season, scoring two more league goals against Ruch Chorzow and Podbeskidzie. Wszołek went on to finish the 2012–13 season, making twenty-nine appearances and scoring ten times in all competition.

As the 2012–13 season was almost came to an end, Wszołek expressed his desire to leave the club when he filed a request the Polish Football Association to terminate his contract at Polonia Warsaw. It was reported on 6 June 2013 that Wszołek had his contract terminated at the club following an intervention from the Polish Football Association.

=== Sampdoria ===
Following the expiry of his contract, Wszołek was linked with a move to Sampdoria and Lech Poznań. Wszołek was expected to be a Sampdoria player on 15 June 2013. However, the move appeared to be uncertain after it has been revealed that Wszołek had yet sign a contract with Sampdoria. After a much confusion, it was finally announced on 9 July 2013 that Wszołek joined Italian Serie A side Sampdoria, signing a four-year contract.

After appearing the first two matches as an unused substitute, Wszołek finally made his Sampdoria debut, where he made his first start and played for 56 minutes before being substituted, in a 2–2 draw against Cagliari. However, throughout the 2013–14 season, Wszołek struggled in the Sampdoria's first team after struggled with language barrier, as he appeared in a few start and spent most of the season on the substitute, making nineteen appearances (making ten starts) in all competition. Despite this, Wszołek scored his first goal for the club on 11 May 2014, in a 5–2 loss against Napoli.

The 2014–15 season saw Wszołek's first team chance even limited at Sampdoria and was given an opportunity to join Bologna in the summer transfer window, but it never happened. To make the matter worst, Wszołek suffered an injury that kept him out throughout 2014. Though he was told by the club that he was set to be loaned out, with clubs like Mouscron and Pescara, Wszołek's departure never happened and stayed at the club for the rest of the season. Nevertheless, Wszołek made his first appearance on 5 January 2015, making his first start before coming off in the second half, in a 3–0 loss against Lazio. In a match against Udinese on 10 May 2015, Wszołek set up one of the four goals, in a 4–0 win. Wszołek finished the season, making seven appearances in all competition.

=== Hellas Verona ===
Although he played four times at the start of the season for Sampdoria, the club agreed to loan out Wszołek to fellow Serie A side Hellas Verona for the rest of the season on 31 August 2015.

After appearing on the substitute for the first three matches since joining Hellas Verona, Wszołek made his debut for the club, coming on as a substitute, playing 35 minutes, in a 2–1 loss against Lazio on 27 September 2015. Wszołek set up a goal for Luca Toni, in a 1–1 draw against Sassuolo on 20 December 2015 and four weeks later on 17 January 2016, he set up another goal for Giampaolo Pazzini, in a 1–1 draw against Roma. However, the season was a miserable one for the Mastini, as the team failed to win a game until the 23rd week of the season, defeating Atalanta 2–1, on 3 February 2016, a game in which Wszołek started, as well as, setting up both of the goals. They were subsequently relegated to Serie B. In the last game of the season, Wszołek received a straight red in the 35th minute, in a 3–2 loss against Palermo. After being initially banned for three matches, his suspension was reduced to a one match ban.

On 1 July 2016, Wszołek sealed his permanent move from Sampdoria in a deal worth in the region of £1.25m. Wszołek made one appearance for the club, coming on as a late substitute, in a 1–0 win over Crotone.

==== Queens Park Rangers (loan) ====
Wszołek moved to Championship side Queens Park Rangers on transfer deadline day, 31 August 2016, on a season-long loan deal. This was made into a permanent deal on transfer deadline day 31 January 2017 when Queens Park Rangers exercised a clause in the loan deal to sign Wszolek until the summer of 2019.

Wszołek made his Queens Park Rangers debut, where he made his first start and played for 72 minutes in the game before being substituted, in a 6–0 loss against Newcastle United. In the West London derby against Fulham on 1 October 2016, Wszołek set up an opening goal for Conor Washington to score his first goal for the club, in a 2–1 win. In the next game, he scored his first goal, in a 1–1 draw against Reading on 15 October 2016. Wszołek then set up the opener and scored the winning goal on 31 December 2016, in a 2–1 win over Wolverhampton Wanderers, followed up by scoring the winning goal again, in a 2–1 win over Ipswich Town on 2 January 2017.

=== Queens Park Rangers ===
On 31 January 2017, halfway through Wszołek's initial loan QPR exercised an option to sign him permanently for an undisclosed fee. Wszołek finished the 2018–19 season with 38 appearances in the league, his most in his three seasons at the club, highlighted by a 17-game stretch across the new year period in which he started every game on the right wing and scored all 4 of his goals on the season.

=== Legia Warsaw ===
On 19 September 2019, Wszołek signed with Polish club Legia Warsaw, marking his return to his native country after seven years abroad. He came off the bench for his debut on 6 October in a 2–0 defeat to reigning champions Piast Gliwice. Wszołek entered the starting lineup following the succeeding international break, and scored his first goal for the club in their 7–0 thrashing of Wisła Kraków on 27 October.

=== Union Berlin ===
In the summer of 2021, Wszołek joined Union Berlin. He made just one appearance in a 3–1 DFB-Pokal win over Waldhof Mannheim.

==== Legia Warsaw (loan) ====
On 27 January 2022, he joined Ekstraklasa side Legia Warsaw on loan for the remainder of the 2021–22 season. Legia were struggling in a relegation battle at the bottom of the table. He scored his first goal for Legia in a 3–1 against Zagłębie Lubin. Wszołek finished the season with 6 goals and 3 assists, and was crucial to Legia’s survival.

=== Return to Legia Warsaw ===
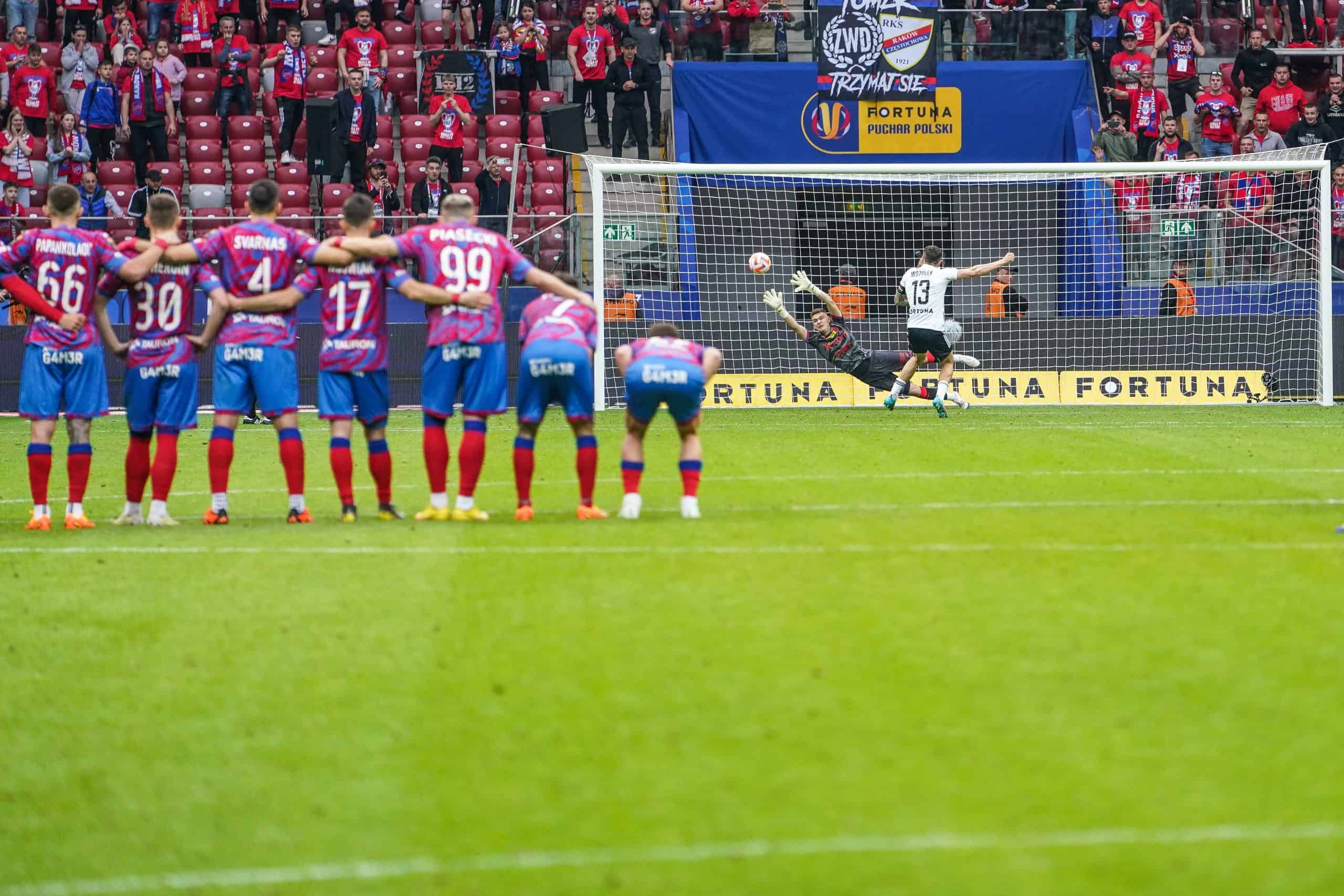
Wszołek taking a penalty for Legia Warsaw during the 2022–23 Polish Cup final penalty shoot-out against Raków Częstochowa

On 7 July 2022, Legia announced the permanent signing of Wszołek on a three-year deal until the end of the 2024–25 season, after a successful loan spell.

== International career ==
Wszołek played for the Poland national under-19 football team. In September 2012, Wszołek was called up by the senior national team for the first time. Upon learning of being called up, Wszołek said it was a dream come true for him to be called up.

Wszołek debuted for the Poland national football team on 12 October 2012 in a friendly match against South Africa, which saw Poland win 1–0. In his eighth appearance for the national side against Finland on 26 March 2016, Wszołek scored his first goals, in a 5–0 win. After the match, Wszołek said scoring two goals against Finland was "the best time of his career". On 12 May 2016, Wszołek was called by the national team for the UEFA Euro 2016 preliminary squad. However, Wszołek suffered an elbow injury during a training with the national squad, putting his hopes of being included in the Poland squad in doubt. Following this, it was announced that Wszołek would be cut from the squad because of the injury and would be out for three months after having a surgery.

It wasn't until on 10 October 2016 when Wszołek made his first appearance for Poland since being cut from squad for UEFA Euro 2016, where he came on as a substitute for injured Artur Jędrzejczyk, in a 2–1 win over Armenia.

== Personal life ==
Wszołek was once convicted after he drove his BMW without a driving license and was late for training. In addition, Wszołek struggled in school, as he was missed regularly and was urged by his mother not to quit school; leading him to take an evening course.

In addition to speaking Polish, Wszołek speaks German (having studied it from school), Italian (having learn to adapt from it) and currently learning English.

== Career statistics ==
=== Club ===
As of match played 1 May 2026

Appearances and goals by club, season and competition
Club	Season	League			National cup (Note: Includes Polish Cup, Coppa Italia, FA Cup, DFB-Pokal)		Europe		Other		Total	
Club	Season	Division	Apps	Goals	Apps	Goals	Apps	Goals	Apps	Goals	Apps	Goals
Polonia Warsaw	2010–11	Ekstraklasa	7	0	0	0	—		—		7	0
Polonia Warsaw	2011–12	Ekstraklasa	26	2	2	1	—		—		28	3
Polonia Warsaw	2012–13	Ekstraklasa	27	7	2	3	—		—		29	10
Polonia Warsaw	Total		60	9	4	4	—		—		64	13
Sampdoria	2013–14	Serie A	19	1	2	0	—		—		21	1
Sampdoria	2014–15	Serie A	6	0	1	0	—		—		7	0
Sampdoria	2015–16	Serie A	2	0	0	0	2 (Note: Appearances in UEFA Europa League)	0	—		4	0
Sampdoria	Total		27	1	3	0	2	0	—		32	1
Hellas Verona	2015–16	Serie A	26	0	1	0	—		—		27	0
Hellas Verona	2016–17	Serie B	0	0	1	0	—		—		1	0
Hellas Verona	Total		26	0	2	0	—		—		28	0
Queens Park Rangers	2016–17	Championship	29	3	1	0	—		1 (Note: Appearance(s) in EFL Cup)	0	31	3
Queens Park Rangers	2017–18	Championship	36	2	1	0	—		1	0	38	2
Queens Park Rangers	2018–19	Championship	38	4	3	0	—		3	2	44	6
Queens Park Rangers	Total		103	9	5	0	—		5	2	113	11
Legia Warsaw	2019–20	Ekstraklasa	25	6	4	1	—		—		29	7
Legia Warsaw	2020–21	Ekstraklasa	24	3	3	1	3 (Note: One appearance in UEFA Champions League, two appearances and one goal in UEFA Europa League)	1	1 (Note: Appearance in Polish Super Cup)	0	31	5
Legia Warsaw	Total		49	9	7	2	3	1	1	0	60	12
Union Berlin	2021–22	Bundesliga	0	0	1	0	—		—		1	0
Legia Warsaw (loan)	2021–22	Ekstraklasa	14	6	1	0	—		—		15	6
Legia Warsaw	2022–23	Ekstraklasa	34	7	6	0	—		—		40	7
Legia Warsaw	2023–24	Ekstraklasa	28	4	2	0	14 (Note: Appearances in UEFA Conference League)	2	1	1	45	6
Legia Warsaw	2024–25	Ekstraklasa	30	3	5	1	14	2	—		49	6
Legia Warsaw	2025–26	Ekstraklasa	25	2	1	0	12 (Note: Six appearances in UEFA Europa League, six appearances and one goal in UEFA Conference League)	1	1	1	39	4
Legia Warsaw	Total		131	22	15	1	40	5	2	1	188	29
Career total			396	50	37	7	45	6	8	3	486	66

=== International ===
As of match played 17 November 2025

Appearances and goals by national team and year
National team	Year	Apps	Goals
Poland	2012	3	0
Poland	2013	3	0
Poland	2014	1	0
Poland	2016	3	2
Poland	2017	1	0
Poland	2023	3	0
Poland	2025	6	1
Total		20	3

Scores and results list Poland's goal tally first, score column indicates score after each Wszołek goal.

List of international goals scored by Paweł Wszołek
No.	Date	Venue	Opponent	Score	Result	Competition
1	26 March 2016	Wrocław Stadium, Wrocław, Poland	Finland	2–0	5–0	Friendly
2	26 March 2016	Wrocław Stadium, Wrocław, Poland	Finland	4–0	5–0	Friendly
3	17 November 2025	Grawnd Nazzjonali, Ta' Qali, Malta	Malta	2–1	3–2	2026 FIFA World Cup qualification

== Honours ==
Legia Warsaw

- Ekstraklasa: 2019–20, 2020–21
- Polish Cup: 2022–23, 2024–25
- Polish Super Cup: 2023, 2025
