= Wojciech Muzyk =

Polish footballer

Personal information
- Date of birth: 7 November 2000 (age 25)
- Place of birth: Suwałki, Poland
- Height: 1.95 m (6 ft 5 in)
- Position: Goalkeeper

Team information
- Current team: Legia Warsaw U15 (goalkeeping coach)

Youth career
- –2015: Czarni Olecko

Senior career*
Years	Team	Apps	(Gls)
2015	Czarni Olecko	12	(0)
2015–2017	Mazur Ełk	27	(0)
2017–2019	Olimpia Grudziądz	30	(0)
2019–2022	Legia Warsaw II	10	(0)
2019–2022	Legia Warsaw	1	(0)
2022–2023	Siarka Tarnobrzeg	18	(0)
2024	Stal Stalowa Wola	2	(0)
2024–2025	Hutnik Warsaw	16	(0)
2025	Błonianka Błonie	0	(0)
Total		116	(0)
- * Club domestic league appearances and goals

Wojciech Muzyk (born 7 November 1998) is a Polish former professional footballer who played as a goalkeeper. He is currently the goalkeeping coach of Legia Warsaw's under-15 team.

== Club career ==
=== Early career ===
Born in Suwałki, Poland, Muzyk is a youth product of Czarni Olecko. He also represented Mazur Ełk and Olimpia Grudziądz in his early career.

=== Legia Warsaw ===
In June 2019, he signed his contract with Legia Warsaw. He mainly played for the club's third-league reserves.

On 4 July 2020, he made his Ekstraklasa debut in a 1–2 away defeat against Lech Poznań.

In November 2020, it was reported that he had health problems, through which he underwent back surgery. He returned to training in early 2021. In June 2022, he was on trial at Zagłębie Sosnowiec.

=== Siarka Tarnobrzeg ===
In September 2023, Muzyk left Legia for II liga club Siarka Tarnobrzeg. He was part of the Siarka team that suffered relegation to III liga.

=== Stal Stalowa Wola ===
On 29 January 2024, Muzyk joined II liga side Stal Stalowa Wola. He made his debut for the club on 17 March 2024, playing the full match in a 0–1 loss to KKS 1925 Kalisz. He left the club at the end of his contract in June.

=== Hutnik Warsaw ===
On 14 July 2024, Muzyk signed a one-year contract with IV liga Masovia club Hutnik Warsaw. In January 2025, Muzyk retired from professional football due to prolonged injury issues.

== Coaching career ==
In January 2025, shortly after terminating his deal with Hutnik, Muzyk was appointed as goalkeeping coach at Błonianka Błonie. In 2026, he was employed by Legia Warsaw to join their under-15 team's staff.

== Career statistics ==
Appearances and goals by club, season and competition
Club	Season	League			Polish Cup		Other		Total	
Club	Season	Division	Apps	Goals	Apps	Goals	Apps	Goals	Apps	Goals
Czarni Olecko	2014–15	Regional league	12	0	—		—		12	0
Mazur Ełk	2015–16	III liga, group B	14	0	—		—		14	0
Mazur Ełk	2016–17	III liga, group I	13	0	—		—		13	0
Mazur Ełk	Total		27	0	—		—		27	0
Olimpia Grudziądz	2016–17	I liga	0	0	—		—		0	0
Olimpia Grudziądz	2017–18	I liga	1	0	0	0	—		1	0
Olimpia Grudziądz	2018–19	II liga	29	0	0	0	—		29	0
Olimpia Grudziądz	Total		30	0	0	0	—		30	0
Legia Warsaw II	2019–20	III liga, group I	10	0	—		—		10	0
Legia Warsaw	2019–20	Ekstraklasa	1	0	2	0	—		3	0
Legia Warsaw	2020–21	Ekstraklasa	0	0	0	0	0	0	0	0
Legia Warsaw	2021–22	Ekstraklasa	0	0	0	0	0	0	0	0
Legia Warsaw	Total		1	0	2	0	0	0	3	0
Siarka Tarnobrzeg	2022–23	II liga	18	0	0	0	0	0	0	0
Stal Stalowa Wola	2023–24	II liga	2	0	—		0	0	2	0
Hutnik Warsaw	2024–25	IV liga Masovia	16	0	—		—		16	0
Błonianka Błonie	2025–26	IV liga Masovia	0	0	—		—		0	0
Career total			116	0	2	0	0	0	118	0

== Honours ==
Legia Warsaw

- Ekstraklasa: 2019–20
