= Vamara Sanogo =

French footballer (born 1995)

Personal information
- Date of birth: 22 April 1995 (age 31)
- Place of birth: Saint-Denis, France
- Height: 1.86 m (6 ft 1 in)
- Position: Striker

Team information
- Current team: Caronnese

Senior career*
Years	Team	Apps	(Gls)
2012–2015	Metz B	3	(0)
2015–2016	Fleetwood Town	1	(0)
2016	→ Nuneaton Town (loan)	7	(1)
2016–2017	Zagłębie Sosnowiec	15	(5)
2017–2020	Legia Warsaw	2	(1)
2017–2019	→ Zagłębie Sosnowiec (loan)	54	(16)
2021	Dinamo Batumi	9	(0)
2021–2022	Górnik Zabrze	8	(0)
2022	Zagłębie Sosnowiec	10	(1)
2022–2023	Kafr Qasim	8	(1)
2023	Marsaxlokk	6	(0)
2024–	Caronnese	0	(0)
- * Club domestic league appearances and goals as of 13 January 2024

Vamara Sanogo (born 22 April 1995) is a French professional footballer who plays as a forward for Italian Serie D club Caronnese.

== Career ==
After playing for Metz B, Sanogo signed for English club Fleetwood Town in May 2015. He moved on loan to Nuneaton Town in March 2016, before signing for Polish club Zagłębie Sosnowiec in August 2016. On 21 January 2017, he signed a four-and-a-half-year deal with Legia Warsaw. He returned to Zagłębie Sosnowiec on loan in August 2017. On 18 December 2020, his contract with Legia was terminated.

In January 2021 he signed for Georgian club Dinamo Batumi. He started the 2021–22 season with Górnik Zabrze, before rejoining Zagłębie Sosnowiec on 4 February 2022. He left the club by mutual consent on 14 June 2022.

On 18 July 2022 he signed for F.C. Kafr Qasim. He then played in Malta for Marsaxlokk and in Italy for Caronnese.

== Personal life ==
Born in France, Sanogo is of Ivorian descent.

== Career statistics ==
As of 25 April 2024

Appearances and goals by club, season and competition
Club	Season	League			National cup (Note: Includes Georgian Cup, Polish Cup, Israel State Cup, Maltese FA Trophy)		League cup (Note: Includes EFL Cup)		Other		Total	
Club	Season	Division	Apps	Goals	Apps	Goals	Apps	Goals	Apps	Goals	Apps	Goals
Metz B	2012–13	Championnat National 2	2	0	0	0	0	0	0	0	2	0
Metz B	2013–14	Championnat National 3	1	0	0	0	0	0	0	0	1	0
Metz B	2014–15	Championnat National 3	0	0	0	0	0	0	0	0	0	0
Metz B	Total		3	0	0	0	0	0	0	0	3	0
Fleetwood Town	2015–16	EFL League One	1	0	0	0	1	0	0	0	2	0
Nuneaton Town (loan)	2015–16	National League North	7	1	0	0	0	0	0	0	7	1
Zagłębie Sosnowiec	2016–17	I liga	15	5	0	0	—		—		15	5
Legia Warsaw	2016–17	Ekstraklasa	0	0	0	0	—		—		0	0
Legia Warsaw	2017–18	Ekstraklasa	0	0	0	0	—		1 (Note: Appearance in Polish Super Cup)	0	1	0
Legia Warsaw	2019–20	Ekstraklasa	2	1	0	0	—		1 (Note: Appearance in UEFA Europa League)	0	3	1
Legia Warsaw	2020–21	Ekstraklasa	0	0	0	0	—		0	0	0	0
Legia Warsaw	Total		2	1	0	0	—		2	0	4	1
Zagłębie Sosnowiec (loan)	2017–18	I liga	25	5	0	0	—		—		25	5
Zagłębie Sosnowiec (loan)	2018–19	Ekstraklasa	29	11	0	0	—		—		29	11
Zagłębie Sosnowiec (loan)	Total		54	16	0	0	0	0	0	0	54	16
Dinamo Batumi	2021	Erovnuli Liga	9	0	1	1	—		3	1	13	2
Górnik Zabrze	2021–22	Ekstraklasa	8	0	2	1	—		—		10	1
Zagłębie Sosnowiec	2021–22	I liga	10	1	0	0	—		—		10	1
Kafr Qasim	2022–23	Liga Leumit	8	1	1	0	—		0	0	9	1
Marsaxlokk	2022–23	Maltese Premier League	6	0	2	0	—		0	0	8	0
Career total			122	25	6	2	1	0	4	1	133	28

== Honours ==
Legia Warsaw

- Ekstraklasa: 2019–20
