= Luquinhas =

Brazilian footballer

Personal information
- Full name: Lucas Lima Linhares
- Date of birth: 28 September 1996 (age 30)
- Place of birth: Ceilândia, Brazil
- Height: 1.69 m (5 ft 7 in)
- Positions: Attacking midfielder; winger

Team information
- Current team: Radomiak Radom
- Number: 82

Youth career
- 2014: Ceilandense
- 2014–2015: Vilafranquense

Senior career*
Years	Team	Apps	(Gls)
2015–2016	Vilafranquense	36	(17)
2016–2017	→ Benfica B (loan)	14	(0)
2017	Benfica	0	(0)
2017–2019	Aves	17	(0)
2017–2018	→ Vilafranquense (loan)	32	(10)
2019–2022	Legia Warsaw	75	(8)
2022–2023	New York Red Bulls	56	(8)
2024–2025	Fortaleza	3	(0)
2024–2025	→ Legia Warsaw (loan)	28	(6)
2025–2026	Santa Clara	9	(0)
2026–	Radomiak Radom	16	(1)
- * Club domestic league appearances and goals as of 22:45, 29 May 2026 (UTC)

Lucas Lima Linhares (born 28 September 1996), known as Luquinhas, is a Brazilian professional footballer who plays as an attacking midfielder or winger for Ekstraklasa club Radomiak Radom.

== Career ==
=== Benfica ===
Born in Ceilândia, Luquinhas started his football career at local club Atlético Ceilandense. In September 2014, he moved to Portugal and joined Vilafranquense before moving on loan to Portuguese champions S.L. Benfica in June 2016. On 11 September, he made his professional debut with Benfica's reserve team as a substitute in a 2–1 home win over Académico de Viseu in LigaPro. After playing 15 matches with Benfica B, Luquinhas signed a four-year contract with Benfica on 28 June 2017.

=== Aves ===
On 25 August 2017 Luquinhas penned a three-year deal with Desportivo das Aves, who loaned him out for one season to Vilafranquense three days later. After one season on loan with Vilafranquense, in which he scored 10 goals in 32 league matches, Luquinhas returned to Aves. On 20 January 2019, he made his debut for Aves in a 2–1 win over Vitória de Setúbal in the Primeira Liga.

=== Legia Warsaw ===
On 4 July 2019, Luquinhas signed a three-year contract with Polish club Legia Warsaw. On 21 July, he made his debut with Legia as a starter in a 1–2 defeat to Pogoń Szczecin. On 27 October, Luquinhas scored his first goal with Legia Warsaw in a 7–0 victory over Wisła Kraków. He ended his first season in Poland appearing in 45 matches scoring 5 goals and recording 9 assists, helping Legia to a league title.

Luquinhas continued to be an important player for Legia during the 2020–21 season. On 6 February 2021, he scored his first goal of the campaign in a 2–0 victory over Raków Częstochowa. A few days later, on 9 February, Luquinhas helped Legia to a 3–2 victory over ŁKS Łódź. Luquinhas came on in the second half, scoring his club's second goal, as they advanced in the Polish Cup. He ended the season appearing in 34 matches scoring 4 goals and recording 8 assists, as Legia won its second straight Ekstraklasa title. For his efforts, he was named the Ekstraklasa Midfielder of the Season.

On 7 July 2021, Luquinhas opened the scoring for the Polish champions in a 3–2 victory over Norwegian side Bodø/Glimt in the first leg of the first round of UEFA Champions League qualifying. On 14 July, he helped Legia advance in the competition, scoring the opening goal in a 2–0 victory in the second leg against Bodø/Glimt. On 12 December 2021, he was one of the victims of Legia pseudo-fans attacking players returning to Warsaw after a match against Wisła Płock. Luquinhas himself was said to be frightened and not confident after the incident. His agent suggested the possibility of terminating his contract with the team.

=== New York Red Bulls ===
On 16 February 2022, Luquinhas signed with Major League Soccer side New York Red Bulls on a three-year deal. Luquinhas made his debut off the bench for his new club on 13 March, in a 0–1 loss versus Minnesota United FC. On 24 April 2022, Luquinhas scored his first goal for New York in a 3–0 victory over Orlando City SC. On 10 May 2022, Luquinhas scored and assisted on another goal for New York in a 3–0 victory over DC United, helping the club advance to Round of 16 in the 2022 U.S. Open Cup. A few days later, on 14 May, he scored a second half equalizer, helping New York to a 1–1 draw on the road against Philadelphia Union. On 28 May 22, Luquinhas scored two goals to help lead New York to a 4–1 victory over rival D.C. United. On 22 June 2022, Luquinhas helped New York to advance to the semifinals of the 2022 U.S. Open Cup, scoring a goal in a 3–0 victory over local rival New York City FC.

On 18 March 2023, Luquinhas scored his first goal of the season, scoring the opening goal for New York in a 2–1 victory over Columbus Crew. On 7 October 2023, Luquinhas scored two goals for New York in a 3–0 victory over Toronto FC.

=== Fortaleza ===
On 12 January 2024, Luquinhas returned to Brazil, signing a four-year contract, with an option for a further year, with Série A club Fortaleza. New York Red Bulls received a $1.5 million transfer fee, which could rise to $2 million with add-ons.

==== Loan to Legia ====
Ahead of the 2024–25 season, Luquinhas returned to Ekstraklasa club Legia Warsaw on a season-long loan; he previously played for Legia from 2019 to 2022. On 7 November 2024, Luquinhas scored his first two goals of the season in a 4–0 victory over Dinamo Minsk in a UEFA Conference League game. Luquinhas found the net on 2 May 2025, as Legia Warszawa defeated Pogoń Szczecin to win the Polish Cup.

=== Santa Clara ===
On 1 September 2025, Luquinhas signed a two-year deal with Portuguese club Santa Clara. He made his Santa Clara debut against Benfica in a 1–1 draw, playing nine minutes.

=== Radomiak Radom ===
On 13 January 2026, Luquinhas returned to Poland, joining Ekstraklasa club Radomiak Radom on a contract until June 2027.

== Career statistics ==
As of match played 23 May 2026

Appearances and goals by club, season and competition
Club	Season	League			State league		National cup (Note: Includes Taça de Portugal, Polish Cup, U.S. Open Cup)		Continental		Other		Total	
Club	Season	Division	Apps	Goals	Apps	Goals	Apps	Goals	Apps	Goals	Apps	Goals	Apps	Goals
Vilafranquense	2014–15	AF Lisboa 1ª Divisão	10	3	—		—		—		—		10	3
Vilafranquense	2014–15	AF Lisboa 1ª Divisão	26	14	—		3	1	—		1 (Note: Appearance(s) in AF Lisboa play-offs)	0	30	15
Vilafranquense	Total		36	17	—		3	1	—		1	0	40	18
Benfica B	2016–17	LigaPro	14	0	—		0	0	—		—		14	0
Vilafranquense	2017–18	Campeonato de Portugal	32	10	—		1	1	—		—		33	11
Aves	2018–19	Primeira Liga	17	0	—		1	0	—		—		18	0
Legia Warsaw	2019–20	Ekstraklasa	35	5	—		5	0	5 (Note: Appearance(s) in UEFA Europa League)	0	—		45	5
Legia Warsaw	2020–21	Ekstraklasa	25	3	—		4	1	4 (Note: Two appearances in UEFA Champions League, two appearances in UEFA Europa League)	0	1 (Note: Appearance(s) in Polish Super Cup)	0	34	4
Legia Warsaw	2021–22	Ekstraklasa	15	0	—		2	1	13 (Note: Six appearances and two goals in UEFA Champions League, seven appearances in UEFA Europa League)	2	1	0	31	3
Legia Warsaw	Total		75	8	—		11	2	22	2	2	0	110	12
New York Red Bulls	2022	Major League Soccer	30	5	—		5	2	—		1 (Note: Appearance(s) in MLS Cup Playoffs)	0	36	7
New York Red Bulls	2023	Major League Soccer	26	3	—		1	0	4 (Note: Appearance(s) in Leagues Cup)	0	3	0	34	3
New York Red Bulls	Total		56	8	—		6	2	4	0	4	0	70	10
Fortaleza	2024	Série A	0	0	3	0	0	0	1 (Note: Appearance(s) in Copa Sudamericana)	0	6 (Note: Appearance(s) in Copa do Nordeste)	0	10	0
Legia Warsaw (loan)	2024–25	Ekstraklasa	28	6	—		4	2	14 (Note: Appearance(s) in UEFA Conference League)	5	—		46	13
Santa Clara	2025–26	Primeira Liga	9	0	—		3	0	—		1 (Note: Appearance in Taça da Liga)	0	13	0
Radomiak Radom	2025–26	Ekstraklasa	16	1	—		—		—		—		16	1
Career total			283	50	3	0	29	8	41	7	14	0	370	65

== Honours ==
Legia Warsaw

- Ekstraklasa: 2019–20, 2020–21
- Polish Cup: 2024–25

Fortaleza

- Copa do Nordeste: 2024

Individual

- Ekstraklasa Midfielder of the Season: 2020–21
