= Tomáš Pekhart =

Czech footballer (born 1989)

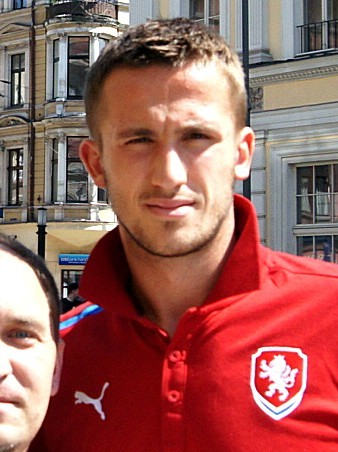
- Pekhart in 2012

Personal information
- Full name: Tomáš Pekhart
- Date of birth: 26 May 1989 (age 37)
- Place of birth: Sušice, Czechoslovakia
- Height: 1.94 m (6 ft 4 in)
- Position: Forward

Youth career
- 2001–2002: TJ Sušice
- 2002–2003: TJ Klatovy
- 2003–2006: Slavia Prague
- 2006–2008: Tottenham Hotspur

Senior career*
Years	Team	Apps	(Gls)
2008–2010	Tottenham Hotspur	0	(0)
2008	→ Southampton (loan)	9	(1)
2009	→ Slavia Prague (loan)	13	(2)
2010–2011	Jablonec	29	(15)
2011	→ Sparta Prague (loan)	9	(7)
2011–2014	1. FC Nürnberg	88	(14)
2014–2016	Ingolstadt	16	(0)
2016–2017	AEK Athens	40	(12)
2017–2018	Hapoel Be'er Sheva	28	(10)
2018–2020	Las Palmas	31	(6)
2020–2022	Legia Warsaw	67	(36)
2022	Gaziantep	12	(1)
2023–2025	Legia Warsaw	53	(14)
2025–2026	Dukla Prague	10	(0)

International career^{‡}
2004–2005	Czech Republic U16	8	(2)
2005–2006	Czech Republic U17	18	(7)
2006	Czech Republic U18	2	(0)
2007–2009	Czech Republic U20	12	(2)
2007–2011	Czech Republic U21	26	(17)
2010–2022	Czech Republic	26	(2)
Medal record
Men's football
Representing Czech Republic
FIFA U-20 World Cup
Runner-up	2007 Canada
UEFA European Under-17 Championship
Runner-up	2006 Luxembourg
- * Club domestic league appearances and goals as of 15 May 2026 ‡ National team caps and goals as of 30 June 2022

Tomáš Pekhart (born 26 May 1989) is a Czech former footballer who last played as a forward for Czech First League club Dukla Prague. He represented the Czech Republic at both junior and senior level.

== Club career ==
=== Early career ===
Born in Sušice, Czechoslovakia, he began his youth career with his hometown club TJ Sušice and also played for TJ Klatovy before joining Slavia Prague in 2003.

Pekhart joined the Tottenham Hotspur youth academy during the summer of 2006.

==== Loan to Southampton ====
In August 2008, Pekhart joined Championship side Southampton on loan until January 2009. He made his first league appearance as a substitute on 14 September, away against Queens Park Rangers which Southampton lost 4–1. He scored his only league goal for Southampton in a 2–2 home draw against Ipswich.

==== Loan to Slavia Prague ====
He returned to Spurs in January 2009 and on transfer deadline day Pekhart returned to his old club Slavia Prague on a year-long loan until January 2010. On 15 March 2009, Pekhart scored a late goal for Slavia in a 2–1 victory over FK Jablonec. Pekhart was rewarded for his first goal with the club and was handed a start on 22 March, scoring the lone goal in the 1–0 victory over FC Zlín.

=== FK Jablonec ===
On 12 January 2010, FK Jablonec confirmed the signing of Pekhart on a three-and-a-half-year deal for an undisclosed fee. On 20 March 2010, Pekhart scored his first goal for Jablonec, a late winner in a 2–1 victory over Příbram. On 2 May 2010, Pekhart scored two goals in a 4–0 victory over Bohemians 1905. On 8 May 2010, Pekhart scored the opening goal in a 3–0 victory over his former club Slavia Prague. Pekhart continued his fine form during the 2010–11 season, scoring 11 goals in 15 league matches. However, after just half of the 2010–11 Czech First League season, he moved on loan to fellow Czech First League side Sparta Prague as part of a deal with 1. FC Nürnberg, whom he joined on 1 July 2011.

==== Loan to Sparta Prague ====
Pekhart moved on loan for the second half of the 2010–11 season to Sparta Prague. On 19 March 2011, Pekhart scored his first two goals for Sparta in a 2–0 victory over FC Zbrojovka Brno. In nine league games for Sparta, Pekhart scored seven goals. He ended the 2010–11 season scoring 18 goals in 24 matches, one goal behind former teammate David Lafata in the Czech First League scoring table.

=== Nürnberg ===
On 6 August 2011, Pekhart scored in his debut in the Bundesliga, helping 1. FC Nürnberg to a 1–0 victory over Hertha Berlin on the opening day of Germany's football season. On 1 October 2011, Pekhart scored the equalizer in a 3–3 draw with Mainz. He ended his first season in Germany with 10 goals in 34 matches.

=== FC Ingolstadt 04 ===
On 28 August 2014, Pekhart signed a three-year deal with the German second league side FC Ingolstadt 04. He made his debut for the club on 31 August, appearing as a second-half substitute in a 0–3 victory over SV Sandhausen. While with Ingolstadt Pekhart was seldom used.

=== AEK Athens ===
Pekhart moved to AEK Athens on 1 February 2016. On 4 February 2016, he made his debut with the club, in an away 1–1 draw against Iraklis at Kaftanzoglio Stadium. On 20 February 2016, Pekhart scored his first goal for AEK in a 1–1 draw with Iraklis. On 10 April 2016, Pekhart scored two goals in a 2–1 victory over Panionios F.C. During the 2016–17 season, Pekhart was AEK's top scorer, scoring 12 goals in 31 matches.

=== Hapoel Be'er Sheva ===
On 21 July 2017, Pekhart signed with Hapoel Be'er Sheva for three years. On 10 August 2017, Pekhart scored his first goal for Hapoel in a 4–2 victory over Bnei Yehuda Tel Aviv in the 2017 Israel Super Cup, claiming his first title with the Israeli side. On 19 August 2017, Pekhart scored his first goal in the Israeli league in a 1–1 draw with Maccabi Netanya. He ended the 2017–18 season scoring 10 goals in 28 matches, helping Hapoel win its fifth league title.

=== Las Palmas ===
On 13 August of the following year, he agreed to a two-year deal with Segunda División side UD Las Palmas. Pekhart scored his first goal for Las Palmas on 18 November 2018 in a 4–1 loss to Cádiz CF. On 27 September 2019, he scored his club's third goal in a 3–2 victory over Albacete Balompié. With the trio of Pekhart, Pedri, and Jonathan Viera Las Palmas went on an unbeaten run to move up the Segunda Division standings. On 5 October 2019, Pedri and Pekhart goals helped the island side to a 0–2 victory over CD Lugo. On 13 October 2019, Las Palmas won their fourth straight match, defeating Deportivo La Coruña 3–0 with two goals by Pekhart and one by Jonathan Viera.

=== Legia Warsaw ===
On 10 February 2020, Pekhart agreed to a two-and-a-half-year deal with Ekstraklasa side Legia Warsaw. On 22 February 2020, Pekhart made his debut for Legia, scoring his club's fourth goal in a 4–0 victory over Jagiellonia Białystok. On 7 June 2020, Pekhart scored two goals to help Legia to a 1–3 victory over Wisła Kraków. He ended his first season in Poland appearing in 11 league matches scoring 5 goals, helping Legia to a league title.

On 21 March 2021, Pekhart scored four goals in a 4–0 victory over Zagłębie Lubin. During the 2020–21 season, he was the leading scorer in Ekstraklasa, scoring 22 goals as Legia won the league title again. On 14 July 2021, Pekhard scored the second goal in a 2–0 victory in the second leg of the first round of UEFA Champions League qualifying against FK Bodø/Glimt as the Polish champions advanced to the next round. Pekhart ended the 2021–22 season in Poland appearing in 45 matches and scoring 10 goals, in a season in which Legia finished 10th in the league standings. After rejecting offers to renew his contract by Legia, Pekhart left the Polish club on 30 June 2022.

=== Gaziantep ===
On 10 August 2022, Pekhart joined Gaziantep in Turkey on a two-year contract.

=== Return to Legia Warsaw ===
On 30 January 2023, Pekhart agreed to a one-and-a-half-year deal with Ekstraklasa side Legia Warsaw.

On 23 May 2025, Legia announced they would not extend their deal with Pekhart for the following season.

=== FK Dukla Prague ===
On 4 January 2026, Pekhart signed a contract with Dukla Prague. On 26 May 2026, his 37th birthday, Pekhart announced on Instagram the end of his career.

== International career ==
Pekhart has represented his country at youth international level. Pekhart played and scored in the final of the 2006 UEFA Under-17 Championship in Luxembourg for his country against Russia.

In 2007, he represented his country in the FIFA Under-20 World Cup in Canada as the youngest player in the squad having just turned 18. He played in all seven matches of the tournament, including the final against Argentina in which the Czechs finished runners up after Mauro Zárate scored the winning goal four minutes from full-time for Argentina.

He made his debut for the Czech Republic on 22 May 2010 in a match against Turkey.

== Career statistics ==
=== Club ===
As of match played 24 May 2025

Appearances and goals by club, season and competition
Club	Season	League			National cup (Note: Includes FA Cup, Czech Cup, DFB-Pokal, Greek Football Cup, Israel State Cup, Copa del Rey, Polish Cup, Turkish Cup)		League cup (Note: Includes Football League Cup, Toto Cup)		Continental		Other		Total	
Club	Season	Division	Apps	Goals	Apps	Goals	Apps	Goals	Apps	Goals	Apps	Goals	Apps	Goals
Southampton (loan)	2008–09	Championship	9	1	0	0	1	0	—		—		10	1
Slavia Prague (loan)	2008–09	Czech First League	13	2	1	1	—		—		—		14	3
Jablonec	2009–10	Czech First League	14	4	5	0	—		—		—		19	4
Jablonec	2010–11	Czech First League	15	11	2	4	—		1 (Note: Appearance(s) in UEFA Europa League)	0	—		18	15
Jablonec	Total		29	15	7	4	—		1	0	—		37	19
Sparta Prague (loan)	2010–11	Czech First League	9	7	—		—		2	0	—		11	7
1. FC Nürnberg	2011–12	Bundesliga	31	9	3	1	—		—		—		34	10
1. FC Nürnberg	2012–13	Bundesliga	31	4	1	0	—		—		—		32	4
1. FC Nürnberg	2013–14	Bundesliga	23	1	0	0	—		—		—		23	1
1. FC Nürnberg	2014–15	2. Bundesliga	3	0	0	0	—		—		—		3	0
1. FC Nürnberg	Total		88	14	4	1	—		—		—		92	15
FC Ingolstadt	2014–15	2. Bundesliga	12	0	0	0	—		—		—		12	0
FC Ingolstadt	2015–16	2. Bundesliga	4	0	1	0	—		—		—		5	0
FC Ingolstadt	Total		16	0	1	0	—		—		—		17	0
AEK Athens	2015–16	Super League Greece	14	3	3	0	—		—		—		17	3
AEK Athens	2016–17	Super League Greece	26	9	4	3	—		1	0	—		31	12
AEK Athens	Total		40	12	7	3	—		1	0	—		48	15
Hapoel Be'er Sheva	2017–18	Israeli Premier League	28	10	2	0	5	0	7 (Note: Two appearances in UEFA Champions League, five appearances in UEFA Europa League)	0	1 (Note: Appearance in Israel Super Cup)	1	43	11
Hapoel Be'er Sheva	2018–19	Israeli Premier League	0	0	0	0	0	0	2 (Note: One appearance in UEFA Champions League, one appearance in UEFA Europa League)	0	—		2	0
Hapoel Be'er Sheva	Total		28	10	2	0	5	0	9	0	—		45	11
Las Palmas	2018–19	Segunda División	14	1	1	0	—		—		—		15	1
Las Palmas	2019–20	Segunda División	17	5	1	0	—		—		—		18	5
Las Palmas	Total		31	6	2	0	—		—		—		33	6
Legia Warsaw	2019–20	Ekstraklasa	11	5	1	0	—		—		—		12	5
Legia Warsaw	2020–21	Ekstraklasa	25	22	3	1	—		4 (Note: Two appearances in UEFA Champions League, two appearances and one goal in UEFA Europa League)	1	1 (Note: Appearance in Polish Super Cup)	0	33	24
Legia Warsaw	2021–22	Ekstraklasa	31	9	3	0	—		10 (Note: Five appearances and one goal in UEFA Champions League, five appearances in UEFA Europa League)	1	1	0	45	10
Legia Warsaw	Total		67	36	7	1	—		14	2	2	0	90	39
Gaziantep	2022–23	Süper Lig	12	1	1	1	—		—		—		13	2
Legia Warsaw	2022–23	Ekstraklasa	13	5	3	1	—		—		—		16	6
Legia Warsaw	2023–24	Ekstraklasa	24	8	2	1	—		11 (Note: Appearances in UEFA Conference League)	4	1	0	38	13
Legia Warsaw	2024–25	Ekstraklasa	16	1	1	0	—		12	4	—		29	5
Legia Warsaw	Total		53	14	6	2	—		23	8	1	0	83	24
Career total			395	118	38	13	6	0	50	10	4	1	493	142

=== International ===
As of match played 19 November 2022

Appearances and goals by national team and year
National team	Year	Apps	Goals
Czech Republic
Czech Republic	2010	1	0
Czech Republic	2011	7	0
Czech Republic	2012	10	1
Czech Republic	2013	1	1
Czech Republic	2021	4	0
Czech Republic	2022	3	0
Total		26	2

Scores and results list the Czech Republic's goal tally first, score column indicates score after each Pekhart goal.

List of international goals scored by Tomáš Pekhart
No.	Date	Venue	Opponent	Score	Result	Competition
1	12 October 2012	Stadion města Plzně, Plzeň, Czech Republic	Malta	2–1	3–1	2014 World Cup qualification
2	11 October 2013	Ta' Qali National Stadium, Ta' Qali, Malta	Malta	4–1	4–1	2014 World Cup qualification

== Honours ==
Slavia Prague

- Czech First League: 2008–09

FC Ingolstadt

- 2. Bundesliga: 2014–15

AEK Athens

- Greek Cup: 2015–16

Hapoel Be'er-Sheva

- Israeli Premier League: 2017–18
- Israel Super Cup: 2017

Legia Warsaw

- Ekstraklasa: 2019–20, 2020–21
- Polish Cup: 2022–23, 2024–25
- Polish Super Cup: 2023

Czech Republic U17

- UEFA European Under-17 Championship runner-up: 2006

Czech Republic U20

- FIFA U-20 World Cup runner-up: 2007

Individual

- Ekstraklasa top scorer: 2020–21 (22 goals)
- Ekstraklasa Forward of the Season: 2020–21
- Piłka Nożna Foreigner of the Year: 2020
