= Valerian Gvilia =

Georgian footballer

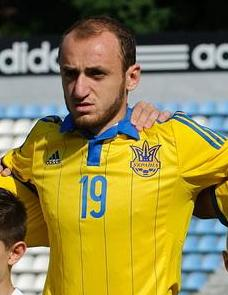
- Gvilia with Ukraine U21 in 2015

Personal information
- Full name: Valerian Yaroslavovych Gvilia
- Date of birth: 24 May 1994 (age 32)
- Place of birth: Zugdidi, Georgia
- Height: 1.82 m (5 ft 11 1/2 in)
- Position: Midfielder

Team information
- Current team: Dinamo Tbilisi
- Number: 18

Youth career
- 2011–2014: Metalist Kharkiv

Senior career*
Years	Team	Apps	(Gls)
2014–2015	Metalurh Zaporizhya	26	(1)
2016	Minsk	15	(4)
2016–2017	BATE Borisov	23	(5)
2018–2019	Luzern	23	(2)
2019	→ Górnik Zabrze (loan)	17	(1)
2019–2021	Legia Warsaw	54	(8)
2021–2023	Raków Częstochowa	22	(0)
2024	Piast Gliwice	2	(0)
2025–	Dinamo Tbilisi	14	(2)

International career
2015	Ukraine U21	4	(0)
2016	Georgia U21	4	(0)
2016–2022	Georgia	44	(3)
- * Club domestic league appearances and goals as of 10 December 2025

Valerian "Vako" Gvilia (Georgian: ვალერიან "ვაკო" გვილია, pronounced [valeɾian vakʼo ɡʷilia]; Ukrainian: Валеріане Ярославович Гвілія; born 24 May 1994) is a Georgian professional footballer who plays as a midfielder for Erovnuli Liga club Dinamo Tbilisi. He also has Ukrainian citizenship. Besides Ukraine, he has played in Belarus, Switzerland, Poland and Georgia.

== Club career ==
Gvilia is product of youth team system Metalurh Zaporizhya. He made his Ukrainian Premier League debut for Metalurh entering as a second time playing against Dnipro Dnipropetrovsk on 15 August 2014. Gvilia signed a contract with Belarusian club BATE Borisov in early July 2016.

In January 2018, Gvilia signed a three-year deal with Swiss Super League side Luzern.

From 2019 untl 2021, he played for Polish side Legia Warsaw, with whom he won two national championships.

On 31 August 2021, he was announced as a player of the Polish vice-champion, Raków Częstochowa. On 30 January 2023, having not made an appearance for the club since late August 2022, he terminated his contract by mutual consent.

He remained without a club until 7 March 2024, when he joined Piast Gliwice on a deal until the end of the season, reuniting with his former Legia manager Aleksandar Vuković. He made his debut as a late substitute in a 3–1 away loss against Legia on 17 March. He made one more appearance before leaving the club on 31 May upon the expiration of his contract.

== International career ==
Gvilia was named in Georgia's senior squad for 2018 FIFA World Cup qualifiers against Republic of Ireland and Wales in October 2016.

== Career statistics ==
=== Club ===
As of match played 27 September 2025

Appearances and goals by club, season and competition
Club	Season	League			National cup (Note: Includes Ukrainian Cup, Belarusian Cup, Swiss Cup, Polish Cup)		Continental		Other		Total	
Club	Season	Division	Apps	Goals	Apps	Goals	Apps	Goals	Apps	Goals	Apps	Goals
Metalurh Zaporizhya	2014–15	Ukrainian Premier League	12	0	2	0	—		—		14	0
Metalurh Zaporizhya	2015–16	Ukrainian Premier League	14	1	1	0	—		—		15	1
Metalurh Zaporizhya	Total		26	1	3	1	—		—		29	1
Minsk	2015	Belarusian Premier League	15	4	4	0	—		—		18	4
BATE Borisov	2016	Belarusian Premier League	14	4	—		—		—		14	4
BATE Borisov	2017	Belarusian Premier League	9	1	5	1	2 (Note: One appearance in UEFA Champions League, one appearance in UEFA Europa League)	0	1 (Note: Appearance in Belarusian Super Cup)	0	17	2
BATE Borisov	2018	Belarusian Premier League	—		1	0	1 (Note: Appearance in UEFA Champions League)	0	—		2	0
BATE Borisov	Total		23	5	6	1	3	0	1	0	33	6
Luzern	2016–17	Swiss Super League	12	1	—		—		—		12	1
Luzern	2018–19	Swiss Super League	11	1	2	1	2 (Note: Appearances in UEFA Europa League)	0	—		15	2
Luzern	Total		23	2	2	1	2	0	—		27	3
Górnik Zabrze (loan)	2018–19	Ekstraklasa	17	1	1	0	—		—		18	1
Legia Warsaw	2019–20	Ekstraklasa	35	8	4	2	8	1	—		47	11
Legia Warsaw	2020–21	Ekstraklasa	19	0	1	0	3 (Note: Two appearances in UEFA Champions League, one appearance in UEFA Europa League)	0	0	0	23	0
Legia Warsaw	Total		54	8	5	2	11	1	0	0	70	11
Raków Częstochowa	2021–22	Ekstraklasa	21	0	3	1	—		—		24	1
Raków Częstochowa	2022–23	Ekstraklasa	1	0	0	0	3 (Note: Appearances in UEFA Europa Conference League)	0	0	0	4	0
Raków Częstochowa	Total		22	0	3	1	3	0	0	0	28	1
Piast Gliwice	2023–24	Ekstraklasa	2	0	—		—		—		2	0
Dinamo Tbilisi	2025	Erovnuli Liga	9	2	0	0	—		—		9	2
Career total			191	23	24	5	19	1	1	0	235	29

=== International goals ===
Scores and results list Georgia's goal tally first, score column indicates score after each Gvilia goal.

List of international goals scored by Valerian Gvilia
No.	Date	Venue	Opponent	Score	Result	Competition
1	5 September 2017	Ernst-Happel-Stadion, Vienna, Austria	Austria	1–0	1–1	2018 FIFA World Cup qualification
2	16 October 2018	Daugava Stadium, Riga, Latvia	Latvia	2–0	3–0	2018–19 UEFA Nations League D
3	7 June 2019	Boris Paichadze National Stadium, Tbilisi, Georgia	Gibraltar	1–0	3–0	UEFA Euro 2020 qualification

== Honours ==
BATE Borisov

- Belarusian Premier League: 2016
- Belarusian Super Cup: 2017

Legia Warsaw

- Ekstraklasa: 2019–20, 2020–21

Raków Częstochowa

- Ekstraklasa: 2022–23
- Polish Cup: 2021–22
