= Michał Karbownik =

Polish footballer (born 2001)

Personal information
- Date of birth: 13 March 2001 (age 25)
- Place of birth: Radom, Poland
- Height: 1.75 m (5 ft 9 in)
- Position: Full-back

Team information
- Current team: İstanbul Başakşehir
- Number: 33

Youth career
- 2011–2012: Zorza Kowala
- 2012–2015: Młodzik 18 Radom
- 2015–2018: Legia Warsaw

Senior career*
Years	Team	Apps	(Gls)
2016–2019	Legia Warsaw II	45	(0)
2019–2020	Legia Warsaw	31	(0)
2020–2023	Brighton & Hove Albion	0	(0)
2020–2021	→ Legia Warsaw (loan)	5	(0)
2021–2022	→ Olympiacos (loan)	7	(0)
2021–2022	→ Olympiacos B (loan)	12	(0)
2022–2023	→ Fortuna Düsseldorf (loan)	26	(1)
2022–2023	→ Fortuna Düsseldorf II (loan)	1	(0)
2023–2026	Hertha BSC	72	(0)
2026–	İstanbul Başakşehir	9	(0)

International career
2015–2016	Poland U15	2	(0)
2016–2017	Poland U16	6	(0)
2017–2018	Poland U17	13	(1)
2018–2019	Poland U18	3	(0)
2019–2020	Poland U19	7	(1)
2021–2022	Poland U21	8	(0)
2020–2023	Poland	4	(0)
- * Club domestic league appearances and goals as of 16:17, 22 November 2026 (UTC)

Michał Karbownik (born 13 March 2001) is a Polish professional footballer who plays as a defender for Süper Lig club İstanbul Başakşehir. He has made four appearances for the Poland national team at senior level.

== Club career ==
=== Early career ===
Karbownik was born in the city of Radom, located 62 miles south of Warsaw. He began his football career at Zorza Kowala at the age of 10. In 2012, he joined a local club Młodzik 18 Radom.

=== Legia Warsaw ===
In 2015, Karbownik joined Legia Warsaw. He joined the Academy, and was soon promoted to Legia's reserve team in 2016. In 2019, he began training with the first team, and on 25 August 2019, he made his debut for Legia in a 3–2 away win against ŁKS Łódź, providing an assist for Dominik Nagy. He impressed the following game in a 3–1 win against Raków Częstochowa, where he provided an impressive assist for Jarosław Niezgoda. Karbownik quickly established himself as a key player for Legia and became a regular starter. In May 2020, Karbownik extended his contract with Legia until 2024.

Karbownik was a key player in Legia's 2019–20 Ekstraklasa triumph, and soon gained recognition. In January 2020, he was named by UEFA as one of the Best Young Players to look out for in 2020. In February 2020, he was named the 'Discovery of the Year' by Polish football magazine "Piłka Nożna". He won the Ekstraklasa 'Best Youngster of the Season' award for the 2019–20 season, and was in the 40-man shortlist for the Golden Boy award.

=== Brighton & Hove Albion ===
On 6 October 2020, he signed for English club Brighton & Hove Albion for a transfer fee of £3 million.

==== Legia Warsaw (loan) ====
Karbownik was immediately loaned back to former club Legia Warsaw until the end of the season. Under new head coach Czesław Michniewicz, Karbownik began to play in the midfield (having previously played at left-back under Aleksandar Vuković). On 2 November 2020, Legia confirmed that Karbownik tested positive for COVID-19, which omitted him from Legia's upcoming games. He made a return to the team on 29 November, in a 2–2 draw against Piast Gliwice. However, on 8 December, Legia announced that Karbownik was ruled out of the squad for the rest of 2020 due to stress fractures in his tibia, and was recommended to rest to avoid aggravating the injury.

==== Return to Brighton ====
On 17 January 2021, Brighton announced they had recalled Karbownik from his loan at Legia.

Karbownik made his debut for Brighton on 10 February 2021, starting and playing the full match in the 1–0 away defeat against Leicester City in the FA Cup fifth round.

He made his second Brighton appearance and first of the 2021–22 season in Albions' 2–0 away victory over Cardiff City in the EFL Cup second round on 24 August 2021.

==== Olympiacos (loan) ====
On 28 August 2021, it was announced that Karbownik would join Greek champions Olympiacos on a season-long loan with an option to buy. He made his debut on 12 September, starting in the 0–0 home draw against Atromitos where he was later substituted.

==== Fortuna Düsseldorf (loan) ====
Karbownik signed for Fortuna Düsseldorf of the 2. Bundesliga on 4 August 2022, on a season-long loan.

=== Hertha BSC ===
On 8 August 2023, German side Hertha BSC announced the signing of Karbownik on a three-year deal.

=== İstanbul Başakşehir ===
On 22 June 2026, Karbownik moved to Turkish club İstanbul Başakşehir on a three-year deal after his contract with Hertha had expired.

== International career ==
In September 2020, Karbownik was called up to the Polish senior squad for upcoming UEFA Nations League fixtures against the Netherlands and Bosnia and Herzegovina, but did not make an appearance in any of the two fixtures. On 7 October 2020, one day after completing his transfer to Brighton and Hove Albion, he debuted in a 5–1 victory against Finland, providing an assist for Arkadiusz Milik. In the following two games, Karbownik came on as a substitute for Kamil Jóźwiak in a 0–0 draw against Italy and 3–0 victory against Bosnia and Herzegovina.

== Career statistics ==
=== Club ===
As of match played 10 May 2026

Appearances and goals by club, season and competition
Club	Season	League			National cup (Note: Includes Polish Cup, FA Cup, Greek Cup, DFB-Pokal)		League cup (Note: Includes EFL Cup)		Europe		Total	
Club	Season	Division	Apps	Goals	Apps	Goals	Apps	Goals	Apps	Goals	Apps	Goals
Legia Warsaw	2019–20	Ekstraklasa	28	0	5	0	—		0	0	33	0
Legia Warsaw	2020–21	Ekstraklasa	3	0	1	0	—		4 (Note: Two appearances in UEFA Champions League, two appearances in UEFA Europa League)	0	8	0
Legia Warsaw	Total		31	0	6	0	—		4	0	41	0
Brighton & Hove Albion	2020–21	Premier League	0	0	1	0	0	0	—		1	0
Brighton & Hove Albion	2021–22	Premier League	0	0	0	0	1	0	—		1	0
Brighton & Hove Albion	Total		0	0	1	0	1	0	0	0	2	0
Legia Warsaw (loan)	2020–21	Ekstraklasa	5	0	1	0	—		—		6	0
Olympiacos (loan)	2021–22	Super League Greece	7	0	1	0	—		1 (Note: Appearances in UEFA Europa League)	0	9	0
Olympiacos B (loan)	2021–22	Super League Greece 2	12	0	—		—		—		12	0
Fortuna Düsseldorf (loan)	2022–23	2. Bundesliga	26	1	1	0	—		—		27	1
Fortuna Düsseldorf II (loan)	2022–23	Regionalliga West	1	0	—		—		—		1	0
Hertha BSC	2023–24	2. Bundesliga	24	0	2	0	—		—		26	0
Hertha BSC	2024–25	2. Bundesliga	22	0	2	0	—		—		24	0
Hertha BSC	2025–26	2. Bundesliga	26	0	3	0	—		—		29	0
Hertha BSC	Total		72	0	7	0	—		—		79	0
İstanbul Başakşehir	2026–27	Süper Lig	0	0	0	0	0	0	—		0	0
Career total			154	1	17	0	1	0	5	0	177	1

=== International ===
As of match played 24 March 2023

Appearances and goals by national team and year
National team	Year	Apps	Goals
Poland	2020	3	0
Poland	2021	0	0
Poland	2022	0	0
Poland	2023	1	0
Total		4	0

== Honours ==
Legia Warsaw

- Ekstraklasa: 2019–20, 2020–21

Legia Warsaw II

- Polish Cup (Masovia regionals): 2018–19

Olympiacos

- Super League Greece: 2021–22

Individual

- Polish Newcomer of the Year: 2019
- Ekstraklasa Young Player of the Season: 2019–20
- Ekstraklasa Young Player of the Month: December 2019
