= Piotr Pyrdoł =

Polish footballer

Personal information
- Date of birth: 27 April 1999 (age 27)
- Place of birth: Łódź, Poland
- Height: 1.78 m (5 ft 10 in)
- Position: Winger

Youth career
- –2014: UKS SMS Łódź
- 2014–2017: ŁKS Łódź

Senior career*
Years	Team	Apps	(Gls)
2017–2020	ŁKS Łódź	68	(6)
2020	Legia Warsaw	2	(0)
2020–2022	Wisła Płock	15	(0)
2021	→ Stomil Olsztyn (loan)	9	(0)
2022–2023	Skra Częstochowa	32	(1)
2023–2025	Pogoń Siedlce	46	(5)
2025–2026	Mławianka Mława	8	(3)

International career
2018	Poland U20	1	(0)
2019	Poland U21	1	(0)
- * Club domestic league appearances and goals as of 19:36, 23 February 2026 (UTC)

Piotr Pyrdoł (born 27 April 1999) is a Polish professional footballer who plays as a winger.

== Career ==
Pyrdoł started his career with ŁKS Łódź.

On 10 January 2020, Legia Warsaw confirmed that Pyrdoł had joined the club on a deal until June 2022 with an option for a further year. He took the shirt number 31. On 26 August 2020, he was transferred to Wisła Płock. Wisła loaned him to Stomil Olsztyn in 2021.

On 3 February 2022, Pyrdoł left Wisła to join I liga side Skra Częstochowa.

On 14 July 2023, he joined II liga outfit Pogoń Siedlce on a one-year deal, with an option for another year.

On 8 October 2025, Pyrdoł signed with III liga club Mławianka Mława.

== Personal life ==
His father Marcin was also a professional footballer; he made one Ekstraklasa appearance for ŁKS, before working for their academy as a coach.

== Honours ==
Legia Warsaw

- Ekstraklasa: 2019–20

Pogoń Siedlce

- II liga: 2023–24
