= Luís Rocha (footballer, born 1993) =

Portuguese footballer

Personal information
- Full name: Luís Augusto Martins Rocha
- Date of birth: 27 June 1993 (age 33)
- Place of birth: Gavião, Portugal
- Height: 1.77 m (5 ft 10 in)
- Position: Left-back

Team information
- Current team: Lusitânia
- Number: 16

Youth career
- 2001–2006: Famalicão
- 2006–2012: Vitória Guimarães

Senior career*
Years	Team	Apps	(Gls)
2012–2016	Vitória Guimarães B	64	(2)
2013–2016	Vitória Guimarães	37	(1)
2016−2019	Panetolikos	47	(1)
2019−2021	Legia Warsaw	26	(0)
2020	Legia Warsaw II	3	(1)
2021−2022	Cracovia	23	(0)
2021−2022	Cracovia II	2	(0)
2022−2023	Chania	24	(2)
2023−2024	Tondela	13	(1)
2024–2025	A.E. Kifisia	7	(1)
2025–	Lusitânia	28	(2)

International career
2008–2009	Portugal U16	9	(0)
2009	Portugal U17	6	(0)
- * Club domestic league appearances and goals as of 23:12, 28 May 2026 (UTC)

Luís Augusto Martins Rocha (born 27 June 1993) is a Portuguese professional footballer who plays mainly as a left-back for Liga Portugal 2 club Lusitânia.

== Club career ==
Born in the village of Gavião in Vila Nova de Famalicão, Braga District, Rocha began his development at hometown club F.C. Famalicão and concluded it at Vitória de Guimarães. He made his professional debut for the latter's reserves on 12 July 2012 as they began their history with a Segunda Liga goalless home draw against S.C. Covilhã, as an 80th-minute substitute for Diogo Lamelas. He also took part that season for the first team in the Primeira Liga, and made one appearance in their winning of the Taça de Portugal, the 2–0 semi-final away victory over C.F. Os Belenenses.

Rocha extended his contract on 25 July 2013, until 2017. He scored his first goal on 14 February 2015 to open a 4–0 home rout of Atlético Clube de Portugal for the reserves, and his only in the top flight was the following 6 January in a 4–3 win at Moreirense FC.

On 27 May 2016, Rocha ended his 13-year association with Vitória and signed a three-year deal with Panetolikos F.C. in Greece. After two and a half years in Super League Greece, he switched countries again to Legia Warsaw of Poland, managed by compatriot Ricardo Sá Pinto. He and fellow Portuguese André Martins were Ekstraklasa champions at the end of the 2019–20 campaign.

== Honours ==
Vitória de Guimarães

- Taça de Portugal: 2012–13

Legia Warsaw

- Ekstraklasa: 2019–20, 2020–21
