= Kacper Skibicki =

Polish footballer

Personal information
- Full name: Kacper Skibicki
- Date of birth: 11 October 2001 (age 25)
- Place of birth: Chełmno, Poland
- Height: 1.75 m (5 ft 9 in)
- Position: Midfielder

Team information
- Current team: Elana Toruń
- Number: 22

Youth career
- –2017: Pomowiec Kijewo Królewskie
- 2017–2018: Olimpia Grudziądz

Senior career*
Years	Team	Apps	(Gls)
2018–2019	Olimpia Grudziądz	11	(1)
2019–2023	Legia Warsaw	23	(2)
2019	→ Olimpia Grudziądz (loan)	7	(1)
2019–2020	→ Pogoń Siedlce (loan)	15	(1)
2020–2022	Legia Warsaw II	28	(1)
2023	→ GKS Tychy (loan)	15	(0)
2023–2025	GKS Tychy	11	(0)
2024–2025	→ KKS 1925 Kalisz (loan)	17	(0)
2025–2026	KKS 1925 Kalisz	13	(1)
2026–	Elana Toruń	9	(1)

International career
2019	Poland U18	2	(0)
2021	Poland U20	1	(0)
- * Club domestic league appearances and goals as of 17:12, 4 June 2026 (UTC)

Kacper Skibicki (born 11 October 2001) is a Polish professional footballer who plays as a midfielder for III liga club Elana Toruń.

== Career ==
On 8 November 2020, he made his Legia Warsaw debut in a 2–1 victory over Lech Poznań, and scored his first goal for the club.

On 4 January 2023, he joined I liga side GKS Tychy on a six-month loan with an option to buy. On 16 June 2023, the move was made permanent, with Skibicki signing a two-year deal.

After being deemed surplus to GKS' requirements in early July 2024, Skibicki was sent on a season-long loan to II liga club KKS 1925 Kalisz on 1 August that year. On 21 July 2025, he moved to KKS permanently on a one-year deal. He left KKS by mutual consent on 22 January 2026.

On 18 February 2026, Skibicki signed with Elana Toruń in the III liga.

== Honours ==
Legia Warsaw

- Ekstraklasa: 2020–21
