= André Martins (footballer, born 1990) =

Portuguese footballer

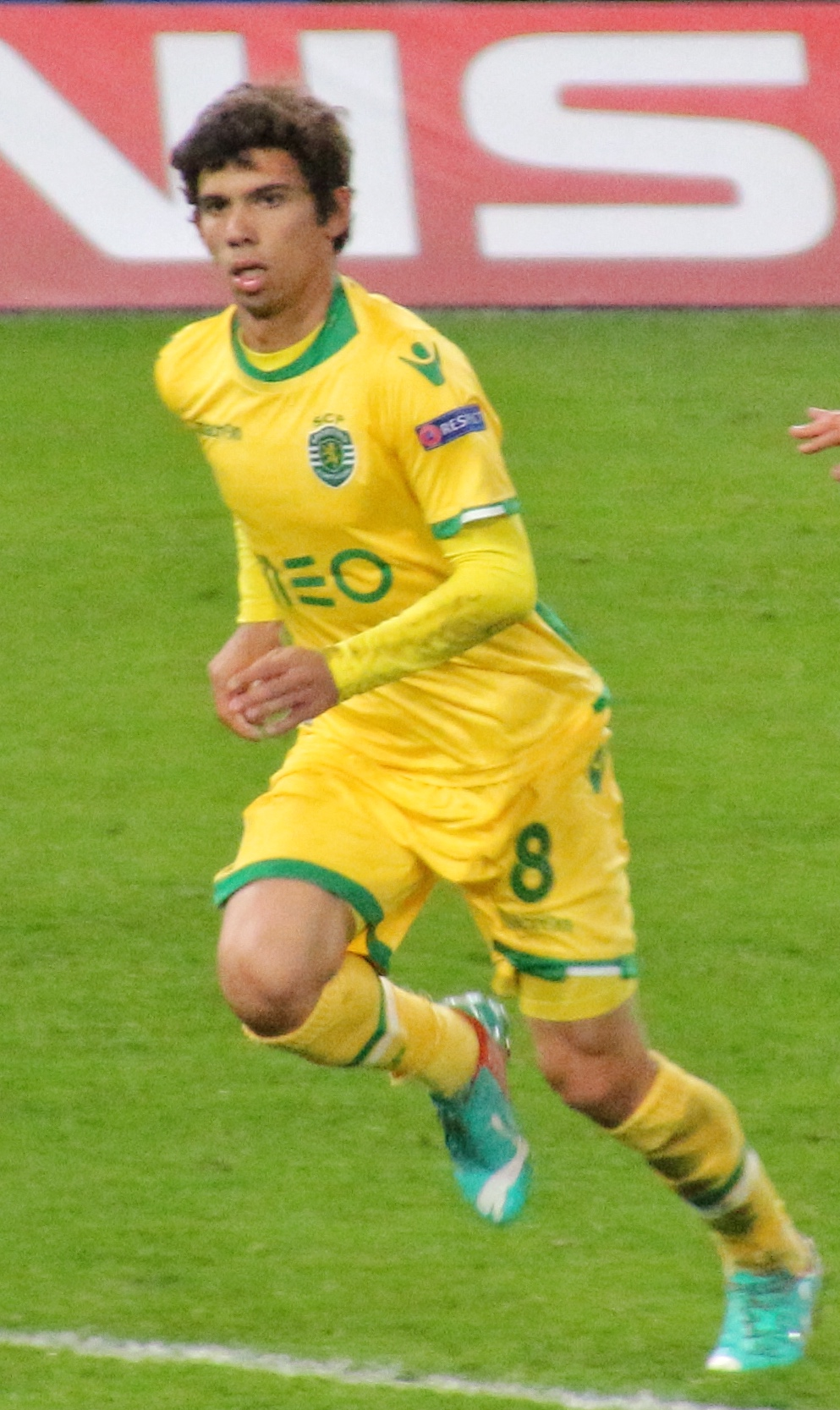
- Martins in action for Sporting CP in 2014

Personal information
- Full name: André Renato Soares Martins
- Date of birth: 21 January 1990 (age 36)
- Place of birth: Santa Maria da Feira, Portugal
- Height: 1.69 m (5 ft 7 in)
- Position: Central midfielder

Youth career
- 1998–2001: Argoncilhe
- 2001–2003: Feirense
- 2003–2009: Sporting CP

Senior career*
Years	Team	Apps	(Gls)
2009–2016	Sporting CP	72	(3)
2009–2010	→ Real Massamá (loan)	30	(1)
2010	→ Belenenses (loan)	2	(0)
2011	→ Pinhalnovense (loan)	10	(1)
2012–2016	Sporting CP B	4	(0)
2016–2018	Olympiacos	33	(1)
2018–2022	Legia Warsaw	94	(2)
2022–2023	Hapoel Be'er Sheva	23	(1)
Total		268	(9)

International career
2010	Portugal U20	5	(0)
2011–2012	Portugal U21	17	(3)
2016	Portugal Olympic (O.P.)	4	(0)
2013	Portugal	2	(0)
- * Club domestic league appearances and goals

André Renato Soares Martins (born 21 January 1990) is a Portuguese former professional footballer who played as a central midfielder.

Brought up at Sporting CP, where he made 103 total appearances, he won the Super League Greece at Olympiacos and two Ekstraklasa titles for Legia Warsaw.

== Club career ==
=== Sporting CP ===
After graduating from Sporting CP's youth academy Martins was loaned out, along with six other former club juniors, to Real S.C. in the third division. For 2010–11, newly appointed coach Paulo Sérgio called him back for pre-season trainings, and, in August, he was sent to C.F. Os Belenenses in the Segunda Liga, in a season-long loan. However, after José Mota's arrival at the team's bench, the player was deemed surplus to requirements and another loan was arranged in January 2011, at third-tier side C.D. Pinhalnovense.

Mainly due to injuries to teammates, Martins featured in Sporting's bench in some matches in 2011–12. On 20 October 2011 he made his official debut for the Lions, coming on as a substitute for Diego Capel for the last 15 minutes of a 2–0 home win against FC Vaslui in the group stage of the UEFA Europa League.

Martins scored three goals in 29 competitive games in 2013–14 for the eventual vice-champions, his first in the Primeira Liga and overall coming on 15 September 2013 in a 2–0 away victory over S.C. Olhanense. Following the appointment of coach Jorge Jesus, however, he was told to look for a new club, and left the Estádio José Alvalade on 30 June 2016.

=== Olympiacos ===
On 8 August 2016, free agent Martins signed with six-time consecutive Super League Greece champions Olympiacos FC. In his first season, he contributed one goal from 29 appearances to another national championship conquest.

Martins featured much less the following campaign, and was deemed surplus to requirements after the arrival of his compatriot Pedro Martins as manager.

=== Legia Warsaw ===
On 6 September 2018, Martins joined Legia Warsaw on a 12-month contract with the option to extend it for another year. He won the Ekstraklasa title in two consecutive seasons, being accompanied by countryman Rafael Lopes in 2020–21.

During his spell at the Stadion Wojska Polskiego, Martins played 128 official matches and scored twice.

=== Hapoel Be'er Sheva ===
On 13 January 2022, Martins agreed to a one-and-a-half-year deal with Hapoel Be'er Sheva F.C. of the Israeli Premier League. Alongside compatriots Miguel Vítor and Hélder Lopes, he won the State Cup and Super Cup in his first year, both on penalties against Maccabi Haifa FC.

== International career ==
Martins earned 43 caps for Portugal at youth level, including 17 for the under-21 team. On 10 June 2013 he made his debut for the full side, playing the dying minutes of the 1–0 friendly win over Croatia in Geneva. On 14 August, in another exhibition game, he replaced Ruben Amorim midway through the second half of a 1–1 draw against the Netherlands.

== Career statistics ==
Appearances and goals by club, season and competition
Club	Season	League			National cup (Note: Includes Taça de Portugal, Greek Cup, Polish Cup, Israel State Cup)		League cup (Note: Includes Taça da Liga)		Europe		Other		Total	
Club	Season	Division	Apps	Goals	Apps	Goals	Apps	Goals	Apps	Goals	Apps	Goals	Apps	Goals
Real Massamá (loan)	2009–10	Segunda Divisão	30	1	2	0	0	0	0	0	0	0	32	1
Belenenses (loan)	2010–11	Liga de Honra	2	0	0	0	3	0	0	0	0	0	5	0
Pinhalnovense (loan)	2010–11	Segunda Divisão	10	1	0	0	0	0	0	0	0	0	10	1
Sporting CP	2011–12	Primeira Liga	11	0	3	0	1	0	6 (Note: Appearances in UEFA Europa League)	0	0	0	21	0
Sporting CP	2012–13	Primeira Liga	15	0	0	0	0	0	4	0	0	0	19	0
Sporting CP	2013–14	Primeira Liga	27	3	1	0	1	0	0	0	0	0	29	3
Sporting CP	2014–15	Primeira Liga	18	0	4	1	1	0	4 (Note: Three appearances in UEFA Champions League, one appearance in UEFA Europa League)	0	0	0	27	1
Sporting CP	2015–16	Primeira Liga	1	0	1	0	2	0	3	0	0	0	7	0
Sporting CP	Total		72	3	9	1	5	0	17	0	0	0	103	4
Olympiacos	2016–17	Super League Greece	24	1	4	0	0	0	11	0	0	0	39	1
Olympiacos	2017–18	Super League Greece	9	0	5	1	0	0	0	0	0	0	14	1
Olympiacos	Total		33	1	9	1	0	0	11	0	0	0	53	2
Legia Warsaw	2018–19	Ekstraklasa	26	2	2	0	—		—		—		28	2
Legia Warsaw	2019–20	Ekstraklasa	32	0	4	0	—		8	0	—		44	0
Legia Warsaw	2020–21	Ekstraklasa	25	0	3	0	—		1 (Note: Appearance in UEFA Champions League)	0	1 (Note: Appearance in Polish Super Cup)	0	30	0
Legia Warsaw	2021–22	Ekstraklasa	11	0	1	0	—		13 (Note: Six appearances in UEFA Champions League, seven appearances in UEFA Europa League)	0	1	0	26	0
Legia Warsaw	Total		94	2	10	0	0	0	22	0	2	0	128	2
Hapoel Be'er Sheva	2021–22	Israeli Premier League	16	1	3	0	0	0	0	0	0	0	19	1
Hapoel Be'er Sheva	2022–23	Israeli Premier League	7	0	1	0	0	0	4 (Note: Appearances in UEFA Europa Conference League)	0	1 (Note: Appearance in Israel Super Cup)	0	13	0
Hapoel Be'er Sheva	Total		23	1	4	0	0	0	4	0	1	0	32	1
Career total			264	9	34	2	8	0	54	0	3	0	363	11

== Honours ==
Sporting CP

- Taça de Portugal: 2014–15

Olympiacos

- Super League Greece: 2016–17

Legia Warsaw

- Ekstraklasa: 2019–20, 2020–21

Hapoel Be'er Sheva

- Israel State Cup: 2021–22
- Israel Super Cup: 2022
