= Artur Jędrzejczyk =

Polish footballer (born 1987)

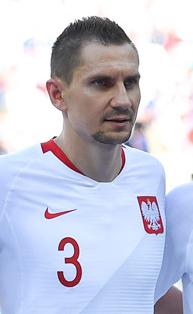
- Jędrzejczyk lining up for Poland at the 2018 FIFA World Cup

Personal information
- Full name: Artur Marcin Jędrzejczyk
- Date of birth: 4 November 1987 (age 39)
- Place of birth: Dębica, Poland
- Height: 1.89 m (6 ft 2 in)
- Position: Defender

Senior career*
Years	Team	Apps	(Gls)
2005–2006	Igloopol Dębica		
2006–2013	Legia Warsaw	71	(3)
2007–2008	→ GKS Jastrzębie (loan)	23	(0)
2008–2009	→ Dolcan Ząbki (loan)	28	(2)
2009–2010	→ Korona Kielce (loan)	11	(1)
2013–2017	Krasnodar	60	(1)
2016	→ Legia Warsaw (loan)	16	(1)
2017–2026	Legia Warsaw	214	(5)
2026	Legia Warsaw	1	(0)

International career
2010–2022	Poland	41	(3)
- * Club domestic league appearances and goals as of 20:28, 28 August 2026 (UTC)

Artur Marcin Jędrzejczyk (Polish: [ˈartur jɛndˈʐɛjtʂɨk]; born 4 November 1987) is a Polish former professional footballer who played as a defender.

== Club career ==
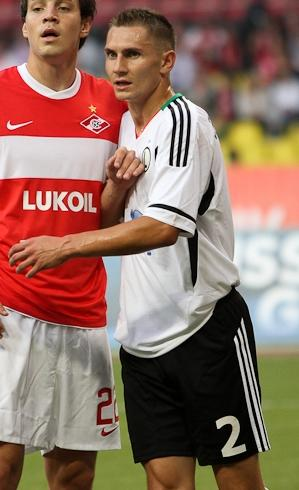
Jędrzejczyk with Legia in 2011

Jędrzejczyk joined Legia Warsaw in August 2006 from Igloopol Dębica. He spent two seasons on loan in the lower leagues, then returned to Legia for the 2009–10 season.

On 7 August 2010, he scored a hat-trick against Arsenal in a friendly match. The match ended with a 6–5 win for Arsenal.

On 30 May 2013, Jędrzejczyk signed a three-year contract with FC Krasnodar, extending it by two years in December 2014.

On 30 December 2016, he returned to Legia Warsaw. On 19 June 2026, it was announced Jędrzejczyk would leave the club at the end of the season. In August, he rejoined Legia for a farewell match, a league game against Śląsk Wrocław on 28 August. He was substituted after kick-off to a guard of honour from both teams; the match ended in a 1–1 draw.

In total, across four stints, Jędrzejczyk made 420 appearances for Legia in all competitions, second-most behind Lucjan Brychczy. He left Legia as the most decorated player in the club's history, with six league titles, seven Polish Cups and one Polish Super Cup. His jersey number 55 was retired by the club in August 2026.

== International career ==
On 12 October 2010, he debuted for the Poland national team in a friendly match against Ecuador. The match ended in a 2–2 draw.

Jędrzejczyk has represented Poland at Euro 2016, appearing in all five games as a starting left-back, on their run to the quarter-final. He formed the defense together with his Legia Warsaw teammate, Michal Pazdan.

In June 2018, he was named in Poland's 23-man squad for the 2018 FIFA World Cup in Russia.

== Career statistics ==
=== Club ===
As of match played 28 August 2026

Appearances and goals by club, season and competition
Club	Season	League			National cup (Note: Includes Polish Cup, Russian Cup)		Continental		Other		Total	
Club	Season	Division	Apps	Goals	Apps	Goals	Apps	Goals	Apps	Goals	Apps	Goals
Legia Warsaw	2006–07	Ekstraklasa	1	0	0	0	—		4 (Note: Three appearances in Ekstraklasa Cup, one appearance in Polish Super Cup)	0	5	0
Legia Warsaw	2009–10	Ekstraklasa	4	1	2	0	1 (Note: Appearance(s) in UEFA Europa League)	0	—		7	1
Legia Warsaw	2010–11	Ekstraklasa	14	0	1	0	—		—		15	0
Legia Warsaw	2011–12	Ekstraklasa	27	0	5	0	10	0	—		42	0
Legia Warsaw	2012–13	Ekstraklasa	25	2	8	1	5	0	1 (Note: Appearance in Polish Super Cup)	0	39	3
Legia Warsaw	Total		71	3	16	1	16	0	5	0	108	4
GKS Jastrzębie (loan)	2007–08	I liga	23	0	0	0	—		—		23	0
Dolcan Ząbki (loan)	2008–09	I liga	28	2	0	0	—		—		28	2
Korona Kielce (loan)	2009–10	Ekstraklasa	11	1	2	0	—		—		13	1
Krasnodar	2013–14	Russian Premier League	27	1	3	0	—		—		30	1
Krasnodar	2014–15	Russian Premier League	14	0	2	0	9	0	—		25	0
Krasnodar	2015–16	Russian Premier League	6	0	2	0	7	0	—		15	0
Krasnodar	2016–17	Russian Premier League	13	0	0	0	8	1	—		21	1
Krasnodar	Total		60	1	7	0	24	0	—		91	2
Legia Warsaw (loan)	2015–16	Ekstraklasa	16	1	1	0	—		—		17	1
Legia Warsaw	2016–17	Ekstraklasa	16	1	—		—		—		16	1
Legia Warsaw	2017–18	Ekstraklasa	20	0	4	0	6 (Note: Four appearances in UEFA Champions League, two appearances in UEFA Europa League)	0	1	0	31	0
Legia Warsaw	2018–19	Ekstraklasa	31	3	3	0	—		—		34	3
Legia Warsaw	2019–20	Ekstraklasa	29	0	4	0	8	0	—		41	0
Legia Warsaw	2020–21	Ekstraklasa	27	0	4	0	4 (Note: Two appearances in UEFA Champions League, two appearances in UEFA Europa League)	0	—		35	0
Legia Warsaw	2021–22	Ekstraklasa	19	0	2	0	12 (Note: Six appearances in UEFA Champions League, six appearances in UEFA Europa League)	0	—		33	0
Legia Warsaw	2022–23	Ekstraklasa	26	0	4	0	—		—		30	0
Legia Warsaw	2023–24	Ekstraklasa	21	0	2	0	11 (Note: Appearances in UEFA Conference League)	0	1	0	35	0
Legia Warsaw	2024–25	Ekstraklasa	13	0	1	0	8	1	—		22	1
Legia Warsaw	2025–26	Ekstraklasa	12	1	0	0	5 (Note: Two appearances in UEFA Europa League, three appearances in UEFA Conference League)	0	0	0	17	1
Legia Warsaw	Total		214	5	24	0	54	1	2	0	294	6
Legia Warsaw	2026–27	Ekstraklasa	1	0	—		—		—		1	0
Career total			424	13	50	1	94	2	7	0	575	16

=== International ===
Appearances and goals by national team and year
National team	Year	Apps	Goals
Poland	2010	1	0
Poland	2012	1	1
Poland	2013	8	0
Poland	2014	4	1
Poland	2015	1	0
Poland	2016	12	1
Poland	2017	5	0
Poland	2018	6	0
Poland	2019	1	0
Poland	2022	1	0
Total		40	3

Scores and results list Poland's goal tally first, score column indicates score after each Jędrzejczyk goal.

List of international goals scored by Artur Jędrzejczyk
No.	Date	Venue	Cap	Opponent	Score	Result	Competition
1	14 December 2012	Mardan Sports Complex, Aksu, Turkey	2	North Macedonia	3–0	4–1	Friendly
2	18 November 2014	Stadion Miejski, Wrocław, Poland	15	Switzerland	1–1	2–2	Friendly
3	1 June 2016	Stadion Energa Gdańsk, Gdańsk, Poland	18	Netherlands	1–1	1–2	Friendly

== Honours ==
Legia Warsaw

- Ekstraklasa: 2012–13, 2015–16, 2016–17, 2017–18, 2019–20, 2020–21
- Polish Cup: 2010–11, 2011–12, 2012–13, 2015–16, 2017–18, 2022–23, 2024–25
- Polish Super Cup: 2023

Individual

- Ekstraklasa Player of the Year: 2018
- Ekstraklasa Defender of the Season: 2012–13, 2019–20
