= Jan Grzesik =

Polish footballer

Personal information
- Date of birth: 21 October 1994 (age 32)
- Place of birth: Olesno, Poland
- Height: 1.78 m (5 ft 10 in)
- Position: Right-back

Team information
- Current team: Radomiak Radom
- Number: 13

Youth career
- 2003–2008: Małapanew Ozimek
- 2008–2009: OKS Olesno
- 2009–2010: GKP Targówek
- 2011–2012: Polonia Warsaw
- 2012–2013: Legia Warsaw

Senior career*
Years	Team	Apps	(Gls)
2013–2015	Legia Warsaw II	12	(1)
2013–2014	→ Zagłębie Sosnowiec (loan)	18	(0)
2015	→ Pogoń Siedlce (loan)	12	(0)
2015	→ Pogoń Siedlce II (loan)	2	(0)
2015–2016	Nadwiślan Góra	16	(0)
2016–2018	Siarka Tarnobrzeg	73	(3)
2018–2020	ŁKS Łódź	59	(1)
2020–2023	Warta Poznań	91	(10)
2023–	Radomiak Radom	108	(19)
- * Club domestic league appearances and goals as of 13:16, 8 November 2026 (UTC)

Jan Grzesik (born 21 October 1994) is a Polish professional footballer who plays as a right-back for Radomiak Radom.

== Club career ==
On 25 August 2020, he signed with Warta Poznań.

On 2 June 2023, Grzesik signed a two-year deal with another Ekstraklasa side Radomiak Radom.

== Honours ==
Individual

- I liga Team of the Season: 2018–19
