= Mateusz Cholewiak =

Polish footballer (born 1990)

Personal information
- Full name: Mateusz Cholewiak
- Date of birth: 5 February 1990 (age 36)
- Place of birth: Krosno, Poland
- Height: 1.83 m (6 ft 0 in)
- Positions: Left winger; left-back

Team information
- Current team: Puszcza Niepołomice
- Number: 10

Youth career
- –2007: MOSiR Jasło

Senior career*
| Years | Team | Apps | (Gls) |
| 2007–2011 | UKS SMS Łódź | 62 | (19) |
| 2011–2014 | Puszcza Niepołomice | 65 | (14) |
| 2014–2018 | Stal Mielec | 99 | (20) |
| 2018–2020 | Śląsk Wrocław | 57 | (7) |
| 2020–2021 | Legia Warsaw | 18 | (2) |
| 2020–2021 | Legia Warsaw II | 8 | (0) |
| 2021–2023 | Górnik Zabrze | 48 | (1) |
| 2023– | Puszcza Niepołomice | 77 | (8) |
- * Club domestic league appearances and goals as of 20:30, 26 May 2026 (UTC)

Mateusz Cholewiak (born 5 February 1990) is a Polish professional footballer who plays as a left winger or a left back for I liga club Puszcza Niepołomice.

== Club career ==
Cholewiak's first youth team was in Jasło, close to his birthplace of Krosno. In 2007 Cholewiak moved to UKS SMS Łódź, a team known for its focus and development on youth players. After 4 seasons with SMS Łódź, Cholewiak moved to Puszcza Niepołomice While with Puszcza, the team finished 2nd in the II liga East and achieved a historic promotion, with promotion to the I liga for the first time in their history. After being unable to help Puszcza avoid relegation in 2013-14, he joined Stal Mielec at the end of the season. Cholewiak spent 3 1/2 seasons with Stal, during that time he amassed nearly 100 league appearances with the club, while also scoring 20 goals. In January 2018 Cholewiak moved to Śląsk Wrocław to play in the Ekstraklasa for the first time.

== Honours ==
Stal Mielec

- II liga: 2015–16

Śląsk Wrocław II

- IV liga Lower Silesia East: 2018–19

Legia Warsaw

- Ekstraklasa: 2019–20, 2020–21
