= Ekstraklasa Awards =

Polish football awards

- Sport: Association football
- Competition: Ekstraklasa
- Awarded for: Best players of each Ekstraklasa season
- Country: Poland

History
- First award: 2009
- Editions: 18
- First winner: Robert Lewandowski (POL); (2010)
- Most wins: Kamil Grosicki (POL); (2 times)
- Most recent: Bartosz Nowak (POL); (2026)

The Ekstraklasa Awards are awarded every year to the best footballers of Ekstraklasa.

== History and regulations ==
The awards are given out during a post-season event named Gala Ekstraklasy (The Ekstraklasa Gala), held days after the final matchday. Awards for the best player and the biggest discovery of the Ekstraklasa season were first introduced in 2010. An award for the best coach was introduced one year later. In 2013, positional awards were given for the first time. The ‘Discovery of the Season’ award was discontinued after 2018 and then replaced with the ‘Young Player of the Season’ award.

While the Player of the Season award is given on the basis of a vote by footballers playing in Ekstraklasa, the Young Player of the Season is chosen by the sponsor of the league (currently PKO Bank Polski), and the positional and coach award winners are chosen by a panel of journalists.

Since the 2006–07 season, an award for the top scorer of the passing season is also presented during the gala.

== Main categories ==
Season	Player of the Season	Young Player of the Season	Goalkeeper of the Season	Defender of the Season	Midfielder of the Season	Forward of the Season	Coach of the Season	Goal of the Season	Discovery of the Season	Save of the Season	Ref
2008–09	–	–	–	–	–	–	–	(Poland) Robert Lewandowski (Lech)	–	–	
2009–10	(Poland) Robert Lewandowski (Lech)	–	–	–	–	–	–	–	(Poland) Artur Sobiech (Ruch)	–	
2010–11	(Poland) Adrian Mierzejewski (Polonia Warsaw)	–	–	–	–	–	(Poland) Orest Lenczyk (Śląsk)	–	(Israel) Maor Melikson (Wisła Kraków)	–	
2011–12	(Poland) Arkadiusz Piech (Ruch)	–	–	–	–	–	(Poland) Waldemar Fornalik (Ruch)	–	(Poland) Rafał Wolski (Legia)	–	
2012–13	(Slovakia) Róbert Demjan (Podbeskidzie)	–	(Lithuania) Emilijus Zubas (Bełchatów)	(Poland) Artur Jędrzejczyk (Legia)	(Poland) Sebastian Mila (Śląsk)	(Slovakia) Róbert Demjan (Podbeskidzie)	(Poland) Jan Urban (Legia)	(Poland) Przemysław Kaźmierczak (Śląsk)	(Poland) Bartosz Bereszyński (Lech & Legia)	–	
2013–14	(Serbia) Miroslav Radović (Legia)	–	(Slovakia) Dušan Kuciak (Legia)	(Poland) Arkadiusz Głowacki (Wisła Kraków)	(Serbia) Miroslav Radović (Legia)	(Poland) Marcin Robak (Piast & Pogoń)	(Slovakia) Ján Kocian (Ruch)	(Poland) Marcin Malinowski (Ruch)	(Poland) Michał Masłowski (Zawisza)	(Poland) Krzysztof Baran (Jagiellonia)	
2014–15	(Poland) Kamil Wilczek (Piast)	–	(Poland) Bartłomiej Drągowski (Jagiellonia)	(Poland) Michał Pazdan (Jagiellonia)	(Bosnia and Herzegovina) Semir Štilić (Wisła Kraków)	(Poland) Kamil Wilczek (Piast)	(Poland) Michał Probierz (Jagiellonia)	–	(Poland) Bartłomiej Drągowski (Jagiellonia)	–	
2015–16	(Hungary) Nemanja Nikolić (Legia)	–	(Poland) Jakub Szmatuła (Piast)	(Slovakia) Patrik Mráz (Piast)	(Poland) Rafał Murawski (Pogoń)	(Hungary) Nemanja Nikolić (Legia)	(Czech Republic) Radoslav Látal (Piast)	(Poland) Jarosław Fojut (Pogoń)	(Poland) Bartosz Kapustka (Cracovia)	(Poland) Radosław Cierzniak (Wisła Kraków)	
2016–17	(Belgium) Vadis Odjidja-Ofoe (Legia)	–	(Slovakia) Matúš Putnocký (Lech)	(Poland) Maciej Dąbrowski (Legia)	(Belgium) Vadis Odjidja-Ofoe (Legia)	(Poland) Marcin Robak (Lech)	(Poland) Maciej Bartoszek (Korona)	–	(Poland) Jarosław Niezgoda (Legia & Ruch)	–	
2017–18	(Spain) Carlitos López (Wisła Kraków)	–	(Poland) Arkadiusz Malarz (Legia)	(Poland) Michał Helik (Cracovia)	(Poland) Rafał Kurzawa (Górnik)	(Spain) Carlitos López (Wisła Kraków)	(Poland) Marcin Brosz (Górnik)	–	(Poland) Szymon Żurkowski (Górnik)	–	
2018–19	(Ecuador) Joel Valencia (Piast)	(Poland) Patryk Dziczek (Piast)	(Slovakia) František Plach (Piast)	(Serbia) Aleksandar Sedlar (Piast)	(Ecuador) Joel Valencia (Piast)	(Spain) Igor Angulo (Górnik)	(Poland) Waldemar Fornalik (Piast)	–	–	–	
2019–20	(Spain) Jorge Félix (Piast)	(Poland) Michał Karbownik (Legia)	(Slovakia) Dušan Kuciak (Lechia)	(Poland) Artur Jędrzejczyk (Legia)	(Croatia) Domagoj Antolić (Legia)	(Denmark) Christian Gytkjaer (Lech)	(Serbia) Aleksandar Vuković (Legia)	–	–	–	
2020–21	(Serbia) Filip Mladenović (Legia)	(Poland) Kamil Piątkowski (Raków)	(Croatia) Dante Stipica (Pogoń)	(Serbia) Filip Mladenović (Legia)	(Brazil) Luquinhas (Legia)	(Czech Republic) Tomáš Pekhart (Legia)	(Poland) Marek Papszun (Raków)	(Spain) Jesús Imaz (Jagiellonia)	–	–	
2021–22	(Spain) Ivi López (Raków)	(Poland) Jakub Kamiński (Lech)	(Serbia) Vladan Kovačević (Raków)	(Poland) Bartosz Salamon (Lech)	(Spain) Ivi López (Raków)	(Sweden) Mikael Ishak (Lech)	(Poland) Maciej Skorża (Lech)	(Poland) Fabian Piasecki (Śląsk)	–	–	
2022–23	(Poland) Kamil Grosicki (Pogoń)	(Poland) Ariel Mosór (Piast)	(Serbia) Vladan Kovačević (Raków)	(Croatia) Fran Tudor (Raków)	(Portugal) Josué Pesqueira (Legia)	(Spain) Marc Gual (Jagiellonia)	(Poland) Marek Papszun (Raków)	(Poland) Fabian Piasecki (Raków)	–	–	
2023–24	(Poland) Kamil Grosicki (Pogoń)	(Poland) Dominik Marczuk (Jagiellonia)	(Poland) Mateusz Kochalski (Stal Mielec)	(Poland) Bartłomiej Wdowik (Jagiellonia)	(Poland) Kamil Grosicki (Pogoń)	(Spain) Erik Expósito (Śląsk)	(Poland) Adrian Siemieniec (Jagiellonia)	–	–	–	
2024–25	(Greece) Efthymis Koulouris (Pogoń)	(Poland) Kacper Trelowski (Raków)	(Poland) Bartosz Mrozek (Lech)	(Poland) Mateusz Skrzypczak (Jagiellonia)	(Portugal) Afonso Sousa (Lech)	(Greece) Efthymis Koulouris (Pogoń)	(Denmark) Niels Frederiksen (Lech)	–	–	–	
2025–26	(Poland) Bartosz Nowak (Katowice)	(Poland) Marcel Reguła (Zagłębie L.)	(Poland) Xavier Dziekoński (Korona)	(Poland) Wojciech Mońka (Lech)	(Poland) Bartosz Nowak (Katowice)	(Poland) Karol Czubak (Motor)	(Denmark) Niels Frederiksen (Lech)	–	–	–	
