= 2018–19 Ekstraklasa =

93rd season of top-tier football league in Poland

Ekstraklasa
- Season: 2018–19
- Dates: 20 July 2018 – 19 May 2019
- Champions: Piast Gliwice (1st title)
- Relegated: Miedź Legnica; Zagłębie Sosnowiec
- Champions League: Piast Gliwice
- Europa League: Legia Warsaw; Lechia Gdańsk; Cracovia
- Matches: 296
- Goals: 823 (2.78 per match)
- Top goalscorer: Igor Angulo (24 goals)
- Biggest home win: Lech 4–0 Zagłębie S. (12 August 2018); Zagłębie L. 4–0 Śląsk (14 September 2018); Pogoń 4–0 Wisła P. (6 October 2018); Legia 4–0 Górnik (3 November 2018); Lechia 4–0 Górnik (22 December 2018); Piast 4–0 Lech (15 February 2019); Wisła K. 4–0 Legia (31 March 2019)
- Biggest away win: Zagłębie S. 0–6 Lech (16 December 2018)
- Highest scoring: Wisła K. 4–5 Miedź (18 May 2019)
- Longest winning run: 7 matches Cracovia
- Longest unbeaten run: 13 matches Lechia Gdańsk
- Longest winless run: 9 matches Górnik Zabrze; Miedź Legnica; Zagłębie Sosnowiec
- Longest losing run: 5 matches Zagłębie Sosnowiec
- Highest attendance: 33,000; Wisła K. 4–0 Legia (31 March 2019)
- Lowest attendance: 0 (Note: Matches have been played behind closed doors without any spectators.); Lech 2–0 Cracovia (29 July 2018); Lech 4–0 Zagłębie S. (12 August 2018)
- Total attendance: 2,607,154
- Average attendance: 8,808 ▼6.7%

The 2018–19 Ekstraklasa (also known as Lotto Ekstraklasa due to its sponsorship by Totalizator Sportowy, Polish lottery) was the 93rd season of the Polish Football Championship, the 85th season of the highest tier domestic division in the Polish football league system since its establishment in 1927 and the 11th season of the Ekstraklasa under its current title. The league was operated by the Ekstraklasa SA.

The season started on 20 July 2018 and concluded on 19 May 2019. It is the second Ekstraklasa season to use VAR. After the 20th matchday the league went on a winter break between 23 December 2018 and 8 February 2019. The regular season was played as a round-robin tournament. A total of 16 teams participated, 14 of which competed in the league during the 2017–18 season, while the remaining two were promoted from the 2017–18 I liga. The fixtures were announced on 22 March 2018.

Each team played a total of 30 matches, half at home and half away. After the 30th round (in the beginning of April 2019), the league was split into two groups: championship round (top eight teams) and relegation round (bottom eight teams). Each team played 7 more games (teams ranked 1 to 4 and 9 to 12 played four times at home). Therefore, each team played a total of 37 matches. The team at the top of the Championship round won the league title. The two teams at the bottom of the Relegation round were relegated to 2019–20 I liga. This was the sixth season to take place since the new playoff structure has been introduced.

The defending champions were Legia Warsaw, who won their 13th Polish title the previous season. Piast Gliwice succeeded Legia, winning its first ever Polish top league title.

== Teams ==
Sixteen teams competed in the league – the top fourteen teams from the previous season, as well as two teams promoted from the I liga. Miedź Legnica were promoted to the Ekstraklasa for the first time. Zagłębie Sosnowiec made a return to the Ekstraklasa for the first time since 2008.

=== Stadiums and locations ===
Note: Table lists in alphabetical order.

Team	Location	Venue	Capacity
Arka Gdynia	Gdynia	Stadion GOSiR	15,139
Cracovia	Kraków	Stadion im. Józefa Piłsudskiego	15,016
Górnik Zabrze	Zabrze	Stadion im. Ernesta Pohla	24,413^{2}
Jagiellonia Białystok	Białystok	Stadion Jagiellonii	22,432
Korona Kielce	Kielce	Suzuki Arena	15,550
Lech Poznań	Poznań	Stadion Lecha	43,269
Lechia Gdańsk	Gdańsk	Stadion Energa Gdańsk	43,615
Legia Warsaw	Warsaw	Stadion Wojska Polskiego	31,800
Miedź Legnica	Legnica	Stadion im. Orła Białego	6,244
Piast Gliwice	Gliwice	Arena Gliwice	10,037
Pogoń Szczecin	Szczecin	Stadion im. Floriana Krygiera	18,027
Śląsk Wrocław	Wrocław	Stadion Wrocław	42,771
Wisła Kraków	Kraków	Stadion im. Henryka Reymana	33,326
Wisła Płock	Płock	Stadion im. Kazimierza Górskiego	12,800
Zagłębie Lubin	Lubin	Stadion Zagłębia	16,068
Zagłębie Sosnowiec	Sosnowiec	Stadion Ludowy	7,500 (4,900 seats)

1. Upgrading to 31,871.

Arka	Cracovia	Górnik Zabrze	Jagiellonia	Korona	Lech
Stadion GOSiR	Stadion im. Józefa Piłsudskiego	Stadion im. Ernesta Pohla	Stadion Jagiellonii	Suzuki Arena	Stadion Lecha
Capacity: 15,139	Capacity: 15,016	Capacity: 24,413	Capacity: 22,432	Capacity: 15,550	Capacity: 43,269
Lechia	Location of teams in 2018–19 Ekstraklasa				Legia
Stadion Energa Gdańsk	Location of teams in 2018–19 Ekstraklasa				Stadion Wojska Polskiego
Capacity: 43,615	Location of teams in 2018–19 Ekstraklasa				Capacity: 31,800
Miedź	Location of teams in 2018–19 Ekstraklasa				Piast
Stadion im. Orła Białego	Location of teams in 2018–19 Ekstraklasa				Arena Gliwice
Capacity: 6,244	Location of teams in 2018–19 Ekstraklasa				Capacity: 10,037
Pogoń	Śląsk	Wisła Kraków	Wisła Płock	Zagłębie Lubin	Zagłębie Sosnowiec
Stadion im. Floriana Krygiera	Stadion Wrocław	Stadion im. Henryka Reymana	Stadion im. Kazimierza Górskiego	Stadion Zagłębia	Stadion Ludowy
Capacity: 18,027	Capacity: 42,771	Capacity: 33,326	Capacity: 12,800	Capacity: 16,068	Capacity: 7,500 (4,900 seats)

Location of teams in the Katowice urban area

=== Personnel and kits ===
Team	Chairman	Head coach	Captain	Manufacturer	Sponsors
Arka Gdynia	(Poland) Wojciech Pertkiewicz	(Poland) Jacek Zieliński	(Poland) Adam Marciniak	Adidas	LV Bet, Gdynia
Cracovia	(Poland) Janusz Filipiak	(Poland) Michał Probierz	(Poland) Janusz Gol	Nike	Comarch
Górnik Zabrze	(Poland) Bartosz Sarnowski	(Poland) Marcin Brosz	(Poland) Szymon Matuszek	Adidas	Allianz
Jagiellonia Białystok	(Poland) Cezary Kulesza	(Poland) Ireneusz Mamrot	(Poland) Taras Romanczuk	Erreà	STS, Wschodzący Białystok
Korona Kielce	(Poland) Krzysztof Zając	(Italy) Gino Lettieri	(Poland) Bartosz Rymaniak	Puma	Suzuki
Lech Poznań	(Poland) Karol Klimczak	(Poland) Dariusz Żuraw	(Portugal) Pedro Tiba	Macron	Aforti
Lechia Gdańsk	(Poland) Adam Mandziara	(Poland) Piotr Stokowiec	(Portugal) Flávio Paixão	New Balance	Energa, Paytren
Legia Warsaw	(Poland) Dariusz Mioduski	(Serbia) Aleksandar Vuković	(Serbia) Miroslav Radović	Adidas	Fortuna
Miedź Legnica	(Poland) Andrzej Dadełło	(Poland) Dominik Nowak	(Poland) Grzegorz Bartczak	Saller	DSA SA
Piast Gliwice	(Poland) Paweł Żelem	(Poland) Waldemar Fornalik	(Spain) Gerard Badía	Adidas	Gliwice
Pogoń Szczecin	(Poland) Jarosław Mroczek	(Germany) Kosta Runjaić	(Poland) Adam Frączczak	Zina	Grupa Azoty
Śląsk Wrocław	(Poland) Marcin Przychodny	(Czech Republic) Vítězslav Lavička	(Poland) Marcin Robak	Adidas	forBET
Wisła Kraków	(Poland) Rafał Wisłocki	(Poland) Maciej Stolarczyk	(Poland) Jakub Błaszczykowski	Adidas	LV Bet
Wisła Płock	(Poland) Jacek Kruszewski	(Poland) Leszek Ojrzyński	(Poland) Bartłomiej Sielewski	Adidas	PKN Orlen, Budmat
Zagłębie Lubin	(Poland) Mateusz Dróżdż	(Netherlands) Ben van Dael	(Slovakia) Ľubomír Guldan	Nike	KGHM
Zagłębie Sosnowiec	(Poland) Marcin Jaroszewski	(Lithuania) Valdas Ivanauskas	(Poland) Tomasz Nowak	Patrick	Banimex, Nelro Data

=== Managerial changes ===
Team	Outgoing manager	Manner of departure	Date of vacancy	Position in table	Incoming manager	Date of appointment
Lech Poznań	(Poland) Rafał Ulatowski	Caretaking spell over	21 May 2018	Pre-season	(Serbia) Ivan Đurđević	21 May 2018
Arka Gdynia	(Poland) Leszek Ojrzyński	End of contract	21 May 2018	Pre-season	(Poland) Zbigniew Smółka	8 June 2018
Wisła Kraków	(Spain) Joan Carrillo	Mutual consent	12 June 2018	Pre-season	(Poland) Maciej Stolarczyk	18 June 2018
Wisła Płock	(Poland) Jerzy Brzęczek	Resigned	12 July 2018	Pre-season	(Poland) Dariusz Dźwigała	14 July 2018
Legia Warsaw	(Croatia) Dean Klafurić	Sacked	1 August 2018	9th	(Serbia) Aleksandar Vuković (interim)	1 August 2018
Legia Warsaw	(Serbia) Aleksandar Vuković	Caretaking spell over	13 August 2018	6th	(Portugal) Ricardo Sá Pinto	13 August 2018
Wisła Płock	(Poland) Dariusz Dźwigała	Sacked	7 October 2018	13th	(Spain) Kibu Vicuña	10 October 2018
Zagłębie Sosnowiec	(Poland) Dariusz Dudek	Resigned	8 October 2018	16th	(Lithuania) Valdas Ivanauskas	15 October 2018
Zagłębie Lubin	(Poland) Mariusz Lewandowski	Mutual consent	29 October 2018	6th	(Netherlands) Ben van Dael	29 October 2018
Lech Poznań	(Serbia) Ivan Đurđević	Sacked	4 November 2018	7th	(Poland) Dariusz Żuraw (interim)	5 November 2018
Lech Poznań	(Poland) Dariusz Żuraw	Caretaking spell over	25 November 2018	8th	(Poland) Adam Nawałka	25 November 2018
Śląsk Wrocław	(Poland) Tadeusz Pawłowski	Sacked	11 December 2018	14th	(Poland) Paweł Barylski (interim)	11 December 2018
Śląsk Wrocław	(Poland) Paweł Barylski	Caretaking spell over	3 January 2019	14th	(Czech Republic) Vítězslav Lavička	3 January 2019
Lech Poznań	(Poland) Adam Nawałka	Sacked	31 March 2019	9th	(Poland) Dariusz Żuraw	1 April 2019
Legia Warsaw	(Portugal) Ricardo Sá Pinto	Sacked	1 April 2019	2nd	(Serbia) Aleksandar Vuković	2 April 2019
Arka Gdynia	(Poland) Zbigniew Smółka	Sacked	1 April 2019	14th	(Poland) Jacek Zieliński	12 April 2019
Wisła Płock	(Spain) Kibu Vicuña	Sacked	3 April 2019	15th	(Poland) Leszek Ojrzyński	4 April 2019

== Regular season ==
=== League table ===
Pos	Team	Pld	W	D	L	GF	GA	GD	Pts	Qualification
1	Lechia Gdańsk	30	17	9	4	45	25	+20	60 (Note: Head-to-head record: Legia Warsaw 0–0 Lechia Gdańsk, Lechia Gdańsk 0–0 Legia Warsaw. Goal difference: Lechia Gdańsk (+20), Legia Warsaw (+17))	Qualification for the Championship round
2	Legia Warsaw	30	18	6	6	48	31	+17	60	Qualification for the Championship round
3	Piast Gliwice	30	15	8	7	47	31	+16	53	Qualification for the Championship round
4	Cracovia	30	14	6	10	39	34	+5	48	Qualification for the Championship round
5	Zagłębie Lubin	30	14	5	11	48	38	+10	47 (Note: Head-to-head record: Zagłębie Lubin 0–2 Jagiellonia Białystok, Jagiellonia Białystok 0–4 Zagłębie Lubin.)	Qualification for the Championship round
6	Jagiellonia Białystok	30	13	8	9	45	41	+4	47	Qualification for the Championship round
7	Pogoń Szczecin	30	12	7	11	44	42	+2	43 (Note: Head-to-head record: Pogoń Szczecin 3–0 Lech Poznań, Lech Poznań 3–2 Pogoń Szczecin.)	Qualification for the Championship round
8	Lech Poznań	30	13	4	13	41	40	+1	43	Qualification for the Championship round
9	Wisła Kraków	30	12	6	12	55	48	+7	42	Qualification for the Relegation round
10	Korona Kielce	30	10	10	10	35	44	−9	40	Qualification for the Relegation round
11	Miedź Legnica	30	8	8	14	30	52	−22	32	Qualification for the Relegation round
12	Górnik Zabrze	30	7	10	13	36	49	−13	31 (Note: Head-to-head record: Górnik Zabrze 2–2 Śląsk Wrocław, Śląsk Wrocław 0–1 Górnik Zabrze.)	Qualification for the Relegation round
13	Śląsk Wrocław	30	8	7	15	35	37	−2	31	Qualification for the Relegation round
14	Wisła Płock	30	7	9	14	40	49	−9	30	Qualification for the Relegation round
15	Arka Gdynia	30	6	11	13	39	44	−5	29	Qualification for the Relegation round
16	Zagłębie Sosnowiec	30	6	6	18	41	63	−22	24	Qualification for the Relegation round

Source: Ekstraklasa, 90minut
Rules for classification: 1) Points; 2) Head-to-head points; 3) Head-to-head goal difference; 4) Head-to-head goals scored; 5) Head-to-head away goals scored (only if two teams); 6) Goal difference; 7) Goals scored; 8) Fairplay ranking; 9) Draw. (Note: Head-to-head record is used only after all the matches between the teams in question have been played.)

=== Positions by round ===
Team ╲ Round	1	2	3	4	5	6	7	8	9	10	11	12	13	14	15	16	17	18	19	20	21	22	23	24	25	26	27	28	29	30
Lechia	5	5	6	4	3	1	1	2	2	3	1	2	1	1	1	1	1	1	1	1	1	1	1	1	1	1	1	1	1	1
Legia	15	9	10	5	4	8	8	6	4	4	2	3	3	3	3	2	2	2	2	2	2	2	2	2	2	2	2	2	2	2
Piast	3	2	1	3	5	3	5	4	6	2	5	5	5	4	5	5	4	4	5	6	6	5	4	4	3	3	3	3	3	3
Cracovia	15	16	15	15	14	15	16	16	16	16	16	15	12	13	13	13	12	10	11	9	8	8	7	7	6	7	4	4	4	4
Zagłębie L.	1	1	3	8	6	4	6	5	5	8	8	9	9	10	11	12	10	11	10	11	10	10	10	9	9	10	8	5	5	5
Jagiellonia	13	7	4	2	2	2	4	3	1	1	4	1	2	2	2	3	3	3	3	4	3	3	3	3	4	5	6	6	6	6
Pogoń	13	15	16	16	15	16	15	15	14	13	10	10	10	8	7	7	7	6	8	5	7	6	8	6	7	4	5	7	7	7
Lech	3	2	2	1	1	5	3	7	8	7	7	6	6	7	8	8	8	7	4	3	5	7	5	5	5	6	9	8	8	8
Wisła K.	9	5	9	9	7	6	2	1	3	6	3	4	4	5	4	6	6	8	7	8	9	9	9	10	10	9	7	9	9	9
Korona	7	11	8	5	8	7	7	8	7	5	6	7	7	6	6	4	5	5	6	7	4	4	6	8	8	8	10	10	10	10
Miedź	5	8	12	13	12	9	9	9	9	11	12	12	15	14	15	15	15	13	12	12	13	13	13	14	12	13	13	12	12	11
Górnik Z.	7	10	5	7	9	11	11	10	12	14	14	16	14	15	14	14	14	15	15	15	14	14	14	13	14	12	12	14	14	12
Śląsk	1	4	7	10	11	12	13	14	11	9	11	11	11	11	12	11	13	14	14	14	12	12	12	12	11	11	11	11	11	13
Wisła P.	11	11	14	14	16	13	12	11	13	12	13	13	13	12	10	10	11	12	13	13	15	15	15	15	15	15	15	15	15	14
Arka	9	13	13	11	10	10	10	12	10	10	9	8	8	9	9	9	9	9	9	10	11	11	11	11	13	14	14	13	13	15
Zagłębie S.	11	14	11	12	13	14	14	13	15	15	15	14	16	16	16	16	16	16	16	16	16	16	16	16	16	16	16	16	16	16

=== Results ===
Home \ Away	ARK	CRA	GÓR	JAG	KOR	LPO	LGD	LEG	MLE	PIA	POG	ŚLĄ	WIS	WPŁ	ZAG	ZSO
Arka Gdynia	—	0–3	1–1	0–2	1–2	1–0	0–0	1–2	1–1	1–2	2–3	0–2	4–1	3–3	3–1	2–2
Cracovia	0–0	—	2–0	1–0	2–1	1–0	4–2	0–0	0–0	2–1	2–1	1–1	0–2	3–1	0–1	2–1
Górnik Zabrze	1–1	0–1	—	1–3	1–1	2–2	0–2	1–2	1–3	0–2	1–1	2–2	2–0	1–1	2–0	2–1
Jagiellonia Białystok	3–1	3–1	2–2	—	1–3	2–2	0–1	1–1	2–3	2–1	2–1	0–4	1–0	1–0	0–4	2–1
Korona Kielce	2–1	0–1	4–2	1–1	—	0–0	0–0	1–2	0–0	1–0	1–1	2–1	2–6	2–2	0–2	3–1
Lech Poznań	1–0	2–0	0–3	0–2	2–1	—	0–1	2–0	2–1	1–1	3–2	2–0	2–5	2–1	1–2	4–0
Lechia Gdańsk	2–1	1–0	4–0	3–2	2–0	1–0	—	0–0	2–0	2–0	2–1	1–1	1–0	1–1	3–3	4–1
Legia Warsaw	1–1	0–2	4–0	3–0	3–0	1–0	0–0	—	2–0	2–0	3–1	1–0	3–3	1–4	1–3	2–1
Miedź Legnica	0–4	2–1	1–3	0–3	1–1	3–2	0–0	1–4	—	2–2	1–0	0–5	2–0	2–1	2–0	0–2
Piast Gliwice	1–0	3–1	1–0	1–1	4–0	4–0	1–1	1–3	2–1	—	3–0	2–0	2–0	1–0	2–1	0–0
Pogoń Szczecin	3–3	1–1	3–1	0–0	1–1	3–0	2–3	2–1	2–0	0–2	—	2–1	2–1	4–0	0–3	1–0
Śląsk Wrocław	1–2	3–1	0–1	2–0	1–1	0–1	0–2	0–1	0–0	4–1	0–0	—	0–1	0–3	2–0	2–0
Wisła Kraków	0–0	3–2	3–0	2–2	0–1	0–1	5–2	4–0	2–1	2–2	2–3	1–0	—	1–1	3–2	2–2
Wisła Płock	1–3	3–2	0–4	1–1	1–2	1–2	1–0	0–1	2–2	1–1	0–2	2–0	1–2	—	0–1	2–0
Zagłębie Lubin	0–0	1–2	1–1	0–2	0–1	2–1	2–1	0–1	3–0	2–2	0–2	4–0	3–1	3–3	—	2–1
Zagłębie Sosnowiec	3–2	1–1	1–1	1–4	4–1	0–6	0–1	2–3	3–1	1–2	3–0	3–3	4–3	1–3	1–2	—

Source: 90minut.pl
Legend: Blue = home team win; Yellow = draw; Red = away team win.
For upcoming matches, an "a" indicates there is an article about the rivalry between the two participants.

=== Results by round ===
Team ╲ Round	1	2	3	4	5	6	7	8	9	10	11	12	13	14	15	16	17	18	19	20	21	22	23	24	25	26	27	28	29	30
Arka	L	D	L	D	W	L	D	L	W	D	W	W	L	L	W	W	L	L	D	D	L	L	L	L	L	D	L	D	D	D
Cracovia	L	L	D	D	L	L	D	L	W	D	L	W	W	D	L	D	W	W	W	W	W	W	W	L	W	L	W	W	L	W
Górnik	D	D	W	D	L	L	D	D	L	L	D	L	W	L	D	L	W	L	D	L	W	L	W	D	L	W	L	D	L	W
Jagiellonia	L	W	W	W	W	L	D	W	W	L	D	W	D	W	D	L	W	D	L	D	W	W	L	D	L	L	D	L	W	W
Korona	D	L	W	W	D	W	L	D	W	W	D	L	L	W	W	W	L	D	D	D	W	D	D	L	L	W	D	L	L	L
Lech	W	W	W	W	L	L	D	L	L	W	D	W	L	L	D	W	L	W	W	W	L	L	W	W	L	L	D	W	L	L
Lechia	W	D	D	W	W	W	W	L	D	L	W	D	W	W	W	W	W	D	D	W	W	D	W	L	D	W	W	D	W	L
Legia	L	W	D	W	W	L	D	W	W	D	W	D	D	W	L	W	W	D	W	W	W	L	L	W	W	W	L	W	W	W
Miedź	W	L	L	L	D	W	W	D	L	L	D	L	L	D	L	L	W	W	D	D	L	L	W	L	W	L	L	D	W	D
Piast	W	W	W	L	L	W	D	W	L	W	D	D	D	W	L	D	W	D	L	D	L	W	W	W	W	W	L	W	D	W
Pogoń	L	L	L	D	D	L	D	D	W	W	W	L	W	W	W	W	L	W	L	W	L	W	D	W	L	W	D	L	D	L
Śląsk	W	D	L	L	D	D	L	L	W	W	L	L	W	L	D	D	L	L	D	L	W	L	W	L	W	L	W	L	D	L
Wisła K.	D	W	L	D	W	W	W	W	L	L	W	D	D	L	W	L	L	D	W	D	L	W	L	L	W	W	W	L	D	L
Wisła P.	L	D	L	D	L	W	D	D	L	W	L	D	D	W	W	L	L	D	L	D	L	L	L	W	D	L	L	L	W	W
Zagłębie L.	W	W	L	L	W	W	L	W	D	L	L	D	L	L	L	L	W	D	W	L	W	W	L	W	W	D	W	D	W	W
Zagłębie S.	L	L	W	L	L	D	D	D	L	D	L	W	D	L	L	D	L	L	L	L	L	W	L	W	L	L	W	W	L	L

W = Win; D = Draw; L = Loss

== Play-offs ==
=== Championship round ===
==== League table ====
Pos	Team	Pld	W	D	L	GF	GA	GD	Pts	Qualification
1	Piast Gliwice (C)	37	21	9	7	57	33	+24	72	Qualification for the Champions League first qualifying round
2	Legia Warsaw	37	20	8	9	55	38	+17	68	Qualification for the Europa League first qualifying round
3	Lechia Gdańsk	37	19	10	8	54	38	+16	67	Qualification for the Europa League second qualifying round (Note: Lechia Gdańsk qualified for the Europa League second qualifying round by winning the 2018–19 Polish Cup.)
4	Cracovia	37	17	6	14	45	43	+2	57 (Note: Points in regular season: Cracovia 48 points, Jagiellonia Białystok 47 points.)	Qualification for the Europa League first qualifying round
5	Jagiellonia Białystok	37	16	9	12	55	52	+3	57	
6	Zagłębie Lubin	37	15	8	14	57	48	+9	53	
7	Pogoń Szczecin	37	14	10	13	57	54	+3	52 (Note: Head-to-head in regular season record: Pogoń Szczecin 3–0 Lech Poznań, Lech Poznań 3–2 Pogoń Szczecin.)	
8	Lech Poznań	37	15	7	15	49	48	+1	52	

Source: Ekstraklasa, 90minut
Rules for classification: 1) Points; 2) Points in regular season; 3) Head-to-head points in regular season; 4) Head-to-head goal difference in regular season; 5) Head-to-head goals scored in regular season; 5) Head-to-head away goals scored in regular season (if only two teams); 7) Goal difference; 8) Goals scored; 9) Fairplay ranking; 10) Play-off (only if needed to decide champion, teams for relegation or teams for UEFA competitions).
(C) Champions

==== Positions by round ====
Team ╲ Round	30	31	32	33	34	35	36	37
Piast	3	3	3	3	2	1	1	1
Legia	2	1	2	1	1	2	2	2
Lechia	1	2	1	2	3	3	3	3
Cracovia	4	5	5	5	5	4	4	4
Jagiellonia	6	4	4	4	4	5	5	5
Zagłębie L.	5	6	6	6	6	6	6	6
Pogoń	7	7	8	8	8	8	8	7
Lech	8	8	7	7	7	7	7	8

==== Results ====
Home \ Away	LGD	LEG	PIA	CRA	ZAG	JAG	POG	LPO
Lechia Gdańsk	—	1–3	0–2	—	1–1	2–0	—	—
Legia Warsaw	—	—	0–1	1–0	2–2	—	1–1	—
Piast Gliwice	—	—	—	3–1	1–0	2–1	—	1–0
Cracovia	2–0	—	—	—	—	0–1	0–3	1–0
Zagłębie Lubin	—	—	—	1–2	—	2–0	2–3	—
Jagiellonia Białystok	—	1–0	—	—	—	—	4–2	3–3
Pogoń Szczecin	3–4	—	0–0	—	—	—	—	1–1
Lech Poznań	2–1	1–0	—	—	1–1	—	—	—

Source: 90minut.pl
Legend: Blue = home team win; Yellow = draw; Red = away team win.
For upcoming matches, an "a" indicates there is an article about the rivalry between the two participants.

=== Relegation round ===
==== League table ====
Pos	Team	Pld	W	D	L	GF	GA	GD	Pts	Qualification
9	Wisła Kraków	37	14	7	16	67	63	+4	49	
10	Korona Kielce	37	12	11	14	42	54	−12	47	
11	Górnik Zabrze	37	12	10	15	48	53	−5	46	
12	Śląsk Wrocław	37	12	8	17	49	45	+4	44	
13	Arka Gdynia	37	10	12	15	49	51	−2	42	
14	Wisła Płock	37	10	11	16	50	58	−8	41	
15	Miedź Legnica (R)	37	10	10	17	40	65	−25	40	Relegation to I liga
16	Zagłębie Sosnowiec (R)	37	7	8	22	49	80	−31	29	Relegation to I liga

Source: Ekstraklasa, 90minut
Rules for classification: 1) Points; 2) Points in regular season; 3) Head-to-head points in regular season; 4) Head-to-head goal difference in regular season; 5) Head-to-head goals scored in regular season; 5) Head-to-head away goals scored in regular season (if only two teams); 7) Goal difference; 8) Goals scored; 9) Fairplay ranking; 10) Play-off (only if needed to decide champion, teams for relegation or teams for UEFA competitions).
(R) Relegated

==== Positions by round ====
Team ╲ Round	30	31	32	33	34	35	36	37
Wisła K.	9	10	10	9	9	9	9	9
Korona	10	9	9	10	10	10	10	10
Górnik	12	11	11	11	11	11	11	11
Śląsk	13	14	15	15	15	13	13	12
Arka	15	15	14	14	14	12	12	13
Wisła P.	14	12	12	13	13	15	14	14
Miedź	11	13	13	12	12	14	15	15
Zagłębie S.	16	16	16	16	16	16	16	16

==== Results ====
Home \ Away	KOR	WIS	GÓR	WPŁ	MIE	ŚLĄ	ARK	ZSO
Korona Kielce	—	—	0–3	—	0–0	2–0	0–2	—
Wisła Kraków	1–0	—	—	2–3	4–5	1–1	—	—
Górnik Zabrze	—	1–2	—	0–1	—	—	1–0	4–0
Wisła Płock	2–1	—	—	—	—	—	1–1	0–0
Miedź Legnica	—	—	0–1	3–2	—	0–2	—	2–2
Śląsk Wrocław	—	—	1–2	2–1	—	—	4–0	—
Arka Gdynia	—	3–1	—	—	2–0	—	—	2–0
Zagłębie Sosnowiec	2–4	2–1	—	—	—	2–4	—	—

Source: 90minut.pl
Legend: Blue = home team win; Yellow = draw; Red = away team win.
For upcoming matches, an "a" indicates there is an article about the rivalry between the two participants.

== Season statistics ==
=== Top goalscorers ===
Rank	Player	Club	Goals
1	(Spain) Igor Angulo	Górnik Zabrze	24
2	(Poland) Marcin Robak	Śląsk Wrocław	18
3	(Spain) Carlitos	Legia Warsaw	16
3	(Spain) Jesús Imaz	Jagiellonia Białystok	16
5	(Portugal) Flávio Paixão	Lechia Gdańsk	15
6	(Spain) Airam Cabrera	Cracovia	14
6	(Italy) Elia Soriano	Korona Kielce	14
8	(Finland) Petteri Forsell	Miedź Legnica	13
8	(Poland) Filip Starzyński	Zagłębie Lubin	13
10	(Denmark) Christian Gytkjær	Lech Poznań	12
10	(Croatia) Marko Kolar	Wisła Kraków	12

=== Top assists ===
Rank	Player	Club	Assists
1	(Serbia) Žarko Udovičić	Zagłębie Sosnowiec	11
2	(Spain) Jesús Jiménez	Górnik Zabrze	9
3	(Poland) Martin Konczkowski	Piast Gliwice	8
3	(Bosnia and Herzegovina) Zvonimir Kožulj	Pogoń Szczecin	8
3	(Serbia) Filip Mladenović	Lechia Gdańsk	8
6	(Poland) Dominik Furman	Wisła Płock	7
6	(Hungary) Dominik Nagy	Legia Warsaw	7
6	(Slovakia) Róbert Pich	Śląsk Wrocław	7
6	(Brazil) Guilherme Sityá	Jagiellonia Białystok	7
10	(Spain) Gerard Badía	Piast Gliwice	6

=== Hat-tricks ===
Player	For	Against	Result	Date	Ref
(Poland) Artur Sobiech	Lechia Gdańsk	Zagłębie Lubin	3–3 (H)	22 September 2018	
(Poland) Marcin Robak	Śląsk Wrocław	Jagiellonia Białystok	4–0 (A)	1 October 2018	
(Poland) Krzysztof Drzazga	Wisła Kraków	Korona Kielce	6–2 (A)	9 March 2019	

== Attendances ==
Pos	Team	Total	High	Low	Average	Change
1	Legia Warsaw	334,662	23,403	11,232	17,614	+1.6%
2	Wisła Kraków	303,420	33,000	8,229	15,969	+10.7%
3	Lechia Gdańsk	280,169	25,066	8,769	14,746	+36.7%
4	Górnik Zabrze	250,898	23,271	7,241	13,205	−30.2%
5	Lech Poznań	191,252	24,164	7,112	11,953	−42.2%^{2}
6	Jagiellonia Białystok	170,241	16,862	5,012	9,458	−13.9%
7	Śląsk Wrocław	163,171	20,084	3,710	9,065	−15.7%
8	Arka Gdynia	126,406	10,434	3,501	7,023	−13.7%
9	Cracovia	132,199	12,768	3,217	6,958	+42.9%
10	Korona Kielce	126,212	10,806	4,451	6,643	−11.7%
11	Pogoń Szczecin	116,333	15,319	3,689	6,463	−1.0%
12	Piast Gliwice	94,603	9,913	2,824	4,979	+12.7%
13	Miedź Legnica	94,250	5,934	3,949	4,961	+73.2%^{1}
14	Zagłębie Lubin	87,618	9,790	2,148	4,868	−21.0%
15	Wisła Płock	78,008	8,184	1,951	4,334	−13.3%
16	Zagłębie Sosnowiec	57,712	4,824	1,189	3,206	+45.0%^{1}
	League total	2,607,154	33,000	1,189	8,808	−7.0%

Source: 90minut (in Polish)
Notes:
1: Team played last season in I liga.
2: Lech Poznań stadium's stands were closed for spectators during two games. Those games were not included in the summary.

== Awards ==
=== Monthly awards ===
==== Player of the Month ====
Month	Player	Club
July 2018	(Poland) Piotr Celeban	Śląsk Wrocław
August 2018	(Czech Republic) Zdeněk Ondrášek	Wisła Kraków
September 2018	(Finland) Petteri Forsell	Miedź Legnica
October 2018	(Spain) Jesús Imaz	Wisła Kraków
November 2018	(Portugal) Flávio Paixão	Lechia Gdańsk
December 2018	(Poland) Michał Janota	Arka Gdynia
February 2019	(Serbia) Filip Mladenović	Lechia Gdańsk
March 2019	(Poland) Jakub Błaszczykowski	Wisła Kraków
April 2019	(Spain) Igor Angulo	Górnik Zabrze
May 2019	(Bosnia and Herzegovina) Zvonimir Kožulj	Pogoń Szczecin

==== Young Player of the Month ====
Month	Player	Club
September 2018	(Poland) Patryk Dziczek	Piast Gliwice
October 2018	(Poland) Sebastian Kowalczyk	Pogoń Szczecin
November 2018	(Poland) Karol Świderski	Jagiellonia Białystok
December 2018	(Poland) Radosław Majecki	Legia Warsaw
February 2019	(Poland) Filip Jagiełło	Zagłębie Lubin
March 2019	(Poland) Tomasz Makowski	Lechia Gdańsk
April 2019	(Poland) Sebastian Szymański	Legia Warsaw
May 2019	(Poland) Patryk Dziczek	Piast Gliwice

==== Coach of the Month ====
Month	Coach	Club
July 2018	(Poland) Waldemar Fornalik	Piast Gliwice
August 2018	(Poland) Piotr Stokowiec	Lechia Gdańsk
September 2018	(Poland) Waldemar Fornalik	Piast Gliwice
October 2018	(Germany) Kosta Runjaić	Pogoń Szczecin
November 2018	(Germany) Kosta Runjaić	Pogoń Szczecin
December 2018	(Poland) Michał Probierz	Cracovia
February 2019	(Poland) Michał Probierz	Cracovia
March 2019	(Poland) Waldemar Fornalik	Piast Gliwice
April 2019	(Poland) Waldemar Fornalik	Piast Gliwice
May 2019	(Poland) Waldemar Fornalik	Piast Gliwice

=== Annual awards ===
Award	Player	Club
Player of the Season	(Ecuador) Joel Valencia	Piast Gliwice
Goalkeeper of the Season	(Slovakia) František Plach	Piast Gliwice
Defender of the Season	(Serbia) Aleksandar Sedlar	Piast Gliwice
Midfielder of the Season	(Ecuador) Joel Valencia	Piast Gliwice
Forward of the Season	(Spain) Igor Angulo	Górnik Zabrze
Coach of the Season	(Poland) Waldemar Fornalik	Piast Gliwice
Top Scorer of the Season	(Spain) Igor Angulo	Górnik Zabrze
Young Player of the Season	(Poland) Patryk Dziczek	Piast Gliwice

Team of the Season
Goalkeeper	(Slovakia) František Plach (Piast Gliwice)			
Defenders	(Serbia) Aleksandar Sedlar (Piast Gliwice)	(Serbia) Filip Mladenović (Lechia Gdańsk)	(Poland) Jakub Czerwiński (Piast Gliwice)	(Poland) Robert Gumny (Lech Poznań)
Midfielders	(Ecuador) Joel Valencia (Piast Gliwice)	(Poland) Kamil Drygas (Pogoń Szczecin)		(Slovakia) Lukáš Haraslín (Lechia Gdańsk)
Forwards	(Spain) Igor Angulo (Górnik Zabrze)	(Spain) Carlos López (Legia Warsaw)		(Spain) Airam Cabrera (Cracovia)
