= 2011–12 Eredivisie =

56th season of the Eredivisie

Eredivisie
- Season: 2011–12
- Dates: 5 August 2011 – 6 May 2012
- Champions: Ajax (31st title)
- Relegated: Excelsior; De Graafschap
- Champions League: Ajax; Feyenoord
- Europa League: PSV; AZ; Heerenveen; Vitesse Arnhem; Twente
- Matches: 306
- Top goalscorer: Bas Dost (32 goals)
- Biggest home win: Heracles Almelo 7–0 VVV-Venlo; Roda JC 7–0 Excelsior
- Biggest away win: ADO Den Haag 0–6 AZ
- Highest scoring: Utrecht 6–4 Ajax
- Longest winning run: 14 games Ajax
- Longest unbeaten run: 14 games Ajax
- Longest winless run: 10 games Excelsior
- Longest losing run: 7 games VVV-Venlo
- Total attendance: 5,171,797
- Average attendance: 19,516

The 2011–12 Eredivisie is the 56th season of Eredivisie since its establishment in 1955. It began in August 2011 with the first matches of the season and ended in June with the last matches of the European competition and relegation playoffs. AFC Ajax had the highest average attendance, around 49,000.

== Teams ==
A total of 18 teams are taking part in the league, the best 15 teams from the 2010–11 season, two promotion/relegation playoff winners and the 2010–11 Eerste Divisie champions.

Location of teams in Eredivisie 2011–12
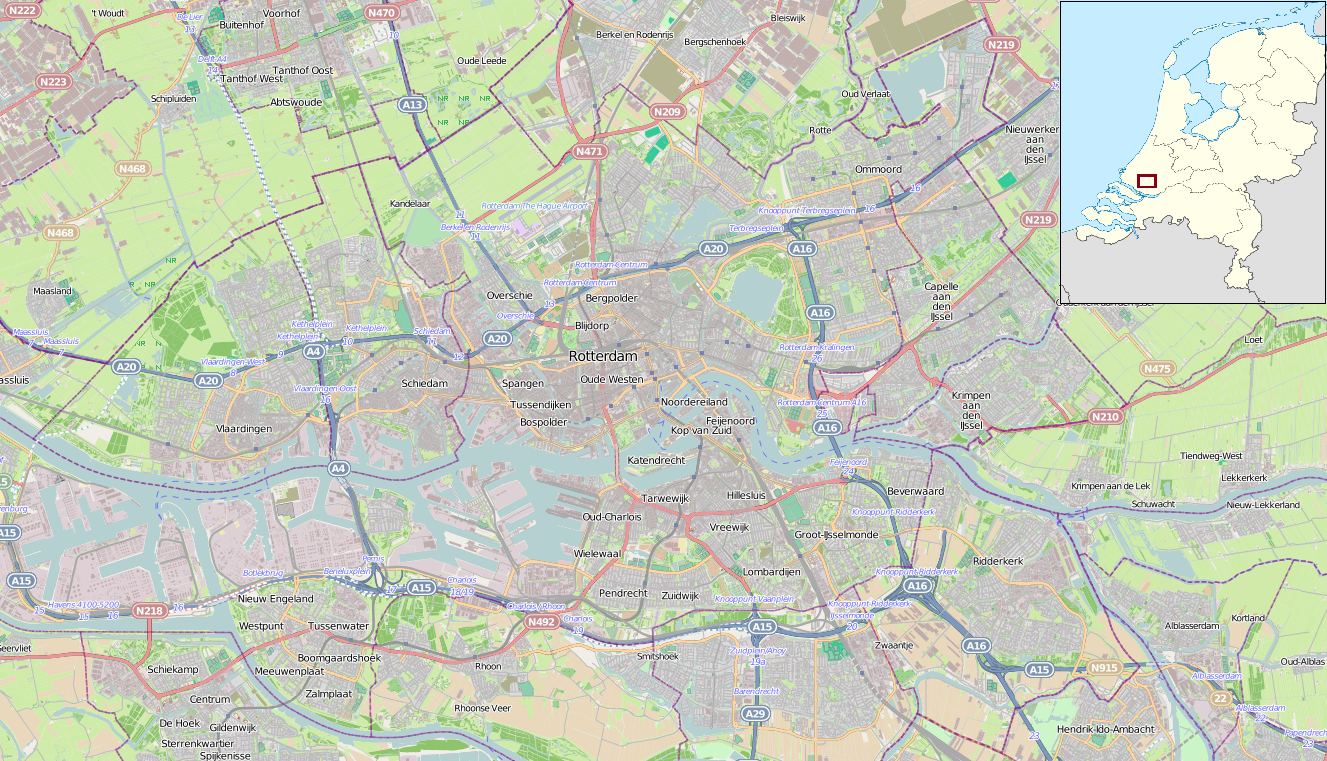
Rotterdam Eredivisie football clubs

Club	Location	Venue	Capacity
ADO Den Haag	The Hague	Kyocera Stadion	15,000
AFC Ajax	Amsterdam	Amsterdam ArenA	52,342
AZ	Alkmaar	AFAS Stadion	17,000
Excelsior	Rotterdam	Stadion Woudestein	3,531
Feyenoord	Rotterdam	De Kuip	51,577
De Graafschap	Doetinchem	De Vijverberg	12,600
FC Groningen	Groningen	Euroborg	22,580
SC Heerenveen	Heerenveen	Abe Lenstra Stadion	26,800
Heracles Almelo	Almelo	Polman Stadion	8,500
NAC Breda	Breda	Rat Verlegh Stadion	19,000
NEC	Nijmegen	Stadion de Goffert	12,470
PSV	Eindhoven	Philips Stadion	35,000
RKC Waalwijk	Waalwijk	Mandemakers Stadion	7,500
Roda JC	Kerkrade	Parkstad Limburg Stadion	19,979
FC Twente	Enschede	De Grolsch Veste	32,000
FC Utrecht	Utrecht	Stadion Galgenwaard	24,426
Vitesse Arnhem	Arnhem	GelreDome	25,000
VVV-Venlo	Venlo	De Koel	8,000

=== Managerial changes ===
Team	Outgoing manager	Manner of departure	Date of vacancy	Position in table	Replaced by	Date of appointment
N.E.C.	(Netherlands) Wiljan Vloet	Signed by Sparta Rotterdam	1 July 2011	Pre-season	(Netherlands) Alex Pastoor	1 July 2011
SBV Excelsior	(Netherlands) Alex Pastoor	Signed by NEC	1 July 2011	Pre-season	(Netherlands) John Lammers	1 July 2011
FC Utrecht	(Netherlands) Ton du Chatinier	Mutual consent	1 July 2011	Pre-season	(Netherlands) Erwin Koeman	1 July 2011
De Graafschap	(Bosnia and Herzegovina) Darije Kalezić	End of contract	1 July 2011	Pre-season	(Netherlands) Andries Ulderink	1 July 2011
VVV-Venlo	(Netherlands) Wil Boessen	End of interim spell	1 July 2011	Pre-season	(Belgium) Glen De Boeck	15 June 2011
FC Twente	(Belgium) Michel Preud'homme	Signed by Al-Shabab	1 July 2011	Pre-season	(Netherlands) Co Adriaanse	1 July 2011
SBV Vitesse	(Spain) Albert Ferrer	End of contract	1 July 2011	Pre-season	(Netherlands) John van den Brom	1 July 2011
ADO Den Haag	(Netherlands) John van den Brom	Signed by Vitesse	1 July 2011	Pre-season	(Netherlands) Maurice Steijn	1 July 2011
Feyenoord	(Netherlands) Mario Been	Resigned	13 July 2011	Pre-season	(Netherlands) Ronald Koeman	21 July 2011
FC Utrecht	(Netherlands) Erwin Koeman	Resigned	18 October 2011	10th	(Netherlands) Jan Wouters	18 October 2011
VVV-Venlo	(Belgium) Glen De Boeck	Resigned	6 December 2011	17th	(Netherlands) Wil Boessen (Netherlands) Ben van Dael (joint caretakers)	8 December 2011
VVV-Venlo	(Netherlands) Wil Boessen (Netherlands) Ben van Dael	End of caretaker spell	24 December 2011	17th	(Netherlands) Ton Lokhoff	24 December 2011
FC Twente	(Netherlands) Co Adriaanse	Dismissed	3 January 2012	3rd	(England) Steve McClaren	5 January 2012
De Graafschap	(Netherlands) Andries Ulderink	Dismissed	19 February 2012	18th	(Netherlands) Richard Roelofsen (caretaker)	20 February 2012
PSV	(Netherlands) Fred Rutten	Sacked	12 March 2012	4th	(Netherlands) Phillip Cocu (caretaker)	12 March 2012

== League table ==
Pos	Team	Pld	W	D	L	GF	GA	GD	Pts	Qualification or relegation
1	Ajax (C)	34	23	7	4	93	36	+57	76	Qualification to Champions League group stage
2	Feyenoord	34	21	7	6	70	37	+33	70	Qualification to Champions League third qualifying round
3	PSV	34	21	6	7	87	47	+40	69	Qualification to Europa League play-off round (Note: PSV qualified for the play-off round of the 2012–13 UEFA Europa League after winning the 2011–12 KNVB Cup. As they finished third in the league, all Europa League berths and play-off places were moved down one spot from the original scheme.)
4	AZ	34	19	8	7	64	35	+29	65	Qualification to Europa League play-off round
5	Heerenveen	34	18	10	6	79	59	+20	64	Qualification to Europa League third qualifying round
6	Twente	34	17	9	8	82	46	+36	60	Qualification to European competition play-offs and Europa League first qualifying round (Note: Twente qualified for the first qualifying round of the 2012–13 UEFA Europa League based on the 2011–12 UEFA Respect Fair Play ranking, which awarded one extra qualifying spot to the Netherlands. This allowed qualification for Twente despite their loss in the European competition Playoffs.)
7	Vitesse Arnhem (O)	34	15	8	11	48	43	+5	53	Qualification to European competition play-offs
8	NEC	34	13	6	15	42	45	−3	45	Qualification to European competition play-offs
9	RKC Waalwijk	34	13	6	15	40	49	−9	45	Qualification to European competition play-offs
10	Roda JC	34	14	2	18	55	70	−15	44	
11	Utrecht	34	11	10	13	55	58	−3	43	
12	Heracles	34	11	7	16	52	62	−10	40	
13	NAC Breda	34	10	8	16	45	54	−9	38	
14	Groningen	34	10	7	17	41	61	−20	37	
15	ADO Den Haag	34	8	8	18	38	67	−29	32	
16	VVV-Venlo (O)	34	9	4	21	42	78	−36	31	Qualification to relegation play-offs
17	De Graafschap (R)	34	6	6	22	36	74	−38	24	Qualification to relegation play-offs
18	Excelsior (R)	34	4	7	23	28	76	−48	19	Relegation to the Eerste Divisie

Source: Eredivisie (official site) (in Dutch)
Rules for classification: 1) points; 2) goal difference; 3) number of goals scored.
(C) Champions; (O) Play-off winners; (R) Relegated

== Results ==
Home \ Away	ADO	AJX	AZ	EXC	FEY	GRA	GRO	HEE	HER	NAC	NEC	PSV	RKC	RJC	TWE	UTR	VIT	VVV
ADO Den Haag		0–2	0–6	1–1	1–2	3–5	3–0	0–0	2–0	3–0	1–0	0–3	0–1	3–3	1–1	2–2	0–0	2–0
Ajax	4–0		2–2	4–1	1–1	3–1	2–0	5–1	6–0	2–2	4–1	2–0	3–0	4–1	1–1	0–2	4–1	2–0
AZ	3–0	1–1		2–0	2–1	4–0	1–0	3–3	3–1	0–0	4–0	3–1	1–0	1–0	2–2	2–0	4–0	2–1
Excelsior	1–1	1–4	0–0		0–2	1–1	0–1	0–5	0–2	3–0	0–2	1–3	1–0	2–1	0–1	2–3	0–2	3–1
Feyenoord	0–3	4–2	1–0	3–0		4–0	1–0	2–2	4–1	3–1	0–1	2–0	1–1	3–0	3–2	1–1	3–1	4–0
De Graafschap	0–3	1–4	0–2	2–2	0–3		2–3	0–2	2–3	3–1	1–0	1–3	1–3	1–2	1–2	3–0	0–1	1–4
Groningen	4–2	1–0	0–3	2–0	6–0	1–1		1–3	2–1	1–1	3–3	3–0	0–3	0–1	1–1	1–0	1–3	2–1
Heerenveen	4–0	0–5	5–1	4–2	2–3	1–1	3–0		1–1	1–0	2–2	1–5	1–1	4–3	1–5	2–0	1–1	4–1
Heracles	0–2	2–3	0–1	3–0	1–1	2–0	2–1	2–4		2–1	1–2	1–1	1–1	2–1	1–1	3–1	0–1	7–0
NAC Breda	4–0	0–2	2–1	2–0	1–3	1–1	2–2	2–2	1–2		1–1	3–1	3–2	0–3	0–1	1–0	1–0	3–1
N.E.C.	2–0	0–3	1–1	2–0	0–2	2–0	4–0	2–4	2–1	1–2		0–2	1–1	1–2	3–1	3–1	0–1	2–0
PSV Eindhoven	5–0	2–2	3–2	6–1	3–2	4–1	6–1	5–1	4–1	1–0	2–1		1–0	7–1	2–6	1–0	3–1	2–0
RKC Waalwijk	1–0	0–1	1–2	1–0	1–2	1–0	1–1	0–1	2–2	2–1	2–0	2–1		5–2	0–4	0–2	1–0	4–0
Roda JC	4–1	0–4	2–0	7–0	0–0	0–2	2–1	1–2	3–1	4–3	1–0	1–3	0–2		2–1	1–3	3–1	3–1
Twente	5–2	1–2	2–0	2–2	0–2	4–0	4–1	3–4	2–3	2–2	2–0	2–2	5–0	2–0		1–0	0–0	4–1
Utrecht	1–1	6–4	3–0	3–2	2–2	2–2	3–1	1–4	2–2	1–3	0–0	1–1	3–0	3–1	2–6		2–2	4–2
Vitesse Arnhem	1–0	1–3	2–2	3–2	0–4	2–0	0–0	1–1	2–0	1–0	0–1	1–1	4–0	5–0	1–4	2–1		4–0
VVV-Venlo	2–1	2–2	1–3	0–0	2–1	1–2	2–0	0–3	3–1	2–1	0–2	3–3	4–1	2–0	4–2	0–0	1–3	

Source: news.bbc.co.uk
Legend: Blue = home team win; Yellow = draw; Red = away team win.

== Play-offs ==
=== European competition ===
The teams placed sixth through ninth compete in a play-off tournament for one spot in the second qualifying round of the 2012–13 UEFA Europa League. Teams on the left played the first leg at home.

==== Semi-finals ====
The first legs were played on 10 May 2012, while the return legs were competed on 13 May 2012.

Team 1	Agg.	Team 2	1st leg	2nd leg
NEC	3–4	Vitesse Arnhem	3–2	0–2
RKC Waalwijk	2–1	Twente	1–1	1–0

==== Finals ====
The first leg was played on 17 May 2012, while the return leg was competed on 20 May 2012.

Team 1	Agg.	Team 2	1st leg	2nd leg
RKC Waalwijk	2–5	Vitesse Arnhem	1–3	1–2

=== Relegation ===
VVV-Venlo and De Graafschap joined the Eerste Divisie-teams for the playoffs, after finishing 16th and 17th in the Eredivisie. Teams on the left played the first leg at home.

==== Round 1 ====
The first legs were played on 1 May 2012, while the return legs were competed on 5 May 2012.

Team 1	Agg.	Team 2	1st leg	2nd leg
Go Ahead Eagles	1–3	Den Bosch	1–1	0–2
MVV	1–2	Cambuur	0–2	1–0

==== Round 2 ====
The first legs were played on 10 May 2012, with the return legs were competed on 13 May 2012.

Team 1	Agg.	Team 2	1st leg	2nd leg
Den Bosch	1–1	De Graafschap	0–0	1–1
Willem II	3–2	Sparta Rotterdam	2–1	1–1
Helmond Sport	3–0	Eindhoven	1–0	2–0
Cambuur	3–4	VVV-Venlo	0–0	3–4

==== Round 3 ====
Team 1	Agg.	Team 2	1st leg	2nd leg
Den Bosch	1–2	Willem II	0−0	1–2
Helmond Sport	3–4	VVV-Venlo	1−2	2–2

== Top goalscorers ==
Source: Eredivisie (official site) (in Dutch), Soccerway

Pos.	Player	Club	Goals
1	(Netherlands) Bas Dost	Heerenveen	32
2	(Netherlands) Luuk de Jong	Twente	25
2	(Syria) Sanharib Malki	Roda	25
4	(Belgium) Dries Mertens	PSV	21
5	(Sweden) John Guidetti	Feyenoord	20
6	(Sweden) Ola Toivonen	PSV	18
7	(United States) Jozy Altidore	AZ Alkmaar	15
8	(Slovenia) Tim Matavž	Groningen / PSV	14
9	(Netherlands) Siem de Jong	Ajax	13
10	(Netherlands) Glynor Plet	Heracles / Twente	12
10	(Ivory Coast) Wilfried Bony	Vitesse Arnhem	12

Updated to games played on 6 May 2012 (end of competition)

== Attendances ==
No.	Club	Average	Change	Highest
1	AFC Ajax	50,147	6,0%	52,316
2	Feyenoord	44,605	4,8%	51,777
3	PSV	33,376	-0,4%	35,000
4	FC Twente	27,707	16,4%	30,000
5	sc Heerenveen	25,306	-1,9%	26,100
6	FC Groningen	21,819	-0,4%	22,441
7	FC Utrecht	19,595	-2,4%	22,000
8	NAC Breda	17,686	-3,9%	19,000
9	SBV Vitesse	17,529	16,2%	23,549
10	AZ	16,365	0,1%	16,801
11	Roda JC	14,351	0,2%	18,400
12	NEC	12,158	-1,1%	12,500
13	ADO Den Haag	12,154	-7,7%	14,273
14	De Graafschap	12,038	0,6%	12,600
15	Heracles Almelo	8,453	-0,1%	8,500
16	VVV-Venlo	7,515	-0,7%	8,000
17	RKC Waalwijk	6,279	49,6%	7,850
18	SBV Excelsior	3,303	-0,5%	3,531
