= Daniel Bielica =

Polish footballer (born 1999)

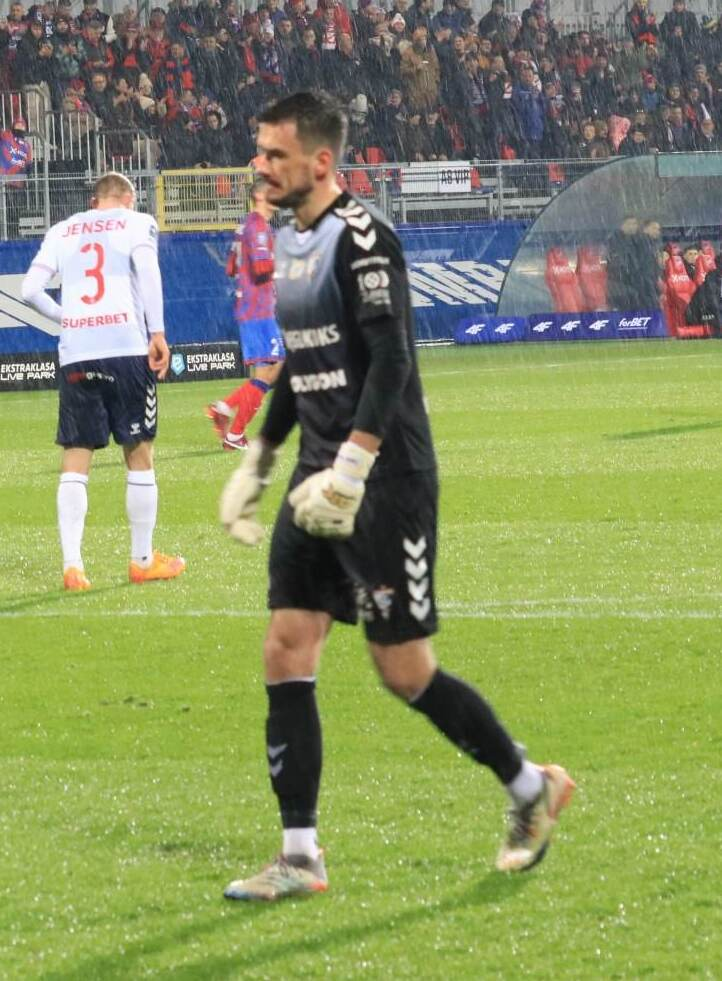
- Bielica in 2023 with Górnik Zabrze

Personal information
- Full name: Daniel Henryk Bielica
- Date of birth: 30 April 1999 (age 27)
- Place of birth: Zabrze, Poland
- Height: 1.91 m (6 ft 3 in)
- Position: Goalkeeper

Team information
- Current team: Portsmouth
- Number: 31

Youth career
- –2015: Zaborze Zabrze
- 2015–2017: Górnik Zabrze

Senior career*
Years	Team	Apps	(Gls)
2017–2022	Górnik Zabrze II	33	(0)
2017–2024	Górnik Zabrze	73	(0)
2019–2020	→ Sandecja Nowy Sącz (loan)	33	(0)
2020–2021	→ Warta Poznań (loan)	5	(0)
2024–2026	NAC Breda	65	(0)
2026–	Portsmouth	3	(0)
- * Club domestic league appearances and goals as of 19:25, 16 September 2026 (UTC)

Daniel Henryk Bielica (born 30 April 1999) is a Polish professional footballer who plays as a goalkeeper for EFL Championship club Portsmouth.

== Club career ==
On 12 August 2020, Bielica was loaned to Warta Poznań.

In June 2024, Bielica joined newly promoted Eredivisie side NAC Breda on a two-year deal with the option for a third.

On 24 July 2026, Bielica moved to EFL Championship club Portsmouth on a three-year contract for an undisclosed fee.

== Career statistics ==
As of match played 17 May 2026

Appearances and goals by club, season and competition
Club	Season	League			National cup (Note: Includes Polish Cup, KNVB Cup)		Continental		Other		Total	
Club	Season	Division	Apps	Goals	Apps	Goals	Apps	Goals	Apps	Goals	Apps	Goals
Górnik Zabrze	2018–19	Ekstraklasa	1	0	2	0	0	0	—		3	0
Górnik Zabrze	2021–22	Ekstraklasa	14	0	2	0	—		—		16	0
Górnik Zabrze	2022–23	Ekstraklasa	24	0	3	0	—		—		27	0
Górnik Zabrze	2023–24	Ekstraklasa	34	0	0	0	—		—		34	0
Górnik Zabrze	Total		73	0	7	0	—		—		80	0
Sandecja Nowy Sącz (loan)	2019–20	I liga	33	0	1	0	—		—		34	0
Warta Poznań (loan)	2020–21	Ekstraklasa	5	0	2	0	—		—		7	0
NAC Breda	2024–25	Eredivisie	32	0	1	0	—		—		33	0
NAC Breda	2025–26	Eredivisie	33	0	0	0	—		—		33	0
NAC Breda	Total		65	0	1	0	—		—		65	0
Career total			176	0	11	0	0	0	0	0	187	0
