= Fabian Piasecki =

Polish footballer

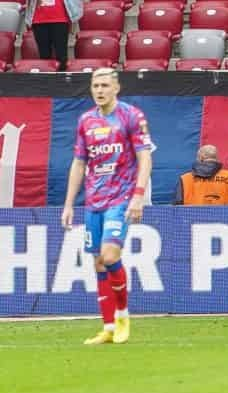
- Piasecki playing for Raków Częstochowa in 2023

Personal information
- Date of birth: 4 May 1995 (age 31)
- Place of birth: Wrocław, Poland
- Height: 1.86 m (6 ft 1 in)
- Position: Forward

Team information
- Current team: ŁKS Łódź
- Number: 99

Youth career
- Sokół Świba
- LZS Olszowa
- –2009: Marcinki Kępno
- 2009–2010: Polonia Kępno
- 2010–2013: Górnik Zabrze

Senior career*
Years	Team	Apps	(Gls)
2013–2014	Rozwój Katowice	9	(0)
2014–2016	Górnik Zabrze II	39	(11)
2015	Górnik Zabrze	5	(0)
2016–2017	Olimpia Zambrów	28	(13)
2017–2019	Miedź Legnica	51	(10)
2019–2020	Zagłębie Sosnowiec	32	(17)
2020–2022	Śląsk Wrocław	45	(7)
2021–2022	→ Stal Mielec (loan)	13	(4)
2022–2024	Raków Częstochowa	37	(6)
2024–2025	Piast Gliwice	28	(3)
2025–	ŁKS Łódź	34	(14)
2026–	ŁKS Łódź II	1	(1)

International career
2013	Poland U18	1	(1)
- * Club domestic league appearances and goals as of 15:46, 29 May 2026 (UTC)

Fabian Piasecki (born 4 May 1995) is a Polish professional footballer who plays as a forward for I liga club ŁKS Łódź.

== Career ==
=== Youth career ===
He started his youth career with Sokół Świba, before moving to LZS Olszowa and Marcinki Kępno. In 2009, he started playing for Polonia Kępno, then moved to Górnik Zabrze the following year, where he remained until 2013.

=== Rozwój Katowice ===
In 2013, he was transferred to Rozwój Katowice, where he played in nine matches. His first appearance as a Rozwój player came on 24 August 2013 in a win over Odra Opole. In Rozwój Katowice, he wore the squad number 16. He did not score any goals in the 2013–14 season.

=== Górnik Zabrze ===
In 2014, he was transferred to Górnik Zabrze II. His first match in Górnik was on 13 September 2014, replacing Bartosz Pikul the bench in the 55th minute of a 2–2 draw to Małapanew Ozimek. He scored his first goal there in a 4–1 victory over Grunwald Ruda Śląska on 25 April 2015. In the 2014–15 season, he also occasionally appeared in Górnik Zabrze, not scoring any goal.

=== Olimpia Zambrów ===
In 2016, he was transferred to Olimpia Zambrów. He first played a match in Olimpia on 27 August 2016 in a drawn match with Radomiak Radom, when he came off a bench in 70th minute, replacing Jakub Cesarek. He scored his first Olimpia goal on 10 September 2016 in a win over his former team, Rozwój Katowice. In 2016–17 season, he scored 13 goals in total, four of which came from a penalty kicks.

=== Miedź Legnica ===
In 2018, he advanced with Miedź Legnica from I liga to Ekstraklasa.

=== Śląsk Wrocław ===
On 23 May 2022, he was awarded at Ekstraklasa Gala in the "Goal of the Season" category for a bicycle kick goal he scored in injury-time of a 1–1 draw against Piast Gliwice on 22 August 2021.

=== Raków Częstochowa ===
In June 2022, Piasecki was transferred to Raków Częstochowa for €200.000, with his contract lasting 4 years. His first appearance on Raków was on 15 July 2022 in a win against Warta Poznań, when he got off the bench in the 85th minute, replacing Vladislavs Gutkovskis. With Raków, he won the 2022–23 Ekstraklasa title.

On 29 May 2023, he won his second "Goal of the Season" award, for yet another overhead kick goal, scored against Radomiak Radom scored on 17 September 2023.

=== Piast Gliwice ===
On 2 February 2024, he was transferred to Piast Gliwice on a two-year deal.

=== ŁKS Łódź ===
On 27 June 2025, Piasecki joined I liga club ŁKS Łódź on a two-year contract.

== Honours ==
Górnik Zabrze II

- Polish Cup (Zabrze regionals): 2015–16

Miedź Legnica

- I liga: 2017–18

Raków Częstochowa

- Ekstraklasa: 2022–23

Individual

- I liga top scorer: 2019–20
- Ekstraklasa Goal of the Season: 2021–22, 2022–23
