= 2023–24 Ekstraklasa =

98th season of top-tier football league in Poland

Ekstraklasa
- Season: 2023–24
- Dates: 21 July 2023 – 25 May 2024
- Champions: Jagiellonia Białystok (1st title)
- Relegated: ŁKS Łódź; Ruch Chorzów; Warta Poznań
- Champions League: Jagiellonia Białystok
- Conference League: Śląsk Wrocław; Legia Warsaw
- Matches: 306
- Goals: 823 (2.69 per match)
- Top goalscorer: Erik Expósito (19 goals)
- Biggest home win: Cracovia 6–0 Radomiak (10 February 2024); Jagiellonia 6–0 ŁKS Łódź (30 March 2024)
- Biggest away win: ŁKS Łódź 0–5 Górnik (27 October 2023)
- Highest scoring: Ruch 3–5 Raków (24 September 2023); Korona 5–3 Puszcza (27 October 2023); Cracovia 4–4 Ruch (3 December 2023)
- Longest winning run: 7 matches Śląsk Wrocław
- Longest unbeaten run: 16 matches Śląsk Wrocław
- Longest winless run: 20 matches Ruch Chorzów
- Longest losing run: 5 matches ŁKS Łódź (twice)
- Highest attendance: 49,514 (Note: Match played at the Stadion Śląski in Chorzów.); Ruch 2–3 Widzew (20 April 2024)
- Lowest attendance: 1,058 (Note: Match played at the Stadion Dyskobolii in Grodzisk Wielkopolski.); Warta 1–2 Jagiellonia (1 December 2023)
- Total attendance: 3,769,001
- Average attendance: 12,317 ▲31.0%

The 2023–24 Ekstraklasa (also known as PKO Bank Polski Ekstraklasa due to its sponsorship by PKO Bank Polski) was the 98th season of the Polish Football Championship, the 90th season of the highest tier domestic division in the Polish football league system since its establishment in 1927 and the 16th season of the Ekstraklasa under its current title. The league is operated by the Ekstraklasa S.A.

The regular season was played as a round-robin tournament. A total of 18 teams participated, 15 of which competed in the league campaign during the 2022–23 season, while the remaining three is promoted from the 2022–23 I liga. The season started on 21 July 2023 and concluded on 25 May 2024. Each team played a total of 34 matches, half at home and half away. It was the third season in the formula with 18 teams, instead of 16. It was expected that the bottom three teams of the final league table will be relegated. It was the seventh Ekstraklasa season to use VAR.

Raków Częstochowa were the defending champions, who won their 1st Polish title the previous season. Jagiellonia Białystok clinched their first Ekstraklasa title on 25 May after defeating Warta Poznań 3–0 at home in the last round. The season's runner-ups were Śląsk Wrocław, and the third-placed team was Legia Warsaw.

== Teams ==
A total of 18 teams participated in the 2023–24 Ekstraklasa season.

=== Changes from last season ===
Miedź Legnica was the first team that had been relegated to 2023–24 I liga after a 1–1 draw with Cracovia on 1 May 2023, ending its one-year stay in Ekstraklasa. The second team relegated was Lechia Gdańsk, who sealed their fate after a 1–3 loss to Zagłębie Lubin on 6 May 2023 and ended their fifteen-year stay in the top flight. Wisła Płock was the last relegated team after losing the final game of the season against Cracovia 0–3, ending their seven-year stay in the top flight. The first promoted team was ŁKS Łódź whose 1–1 draw away at Arka Gdynia on 26 May 2023 confirmed their return to Ekstraklasa after three years. The second team that got promoted is Ruch Chorzów, who won against GKS Tychy 1–0 on 3 June 2023 and returned to the top flight after six years. The third and final team to qualify for Ekstraklasa was Puszcza Niepołomice. After defeating Bruk-Bet Termalica Nieciecza 2–3 (after extra time) in play-offs final on 11 June 2023, Puszcza entered the top flight for the first time in the club's history.

Promoted from 2022–23 I liga	Relegated from 2022–23 Ekstraklasa
▲ ŁKS Łódź (1st) ▲ Ruch Chorzów (2nd) ▲ Puszcza Niepołomice (PO)	▼ Wisła Płock (16th) ▼ Lechia Gdańsk (17th) ▼ Miedź Legnica (18th)

=== Stadiums and locations ===
Note: Table lists in alphabetical order.

Location of teams in 2023–24 Ekstraklasa.
Location of teams in the Katowice urban area in 2023–24 Ekstraklasa.

Team	Location	Venue	Capacity
Cracovia	Kraków	Stadion Cracovii im. Józefa Piłsudskiego	15,016
Górnik Zabrze	Zabrze	Stadion im. Ernesta Pohla	24,563^{1}
Jagiellonia Białystok	Białystok	Stadion Miejski	22,372
Korona Kielce	Kielce	Suzuki Arena	15,550
Lech Poznań	Poznań	Enea Stadion	42,837
Legia Warsaw	Warsaw	Stadion Wojska Polskiego	31,103
ŁKS Łódź	Łódź	Stadion Miejski im. Władysława Króla	18,029
Piast Gliwice	Gliwice	Stadion Miejski im. Piotra Wieczorka	9,913
Pogoń Szczecin	Szczecin	Stadion Miejski im. Floriana Krygiera	21,163
Puszcza Niepołomice	Niepołomice	Stadion Cracovii im. Józefa Piłsudskiego^{2}	15,016
Radomiak Radom	Radom	Stadion im. Braci Czachorów	8,840
Raków Częstochowa	Częstochowa	Miejski Stadion Piłkarski "Raków"	5,500
Ruch Chorzów	Chorzów	Stadion Miejski im. Piotra Wieczorka; Stadion Śląski^{3}	9,913; 54,378
Stal Mielec	Mielec	Stadion Miejski	6,864
Śląsk Wrocław	Wrocław	Tarczyński Arena	42,771
Warta Poznań	Poznań	Stadion Respect Energy^{4}	5,383
Widzew Łódź	Łódź	Stadion Widzewa	18,018
Zagłębie Lubin	Lubin	KGHM Zagłebie Arena	16,086

1. Upgrading to 31,871.
2. Due to the fact that Stadion Puszczy doesn't meet the Ekstraklasa standards, Puszcza Niepołomice will be playing its home matches in Stadion im. Henryka Reymana in Kraków. However after protests of Wisła Kraków's supporters, Puszcza was forced to find a home ground somewhere else. Ultimately on 20 June 2023 it was decided that they will play its first matches in Stadion im. Marszałka Józefa Piłsudskiego (Cracovia's home ground), with the possibility to return to Niepołomice after its stadium's Ekstraklasa accommodation.
3. Due to the fact that Stadion Ruchu Chorzów doesn't meet the Ekstraklasa standards, Ruch Chorzów will play their first matches in Stadion Miejski im. Piotra Wieczorka in Gliwice. They also registered Stadion Śląski as their home venue and since 28 October 2023 (round 13), Ruch moved there for the match against Śląsk Wrocław.
4. Due to the renovation of Dębińska Road Stadium in Poznań, Warta will play home matches at the Stadion Dyskobolii Grodzisk Wielkopolski in Grodzisk Wielkopolski.

Cracovia and Puszcza	Górnik	Jagiellonia	Korona	Lech	Legia
Stadion Cracovii im. Józefa Piłsudskiego	Stadion im. Ernesta Pohla	Stadion Miejski	Suzuki Arena	Enea Stadion	Stadion Wojska Polskiego
Capacity: 15,114	Capacity: 24,563	Capacity: 22,432	Capacity: 15,550	Capacity: 43,269	Capacity: 31,800
ŁKS Łódź	Piast and Ruch (until round 12)	Pogoń	Radomiak	Raków	Ruch (since round 13)
Stadion Miejski im. Władysława Króla	Stadion Miejski im. Piotra Wieczorka	Stadion Miejski im. Floriana Krygiera	Stadion im. Braci Czachorów	Miejski Stadion Piłkarski "Raków"	Stadion Śląski
Capacity: 18,029	Capacity: 10,037	Capacity: 21,163	Capacity: 8,840	Capacity: 5,500	Capacity: 55,211
Stal	Śląsk	Warta	Widzew	Zagłębie	
Stadion Miejski	Tarczyński Arena Wrocław	Stadion Respect Energy	Stadion Widzewa	KGHM Zagłebie Arena	
Capacity: 6,864	Capacity: 45,105	Capacity: 5,383	Capacity: 18,018	Capacity: 16,068	

=== Personnel and kits ===
All teams have Lotto (brand of Totalizator Sportowy) placed on the center of the chest.

Team	Chairman	Head coach	Appointment date	Captain	Manufacturer	Strategic sponsor	Other kit sponsors
Cracovia	(Poland) Mateusz Dróżdż	(Poland) Dawid Kroczek	5 April 2024	(Czech Republic) Jakub Jugas	Puma	Comarch	Comarch^{1}
Górnik Zabrze	Vacant	(Poland) Jan Urban	18 March 2023	(Slovenia) Erik Janža	Capelli Sport	Węglokoks	Superbet^{1}, Zabrze^{2}
Jagiellonia Białystok	(Poland) Wojciech Pertkiewicz	(Poland) Adrian Siemieniec	4 April 2023	(Poland) Taras Romanczuk	Kappa	Enea, Kuchnia Wikinga	Białystok^{1}, STS^{2}, Chorten^{2}
Korona Kielce	(Poland) Łukasz Jabłoński	(Poland) Kamil Kuzera	29 October 2022	(Poland) Miłosz Trojak	4F	Suzuki	Lewiatan^{1} ^{3}, Kielce^{2}, Targi Kielce^{2}
Lech Poznań	(Poland) Karol Klimczak	(Poland) Mariusz Rumak	18 December 2023	(Sweden) Mikael Ishak	Macron	Superbet	Lech Pils^{1}, Poznań^{2}, Artbud^{3}
Legia Warsaw	(Poland) Dariusz Mioduski	(Portugal) Gonçalo Feio	10 April 2024	(Portugal) Josué	Adidas	Plus500	Fortuna^{1}, Królewskie^{2}, Warsaw^{3}
ŁKS Łódź	(Poland) Jarosław Olszowy	(Poland) Marcin Matysiak	20 February 2024	(Poland) Bartosz Szeliga	Adidas	forBET	Stowarzyszenie Kibiców ŁKS^{2}, R-GOL.com^{2}, 600 lat Łodzi^{2}, Cosinus^{3}
Piast Gliwice	(Poland) Grzegorz Jaworski	(Serbia) Aleksandar Vuković	27 October 2022	(Poland) Jakub Czerwiński	4F	Kuchnia Wikinga, verocargo	Gliwice^{1}, LV BET^{2}
Pogoń Szczecin	(Poland) Jarosław Mroczek	(Sweden) Jens Gustafsson	15 June 2022	(Poland) Kamil Grosicki	Capelli Sport	Toyota, Betcris	Fabryka Papieru "KACZORY"^{1}, Szczecin^{2}, dostalk^{3}
Puszcza Niepołomice	(Poland) Marek Bartoszek	(Poland) Tomasz Tułacz	13 August 2015	(Poland) Jakub Serafin	Nike	Niepołomice	PKO Bank Polski^{2}, R-GOL.com^{2}
Radomiak Radom	(Poland) Sławomir Stempniewski	(Portugal) Bruno Baltazar	20 May 2024	(Brazil) Raphael Rossi	Adidas	Enea	Radom^{1}, 11teamsports^{2}, Fortuna^{2}
Raków Częstochowa	(Poland) Piotr Obidziński	(Poland) Dawid Szwarga	28 May 2023	(Croatia) Zoran Arsenić	Adidas	x-kom, zondacrypto	Tauron Group^{1}, Częstochowa^{2}, ZPUE^{2}, 4Move^{3}
Ruch Chorzów	(Poland) Seweryn Siemianowski	(Poland) Janusz Niedźwiedź	29 December 2023	(Poland) Tomasz Foszmańczyk	Nike	Betclic, Nefrolux	Urovita^{1}, Chorzów^{2}, NO10^{2}, Alba^{2} ^{3}, CADesigner^{3}
Stal Mielec	(Poland) Jacek Klimek	(Poland) Kamil Kiereś	20 March 2023	(Poland) Krystian Getinger	4F	PGE, PZU	PGE^{1}, Mielec^{2}, Podkarpackie^{2}, Metkom^{3}
Śląsk Wrocław	(Poland) Patryk Załęczny	(Poland) Jacek Magiera	21 April 2023	(Spain) Erik Expósito	Nike	LV BET	Wrocław^{1}, Wrocław Airport^{2}, #PijKranówkę^{2}, Jaxan^{2}, Acana^{3}
Warta Poznań	(Poland) Artur Meissner	(Poland) Dawid Szulczek	8 November 2021	(Poland) Mateusz Kupczak	Nike	Fogo	Sushi4You^{1}, Wuprinż^{2}, R-GOL.com^{2}, Renault^{3}, OnlyBio^{3}
Widzew Łódź	(Poland) Michał Rydz	(Poland) Daniel Myśliwiec	5 September 2023	(Poland) Bartłomiej Pawłowski	Macron	Panattoni, TERMOton	Murapol^{1}, PKP Cargo^{2}, STS^{2}, Łódź Voivodeship^{3}, CoBouw^{3}
Zagłębie Lubin	(Poland) Paweł Jeż	(Poland) Waldemar Fornalik	29 November 2022	(Poland) Bartosz Kopacz	Nike	KGHM	STS^{2}

1. On the back of shirt.
2. On the sleeves.
3. On the shorts.

=== Managerial changes ===
Team	Outgoing manager	Manner of departure	Date of vacancy	Position in table	Incoming manager	Date of appointment
Raków Częstochowa	(Poland) Marek Papszun	End of contract	27 May 2023	Pre-season	(Poland) Dawid Szwarga	28 May 2023
Widzew Łódź	(Poland) Janusz Niedźwiedź	Sacked	5 September 2023	12th	(Poland) Daniel Myśliwiec	5 September 2023
ŁKS Łódź	(Poland) Kazimierz Moskal	Sacked	11 October 2023	18th	(Poland) Piotr Stokowiec	12 October 2023
Ruch Chorzów	(Poland) Jarosław Skrobacz	Mutual consent	6 November 2023	17th	(Poland) Jan Woś	6 November 2023
Radomiak Radom	(Romania) Constantin Gâlcă	Mutual consent	27 November 2023	10th	(Poland) Maciej Lesisz	27 November 2023
Radomiak Radom	(Poland) Maciej Lesisz	End of caretaker spell	1 December 2023	10th	(Poland) Maciej Kędziorek	1 December 2023
Lech Poznań	(Netherlands) John van den Brom	Sacked	17 December 2023	3rd	(Poland) Mariusz Rumak	18 December 2023
Ruch Chorzów	(Poland) Jan Woś	Mutual consent	29 December 2023	17th	(Poland) Janusz Niedźwiedź	29 December 2023
ŁKS Łódź	(Poland) Piotr Stokowiec	Sacked	20 February 2024	18th	(Poland) Marcin Matysiak	20 February 2024
Cracovia	(Poland) Jacek Zieliński	Sacked	5 April 2024	12th	(Poland) Dawid Kroczek (Note: Kroczek was initially appointed on an interim basis, but the move was made permanent on 23 May 2024.)	5 April 2024
Legia Warsaw	(Germany) Kosta Runjaić	Sacked	9 April 2024	5th	(Portugal) Gonçalo Feio	10 April 2024
Radomiak Radom	(Poland) Maciej Kędziorek	Sacked	19 May 2024	12th	(Portugal) Bruno Baltazar	20 May 2024

- Italics for interim managers.

== League table ==
Pos	Team	Pld	W	D	L	GF	GA	GD	Pts	Qualification or relegation
1	Jagiellonia Białystok	34	18	9	7	77	45	+32	63 (Note: Jagiellonia Białystok finished ahead of Śląsk Wrocław on head-to-head goal difference: Śląsk Wrocław 2–1 Jagiellonia Białystok, Jagiellonia Białystok 3–1 Śląsk Wrocław)	Qualification for the Champions League second qualifying round
2	Śląsk Wrocław	34	18	9	7	50	31	+19	63	Qualification for the Conference League second qualifying round
3	Legia Warsaw	34	16	11	7	51	39	+12	59	Qualification for the Conference League second qualifying round
4	Pogoń Szczecin	34	16	7	11	59	38	+21	55	
5	Lech Poznań	34	14	11	9	47	41	+6	53	
6	Górnik Zabrze	34	15	8	11	45	41	+4	53	
7	Raków Częstochowa	34	14	10	10	54	39	+15	52	
8	Zagłębie Lubin	34	13	8	13	43	50	−7	47	
9	Widzew Łódź	34	13	7	14	45	46	−1	46	
10	Piast Gliwice	34	9	16	9	38	35	+3	43 (Note: Piast Gliwice finished ahead of Stal Mielec on head-to-head points: Stal Mielec 0–0 Piast Gliwice, Piast Gliwice 3–0 Stal Mielec)	
11	Stal Mielec	34	11	10	13	42	48	−6	43	
12	Puszcza Niepołomice	34	9	13	12	39	49	−10	40	
13	Cracovia	34	8	15	11	45	46	−1	39	
14	Korona Kielce	34	8	14	12	40	44	−4	38 (Note: Korona Kielce finished ahead of Radomiak Radom on head-to-head points: Radomiak Radom 1–1 Korona Kielce, Korona Kielce 4–0 Radomiak Radom)	
15	Radomiak Radom	34	10	8	16	41	58	−17	38	
16	Warta Poznań	34	9	10	15	33	43	−10	37	Relegation to I liga
17	Ruch Chorzów	34	6	14	14	40	55	−15	32	Relegation to I liga
18	ŁKS Łódź	34	6	6	22	34	75	−41	24	Relegation to I liga

Source: ekstraklasa.org 90minut.pl
Rules for classification: 1) Points; 2) Head-to-head points; 3) Head-to-head goal difference; 4) Goal difference; 5) Goals scored; 6) Number of wins; 7) Number of away wins; 8) Lower number of points based on yellow and red cards (red card = 3 points, yellow card = 1 point, sending-off = 3 points - including 1 point for first yellow card); 9) Fairplay ranking; 10) Draw.
(Note: Head-to-head record is used only after all the matches between the teams in question have been played)

== Results ==
Home \ Away	CRA	GÓR	JAG	KOR	LPO	LEG	ŁKS	PIA	POG	PUN	RAD	RCZ	RCH	STM	ŚLĄ	WAR	WID	ZAG
Cracovia	—	5–0	2–4	0–0	1–1	2–0	2–2	1–1	1–5	0–1	6–0	2–0	4–4	2–2	0–1	0–1	2–2	2–1
Górnik Zabrze	1–0	—	2–1	3–1	0–0	1–3	4–1	0–0	1–0	1–1	0–2	2–1	1–0	1–1	2–0	3–0	1–1	0–2
Jagiellonia Białystok	1–3	4–1	—	3–0	1–2	2–0	6–0	0–0	2–2	4–1	3–2	4–2	1–1	4–0	3–1	3–0	2–1	3–0
Korona Kielce	1–1	0–1	2–2	—	0–1	3–3	2–1	1–1	2–2	5–3	4–0	0–2	2–0	1–0	1–1	1–1	1–1	2–0
Lech Poznań	0–0	1–1	3–3	1–2	—	1–2	3–1	0–1	1–0	4–1	2–0	4–1	2–0	2–1	0–0	2–0	1–3	2–0
Legia Warsaw	2–0	2–1	1–1	1–0	0–0	—	3–0	3–1	1–1	1–1	0–3	1–2	3–0	1–3	0–0	2–2	3–1	2–1
ŁKS Łódź	0–2	0–5	2–2	2–1	2–3	1–1	—	3–3	1–0	3–2	3–2	1–1	1–1	3–2	1–2	0–2	0–2	0–2
Piast Gliwice	0–0	1–3	1–1	0–0	1–2	1–1	4–0	—	0–0	1–0	2–3	2–1	0–0	3–0	2–2	2–0	3–2	2–0
Pogoń Szczecin	3–1	1–0	2–1	3–1	5–0	3–4	4–2	0–2	—	1–0	0–2	1–1	5–0	2–3	0–2	3–3	2–1	0–2
Puszcza Niepołomice	1–1	2–1	3–3	1–1	2–1	1–1	2–1	1–0	0–2	—	1–1	1–1	2–2	1–0	1–3	1–0	1–0	2–2
Radomiak Radom	0–1	1–1	0–2	1–1	2–2	0–1	3–0	1–1	0–4	1–1	—	2–1	0–2	2–1	0–1	3–2	1–3	3–4
Raków Częstochowa	1–1	0–1	3–0	1–0	4–0	1–1	1–0	3–1	2–1	2–0	3–0	—	1–1	2–0	1–2	2–2	1–1	5–0
Ruch Chorzów	2–0	1–2	0–1	1–1	2–1	0–1	2–0	3–0	0–3	0–0	0–0	3–5	—	1–1	2–2	0–0	2–3	2–2
Stal Mielec	2–2	2–1	3–2	2–3	0–0	1–3	1–0	0–0	0–0	2–1	2–0	0–0	3–1	—	3–1	0–1	0–0	4–2
Śląsk Wrocław	4–0	1–1	2–1	0–0	3–1	4–0	2–1	1–0	0–1	0–0	2–0	1–1	2–3	0–1	—	2–1	2–1	1–2
Warta Poznań	0–0	2–0	1–2	1–0	0–2	0–1	0–1	1–1	0–1	0–2	0–0	2–1	2–2	5–2	0–1	—	2–1	1–1
Widzew Łódź	2–0	3–1	1–3	3–1	1–1	1–0	1–0	1–0	1–2	3–2	0–3	0–1	2–1	1–0	0–2	0–1	—	1–3
Zagłębie Lubin	1–1	1–2	1–2	1–0	1–1	0–3	2–1	1–1	1–0	1–0	2–3	2–0	2–1	0–0	1–2	1–0	1–1	—

Source: ekstraklasa.org
Legend: Blue = home team win; Yellow = draw; Red = away team win.
For upcoming matches, an "a" indicates there is an article about the rivalry between the two participants.

== Season statistics ==
=== Top goalscorers ===
Rank	Player	Club	Goals
1	(Spain) Erik Expósito	Śląsk Wrocław	19
2	(Belarus) Ilya Shkurin	Stal Mielec	16
3	(Poland) Kamil Grosicki	Pogoń Szczecin	13
4	(Greece) Efthymis Koulouris	Pogoń Szczecin	12
4	(Spain) Jesús Imaz	Jagiellonia Białystok	12
4	(Poland) Dawid Kurminowski	Zagłębie Lubin	12
4	(Angola) Afimico Pululu	Jagiellonia Białystok	12
8	(Sweden) Mikael Ishak	Lech Poznań	11
9	(Poland) Daniel Szczepan	Ruch Chorzów	10
9	(Norway) Kristoffer Velde	Lech Poznań	10
9	(Belarus) Yevgeniy Shikavka	Korona Kielce	10

=== Clean sheets ===
Rank	Player	Club	Clean sheets
1	(Poland) Rafał Leszczyński	Śląsk Wrocław	13
2	(Poland) Bartosz Mrozek	Lech Poznań	11
3	(Poland) Daniel Bielica	Górnik Zabrze	10
3	(Romania) Valentin Cojocaru	Pogoń Szczecin	10
3	(Bosnia and Herzegovina) Vladan Kovačević	Raków Częstochowa	10
6	(Serbia) Zlatan Alomerović	Jagiellonia Białystok	9
6	(Poland) Mateusz Kochalski	Stal Mielec	9
6	(Slovakia) František Plach	Piast Gliwice	9
6	(Poland) Kacper Tobiasz	Legia Warsaw	9
10	(Poland) Jędrzej Grobelny	Warta Poznań	8

=== Hat-tricks ===
Player	For	Against	Result	Date	Ref
(Czech Republic) Tomáš Pekhart	Legia Warsaw	ŁKS Łódź	3–0 (H)	21 July 2023	
(Poland) Dawid Drachal	Raków Częstochowa	Ruch Chorzów	3–5 (A)	24 September 2023	
(Belarus) Ilya Shkurin	Stal Mielec	Pogoń Szczecin	2–3 (A)	25 November 2023	
(Greece) Efthymis Koulouris	Pogoń Szczecin	Ruch Chorzów	5–0 (H)	12 April 2024	
(Slovakia) Adam Zreľák	Warta Poznań	Stal Mielec	5–2 (H)	22 April 2024	
(Poland) Dawid Kurminowski	Zagłębie Lubin	Radomiak Radom	3–4 (A)	28 April 2024	

== Attendances ==
Pos	Team	Total	High	Low	Average	Change
1	Lech Poznań	422,485	40,362	14,104	24,900	+20.1%
2	Legia Warsaw	420,175	29,028	20,116	24,700	+16.3%
3	Śląsk Wrocław	382,181	40,000	12,375	22,500	+117.1%
4	Ruch Chorzów	314,169	49,514	8,840	18,500	+114.9%^{1}
5	Pogoń Szczecin	294,003	20,157	8,801	17,300	+12.4%
6	Widzew Łódź	292,165	17,823	15,467	17,200	+0.6%
7	Górnik Zabrze	278,906	22,889	9,409	16,400	+12.2%
8	Jagiellonia Białystok	233,295	22,021	8,049	13,700	+51.2%
9	Korona Kielce	182,239	14,141	7,747	10,700	+6.3%
10	ŁKS Łódź	165,044	15,132	6,473	9,700	+7.1%^{1}
11	Cracovia	153,802	12,347	5,126	9,000	+6.7%
12	Radomiak Radom	131,563	8,569	5,647	7,700	+126.0%
13	Zagłębie Lubin	109,038	15,813	4,205	6,400	+10.1%
16	Stal Mielec	98,089	6,392	5,207	5,800	+14.8%
15	Raków Częstochowa	90,402	5,500	4,816	5,300	+1.0%
16	Piast Gliwice	89,523	8,035	3,171	5,000	+19.9%
17	Warta Poznań	64,448	28,419	1,058	3,800	+36.6%
18	Puszcza Niepołomice	47,474	5,313	1,304	2,800	+132.0%^{1}
	League total	3,769,001	49,514	1,058	12,317	+31.0%

Source: 90minut (in Polish)
Notes:
1. Team played last season in I liga.

== Awards ==
=== Monthly awards ===
==== Player of the Month ====
Month	Player	Club
July 2023	(Poland) Filip Marchwiński	Lech Poznań
August 2023	(Spain) Erik Expósito	Śląsk Wrocław
September 2023	(Spain) Erik Expósito	Śląsk Wrocław
October 2023	(Spain) Erik Expósito	Śląsk Wrocław
November 2023	(Belarus) Ilya Shkurin	Stal Mielec
December 2023	(Portugal) Nené	Jagiellonia Białystok
February 2024	(Poland) Kamil Grosicki	Pogoń Szczecin
March 2024	(Poland) Dominik Marczuk	Jagiellonia Białystok
April 2024	(Germany) Lawrence Ennali	Górnik Zabrze
May 2024	(Angola) Afimico Pululu	Jagiellonia Białystok

==== Young Player of the Month ====
Month	Player	Club
July 2023	(Poland) Filip Marchwiński	Lech Poznań
August 2023	(Poland) Kajetan Szmyt	Warta Poznań
September 2023	(Poland) Dawid Drachal	Raków Częstochowa
October 2023	(Poland) Dominik Marczuk	Jagiellonia Białystok
November 2023	(Poland) Łukasz Bejger	Śląsk Wrocław
December 2023	(Poland) Ariel Mosór	Piast Gliwice
February 2024	(Poland) Filip Szymczak	Lech Poznań
March 2024	(Poland) Dominik Marczuk	Jagiellonia Białystok
April 2024	(Poland) Kamil Lukoszek	Górnik Zabrze
May 2024	(Poland) Oliwier Zych	Puszcza Niepołomice

==== Coach of the Month ====
Month	Coach	Club
July 2023	(Poland) Waldemar Fornalik	Zagłębie Lubin
August 2023	(Poland) Adrian Siemieniec	Jagiellonia Białystok
September 2023	(Poland) Jacek Magiera	Śląsk Wrocław
October 2023	(Sweden) Jens Gustafsson	Pogoń Szczecin
November 2023	(Poland) Jacek Magiera	Śląsk Wrocław
December 2023	(Poland) Tomasz Tułacz	Puszcza Niepołomice
February 2024	(Sweden) Jens Gustafsson	Pogoń Szczecin
March 2024	(Poland) Jan Urban	Górnik Zabrze
April 2024	(Poland) Jan Urban	Górnik Zabrze
May 2024	(Poland) Jacek Magiera	Śląsk Wrocław

=== Annual awards ===
Award	Player	Club
Player of the Season	(Poland) Kamil Grosicki	Pogoń Szczecin
Young Player of the Season	(Poland) Dominik Marczuk	Jagiellonia Białystok
Goalkeeper of the Season	(Poland) Mateusz Kochalski	Stal Mielec
Defender of the Season	(Poland) Bartłomiej Wdowik	Jagiellonia Białystok
Midfielder of the Season	(Poland) Kamil Grosicki	Pogoń Szczecin
Forward of the Season	(Spain) Erik Expósito	Śląsk Wrocław
Coach of the Season	(Poland) Adrian Siemieniec	Jagiellonia Białystok

Team of the Season
Goalkeeper	(Serbia) Zlatan Alomerović (Jagiellonia Białystok)			
Defenders	(Spain) Adrián Diéguez (Jagiellonia Białystok)	(Poland) Bartłomiej Wdowik (Jagiellonia Białystok)	(Poland) Rafał Janicki (Górnik Zabrze)	(Poland) Mateusz Skrzypczak (Jagiellonia Białystok)
Midfielders	(Portugal) Nené (Jagiellonia Białystok)		(Portugal) Josué (Legia Warsaw)	(Poland) Kamil Grosicki (Pogoń Szczecin)
Forwards	(Spain) Erik Expósito (Śląsk Wrocław)		(Belarus) Ilya Shkurin (Stal Mielec)	(Democratic Republic of the Congo) Afimico Pululu (Jagiellonia Białystok)

== Number of teams by region ==
Number	Region	Team(s)
4	Silesian Voivodeship	Górnik Zabrze, Piast Gliwice, Raków Częstochowa and Ruch Chorzów
2	Greater Poland Voivodeship	Lech Poznań and Warta Poznań
2	Łódź Voivodeship	Widzew Łódź and ŁKS Łódź
2	Lesser Poland Voivodeship	Cracovia and Puszcza Niepołomice
2	Masovian Voivodeship	Legia Warsaw and Radomiak Radom
2	Lower Silesian Voivodeship	Zagłębie Lubin and Śląsk Wrocław
1	Podlaskie Voivodeship	Jagiellonia Białystok
1	West Pomeranian Voivodeship	Pogoń Szczecin
1	Podkarpackie Voivodeship	Stal Mielec
1	Świętokrzyskie Voivodeship	Korona Kielce
0	Kuyavian-Pomeranian Voivodeship	
0	Lublin Voivodeship	
0	Lubusz Voivodeship	
0	Opole Voivodeship	
0	Pomeranian Voivodeship	
0	Warmian-Masurian Voivodeship	

== See also ==
- 2023–24 I liga
- 2023–24 II liga
- 2023–24 III liga
- 2023–24 Polish Cup
- 2023 Polish Super Cup
