= Adrian Siemieniec =

Polish football manager (born 1992)

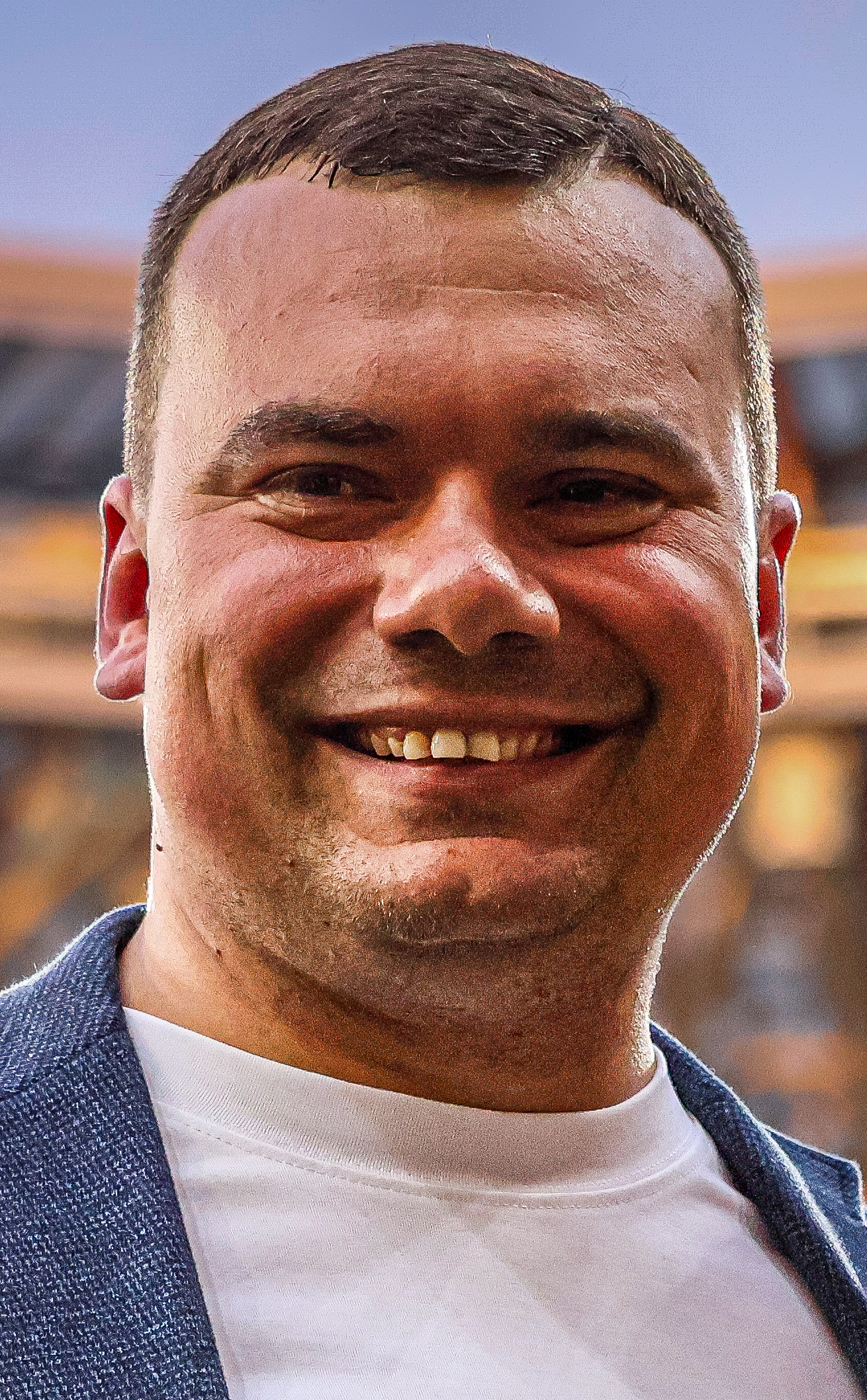
- Siemieniec as coach of Jagiellonia Białystok in 2025

Personal information
- Date of birth: 13 January 1992 (age 34)
- Place of birth: Czeladź, Poland

Team information
- Current team: Jagiellonia Białystok (manager)

Youth career
- Years: Team
- MCKS Czeladź
- Polonia Bytom

Managerial career
- 2013–2014: Rozwój Katowice II
- 2022–2023: Jagiellonia Białystok II
- 2023–: Jagiellonia Białystok

Adrian Siemieniec (born 13 January 1992) is a Polish professional football manager and former player who is currently the manager of Ekstraklasa club Jagiellonia Białystok.

== Playing career ==
A native of Czeladź, Poland, Siemieniec joined the academy of Polonia Bytom as a youth player. He retired at a young age after coming to the conclusion that he would not be able to break into professional football.

== Managerial career ==
=== Early career ===
Siemieniec's coaching career started when he was a student at the University of Physical Education in Katowice. He joined Rozwój Katowice's staff as an intern, and remained there until 2014 as an assistant coach under Mirosław Smyła and Dietmar Brehmer, while simultaneously managing Rozwój's reserve team in his final year in Katowice.

In 2014, he joined Chrobry Głogów as an assistant manager to Ireneusz Mamrot, and would later follow him to Jagiellonia Białystok in 2017, Arka Gdynia in 2020, ŁKS Łódź in 2021 and Jagiellonia again in 2021.

=== Jagiellonia Białystok ===
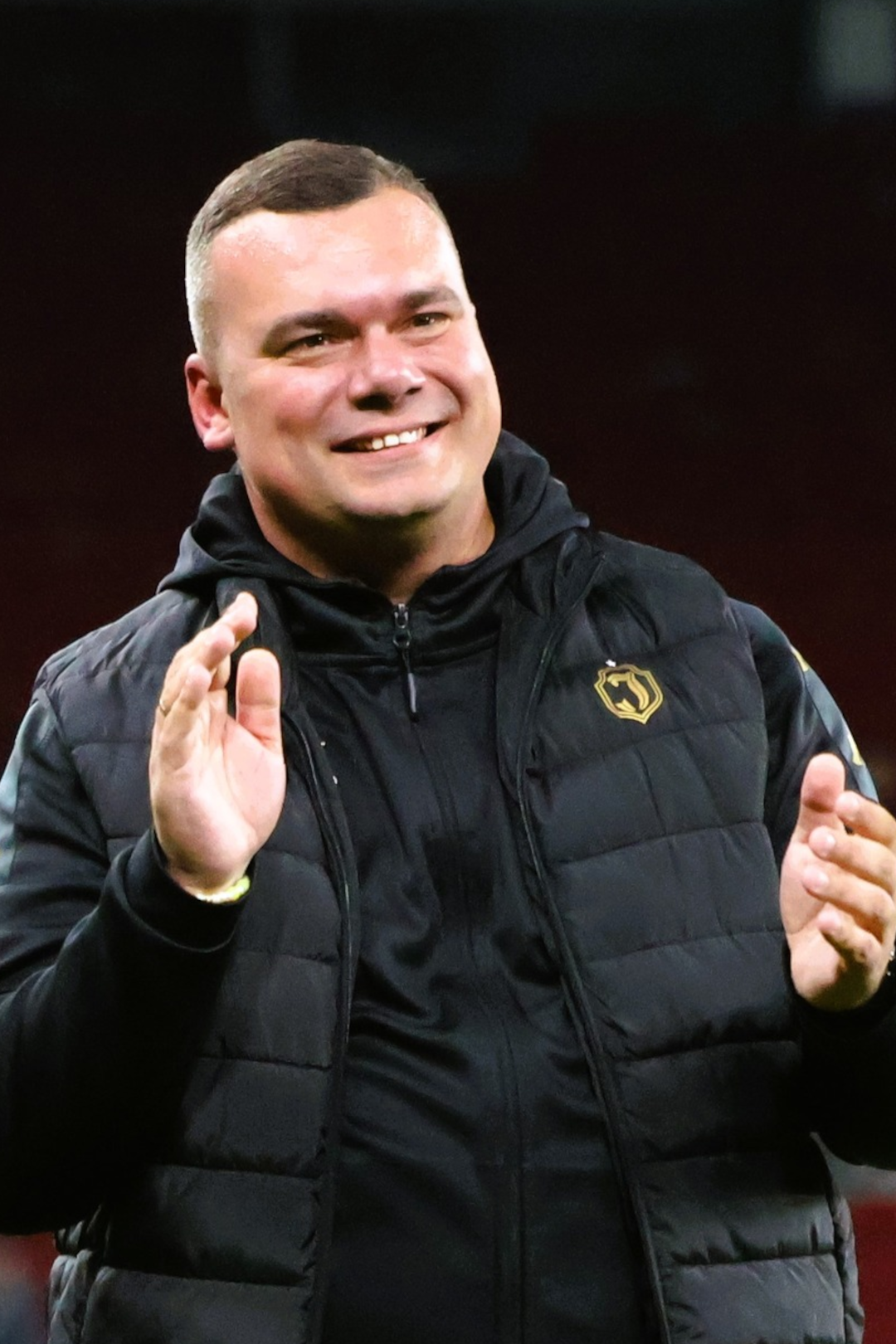
Siemieniec with Jagiellonia Białystok in 2024

On 14 January 2022, Siemieniec was appointed manager of Jagiellonia Białystok II. On 4 April 2023, following Maciej Stolarczyk's dismissal, he took on the role of manager of Jagiellonia's senior team until the end of the season. At the age of thirty-one, he became the youngest manager in the Polish top flight. In January 2024, Jagiellonia prolonged Siemieniec's contract for an additional two years.

In the 2023–24 season, Siemieniec led Jagiellonia to an unlikely title win, clinching their first-ever top-flight championship with a 3–0 home victory over Warta Poznań on the last matchday of the season. For this accomplishment, he was voted the Ekstraklasa Coach of the Season.

Under Siemieniec, Jagiellonia qualified for a group or league phase of a UEFA competition for the first time, even reaching the quarter finals of the 2024–25 UEFA Conference League where they were eliminated by Real Betis. They finished the league season in third place.

In the 2025–26 season, Jagiellonia reached the UEFA Conference League knockout stages for a second year in row, exiting the competition in the knockout phase play-offs after a 5–4 loss on aggregate to Italian side Fiorentina. Domestically, they again finished third in the Ekstraklasa, level on points with runners-up Górnik Zabrze.

In August 2026, Siemieniec led Jagiellonia to their third consecutive European qualification, this time to the UEFA Europa League, by defeating Rangers and Iberia.

== Personal life ==
Siemieniec has a wife and four children.

== Managerial statistics ==
As of match played 21 November 2026

Managerial record by team and tenure
Team	From	To	Record							
Team	From	To	G	W	D	L	GF	GA	GD	Win %
Jagiellonia Białystok II	14 January 2022	4 April 2023	42	22	7	13	94	61	+33	52.38
Jagiellonia Białystok	4 April 2023	Present	176	88	41	47	311	225	+86	50.00
Total			218	110	48	60	405	286	+119	50.46

== Honours ==
Jagiellonia Białystok

- Ekstraklasa: 2023–24
- Polish Super Cup: 2024

Individual

- Polish Coach of the Year: 2024, 2025
- Ekstraklasa Coach of the Season: 2023–24
- Ekstraklasa Coach of the Month: August 2023, July 2024, October 2024, August 2025
- Polish Union of Footballers' Ekstraklasa Coach of the Season: 2023–24
