= Waldemar Fornalik =

Polish footballer

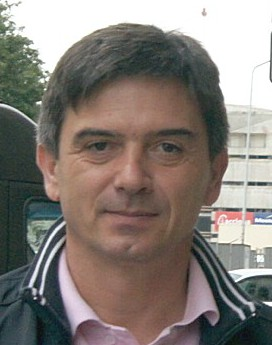
- Fornalik in 2012

Personal information
- Full name: Waldemar Fornalik
- Date of birth: 11 April 1963 (age 63)
- Place of birth: Myślenice, Poland
- Height: 1.73 m (5 ft 8 in)
- Position: Defender

Team information
- Current team: Ruch Chorzów (manager)

Senior career*
| Years | Team | Apps | (Gls) |
| 1982–1994 | Ruch Chorzów | 233 | (4) |

Managerial career
- 1996: Polonia Bytom
- 2001: Górnik Zabrze
- 2002–2004: Górnik Zabrze
- 2005–2006: Odra Wodzisław
- 2006–2007: Polonia Warsaw
- 2008: GKS Bełchatów (ME)
- 2008–2009: Widzew Łódź
- 2009–2012: Ruch Chorzów
- 2012–2013: Poland
- 2014–2017: Ruch Chorzów
- 2017–2022: Piast Gliwice
- 2022–2024: Zagłębie Lubin
- 2025–: Ruch Chorzów
- * Club domestic league appearances and goals

Waldemar Fornalik (born 11 April 1963) is a Polish professional football manager and former player who is currently the manager of I liga club Ruch Chorzów. A one-club man, he spent his entire playing career with Ruch. From July 2012 to October 2013, he managed the Poland national team.

== Playing career ==
Fornalik won the 1988–89 Ekstraklasa with Ruch Chorzów.

== Managerial career ==
Following the end of his playing career, Fornalik began a managing career. He was in charge of Górnik Zabrze and Odra Wodzisław in the early 2000s. He won the bronze medal with Ruch Chorzów in the 2009–10 Ekstraklasa season. In the 2011–12 season, he led Ruch to second place, the highest placement since winning the title in 1989.

In July 2012, Fornalik became the coach of the Poland national team after the dismissal of Franciszek Smuda. On 16 October 2013, after a 0–1 loss to Ukraine in Kharkiv, which confirmed that Poland would not be going to the 2014 World Cup finals in Brazil, and a 0–2 loss to England at Wembley Stadium the previous night, PZPN sacked Fornalik due to not fulfilling his contract objectives.

On 19 September 2017, he became the manager of Piast Gliwice. Under Fornalik's rule, Piast turned into overachievers, consistently competing for spots in the upper half of the table, which resulted in winning the championship at the end of the 2018–19 season, finishing third two years later and two short-lived European campaigns. On 25 October 2022, following a poor start to the 2022–23 campaign, Fornalik left Piast and was replaced by Aleksandar Vuković two days later.

On 29 November 2022, Fornalik was announced as the new head coach of Zagłębie Lubin, agreeing to a contract until the end of the 2023–24 season. He extended his deal for a further year on 26 June 2024. On 22 September 2024, Zagłębie suffered a 1–5 away loss to Raków Częstochowa, leaving the club in relegation zone with eight points after nine rounds of the 2024–25 season. The following day, Fornalik was sacked by Zagłębie's board.

On 6 August 2025, Fornalik returned to Ruch Chorzów for his third stint as manager.

== Managerial statistics ==
As of match played 20 November 2026

Managerial record by team and tenure
| Team | From | To | Record | | | | |
| Team | From | To | G | W | D | L | Win % |
|---|---|---|---|---|---|---|---|
| Górnik Zabrze | 10 May 2001 | 31 October 2001 | 26 | 7 | 10 | 9 | 26.92 |
| Górnik Zabrze | 12 January 2002 | 4 April 2004 | 62 | 24 | 20 | 18 | 38.71 |
| Odra Wodzisław | 20 June 2005 | 28 August 2006 | 41 | 14 | 13 | 14 | 34.15 |
| Polonia Warsaw | 23 October 2006 | 29 October 2007 | 38 | 23 | 7 | 8 | 60.53 |
| Widzew Łódź | 2 June 2008 | 9 January 2009 | 20 | 11 | 5 | 4 | 55.00 |
| Ruch Chorzów | 27 April 2009 | 23 April 2012 | 120 | 57 | 28 | 35 | 47.50 |
| Poland | 10 July 2012 | 16 October 2013 | 18 | 8 | 4 | 6 | 44.44 |
| Ruch Chorzów | 7 October 2014 | 23 April 2017 | 97 | 33 | 18 | 46 | 34.02 |
| Piast Gliwice | 19 September 2017 | 27 October 2022 | 205 | 88 | 53 | 64 | 42.93 |
| Zagłębie Lubin | 29 November 2022 | 23 September 2024 | 62 | 24 | 14 | 24 | 38.71 |
| Ruch Chorzów | 6 August 2025 | Present | 49 | 21 | 14 | 14 | 42.86 |
| Career total | | | 738 | 310 | 186 | 242 | 42.01 |

== Honours ==
=== Player ===
Ruch Chorzów

- Ekstraklasa: 1988–89

=== Manager ===
Piast Gliwice

- Ekstraklasa: 2018–19

Individual

- Polish Coach of the Year: 2009, 2012, 2019
- Ekstraklasa Coach of the Season: 2011–12, 2018–19
- Ekstraklasa Coach of the Month: April 2011, November 2011, March 2012, March 2017, July 2018, September 2018, March 2019, April 2019, May 2019, July 2023
- I liga Coach of the Month: October 2026

== See also ==
- List of one-club men in association football
