= Erik Expósito =

Spanish footballer

Personal information
- Full name: Erik Alexander Expósito Hernández
- Date of birth: 23 June 1996 (age 30)
- Place of birth: Santa Cruz de Tenerife, Spain
- Height: 1.90 m (6 ft 3 in)
- Position: Forward

Team information
- Current team: Al Ahli
- Number: 10

Youth career
- Unión La Paz
- Verdellada
- Paracuellos
- Barranco Hondo
- Lorquí
- 2015: Málaga

Senior career*
Years	Team	Apps	(Gls)
2015–2016	Málaga B	1	(0)
2016	→ Rayo Cantabria (loan)	18	(6)
2016–2019	Las Palmas B	54	(29)
2017–2019	Las Palmas	11	(1)
2018–2019	→ Córdoba (loan)	7	(0)
2019–2024	Śląsk Wrocław	152	(54)
2024–	Al Ahli	42	(9)
- * Club domestic league appearances and goals as of 14 September 2026

Erik Alexander Expósito Hernández (born 23 June 1996) is a Spanish professional footballer who plays as a forward for Qatar Stars League club Al Ahli.

== Club career ==
Born in Santa Cruz de Tenerife, Canary Islands, Expósito joined Málaga CF's youth setup in January 2015, after stints at AJ Unión La Paz, CD Verdellada, CD Paracuellos, Atlético Barranco Hondo and ADM Lorquí. He made his debut with the reserves on 27 September of that year, coming on as a substitute for goalscorer Kuki Zalazar in a 5–0 Tercera División home routing of Atarfe Industrial CF.

On 2 January 2016, he was loaned to fellow fourth tier club Deportivo Rayo Cantabria, until June. After appearing regularly he moved to another reserve team, UD Las Palmas Atlético in the same division on 18 July.

On 26 April 2017, Expósito made his first team – and La Liga – debut, starting in a 3–0 away loss against CD Leganés. On 16 June, he was promoted to the main squad ahead of the 2017–18 campaign.

Expósito scored his first professional goal on 5 March 2018, netting the opener in a 2–1 loss at Celta de Vigo. He contributed with ten first-team appearances during the campaign, as his side suffered relegation.

On 31 August 2018, Expósito was loaned to Segunda División side Córdoba CF, for one year. The following 25 January, after being rarely used, his loan was cut short.

Expósito moved abroad on 27 June 2019, signing a three-year deal with Polish Ekstraklasa club Śląsk Wrocław after his Las Palmas contract expired. On 21 September, he scored a hat-trick in a 4–4 home draw against local rivals Zagłębie Lubin.

After finishing the 2021–22 and 2022–23 campaigns in the last spot safe from relegation, Expósito, as the club's captain, led Śląsk to a second-place finish in the 2023–24 Ekstraklasa. He ended the season with 19 goals in 33 league appearances, making him the league's best goalscorer. For his efforts, he was named the Ekstraklasa Forward of the Season. On 7 June 2024, he confirmed he would be leaving the club at the end of the month once his contract expires.

On 11 June 2024, it was announced he would join Qatari side Umm Salal on 1 July that year. However, the deal was cancelled shortly after, and Expósito became a free agent on 30 June.

Expósito would continue his career in Qatar after all; on 4 July 2024, he joined Al Ahli on a three-year deal.

== Career statistics ==
As of match played 18 May 2025

Appearances and goals by club, season and competition
Club	Season	League			National cup (Note: Includes Copa del Rey, Polish Cup, Emir of Qatar Cup)		Continental		Other		Total	
Club	Season	Division	Apps	Goals	Apps	Goals	Apps	Goals	Apps	Goals	Apps	Goals
Las Palmas	2016–17	La Liga	2	0	0	0	—		—		2	0
Las Palmas	2017–18	La Liga	9	1	0	0	—		—		9	1
Las Palmas	Total		11	1	0	0	—		—		11	1
Córdoba (loan)	2018–19	Segunda División	7	0	3	0	—		—		10	0
Śląsk Wrocław	2019–20	Ekstraklasa	35	8	1	0	—		—		36	8
Śląsk Wrocław	2020–21	Ekstraklasa	27	9	0	0	—		—		27	9
Śląsk Wrocław	2021–22	Ekstraklasa	28	11	1	0	5 (Note: Appearances in UEFA Europa Conference League)	1	—		34	12
Śląsk Wrocław	2022–23	Ekstraklasa	29	7	4	3	—		—		33	10
Śląsk Wrocław	2023–24	Ekstraklasa	33	19	1	0	—		—		34	19
Śląsk Wrocław	Total		152	54	7	3	5	1	—		164	58
Al Ahli	2024–25	Qatar Stars League	22	7	3	0	—		5 (Note: Four appearances and one goal in Qatari Stars Cup, one appearance in Qatar Cup)	3	30	10
Career total			192	62	13	3	5	1	5	3	215	69

== Honours ==
Individual

- Ekstraklasa top scorer: 2023–24
- Ekstraklasa Forward of the Season: 2023–24
- Ekstraklasa Player of the Month: August 2023, September 2023, October 2023
- Polish Union of Footballers' Ekstraklasa Team of the Season: 2023–24
