= Zbigniew Smółka =

Polish footballer (born 1972)

Personal information
- Date of birth: 12 May 1972 (age 54)
- Place of birth: Wrocław, Poland
- Height: 1.93 m (6 ft 4 in)
- Position: Goalkeeper

Team information
- Current team: Stal Brzeg (manager)

Senior career*
Years	Team	Apps	(Gls)
2000	WKS Wieluń		
2000–2001	Polonia Środa Śląska		
2001–2002	KS Żórawina		
2002–2004	Inkopax Wrocław		
2004–2005	Bystrzyca Kąty Wrocławskie		
2005	Chrobry Głogów		
2005–2006	Polar Wrocław		
2006–2007	Odra Opole		
2007–2008	Arka Nowa Sól		

Managerial career
- 2007–2008: Arka Nowa Sól
- 2008–2009: Polonia/Sparta Świdnica
- 2009–2011: Czarni Żagań
- 2011–2012: MKS Kluczbork
- 2012: Ruch Radzionków
- 2012: LZS Piotrówka
- 2012–2013: Jarota Jarocin
- 2013–2014: MKS Oława
- 2014–2016: Odra Opole
- 2016: Zawisza Bydgoszcz
- 2016–2018: Stal Mielec
- 2018–2019: Arka Gdynia
- 2019: Widzew Łódź
- 2019–2020: Chojniczanka Chojnice
- 2021: Olimpia Grudziądz
- 2022–2024: Moto-Jelcz Oława
- 2024: Karkonosze Jelenia Góra
- 2024–: Stal Brzeg
- * Club domestic league appearances and goals

Zbigniew Smółka (born 12 May 1972) is a Polish professional football manager and former player, currently in charge of III liga club Stal Brzeg.

== Managerial statistics ==
As of match played 3 June 2026

Managerial record by team and tenure
Team	From	To	Record							
Team	From	To	G	W	D	L	GF	GA	GD	Win %
Arka Nowa Sól	July 2007	June 2008	37	14	7	16	55	66	−11	37.84
Polonia/Sparta Świdnica	4 July 2008	30 June 2009	39	24	7	8	81	49	+32	61.54
Czarni Żagań	1 July 2009	30 June 2011	70	24	20	26	102	95	+7	34.29
MKS Kluczbork	1 July 2011	9 May 2012	33	12	9	12	40	32	+8	36.36
Ruch Radzionków	3 July 2012	17 July 2012	0	0	0	0	0	0	+0	—
LZS Piotrówka	17 September 2012	19 September 2012	0	0	0	0	0	0	+0	—
Jarota Jarocin	19 September 2012	7 January 2013	9	2	3	4	7	13	−6	22.22
MKS Oława	6 May 2013	30 June 2014	50	31	8	11	110	47	+63	62.00
Odra Opole	1 July 2014	7 January 2016	65	46	11	8	153	52	+101	70.77
Zawisza Bydgoszcz	7 January 2016	9 June 2016	17	6	3	8	21	30	−9	35.29
Stal Mielec	2 October 2016	4 June 2018	59	26	13	20	82	69	+13	44.07
Arka Gdynia	8 June 2018	2 April 2019	32	9	9	14	42	44	−2	28.13
Widzew Łódź	30 May 2019	29 June 2019	0	0	0	0	0	0	+0	—
Chojniczanka Chojnice	6 November 2019	27 July 2020	18	4	2	12	22	38	−16	22.22
Olimpia Grudziądz	12 January 2021	30 June 2021	19	7	2	10	27	35	−8	36.84
Moto-Jelcz Oława	29 April 2022	9 April 2024	67	43	11	13	154	66	+88	64.18
Karkonosze Jelenia Góra	15 April 2024	30 June 2024	11	3	4	4	14	16	−2	27.27
Stal Brzeg	20 August 2024	Present	60	26	12	22	125	68	+57	43.33
Total			586	277	121	188	1,035	720	+315	47.27

== Honours ==
=== Managerial ===
MKS Oława

- Polish Cup (Wrocław regionals): 2013–14

Odra Opole

- Polish Cup (Opole regionals): 2014–15

Arka Gdynia

- Polish Super Cup: 2018

Stal Brzeg

- IV liga Opole: 2025–26
