= Jan Woś =

Polish footballer

Personal information
- Full name: Jan Woś
- Date of birth: 17 February 1974 (age 52)
- Place of birth: Pacanów, Poland
- Height: 1.77 m (5 ft 9 1/2 in)
- Position: Midfielder

Youth career
- 1988: Czantoria Nierodzim
- 1989–1991: Odra Wodzisław

Senior career*
Years	Team	Apps	(Gls)
1991–2001	Odra Wodzisław	199	(17)
2001–2002	Ruch Chorzów	48	(14)
2003	Dyskobolia Grodzisk	12	(0)
2004–2010	Odra Wodzisław	163	(11)
2011	Skra Częstochowa		

Managerial career
- 2011–2014: Skra Częstochowa
- 2014–2015: Unia Racibórz
- 2015–2018: Pniówek Pawłowice
- 2018–2020: GKS Jastrzębie (assistant)
- 2020–2021: Miedź Legnica (assistant)
- 2021–2023: Ruch Chorzów (assistant)
- 2023: Ruch Chorzów
- 2023–2024: Unia Turza Śląska U19
- 2024–2025: Unia Turza Śląska
- 2025–2026: Pniówek Pawłowice
- * Club domestic league appearances and goals

Jan Woś (born 17 February 1974) is a Polish professional football manager and former player who was most recently in charge of III liga club Pniówek Pawłowice.

== Managerial statistics ==
As of match played 29 November 2025

Managerial record by team and tenure
Team	From	To	Record							
Team	From	To	G	W	D	L	GF	GA	GD	Win %
Skra Częstochowa	21 June 2011	7 June 2014	98	56	19	23	188	97	+91	57.14
Unia Racibórz	2 July 2014	4 May 2015	23	8	5	10	44	61	−17	34.78
Pniówek Pawłowice	4 May 2015	14 April 2018	106	45	24	37	168	147	+21	42.45
Ruch Chorzów	6 November 2023	29 December 2023	6	0	5	1	9	10	−1	0.00
Unia Turza Śląska	28 October 2024	17 April 2025	12	1	2	9	8	28	−20	8.33
Pniówek Pawłowice	9 September 2025	2 February 2026	14	5	2	7	24	26	−2	35.71
Total			245	110	55	80	417	343	+74	44.90
