= Ben van Dael =

Dutch football manager (born 1965)

Personal information
- Date of birth: 3 March 1965 (age 61)
- Place of birth: Swalmen, Netherlands

Team information
- Current team: Helmond Sport U21 (head coach)

Managerial career
- Years: Team
- 2015–2016: Fortuna Sittard
- 2017–2018: Vitesse U19
- 2018–2019: Zagłębie Lubin
- 2025: Helmond Sport U21
- 2026–: Helmond Sport U21

Ben van Dael (born 3 March 1965) is a Dutch professional football manager who is currently in charge of Helmond Sport U21.
