= Aleksandar Vuković =

Serbian footballer (born 1979)

Personal information
- Date of birth: 25 August 1979 (age 47)
- Place of birth: Banja Luka, SR Bosnia and Herzegovina, Yugoslavia
- Height: 1.86 m (6 ft 1 in)
- Position: Midfielder

Team information
- Current team: Cracovia (manager)

Youth career
- 1993–1994: Borac Banja Luka
- 1994–1998: Partizan

Senior career*
Years	Team	Apps	(Gls)
1998–2000	Partizan	20	(3)
1998–1999	→ Teleoptik (loan)	23	(3)
2000–2001	Milicionar	17	(2)
2001–2004	Legia Warsaw	75	(4)
2004–2005	Ergotelis	5	(0)
2005–2008	Legia Warsaw	91	(7)
2009	Iraklis	9	(0)
2009–2013	Korona Kielce	76	(7)
Total		416	(26)

Managerial career
- 2016: Legia Warsaw (caretaker)
- 2018: Legia Warsaw (caretaker)
- 2019–2020: Legia Warsaw
- 2021–2022: Legia Warsaw
- 2022–2025: Piast Gliwice
- 2026: Widzew Łódź
- 2026–: Cracovia
- * Club domestic league appearances and goals

Aleksandar Vuković (Serbian Cyrillic: Александар Вуковић, pronounced [aleksǎndar ʋûːkoʋit͡ɕ]; born 25 August 1979) is a Serbian professional football manager and former player. He is currently in charge of Ekstraklasa club Cracovia.

== Club career ==
He started his career at Borac Banja Luka. Still young, he moved to FK Partizan youth team. Where he played until 2000. While in Serbia, he also played for FK Teleoptik and FK Milicionar. He signed a contract with Iraklis on 17 December 2008. He retired after a four-year stint in Ekstraklasa side Korona Kielce.

== Managerial career ==
=== Legia Warsaw ===
On 2 April 2019, Vuković was appointed manager of Legia Warsaw, having previously worked there in assistant and caretaker roles. In the 2019–20 season, he led the team to their 14th Ekstraklasa title. He was dismissed in the following season, after quickly dropping out of a UEFA Champions League qualifying and a league defeat at Górnik Zabrze.

On 13 December 2021, he was once again announced as the manager of Legia, following Marek Gołębiewski's resignation a day prior after a defeat to Wisła Płock, which saw Legia drop to the bottom of the league. In his first match after his return, Legia defeated Zagłębie Lubin 4–0 and left the relegation zone. He successfully led Legia away from relegation and finished 10th, eleven points clear of the relegation zone, winning 3–0 against Cracovia on the last match day. On the same day, Vuković left his role as Legia's manager.

=== Piast Gliwice ===
On 27 October 2022, Vuković replaced Waldemar Fornalik as the manager of Piast Gliwice. On 14 May 2024, shortly before the conclusion of the 2023–24 season, Piast announced they had exercised an option in Vuković's contract to keep him at the club until June 2025. On 27 March 2025, it was revealed he would leave the club at the end of the 2024–25 campaign.

=== Widzew Łódź ===
On 5 March 2026, Ekstraklasa side Widzew Łódź announced the appointment of Vuković as manager until the end of the 2026–27 season. He managed to guide the club to avoid relegation on the final matchday of the 2025–26 season following a 2–1 win over Piast Gliwice. Widzew won seven points in seven opening games of the 2026–27 season and was eliminated from the Polish Cup in the first round - as a result, Vuković was relieved of his duties on 10 September 2026.

=== Cracovia ===
On 11 November 2026, Vuković was appointed head coach of Ekstraklasa club Cracovia on a deal until the end of the 2027–28 season, with an option for another year, following the sacking of Bartosz Grzelak. In his first game in charge on 20 November, he led Cracovia to a 3–1 win at home against Jagiellonia Białystok.

== Personal life ==
A Bosnian Serb, he was granted Polish citizenship on 13 June 2008. He has a wife and a son.

== Managerial statistics ==
As of match played 20 November 2026

Managerial record by team and tenure
Team	Nat	From	To	Record							
Team	Nat	From	To	G	W	D	L	GF	GA	GD	Win %
Legia Warsaw (caretaker)	(Poland)	19 September 2016	24 September 2016	1	0	1	0	0	0	+0	0.00
Legia Warsaw (caretaker)	(Poland)	1 August 2018	13 August 2018	3	1	1	1	4	3	+1	33.33
Legia Warsaw	(Poland)	2 April 2019	21 September 2020	67	37	12	18	112	60	+52	55.22
Legia Warsaw	(Poland)	13 December 2021	21 May 2022	20	10	4	6	33	22	+11	50.00
Piast Gliwice	(Poland)	27 October 2022	30 June 2025	98	37	35	26	122	96	+26	37.76
Widzew Łódź	(Poland)	5 March 2026	10 September 2026	19	6	7	6	22	19	+3	31.58
Cracovia	(Poland)	11 November 2026	Present	1	1	0	0	3	1	+2	100.00
Total				209	92	60	57	296	201	+95	44.02

== Honours ==
=== Player ===
Partizan

- First League of FR Yugoslavia: 1998–99

Legia Warsaw

- Ekstraklasa: 2001–02, 2005–06
- Polish Cup: 2007–08
- Polish League Cup: 2001–02
- Polish Super Cup: 2008

=== Manager ===
Legia Warsaw

- Ekstraklasa: 2019–20

Individual

- Ekstraklasa Coach of the Season: 2019–20
- Ekstraklasa Coach of the Month: March 2022, April 2023
