= 2024–25 Jagiellonia Białystok season =

Jagiellonia Białystok
2024–25 season
- Manager: Adrian Siemieniec
- Stadium: Białystok Stadium
- Ekstraklasa: 3rd
- Polish Cup: Quarter-finals
- Polish Super Cup: Winner
- UEFA Champions League: Third qualifying round
- UEFA Europa League: Play-off round
- UEFA Conference League: Quarter-finals
- Top goalscorer: League: Jesús Imaz (16); All: Jesús Imaz (24)
- Highest home attendance: 20,029 vs Legia Warsaw
- Lowest home attendance: 10,243 vs TSC
- Average home league attendance: 16,473
- Biggest win: Jagiellonia Białystok 5–0 Radomiak Radom
- Biggest defeat: Lech Poznań 5-0 Jagiellonia Białystok
Home colours	Away colours	Third colours

The 2024–25 season was the 105th season in the history of Jagiellonia Białystok, and the club's 18th consecutive season in Ekstraklasa. In addition to the domestic league, the team participated in the Polish Cup, the Polish Super Cup, the UEFA Champions League, the UEFA Europa League, and the UEFA Conference League.

== Transfers ==
=== In ===
Pos.	Player	Transferred from	Fee	Date	Source
DF	(Poland) Kacper Tabiś	(Poland) Chrobry Głogów	Loan return	30 June 2024	
MF	(Poland) Oliwier Wojciechowski	(Poland) Polonia Warsaw	Loan return	30 June 2024	
GK	(Poland) Max Stryjek	(England) Wycombe Wanderers	Free	1 July 2024	
FW	(France) Lamine Diaby-Fadiga	(France) Paris FC	Free	1 July 2024	
MF	(Poland) Filip Wolski	(Poland) Lech Poznań		1 July 2024	
MF	(Spain) Miki Villar	(Poland) Wisła Kraków	Free	2 July 2024	
DF	(Portugal) João Moutinho	(Italy) Spezia	Loan	9 July 2024	
DF	(Portugal) Tomás Silva	Unattached	Free	2 August 2024	
FW	(North Macedonia) Darko Churlinov	(England) Burnley	Loan	7 August 2024	
MF	(Poland) Marcin Listkowski	(Italy) Lecce		20 August 2024	
DF	(Poland) Cezary Polak	(Poland) Kotwica Kołobrzeg	€200K	3 September 2024	
MF	(Slovakia) Peter Kováčik	(Italy) Como 1907	Loan	4 September 2024	
MF	(United States) Leon Flach	Unattached	Free	15 January 2025	
MF	(Poland) Norbert Wojtuszek	(Poland) Górnik Zabrze	€450K	28 January 2025	
MF	(Cameroon) Enzo Ebosse	(Italy) Udinese	Loan	29 January 2025	
FW	(Portugal) Edi Semedo	(Cyprus) Aris Limassol	Loan	15 February 2025	

=== Out ===
Pos.	Player	Transferred to	Fee	Date	Source
FW	(Germany) Kaan Caliskaner	(Germany) Eintracht Braunschweig	Loan return	30 June 2024	
DF	(Poland) Bartłomiej Wdowik	(Portugal) SC Braga	€1,500,000	1 July 2024	
FW	(Brazil) Vinícius Matheus	(Poland) Lechia Tomaszów Mazowiecki		1 July 2024	
DF	(Bosnia and Herzegovina) Bojan Nastić	(Poland) Wisła Płock	End of contract	1 July 2024	
MF	(Poland) Tomasz Kupisz	(Poland) Hutnik Warsaw	End of contract	1 July 2024	
GK	(Serbia) Zlatan Alomerović	(Cyprus) AEK Larnaca	End of contract	1 July 2024	
MF	(Spain) José Naranjo	(Spain) UD Ibiza	Contract termination	1 July 2024	
FW	(Poland) Krzysztof Toporkiewicz	(Poland) KKS 1925 Kalisz	End of contract	1 July 2024	
DF	(Poland) Kacper Tabiś	(Poland) Chrobry Głogów		12 July 2024	
DF	(Poland) Dominik Marczuk	(United States) Real Salt Lake	€1,500,000	14 August 2024	
DF	(Kosovo) Jetmir Haliti	(Czech Republic) Mladá Boleslav	Undisclosed	3 January 2025	
GK	(Poland) Miłosz Piekutowski	(Poland) Stal Stalowa Wola	Loan	7 January 2025	
MF	(Portugal) Nené	(China) Yunnan Yukun	€400,000	8 January 2025	
MF	(France) Aurélien Nguiamba	Released		10 January 2025	
MF	(Slovakia) Peter Kováčik	(Italy) Como 1907	Loan return	5 February 2025	
MF	(Poland) Marcin Listkowski	(Poland) Zagłębie Lubin	Loan	21 February 2025	

== Friendlies ==
=== Pre-season ===
28 June 2024 Friendly	Jagiellonia Białystok (Poland)	1–1	(Czech Republic) Sigma Olomouc	Opalenica
11:00	Pululu 29'		Hadaš 31'	Attendance: 45

3 July 2024 Friendly	Miedź Legnica (Poland)	1–3	(Poland) Jagiellonia Białystok	Opalenica
12:00	Kaczmarski 33'		Haliti 8'; Hansen 26'; Skrzypczak 53' (pen.)	Stadium: Hotel Remes Sport & Spa

6 July 2024 Friendly	Legia Warsaw (Poland)	2–0	(Poland) Jagiellonia Białystok	Urszulin
11:00	Nsame 29'; Gual 46'		Pululu (red card) 42'	Stadium: Legia Training Center

13 July 2024 Friendly	Jagiellonia Białystok (Poland)	2–0	(Lithuania) Kauno Žalgiris	Białystok
	Afimico Pululu 45' (pen.); Jarosław Kubicki 83'			Stadium: Białystok Stadium

13 July 2024 Friendly	Jagiellonia Białystok (Poland)	1–1	(Poland) Turośnianka	Białystok
18:00	Haliti 56'		Kiczuk 53'	Stadium: Ośrodek treningowy Jagiellonii Białystok

=== Mid-season ===
15 January 2025 Friendly	Jagiellonia Białystok (Poland)	1–1	(Croatia) Dinamo Zagreb	Aksu
17:00 TRT	Silva 54'		Stojković 60'	Stadium: Mardan Sports Complex

19 January 2025 Friendly	Jagiellonia Białystok (Poland)	7–0	(Bulgaria) CKSA 1948	Serik
11:00 TRT	Hansen 14'; Silva 58'; Churlinov 84'; Rapnouil 89' (o.g.); Pietuszewski 94'; Mazurek 96'; Villar 112'			Stadium: Fanatic Tour Serik Sport Center

24 January 2025 Friendly	Jagiellonia Białystok (Poland)	2–0	(Slovenia) NK Maribor	Belek
11:00 TRT	Diaby-Fadiga 37' (pen.), 62' (pen.)			Stadium: Cornelia Sport Center

24 January 2025 Friendly	Jagiellonia Białystok (Poland)	1–1	(Serbia) FK Partizan	Belek
17:00 TRT	Pululu 50'		Kovač 21'	Stadium: Cornelia Sport Center

== Competitions ==
=== Overall record ===
Competition	First match	Last match	Starting round	Final position	Record							
Competition	First match	Last match	Starting round	Final position	Pld	W	D	L	GF	GA	GD	Win %
Ekstraklasa	19 July 2024	24 May 2025	Matchday 1	3rd	34	17	10	7	56	42	+14	50.00
Polish Cup	30 October 2024	26 February 2025	Round of 32	Quarter-finals	3	2	0	1	7	2	+5	66.67
Polish Super Cup	2 April 2025		Final	Winners	1	1	0	0	1	0	+1	100.00
UEFA Champions League	23 July 2024	13 August 2024	Second qualifying round	Third qualifying round	4	2	0	2	8	6	+2	50.00
UEFA Europa League	22 August 2024	29 August 2024	Play-off round	Play-off round	2	0	0	2	1	7	−6	0.00
UEFA Conference League	3 October 2024	17 April 2025	League phase	Quarter-finals	12	6	3	3	17	12	+5	50.00
Total					56	28	13	15	90	69	+21	50.00

Last updated: 24 May 2025
Source: Soccerway

=== Ekstraklasa ===
==== League table ====
Pos	Team	Pld	W	D	L	GF	GA	GD	Pts	Qualification or relegation
1	Lech Poznań (C)	34	22	4	8	68	31	+37	70	Qualification for Champions League second qualifying round
2	Raków Częstochowa	34	20	9	5	51	23	+28	69	Qualification for Conference League second qualifying round
3	Jagiellonia Białystok	34	17	10	7	56	42	+14	61	Qualification for Conference League second qualifying round
4	Pogoń Szczecin	34	17	7	10	59	40	+19	58	
5	Legia Warsaw	34	15	9	10	60	45	+15	54	Qualification for Europa League first qualifying round (Note: The 2024–25 Polish Cup winners (Legia Warsaw) qualify for the Europa League first qualifying round.)

Source: ekstraklasa.org 90minut.pl
Rules for classification: 1) Points; 2) Head-to-head points; 3) Head-to-head goal difference; 4) Goal difference; 5) Goals scored; 6) Number of wins; 7) Number of away wins; 8) Lower number of points based on yellow and red cards (red card = 3 points, yellow card = 1 point, sending-off = 3 points - including 1 point for first yellow card); 9) Fairplay ranking; 10) Draw.
(Note: Head-to-head record is used only after all the matches between the teams in question have been played)
(C) Champions

==== Results summary ====
Overall								Home						Away					
Pld	W	D	L	GF	GA	GD	Pts	W	D	L	GF	GA	GD	W	D	L	GF	GA	GD
34	17	10	7	56	42	+14	61	9	6	2	33	19	+14	8	4	5	23	23	0

Source: Worldfootball

==== Results by round ====
Round	1	2	3	4	5	6	7	8	9	10	11	12	13	14	15	16	17	18	19	20	21	22	23	24	25	26	27	28	29	30	31	32	33	34
Ground	H	A	H	A	H	A	H	A	H	A	H	A	H	A	H	H	A	A	H	A	H	A	H	A	H	A	H	A	H	A	H	A	A	H
Result	W	W	W	W	L	L	W	L	W	W	D	W	W	W	D	D	D	D	W	L	W	D	W	W	W	L	D	W	L	L	D	W	D	D
Position	2	1	1	1	1	8	6	7	7	2	4	3	2	2	2	2	3	3	2	2	2	3	3	3	2	2	3	3	3	3	3	3	3	3

Source: Worldfootball
A = Away; H = Home; W = Win; D = Draw; L = Loss

==== Matches ====
19 July 2024 1	Jagiellonia Białystok	2–0	Puszcza Niepołomice	Białystok
18:00	Skrzypczak (yellow card) 55'; Nené 78'; Diaby-Fadiga (yellow card) 87', (goal) 90+8'; Abramowicz (yellow card) 90+5'		Abramowicz (yellow card) 41'; Crăciun (yellow card) 76'; Stępień (yellow card) 83'	Stadium: Białystok Stadium; Attendance: 17,157; Referee: Damian Kos

27 July 2024 2	Radomiak Radom	2–3	Jagiellonia Białystok	Radom
17:30 UTC+2	Rocha 52' (pen.), 77'		Kubicki 34', 40'; Abramowicz (yellow card) 48'; Villar 88'	Stadium: Czachor Brothers Stadium; Attendance: 8,563; Referee: Piotr Lasyk

3 August 2024 3	Jagiellonia Białystok	2–0	Stal Mielec	Białystok
17:30	Pululu 24', (yellow card) 31'; Nguiamba (yellow card) 44'; Imaz 67'; Hansen (penalty missed) 70'; Marczuk (yellow card) 90'		Gerbowski (yellow card) 66'	Stadium: Białystok Stadium; Attendance: 15,719; Referee: Damian Sylwestrzak

17 August 2024 5	Jagiellonia Białystok	2–4	Cracovia	Białystok
14:45	Diaby-Fadiga 12'; Kubicki 26'		Källman 3', 53'; Jugas 30'; Bochnak 90+4'	Stadium: Białystok Stadium; Attendance: 17,078; Referee: Szymon Marciniak

25 August 2024 6	GKS Katowice	3–1	Jagiellonia Białystok	Katowice
14:45	Błąd 2'; Kowalczyk 73'; Repka 90+7'		Pululu 18'	Stadium: GKS Katowice Stadium; Attendance: 6,690; Referee: Daniel Stefański

1 September 2024 7	Jagiellonia Białystok	1–0	Widzew Łódź	Białystok
20:15	Pululu 2'			Stadium: Białystok Stadium; Attendance: 13,076; Referee: Tomasz Kwiatowski

14 September 2024 8	Lech Poznań	5–0	Jagiellonia Białystok	Poznań
20:15	Sousa 25'; Hotić 41'; Szymczak 81' (pen.); Haliti 87' (o.g.); Jagiełło 90+3'			Stadium: ENEA Stadion; Attendance: 32,365; Referee: Daniel Stefański

21 September 2024 9	Jagiellonia Białystok	3–2	Lechia Gdańsk	Białystok
14:45	Silva 13'; Imaz 72'; Skrzypcak 76' (pen.)		Vyunnyk 16'; Khlan 59'	Stadium: Białystok Stadium; Attendance: 15,101; Referee: Jarosław Przybył

25 September 2024 4	Motor Lublin	0–2	Jagiellonia Białystok	Lublin
19:00			Romanczuk 4'; Hansen 50'	Stadium: Arena Lublin; Attendance: 10,812; Referee: Paweł Malec
Note: Postponed from 10 August.

29 September 2024 10	Piast Gliwice	0–1	Jagiellonia Białystok	Gliwice
17:30			Hansen 32'	Stadium: Piotr Wieczorek Municipal Stadium; Attendance: 5,128; Referee: Wojciech Myć

6 October 2024 11	Jagiellonia Białystok	1–1	Legia Warsaw	Białystok
20:15	Imaz 32'		Gual 67'	Stadium: Białystok Stadium; Attendance: 20,029; Referee: Szymon Marciniak

19 October 2024 12	Zagłębie Lubin	1–3	Jagiellonia Białystok	Lubin
17:30	Ławniczak 75'		Imaz 20', 58'; Hansen 24'	Stadium: Lubin Stadium; Attendance: 6,283; Referee: Daniel Stefański

27 October 2024 13	Jagiellonia Białystok	3–1	Korona Kielce	Białystok
14:45	Nené 10'; Imaz 51'; Churlinov 67'		Dalmau 49'	Stadium: Białystok Stadium; Attendance: 15,089; Referee: Piotr Lasyk

3 November 2024 14	Górnik Zabrze	0–2	Jagiellonia Białystok	Zabrze
14:45			Imaz 65'; Churlinov 69'	Stadium: Arena Zabrze; Attendance: 18,079; Referee: Daniel Stefański

10 November 2024 15	Jagiellonia Białystok	2–2	Raków Częstochowa	Białystok
14:45	Imaz 68'; Pululu 90+11' (pen.)		Ivi 4' (pen.); Arsenić 87'; Berggren (red card) 90+8'	Stadium: Białystok Stadium; Attendance: 17,089; Referee: Jarosław Przybył

22 November 2024 16	Jagiellonia Białystok	2–2	Śląsk Wrocław	Białystok
20:30	Diaby-Fadiga 39'; Imaz 70'		Ortiz 34'; Jezierski 88'	Stadium: Białystok Stadium; Attendance: 14,579; Referee: Karol Arys

1 December 2024 17	Pogoń Szczecin	1–1	Jagiellonia Białystok	Szczecin
14:45	Koulouris 14'		Imaz 54'	Stadium: Florian Krygier Municipal Stadium; Attendance: 17,958; Referee: Szymon Marciniak

8 December 2024 18	Puszcza Niepołomice	1–1	Jagiellonia Białystok	Kraków
14:45	Cholewiak 38'		Nené 64'	Stadium: Józef Piłsudski Cracovia Stadium; Attendance: 2,124; Referee: Damian Sylwestrzak

2 February 2025 19	Jagiellonia Białystok	5–0	Radomiak Radom	Białystok
14:45	Villar 5'; Pululu 7', 33'; Imaz 10', 45'			Stadium: Białystok Stadium; Attendance: 16,107; Referee: Szymon Marciniak

7 February 2025 20	Stal Mielec	2–1	Jagiellonia Białystok	Mielec
18:00	Dadok 22'; Wlazło 29' (pen.)		Pululu 14'	Stadium: Mielec Stadium; Attendance: 5,039; Referee: Marcin Szczerbowicz

16 February 2025 21	Jagiellonia Białystok	3–0	Motor Lublin	Białystok
17:30	Kubicki 27', 69'; Churlinov 59'		Samper (red card) 41'	Stadium: Białystok Stadium; Attendance: 12,439; Referee: Damian Sylwestrzak

23 February 2025 22	Cracovia	2–2	Jagiellonia Białystok	Kraków
14:45	Bzdyl 73'; van Buren 85'		Churlinov 34'; Imaz 39'	Stadium: Józef Piłsudski Cracovia Stadium; Attendance: 11,482; Referee: Daniel Stefański

2 March 2025 23	Jagiellonia Białystok	1–0	GKS Katowice	Białystok
17:30	Romanczuk 36'			Stadium: Białystok Stadium; Attendance: 14,271; Referee: Wojciech Myć

9 March 2025 24	Widzew Łódź	0–1	Jagiellonia Białystok	Łódź
17:30			Skrzypczak 8'	Stadium: Widzew Łódź Stadium; Attendance: 16,768; Referee: Tomasz Kwiatkowski

16 March 2025 25	Jagiellonia Białystok	2–1	Lech Poznań	Białystok
20:15	Imaz 31'; Murawski 59' (o.g.)		Gholizadeh 9'	Stadium: Białystok Stadium; Attendance: 19,957; Referee: Daniel Stefański

29 March 2025 26	Lechia Gdańsk	1–0	Jagiellonia Białystok	Gdańsk
17:30	Vyunnyk 65'			Stadium: Polsat Plus Arena Gdańsk; Attendance: 13,125; Referee: Paweł Raczkowski

6 April 2025 27	Jagiellonia Białystok	1–1	Piast Gliwice	Białystok
12:15	Wojtuszek 22'		Gale 62'	Stadium: Białystok Stadium; Attendance: 17,440; Referee: Yusuke Araki (Japan)

13 April 2025 28	Legia Warsaw	0–1	Jagiellonia Białystok	Warsaw
20:15			Churlinov 41'; Stojinović (red card) 90+3'	Stadium: Stadion Wojska Polskiego; Referee: Damian Sylwestrzak

21 April 2025 29	Jagiellonia Białystok	1–3	Zagłębie Lubin	Białystok
14:45	Imaz 15'		Szmyt 29'; Pieńko 88' (pen.), 90+9'	Stadium: Białystok Stadium; Referee: Paweł Raczkowski

27 April 2025 30	Korona Kielce	3–1	Jagiellonia Białystok	Kielce
12:15	Shikavka 45+6'; Resta 49'; Fornalczyk 60'		Pululu 24' (pen.)	Stadium: Kielce Municipal Stadium; Attendance: 14,165; Referee: Tomasz Kwiatkowski

4 May 2025 31	Jagiellonia Białystok	1–1	Górnik Zabrze	Białystok
17:30	Pietuszewski 20'		Szcześniak 34'	Stadium: Białystok Stadium; Attendance: 19,070; Referee: Jarosław Przybył

10 May 2025 32	Raków Częstochowa	1–2	Jagiellonia Białystok	Częstochowa
20:15	Ivi 28'; Tudor (red card) 59'		Pululu 45+4' (pen.), 83' (pen.)	Stadium: Raków Municipal Stadium; Attendance: 5,500; Referee: Paweł Raczkowski

16 May 2025 33	Śląsk Wrocław	1–1	Jagiellonia Białystok	Wrocław
20:30	Matsenko 54'		Imaz 66'	Stadium: Tarczyński Arena; Attendance: 20,393; Referee: Karol Arys

24 May 2025 34	Jagiellonia Białystok	1–1	Pogoń Szczecin	Białystok
18:00	Wojtuszek 71'		Koulouris 32'	Stadium: Białystok Stadium; Referee: Wojciech Myć

=== Polish Cup ===
==== Matches ====
30 October 2024 Round of 32	Chojniczanka Chojnice	0–3	Jagiellonia Białystok	Chojnice
17:30 CET		Report	Hansen 23', 42'; Nguiamba 66'	Stadium: Chojniczanka 1930 Municipal Stadium; Attendance: 3,500; Referee: Paweł Raczkowski

5 December 2024 Round of 16	Olimpia Grudziądz	1–3	Jagiellonia Białystok	Grudziądz
13:00 CET	Kaczmarek 15' (pen.)		Nené 21'; Pululu 22'; Imaz 30'	Stadium: Bronisław Malinowski Stadium; Attendance: 5,323; Referee: Damian Kos

26 February 2025 Quarter-finals	Legia Warsaw	3–1	Jagiellonia Białystok	Warsaw
21:00 CET	Ziółkowski 53'; Morishita 85', 90+9'		Kubicki 30'	Stadium: Stadion Wojska Polskiego; Attendance: 23,816; Referee: Piotr Lasyk

=== Polish Super Cup ===
2 April 2025 Final	Jagiellonia Białystok	1–0	Wisła Kraków	Warsaw
21:00	Villar 14'			Stadium: Stadion Narodowy; Attendance: 10,953; Referee: Jarosław Przybył

=== UEFA Champions League ===
==== Second qualifying round ====
The draw was held on 19 June 2024.

23 July 2024 First leg	Panevėžys (Lithuania)	0–4	(Poland) Jagiellonia Białystok	Panevėžys, Lithuania
18:30 UTC+3	Gussiås (yellow card) 39'	Report	Imaz 15', 28', 29'; Normann Hansen 80'; Moutinho (yellow card) 82'	Stadium: Aukštaitija Stadium; Referee: Novak Simović (Serbia)

31 July 2024 Second leg	Jagiellonia Białystok (Poland)	3–1 (7–1 agg.)	(Lithuania) Panevėžys	Białystok
20:30 UTC+2	Pululu 12' (pen.), 69' (pen.); Beneta 84' (o.g.)	Report	Dubra (yellow card) 69'; Gussiås 87'	Stadium: Białystok Stadium; Referee: Vassilis Fotias (Greece)

==== Third qualifying round ====
7 August 2024 First leg	Jagiellonia Białystok (Poland)	0–1	(Norway) Bodø/Glimt	Białystok
20:45		Report	Diéguez 58' (o.g.)	Stadium: Białystok Stadium; Referee: Sven Jablonski (Germany)

13 August 2024 Second leg	Bodø/Glimt (Norway)	4–1 (5–1 agg.)	(Poland) Jagiellonia Białystok	Bodø, Norway
19:00		Report		Stadium: Aspmyra Stadion; Referee: Benoît Bastien (France)

=== UEFA Europa League ===
22 August 2024 First leg	Jagiellonia Białystok (Poland)	1–4	(Netherlands) Ajax	Białystok
20:45				Stadium: Białystok Stadium; Attendance: 19,553; Referee: Rade Obrenovič (Slovenia)

29 August 2024 Second leg	Ajax (Netherlands)	3–0 (7–1 agg.)	(Poland) Jagiellonia Białystok	Amsterdam, Netherlands
20:00				Stadium: Johan Cruyff Arena; Attendance: 54,010; Referee: Maurizio Mariani (Italy)

=== UEFA Conference League ===
==== League phase ====
Pos	Team	Pld	W	D	L	GF	GA	GD	Pts	Qualification
7	(Polish Football Association) Legia Warsaw	6	4	0	2	13	5	+8	12	Advance to round of 16 (seeded)
8	(Royal Belgian Football Association) Cercle Brugge	6	3	2	1	14	7	+7	11	Advance to round of 16 (seeded)
9	(Polish Football Association) Jagiellonia Białystok	6	3	2	1	10	5	+5	11	Advance to knockout phase play-offs (seeded)
10	(Football Association of Ireland) Shamrock Rovers	6	3	2	1	12	9	+3	11	Advance to knockout phase play-offs (seeded)
11	(Cyprus Football Association) APOEL	6	3	2	1	8	5	+3	11	Advance to knockout phase play-offs (seeded)

Source: UEFA
Rules for classification: League phase tiebreakers

3 October 2024 1	Copenhagen (Denmark)	1–2	(Poland) Jagiellonia Białystok	Copenhagen, Denmark
21:00 CEST	Hatzidiakos 12'	Report	Pululu 51'; Churlinov 90+8'	Stadium: Parken Stadion; Attendance: 22,393; Referee: Robert Harvey (Republic of Ireland)

24 October 2024 2	Jagiellonia Białystok (Poland)	2–0	(Moldova) Petrocub Hîncești	Białystok, Poland
18:45 CEST	Pululu 69', 72'	Report		Stadium: Białystok Stadium; Attendance: 14,021; Referee: Daniyar Sakhi (Kazakhstan)

7 November 2024 3	Jagiellonia Białystok (Poland)	3–0	(Norway) Molde	Białystok, Poland
21:00 CET	Pululu 6'; Hansen 60', 75'	Report		Stadium: Białystok Stadium; Attendance: 12,478; Referee: Miloš Milanović (Serbia)

28 November 2024 4	NK Celje (Slovenia)	3–3	(Poland) Jagiellonia Białystok	Celje, Slovenia
18:45 CET	Zec 7'; Nieto 54'; Diéguez 80' (o.g.)	Report	Pululu 34'; Imaz 71'; Hansen 78'	Stadium: Stadion Z'dežele; Referee: Allard Lindhout (Netherlands)

12 December 2024 5	Mladá Boleslav (Czech Republic)	1–0	(Poland) Jagiellonia Białystok	Mladá Boleslav, Czechia
18:45 CET	Vydra 76'	Report		Stadium: Lokotrans Aréna; Referee: David Dickinson (Scotland)

19 December 2024 6	Jagiellonia Białystok (Poland)	0–0	(Slovenia) Olimpija Ljubljana	Białystok, Poland
21:00 CET		Report		Stadium: Białystok Stadium; Attendance: 14,329; Referee: Luis Godinho (Portugal)

==== Knockout phase ====
===== Knockout phase play-offs =====
The draw for the knockout phase play-offs was held on 20 December 2024.

13 February 2025 First leg	TSC (Serbia)	1–3	(Poland) Jagiellonia Białystok	Bačka Topola, Serbia
21:00 CET	Mboungou 28'	Report	Imaz 31', 88'; Pululu 81'	Stadium: TSC Arena; Attendance: 2,550; Referee: António Nobre (Portugal)

20 February 2025 Second leg	Jagiellonia Białystok (Poland)	3–1 (6–2 agg.)	(Serbia) TSC	Białystok, Poland
21:00 CET	Hansen 8'; Imaz 70'; Radojević 76' (o.g.)	Report	Lazetić 17'	Stadium: Białystok Stadium; Attendance: 10,243; Referee: Allard Lindhout (Netherlands)

===== Round of 16 =====
The round of 16 draw was held on 21 February 2025.

6 March 2025 First leg	Jagiellonia Białystok (Poland)	3–0	(Belgium) Cercle Brugge	Białystok, Poland
21:00 CET	Pululu 69' (pen.), 78'; Romanczuk 75'	Report	Francis (red card) 59'	Stadium: Białystok Stadium; Attendance: 17,221; Referee: Anastasios Sidiropoulos (Greece)

13 March 2025 Second leg	Cercle Brugge (Belgium)	2–0 (2–3 agg.)	(Poland) Jagiellonia Białystok	Bruges, Belgium
18:45 CET	Van der Bruggen 8'; Augusto 50'	Report		Stadium: Jan Breydel Stadium; Attendance: 4,646; Referee: Morten Krogh (Denmark)

===== Quarter-finals =====
The draw for the order of the quarter-final legs was held on 21 February 2025, after the draw for the round of 16.

10 April 2025 First leg	Real Betis (Spain)	2–0	(Poland) Jagiellonia Białystok	Seville, Spain
21:00 CEST (UTC+2)	Isco (yellow card) 17'; Bakambu 24'; J. Rodríguez 45+2'	Report	Villar (yellow card) 17'; Romanczuk (yellow card) 90+2'	Stadium: Benito Villamarín; Attendance: 56,442; Referee: Anthony Taylor (England)

17 April 2025 Second leg	Jagiellonia Białystok (Poland)	1–1 (1–3 agg.)	(Spain) Real Betis	Białystok, Poland
18:45 CEST (UTC+2)	Imaz (yellow card) 44'; Churlinov 81', (yellow card) 82'; Silva (yellow card) 90+3'	Report	Antony (yellow card) 39'; Sabaly (yellow card) 65'; Bakambu 78'	Stadium: Białystok City Stadium; Attendance: 20,003; Referee: Clément Turpin (France)

== Statistics ==
=== Goalscorers ===
Rank	Pos.	Player	Ekstraklasa	Polish Cup	Super Cup	Champions League	Europa League	Conference League	Total
1	FW	(Spain) Jesús Imaz	16	1	0	3	0	4	24
2	FW	(Angola) Afimico Pululu	9	1	0	2	0	8	20
3	MF	(Norway) Kristoffer Normann Hansen	3	2	0	1	0	4	10
4	FW	(North Macedonia) Darko Churlinov	5	0	0	0	0	2	7
5	MF	(Poland) Jarosław Kubicki	5	1	0	0	0	0	6
6	MF	(Portugal) Nené	3	1	0	0	0	0	4
7	FW	(France) Lamine Diaby-Fadiga	3	0	0	0	0	0	3
7	MF	(Poland) Taras Romanczuk	2	0	0	0	0	1	3
7	MF	(Spain) Miki Villar	2	0	1	0	0	0	3
10	DF	(Poland) Mateusz Skrzypczak	2	0	0	0	0	0	2
Totals			57	6	1	6	2	19	91
