= Molde FK in European football =

- Club: Molde FK
- First entry: 1975–76 UEFA Cup
- Latest entry: 2024–25 UEFA Conference League

Titles
- Champions League: 0 (Best: Group stage)
- Europa League: 0 (Best: Round of 16)
- Cup Winners' Cup: 0 (Best: First round)

Molde FK is a Norwegian professional football club based in Molde Municipality in Møre og Romsdal. The club was founded as International in 1911. The club changed its name to Molde Fotballklubb in 1915. The team has participated in 20 seasons of Union of European Football Associations (UEFA) club competitions, including 5 seasons entering the Champions League (1 group stage), 12 seasons entering the UEFA Cup and Europa League (3 group stages), 3 seasons entering the Europa Conference League (1 group stage) and one season in the Cup Winners' Cup. Their first European game was the 1975–76 UEFA Cup 1st Round against Swedish side Öster on 17 September 1975. In 1999 Molde became the second Norwegian club to enter the UEFA Champions League. The club's best performance in the UEFA Cup or Europa League is reaching the Round of 16 of the 2020–21 Europa League, and the 2024–25 UEFA Conference League.

The club plays its home matches at Aker Stadion, an all-seater stadium in Molde. Molde's record attendance in a European match of 10,705 dates from the 1999–2000 UEFA Champions League match against Real Madrid on 3 November 1999. Molde's biggest win is 7–1 against Knattspyrnufélag Reykjavíkur in the 2018–19 UEFA Europa League qualification, while the biggest defeat is 0–6 against Öster in the 1975–76 UEFA Cup. Molde has played Legia Warsaw more than any other clubs with total of six fixtures. Molde has played eleven times against Belgian clubs, more than any other nation.

== Matches ==
The following is a complete list of matches played by Molde in UEFA tournaments. It includes the season, tournament, the stage, the opponent club and its country and the score, with Molde's score noted first. It is up to date as of 13 March 2025.

=== Key ===
- a.e.t. = Match determined after extra time
- (a) = Match determined by away goals rule
- (p) = Match determined by penalty shoot-out
- R32 = Round of 32
- R16 = Round of 16
- Group = Group stage
- PO = Play-off round
- KPO = Knockout play-offs
- 1R = First round
- 2R = Second round
- QR = Qualification round
- 1Q = First qualification round
- 2Q = Second qualification round
- 3Q = Third qualification round

=== List of matches ===
List of Molde FK matches in European football
Season	Competition	Round	Opponent	Home	Away	Aggregate	Leg
1975–76	UEFA Cup	1R	(Sweden) Östers IF	1–0	0–6	1–6	1st 2nd
1978–79	UEFA Cup	1R	(Soviet Union) Torpedo Moscow	3–3	0–4	3–7	1st 2nd
1988–89	UEFA Cup	1R	(Belgium) Waregem	0–0	1–5	1–5	1st 2nd
1995–96	UEFA Cup Winners' Cup	QR	(Belarus) Dinamo-93 Minsk	2–1	1–1	3–2	
1995–96	UEFA Cup Winners' Cup	1R	(France) Paris Saint-Germain	2–3	0–3	2–6	
1996–97	UEFA Cup	QR	(Georgia (country)) Dinamo Tbilisi	0–0	1–2	1–2	1st 2nd
1998–99	UEFA Cup	2Q	(Bulgaria) CSKA Sofia	0–0	0–2	0–2	1st 2nd
1999–00	UEFA Champions League	2Q	(Russia) CSKA Moscow	4–0	0–2	4–2	1st 2nd
1999–00	UEFA Champions League	3Q	(Spain) Mallorca	0–0	1–1	1–1 (a)	1st 2nd
1999–00	UEFA Champions League	Group E	(Portugal) Porto	0–1	1–3	4th	Home Away
1999–00	UEFA Champions League	Group E	(Spain) Real Madrid	0–1	1–4	4th	Home Away
1999–00	UEFA Champions League	Group E	(Greece) Olympiacos	3–2	1–3	4th	Home Away
2000–01	UEFA Cup	1R	(Spain) Rayo Vallecano	0–1	1–1	1–2	1st 2nd
2003–04	UEFA Cup	QR	(Faroe Islands) Klaksvík	2–0	4–0	6–0	1st 2nd
2003–04	UEFA Cup	1R	(Portugal) União de Leiria	3–1	0–1	3–2	1st 2nd
2003–04	UEFA Cup	2R	(Portugal) Benfica	0–2	1–3	1–5	1st 2nd
2006–07	UEFA Cup	2Q	(Latvia) Skonto	0–0	2–1	2–1	1st 2nd
2006–07	UEFA Cup	1R	(Scotland) Rangers	0–0	0–2	0–2	1st 2nd
2010–11	UEFA Europa League	2Q	(Latvia) Jelgava	1–0	1–2	2–2 (a)	1st 2nd
2010–11	UEFA Europa League	3Q	(Germany) VfB Stuttgart	2–3	2–2	4–5	1st 2nd
2012–13	UEFA Champions League	2Q	(Latvia) Ventspils	3–0	1–1	4–1	1st (Home) 2nd (Away)
2012–13	UEFA Champions League	3Q	(Switzerland) Basel	0–1	1–1	1–2	1st (Home) 2nd (Away)
2012–13	UEFA Europa League	PO	(Netherlands) Heerenveen	2–0	2–1	4–1	1st (Home) 2nd (Away)
2012–13	UEFA Europa League	Group E	(Denmark) Copenhagen	1–2	1–2	4th	Home Away
2012–13	UEFA Europa League	Group E	(Germany) VfB Stuttgart	2–0	1–0	4th	Home Away
2012–13	UEFA Europa League	Group E	(Romania) FCSB	1–2	0–2	4th	Home Away
2013–14	UEFA Champions League	2Q	(Republic of Ireland) Sligo Rovers	2–0	1–0	3–0	1st (Away) 2nd (Home)
2013–14	UEFA Champions League	3Q	(Poland) Legia Warsaw	1–1	0–0	1–1 (a)	1st (Home) 2nd (Away)
2013–14	UEFA Europa League	PO	(Russia) Rubin Kazan	0–2	0–3	0–5	1st (Home) 2nd (Away)
2014–15	UEFA Europa League	2Q	(Slovenia) Gorica	4–1	1–1	5–2	1st (Home) 2nd (Away)
2014–15	UEFA Europa League	3Q	(Ukraine) Zorya Luhansk	1–2	1–1	2–3	1st (Away) 2nd (Home)
2015–16	UEFA Champions League	2Q	(Armenia) Pyunik	5–0	0–1	5–1	1st (Home) 2nd (Away)
2015–16	UEFA Champions League	3Q	(Croatia) Dinamo Zagreb	3–3	1–1	4–4 (a)	1st (Away) 2nd (Home)
2015–16	UEFA Europa League	PO	(Belgium) Standard Liège	2–0	1–3	3–3 (a)	1st (Home) 2nd (Away)
2015–16	UEFA Europa League	Group A	(Turkey) Fenerbahçe	0–2	3–1	1st	Home Away
2015–16	UEFA Europa League	Group A	(Netherlands) Ajax	1–1	1–1	1st	Home Away
2015–16	UEFA Europa League	Group A	(Scotland) Celtic	3–1	2–1	1st	Home Away
2015–16	UEFA Europa League	R32	(Spain) Sevilla	1–0	0–3	1–3	1st (Away) 2nd (Home)
2018–19	UEFA Europa League	1Q	(Northern Ireland) Glenavon	5−1	1−2	6–3	1st (Away) 2nd (Home)
2018–19	UEFA Europa League	2Q	(Albania) Laçi	3−0	2−0	5–0	1st (Home) 2nd (Away)
2018–19	UEFA Europa League	3Q	(Scotland) Hibernian	3–0	0−0	3–0	1st (Away) 2nd (Home)
2018–19	UEFA Europa League	PO	(Russia) Zenit Saint Petersburg	2−1	1−3	3–4	1st (Away) 2nd (Home)
2019–20	UEFA Europa League	1Q	(Iceland) KR	7−1	0−0	7−1	1st (Home) 2nd (Away)
2019–20	UEFA Europa League	2Q	(Serbia) Čukarički	0−0	3−1	3−1	1st (Home) 2nd (Away)
2019–20	UEFA Europa League	3Q	(Greece) Aris	3–0	1–3 (a.e.t.)	4–3	1st (Home) 2nd (Away)
2019–20	UEFA Europa League	PO	(Serbia) Partizan	1–1	1–2	2–3	1st (Away) 2nd (Home)
2020–21	UEFA Champions League	1Q	(Finland) KuPS	5–0	—N/a	—N/a	(Home)
2020–21	UEFA Champions League	2Q	(Slovenia) Celje	—N/a	2–1	—N/a	(Away)
2020–21	UEFA Champions League	3Q	(Azerbaijan) Qarabağ	—N/a	0–0 (a.e.t.) (6–5 p)	—N/a	(Away)
2020–21	UEFA Champions League	PO	(Hungary) Ferencváros	3–3	0–0	3–3 (a)	1st (Home) 2nd (Away)
2020–21	UEFA Europa League	Group B	(England) Arsenal	0–3	1–4	2nd	1st (Away) 2nd (Home)
2020–21	UEFA Europa League	Group B	(Austria) Rapid Wien	1–0	2–2	2nd	1st (Home) 2nd (Away)
2020–21	UEFA Europa League	Group B	(Republic of Ireland) Dundalk	3–1	2–1	2nd	1st (Away) 2nd (Home)
2020–21	UEFA Europa League	R32	(Germany) 1899 Hoffenheim	3–3	2–0	5–3	1st (Home) 2nd (Away)
2020–21	UEFA Europa League	R16	(Spain) Granada	2–1	0–2	2–3	1st (Away) 2nd (Home)
2021–22	UEFA Europa Conference League	2Q	(Switzerland) Servette	3–0	0−2	3−2	
2021–22	UEFA Europa Conference League	3Q	(Turkey) Trabzonspor	1–1 (a.e.t.)	3–3	4–4 (3–4 p)	
2022–23	UEFA Europa Conference League	2Q	(Sweden) IF Elfsborg	4–1	2−1	6−2	
2022–23	UEFA Europa Conference League	3Q	(Hungary) Kisvárda	3–0	1–2	4–2	
2022–23	UEFA Europa Conference League	PO	(Austria) Wolfsberger AC	0–1	4–0	4–1	
2022–23	UEFA Europa Conference League	Group F	(Belgium) Gent	0–0	0–4	3rd	
2022–23	UEFA Europa Conference League	Group F	(Republic of Ireland) Shamrock Rovers	3–0	2–0	3rd	
2022–23	UEFA Europa Conference League	Group F	(Sweden) Djurgården	2–3	2–3	3rd	
2023–24	UEFA Champions League	2Q	(Finland) HJK Helsinki	2−0	0–1	2−1	1st (Away) 2nd (Home)
2023–24	UEFA Champions League	3Q	(Faroe Islands) Klaksvík	2–0 (a.e.t.)	1–2	3–2	1st (Away) 2nd (Home)
2023–24	UEFA Champions League	PO	(Turkey) Galatasaray	2–3	1–2	3–5	1st (Home)
2023–24	UEFA Europa League	Group H	(Germany) Bayer Leverkusen	1–2	1–5	3rd	
2023–24	UEFA Europa League	Group H	(Azerbaijan) Qarabağ	2−2	0–1	3rd	
2023–24	UEFA Europa League	Group H	(Sweden) BK Häcken	5–1	3–1	3rd	
2023–24	UEFA Europa Conference League	KPO	(Poland) Legia Warsaw	3–2	3–0	6–2	
2023–24	UEFA Europa Conference League	R16	(Belgium) Club Brugge	2–1	0–3	2–4	
2024–25	UEFA Europa League	2Q	(Denmark) Silkeborg	3–1	2–3	5–4	
2024–25	UEFA Europa League	3Q	(Belgium) Cercle Brugge	3–0	0–1	3–1	
2024–25	UEFA Europa League	PO	(Sweden) IF Elfsborg	0–1	1–0 (a.e.t.)	1–1 (2–4 p)	
2024–25	UEFA Conference League	League phase	(Northern Ireland) Larne	3–0	—N/a	23rd	
2024–25	UEFA Conference League	League phase	(Belgium) Gent	—N/a	1–2	23rd	
2024–25	UEFA Conference League	League phase	(Poland) Jagiellonia Białystok	—N/a	0–3	23rd	
2024–25	UEFA Conference League	League phase	(Cyprus) APOEL	0–1	—N/a	23rd	
2024–25	UEFA Conference League	League phase	(Finland) HJK	—N/a	2–2	23rd	
2024–25	UEFA Conference League	League phase	(Czech Republic) Mladá Boleslav	4–3	—N/a	23rd	
2024–25	UEFA Conference League	KPO	(Republic of Ireland) Shamrock Rovers	0–1	1–0 (a.e.t.)	1–1 (5–4 p)	
2024–25	UEFA Conference League	R16	(Poland) Legia Warsaw	3–2	0–2 (a.e.t.)	3–4	

== Overall record ==
=== By competition ===
The following is a list of the all-time statistics from Molde's games in the three UEFA tournaments the club has participated in, as well as the overall total. The list contains the tournament, the number of games played (Pld), won (W), drawn (D) and lost (L). The number of goals scored (GF), goals against (GA), goal difference (GD) and the percentage of matches won (Win%). The statistics include qualification matches.

As of 13 March 2025

Tournament	Pld	W	D	L	GF	GA	GD	Win%
Champions League	33	10	11	12	47	38	+9	30.30
Europa League / UEFA Cup	88	34	19	35	126	116	+10	38.64
UEFA Europa Conference League	30	14	4	12	52	43	+9	46.67
Cup Winners' Cup	4	1	1	2	5	8	−3	25.00
Total	144	54	34	56	215	189	+26	37.50

=== By country ===
As of 13 March 2025

Country	Pld	W	D	L	GF	GA	GD	Win%
Albania	2	2	0	0	5	0	+5	100.00
Armenia	2	1	0	1	5	1	+4	50.00
Austria	4	2	1	1	7	3	+4	50.00
Azerbaijan	3	0	2	1	2	3	−1	0.00
Belarus	2	1	1	0	3	2	+1	50.00
Belgium	11	3	2	6	10	19	−9	27.27
Bulgaria	2	0	1	1	0	2	−2	0.00
Croatia	2	0	2	0	4	4	+0	0.00
Cyprus	1	0	0	1	0	1	−1	0.00
Czech Republic	1	1	0	0	4	3	+1	100.00
Denmark	4	1	0	3	7	8	−1	25.00
England	2	0	0	2	1	7	−6	0.00
Faroe Islands	4	3	0	1	9	2	+7	75.00
Finland	4	2	1	1	9	3	+6	50.00
France	2	0	0	2	2	6	−4	0.00
Georgia	2	0	1	1	1	2	−1	0.00
Germany	8	3	2	3	14	15	−1	37.50
Greece	4	2	0	2	8	8	+0	50.00
Hungary	4	1	2	1	7	5	+2	25.00
Iceland	2	1	1	0	7	1	+6	50.00
Ireland	8	7	0	1	14	3	+11	87.50
Latvia	6	3	2	1	8	4	+4	50.00
Netherlands	4	2	2	0	6	3	+3	50.00
Northern Ireland	3	2	0	1	9	3	+6	66.67
Poland	7	3	2	2	10	10	+0	42.86
Portugal	6	1	0	5	5	11	−6	16.67
Romania	2	0	0	2	1	4	−3	0.00
Russia	6	2	0	4	7	11	−4	33.33
Scotland	6	3	2	1	8	4	+4	50.00
Serbia	4	1	2	1	5	4	+1	25.00
Soviet Union	2	0	1	1	3	7	−4	0.00
Slovenia	3	2	1	0	7	3	+4	66.67
Spain	10	2	3	5	6	14	−8	20.00
Sweden	10	6	0	4	20	17	+3	60.00
Switzerland	4	1	1	2	4	4	+0	25.00
Turkey	6	1	2	3	10	12	−2	16.67
Ukraine	2	0	1	1	2	3	−1	0.00
