= Sławomir Abramowicz =

Polish footballer (born 2004)

- Abramowicz with Jagiellonia Białystok in 2025

Personal information
- Date of birth: 9 June 2004 (age 22)
- Place of birth: Warsaw, Poland
- Height: 1.87 m (6 ft 1 1/2 in)
- Position: Goalkeeper

Team information
- Current team: Jagiellonia Białystok
- Number: 50

Youth career
- 2014–2016: Victoria Sulejówek
- 2017–2019: Escola Varsovia
- 2019–2020: Varsovia Warsaw

Senior career*
Years	Team	Apps	(Gls)
2020–2021	Polonia Warsaw	13	(0)
2021–2024	Jagiellonia Białystok II	44	(0)
2023–	Jagiellonia Białystok	76	(0)

International career^{‡}
2022	Poland U18	2	(0)
2024	Poland U20	1	(0)
2024–	Poland U21	4	(0)
2026–	Poland	1	(0)
- * Club domestic league appearances and goals as of 12:38, 10 November 2026 (UTC) ‡ National team caps and goals as of 23:23, 17 November 2026 (UTC)

Sławomir Abramowicz (born 9 June 2004) is a Polish professional footballer who plays as a goalkeeper for Ekstraklasa club Jagiellonia Białystok and the Poland national team.

== Career ==
=== Early career ===
Abramowicz started his youth career in Victoria Sulejówek, then he played in Escola Varsovia, Varsovia Warsaw and Polonia Warsaw.

=== Jagiellonia Białystok ===
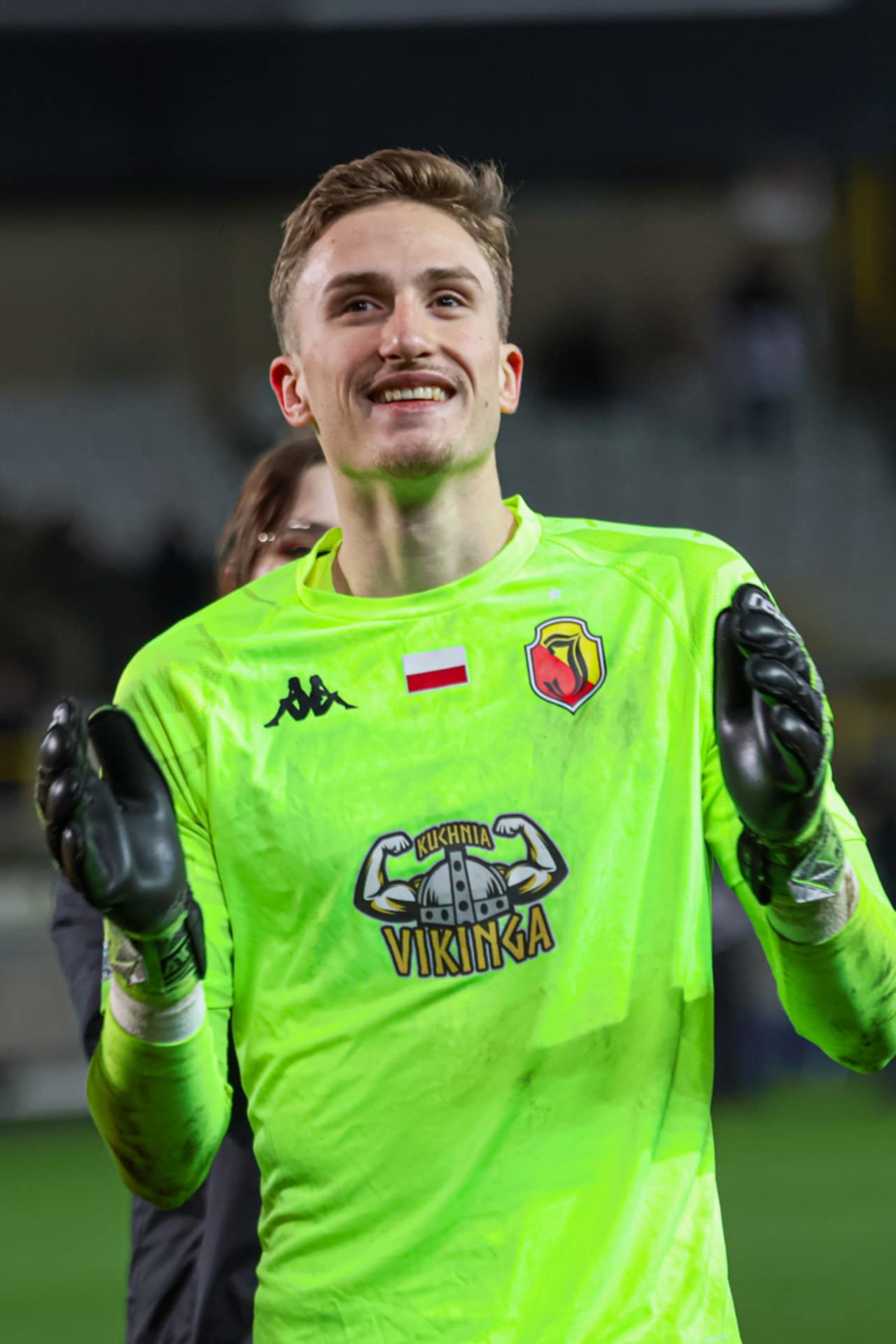
Abramowicz playing for Jagiellonia Białystok in 2025

In August 2021, he was transferred to Jagiellonia Białystok on a three-year deal, and was assigned shirt number 50. In 2023, his contract was extended until 2025.

Before his debut in a first team, Abramowicz played for Jagiellonia's reserve team. He made his debut with Jagiellonia's senior team in a 1–0 Polish Cup victory with Odra Opole on 2 September 2022. On 11 March 2023, Abramowicz made his Ekstraklasa debut in a 2–1 victory against Górnik Zabrze. He made 19 appearances in the 2022–23 season, three in the Ekstraklasa, two in the Polish Cup and 14 for Jagiellonia II.

Abramowicz was rewarded the Ekstraklasa Young Player of the Month award in November 2024. With him in the starting line-up, Jagiellonia eventually beat Wisła Kraków with 1–0 during the 2024 Polish Super Cup final.

== International career ==
Abramowicz is a Poland youth international footballer. He received his first call-up to the Poland national team on 22 September 2026, replacing the injured Bartłomiej Drągowski in the squad for the UEFA Nations League games against Bosnia and Herzegovina, Sweden and Romania. On 17 November 2026, Abramowicz made his senior international debut in a 1–1 draw against Sweden in the UEFA Nations League.

== Career statistics ==
As of match played 8 November 2026

Appearances and goals by club, season and competition
Club	Season	League			Polish Cup		Europe		Other		Total	
Club	Season	Division	Apps	Goals	Apps	Goals	Apps	Goals	Apps	Goals	Apps	Goals
Polonia Warsaw	2020–21	III liga, gr. I	13	0	—		—		—		13	0
Jagiellonia Białystok II	2021–22	III liga, gr. I	17	0	—		—		—		17	0
Jagiellonia Białystok II	2022–23	III liga, gr. I	14	0	—		—		—		14	0
Jagiellonia Białystok II	2023–24	III liga, gr. I	13	0	0	0	—		—		13	0
Jagiellonia Białystok II	Total		44	0	0	0	—		—		44	0
Jagiellonia Białystok	2022–23	Ekstraklasa	3	0	2	0	—		—		5	0
Jagiellonia Białystok	2023–24	Ekstraklasa	0	0	5	0	—		—		5	0
Jagiellonia Białystok	2024–25	Ekstraklasa	31	0	3	0	17 (Note: Four appearances in UEFA Champions League, one appearance in UEFA Europa League, twelve appearances in UEFA Conference League)	0	1 (Note: Appearance in Polish Super Cup)	0	52	0
Jagiellonia Białystok	2025–26	Ekstraklasa	30	0	0	0	12 (Note: Appearances in UEFA Conference League)	0	—		42	0
Jagiellonia Białystok	2026–27	Ekstraklasa	12	0	1	0	8 (Note: Appearances in UEFA Europa League)	0	—		21	0
Jagiellonia Białystok	Total		76	0	11	0	37	0	1	0	125	0
Career total			133	0	11	0	37	0	1	0	182	0

=== International ===
As of match played 17 November 2026

Appearances and goals by national team and year
National team	Year	Apps	Goals
Poland	2026	1	0
Total		1	0

== Honours ==
Jagiellonia Białystok

- Polish Super Cup: 2024

Individual

- Ekstraklasa Young Player of the Month: November 2024
