= Jakub Lewicki =

Polish footballer (born 2005)

Personal information
- Date of birth: 17 September 2005 (age 21)
- Place of birth: Białystok, Poland
- Height: 1.82 m (6 ft 0 in)
- Position: Left-back

Team information
- Current team: Piast Gliwice
- Number: 36

Youth career
- 2015–2019: MOSP Białystok
- 2019–2020: Jagiellonia Białystok
- 2020–2021: AP Jagiellonia Białystok

Senior career*
Years	Team	Apps	(Gls)
2021–2024	Jagiellonia Białystok II	20	(4)
2022–2024	Jagiellonia Białystok	39	(3)
2024–	Piast Gliwice	32	(0)

International career^{‡}
2021–2022	Poland U17	11	(2)
2022	Poland U18	3	(0)
2022–2023	Poland U19	12	(0)
2024–	Poland U20	7	(0)
2024–	Poland U21	1	(0)
- * Club domestic league appearances and goals as of 22:07, 29 May 2026 (UTC) ‡ National team caps and goals as of 19:36, 31 March 2026 (UTC)

Jakub Lewicki (born 17 September 2005) is a Polish professional footballer who plays as a left-back for Ekstraklasa club Piast Gliwice.

== Career ==
=== Youth career ===
During his youth career, he played in MOSP Białystok and Jagiellonia Białystok's youth team.

=== Jagiellonia Białystok ===
In 2022, he started playing for Jagiellonia's senior team. He was assigned squad number 36. He made his debut on 1 September 2022, in a 1–0 away win over Odra Opole in the Polish Cup, coming off the bench in 90th minute, replacing Bojan Nastić. He scored his first goal for Jagiellonia's first team in a 2–2 draw against Śląsk Wrocław on 23 October 2022. On 6 December 2022, it was announced that Lewicki had extended his contract to June 2025.

In the 2023–24 season, he made 20 league appearances as Jagiellonia won their first-ever Ekstraklasa title.

=== Piast Gliwice ===
On 7 September 2024, he moved to fellow top-flight club Piast Gliwice on a three-year deal.

== Career statistics ==
As of match played 23 May 2026

Appearances and goals by club, season and competition
Club	Season	League			Polish Cup		Europe		Other		Total	
Club	Season	Division	Apps	Goals	Apps	Goals	Apps	Goals	Apps	Goals	Apps	Goals
Jagiellonia Białystok II	2022–23	III liga, gr. I	5	1	—		—		—		5	1
Jagiellonia Białystok II	2023–24	III liga, gr. I	9	1	0	0	—		—		9	1
Jagiellonia Białystok II	2024–25	III liga, gr. I	6	2	—		—		—		6	2
Jagiellonia Białystok II	Total		20	4	0	0	—		—		20	4
Jagiellonia Białystok	2022–23	Ekstraklasa	19	1	2	0	—		—		21	1
Jagiellonia Białystok	2023–24	Ekstraklasa	20	2	2	0	—		—		22	2
Jagiellonia Białystok	2024–25	Ekstraklasa	0	0	—		1 (Note: Appearance in UEFA Champions League)	0	—		1	0
Jagiellonia Białystok	Total		39	3	4	0	1	0	—		44	3
Piast Gliwice	2024–25	Ekstraklasa	6	0	3	0	—		—		9	0
Piast Gliwice	2025–26	Ekstraklasa	26	0	3	0	—		—		29	0
Piast Gliwice	Total		32	0	6	0	—		—		38	0
Career total			91	7	10	0	1	0	0	0	102	7

== Honours ==
Jagiellonia Białystok

- Ekstraklasa: 2023–24
