= Real Betis in European football =

Spanish club in European football

- Club: Real Betis
- Seasons played: 15
- First entry: 1977–78 European Cup Winners' Cup
- Latest entry: 2026–27 UEFA Champions League

This is an article showing the matches of Real Betis in European competitions.

== Overall record ==
Accurate as of 21 October 2026

Competition	Played	Won	Drew	Lost	GF	GA	GD	Win%
UEFA Champions League	11	6	2	3	13	13	+0	54.55
UEFA Cup Winners' Cup	12	5	3	4	15	13	+2	41.67
UEFA Cup / UEFA Europa League	82	42	17	23	122	84	+38	51.22
UEFA Europa Conference League / UEFA Conference League	19	9	5	5	29	18	+11	47.37
Total	124	62	27	35	179	128	+51	50.00

Source: UEFA.com
Pld = Matches played; W = Matches won; D = Matches drawn; L = Matches lost; GF = Goals for; GA = Goals against; GD = Goal difference.

== Results ==
Season	Competition	Round	Opponent	Home	Away	Aggregate
1977–78	UEFA Cup Winners' Cup	First round	(Italy) Milan	2–0	1–2	3–2
1977–78	UEFA Cup Winners' Cup	Second round	(East Germany) Lokomotive Leipzig	2–1	1–1	3–2
1977–78	UEFA Cup Winners' Cup	Quarter-finals	(Soviet Union) Dynamo Moscow	0–0	0–3	0–3
1982–83	UEFA Cup	First round	(Portugal) Benfica	1–2	1–2	2–4
1984–85	UEFA Cup	First round	(Romania) Universitatea Craiova	1–0	0–1 (a.e.t.)	1–1 (3–5 p)
1995–96	UEFA Cup	First round	(Turkey) Fenerbahçe	2–0	2–1	4–1
1995–96	UEFA Cup	Second round	(Germany) 1. FC Kaiserslautern	1–0	3–1	4–1
1995–96	UEFA Cup	Third round	(France) Bordeaux	2–1	0–2	2–3
1997–98	UEFA Cup Winners' Cup	First round	(Hungary) Budapesti VSC	2–0	2–0	4–0
1997–98	UEFA Cup Winners' Cup	Second round	(Denmark) Copenhagen	2–0	1–1	3–1
1997–98	UEFA Cup Winners' Cup	Quarter-finals	(England) Chelsea	1–2	1–3	2–5
1998–99	UEFA Cup	First round	(Denmark) Vejle	5–0	0–1	5–1
1998–99	UEFA Cup	Second round	(Netherlands) Willem II	3–0	1–1	4–1
1998–99	UEFA Cup	Third round	(Italy) Bologna	1–0	1–4	2–4
2002–03	UEFA Cup	First round	(Moldova) Zimbru Chișinău	2–1	2–0	4–1
2002–03	UEFA Cup	Second round	(Czech Republic) Viktoria Žižkov	3–0	1–0	4–0
2002–03	UEFA Cup	Third round	(France) Auxerre	1–0	0–2	1–2
2005–06	UEFA Champions League	Third qualifying round	(France) Monaco	1–0	2–2	3–2
2005–06	UEFA Champions League	Group stage	(England) Liverpool	1–2	0–0	3rd
2005–06	UEFA Champions League	Group stage	(Belgium) Anderlecht	0–1	1–0	3rd
2005–06	UEFA Champions League	Group stage	(England) Chelsea	1–0	0–4	3rd
2005–06	UEFA Cup	Round of 32	(Netherlands) AZ	2–0	1–2 (a.e.t.)	3–2
2005–06	UEFA Cup	Round of 16	(Romania) Steaua București	0–3	0–0	0–3
2013–14	UEFA Europa League	Play-off round	(Czech Republic) Jablonec	6–0	2–1	8–1
2013–14	UEFA Europa League	Group stage	(France) Lyon	0–0	0–1	2nd
2013–14	UEFA Europa League	Group stage	(Portugal) Vitória de Guimarães	1–0	1–0	2nd
2013–14	UEFA Europa League	Group stage	(Croatia) Rijeka	0–0	1–1	2nd
2013–14	UEFA Europa League	Round of 32	(Russia) Rubin Kazan	1–1	2–0	3–1
2013–14	UEFA Europa League	Round of 16	(Spain) Sevilla	0–2	2–0 (a.e.t.)	2–2 (3–4 p)
2018–19	UEFA Europa League	Group stage	(Greece) Olympiacos	1–0	0–0	1st
2018–19	UEFA Europa League	Group stage	(Luxembourg) F91 Dudelange	3–0	0–0	1st
2018–19	UEFA Europa League	Group stage	(Italy) Milan	1–1	2–1	1st
2018–19	UEFA Europa League	Round of 32	(France) Rennes	1–3	3–3	4–6
2021–22	UEFA Europa League	Group stage	(Germany) Bayer Leverkusen	1–1	0–4	2nd
2021–22	UEFA Europa League	Group stage	(Scotland) Celtic	4–3	2–3	2nd
2021–22	UEFA Europa League	Group stage	(Hungary) Ferencváros	2–0	3–1	2nd
2021–22	UEFA Europa League	Knockout round play-offs	(Russia) Zenit Saint Petersburg	0–0	3–2	3–2
2021–22	UEFA Europa League	Round of 16	(Germany) Eintracht Frankfurt	1–2	1–1 (a.e.t.)	2–3
2022–23	UEFA Europa League	Group stage	(Finland) HJK	3–0	2–0	1st
2022–23	UEFA Europa League	Group stage	(Bulgaria) Ludogorets Razgrad	3–2	1–0	1st
2022–23	UEFA Europa League	Group stage	(Italy) Roma	1–1	2–1	1st
2022–23	UEFA Europa League	Round of 16	(England) Manchester United	0–1	1–4	1–5
2023–24	UEFA Europa League	Group stage	(Scotland) Rangers	2–3	0–1	3rd
2023–24	UEFA Europa League	Group stage	(Czech Republic) Sparta Prague	2–1	0–1	3rd
2023–24	UEFA Europa League	Group stage	(Cyprus) Aris Limassol	4–1	1–0	3rd
2023–24	UEFA Europa Conference League	Knockout round play-offs	(Croatia) Dinamo Zagreb	0–1	1–1	1–2
2024–25	UEFA Conference League	Play-off round	(Ukraine) Kryvbas Kryvyi Rih	3–0	2–0	5–0
2024–25	UEFA Conference League	League phase	(Poland) Legia Warsaw	—N/a	0–1	15th
2024–25	UEFA Conference League	League phase	(Denmark) Copenhagen	1–1	—N/a	15th
2024–25	UEFA Conference League	League phase	(Slovenia) Celje	2–1	—N/a	15th
2024–25	UEFA Conference League	League phase	(Czech Republic) Mladá Boleslav	—N/a	1–2	15th
2024–25	UEFA Conference League	League phase	(Moldova) Petrocub Hîncești	—N/a	1–0	15th
2024–25	UEFA Conference League	League phase	(Finland) HJK	1–0	—N/a	15th
2024–25	UEFA Conference League	Knockout phase play-offs	(Belgium) Gent	0–1	3–0	3–1
2024–25	UEFA Conference League	Round of 16	(Portugal) Vitória de Guimarães	2–2	4–0	6–2
2024–25	UEFA Conference League	Quarter-finals	(Poland) Jagiellonia Białystok	2–0	1–1	3–1
2024–25	UEFA Conference League	Semi-finals	(Italy) Fiorentina	2–1	2–2 (a.e.t.)	4–3
2024–25	UEFA Conference League	Final	(England) Chelsea	1–4 (N)		
2025–26	UEFA Europa League	League phase	(England) Nottingham Forest	2–2	—N/a	4th
2025–26	UEFA Europa League	League phase	(Bulgaria) Ludogorets Razgrad	—N/a	2–0	4th
2025–26	UEFA Europa League	League phase	(Belgium) Genk	—N/a	0–0	4th
2025–26	UEFA Europa League	League phase	(France) Lyon	2–0	—N/a	4th
2025–26	UEFA Europa League	League phase	(Netherlands) Utrecht	2–1	—N/a	4th
2025–26	UEFA Europa League	League phase	(Croatia) Dinamo Zagreb	—N/a	3–1	4th
2025–26	UEFA Europa League	League phase	(Greece) PAOK	—N/a	0–2	4th
2025–26	UEFA Europa League	League phase	(Netherlands) Feyenoord	2–1	—N/a	4th
2025–26	UEFA Europa League	Round of 16	(Greece) Panathinaikos	4–0	0–1	4–1
2025–26	UEFA Europa League	Quarter-finals	(Portugal) Braga	2–4	1–1	3–5
2026–27	UEFA Champions League	League phase	(France) Lille	—N/a	3–2	
2026–27	UEFA Champions League	League phase	(Portugal) Porto	3–2	—N/a	
2026–27	UEFA Champions League	League phase	(Netherlands) Feyenoord	1–0	—N/a	
2026–27	UEFA Champions League	League phase	(Germany) Borussia Dortmund	—N/a		
2026–27	UEFA Champions League	League phase	(Slovakia) Slovan Bratislava	—N/a		
2026–27	UEFA Champions League	League phase	(Italy) Como		—N/a	
2026–27	UEFA Champions League	League phase	(England) Arsenal		—N/a	
2026–27	UEFA Champions League	League phase	(Germany) Bayern Munich	—N/a		
