= Mateusz Skrzypczak =

Polish footballer

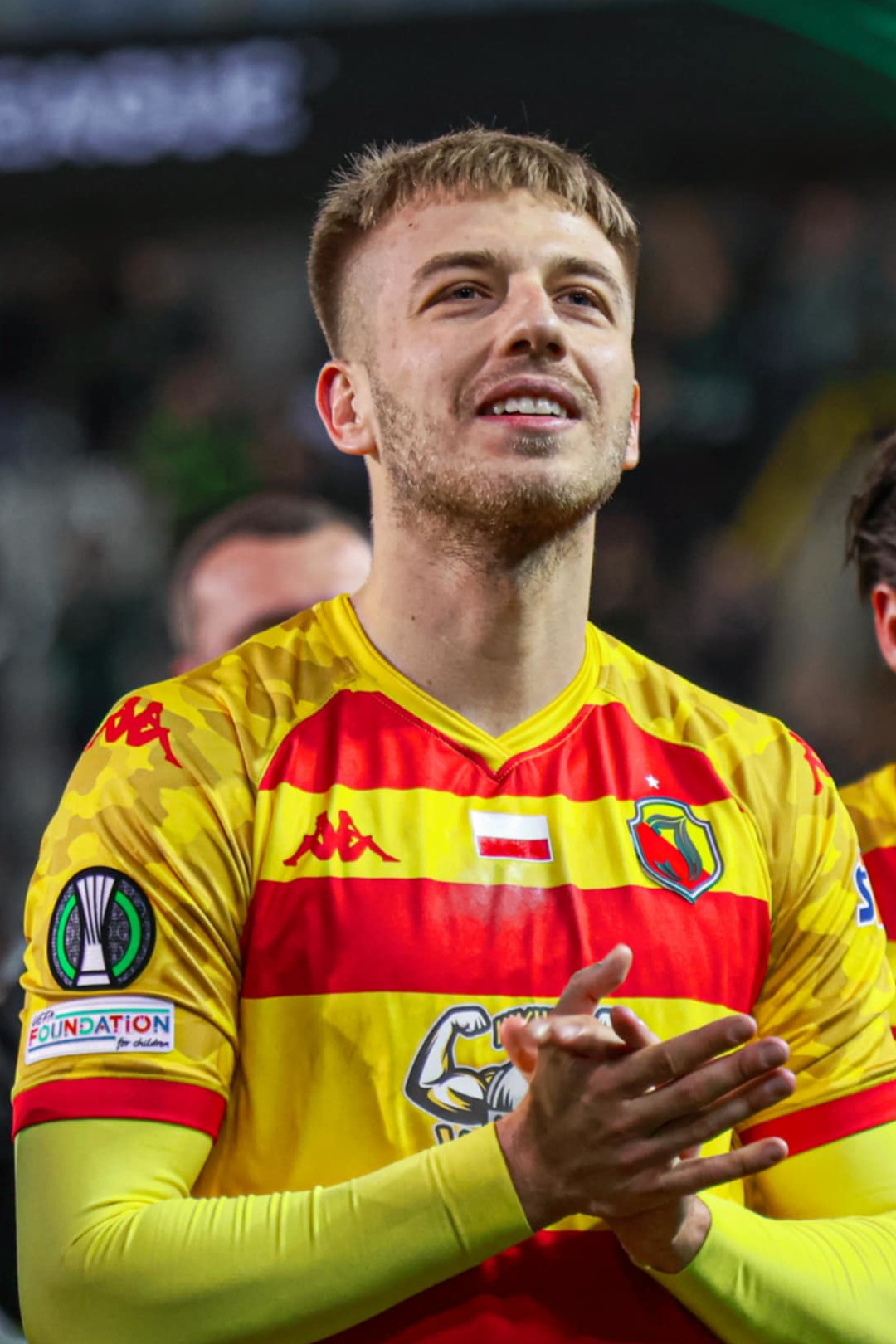
- Skrzypczak with Jagiellonia Białystok in 2025

Personal information
- Date of birth: 22 August 2000 (age 26)
- Place of birth: Poznań, Poland
- Height: 1.86 m (6 ft 1 in)
- Positions: Centre-back; defensive midfielder

Team information
- Current team: Lech Poznań
- Number: 72

Youth career
- –2017: Lech Poznań

Senior career*
Years	Team	Apps	(Gls)
2017–2022	Lech Poznań II	51	(1)
2019–2022	Lech Poznań	7	(0)
2020–2021	→ Puszcza Niepołomice (loan)	13	(0)
2021	→ Stomil Olsztyn (loan)	14	(0)
2022–2025	Jagiellonia Białystok	82	(6)
2023	Jagiellonia Białystok II	1	(0)
2025–	Lech Poznań	32	(1)

International career^{‡}
2014–2015	Poland U15	4	(0)
2015–2016	Poland U16	9	(1)
2016	Poland U17	1	(1)
2017	Poland U18	2	(0)
2019	Poland U20	1	(0)
2025–	Poland	2	(0)
- * Club domestic league appearances and goals as of 11:00, 16 November 2026 (UTC) ‡ National team caps and goals as of 2:13, 11 June 2025 (UTC)

Mateusz Skrzypczak (born 22 August 2000) is a Polish professional footballer who plays as a centre-back or a defensive midfielder for Ekstraklasa club Lech Poznań and the Poland national team.

== Club career ==
=== Youth career ===
Skrzypczak started his career with Lech Poznań.

=== Lech Poznań ===
Following his youth career, he made his first appearance for Lech Poznań II in a 3–0 away loss with Centra Ostrów Wielkopolski on 21 October 2017. During that match, he came off the bench in the 77th minute, replacing Jakub Moder. Skrzypczak scored the first goal for Lech's second team in the next season on 9 March 2019 in a 4–0 home victory over Bałtyk Koszalin.

==== Loan to Puszcza Niepołomice ====
On 4 August 2020, he joined I liga club Puszcza Niepołomice on a season-long loan. He made his debut ten days later in a 1–4 away Polish Cup victory over Jaguar Gdańsk.

==== Loan to Stomil Olsztyn ====
On 14 January 2021, his loan to the I liga side Stomil Olsztyn was announced. He debuted in Stomil in a 2–1 away loss to GKS Tychy on 27 February 2021. In the 17th minute of his second match, a 1–2 away victory over Odra Opole played on 5 March, he was removed from the pitch.

=== Jagiellonia Białystok ===
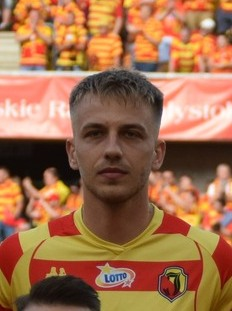
Skrzypczak lining up for Jagiellonia Białystok in 2024

On 23 May 2022, Skrzypczak signed a two-year contract with another Ekstraklasa side Jagiellonia Białystok, with an option for another year which was exercised in January 2024. He was assigned with squad number 72. He debuted in his new team on 16 July 2022, in a 2–0 victory over Piast Gliwice. On 6 August, in the 44th minute of a 1–2 loss over Radomiak Radom, he was given a red card.

Skrzypczak scored his first goal for Jagiellonia over three months later, on 12 November 2023, during a 2–1 home victory over his former club, Lech Poznań. It was his sole goal throughout the 2022–23 season. In the 2023–24 season, he won his second Ekstraklasa title, as Jagiellonia were crowned champions for the first time in the club's history.

On 19 November 2024, he extended his contract with Jagiellonia until the end of the 2026–27 season, with an option for a further year. After the conclusion of the 2024–25 season, Skrzypczak was named the Ekstraklasa Defender of the Season.

=== Return to Lech ===
On 19 June 2025, Lech Poznań announced the signing of Skrzypczak on a four-year deal, after triggering his €900,000 release clause.

== International career ==
A former youth international for Poland, Skrzypczak received his first senior team call-up for the UEFA Nations League matches against Portugal and Croatia to be played in October 2024, but missed both due to an injury. He made his debut for Poland on 6 June 2025, playing the full length of a 2–0 friendly win over Moldova.

== Career statistics ==
=== Club ===
As of match played 8 November 2026

Appearances and goals by club, season and competition
Club	Season	League			Polish Cup		Europe		Other		Total	
Club	Season	Division	Apps	Goals	Apps	Goals	Apps	Goals	Apps	Goals	Apps	Goals
Lech Poznań II	2017–18	III liga, gr. II	4	0	—		—		—		4	0
Lech Poznań II	2018–19	III liga, gr. II	20	1	—		—		—		20	1
Lech Poznań II	2019–20	II liga	16	0	—		—		—		16	0
Lech Poznań II	2021–22	II liga	11	0	0	0	—		—		11	0
Lech Poznań II	Total		51	1	0	0	—		—		51	1
Lech Poznań	2018–19	Ekstraklasa	3	0	0	0	0	0	—		3	0
Lech Poznań	2019–20	Ekstraklasa	2	0	2	1	—		—		4	1
Lech Poznań	2021–22	Ekstraklasa	2	0	5	0	—		—		7	0
Lech Poznań	Total		7	0	7	1	0	0	—		14	1
Puszcza Niepołomice (loan)	2020–21	I liga	13	0	2	0	—		—		15	0
Stomil Olsztyn (loan)	2020–21	I liga	14	0	—		—		—		14	0
Jagiellonia Białystok	2022–23	Ekstraklasa	26	1	0	0	—		—		26	1
Jagiellonia Białystok	2023–24	Ekstraklasa	28	3	3	0	—		—		31	3
Jagiellonia Białystok	2024–25	Ekstraklasa	28	2	2	0	15 (Note: Four appearances in UEFA Champions League, two appearances in UEFA Europa League, nine appearances in UEFA Conference League)	0	1 (Note: Appearance in Polish Super Cup)	0	46	2
Jagiellonia Białystok	Total		82	6	5	0	15	0	1	0	103	6
Jagiellonia Białystok II	2023–24	III liga, gr. I	1	0	—		—		—		1	0
Lech Poznań	2025–26	Ekstraklasa	21	1	3	0	14 (Note: Four appearances in UEFA Champions League, two appearances in UEFA Europa League, eight appearances in UEFA Conference League)	0	1	0	39	1
Lech Poznań	2026–27	Ekstraklasa	11	0	1	0	6 (Note: Appearances in UEFA Europa League)	1	0	0	18	1
Lech Poznań	Total		32	1	4	0	20	1	1	0	57	2
Career total			200	8	18	1	35	1	2	0	255	10

=== International ===
As of match played 10 June 2025

Appearances and goals by national team and year
National team	Year	Apps	Goals
Poland
Poland	2025	2	0
Total		2	0

== Honours ==
Lech Poznań II

- III liga, group II: 2018–19

Lech Poznań

- Ekstraklasa: 2021–22, 2025–26

Jagiellonia Białystok

- Ekstraklasa: 2023–24
- Polish Super Cup: 2024

Individual

- Ekstraklasa Defender of the Season: 2024–25
- Polish Union of Footballers' Ekstraklasa Team of the Season: 2023–24
