= Jesús Imaz =

Spanish footballer (born 1990)

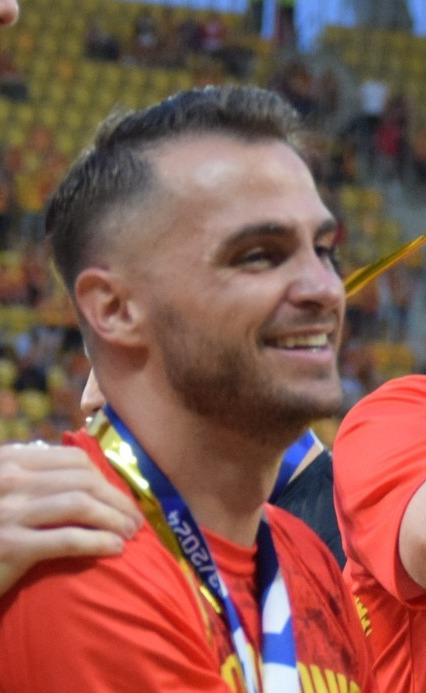
- Imaz with Jagiellonia Białystok in 2024

Personal information
- Full name: Jesús Imaz Ballesté
- Date of birth: 26 September 1990 (age 36)
- Place of birth: Lleida, Spain
- Height: 1.74 m (5 ft 8 1/2 in)
- Position: Forward

Team information
- Current team: Jagiellonia Białystok
- Number: 11

Youth career
- Lleida

Senior career*
Years	Team	Apps	(Gls)
2009–2011	Lleida	27	(4)
2011–2014	Lleida Esportiu	87	(21)
2014–2016	Llagostera	61	(12)
2016–2017	UCAM Murcia	14	(5)
2017	Cádiz	6	(1)
2017–2019	Wisła Kraków	47	(14)
2019–	Jagiellonia Białystok	233	(100)
- * Club domestic league appearances and goals as of 01:50, 1 November 2026 (UTC)

Jesús Imaz Ballesté (born 26 September 1990) is a Spanish professional footballer who plays as a forward for Ekstraklasa club Jagiellonia Białystok.

He spent the better of his Spanish career in the lower leagues, representing Llagostera, UCAM Murcia and Cádiz in the Segunda División and totalling 81 matches and 18 goals over three seasons. He moved to the Polish Ekstraklasa with Wisła Kraków in 2017, signing for Jagiellonia Białystok two years later and being an integral part of the club's first league title in 2023–24. In August 2025, he became the second foreign player to score 100 goals in the competition, and the all-time leader in that department in April 2026.

== Club career ==
=== Spain ===
Born in Lleida, Catalonia, Imaz was a UE Lleida youth graduate. He made his senior debut on 30 August 2009, as a second-half substitute in a 1–1 home draw against Sant Andreu in the Segunda División B.

In the summer of 2011, after Lleida's dissolution, Imaz joined newly formed Lleida Esportiu also in the third division. He was first choice in the following seasons, as the club missed out on promotion twice in the play-offs.

On 12 July 2014, Imaz signed a two-year deal with Llagostera, recently promoted to Segunda División. He played his first match as a professional on 23 August, replacing Vallho in the 78th minute of a 2–0 away loss to Las Palmas.

Imaz scored his first second-tier goal on 19 October 2014, but in a 1–4 home defeat against Mallorca. On 11 July 2016, having suffered relegation, he agreed to a one-year contract at UCAM Murcia in the same league.

On 27 January 2017, Imaz moved to fellow second division side Cádiz, signing until June 2018.

=== Poland ===
On 31 August 2017, Imaz joined a host of compatriots at Polish club Wisła Kraków. He remained in the Ekstraklasa in January 2019, signing a three-and-a-half-year deal with Jagiellonia Białystok.

During the 2022–23 season, Imaz netted a career-best 14 times but his team narrowly avoided relegation. With 12 goals in the following campaign, he was Jagiellonia's joint-top scorer as they won the first league title in their 104-year history.

Imaz's team reached the quarter-finals of the 2024–25 UEFA Conference League. He contributed four goals from 12 appearances to this achievement, notably in the 3–3 away draw against Celje in the league phase to have his effort voted the round's best.

On 17 August 2025, Imaz was the second foreigner in the history of the Polish top flight to reach the 100-goal milestone, after scoring his 99th and 100th in a 2–1 win over Radomiak Radom. On 14 March 2026, he scored Jagiellonia's sole goal in a 1–2 home loss to Piast Gliwice; his 108th strike in the competition, he equalled the record held by Flávio Paixão for the most goals ever by an expat. He became the all-time leader on 20 April, netting twice in the 3–0 victory against Arka Gdynia.

Imaz opened the scoring in a 3–1 defeat of Wieczysta Kraków on 31 October 2026, for his 100th league goal for Jagiellonia.

== Career statistics ==
As of match played 1 November 2026

Appearances and goals by club, season and competition
Club	Season	League			National cup (Note: Includes Copa del Rey, Polish Cup)		Continental		Other		Total	
Club	Season	Division	Apps	Goals	Apps	Goals	Apps	Goals	Apps	Goals	Apps	Goals
Lleida	2009–10	Segunda División B	1	0	0	0	—		—		1	0
Lleida	2010–11	Segunda División B	26	4	0	0	—		—		26	4
Lleida	Total		27	4	0	0	—		—		27	4
Lleida Esportiu	2011–12	Segunda División B	34	6	1	0	—		—		35	6
Lleida Esportiu	2012–13	Segunda División B	32	7	1	0	—		4 (Note: Appearances in Segunda División B play-offs)	1	37	8
Lleida Esportiu	2013–14	Segunda División B	21	8	3	3	—		2	0	26	11
Lleida Esportiu	Total		87	21	5	3	—		6	1	98	25
Llagostera	2014–15	Segunda División	29	6	0	0	—		—		29	6
Llagostera	2015–16	Segunda División	32	6	3	0	—		—		35	6
Llagostera	Total		61	12	3	0	—		—		64	12
UCAM Murcia	2016–17	Segunda División	14	5	2	1	—		—		16	6
Cádiz	2016–17	Segunda División	6	1	0	0	—		0	0	6	1
Cádiz	2017–18	Segunda División	0	0	0	0	—		—		0	0
Cádiz	Total		6	1	0	0	—		0	0	6	1
Wisła Kraków	2017–18	Ekstraklasa	30	8	1	0	—		—		31	8
Wisła Kraków	2018–19	Ekstraklasa	17	6	1	0	—		—		18	6
Wisła Kraków	Total		47	14	2	0	—		—		49	14
Jagiellonia Białystok	2018–19	Ekstraklasa	14	10	2	0	—		—		16	10
Jagiellonia Białystok	2019–20	Ekstraklasa	35	11	1	0	—		—		36	11
Jagiellonia Białystok	2020–21	Ekstraklasa	27	11	1	0	—		—		28	11
Jagiellonia Białystok	2021–22	Ekstraklasa	16	9	1	0	—		—		17	9
Jagiellonia Białystok	2022–23	Ekstraklasa	33	14	2	0	—		—		35	14
Jagiellonia Białystok	2023–24	Ekstraklasa	30	12	5	2	—		—		35	14
Jagiellonia Białystok	2024–25	Ekstraklasa	34	16	3	1	18 (Note: Four appearances and three goals in UEFA Champions League, two appearances in UEFA Europa League, twelve appearances and four goals in UEFA Conference League)	7	1 (Note: Appearance in Polish Super Cup)	0	56	24
Jagiellonia Białystok	2025–26	Ekstraklasa	33	13	2	0	13 (Note: Appearances in UEFA Conference League)	6	—		48	19
Jagiellonia Białystok	2026–27	Ekstraklasa	11	4	1	1	7 (Note: Appearances in UEFA Europa League)	2	—		19	7
Jagiellonia Białystok	Total		233	100	18	4	38	15	1	0	290	119
Career total			475	157	30	8	38	15	7	1	550	181

== Honours ==
Jagiellonia Białystok

- Ekstraklasa: 2023–24
- Polish Super Cup: 2024

Individual

- Piłka Nożna Foreigner of the Year: 2024
- Ekstraklasa Goal of the Season: 2020–21
- Ekstraklasa Player of the Month: October 2018, August 2019, September 2022, October 2024, August 2025, September 2025
