= Aurélien Nguiamba =

French footballer (born 1999)

Personal information
- Date of birth: 18 January 1999 (age 27)
- Place of birth: Colmar, France
- Height: 1.79 m (5 ft 10 in)
- Position: Midfielder

Youth career
- 2006–2014: Colmar
- 2014–2018: Nancy

Senior career*
Years	Team	Apps	(Gls)
2016–2020	Nancy II	39	(0)
2018–2021	Nancy	33	(0)
2020	→ Gazélec Ajaccio (loan)	8	(2)
2021–2023	Spezia	3	(0)
2023	→ Jagiellonia Białystok (loan)	11	(0)
2023–2025	Jagiellonia Białystok	30	(1)
2023–2024	Jagiellonia Białystok II	5	(0)
2025–2026	Arka Gdynia	28	(0)

International career
2014–2015	France U16	12	(3)
2015–2016	France U17	9	(1)
2016–2017	France U18	6	(0)
2017–2018	France U19	8	(0)
- * Club domestic league appearances and goals as of 17:37, 25 May 2026 (UTC)

Aurélien Nguiamba (born 18 January 1999) is a French professional footballer who plays as a midfielder.

== Club career ==
After being scouted in Colmar, Nguiamba joined the AS Nancy Lorraine youth academy in 2014. He made his professional debut for Nancy in a 3–0 Ligue 1 loss to Le Havre on 24 April 2018.

On 1 September 2023, his contract with Spezia was terminated by mutual consent. Shortly after, on 11 September, he re-joined Polish club Jagiellonia Białystok on a two-year deal, having previously played there on loan in the second half of the 2022–23 season. On 10 January 2025, he and Jagiellonia mutually agreed to part ways.

On 24 June 2025, Nguiamba agreed to join another Polish side Arka Gdynia on a two-year contract. At the end of the 2025–26 Ekstraklasa season, where Arka were relegated after just one season in the top flight, the club announced that Nguiamba would leave Arka in the summer.

== International career ==
Nguiamba was born in France to a Cameroonian father who is a literature professor in France. He was a youth international for France and represented France at the 2017 UEFA European Under-17 Championship.

== Honours ==
Jagiellonia Białystok

- Ekstraklasa: 2023–24
