= 2024–25 UEFA Conference League knockout phase =

Europe premier club football tournament

The 2024–25 UEFA Conference League knockout phase began on 13 February with the knockout phase play-offs and ended on 28 May 2025 with the final at the Wrocław Stadium in Wrocław, Poland, to decide the champions of the 2024–25 UEFA Conference League. A total of 24 teams competed in the knockout phase, with 16 entering in the play-offs and 8 receiving a bye to the round of 16.

Times are CET/CEST, (Note: CET (UTC+1) for dates up to 29 March 2025 (knockout phase play-offs and round of 16), and CEST (UTC+2) for dates thereafter (quarter-finals, semi-finals and final).) as listed by UEFA (local times, if different, are in parentheses).

== Qualified teams ==
The knockout phase involved the top 24 teams that qualified from the league phase. The top 8 teams received a bye to the round of 16, while teams finishing in positions 9 to 24 entered the knockout phase play-offs.

Entering the round of 16 (seeded)
Pos	Team
1	(England) Chelsea
2	(Portugal) Vitória de Guimarães
3	(Italy) Fiorentina
4	(Austria) Rapid Wien
5	(Sweden) Djurgårdens IF
6	(Switzerland) Lugano
7	(Poland) Legia Warsaw
8	(Belgium) Cercle Brugge

Entering the play-offs (seeded)
Pos	Team
9	(Poland) Jagiellonia Białystok
10	(Republic of Ireland) Shamrock Rovers
11	(Cyprus) APOEL
12	(Cyprus) Pafos
13	(Greece) Panathinaikos
14	(Slovenia) Olimpija Ljubljana
15	(Spain) Real Betis
16	(Germany) 1. FC Heidenheim

Entering the play-offs (unseeded)
Pos	Team
17	(Belgium) Gent
18	(Denmark) Copenhagen
19	(Iceland) Víkingur Reykjavík
20	(Bosnia and Herzegovina) Borac Banja Luka
21	(Slovenia) Celje
22	(Cyprus) Omonia
23	(Norway) Molde
24	(Serbia) TSC

== Format ==
Each tie in the knockout phase, apart from the final, is played over two legs, with each team playing one leg at home. The team that scores more goals on aggregate over the two legs advances to the next round. If the aggregate score is level, then 30 minutes of extra time is played (the away goals rule is not applied). If the score is still level at the end of extra time, the winners are decided by a penalty shoot-out. In the final, which is played as a single match, if the score is level at the end of normal time, extra time is played, followed by a penalty shoot-out if the score is still level.

=== Draw procedure ===
In the knockout phase, there is no country protection, with teams from the same association able to face each other in any round. Teams can also face opponents they played during the league phase.

The mechanism of the draws for each round was as follows:

- In the draw for the knockout phase play-offs, the eight teams finishing the league phase in positions 9–16 were seeded, and the eight teams finishing the league phase in positions 17–24 were unseeded. The draw was split into four sections based on the predetermined bracket, with the seeded teams in each section drawn against one of their two possible unseeded opponents. The seeded teams hosted the second leg.
- In the draw for the round of 16, the eight teams finishing the league phase in positions 1–8 were seeded, and the eight winners of the knockout phase play-offs were unseeded. Again, the draw was split into four sections based on the predetermined bracket, with the seeded teams in each section drawn against one of their two possible unseeded opponents. The seeded teams hosted the second leg.
- In the quarter-finals and semi-finals, the exact match pairings were predetermined based on the tournament bracket. A draw was conducted only to determine which team played the first leg at home. The winner of semi-final 1 will be designated as the "home" team for the final (for administrative purposes as it is played at a neutral venue).

In the knockout phase, teams from the same or nearby cities are not scheduled to play at home on the same day or on consecutive days, due to logistics and crowd control. To avoid such scheduling conflict, several adjustments have been made: For the knockout phase play-offs and the round of 16, if the two teams were drawn to play at home for the same leg, the home match of the team that had the lower league phase ranking (if in the same competition) or the team playing in lower tier competition (Conference League) was moved from Thursday from a regularly scheduled time to an earlier time slot, to a different day, and/or at an alternative venue without clashing any other competition. For the quarter-finals and semi-finals, the order of legs of the tie involving the team with the lowest priority is reversed from the original draw.

=== Predetermined pairings ===
The bracket structure for the knockout phase was partially fixed in advance using seeding, with a symmetrical pattern on both sides. Teams' positions in the bracket were determined by their final standings in the league phase, ensuring that higher-ranked teams face lower-ranked opponents in earlier rounds. As a result, certain sets of teams, such as the top two from the league phase, cannot meet until the final.

The structure of each side of the bracket can be summarised as follows, with the exact pairings of the play-offs and round of 16 determined by a draw: (Note: The draws determined the exact play-off and round of 16 pairings for each side of the bracket, which mirrored each other. For example, if the team in 9th was drawn against 23rd in the play-offs, the team in 10th would be drawn against 24th on the other side of the bracket.)

- Knockout phase play-offs
  - Pairing I: 9/10 vs 23/24
  - Pairing II: 11/12 vs 21/22
  - Pairing III: 13/14 vs 19/20
  - Pairing IV: 15/16 vs 17/18
- Round of 16
  - Pairing A: 1/2 vs Winner IV
  - Pairing B: 3/4 vs Winner III
  - Pairing C: 5/6 vs Winner II
  - Pairing D: 7/8 vs Winner I
- Quarter-finals
  - Pairing 1: Winner A vs Winner D
  - Pairing 2: Winner B vs Winner C
- Semi-finals: Winner 1 vs Winner 2

== Schedule ==
The schedule was as follows (all draws were held at the UEFA headquarters in Nyon, Switzerland).

Round	Draw date	First leg	Second leg
Knockout phase play-offs	20 December 2024, 13:00 CET	13 February 2025	20 February 2025
Round of 16	21 February 2025, 14:00 CET	6 March 2025	13 March 2025
Quarter-finals	21 February 2025, 14:00 CET	10 April 2025	17 April 2025
Semi-finals	21 February 2025, 14:00 CET	1 May 2025	8 May 2025
Final	—N/a	28 May 2025 at Wrocław Stadium, Wrocław	

== Bracket ==
Knockout phase play-offs
17	(Belgium) Gent	0	1	1
15	(Spain) Real Betis	3	0	3
24	(Serbia) TSC	1	1	2
9	(Poland) Jagiellonia Białystok	3	3	6
21	(Slovenia) Celje	2	2	4
11	(Cyprus) APOEL	2	0	2
19	(Iceland) Víkingur Reykjavík	2	0	2
13	(Greece) Panathinaikos	1	2	3
22	(Cyprus) Omonia	1	1	2
12	(Cyprus) Pafos	1	2	3
20	(Bosnia and Herzegovina) Borac Banja Luka	1	0	1
14	(Slovenia) Olimpija Ljubljana	0	0	0
23	(Norway) Molde (p)	0	1	1 (5)
10	(Republic of Ireland) Shamrock Rovers	1	0	1 (4)
18	(Denmark) Copenhagen (a.e.t.)	1	3	4
16	(Germany) 1. FC Heidenheim	2	1	3

Round of 16
15	(Spain) Real Betis	2	4	6
2	(Portugal) Vitória de Guimarães	2	0	2
9	(Poland) Jagiellonia Białystok	3	0	3
8	(Belgium) Cercle Brugge	0	2	2
21	(Slovenia) Celje (p)	1	4	5 (3)
6	(Switzerland) Lugano	0	5	5 (1)
13	(Greece) Panathinaikos	3	1	4
3	(Italy) Fiorentina	2	3	5
12	(Cyprus) Pafos	1	0	1
5	(Sweden) Djurgårdens IF	0	3	3
20	(Bosnia and Herzegovina) Borac Banja Luka	1	1	2
4	(Austria) Rapid Wien (a.e.t.)	1	2	3
23	(Norway) Molde	3	0	3
7	(Poland) Legia Warsaw (a.e.t.)	2	2	4
18	(Denmark) Copenhagen	1	0	1
1	(England) Chelsea	2	1	3

Quarter-finals
15	(Spain) Real Betis	2	1	3
9	(Poland) Jagiellonia Białystok	0	1	1
21	(Slovenia) Celje	1	2	3
3	(Italy) Fiorentina	2	2	4
5	(Sweden) Djurgårdens IF (a.e.t.)	0	4	4
4	(Austria) Rapid Wien	1	1	2
7	(Poland) Legia Warsaw	0	2	2
1	(England) Chelsea	3	1	4

Semi-finals
15	(Spain) Real Betis (a.e.t.)	2	2	4
3	(Italy) Fiorentina	1	2	3
5	(Sweden) Djurgårdens IF	1	0	1
1	(England) Chelsea	4	1	5

Final
28 May – Wrocław
15	(Spain) Real Betis	1
1	(England) Chelsea	4

== Knockout phase play-offs ==
The draw for the knockout phase play-offs was held on 20 December 2024, 13:00 CET.

=== Seeding ===
The draw was split into four seeded and four unseeded pots, based on the predetermined pairings for the knockout phase. Teams were allocated based on their final position in the league phase. Teams in positions 9 to 16 were seeded (playing the second legs at home), while teams in positions 17 to 24 were unseeded. The draw began with the unseeded teams, allocating them all to a tie. Once completed, all the seeded teams were drawn into a tie as their opponents.

9/10 vs 23/24		11/12 vs 21/22	
Seeded	Unseeded	Seeded	Unseeded
(Poland) Jagiellonia Białystok; (Republic of Ireland) Shamrock Rovers	(Norway) Molde; (Serbia) TSC	(Cyprus) APOEL; (Cyprus) Pafos	(Slovenia) Celje; (Cyprus) Omonia

13/14 vs 19/20		15/16 vs 17/18	
Seeded	Unseeded	Seeded	Unseeded
(Greece) Panathinaikos; (Slovenia) Olimpija Ljubljana	(Iceland) Víkingur Reykjavík; (Bosnia and Herzegovina) Borac Banja Luka	(Spain) Real Betis; (Germany) 1. FC Heidenheim	(Belgium) Gent; (Denmark) Copenhagen

=== Summary ===
The first legs were played on 13 February, and the second legs were played on 20 February 2025.

Team 1	Agg.	Team 2	1st leg	2nd leg
Gent (Belgium)	1–3	(Spain) Real Betis	0–3	1–0
TSC (Serbia)	2–6	(Poland) Jagiellonia Białystok	1–3	1–3
Celje (Slovenia)	4–2	(Cyprus) APOEL	2–2	2–0
Víkingur Reykjavík (Iceland)	2–3	(Greece) Panathinaikos	2–1	0–2
Copenhagen (Denmark)	4–3	(Germany) 1. FC Heidenheim	1–2	3–1 (a.e.t.)
Molde (Norway)	1–1 (5–4 p)	(Republic of Ireland) Shamrock Rovers	0–1	1–0 (a.e.t.)
Omonia (Cyprus)	2–3	(Cyprus) Pafos	1–1	1–2
Borac Banja Luka (Bosnia and Herzegovina)	1–0	(Slovenia) Olimpija Ljubljana	1–0	0–0

=== Matches ===
13 February 2025
21:00

Gent (Belgium)	0–3	(Spain) Real Betis
	Report	Antony 47'; Bakambu 72'; Altimira 84'

Planet Group Arena, Ghent
Attendance: 11,051
Referee: Horațiu Feșnic (Romania)
20 February 2025
18:45

Real Betis (Spain)	0–1	(Belgium) Gent
	Report	Brown 87'

Benito Villamarín, Seville
Attendance: 51,510
Referee: Damian Sylwestrzak (Poland)

Real Betis won 3–1 on aggregate.

13 February 2025
18:45

TSC (Serbia)	1–3	(Poland) Jagiellonia Białystok
Mboungou 28'	Report	Imaz 31', 89'; Pululu 81'

TSC Arena, Bačka Topola
Attendance: 2,550
Referee: António Nobre (Portugal)
20 February 2025
21:00

Jagiellonia Białystok (Poland)	3–1	(Serbia) TSC
Hansen 8'; Imaz 70'; Radojević 76' (o.g.)	Report	Lazetić 17'

Białystok City Stadium, Białystok
Attendance: 10,243
Referee: Allard Lindhout (Netherlands)

Jagiellonia Białystok won 6–2 on aggregate.

13 February 2025
18:45

Celje (Slovenia)	2–2	(Cyprus) APOEL
Kučys 2', 59'	Report	Abagna 32'; Laifis 70'

Stadion Z'dežele, Celje
Attendance: 4,050
Referee: Mykola Balakin (Ukraine)
20 February 2025
21:00 (22:00 UTC+2)

APOEL (Cyprus)	0–2	(Slovenia) Celje
	Report	Kučys 45+4'; Svetlin 51'

GSP Stadium, Nicosia
Attendance: 9,108
Referee: John Beaton (Scotland)

Celje won 4–2 on aggregate.

13 February 2025
18:45 (19:45 UTC+2)

Víkingur Reykjavík (Iceland)	2–1	(Greece) Panathinaikos
Atlason 13'; Vilhjálmsson 56'	Report	Ioannidis 90+1' (pen.)

Bolt Arena, Helsinki, Finland (Note: Víkingur Reykjavík played their home match at Bolt Arena, Helsinki, Finland, instead of their regular stadium, Víkingsvöllur, Reykjavík, which did not meet UEFA requirements.)
Attendance: 811
Referee: Rohit Saggi (Norway)
20 February 2025
21:00 (22:00 UTC+2)

Panathinaikos (Greece)	2–0	(Iceland) Víkingur Reykjavík
Mladenović 70'; Tetê 90+5'	Report

Olympic Stadium, Athens
Attendance: 8,931
Referee: Rade Obrenović (Slovenia)

Panathinaikos won 3–2 on aggregate.

13 February 2025
21:00

Copenhagen (Denmark)	1–2	(Germany) 1. FC Heidenheim
Larsson 45+1'	Report	Keller 59'; Siersleben 85'

Parken Stadium, Copenhagen
Attendance: 22,789
Referee: Alexandros Tsakalidis (Greece)
20 February 2025
18:45

1. FC Heidenheim (Germany)	1–3 (a.e.t.)	(Denmark) Copenhagen
Scienza 74'	Report	Chiakha 37'; Diks 53' (pen.); Huescas 114'

Voith-Arena, Heidenheim an der Brenz
Attendance: 12,336
Referee: Nikola Dabanović (Montenegro)

Copenhagen won 4–3 on aggregate.

13 February 2025
18:45

Molde (Norway)	0–1	(Republic of Ireland) Shamrock Rovers
	Report	M. Noonan 57'

Aker Stadion, Molde
Attendance: 3,051
Referee: Andris Treimanis (Latvia)
20 February 2025
21:00 (20:00 UTC+0)

Shamrock Rovers (Republic of Ireland)	0–1 (a.e.t.)	(Norway) Molde
	Report	Eikrem 10'
Penalties
Healy (penalty scored); M. Noonan (penalty scored); Greene (penalty missed); J. O'Sullivan (penalty scored); McEneff (penalty scored)	4–5	(penalty scored) Ihler; (penalty scored) Stenevik; (penalty scored) Enggård; (penalty scored) Daga; (penalty scored) Hestad

Tallaght Stadium, Tallaght
Attendance: 9,533
Referee: Anastasios Sidiropoulos (Greece)

1–1 on aggregate; Molde won 5–4 on penalties.

13 February 2025
21:00 (22:00 UTC+2)

Omonia (Cyprus)	1–1	(Cyprus) Pafos
Semedo 51' (pen.)	Report	Oršić 84'

GSP Stadium, Nicosia
Attendance: 13,787
Referee: Simone Sozza (Italy)
20 February 2025
18:45 (19:45 UTC+2)

Pafos (Cyprus)	2–1	(Cyprus) Omonia
Bruno 28'; Silva 65'	Report	Jovetić 60'

Alphamega Stadium, Limassol (Note: Pafos played their home matches at the Alphamega Stadium, Limassol, instead of their regular stadium, Stelios Kyriakides Stadium, Paphos, which did not meet UEFA requirements.)
Attendance: 5,350
Referee: Clément Turpin (France)

Pafos won 3–2 on aggregate.

13 February 2025
21:00

Borac Banja Luka (Bosnia and Herzegovina)	1–0	(Slovenia) Olimpija Ljubljana
Ogrinec 90+1'	Report

Banja Luka City Stadium, Banja Luka
Attendance: 8,406
Referee: Radu Petrescu (Romania)
20 February 2025
18:45

Olimpija Ljubljana (Slovenia)	0–0	(Bosnia and Herzegovina) Borac Banja Luka
	Report

Stožice Stadium, Ljubljana
Attendance: 12,169
Referee: Manfredas Lukjančukas (Lithuania)

Borac Banja Luka won 1–0 on aggregate.

== Round of 16 ==
The draw for the round of 16 was held on 21 February 2025, 14:00 CET.

=== Seeding ===
As the bracket was fixed, the draw contained only four seeded pots, based on the predetermined pairings for the knockout phase, with the top-eight teams allocated based on their final position in the league phase. Teams in positions 1 to 8 were seeded (playing the second legs at home), while the bracket positions of the winners of the knockout phase play-offs (unseeded) were predetermined. The top-eight teams were drawn into the bracket against one of their two possible opponents.

1/2 vs 15/16/17/18		3/4 vs 13/14/19/20	
Seeded	Predetermined	Seeded	Predetermined
(England) Chelsea; (Portugal) Vitória de Guimarães	(Spain) Real Betis; (Denmark) Copenhagen	(Italy) Fiorentina; (Austria) Rapid Wien	(Greece) Panathinaikos; (Bosnia and Herzegovina) Borac Banja Luka

5/6 vs 11/12/21/22		7/8 vs 9/10/23/24	
Seeded	Predetermined	Seeded	Predetermined
(Sweden) Djurgårdens IF; (Switzerland) Lugano	(Slovenia) Celje; (Cyprus) Pafos	(Poland) Legia Warsaw; (Belgium) Cercle Brugge	(Poland) Jagiellonia Białystok; (Norway) Molde

=== Summary ===
The first legs were played on 6 March, and the second legs were played on 13 March 2025.

Team 1	Agg.	Team 2	1st leg	2nd leg
Real Betis (Spain)	6–2	(Portugal) Vitória de Guimarães	2–2	4–0
Jagiellonia Białystok (Poland)	3–2	(Belgium) Cercle Brugge	3–0	0–2
Celje (Slovenia)	5–5 (3–1 p)	(Switzerland) Lugano	1–0	4–5 (a.e.t.)
Panathinaikos (Greece)	4–5	(Italy) Fiorentina	3–2	1–3
Copenhagen (Denmark)	1–3	(England) Chelsea	1–2	0–1
Molde (Norway)	3–4	(Poland) Legia Warsaw	3–2	0–2 (a.e.t.)
Pafos (Cyprus)	1–3	(Sweden) Djurgårdens IF	1–0	0–3
Borac Banja Luka (Bosnia and Herzegovina)	2–3	(Austria) Rapid Wien	1–1	1–2 (a.e.t.)

=== Matches ===
6 March 2025
18:45

Real Betis (Spain)	2–2	(Portugal) Vitória de Guimarães
Bakambu 48'; Isco 75'	Report	Mendes 51'; Oliveira 81'

Benito Villamarín, Seville
Attendance: 44,366
Referee: Nikola Dabanović (Montenegro)
13 March 2025
21:00 (20:00 UTC+0)

Vitória de Guimarães (Portugal)	0–4	(Spain) Real Betis
	Report	Bakambu 5', 20'; Antony 58'; Isco 80'

Estádio D. Afonso Henriques, Guimarães
Attendance: 28,994
Referee: Serdar Gözübüyük (Netherlands)

Real Betis won 6–2 on aggregate.

6 March 2025
21:00

Jagiellonia Białystok (Poland)	3–0	(Belgium) Cercle Brugge
Pululu 69' (pen.), 78'; Romanczuk 75'	Report

Białystok City Stadium, Białystok
Attendance: 17,221
Referee: Anastasios Sidiropoulos (Greece)
13 March 2025
18:45

Cercle Brugge (Belgium)	2–0	(Poland) Jagiellonia Białystok
Van der Bruggen 8'; Felipe Augusto 50'	Report

Jan Breydel Stadium, Bruges
Attendance: 4,646
Referee: Morten Krogh (Denmark)

Jagiellonia Białystok won 3–2 on aggregate.

6 March 2025
21:00

Celje (Slovenia)	1–0	(Switzerland) Lugano
Svetlin 23'	Report

Stadion Z'dežele, Celje
Attendance: 5,712
Referee: António Nobre (Portugal)
13 March 2025
18:45

Lugano (Switzerland)	5–4 (a.e.t.)	(Slovenia) Celje
Mahmoud 21'; Koutsias 42', 80'; Dos Santos 44'; Doumbia 118'	Report	Sešlar 40'; Svetlin 68'; Kučys 90+5' (pen.); Nieto 97'
Penalties
Przybyłko (penalty missed); Steffen (penalty missed); Mai (penalty scored); Cimignani (penalty missed)	1–3	(penalty scored) Edmilson; (penalty scored) Sešlar; (penalty scored) Karničnik

Stockhorn Arena, Thun (Note: Lugano played their home matches at Stockhorn Arena, Thun, instead of their regular stadium, Cornaredo Stadium, Lugano, due to renovation work.)
Attendance: 1,853
Referee: Andris Treimanis (Latvia)

5–5 on aggregate; Celje won 3–1 on penalties.

6 March 2025
18:45 (19:45 UTC+2)

Panathinaikos (Greece)	3–2	(Italy) Fiorentina
Świderski 5'; Maksimović 19'; Tetê 55'	Report	Beltrán 20'; Fagioli 23'

Olympic Stadium, Athens
Attendance: 26,849
Referee: Erik Lambrechts (Belgium)
13 March 2025
21:00

Fiorentina (Italy)	3–1	(Greece) Panathinaikos
Mandragora 12'; Guðmundsson 24'; Kean 75'	Report	Ioannidis 81' (pen.)

Stadio Artemio Franchi, Florence
Attendance: 15,101
Referee: John Beaton (Scotland)

Fiorentina won 5–4 on aggregate.

6 March 2025
18:45

Copenhagen (Denmark)	1–2	(England) Chelsea
Pereira 79'	Report	James 46'; Fernández 65'

Parken Stadium, Copenhagen
Attendance: 35,859
Referee: Georgi Kabakov (Bulgaria)
13 March 2025
21:00 (20:00 UTC+0)

Chelsea (England)	1–0	(Denmark) Copenhagen
Dewsbury-Hall 55'	Report

Stamford Bridge, London
Attendance: 35,280
Referee: Radu Petrescu (Romania)

Chelsea won 3–1 on aggregate.

6 March 2025
18:45

Molde (Norway)	3–2	(Poland) Legia Warsaw
Hestad 11'; Eriksen 17'; Gulbrandsen 43'	Report	Chodyna 64'; Luquinhas 67'

Aker Stadion, Molde
Attendance: 4,098
Referee: Horațiu Feșnic (Romania)
13 March 2025
21:00

Legia Warsaw (Poland)	2–0 (a.e.t.)	(Norway) Molde
Morishita 34'; Gual 108'	Report

Polish Army Stadium, Warsaw
Attendance: 26,153
Referee: Matej Jug (Slovenia)

Legia Warsaw won 4–3 on aggregate.

6 March 2025
21:00 (22:00 UTC+2)

Pafos (Cyprus)	1–0	(Sweden) Djurgårdens IF
Tanković 65'	Report

Alphamega Stadium, Limassol
Attendance: 3,809
Referee: Giorgi Kruashvili (Georgia)
13 March 2025
18:45

Djurgårdens IF (Sweden)	3–0	(Cyprus) Pafos
Fallenius 35'; Stensson 69'; Nguen 86'	Report

3Arena, Stockholm
Attendance: 17,653
Referee: Sebastian Gishamer (Austria)

Djurgårdens IF won 3–1 on aggregate.

6 March 2025
21:00

Borac Banja Luka (Bosnia and Herzegovina)	1–1	(Austria) Rapid Wien
Vuković 90+2' (pen.)	Report	Beljo 34'

Banja Luka City Stadium, Banja Luka
Attendance: 9,652
Referee: Jérôme Brisard (France)
13 March 2025
18:45

Rapid Wien (Austria)	2–1 (a.e.t.)	(Bosnia and Herzegovina) Borac Banja Luka
Beljo 70'; Schaub 96'	Report	Ogrinec 66'

Allianz Stadion, Vienna
Attendance: 23,000
Referee: Allard Lindhout (Netherlands)

Rapid Wien won 3–2 on aggregate.

== Quarter-finals ==
The draw for the order of the quarter-final legs was held on 21 February 2025, 14:00 CET, after the round of 16 draw.

=== Summary ===
The first legs were played on 10 April, and the second legs were played on 17 April 2025.

Team 1	Agg.	Team 2	1st leg	2nd leg
Real Betis (Spain)	3–1	(Poland) Jagiellonia Białystok	2–0	1–1
Celje (Slovenia)	3–4	(Italy) Fiorentina	1–2	2–2
Legia Warsaw (Poland)	2–4 (Note: Order of legs reversed in order to avoid a scheduling conflict with the Europa League's Tottenham Hotspur v Eintracht Frankfurt match in the same city.)	(England) Chelsea	0–3	2–1
Djurgårdens IF (Sweden)	4–2	(Austria) Rapid Wien	0–1	4–1 (a.e.t.)

=== Matches ===
10 April 2025
21:00

Real Betis (Spain)	2–0	(Poland) Jagiellonia Białystok
Bakambu 24'; J. Rodríguez 45+2'	Report

Benito Villamarín, Seville
Attendance: 56,442
Referee: Anthony Taylor (England)
17 April 2025
18:45

Jagiellonia Białystok (Poland)	1–1	(Spain) Real Betis
Churlinov 81'	Report	Bakambu 78'

Białystok City Stadium, Białystok
Attendance: 20,003
Referee: Clément Turpin (France)

Real Betis won 3–1 on aggregate.

10 April 2025
21:00

Celje (Slovenia)	1–2	(Italy) Fiorentina
Delaurier-Chaubet 68' (pen.)	Report	Ranieri 27'; Mandragora 62' (pen.)

Stadion Z'dežele, Celje
Attendance: 12,512
Referee: Felix Zwayer (Germany)
17 April 2025
18:45

Fiorentina (Italy)	2–2	(Slovenia) Celje
Mandragora 37'; Kean 67'	Report	Matko 54'; Nemanič 65'

Stadio Artemio Franchi, Florence
Attendance: 13,195
Referee: João Pinheiro (Portugal)

Fiorentina won 4–3 on aggregate.

10 April 2025
18:45

Legia Warsaw (Poland)	0–3	(England) Chelsea
	Report	George 49'; Madueke 57', 74'

Polish Army Stadium, Warsaw
Attendance: 29,055
Referee: Serdar Gözübüyük (Netherlands)
17 April 2025
21:00 (20:00 UTC+1)

Chelsea (England)	1–2	(Poland) Legia Warsaw
Cucurella 33'	Report	Pekhart 10' (pen.); Kapuadi 53'

Stamford Bridge, London
Attendance: 32,549
Referee: Alejandro Hernández Hernández (Spain)

Chelsea won 4–2 on aggregate.

10 April 2025
21:00

Djurgårdens IF (Sweden)	0–1	(Austria) Rapid Wien
	Report	Finndell 62' (o.g.)

3Arena, Stockholm
Attendance: 23,531
Referee: Tobias Stieler (Germany)
17 April 2025
21:00

Rapid Wien (Austria)	1–4 (a.e.t.)	(Sweden) Djurgårdens IF
Une 45+1' (o.g.)	Report	Danielson 42' (pen.); Kosugi 77'; Gulliksen 93', 105'

Allianz Stadion, Vienna
Attendance: 25,600
Referee: Anthony Taylor (England)

Djurgårdens IF won 4–2 on aggregate.

== Semi-finals ==
The draw for the order of the semi-final legs was held on 21 February 2025, 14:00 CET, after the round of 16 and quarter-final draws.

=== Summary ===
The first legs were played on 1 May, and the second legs were played on 8 May 2025.

Team 1	Agg.	Team 2	1st leg	2nd leg
Real Betis (Spain)	4–3	(Italy) Fiorentina	2–1	2–2 (a.e.t.)
Djurgårdens IF (Sweden)	1–5 (Note: Order of legs reversed in order to avoid a scheduling conflict with the Europa League's Tottenham Hotspur v Bodø/Glimt match in the same city.)	(England) Chelsea	1–4	0–1

=== Matches ===
1 May 2025
21:00

Real Betis (Spain)	2–1	(Italy) Fiorentina
Ezzalzouli 6'; Antony 64'	Report	Ranieri 73'

Benito Villamarín, Seville
Attendance: 56,417
Referee: Michael Oliver (England)
8 May 2025
21:00

Fiorentina (Italy)	2–2 (a.e.t.)	(Spain) Real Betis
Gosens 34', 42'	Report	Antony 30'; Ezzalzouli 97'

Stadio Artemio Franchi, Florence
Attendance: 21,252
Referee: Glenn Nyberg (Sweden)

Real Betis won 4–3 on aggregate.

1 May 2025
21:00

Djurgårdens IF (Sweden)	1–4	(England) Chelsea
Alemayehu 68'	Report	Sancho 13'; Madueke 43'; Jackson 59', 65'

3Arena, Stockholm
Attendance: 26,703
Referee: Sandro Schärer (Switzerland)
8 May 2025
21:00 (20:00 UTC+1)

Chelsea (England)	1–0	(Sweden) Djurgårdens IF
Dewsbury-Hall 38'	Report

Stamford Bridge, London
Attendance: 32,464
Referee: João Pinheiro (Portugal)

Chelsea won 5–1 on aggregate.

== Final ==
The final was played on 28 May 2025 at the Wrocław Stadium in Wrocław. The winner of semi-final 1 was designated as the "home" team for administrative purposes.

28 May 2025
21:00

Real Betis (Royal Spanish Football Federation)	1–4	(The Football Association) Chelsea
Ezzalzouli 9'	Report	Fernández 65'; Jackson 70'; Sancho 83'; Caicedo 90+1'

Wrocław Stadium, Wrocław
Attendance: 39,754
Referee: Irfan Peljto (Bosnia and Herzegovina)
