= 2023–24 Jagiellonia Białystok season =

Jagiellonia Białystok
2023–24 season
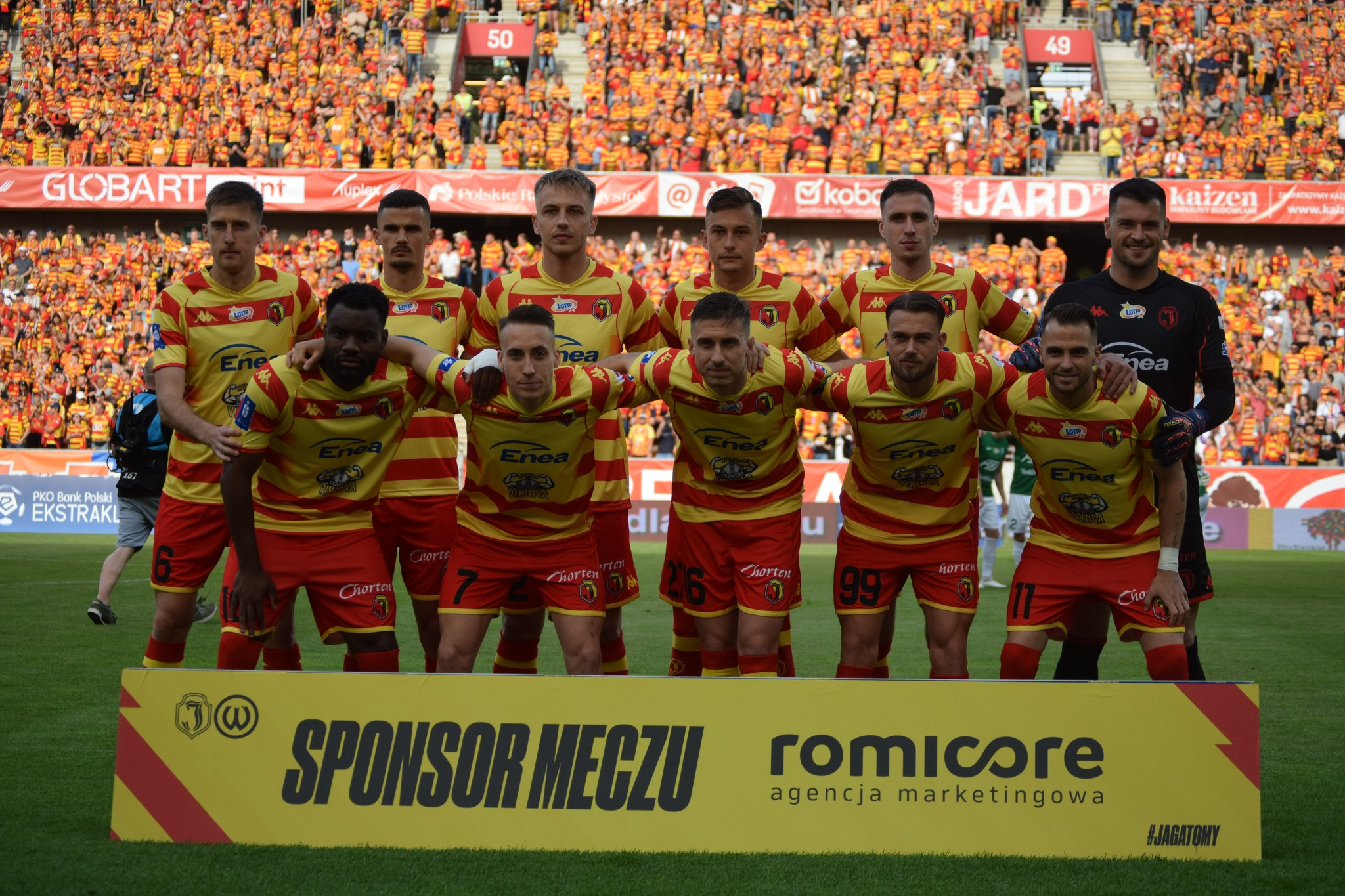
- Jagiellonia Białystok before the match of the last round of the 2023–24 Ekstraklasa against Warta Poznań, the match where Jagiellonia became the Polish champion
- Manager: Adrian Siemieniec
- Stadium: Białystok Stadium
- Ekstraklasa: 1st
- Polish Cup: Semi-finals
- Top goalscorer: League: Jesús Imaz (12); All: Jesús Imaz (14)
- Average home league attendance: 13,744
- Biggest win: Jagiellonia Białystok 6–0 ŁKS Łódź
- Biggest defeat: Raków Częstochowa 3–0 Jagiellonia Białystok
Home colours

The 2023–24 season was the 104th season since the founding of Jagiellonia Białystok and the 17th in the Polish top division.

On 25 May 2024, Jagiellonia won the Ekstraklasa title for the first time in the club's 104-year history, following a 3–0 win over Warta Poznań on the final day of the season.

== Pre-season and friendlies ==
1 July 2023 Friendly	Jagiellonia Białystok (Poland)	2–1	(Poland) Radomiak Radom
17:00

4 July 2023 Friendly	Motor Lublin (Poland)	1–1	(Poland) Jagiellonia Białystok
17:00

7 July 2023 Friendly	Jagiellonia Białystok (Poland)	0–1	(Poland) Polonia Warsaw
11:30

15 July 2023 Friendly	Jagiellonia Białystok (Poland)	1–0	(Slovakia) MFK Zemplín Michalovce
11:00

17 January 2024 Friendly	Jagiellonia Białystok (Poland)	0–0	(Poland) Motor Lublin
11:30

23 January 2024 Friendly	Jagiellonia Białystok (Poland)	1–2	(Kosovo) Ballkani
15:00

27 January 2024 Friendly	Jagiellonia Białystok (Poland)	2–2	(Kazakhstan) Ordabasy
10:00

31 January 2024 Friendly	Zorya Luhansk (Ukraine)	2–2	(Poland) Jagiellonia Białystok
09:00

== Competitions ==
=== Overall record ===
Competition	First match	Last match	Starting round	Final position	Record							
Competition	First match	Last match	Starting round	Final position	Pld	W	D	L	GF	GA	GD	Win %
Ekstraklasa	22 July 2023	25 May 2024	Matchday 1	Winners	34	18	9	7	77	45	+32	52.94
Polish Cup	26 September 2023	3 April 2024	First round	Semi-finals	5	4	0	1	10	4	+6	80.00
Total					39	22	9	8	87	49	+38	56.41

Source: Competitions

=== Ekstraklasa ===
==== League table ====
Pos	Team	Pld	W	D	L	GF	GA	GD	Pts	Qualification or relegation
1	Jagiellonia Białystok	34	18	9	7	77	45	+32	63 (Note: Jagiellonia Białystok finished ahead of Śląsk Wrocław on head-to-head goal difference: Śląsk Wrocław 2–1 Jagiellonia Białystok, Jagiellonia Białystok 3–1 Śląsk Wrocław)	Qualification for the Champions League second qualifying round
2	Śląsk Wrocław	34	18	9	7	50	31	+19	63	Qualification for the Conference League second qualifying round
3	Legia Warsaw	34	16	11	7	51	39	+12	59	Qualification for the Conference League second qualifying round
4	Pogoń Szczecin	34	16	7	11	59	38	+21	55	
5	Lech Poznań	34	14	11	9	47	41	+6	53	

Source: ekstraklasa.org 90minut.pl
Rules for classification: 1) Points; 2) Head-to-head points; 3) Head-to-head goal difference; 4) Goal difference; 5) Goals scored; 6) Number of wins; 7) Number of away wins; 8) Lower number of points based on yellow and red cards (red card = 3 points, yellow card = 1 point, sending-off = 3 points - including 1 point for first yellow card); 9) Fairplay ranking; 10) Draw.
(Note: Head-to-head record is used only after all the matches between the teams in question have been played)

==== Results summary ====
Overall								Home						Away					
Pld	W	D	L	GF	GA	GD	Pts	W	D	L	GF	GA	GD	W	D	L	GF	GA	GD
34	18	9	7	77	45	+32	63	12	3	2	46	16	+30	6	6	5	31	29	+2

Source: Ekstraklasa

==== Results by round ====
Round	1	2	3	4	5	6	7	8	9	10	11	12	13	14	15	16	17	18	19	20	21	22	23	24	25	26	27	28	29	30	31	32	33	34
Ground	A	H	H	A	A	H	A	H	A	H	A	H	A	H	A	H	A	H	A	A	H	H	A	H	A	H	A	H	A	H	A	H	A	H
Result	L	W	W	D	W	W	L	W	D	W	W	W	L	W	D	D	W	W	D	W	L	D	L	W	W	W	D	L	W	D	L	W	D	W
Position																																		

Source: Ekstraklasa
A = Away; H = Home; W = Win; D = Draw; L = Loss

==== Matches ====
The fixtures were unveiled on 14 June 2023.

22 July 2023 1	Raków Częstochowa	3–0	Jagiellonia Białystok	Częstochowa
17:30	Zwoliński 45+2', 63' (pen.); Nowak 65'			Stadium: Raków Municipal Stadium; Referee: Paweł Raczkowski

29 July 2023 2	Jagiellonia Białystok	4–1	Puszcza Niepołomice	Białystok
17:30	Łaski 45+2'; Nené 66'; Pululu 81'; Lewicki 88'		Solowiej 76'	Stadium: Białystok Stadium; Referee: Patryk Gryckiewicz

4 August 2023 3	Jagiellonia Białystok	2–1	Widzew Łódź	Białystok
18:00	Pululu 79' (pen.); Wdowik 86'		Terpiłowski 36'	Stadium: Białystok Stadium; Referee: Bartosz Frankowski

19 August 2023 5	Ruch Chorzów	0–1	Jagiellonia Białystok	Chorzów
			Nené 84'	Stadium: Ruch Chorzów Stadium

27 August 2023 6	Jagiellonia Białystok	4–1	Górnik Zabrze	Białystok
	Naranjo 7'; Imaz 17'; Wdowik 45'; Marczuk 64'		Musiolik 37'	Stadium: Białystok Stadium

3 September 2023 7	Śląsk Wrocław	2–1	Jagiellonia Białystok	Wrocław
	Expósito 47', 81' (pen.)		Wdowik 61' (pen.)	Stadium: Wrocław Stadium

17 September 2023 8	Jagiellonia Białystok	3–2	Radomiak Radom	Białystok
	Imaz 27'; Naranjo 45+8'; Pululu 46'		Pedro Henrique 3', 12'	Stadium: Białystok Stadium

22 September 2023 9	ŁKS Łódź	2–2	Jagiellonia Białystok	Łódź
				Stadium: Władysław Król Stadium

1 October 2023 10	Jagiellonia Białystok	2–0	Legia Warsaw	Białystok
				Stadium: Białystok Stadium

8 October 2023 11	Cracovia	2–4	Jagiellonia Białystok	Kraków
				Stadium: Józef Piłsudski Stadium

20 October 2023 12	Jagiellonia Białystok	3–0	Zagłębie Lubin	Białystok
				Stadium: Białystok Stadium

24 October 2023 4	Lech Poznań	3–3	Jagiellonia Białystok	Poznań
				Stadium: Poznań Stadium

28 October 2023 13	Pogoń Szczecin	2–1	Jagiellonia Białystok	Szczecin
				Stadium: Florian Krygier Stadium

3 November 2023 14	Jagiellonia Białystok	4–0	Stal Mielec	Białystok
				Stadium: Białystok Stadium

11 November 2023 15	Korona Kielce	2–2	Jagiellonia Białystok	Kielce
				Stadium: Kielce Stadium

24 November 2023 16	Jagiellonia Białystok	0–0	Piast Gliwice	Białystok
				Stadium: Białystok Stadium

1 December 2023 17	Warta Poznań	1–2	Jagiellonia Białystok	Poznań
				Stadium: Warta Poznań Stadium

10 December 2023 18	Jagiellonia Białystok	4–2	Raków Częstochowa	Białystok
				Stadium: Białystok Stadium

16 December 2023 19	Puszcza Niepołomice	3–3	Jagiellonia Białystok	Kraków
				Stadium: Józef Piłsudski Stadium

11 February 2024 20	Widzew Łódź	1–3	Jagiellonia Białystok	Łódź
				Stadium: Widzew Łódź Stadium

17 February 2024 21	Jagiellonia Białystok	1–2	Lech Poznań	Białystok
				Stadium: Białystok Stadium

24 February 2024 22	Jagiellonia Białystok	1–1	Ruch Chorzów	Białystok
				Stadium: Białystok Stadium

2 March 2024 23	Górnik Zabrze	2–1	Jagiellonia Białystok	Zabrze
				Stadium: Arena Zabrze

8 March 2024 24	Jagiellonia Białystok	3–1	Śląsk Wrocław	Białystok
				Stadium: Białystok Stadium

16 March 2024 25	Radomiak Radom	0–2	Jagiellonia Białystok	Radom
				Stadium: Czachor Brothers Stadium

30 March 2024 26	Jagiellonia Białystok	6–0	ŁKS Łódź	Białystok
				Stadium: Białystok Stadium

7 April 2024 27	Legia Warsaw	1–1	Jagiellonia Białystok	Warsaw
17:30				Stadium: Polish Army Stadium; Referee: Szymon Marciniak

14 April 2024 28	Jagiellonia Białystok	1–3	Cracovia	Białystok
				Stadium: Białystok Stadium

20 April 2024 20	Zagłębie Lubin	1–2	Jagiellonia Białystok	Lubin
20:00				Stadium: Lubin Stadium

26 April 2024 30	Jagiellonia Białystok	2–2	Pogoń Szczecin	Białystok
				Stadium: Białystok Stadium

4 May 2024 31	Stal Mielec	3–2	Jagiellonia Białystok	Mielec
20:00				Stadium: Mielec Stadium

11 May 2024 32	Jagiellonia Białystok	3–0	Korona Kielce	Białystok
				Stadium: Białystok Stadium

18 May 2024 33	Piast Gliwice	1–1	Jagiellonia Białystok	Gliwice
20:00				Stadium: Piotr Wieczorek Stadium

25 May 2024 34	Jagiellonia Białystok	3–0	Warta Poznań	Białystok
17:30				Stadium: Białystok Stadium

=== Polish Cup ===
26 September 2023 First round	Jagiellonia Białystok	2–0	Śląsk Wrocław	Białystok
21:00	Nené 62'; Jesús Imaz 90+2'			Stadium: Białystok Stadium; Referee: Paweł Raczkowski

8 November 2023 Round of 32	Resovia Rzeszów	1–3	Jagiellonia Białystok	Rzeszów
20:00				Stadium: Stal Rzeszów Municipal Stadium; Referee: Wojciech Myć

5 December 2023 Round of 16	Jagiellonia Białystok	2–0	Warta Poznań	Białystok
21:00	Jesús Imaz 64'; Nené 75'			Stadium: Białystok Stadium; Referee: Paweł Raczkowski

28 February 2024 Quarter-finals	Jagiellonia Białystok	2–1 (a.e.t.)	Korona Kielce	Białystok
17:30				Stadium: Białystok Stadium; Referee: Tomasz Musiał

3 April 2024 Semi-finals	Pogoń Szczecin	2–1	Jagiellonia Białystok	Szczecin
20:30				Stadium: Florian Krygier Stadium; Referee: Paweł Raczkowski

== Statistics ==
=== Goalscorers ===
Position	Players	Ekstraklasa	Polish Cup	Total
FW	(Spain) Jesús Imaz	12	2	14
MF	(Portugal) Nené	9	2	11
MF	(Poland) Bartłomiej Wdowik	9	1	10
MF	(Norway) Kristoffer Normann Hansen	9	0	9
FW	(Spain) José Naranjo	6	2	8
MF	(Poland) Dominik Marczuk	6	0	6
DF	(Poland) Mateusz Skrzypczak	3	0	3
FW	(Germany) Kaan Caliskaner	2	0	2
