= Tomás Silva (footballer, born 1999) =

Portuguese footballer

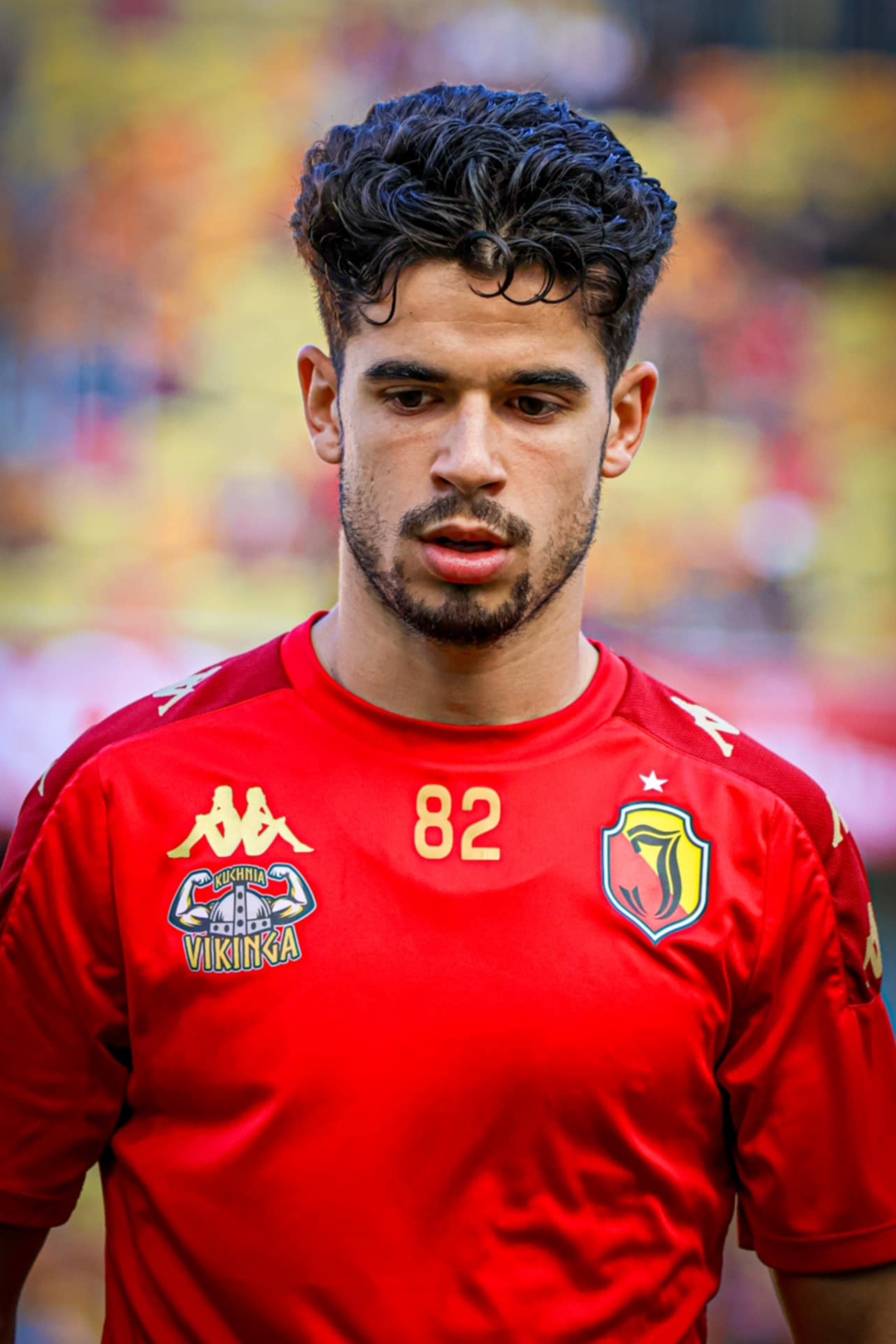
- Silva with Jagiellonia Białystok in 2025

Personal information
- Full name: Tomás Costa Silva
- Date of birth: 15 October 1999 (age 27)
- Place of birth: Viana do Castelo, Portugal
- Height: 1.73 m (5 ft 8 in)
- Positions: Winger; right-back

Team information
- Current team: Spartak Varna
- Number: 82

Youth career
- 2008–2018: Sporting CP

Senior career*
| Years | Team | Apps | (Gls) |
| 2018–2020 | Sporting CP U23 | 65 | (10) |
| 2020–2021 | Sporting CP B | 26 | (3) |
| 2021 | Sporting CP | 1 | (0) |
| 2021–2024 | Vizela | 57 | (1) |
| 2022 | → Varzim (loan) | 14 | (0) |
| 2024–2025 | Jagiellonia Białystok | 16 | (1) |
| 2024–2025 | Jagiellonia Białystok II | 8 | (0) |
| 2025–2026 | Dobrudzha | 29 | (4) |
| 2026– | Spartak Varna | 3 | (0) |

International career
| 2019 | Portugal U20 | 1 | (0) |
- * Club domestic league appearances and goals as of 12:00, 4 August 2026 (UTC)

Tomás Costa Silva (born 15 October 1999) is a Portuguese professional footballer who plays as a right winger or right-back for Bulgarian First League club Spartak Varna.

== Club career ==
=== Sporting CP ===
Born in Viana do Castelo, Silva joined Sporting CP's academy at the age of 8. He made his senior debut with their under-23 and reserve sides.

Silva played his first Primeira Liga match with the main squad on the last day of the 2020–21 season, a 5–1 home win against C.S. Marítimo on 19 May; his appearance came as a reward for his hard work in training, and earned him a champions medal in the process.

=== Vizela ===
On 18 June 2021, Silva signed a three-year contract with F.C. Vizela, recently promoted to the top division. He made his debut in the competition for the club on 6 August, as a second-half substitute for Alex Mendez in the 3–0 away loss to his former team Sporting.

Silva was loaned to Varzim S.C. of the Liga Portugal 2 on 26 January 2022, until 30 June. After returning to the Estádio do FC Vizela, on 12 September 2022 he was sent off for two yellow cards in a 0–1 home defeat to G.D. Estoril Praia, the second for diving in the box.

=== Jagiellonia ===
On 2 August 2024, Silva moved to defending Polish Ekstraklasa champions Jagiellonia Białystok on a deal until June 2026, with an optional third year; he was assigned number 82. He scored his only goal on 21 September on his starting debut, opening an eventual 3–2 home victory over Lechia Gdańsk.

Silva was released by mutual consent on 8 September 2025.

=== Bulgaria ===
On 16 September 2025, Silva joined First Professional Football League side FC Dobrudzha Dobrich. For the following campaign, he remained in the country with FC Spartak Varna.

== International career ==
Silva won one cap for Portugal at under-20 level, when he featured 23 minutes of the 3–0 friendly victory over Cape Verde on 30 January 2019.

== Honours ==
Sporting CP

- Primeira Liga: 2020–21
