= Afimico Pululu =

DR Congolese footballer (born 1999)

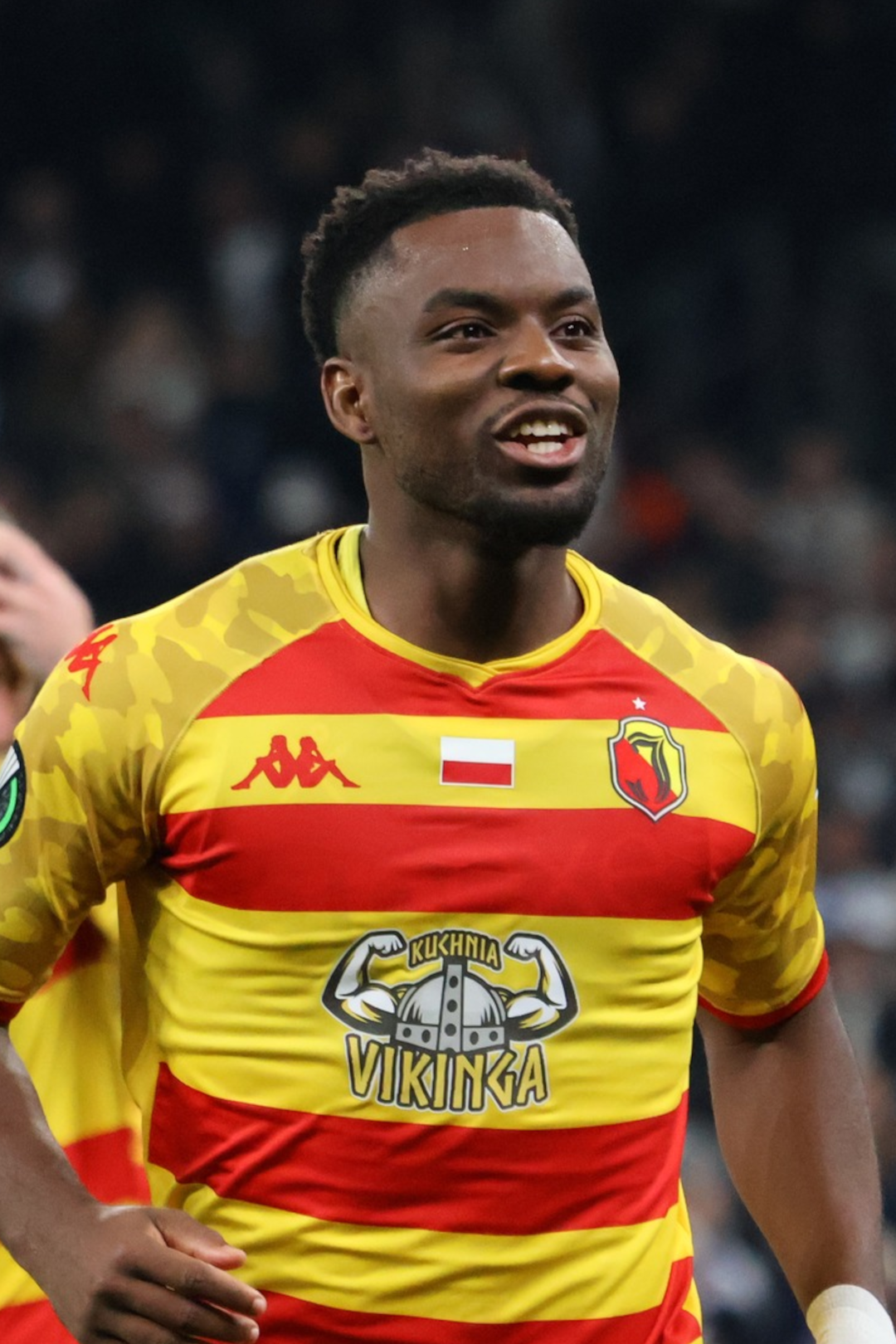
- Pululu with Jagiellonia Białystok in 2024

Personal information
- Date of birth: 23 March 1999 (age 27)
- Place of birth: Luanda, Angola
- Height: 1.75 m (5 ft 9 in)
- Position: Forward

Team information
- Current team: Al-Hazem
- Number: 9

Youth career
- –2013: A.S. Coteaux Mulhouse
- 2013–2017: Basel

Senior career*
Years	Team	Apps	(Gls)
2015–2021	Basel II	62	(27)
2017–2022	Basel	59	(4)
2019	→ Xamax (loan)	17	(2)
2022–2023	Greuther Fürth	21	(1)
2022	Greuther Fürth II	10	(8)
2023–2026	Jagiellonia Białystok	95	(37)
2023	Jagiellonia Białystok II	1	(0)
2026–	Al-Hazem	9	(2)

International career^{‡}
2026–	DR Congo	1	(0)
- * Club domestic league appearances and goals as of 22:36, 29 October 2026 (UTC) ‡ National team caps and goals as of 23:55, 2 October 2026 (UTC)

Afimico Pululu (born 23 March 1999) is a professional footballer who plays as a forward for Saudi Pro League club Al-Hazem. Born in Angola, he represents the DR Congo national team.

== Club career ==
=== Youth career ===
Pululu started his youth career with local club A.S. Coteaux Mulhouse. In the summer of 2013, he moved to Basel's youth academy and advanced through all stages, until in 2015 he reached their under-21 team, playing in the third tier of Swiss football.

=== Basel ===
In May 2017, Pululu signed a four-year contract and advanced to Basel's first team under head coach Urs Fischer. After playing in three test games, Pululu played his domestic league debut for the club in a home game on 20 August 2017 as Basel played a 1–1 draw with Lugano at the St. Jakob-Park.

=== Loan to Xamax ===
On 29 January 2019, Basel announced that Pululu was transferred to Xamax on loan until the end of the season. He made his first appearance for Xamax against Young Boys on 2 February. He scored two goals for Xamax in the match against Sion on 9 March.

=== Return to Basel ===
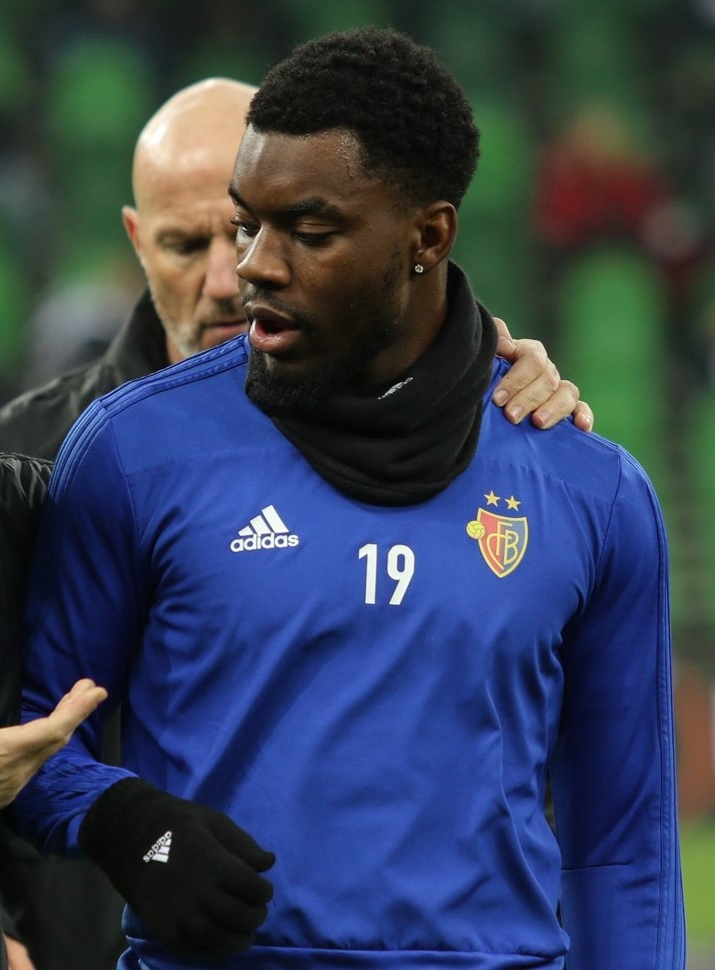
Pululu with Basel in 2019

He returned to Basel for their 2019–20 season under head coach Marcel Koller and signed an extended contract until summer 2022. In the team's first test match that season, Pululu was substituted in at half-time and scored a hat-trick to help the team win 4–2 against SC Kriens after being two goals down at the break. He scored his first domestic league goal for his club on 8 December in the home game as Basel won 1–0 against Sion. Across the season, Pululu made 29 appearances, however always as substitute. To gain match practice, he played for the under-21 team. Therefore, the club looked for a new solution and the player left Basel on a free transfer.

Between 2017 and 2022, Pululu played a total of 115 games for Basel's first team, scoring a total of 13 goals. 59 of these games were in the Swiss Super League, eight in the Swiss Cup, six in the UEFA competitions (Champions, Europa and Conference League) and 32 were friendly games. He scored four goals in the domestic league, one in the cup and the other eight were scored during the test games.

=== Greuther Fürth ===
On 7 January 2022, Basel announced that Pululu would move to Bundesliga side Greuther Fürth. Greuther Fürth confirmed the transfer on the same day and stated that the player had signed on a two-and-a-half-year deal.

=== Jagiellonia ===
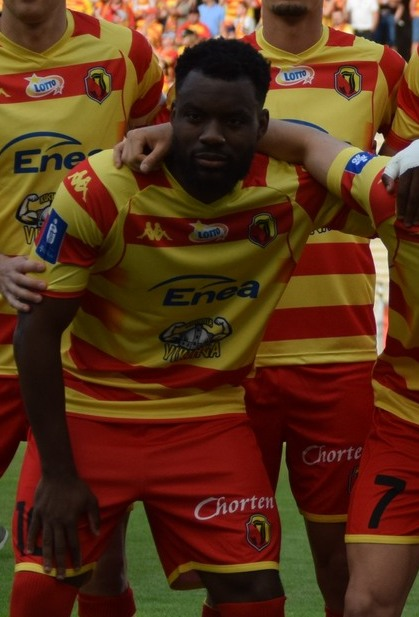
Pululu lining up for Jagiellonia Białystok in 2024

On 22 June 2023, Pululu joined Polish Ekstraklasa club Jagiellonia Białystok, signing a two-year deal with an extension option. He was given squad number 10. He made his debut on 22 July 2023 in a 3–0 away loss to Raków Częstochowa. He scored his first goal for Jagiellonia in a 4–1 home win over Puszcza Niepołomice on 29 July 2023. During that match, he came off the bench in the 79th minute, scoring a goal two minutes later. During the 2023–24 season, Pululu scored 14 goals, 12 in the league and two in the Polish Cup. On 7 November 2024, Pululu scored the opening goal in a 3–0 victory over Molde in the UEFA Conference League.

Pululu became the top scorer of the 2024–25 UEFA Conference League season with eight goals.

On 21 May 2026, Pululu announced that he would depart the club upon the expiration of his contract in June. In total, he made 134 appearances for Jagiellonia, recording 56 goals and 17 assists.

=== Al-Hazem ===
On 4 August 2026, Pululu signed with Saudi Pro League club Al-Hazem.

== International career ==
Born in Angola to parents from the Democratic Republic of the Congo, and raised in France, Pululu is eligible for either country at international level.

In March 2025, after being approached by both DR Congo and Angola team officials, Pululu chose to represent the latter. He received his first call-up for the 2026 FIFA World Cup qualification matches against Libya and Cape Verde to be played on 20 and 25 March, but withdrew from the squad for health reasons on 18 March.

In May 2025, Pululu reverted his decision to play for Angola and pledged his allegiance to DR Congo, after being persuaded by their assistant head coach Rafael Hamidi Cuadros. On 8 May, he was called up for upcoming friendlies against Mali and Madagascar. On 7 June, he pulled out of the squad due to an injury.

In January 2026, Pululu obtained Congolese nationality and was cleared to represent the DR Congo national team.

He was one of the players who were called up with the DR Congo national team by head coach Sébastien Desabre for the 2027 Africa Cup of Nations qualification matches against Equatorial Guinea (24 September 2026), Zimbabwe (28 September) and the 2 friendlies against Uganda (2 and 5 October). He made his international debut in their first friendly against Uganda, which they lost 2–0.

== Career statistics ==
=== Club ===
As of match played 8 September 2026

Appearances and goals by club, season and competition
Club	Season	League			National cup (Note: Includes Swiss Cup, DFB-Pokal, Polish Cup, King's Cup)		Continental		Other		Total	
Club	Season	Division	Apps	Goals	Apps	Goals	Apps	Goals	Apps	Goals	Apps	Goals
Basel	2017–18	Swiss Super League	2	0	—		—		—		2	0
Basel	2018–19	Swiss Super League	10	0	2	0	1 (Note: Appearance(s) in UEFA Europa League)	0	—		13	0
Basel	2019–20	Swiss Super League	21	1	5	1	10 (Note: Three appearances in UEFA Champions League, seven appearances in UEFA Europa League)	0	—		36	2
Basel	2020–21	Swiss Super League	25	3	1	0	3	0	—		29	3
Basel	2021–22	Swiss Super League	1	0	0	0	2 (Note: Appearances in UEFA Champions League)	0	—		3	0
Basel	Total		59	4	8	1	16	0	—		83	5
Xamax (loan)	2018–19	Swiss Super League	17	2	—		—		—		17	2
Greuther Fürth	2021–22	Bundesliga	8	0	—		—		—		8	0
Greuther Fürth	2022–23	2. Bundesliga	13	1	0	0	—		—		13	1
Greuther Fürth	Total		21	1	0	0	—		—		21	1
Jagiellonia Białystok II	2023–24	III liga, group I	1	0	—		—		—		1	0
Jagiellonia Białystok	2023–24	Ekstraklasa	31	12	3	2	—		—		34	14
Jagiellonia Białystok	2024–25	Ekstraklasa	31	10	3	1	18 (Note: Four appearances and two goals in UEFA Champions League, two appearances in UEFA Europa League, twelve appearances and eight goals in UEFA Conference League)	10	1 (Note: Appearance in Polish Super Cup)	0	53	21
Jagiellonia Białystok	2025–26	Ekstraklasa	33	15	2	1	12 (Note: Appearances in UEFA Conference League)	5	—		47	21
Jagiellonia Białystok	Total		95	37	8	4	30	15	1	0	134	56
Al-Hazem	2026–27	Saudi Pro League	6	1	1	2	—		—		7	3
Career total			199	45	17	7	46	15	1	0	263	67

=== International ===
As of match played 2 October 2026

Appearances and goals by national team and year
National team	Year	Apps	Goals
DR Congo	2026	1	0
Total		1	0

== Honours ==
Basel

- Swiss Cup: 2018–19

Jagiellonia Białystok

- Ekstraklasa: 2023–24
- Polish Super Cup: 2024

Individual

- Ekstraklasa Player of the Month: May 2024
- Ekstraklasa Team of the Season: 2023–24
- UEFA Conference League top scorer: 2024–25
- UEFA Conference League Team of the Season: 2024–25
