= 2024–25 Lechia Gdańsk season =

Lechia Gdańsk
2024–25 season
- Manager: Szymon Grabowski
- Stadium: Polsat Plus Arena Gdańsk
- Ekstraklasa: Pre-season
- Polish Cup: Pre-season
- Average home league attendance: 12,001
Home colours	Away colours	Third colours

The 2024–25 season will be the 80th season in the history of Lechia Gdańsk. The season marks Lechia's return to the top flight after an absence of only one season. In addition to the domestic league, the team is scheduled to participate in the Polish Cup.

== Players ==
=== First team squad ===
Note: Flags indicate national team as defined under FIFA eligibility rules; some limited exceptions apply. Players may hold more than one non-FIFA nationality.

No.	Pos.	Nation	Player
1	GK	POL	Szymon Weirauch
3	DF	SWE	Elias Olsson
4	DF	ROU	Andrei Chindriș
5	MF	UKR	Ivan Zhelizko
6	MF	SWE	Karl Wendt
7	MF	COL	Camilo Mena
8	MF	BIH	Rifet Kapić
9	FW	UKR	Bohdan Vyunnyk
11	DF	POL	Dominik Piła
16	MF	AUS	Louis D'Arrigo
17	MF	UKR	Anton Tsarenko (on loan from Dynamo Kyiv)
19	MF	UKR	Serhiy Buletsa (on loan from Dynamo Kyiv) (substituted off)
20	DF	BRA	Conrado (substituted off)
21	FW	POL	Michał Głogowski (substituted on)

No.	Pos.	Nation	Player
23	DF	POL	Miłosz Kałahur
24	DF	POL	Bartosz Brylowski
29	GK	UKR	Bohdan Sarnavskyi
30	MF	UKR	Maksym Khlan
33	MF	POL	Tomasz Wójtowicz
42	MF	POL	Adam Kardaś
44	DF	KOS	Bujar Pllana
45	DF	POL	Marcel Bajko
77	FW	POL	Bartosz Borkowski
79	FW	POL	Kacper Sezonienko
81	GK	POL	Kacper Gutowski
89	FW	SVK	Tomáš Bobček
94	DF	FRA	Loup-Diwan Gueho (on loan from Bastia)
99	MF	POL	Tomasz Neugebauer

Key

Symbol	Meaning
Substituted on	Player arrived at the club during the season.
Substituted off	Player left at any point during the season after making an appearance for the first team.

=== Out on loan ===
Note: Flags indicate national team as defined under FIFA eligibility rules; some limited exceptions apply. Players may hold more than one non-FIFA nationality.

No.	Pos.	Nation	Player
21	FW	POL	Michał Głogowski (at Hutnik Kraków until 31 December 2024)
26	DF	POL	Bartosz Brzęk (at Wieczysta Kraków until 30 June 2025)
72	DF	POL	Filip Koperski (at Olimpia Grudziądz until 30 June 2025)

=== Transfers ===
==== In ====
No.	Pos.	Player	From	Type	Window	Fee	Date	Source
1	GK	Szymon Weirauch	Zagłębie Lubin	Transfer	Summer	€225,000	1 July 2024	
8	MF	Rifet Kapić	Valmiera	Transfer	Summer	€750,000	1 July 2024	
19	MF	Serhiy Buletsa	Dynamo Kyiv	Loan	Summer	Free	12 July 2024	
6	MF	Karl Wendt	Trelleborg	Transfer	Summer	??	18 July 2024	
33	MF	Tomasz Wójtowicz	Ruch Chorzów	Transfer	Summer	??	24 July 2024	
44	DF	Bujar Pllana	Slaven Belupo	Transfer	Summer	??	9 August 2024	
17	MF	Anton Tsarenko	Dynamo Kyiv	Loan	Summer	Free	23 August 2024	
21	FW	Michał Głogowski	Hutnik Kraków	Transfer	Summer	??	6 September 2024	

==== Out ====
No.	Pos.	Player	To	Type	Window	Fee	Date	Source
9	FW	Łukasz Zjawiński	Polonia Warsaw	Transfer	Summer	??	1 July 2024	
26	DF	Bartosz Brzęk	Wieczysta Kraków	Loan	Summer	Free	1 July 2024	
83	GK	Antoni Mikułko	Wieczysta Kraków	Transfer	Summer	??	1 July 2024	
80	MF	Dominik Lemka	Chojniczanka Chojnice	Transfer	Summer	Free	15 July 2024	
22	GK	Bartłomiej Kałduński	KP Starogard Gdański	Transfer	Summer	Free	13 August 2024	
6	MF	Jan Biegański	Sivasspor	Transfer	Summer	??	16 August 2024	
72	DF	Filip Koperski	Olimpia Grudziądz	Loan	Summer	Free	6 September 2024	
–	FW	Michał Głogowski	Hutnik Kraków	Loan	Summer	Free	6 September 2024	-
–	FW	Luis Fernández	Free Agent	Summer	Transfer	Free	27 September 2024	-
20	DF	Conrado	Atlético Goianiense	Transfer	Winter	Free	6 February 2025	

==== Retired ====
No.	Pos.	Player	Date
–	MF	David Stec	30 July 2024

=== Friendlies ===
==== Summer ====
Preparation for the season began on June 18.

22 June 2024	Tylko Lechia Gdańsk (Poland)	1–7	(Poland) Lechia Gdańsk	Gdańsk
13:00	Krzysztof Rusinek 45'	Report	Kacper Sezonienko 3'; Bartosz Borkowski 14'; Tomáš Bobček 18'; Tomasz Neugebauer 30'; Adam Kardaś 31'; Loup-Diwan Guého 44'; Patryk Łuszcz 50'	Stadium: Gdańsk Sports Center Stadium

3 July 2024	Lechia Gdańsk (Poland)	1–1	(Poland) Chojniczanka Chojnice	Władysławowo
15:00	Camilo Mena 25'		Valērijs Šabala 27'	Stadium: Stadion Lekkoatletyczny COS OPO Cetniewo

12 July 2024	Wisła Płock (Poland)	1–1	(Poland) Lechia Gdańsk	Brześć Kujawski
12:30	Łukasz Sekulski 18'		Tomasz Neugebauer 29' (pen.)	Stadium: Stadion Miejski

==== Winter ====
15 January 2025	Lechia Gdańsk (Poland)	4–2	(Serbia) OFK Beograd	Kadriye, Turkey
13:00	Tomasz Neugebauer 51'; Bohdan Vyunnyk 57', 66'; Tomáš Bobček 83'	Report	Samuel Owusu 7'; Filip Halabrin 55'	Stadium: Megasaray Football Center

18 January 2025	Lechia Gdańsk (Poland)	1–0	(Ukraine) Polissya Zhytomyr	Çakallık, Serik, Turkey
13:05	Tomáš Bobček 90'			Stadium: Titanic Deluxe Golf Belek

21 January 2025	Lechia Gdańsk (Poland)	4–3	(Czech Republic) MFK Karviná	Kadriye, Turkey
13:00	Maksym Khlan 22'; Bujar Pllana 43'; Tomáš Bobček 56', 76'		Kahuan Vinícius 2'; Samuel Šigut 27'; Emmanuel Ayaosi 82'	Stadium: Megasaray Football Center

15 March 2025	Al Ain FC Reserves (United Arab Emirates)	0–1	(Poland) Lechia Gdańsk	Al Ain, United Arab Emirates
13:00			Marcel Bajko 87'	Stadium: Tahnoun bin Mohammed Stadium

== Competitions ==
=== Overall record ===
Competition	First match	Last match	Starting round	Record							
Competition	First match	Last match	Starting round	Pld	W	D	L	GF	GA	GD	Win %
Ekstraklasa	19–21 July 2024	24–25 May 2025	Matchday 1	0	0	0	0	0	0	+0	—
Polish Cup				0	0	0	0	0	0	+0	—
Total				0	0	0	0	0	0	+0	—

Source: Soccerway

=== Ekstraklasa ===
==== League table ====
Pos	Team	Pld	W	D	L	GF	GA	GD	Pts	Qualification or relegation
12	Radomiak Radom	34	11	8	15	48	52	−4	41	
13	Widzew Łódź	34	11	7	16	38	49	−11	40	
14	Lechia Gdańsk	34	10	7	17	44	59	−15	37	
15	Zagłębie Lubin	34	10	6	18	33	51	−18	36	
16	Stal Mielec (R)	34	7	10	17	39	56	−17	31	Relegation to I liga

Source: ekstraklasa.org 90minut.pl
Rules for classification: 1) Points; 2) Head-to-head points; 3) Head-to-head goal difference; 4) Goal difference; 5) Goals scored; 6) Number of wins; 7) Number of away wins; 8) Lower number of points based on yellow and red cards (red card = 3 points, yellow card = 1 point, sending-off = 3 points - including 1 point for first yellow card); 9) Fairplay ranking; 10) Draw.
(Note: Head-to-head record is used only after all the matches between the teams in question have been played)
(R) Relegated

==== Results summary ====
Overall								Home						Away					
Pld	W	D	L	GF	GA	GD	Pts	W	D	L	GF	GA	GD	W	D	L	GF	GA	GD
0	0	0	0	0	0	0	0	0	0	0	0	0	0	0	0	0	0	0	0

==== Results by round ====
Round	1
Ground	
Result	
Position	

A = Away; H = Home; W = Win; D = Draw; L = Loss

==== Matches ====
The schedule for the second round was announced on June 19.
