= 2023–24 Lechia Gdańsk season =

Lechia Gdańsk
2023–24 season
- Manager: Szymon Grabowski
- Stadium: Polsat Plus Arena Gdańsk
- I liga: 1st (promoted)
- Polish Cup: First round
- Top goalscorer: League: Maksym Khlan (10 goals); All: Maksym Khlan (10 goals)
Home colours	Away colours

The 2023–24 Lechia Gdańsk season is the club's 80th season of existence, and their 1st season in the second division of Polish football after suffering relegation during the 2022–23 Ekstraklasa season. The season covers the period from 1 July 2023 to 30 June 2024.

== Players ==
=== First team squad ===
Note: Flags indicate national team as defined under FIFA eligibility rules; some limited exceptions apply. Players may hold more than one non-FIFA nationality.

No.	Pos.	Nation	Player
3	DF	SWE	Elias Olsson (substituted on)
4	DF	ROU	Andrei Chindriș (substituted on)
5	MF	UKR	Ivan Zhelizko (substituted on)
6	MF	POL	Jan Biegański
7	MF	COL	Camilo Mena (substituted on)
8	MF	BIH	Rifet Kapić (on loan from Valmiera) (substituted on)
9	FW	POL	Łukasz Zjawiński
10	FW	ESP	Luis Fernández (substituted on)
11	DF	POL	Dominik Piła
12	GK	SVK	Dušan Kuciak (substituted off)
13	FW	MLI	Bassekou Diabaté (substituted off)
16	MF	AUS	Louis D'Arrigo (substituted on)
20	DF	BRA	Conrado
21	MF	POL	Jakub Sypek (on loan from Widzew Łódź) (substituted on)
22	GK	POL	Bartłomiej Kałduński
23	DF	POL	Miłosz Kałahur (substituted on)
24	DF	POL	Bartosz Brylowski
26	DF	POL	Bartosz Brzęk

No.	Pos.	Nation	Player
27	DF	POL	Dawid Bugaj (on loan from SPAL) (substituted on)
29	GK	UKR	Bohdan Sarnavskyi (substituted on)
30	MF	UKR	Maksym Khlan (substituted on)
30	MF	POL	Miłosz Szczepański (substituted off)
42	MF	POL	Adam Kardaś
43	MF	POL	Mateusz Rzeźnik (substituted off)
45	DF	POL	Marcel Bajko
72	DF	POL	Filip Koperski
77	FW	POL	Bartosz Borkowski (substituted off)
79	FW	POL	Kacper Sezonienko
80	MF	POL	Dominik Lemka
81	GK	POL	Kacper Gutowski
83	GK	POL	Antoni Mikułko
89	FW	SVK	Tomáš Bobček (substituted on)
94	DF	FRA	Loup-Diwan Gueho (on loan from Bastia) (substituted on)
99	MF	POL	Tomasz Neugebauer
—	FW	UKR	Bohdan Vyunnyk (substituted on)
—	DF	AUT	David Stec

Key

Symbol	Meaning
Substituted on	Player arrived at the club during the season.
Substituted off	Player left at any point during the season after making an appearance for the first team.

=== Out on loan ===
Note: Flags indicate national team as defined under FIFA eligibility rules; some limited exceptions apply. Players may hold more than one non-FIFA nationality.

No.	Pos.	Nation	Player
77	FW	POL	Bartosz Borkowski (at Gedania Gdańsk until 30 June 2024)

=== Promoted from academy ===
Note: Flags indicate national team as defined under FIFA eligibility rules; some limited exceptions apply. Players may hold more than one non-FIFA nationality.

No.	Pos.	Nation	Player
24	DF	POL	Bartosz Brylowski (on 20 July 2023)
42	MF	POL	Adam Kardaś (on 20 July 2023)
43	MF	POL	Mateusz Rzeźnik (on 20 July 2023)
45	DF	POL	Marcel Bajko (on 20 July 2023)
77	FW	POL	Bartosz Borkowski (on 20 July 2023)
80	MF	POL	Dominik Lemka (on 21 July 2023)
81	GK	POL	Kacper Gutowski (on 9 December 2023)

=== Transfers ===
==== In ====
No.	Pos.	Player	From	Type	Window	Fee	Date	Source
23	DF	Miłosz Kałahur	Resovia Rzeszów	Transfer	Summer	Free	1 July 2023	
10	FW	Luis Fernández	Wisła Kraków	Transfer	Summer	Free	12 July 2023	
8	MF	Rifet Kapić	Valmiera FC	Loan	Summer	Free	21 July 2023	
21	MF	Jakub Sypek	Widzew Łódź	Loan	Summer	Free	26 July 2023	
29	GK	Bohdan Sarnavskyi	Kryvbas Kryvyi Rih	Transfer	Summer	Free	27 July 2023	
27	DF	Dawid Bugaj	SPAL	Loan	Summer	Free	29 July 2023	
5	MF	Ivan Zhelizko	Valmiera FC	Transfer	Summer	€500k	1 August 2023	
7	MF	Camilo Mena	Valmiera FC	Transfer	Summer	€500k	4 August 2023	
4	DF	Andrei Chindriș	UTA Arad	Transfer	Summer	Free	8 August 2023	
3	DF	Elias Olsson	Kalmar FF	Transfer	Summer	??	8 August 2023	
89	FW	Tomáš Bobček	MFK Ružomberok	Transfer	Summer	€600k	4 September 2023	
30	MF	Maksym Khlan	FC Zorya Luhansk	Transfer	Summer	Free	4 September 2023	
16	MF	Louis D'Arrigo	Adelaide United FC	Transfer	Summer	??	4 September 2023	
94	DF	Loup-Diwan Gueho	SC Bastia	Loan	Winter	Free	8 February 2024	
—	FW	Bohdan Vyunnyk	FC Shakhtar Donetsk	Transfer	Winter	Free	6 March 2024	

==== Out ====
No.	Pos.	Player	To	Type	Window	Fee	Date	Source
11	FW	Omran Haydary	Free Agent	Transfer	Summer	Free	1 July 2023	
33	MF	Marco Terrazzino	Free Agent	Transfer	Summer	Free	1 July 2023	
1	GK	Michał Buchalik	Ruch Chorzów	Transfer	Summer	Free	1 July 2023	
3	DF	Henrik Castegren	IK Sirius	Transfer	Summer	Free	1 July 2023	
4	MF	Kristers Tobers	Grasshoppers	Transfer	Summer	Free	1 July 2023	
9	FW	Łukasz Zwoliński	Raków Częstochowa	Transfer	Summer	Free	1 July 2023	
30	FW	Kevin Friesenbichler	DSV Leoben	Transfer	Summer	Free	1 July 2023	
5	DF	Jakub Bartkowski	Warta Poznań	Transfer	Summer	??	6 July 2023	
6	MF	Jarosław Kubicki	Jagiellonia Białystok	C/T	Summer	Free	5 July 2023	
25	DF	Michał Nalepa	Zagłębie Lubin	C/T	Summer	Free	6 July 2023	
88	MF	Jakub Kałuziński	Antalyaspor	Transfer	Summer	Free	14 July 2023	
7	MF	Maciej Gajos	Persija Jakarta	Transfer	Summer	$90k	14 July 2023	
23	DF	Mario Maloča	Free Agent	C/T	Summer	Free	14 July 2023	
2	DF	Rafał Pietrzak	Free Agent	Transfer	Summer	Free	15 July 2023	
99	MF	İlkay Durmuş	Free Agent	Transfer	Summer	Free	19 July 2023	
8	MF	Joeri De Kamps	Free Agent	Transfer	Summer	Free	30 July 2023	
13	FW	Bassekou Diabate	FK Jerv	Transfer	Summer	Free	19 August 2023	
43	MF	Mateusz Rzeźnik	Lechia Zielona Góra	Transfer	Summer	Free	31 August 2023	
17	DF	Louis Poznański	Free Agent	Transfer	Summer	Free	1 September 2023	
30	MF	Miłosz Szczepański	Piast Gliwice	Transfer	Summer	$50k	1 September 2023	
77	FW	Bartosz Borkowski	Gedania 1922 Gdańsk	Loan	Winter	Free	28 February 2024	
12	GK	Dušan Kuciak	Raków Częstochowa	Loan	Winter	Free	19 April 2024	

== Competitions ==
=== Friendlies ===
==== Summer ====
24 June 2023	Legia Warsaw	3–1	Lechia Gdańsk	Książenice
15:00 CEST (UTC+2)	Carlitos 23'; Josué 28'; Ramil Mustafaev 65'		Kacper Sezonienko 83'	Stadium: Legia Training Center

2 July 2023	Lechia Gdańsk	1–3	Piast Gliwice	Gdańsk
11:30 CEST (UTC+2)	Bartosz Brylowski 45'		Kamil Wilczek 1'; Jorge Félix 26'; Patryk Dziczek 81'	Stadium: Stadion Gdańskiego Ośrodka Sportu

15 July 2023	Lechia Gdańsk	1–1	Stomil Olsztyn	Gdańsk
14:00 CEST (UTC+2)	Bassekou Diabaté 90'		Filip Wójcik 16'	Stadium: Stadion Gdańskiego Ośrodka Sportu

16 November 2023	Lechia Gdańsk	0–2	Ukraine	Gdańsk
16:00 CET (UTC+1)			Oleksandr Pikhalyonok 24'; Yehor Nazaryna 58'	Stadium: Polsat Plus Arena Gdańsk

==== Winter ====
13 January 2024	Lechia Gdańsk	2–3	Chojniczanka Chojnice	Gdańsk
11:00 CET (UTC+1)	Łukasz Zjawiński 22'; Tomáš Bobček 49'		Wojciech Szumilas 16'; Jakub Golinski 64'; Oskar Paprzycki 77'	Stadium: Stadion Gdańskiego Ośrodka Sportu

23 January 2024	Lechia Gdańsk	1–2	FC Drita
14:00 CET (UTC+1)	Dominik Piła 51'		Arb Manaj 4'; Albin Prapashtica 73'

26 January 2024	Lechia Gdańsk	1–0	FC Neftchi Fergana
15:00 CET (UTC+1)	Dawid Bugaj 75'

30 January 2024	Lechia Gdańsk	1–0	FC Kyzylzhar
13:00 CET (UTC+1)	Tomáš Bobček 30'

2 February 2024	Lechia Gdańsk	2–1	Valmiera FC
10:00 CET (UTC+1)	Łukasz Zjawiński 33'; Kacper Sezonienko 40'		Ivan Zhelizko 88' (og)

8 February 2024	Lechia Gdańsk	1–1	FC Shakhtar Donetsk
15:30 CET (UTC+1)	Kacper Sezonienko 78'		Oleksandr Zubkov 65'

23 March 2024	Lechia Gdańsk	5–1	Valmiera FC	Gdańsk
18:30 CET (UTC+1)	Kacper Sezonienko 27'; Łukasz Zjawiński 61'; Jakub Sypek 68', 75'; Camilo Mena 81'		Leo Gaucho 58'	Stadium: Stadion Gdańskiego Ośrodka Sportu

=== I liga ===
==== League table ====
Pos	Team	Pld	W	D	L	GF	GA	GD	Pts	Promotion or Relegation
1	Lechia Gdańsk (C, P)	34	21	5	8	60	34	+26	68	Promotion to Ekstraklasa
2	GKS Katowice (P)	34	18	8	8	68	35	+33	62 (Note: GKS Katowice finished ahead of Arka Gdynia on head-to-head points: Katowice 1–1 Arka Gdynia, Arka Gdynia 0–1 Katowice)	Promotion to Ekstraklasa
3	Arka Gdynia	34	18	8	8	52	34	+18	62	Qualification for promotion play-offs
4	Motor Lublin (O, P)	34	16	8	10	49	42	+7	56	Qualification for promotion play-offs
5	Górnik Łęczna	34	14	13	7	35	29	+6	55	Qualification for promotion play-offs

Source: 1liga.org, 90minut.pl
Rules for classification: 1) Points; 2) Head-to-head points; 3) Head-to-head goal difference; 4) Goal difference; 6) Goals scored; 7) Number of wins; 8) Number of away wins.
(Note: Head-to-head record was used only after all the matches between the teams in question have been played)
(C) Champions; (O) Play-off winner; (P) Promoted
Notes:

22 July 2023 1	Chrobry Głogów	2–4	Lechia Gdańsk	Głogów
15:00 CEST (UTC+2)	Mavroudis Bougaidis 12'; Mateusz Machaj 90+7' (pen.)		Jan Biegański 32'; Luis Fernández 45+3' (pen.), 53', 67' (pen.)	Stadium: Stadion GOS; Attendance: 2,489; Referee: Piotr Urban

28 July 2023 2	Lechia Gdańsk	0–1	Motor Lublin	Gdańsk
20:30 CEST (UTC+2)			Bartosz Wolski 90'	Stadium: Polsat Plus Arena Gdańsk; Attendance: 7,998; Referee: Michał Szczerbowicz

4 August 2023 3	Wisła Płock	1–1	Lechia Gdańsk	Płock
20:30 CEST (UTC+2)	Krzysztof Janus 46'		Luis Fernández 36'	Stadium: Orlen Stadion; Attendance: 4,004; Referee: Leszek Lewandowski

13 August 2023 4	Lechia Gdańsk	1–0	Znicz Pruszków	Gdańsk
12:40 CEST (UTC+2)	Elias Olsson 28'			Stadium: Polsat Plus Arena Gdańsk; Attendance: 8,941; Referee: Wojciech Myć

20 August 2023 5	Resovia Rzeszów	2–0	Lechia Gdańsk	Rzeszów
18:00 CEST (UTC+2)	Radosław Kanach 23'; Maciej Górski 28'			Stadium: Stadion Miejski w Rzeszowie; Attendance: 3,286; Referee: Mateusz Jenda

25 August 2023 6	Lechia Gdańsk	3–0	Podbeskidzie Bielsko-Biała	Gdańsk
20:30 CEST (UTC+2)	Dominik Piła 42'; Camilo Mena 82'; Łukasz Zjawiński 90'			Stadium: Polsat Plus Arena Gdańsk; Attendance: 7,136; Referee: Grzegorz Kawałko

3 September 2023 7	Zagłębie Sosnowiec	5–2	Lechia Gdańsk	Sosnowiec
12:40 CEST (UTC+2)	Joel Valencia 17'; Meik Karwot 45+4'; Kamil Biliński 49'; Adrian Troć 88'; Marek Fábry 90+2'		Ivan Zhelizko 76'; Mateusz Machała 79' (o.g.)	Stadium: ArcelorMittal Park; Attendance: 7,097; Referee: Sebastian Krasny

16 September 2023 8	Odra Opole	0–0	Lechia Gdańsk	Opole
20:00 CEST (UTC+2)				Stadium: Stadion Miejski „Odra” Attendance: 2,940; Referee: Karol Arys

22 September 2023 9	Lechia Gdańsk	5–1	GKS Katowice	Gdańsk
20:30 CEST (UTC+2)	Luis Fernández 9', 55'; Tomáš Bobček 65', 84'; Elias Olsson 77'		Sebastian Bergier 13'	Stadium: Polsat Plus Arena Gdańsk; Attendance: 1,171; Referee: Marcin Kochanek

1 October 2023 10	Bruk-Bet Termalica Nieciecza	0–0	Lechia Gdańsk	Nieciecza
15:00 CEST (UTC+2)				Stadium: Stadion Sportowy Bruk-Bet Termalica; Attendance: 2,246; Referee: Piotr Urban

6 October 2023 11	Lechia Gdańsk	1–1	Górnik Łęczna	Gdańsk
20:30 CEST (UTC+2)	Tomasz Neugebauer 90'		Karol Podliński 34'	Stadium: Polsat Plus Arena Gdańsk; Attendance: 6,383; Referee: Patryk Gryckiewicz

28 October 2023 13	Lechia Gdańsk	2–1	Stal Rzeszów	Gdańsk
15:00 CEST (UTC+2)	Maksym Khlan 35'; Tomasz Neugebauer 85'		Adler Da Silva 78'	Stadium: Polsat Plus Arena Gdańsk; Attendance: 5,579; Referee: Piotr Urban

31 October 2023 12	Polonia Warsaw	0–1	Lechia Gdańsk	Warsaw
18:00 CET (UTC+1)			Tomáš Bobček 8'	Stadium: Stadion Miejski im. gen. Kazimierza Sosnkowskiego; Referee: Marcin Kochanek

5 November 2023 14	GKS Tychy	1–3	Lechia Gdańsk	Tychy
12:40 CET (UTC+1)	Bartosz Śpiączka 52'		Maksym Khlan 24'; Rifet Kapić 54'; Tomáš Bobček 61'	Stadium: Stadion Miejski; Attendance: 3,792; Referee: Damian Sylwestrzak

10 November 2023 15	Lechia Gdańsk	0–0	Wisła Kraków	Gdańsk
20:30 CET (UTC+1)				Stadium: Polsat Plus Arena Gdańsk; Attendance: 12,003; Referee: Łukasz Kuźma

24 November 2023 16	Arka Gdynia	1–0	Lechia Gdańsk	Gdynia
20:30 CET (UTC+1)	Michał Marcjanik 54' (pen.)			Stadium: Stadion Miejski; Attendance: 11,478; Referee: Szymon Marciniak

9 December 2023 18	Lechia Gdańsk	1–0	Chrobry Głogów	Gdańsk
17:30 CET (UTC+1)	Tomáš Bobček 34'			Stadium: Polsat Plus Arena Gdańsk; Attendance: 4,350; Referee: Sylwester Rasmus

12 December 2023 17	Lechia Gdańsk	2–0	Miedź Legnica	Gdańsk
12:40 CET (UTC+1)	Tomasz Neugebauer 41'; Dominik Piła 90'			Stadium: Polsat Plus Arena Gdańsk; Attendance: 4,769; Referee: Krzysztof Jakubik

16 December 2023 19	Motor Lublin	1–0	Lechia Gdańsk	Lublin
20:00 CET (UTC+1)	Michał Krol 68'			Stadium: Arena Lublin; Attendance: 5,484; Referee: Szymon Marciniak

17 February 2024 20	Lechia Gdańsk	3–1	Wisła Płock	Gdańsk
20:00 CET (UTC+1)	Tomáš Bobček 15'; Maksym Khlan 30'; Camilo Mena 61'			Stadium: Polsat Plus Arena Gdańsk; Attendance: 1,805; Referee: Piotr Urban

25 February 2024 21	Znicz Pruszków	0–2	Lechia Gdańsk	Pruszków
15:00 CET (UTC+1)	Maksym Khlan 34', 51'			Stadium: Stadion Znicza Pruszków; Attendance: 1,672; Referee: Sebastian Jarzębak

4 March 2024 22	Lechia Gdańsk	4–0	Resovia	Gdańsk
18:00 CET (UTC+1)	Maksym Khlan 5'; Tomasz Neugebauer 20'; Rafał Mikulec 25' (o.g.); Camilo Mena 45'			Stadium: Polsat Plus Arena Gdańsk; Attendance: 6,114; Referee: Wojciech Myć

10 March 2024 23	Podbeskidzie Bielsko-Biała	1–2	Lechia Gdańsk	Bielsko-Biała
12:40 CET (UTC+1)	Bartosz Bida 14'		Ivan Zhelizko 52'; Kacper Sezonienko 79'	Stadium: Stadion Miejski; Attendance: 3,004; Referee: Sebastian Krasny

15 March 2024 24	Lechia Gdańsk	4–0	Zagłębie Sosnowiec	Gdańsk
15:00 CET (UTC+1)	Tomasz Neugebauer 27'; Camilo Mena 51'; William Rémy 59' (o.g.); Łukasz Zjawiński 90'			Stadium: Polsat Plus Arena Gdańsk; Attendance: 8,432; Referee: Piotr Rzucidło

2 April 2024 25	Lechia Gdańsk	2–1	Odra Opole	Gdańsk
20:30 CEST (UTC+2)	Rifet Kapić 45'; Tomáš Bobček 53'		Rafał Niziołek 26' (pen.)	Stadium: Polsat Plus Arena Gdańsk; Attendance: 8,524; Referee: Patryk Gryckiewicz

7 April 2024 26	GKS Katowice	1–0	Lechia Gdańsk	Katowice
15:00 CEST (UTC+2)	Märten Kuusk (red card) 74'; Arkadiusz Jędrych 90'			Stadium: GKS Katowice Stadium; Attendance: 5,988; Referee: Tomasz Marciniak

14 April 2024 27	Lechia Gdańsk	3–1	Bruk-Bet Termalica Nieciecza	Gdańsk
12:40 CEST (UTC+2)	Tomáš Bobček 41', 53'; Łukasz Zjawiński 90'		Wiktor Biedrzycki 90' (pen.)	Stadium: Polsat Plus Arena Gdańsk; Attendance: 10,412; Referee: Gregory Kawałko

20 April 2024 28	Górnik Łęczna	0–1	Lechia Gdańsk	Łęczna
17:30 CEST (UTC+2)			Rifet Kapić 84'	Stadium: Łęczna Stadium; Attendance: 2,096; Referee: Paweł Malec

24 April 2024 29	Lechia Gdańsk	1–0	Polonia Warsaw	Gdańsk
20:30 CEST (UTC+2)	Maksym Khlan 11'			Stadium: Polsat Plus Arena Gdańsk; Attendance: 6,292; Referee: Peter Lasyk

27 April 2024 30	Stal Rzeszów	4–2	Lechia Gdańsk	Rzeszów
17:30 CEST (UTC+2)	Andreja Prokić 36'; Jesús Díaz 36'; Karol Łysiak 63', 82' (pen.)		Łukasz Zjawiński 66' (pen.), 90' (pen.)	Stadium: Stal Rzeszów Municipal Stadium; Attendance: 3,718; Referee: Marcin Kochanek

4 May 2024 31	Lechia Gdańsk	3–0	GKS Tychy	Gdańsk
17:30 CEST (UTC+2)	Kacper Sezonienko 13'; Ivan Zhelizko 45'; Maksym Khlan 86'			Stadium: Polsat Plus Arena Gdańsk; Attendance: 12,434; Referee: Tomasz Marciniak

11 May 2024 32	Wisła Kraków	3–4	Lechia Gdańsk	Kraków
17:30 CEST (UTC+2)	Ángel Rodado 19', 89' (pen.); Bartosz Jaroch 43'		Maksym Khlan 32', 71'; Tomasz Neugebauer 45' (pen.), 58' (pen.)	Stadium: Henryk Reyman Municipal Stadium; Attendance: 25,327; Referee: Bartosz Frankowski

19 May 2024 33	Lechia Gdańsk	2–1	Arka Gdynia	Gdańsk
20:30 CEST (UTC+2)	Kacper Sezonienko 14'; Camilo Mena 84'		Alassane Sidibe 36'	Stadium: Polsat Plus Arena Gdańsk; Attendance: 36,483; Referee: Tomasz Kwiatkowski

26 May 2024 34	Miedź Legnica	4–1	Lechia Gdańsk	Legnica
15:00 CEST (UTC+2)	Krzysztof Drzazga 30'; Nemanja Mijušković 56' (pen.); Wiktor Bogacz 60', 64'		Jakub Sypek 2'	Stadium: White Eagle Municipal Stadium; Attendance: 4,086; Referee: Piotr Szypuła

==== Results by round ====
Round	1	2	3	4	5	6	7	8	9	10	11	12	13	14	15	16	17	18	19	20	21	22	23	24	25	26	27	28	29	30	31	32	33	34
Ground	A	H	A	H	A	H	A	A	H	A	H	H	A	A	H	A	H	H	A	H	A	H	A	H	H	A	H	A	H	A	H	A	H	A
Result	W	L	D	W	L	W	L	D	W	D	D	W	W	W	D	L	W	W	L	W	W	W	W	W	W	L	W	W	W	L	W	W	W	L
Position	2	7	8	6	8	7	8	9	8	8	8	9	9	3	3	5	3	2	4	3	3	2	1	1	1	2	1	1	1	1	1	1	1	1
Points	3	3	4	7	7	10	10	11	14	15	16	19	22	25	26	26	29	32	32	35	38	41	44	47	50	50	53	56	59	59	62	65	68	68

A = Away; H = Home; W = Win; D = Draw; L = Loss

=== Polish Cup ===
27 September 2023 First round	Wisła Kraków	2–1 (a.e.t.)	Lechia Gdańsk	Kraków
21:00 CEST (UTC+2)	Dawid Olejarka 21'; Ángel Baena 105'		Luis Fernández 90' (pen.)	Stadium: Stadion Miejski im. Henryka Reymana; Attendance: 10,091; Referee: Jarosław Przybył

== Statistics ==
			League		Polish Cup		Total	
No.	Pos.	Player	Apps	Goals	Apps	Goals	Apps	Goals
3	DF	Elias Olsson	30	2	1	0	31	2
4	DF	Andrei Chindriș	30	0	1	0	31	0
5	MF	Ivan Zhelizko	27	3	1	0	28	3
6	MF	Jan Biegański	14	1	0	0	14	1
7	MF	Camilo Mena	29	5	0	0	29	5
8	MF	Rifet Kapić	32	3	1	0	33	3
9	FW	Łukasz Zjawiński	31	5	1	0	32	5
10	FW	Luis Fernández	13	6	1	1	14	7
11	DF	Dominik Piła	28	2	1	0	29	2
16	MF	Louis D'Arrigo	20	0	1	0	21	0
20	DF	Conrado	10	0	1	0	11	0
21	MF	Jakub Sypek	22	1	1	0	23	1
23	DF	Miłosz Kałahur	28	0	1	0	29	0
26	DF	Bartosz Brzęk	6	0	0	0	6	0
27	DF	Dawid Bugaj	27	0	1	0	28	0
29	GK	Bohdan Sarnavskyi	31	0	0	0	31	0
30	MF	Maksym Khlan	24	10	1	0	25	10
42	MF	Adam Kardaś	2	0	0	0	2	0
72	DF	Filip Koperski	6	0	0	0	6	0
77	FW	Bartosz Borkowski	1	0	0	0	1	0
79	FW	Kacper Sezonienko	25	3	0	0	25	3
83	GK	Antoni Mikułko	3	0	1	0	4	0
89	FW	Tomáš Bobček	24	9	1	0	25	9
94	DF	Loup-Diwan Gueho	9	0	0	0	9	0
99	MF	Tomasz Neugebauer	31	7	1	0	32	7

=== Goalscorers ===
Rank	Player	Goals
1	Maksym Khlan	10
2	Tomáš Bobček	9
3	Luis Fernández	7
3	Tomasz Neugebauer	7
5	Camilo Mena	5
5	Łukasz Zjawiński	5
7	Rifet Kapić	3
7	Kacper Sezonienko	3
7	Ivan Zhelizko	3
10	Elias Olsson	2
10	Dominik Piła	2
12	Jan Biegański	1
12	Jakub Sypek	1
