= Michał Głogowski =

Michał Głogowski may refer to:

- Michał Głogowski (footballer), Polish footballer who plays as a forward
- Michał Głogowski (kickboxer), Polish welterweight kickboxer
