= 2022–23 Lechia Gdańsk season =

Lechia Gdańsk
2022–23 season
- Manager: Tomasz Kaczmarek (– Sep 1); Maciej Kalkowski (Sep 1 – Sep 19); Marcin Kaczmarek (Sep 19 – Mar 21); David Badía (Mar 21 – Jun 14)
- Stadium: Polsat Plus Arena Gdańsk
- Ekstraklasa: 17th
- Polish Cup: Round of 16
- Europa Conference League: Second Qualifying
Home colours	Away colours	Third colours

The 2022–23 Lechia Gdańsk season is the club's 79th season of existence, and their 15th continuous in the top flight of Polish football. The season covers the period from 1 July 2022 to 30 June 2023.

== Players ==
=== First team squad ===
Note: Flags indicate national team as defined under FIFA eligibility rules; some limited exceptions apply. Players may hold more than one non-FIFA nationality.

No.	Pos.	Nation	Player
1	GK	POL	Michał Buchalik
2	DF	POL	Rafał Pietrzak
3	DF	SWE	Henrik Castegren
4	DF	LVA	Kristers Tobers
5	DF	POL	Jakub Bartkowski (substituted in)
6	MF	POL	Jarosław Kubicki
7	MF	POL	Maciej Gajos
8	MF	NED	Joeri de Kamps (substituted in)
9	FW	POL	Łukasz Zwoliński
10	FW	MLI	Bassekou Diabaté
11	MF	POL	Dominik Piła
12	GK	SVK	Dušan Kuciak
17	MF	GER	Christian Clemens (substituted off)
17	DF	GER	Louis Poznański (substituted in)
20	DF	BRA	Conrado
23	DF	CRO	Mario Maloča

No.	Pos.	Nation	Player
25	DF	POL	Michał Nalepa
26	DF	POL	Bartosz Brzęk
27	FW	POL	Łukasz Zjawiński (substituted off)
28	FW	POR	Flávio Paixão
29	DF	AUT	David Stec
30	FW	AUT	Kevin Friesenbichler (substituted in)
33	MF	GER	Marco Terrazzino
45	FW	POL	Krystian Okoniewski (substituted off)
69	MF	POL	Jan Biegański (substituted off)
72	DF	POL	Filip Koperski
75	GK	POL	Bartłomiej Kałduński
77	MF	POL	Tomasz Neugebauer (substituted off)
79	FW	POL	Kacper Sezonienko
83	GK	POL	Antoni Mikułko (substituted off)
88	MF	POL	Jakub Kałuziński
97	DF	ISR	Joel Abu Hanna (substituted in)
99	MF	TUR	İlkay Durmuş

Key

Symbol	Meaning
Substituted in	Player arrived at the club during the season.
Substituted off	Player left at any point during the season after making an appearance for the first team.

=== Out on loan ===
Note: Flags indicate national team as defined under FIFA eligibility rules; some limited exceptions apply. Players may hold more than one non-FIFA nationality.

No.	Pos.	Nation	Player
11	FW	AFG	Omran Haydary (at Arka Gdynia from 6 July 2022 until 30 June 2023)
27	FW	POL	Łukasz Zjawiński (at Widzew Łódź 16 August 2022 until 30 June 2023)
69	MF	POL	Jan Biegański (at GKS Tychy from 26 August 2022 until 30 June 2023)
77	MF	POL	Tomasz Neugebauer (at Podbeskidzie from 1 January 2023 until 30 June 2023)
83	GK	POL	Antoni Mikułko (at Wieczysta Kraków from 1 February 2023 until 30 June 2023)

=== Promoted from academy ===
Note: Flags indicate national team as defined under FIFA eligibility rules; some limited exceptions apply. Players may hold more than one non-FIFA nationality.

No.	Pos.	Nation	Player
26	DF	POL	Bartosz Brzęk (on 6 July 2022)
45	FW	POL	Krystian Okoniewski (on 6 July 2022)
75	GK	POL	Bartłomiej Kałduński (on 22 February 2023)

=== Transfers ===
==== In ====
No.	Pos.	Player	From	Type	Window	Fee	Date	Source
11	MF	Dominik Piła	Chrobry Głogów	Transfer	Summer	Free	1 July 2022	
97	DF	Joel Abu Hanna	Legia Warsaw	Loan	Summer	Free	27 August 2022	
8	MF	Joeri de Kamps	SK Slovan Bratislava	Transfer	Summer	?	30 August 2022	
5	DF	Jakub Bartkowski	Pogoń Szczecin	Transfer	Winter	?	2 January 2023	
30	FW	Kevin Friesenbichler	FK RFS	Transfer	Winter	?	11 January 2023	
17	DF	Louis Poznański	PAS Giannina	Transfer	Winter	?	22 February 2023	

==== Out ====
No.	Pos.	Player	To	Type	Window	Fee	Date	Source
36	MF	Tomasz Makowski	Zagłębie Lubin	Transfer	Summer	Free	1 July 2022	
11	FW	Omran Haydary	Arka Gdynia	Loan	Summer	Free	6 July 2022	
22	MF	Joseph Ceesay	Malmö FF	Transfer	Summer	€300k	11 July 2022	
8	MF	Egzon Kryeziu	Górnik Łęczna	Transfer	Summer	Free	13 July 2022	
81	MF	Witan Sulaeman	AS Trenčín	Transfer	Summer	Free	26 July 2022	
77	DF	Rafał Kobryń	Free Agent	C/T	Summer	Free	26 July 2022	
39	GK	Eryk Mirus	Polonia Bytom	Transfer	Summer	Free	4 August 2022	
27	FW	Łukasz Zjawiński	Widzew Łódź	Loan	Summer	Free	16 August 2022	
69	MF	Jan Biegański	GKS Tychy	Loan	Summer	Free	26 August 2022	
77	MF	Tomasz Neugebauer	Podbeskidzie Bielsko-Biała	Loan	Winter	Free	1 January 2023	
17	MF	Christian Clemens	1. FC Düren	C/T	Winter	Free	15 January 2023	
83	GK	Antoni Mikułko	Wieczysta Kraków	Loan	Winter	Free	1 February 2023	
45	FW	Krystian Okoniewski	Radomiak Radom	Transfer	Winter	?	18 February 2023	

== Competitions ==
=== Friendlies ===
==== Summer ====
22 June 2022	Raków Częstochowa	2–1	Lechia Gdańsk	Władysławowo
12:30 CEST (UTC+2)	Valerian Gvilia 14'; Ivi 77' (pen.)		Dominik Piła 69'	Stadium: Stadion Lekkoatletyczny COS OPO Cetniewo

25 June 2022	Lechia Gdańsk	6–3	Wisła Płock	Władysławowo
10:00 CEST (UTC+2)	Christian Clemens 17'; Marco Terrazzino 58'; Flávio Paixão 89', 93'; Rafał Pietrzak 94'; Łukasz Zjawiński 101'		Davo 3', 43'; Łukasz Sekulski 40'	Stadium: Stadion Lekkoatletyczny COS OPO Cetniewo

30 June 2022	Lechia Gdańsk	2–1	Radomiak Radom	Władysławowo
10:00 CEST (UTC+2)	Flávio Paixão 64' (pen.); Bassekou Diabaté 95'		Dominik Sokół 109'	Stadium: Stadion Lekkoatletyczny COS OPO Cetniewo

8 July 2022	Lechia Gdańsk	2–1	Radunia Stężyca	Władysławowo
10:00 CEST (UTC+2)	Christian Clemens 25'; Bassekou Diabaté 40'		Radosław Stępień 87'	Stadium: Stadion Lekkoatletyczny COS OPO Cetniewo

22 September 2022	Lechia Gdańsk	6–0	Gedania 1922 Gdańsk	Gdańsk
16:00 CEST (UTC+2)	Flávio Paixão 15'; Conrado 39'; Filip Tonder 48'; Krystian Okoniewski 56', 63', 65'			Stadium: Gdańsk Sports Center Stadium

==== Winter ====
6 January 2023	Lechia Gdańsk	5–1	Cartusia Kartuzy	Cetniewo
10:00 BST	Mario Maloča 23'; Kacper Sezonienko 26'; Krystian Okoniewski 35'; Łukasz Zwoliński 87', 89'		Michał Nalepa 74 (OG)'	Stadium: COS CPO Cetniewo

11 January 2023	Lechia Gdańsk	0–2	FC Petrolul Ploiești	Belek
12:30 CEST (UTC+2)			Robert Moldoveanu 49', 89'	Stadium: IC Hotels Football Center - Pitch A

15 January 2023	Lechia Gdańsk	1–3	Red Star Belgrade	Belek
14:00 CEST (UTC+2)	Jarosław Kubicki 39'		Osman Bukari 14'; Rafał Pietrzak 71 (OG)'; Kings Kangwa 79'	Stadium: IC Hotels Football Center - Pitch A

19 January 2023	Lechia Gdańsk	0–3	FC Hradec Králové	Belek
12:00 CEST (UTC+2)			Adam Gabriel 10'; Matej Koubek 46', 53'	Stadium: IC Hotels Football Center - Pitch A

=== Ekstraklasa ===
==== League table ====
Pos	Team	Pld	W	D	L	GF	GA	GD	Pts	Qualification or relegation
14	Jagiellonia Białystok	34	9	14	11	48	49	−1	41	
15	Śląsk Wrocław	34	9	11	14	35	48	−13	38	
16	Wisła Płock (R)	34	10	7	17	41	50	−9	37	Relegation to I liga
17	Lechia Gdańsk (R)	34	8	6	20	28	56	−28	30	Relegation to I liga
18	Miedź Legnica (R)	34	4	11	19	33	55	−22	23	Relegation to I liga

Source: ekstraklasa.org
Rules for classification: 1) Points; 2) Head-to-head points; 3) Head-to-head goal difference; 4) Goal difference; 5) Goals scored; 6) Number of wins; 7) Number of away wins; 8) Lower number of points based on yellow and red cards (red card = 3 points, yellow card = 1 point, sending-off = 3 points - including 1 point for first yellow card); 9) Fairplay ranking; 10) Draw. (Note: Head-to-head record is used only after all the matches between the teams in question have been played)
(R) Relegated

17 July 2022 1	Wisła Płock	3–0	Lechia Gdańsk	Płock
14:00 CEST (UTC+2)	Łukasz Sekulski 43'; Davo 76'; Dawid Kocyła 90+1'			Stadium: Stadion im. Kazimierza Górskiego; Referee: Piotr Lasyk

31 July 2022 3	Widzew Łódź	2–3	Lechia Gdańsk	Łódź
19:00 CEST (UTC+2)	Bartłomiej Pawłowski 12' (pen.); Jordi Sánchez 71'		Maciej Gajos 5'; Łukasz Zwoliński 40'; Flávio Paixão 85'	Stadium: Stadion Widzewa; Attendance: 17,202; Referee: Szymon Marciniak

6 August 2022 4	Lechia Gdańsk	0–1	Korona Kielce	Gdańsk
14:00 CEST (UTC+2)			Michał Nalepa 22 (OG)'	Stadium: Polsat Plus Arena Gdańsk; Referee: Łukasz Kużma

14 August 2022 5	Radomiak Radom	4–1	Lechia Gdańsk	Radom
14:00 CEST (UTC+2)	Maurides 4'; Roberto Alves 18'; Filipe Nascimento 55' (pen.); Michał Feliks 76'		Flávio Paixão 26' (pen.)	Stadium: Stadion Lekkoatletyczno-Piłkarski; Referee: Tomasz Musiał

31 August 2022 6	Lechia Gdańsk	0–3	Lech Poznań	Gdańsk
20:30 CEST (UTC+2)			Nika Kvekveskiri 19'; Kristoffer Velde 42'; Michał Skóraś 60'	Stadium: Polsat Plus Arena Gdańsk; Referee: Bartosz Frankowski

27 August 2022 7	Miedź Legnica	2–1	Lechia Gdańsk	Legnica
14:00 CEST (UTC+2)	Santiago Naveda 5'; Luciano Narsingh 46'		Maciej Gajos 47'	Stadium: Stadion im. Orła Białego; Referee: Wojciech Myć

3 September 2022 8	Lechia Gdańsk	0–0	Warta Poznań	Gdańsk
16:30 CEST (UTC+2)				Stadium: Polsat Plus Arena Gdańsk; Referee: Krzysztof Jakubik

10 September 2022 9	Śląsk Wrocław	2–1	Lechia Gdańsk	Wrocław
14:00 CEST (UTC+2)	Erik Expósito 71'; David Stec 90 (OG)'		Patryk Janasik 29 (OG)'	Stadium: Tarczyński Arena Wrocław; Referee: Łukasz Kużma

17 September 2022 10	Lechia Gdańsk	2–2	Jagiellonia Białystok	Gdańsk
14:00 CEST (UTC+2)	Flávio Paixão 52', 73' (pen.)		Marc Gual 3'; Jesús Imaz 55'	Stadium: Polsat Plus Arena Gdańsk; Referee: Malec Pawel

1 October 2022 11	Pogoń Szczecin	2–1	Lechia Gdańsk	Szczecin
19:30 CEST (UTC+2)	Pontus Almqvist 37'; Kamil Grosicki 39'		Maciej Gajos 14'	Stadium: Stadion im. Floriana Krygiera; Referee: Szymon Marciniak

8 October 2022 12	Cracovia	0–1	Lechia Gdańsk	Kraków
19:00 CEST (UTC+2)			Flávio Paixão 84' (pen.)	Stadium: Stadion im. Józefa Piłsudskiego; Attendance: 7,555; Referee: Damian Sylwestrzak

15 October 2022 13	Lechia Gdańsk	0–3	Raków Częstochowa	Gdańsk
14:00 CEST (UTC+2)			Patryk Kun 6'; Bartosz Nowak 21'; Mateusz Wdowiak 47'	Stadium: Polsat Plus Arena Gdańsk; Referee: Jarosław Przybył

24 October 2022 14	Zagłębie Lubin	0–3	Lechia Gdańsk	Lubin
19:30 CEST (UTC+2)			Flávio Paixão 18'; Jarosław Kubicki 67'; Michał Nalepa 78'	Stadium: Stadion Zagłębia Lubin; Attendance: 3,280; Referee: Krzysztof Jakubik

30 October 2022 15	Lechia Gdańsk	1–0	Stal Mielec	Gdańsk
13:00 CEST (UTC+2)	Łukasz Zwoliński 73'			Stadium: Polsat Plus Arena Gdańsk; Attendance: 6,270; Referee: Tomasz Kwiatkowski

4 November 2022 16	Legia Warsaw	2–1	Lechia Gdańsk	Warsaw
19:30 CEST (UTC+2)	Dušan Kuciak 74 (OG)'; Yuri Ribeiro 87'		Łukasz Zwoliński 57'	Stadium: Stadion Wojska Polskiego

13 November 2022 17	Lechia Gdańsk	1–3	Piast Gliwice	Gdańsk
15:00 CET (UTC+1)	Michał Nalepa 86'		Dušan Kuciak 43 (OG)'; Patryk Dziczek 63'; Michał Chrapek 90+7'	Stadium: Polsat Plus Arena Gdańsk; Referee: Bartosz Frankowski

18 November 2022 2	Lechia Gdańsk	2–1	Górnik Zabrze	Gdańsk
19:30 CEST (UTC+2)	Mario Maloča 84'; Łukasz Zwoliński 90+6'		Emil Bergström 45+1'	Stadium: Polsat Plus Arena Gdańsk; Referee: Paweł Raczkowski

29 January 2023 18	Lechia Gdańsk	1–0	Wisła Płock	Gdańsk
16:30 CET (UTC+1)	Łukasz Zwoliński 53'			Stadium: Polsat Plus Arena Gdańsk; Referee: Piotr Lasyk

4 February 2023 19	Górnik Zabrze	1–1	Lechia Gdańsk	Zabrze
16:30 CET (UTC+1)	Szymon Włodarczyk 45+9' (pen.)		Łukasz Zwoliński 71'	Stadium: Stadion im. Ernesta Pohla; Referee: Damian Sylwestrzak

10 February 2023 20	Lechia Gdańsk	0–0	Widzew Łódź	Gdańsk
19:30 CET (UTC+1)				Stadium: Polsat Plus Arena Gdańsk; Referee: Tomasz Kwiatkowski

18 February 2023 21	Korona Kielce	1–0	Lechia Gdańsk	Kielce
14:00 CET (UTC+1)	Ronaldo Deaconu 37'			Stadium: Suzuki Arena; Referee: Bartosz Frankowski

25 February 2023 22	Lechia Gdańsk	1–3	Radomiak Radom	Gdańsk
18:00 CET (UTC+1)	Łukasz Zwoliński 82' (pen.)		Leandro Rocha 21', 52' (pen.); Dawid Abramowicz 41'	Stadium: Polsat Plus Arena Gdańsk

3 March 2023 23	Lech Poznań	5–0	Lechia Gdańsk	Poznań
19:30 CET (UTC+1)	Antonio Milić 25'; Michał Skóraś 44'; Mikael Ishak 67'; Kristoffer Velde 83', 88'			Stadium: Stadion Poznań; Referee: Wojciech Myć

10 March 2023 24	Lechia Gdańsk	4–0	Miedź Legnica	Gdańsk
17:00 CET (UTC+1)	Łukasz Zwoliński 48', 88' (pen.); İlkay Durmuş 75'; Flávio Paixão 90+4'			Stadium: Polsat Plus Arena Gdańsk; Referee: Krzysztof Jakubik

19 March 2023 25	Warta Poznań	2–0	Lechia Gdańsk	Grodzisk Wielkopolski
11:30 CET (UTC+1)	Kajetan Szmyt 26'; Stefan Savić 81'			Stadium: Stadion Dyskobolii Grodzisk Wielkopolski

1 April 2023 26	Lechia Gdańsk	0–0	Śląsk Wrocław	Gdańsk
19:00 CEST (UTC+2)				Stadium: Polsat Plus Arena Gdańsk; Referee: Bartosz Frankowski

10 April 2023 27	Jagiellonia Białystok	1–0	Lechia Gdańsk	Białystok
14:00 CEST (UTC+2)	Taras Romanczuk 84'			Stadium: Stadion Jagiellonii

15 April 2023 28	Lechia Gdańsk	0–1	Pogoń Szczecin	Gdańsk
19:00 CEST (UTC+2)			Joel Abu Hanna 82 (OG)'	Stadium: Polsat Plus Arena Gdańsk

22 April 2023 29	Lechia Gdańsk	1–2	Cracovia	Gdańsk
14:00 CEST (UTC+2)	Jakub Bartkowski 88'		Benjamin Källman 8', 75'	Stadium: Polsat Plus Arena Gdańsk

28 April 2023 30	Raków Częstochowa	4–0	Lechia Gdańsk	Częstochowa
19:30 CEST (UTC+2)				Stadium: Miejski Stadion Piłkarski Raków

6 May 2023 31	Lechia Gdańsk	1–3	Zagłębie Lubin	Gdańsk
19:00 CEST (UTC+2)				Stadium: Polsat Plus Arena Gdańsk

12 May 2023 32	Stal Mielec	0–0	Lechia Gdańsk	Mielec
11:30 CEST (UTC+2)				Stadium: Stadion MOSiR

20 May 2023 33	Lechia Gdańsk	1–0	Legia Warsaw	Gdańsk
19:00 CEST (UTC+2)				Stadium: Polsat Plus Arena Gdańsk

27 May 2023 34	Piast Gliwice	3–0	Lechia Gdańsk	Gliwice
16:30 CEST (UTC+2)				Stadium: Stadion im. Piotra Wieczorka

=== Polish Cup ===
18 October 2022 Round Of 32	Radunia Stężyca	1–4	Lechia Gdańsk	Stężyca
13:00 CEST (UTC+2)	Jakub Letniowski 57'		Jakub Kałuziński 8'; Łukasz Zwoliński 32'; Rafał Pietrzak 50'; Kacper Sezonienko 57'	Stadium: Arena Radunia

8 November 2022 Round of 16	Lechia Gdańsk	2–2 (a.e.t.) (2–4 p)	Legia Warsaw	Gdańsk
19:30 CEST (UTC+2)	İlkay Durmuş 41'; Łukasz Zwoliński 93'		Josué 52' (pen.); Lindsay Rose 117'	Stadium: Polsat Plus Arena Gdańsk

=== Europa Conference League ===
7 July 2022 First qualifying round Leg - 1	(Poland) Lechia Gdańsk	4–1	(North Macedonia) Akademija Pandev	Gdańsk, Poland
19:15 CEST (UTC+2)	Flávio Paixão 17', 39', 66'; Łukasz Zwoliński 25'		Dušan Joković 81'	Stadium: Polsat Plus Arena Gdańsk; Attendance: 14,923; Referee: Nicolas Laforge (Belgium)

14 July 2022 First qualifying round Leg - 2	(North Macedonia) Akademija Pandev	1–2 (2–6 agg.)	(Poland) Lechia Gdańsk	Skopje, North Macedonia
16:00 CEST (UTC+2)	Dimitar Mitrovski 59'		Maciej Gajos 37'; Rafał Pietrzak 82'	Stadium: Petar Miloševski Training Centre; Attendance: 912; Referee: Daniele Chiffi (Italy)

21 July 2022 Second qualifying round Leg - 1	(Austria) Rapid Wien	0–0	(Poland) Lechia Gdańsk	Vienna, Austria
18:00 CEST (UTC+2)				Stadium: Allianz Stadion; Attendance: 12,700; Referee: Elchin Masiyev (Azerbaijan)

28 July 2022 Second qualifying round Leg - 2	(Poland) Lechia Gdańsk	1–2 (1–2 agg.)	(Austria) Rapid Wien	Gdańsk, Poland
18:45 CEST (UTC+2)	Łukasz Zwoliński 82'		Nicolas-Gerrit Kühn 16'; Marco Grüll 18' (pen.)	Stadium: Polsat Plus Arena Gdańsk; Attendance: 23,519; Referee: Alessandro Dudic (Switzerland)

== Statistics ==
			League		Polish Cup		Europe		Total	
No.	Pos.	Player	Apps	Goals	Apps	Goals	Apps	Goals	Apps	Goals
1	GK	Michał Buchalik	5	0	1	0	0	0	6	0
2	DF	Rafał Pietrzak	34	0	2	1	4	1	40	2
3	DF	Henrik Castegren	7	0	1	0	0	0	8	0
4	DF	Kristers Tobers	27	0	1	0	2	0	30	0
5	DF	Jakub Bartkowski	16	1	2	0	0	0	18	1
6	MF	Jarosław Kubicki	31	2	2	0	4	0	37	2
7	MF	Maciej Gajos	29	4	2	0	4	1	35	5
8	MF	Joeri de Kamps	10	0	1	0	0	0	11	0
9	FW	Łukasz Zwoliński	27	9	2	2	4	2	33	13
10	FW	Bassekou Diabaté	23	0	1	0	1	0	25	0
11	MF	Dominik Piła	15	0	1	0	0	0	16	0
12	GK	Dušan Kuciak	30	0	1	0	4	0	35	0
17	MF	Christian Clemens	10	0	0	0	4	0	14	0
20	DF	Conrado	21	0	0	0	4	0	25	0
23	DF	Mario Maloča	27	1	2	0	4	0	33	1
25	DF	Michał Nalepa	23	2	1	0	3	0	27	2
26	DF	Bartosz Brzęk	0	0	0	0	0	0	0	0
27	FW	Łukasz Zjawiński	2	0	0	0	0	0	2	0
28	FW	Flávio Paixão	26	7	1	0	4	3	31	10
29	DF	David Stec	17	0	2	0	4	0	23	0
30	FW	Kevin Friesenbichler	12	0	0	0	0	0	12	0
33	MF	Marco Terrazzino	27	1	0	0	3	0	30	1
69	MF	Jan Biegański	4	0	0	0	1	0	5	0
72	DF	Filip Koperski	7	0	1	0	2	0	10	0
77	MF	Tomasz Neugebauer	2	0	1	0	0	0	3	0
79	FW	Kacper Sezonienko	24	0	1	1	4	0	29	1
83	GK	Antoni Mikułko	0	0	0	0	0	0	0	0
88	MF	Jakub Kałuziński	24	0	2	1	4	0	30	1
97	DF	Joel Abu Hanna	14	0	2	0	0	0	16	0
99	MF	İlkay Durmuş	25	1	2	1	4	0	31	2

=== Goalscorers ===
Rank	Player	Goals
1	Łukasz Zwoliński	13
2	Flávio Paixão	10
3	Maciej Gajos	5
4	İlkay Durmuş	2
4	Jarosław Kubicki	2
4	Michał Nalepa	2
4	Rafał Pietrzak	2
8	Jakub Bartkowski	1
8	Jakub Kałuziński	1
8	Mario Maloča	1
8	Kacper Sezonienko	1
8	Marco Terrazzino	1
