= Dawid Bugaj =

Polish footballer (born 2004)

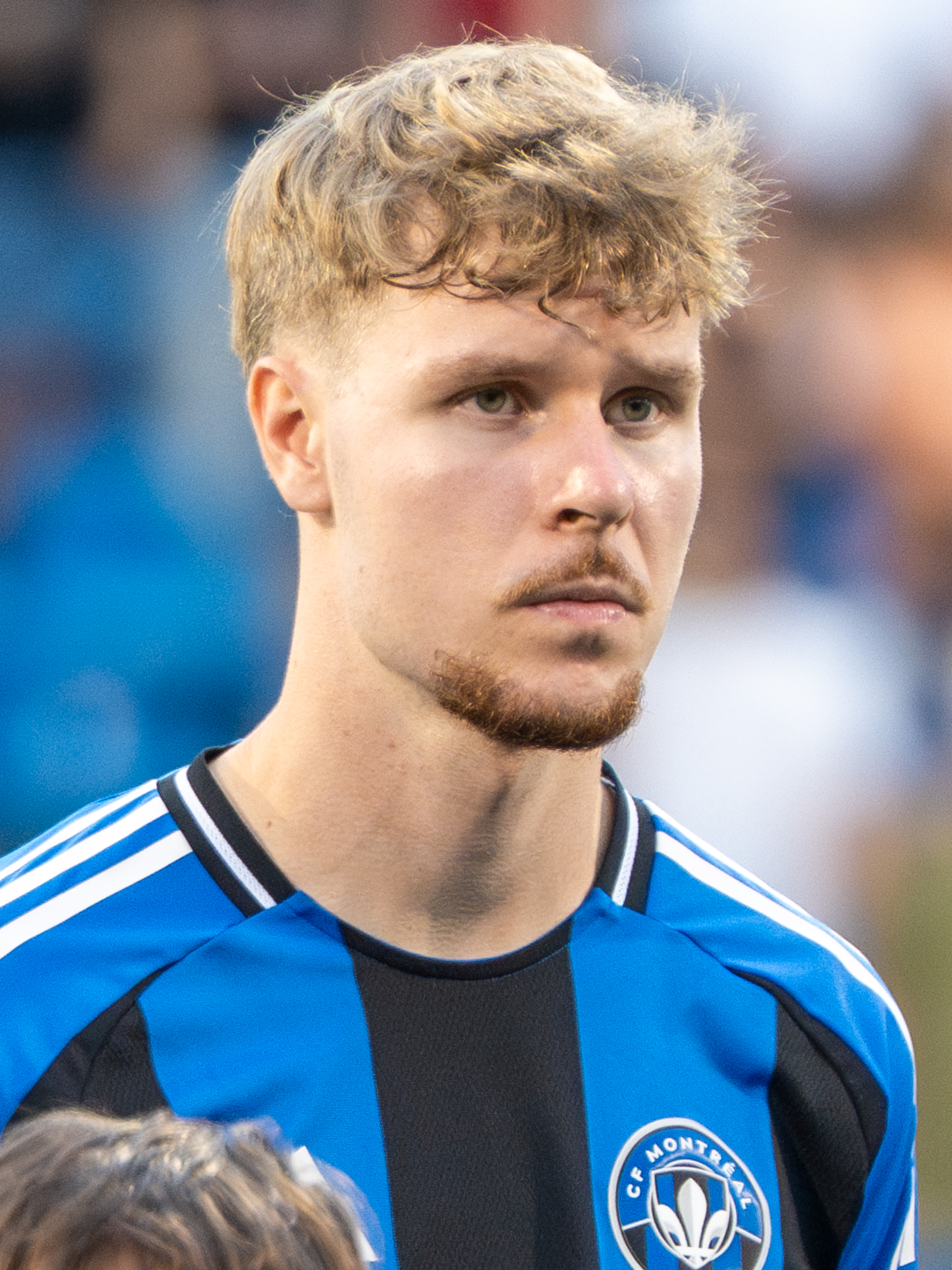
- Bugaj with CF Montréal in 2025

Personal information
- Full name: Dawid Bugaj
- Date of birth: 9 July 2004 (age 22)
- Place of birth: Sosnowiec, Poland
- Height: 1.85 m (6 ft 1 in)
- Position: Right-back

Team information
- Current team: CF Montréal
- Number: 27

Youth career
- –2020: Molde FK
- 2020–2024: SPAL

Senior career*
Years	Team	Apps	(Gls)
2019	Molde FK 2	1	(0)
2023–2024	SPAL	0	(0)
2023–2024	→ Lechia Gdańsk (loan)	27	(0)
2024–	CF Montréal	28	(0)

International career
2019	Poland U15	3	(1)
2019–2020	Poland U16	6	(1)
2022	Poland U18	2	(0)
2022–2023	Poland U19	11	(0)
- * Club domestic league appearances and goals as of 08:04, 22 October 2025 (UTC)

Dawid Bugaj (born 9 July 2004) is a Polish professional footballer who plays as a right-back for Major League Soccer club CF Montréal.

== Career ==
Bugaj started playing football with the youth side of Molde FK. In 2019, Bugaj progressed to the Molde FK 2 team, and made his league debut in a match against Eidsvold TF. Despite the promise shown by Bugaj, he failed to make another appearance for the second team. In 2020, Bugaj had a trial with Borussia Dortmund, however no offer was made by Borussia and he joined SPAL on a permanent contract.

Upon joining SPAL, Bugaj was placed in the club's academy and played with the youth teams for the next three seasons. On 31 July 2023, he joined Polish second-tier club Lechia Gdańsk on loan for the 2023–24 season. Throughout the season, he helped the club win the league and gain automatic promotion back to the Ekstraklasa.

On 16 July 2024, Bugaj moved to Major League Soccer club CF Montréal on a two-and-a-half-year deal, with an option for another two years.

== Personal life ==
He holds dual Polish and Norwegian citizenship.

His father, Radosław, was also a footballer. He spent 10 years playing in Poland, most notably with Zagłębie Sosnowiec where he played in the II liga, Poland's second division at the time. In 2007 when Dawid was 3, his father moved to Norway, settling down in the country after the conclusion of his playing career. His younger brother, Alex, is also a footballer.

== Honours ==
Lechia Gdańsk

- I liga: 2023–24
