= Antoni Mikułko =

Polish footballer

Personal information
- Date of birth: 11 February 2005 (age 21)
- Place of birth: Gdańsk, Poland
- Height: 1.89 m (6 ft 2 in)
- Position: Goalkeeper

Team information
- Current team: Wieczysta Kraków
- Number: 1

Youth career
- 2014–2016: AP Lechia Gdańsk
- 2016–2021: Lechia Gdańsk

Senior career*
Years	Team	Apps	(Gls)
2021–2024	Lechia Gdańsk	3	(0)
2023	→ Wieczysta Kraków (loan)	15	(0)
2024–	Wieczysta Kraków	71	(0)

International career^{‡}
2021	Poland U16	1	(0)
2021–2022	Poland U17	8	(0)
2022–2023	Poland U18	3	(0)
2023	Poland U19	2	(0)
2025–	Poland U20	3	(0)
- * Club domestic league appearances and goals as of 21:36, 31 May 2026 (UTC) ‡ National team caps and goals as of 19:36, 31 March 2026 (UTC)

Antoni Mikułko (born 11 February 2005) is a Polish professional footballer who plays as a goalkeeper for Ekstraklasa club Wieczysta Kraków.

== Club career ==
Mikułko is a youth product of Orlen Gdańsk and Lechia Gdańsk. He started playing football as a left winger before converting to goalkeeper. In 2021, he was promoted to Lechia Gdańsk's senior team and started making appearances on the bench as the backup goalkeeper in the Ekstraklasa. On 27 June 2022, he extended his contract with the club until June 2025. In September 2022, he was named by English newspaper The Guardian as one of the best players born in 2005 worldwide.

On 1 February 2023, he was loaned to III liga side Wieczysta Kraków until June 2024. On 19 May 2023, after establishing himself as Wieczysta's first-choice goalkeeper, it was announced he would be recalled from his loan at the end of the season.

After spending the 2023–24 season as back-up to first-choice goalkeeper Bohdan Sarnavskyi, Mikułko returned to Wieczysta on a permanent basis on 19 June 2024. He signed a two-year contract, with an option for another year.

== International career ==
Mikułko is a youth international for Poland, having played with the Poland U16s, U17s, U18s, U19s and U20s.

== Career statistics ==
As of match played 31 May 2026

Appearances and goals by club, season and competition
Club	Season	League			Polish Cup		Europe		Other		Total	
Club	Season	Division	Apps	Goals	Apps	Goals	Apps	Goals	Apps	Goals	Apps	Goals
Lechia Gdańsk	2020–21	Ekstraklasa	0	0	0	0	—		—		0	0
Lechia Gdańsk	2021–22	Ekstraklasa	0	0	0	0	—		—		0	0
Lechia Gdańsk	2022–23	Ekstraklasa	0	0	0	0	0	0	—		0	0
Lechia Gdańsk	2023–24	I liga	3	0	1	0	—		—		4	0
Lechia Gdańsk	Total		3	0	1	0	0	0	0	0	4	0
Wieczysta Kraków (loan)	2022–23	III liga, gr. IV	15	0	—		—		—		15	0
Wieczysta Kraków	2024–25	II liga	33	0	—		—		2 (Note: Appearances in II liga promotion play-offs)	0	35	0
Wieczysta Kraków	2025–26	I liga	34	0	0	0	—		2 (Note: Appearances in I liga promotion play-offs)	0	36	0
Wieczysta Kraków	Total		67	0	0	0	—		4	0	71	0
Career total			85	0	1	0	0	0	4	0	90	0

== Honours ==
Wieczysta Kraków

- Polish Cup (Lesser Poland regionals): 2022–23

Lechia Gdańsk

- I liga: 2023–24
