= Bartosz Borkowski =

Polish football player (born 2006)

Personal information
- Full name: Bartosz Borkowski
- Date of birth: 4 May 2006 (age 20)
- Place of birth: Gdańsk, Poland
- Height: 1.80 m (5 ft 11 in)
- Position: Forward

Youth career
- 2013–2016: AP Lechia Gdańsk
- 2016–2019: Jaguar Gdańsk
- 2019: Zagłębie Lubin
- 2020–2023: Lechia Gdańsk

Senior career*
Years	Team	Apps	(Gls)
2022	Lechia Gdańsk II	3	(2)
2023–2025	Lechia Gdańsk	1	(0)
2024	→ Gedania Gdańsk (loan)	7	(3)

International career^{‡}
2019	Poland U14	1	(0)
2021–2022	Poland U16	4	(2)
- * Club domestic league appearances and goals as of 10:11, 27 May 2025 (UTC) ‡ National team caps and goals as of 21 November 2023

Bartosz Borkowski (born 4 May 2006) is a Polish professional footballer who plays as a forward.

== Career ==
Born in Gdańsk, Borkowski progressed through a variety of youth teams in the city. He started with AP Lechia Gdańsk, spending three years with the club, before moving to Jaguar Gdańsk for the same amount of time. In 2019, he moved away from Gdańsk, joining Zagłębie Lubin in western Poland, however he only spent 6 months with Zagłębie before returning to Gdańsk and joining the academy of Lechia Gdańsk. During his time in the Lechia academy, he played for the Lechia II team, appearing in three matches and scoring two goals. After the 2021–22 season, the reserves team was disbanded and Borkowski returned to the academy. In March 2023, Borkowski signed his first professional contract and started training with the first team.

Lechia suffered relegation at the end of the season, and many of the teams first teams players left, Borkowski was provided his first appearance for the senior squad during the first game of the 2023–24 campaign. With Lechia not having been able to replace most of their departing players in time for the season opener, Borkowski and three other academy graduates made their professional debuts, with Borkowski coming off the bench on 22 July 2023 against Chrobry Głogów.

On 28 February 2024, Borkowski signed a new contract tying him with Lechia until the end of 2026 and was immediately loaned to III liga side Gedania Gdańsk until the end of the season.
