= Tomasz Neugebauer =

Polish association football player

Personal information
- Full name: Tomasz Neugebauer
- Date of birth: 8 May 2003 (age 23)
- Place of birth: Wodzisław Śląski, Poland
- Height: 1.82 m (6 ft 0 in)
- Position: Midfielder

Team information
- Current team: Lechia Gdańsk
- Number: 99

Youth career
- 2008–2019: Odra Wodzisław Śląski
- 2019–2020: Ruch Chorzów

Senior career*
Years	Team	Apps	(Gls)
2020–2021	Ruch Chorzów	44	(1)
2022–	Lechia Gdańsk	93	(12)
2023	→ Podbeskidzie (loan)	15	(2)

International career
2021	Poland U19	3	(0)
2022–2024	Poland U20	10	(0)
2024	Poland U21	1	(0)
- * Club domestic league appearances and goals as of 08:39, 26 May 2026 (UTC)

Tomasz Neugebauer (born 8 May 2003) is a Polish professional footballer who plays as a midfielder for I liga club Lechia Gdańsk.

== Career ==
=== Early years ===
Neugebauer started his career playing in the youth sides of his local team Odra Centrum Wodzisław Śląski. After more than a decade with Odra, Neugebauer joined the youth sides of Ruch Chorzów. With Ruch, Neugebauer progressed to the first team in 2020, making his debut in the III liga on 8 August against Foto-Higiena Gać. Over an 18-month period, Neugebauer went on to make 44 appearances and score one goal for Ruch.

=== Lechia Gdańsk ===
In December 2021, it was announced that Neugebauer would be joining Ekstraklasa side Lechia Gdańsk on a deal until 2025.

==== Loan to Podbeskidzie ====
On 6 December 2022, I liga side Podbeskidzie Bielsko-Biała announced the acquisition of Neugebauer on loan until the end of the season.

== Career statistics ==
As of match played 23 May 2026

Appearances and goals by club, season and competition
Club	Season	League			Polish Cup		Europe		Other		Total	
Club	Season	Division	Apps	Goals	Apps	Goals	Apps	Goals	Apps	Goals	Apps	Goals
Ruch Chorzów	2020–21	III liga, gr. III	27	1	—		—		—		27	1
Ruch Chorzów	2021–22	II liga	17	0	—		—		—		17	0
Ruch Chorzów	Total		44	1	—		—		—		44	1
Lechia Gdańsk	2021–22	Ekstraklasa	1	0	0	0	—		—		1	0
Lechia Gdańsk	2022–23	Ekstraklasa	2	0	1	0	0	0	—		3	0
Lechia Gdańsk	2023–24	I liga	31	7	1	0	—		—		32	7
Lechia Gdańsk	2024–25	Ekstraklasa	27	2	1	0	—		—		28	2
Lechia Gdańsk	2025–26	Ekstraklasa	32	3	2	0	—		—		34	3
Lechia Gdańsk	Total		93	12	5	0	0	0	—		98	12
Podbeskidzie (loan)	2022–23	I liga	15	2	—		—		—		15	2
Career total			152	15	5	0	0	0	0	0	157	15

== Honours ==
Ruch Chorzów

- III liga, group III: 2020–21
- Polish Cup (Katowice regionals): 2020–21

Lechia Gdańsk

- I liga: 2023–24
