= Camilo Mena =

Colombian footballer (born 2002)

Personal information
- Full name: Camilo Andrés Mena Márquez
- Date of birth: 1 October 2002 (age 24)
- Place of birth: Concordia, Colombia
- Height: 1.75 m (5 ft 9 in)
- Position: Right winger

Team information
- Current team: Korona Kielce (on loan from Lechia Gdańsk)
- Number: 30

Youth career
- 2016: Alianza Platanera
- 2017–2018: Tigres

Senior career*
Years	Team	Apps	(Gls)
2018–2019	Tigres	40	(7)
2020	Deportivo Pereira	13	(0)
2021–2023	Valmiera	63	(16)
2023	→ Jagiellonia (loan)	7	(0)
2023–	Lechia Gdańsk	91	(15)
2026–	→ Korona Kielce (loan)	8	(3)

International career^{‡}
2017	Colombia U15		
2018–2019	Colombia U17		
2026–	Colombia	1	(0)
- * Club domestic league appearances and goals as of 13:16, 7 November 2026 (UTC) ‡ National team caps and goals as of 10:29, 18 November 2026 (UTC)

Camilo Andrés Mena Márquez (born 1 October 2002) is a Colombian professional footballer who plays as a right winger for Ekstraklasa club Korona Kielce, on loan from Lechia Gdańsk, and the Colombia national team.

== Early life ==
Mena was born in Concordia, Magdalena, but was left displaced to Urabá Antioquia due to violence in his hometown.

== Club career ==
=== Youth career and Tigres ===
Mena started his career with Alianza Platanera. After six months with Alianza Platanera, he moved to Bogotá in 2017, joining the academy of Tigres. He made his debut the following year, at the age of fifteen, and made his first start in a 2–1 home loss to Cortuluá. In October 2019, after good performances for Tigres, he was named by English newspaper The Guardian as one of the best footballers born in 2002 worldwide.

=== Deportivo Pereira ===
In December 2019, it was announced that Mena would join Categoría Primera A side Deportivo Pereira for the 2020 season. After a year with Deportivo Pereira, he moved to Latvia to sign for Valmiera. During his time with Valmiera, he was named as the most influential under-20 player in world football, as he had more goals and assists than any other player under the age of twenty. He also led the scoring charts for all players under the age of twenty worldwide, joint with Malaysian player Arif Aiman Hanapi.

==== Loan to Jagiellonia Białystok ====
In February 2023, he joined Polish side Jagiellonia on a six-month loan deal, where he was assigned with a squad number #10. He debuted there on 3 April, in a 87th minute of a 1–1 away draw with Stal Mielec. Mena played seven matches in Jagiellonia over the period of two months before his move to Lechia Gdańsk.

=== Lechia Gdańsk ===
In August 2023, despite Mena's wishes to join the defending Ekstraklasa champions Raków Częstochowa, Valmiera agreed on a deal to sell him to second division side Lechia Gdańsk. On 4 August, Mena signed a four-year contract with the Pomeranian club.

==== Loan to Korona Kielce ====
On 9 September 2026, the transfer deadline day in Poland, Mena moved to Korona Kielce on a one-year loan with an option to buy. He made his debut three days later as a substitute in a 2–1 league win over Śląsk Wrocław.

== International career ==
Mena represented Colombia at the 2017 South American U-15 Championship, scoring once in a 12–0 win over the Czech Republic. He has also represented Colombia at under-17 level.

Mena received his maiden call-up to the Colombia senior team in November 2026, for a set of friendlies against Chile. He made his international debut in a goalless draw on 17 November.

== Career statistics ==
=== Club ===
As of match played 7 November 2026

Appearances and goals by club, season and competition
Club	Season	League			National cup (Note: Includes Copa Colombia, Latvian Cup, Polish Cup)		Continental		Other		Total	
Club	Season	Division	Apps	Goals	Apps	Goals	Apps	Goals	Apps	Goals	Apps	Goals
Tigres	2018	Categoría Primera B	14	0	2	0	0	0	0	0	16	0
Tigres	2019	Categoría Primera B	26	7	3	1	0	0	0	0	29	8
Tigres	Total		40	7	5	1	0	0	0	0	45	8
Deportivo Pereira	2020	Categoría Primera A	13	0	1	0	0	0	0	0	14	0
Valmiera	2021	Virslīga	24	2	2	0	2 (Note: Appearances in UEFA Europa Conference League)	0	0	0	28	2
Valmiera	2022	Virslīga	35	14	2	0	2	0	0	0	39	14
Valmiera	2023	Virslīga	4	0	0	0	3 (Note: Two appearances and one goal in UEFA Champions League, one appearance and two goals in UEFA Europa Conference League)	3	0	0	7	3
Valmiera	Total		63	16	4	0	7	3	0	0	74	19
Jagiellonia (loan)	2022–23	Ekstraklasa	7	0	—		—		—		7	0
Lechia Gdańsk	2023–24	I liga	29	5	0	0	—		—		29	5
Lechia Gdańsk	2024–25	Ekstraklasa	25	4	0	0	—		—		25	4
Lechia Gdańsk	2025–26	Ekstraklasa	31	5	1	0	—		—		32	5
Lechia Gdańsk	2026–27	I liga	6	1	0	0	—		—		6	1
Lechia Gdańsk	Total		91	15	1	0	—		—		92	15
Korona Kielce (loan)	2026–27	Ekstraklasa	8	3	1	0	—		—		9	3
Career total			222	41	12	1	7	3	0	0	241	45

=== International ===
As of match played 17 November 2026

Appearances and goals by national team and year
National team	Year	Apps	Goals
Colombia
Colombia	2026	1	0
Total		1	0

== Honours ==
Valmiera

- Latvian Higher League: 2022

Lechia Gdańsk

- I liga: 2023–24
