= Andrei Chindriș =

Romanian professional footballer

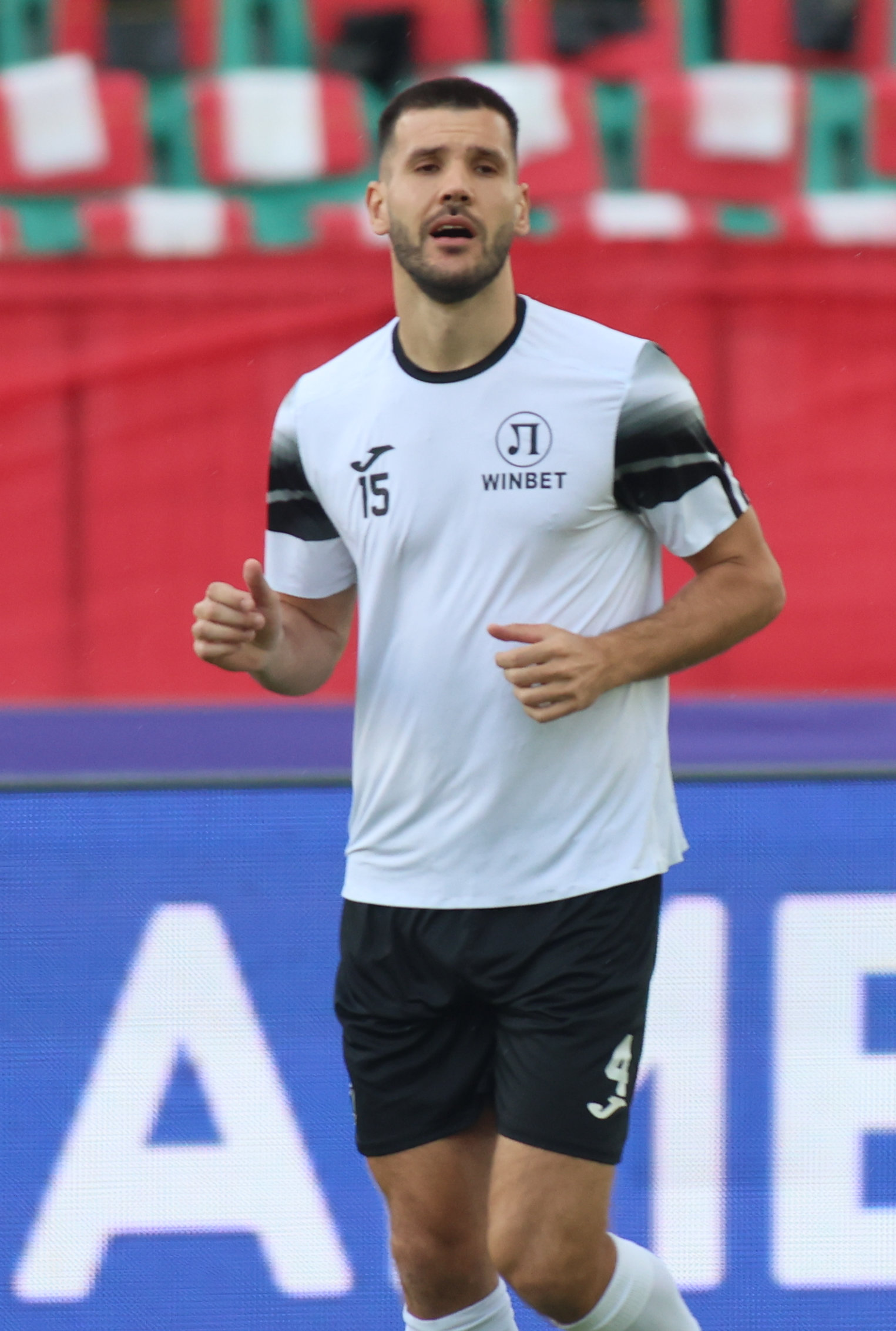

Personal information
- Date of birth: 12 January 1999 (age 27)
- Place of birth: Cluj-Napoca, Romania
- Height: 1.91 m (6 ft 3 in)
- Position: Centre-back

Team information
- Current team: Lokomotiv Plovdiv
- Number: 4

Youth career
- 2011–2013: Peñas Sariñena
- 2013–2016: Universitatea Cluj

Senior career*
| Years | Team | Apps | (Gls) |
| 2016–2021 | Botoșani | 85 | (5) |
| 2016–2017 | → Academica Clinceni (loan) | 7 | (0) |
| 2017–2018 | → Știința Miroslava (loan) | 29 | (1) |
| 2021 | Santa Clara | 0 | (0) |
| 2022–2023 | UTA Arad | 22 | (0) |
| 2023–2025 | Lechia Gdańsk | 36 | (0) |
| 2025– | Lokomotiv Plovdiv | 32 | (0) |

International career
| 2016 | Romania U17 | 1 | (0) |
| 2016 | Romania U18 | 6 | (0) |
| 2019–2021 | Romania U21 | 7 | (0) |
| 2021 | Romania Olympic | 1 | (0) |
- * Club domestic league appearances and goals as of 20 November 2026

Andrei Chindriș (born 12 January 1999) is a Romanian professional footballer who plays as a centre-back for Bulgarian First League club Lokomotiv Plovdiv.

== Club career ==
On 25 November 2016, top flight side Botoșani announced the signing of Chindriș from the academy of Universitatea Cluj. He was loaned out to Academica Clinceni at the start of the following year, and for the 2017–18 season joined Știința Miroslava also on loan, with both teams competing in the Liga II.

Chindriș amassed eleven Liga I games in the first campaign upon his return in Botoșani, after which he became a regular starter at the club. In August 2021, he transferred to Santa Clara in Portugal for an undisclosed fee. He made his debut on 26 October by opening a 3–1 victory over Porto in the League Cup third round.

After returning to Romania to join UTA Arad for the 2022–23 season, on 8 August 2023 Chindriș moved to Polish second division side Lechia Gdańsk on a four-year deal. On 23 June 2025, he left the club by mutual consent.

On 12 September 2025, Chindriș signed a two-year contract with the Bulgarian side Lokomotiv Plovdiv.

== International career ==
Chindriș was called up by manager Adrian Mutu for the 2021 UEFA European Under-21 Championship, but did not play in any match as Romania failed to progress from the group stage. Also during that year, he represented Romania under-23 at the 2020 Summer Olympics in Japan. Chindriș made one appearance in a final goalless draw with New Zealand, which resulted in another group-stage exit.

== Career statistics ==
As of match played 20 November 2026

Appearances and goals by club, season and competition
| Club | Season | League | | | National cup (Note: Includes Cupa României, Polish Cup, Bulgarian Cup) | | League cup (Note: Includes Taça da Liga) | | Continental | | Other | | Total | |
| Club | Season | Division | Apps | Goals | Apps | Goals | Apps | Goals | Apps | Goals | Apps | Goals | Apps | Goals |
|---|---|---|---|---|---|---|---|---|---|---|---|---|---|---|
| Botoșani | 2018–19 | Liga I | 11 | 0 | 1 | 0 | — | | — | | — | | 12 | 0 |
| Botoșani | 2019–20 | Liga I | 33 | 1 | 2 | 0 | — | | — | | — | | 35 | 1 |
| Botoșani | 2020–21 | Liga I | 36 | 3 | 1 | 0 | — | | 2 (Note: Appearances in UEFA Europa League) | 0 | — | | 39 | 3 |
| Botoșani | 2021–22 | Liga I | 5 | 1 | 0 | 0 | — | | — | | — | | 5 | 1 |
| Botoșani | Total | | 85 | 5 | 4 | 0 | — | | 2 | 0 | — | | 91 | 5 |
| Academica Clinceni (loan) | 2016–17 | Liga II | 7 | 0 | 0 | 0 | — | | — | | — | | 7 | 0 |
| Știința Miroslava (loan) | 2017–18 | Liga II | 29 | 1 | 1 | 0 | — | | — | | — | | 30 | 1 |
| Santa Clara | 2021–22 | Primeira Liga | 0 | 0 | 0 | 0 | 1 | 1 | 0 | 0 | — | | 1 | 1 |
| UTA Arad | 2022–23 | Liga I | 22 | 0 | 2 | 0 | — | | — | | 2 (Note: All appearances in Liga I promotion/relegation play-offs) | 2 | 26 | 2 |
| Lechia Gdańsk | 2023–24 | I liga | 30 | 0 | 1 | 0 | — | | — | | — | | 31 | 0 |
| Lechia Gdańsk | 2024–25 | Ekstraklasa | 6 | 0 | 1 | 0 | — | | — | | — | | 7 | 0 |
| Lechia Gdańsk | Total | | 36 | 0 | 2 | 0 | — | | — | | — | | 38 | 0 |
| Lokomotiv Plovdiv | 2025–26 | First League | 19 | 0 | 6 | 0 | — | | — | | 1 (Note: Appearances in Bulgarian First League European play-offs) | 0 | 26 | 0 |
| Lokomotiv Plovdiv | 2026–27 | First League | 13 | 0 | 0 | 0 | — | | — | | — | | 13 | 0 |
| Lokomotiv Plovdiv | Total | | 32 | 0 | 6 | 0 | — | | — | | 1 | 0 | 39 | 0 |
| Career total | | | 210 | 6 | 15 | 0 | 1 | 1 | 2 | 0 | 3 | 2 | 231 | 9 |

== Honours ==
Lechia Gdańsk

- I liga: 2023–24

Lokomotiv Plovdiv

- Bulgarian Cup runner-up: 2025–26
