= Szymon Weirauch =

Polish footballer (born 2004)

Personal information
- Date of birth: 5 March 2004 (age 22)
- Place of birth: Wałbrzych, Poland
- Height: 1.93 m (6 ft 4 in)
- Position: Goalkeeper

Team information
- Current team: Lechia Gdańsk
- Number: 22

Youth career
- –2016: Górnik Wałbrzych
- 2016–2020: Zagłębie Lubin

Senior career*
Years	Team	Apps	(Gls)
2020–2024	Zagłębie Lubin II	49	(0)
2023–2024	Zagłębie Lubin	8	(0)
2024–	Lechia Gdańsk	29	(0)

International career
2022	Poland U18	1	(0)
- * Club domestic league appearances and goals as of 08:41, 26 May 2026 (UTC)

Szymon Weirauch (born 5 March 2004) is a Polish professional footballer who plays as a goalkeeper for I liga club Lechia Gdańsk.

== Career ==
=== Zagłębie Lubin ===
Weirauch debuted for Zagłębie's second team on 24 October 2020, in a 1–0 victory over Lechia Zielona Góra. He made his debut in Ekstraklasa almost three years later, on 23 July 2023, in a 2–1 win over Ruch Chorzów. During the 2023–24 season, Weirauch played 26 matches, from which nine were played in the main team.

=== Lechia Gdańsk ===
On 19 June 2024, his transfer to fellow top-flight side Lechia Gdańsk was announced, for a reported transfer fee of 1 million PLN (approx. €230,000). After signing a five-year deal, he was assigned squad number 1. Weirauch made his first competitive appearance for Lechia on 23 August 2024 in a 1–2 home loss to Raków Częstochowa.

== Career statistics ==
As of match played 23 May 2026

Appearances and goals by club, season and competition
Club	Season	League			Polish Cup		Europe		Other		Total	
Club	Season	Division	Apps	Goals	Apps	Goals	Apps	Goals	Apps	Goals	Apps	Goals
Zagłębie Lubin II	2020–21	III liga, gr. III	4	0	—		—		—		4	0
Zagłębie Lubin II	2021–22	III liga, gr. III	16	0	—		—		—		16	0
Zagłębie Lubin II	2022–23	II liga	12	0	—		—		—		12	0
Zagłębie Lubin II	2023–24	II liga	17	0	0	0	—		—		17	0
Zagłębie Lubin II	Total		49	0	0	0	—		—		49	0
Zagłębie Lubin	2023–24	Ekstraklasa	8	0	1	0	—		—		9	0
Lechia Gdańsk	2024–25	Ekstraklasa	20	0	0	0	—		—		20	0
Lechia Gdańsk	2025–26	Ekstraklasa	9	0	0	0	—		—		9	0
Lechia Gdańsk	Total		29	0	0	0	—		—		29	0
Career total			86	0	1	0	0	0	0	0	87	0

== Honours ==
Zagłębie Lubin II

- III liga, group III: 2021–22
- Polish Cup (Legnica regionals): 2020–21, 2021–22

Individual

- Ekstraklasa Young Player of the Month: September 2024
