= Tomáš Bobček =

Slovak footballer

Personal information
- Date of birth: 8 September 2001 (age 25)
- Place of birth: Ružomberok, Slovakia
- Height: 1.87 m (6 ft 2 in)
- Position: Forward

Team information
- Current team: Frosinone
- Number: 89

Youth career
- 2009–2012: ŠK Lúčky - kúpele
- 2012–2018: Ružomberok

Senior career*
Years	Team	Apps	(Gls)
2019	Ružomberok B	9	(2)
2019−2023	Ružomberok	75	(12)
2023−2026	Lechia Gdańsk	70	(36)
2026−	Frosinone	1	(0)

International career^{‡}
2017	Slovakia U16	1	(0)
2017	Slovakia U17	5	(0)
2019	Slovakia U18	5	(0)
2019	Slovakia U19	8	(1)
2022	Slovakia U21	3	(0)
2025–	Slovakia	4	(1)
- * Club domestic league appearances and goals as of 20:00, 12 September 2026 (UTC) ‡ National team caps and goals as of 14:30, 15 November 2026 (UTC)

Tomáš Bobček (born 8 September 2001) is a Slovak professional footballer who plays as a forward for Serie A club Frosinone and the Slovakia national team.

== Club career ==
=== MFK Ružomberok ===
Bobček made his Fortuna Liga debut for Ružomberok against Zemplín Michalovce on 2 March 2019. The match concluded in a goalless draw, with Bobček replacing Ismar Tandir in the 68th minute in an attempt to break the deadlock.

=== Lechia Gdańsk ===
On 4 September 2023, Polish second division side Lechia Gdańsk announced the signing of Bobček on a four-year contract. He scored his first goals for the club later the same month, scoring twice in a 5–1 victory against GKS Katowice. He was Ekstraklasa Player of the Month in November 2025. Bobček finished the 2025–26 season as Ekstraklasa's top scorer with 20 goals, as Lechia suffered relegation back to the I liga.

=== Frosinone ===
On 28 August 2026, Bobček moved to Italian side Frosinone on a five-year contract. The initial transfer fee was reported at €10.8 million, with up to €2.2 million in potential add-ons. The move made him Frosinone's record signing, and the most expensive player signed from a Polish club.

== International career ==
Bobček was first recognised in a senior national team nomination by head coach Štefan Tarkovič on 23 May 2022, as an alternate ahead of four UEFA Nations League fixtures against Belarus, Azerbaijan and Kazakhstan. For the same June fixtures, he was also a member of U21 team ahead of a qualifier against Malta and a friendly against Romania. After Tarkovič's dismissal and arrival of Francesco Calzona, Bobček was initially omitted from nominations, even as an alternate, before joining a training camp for national team prospects at NTC Senec in December 2022. Bobček made his national team debut as an 88th minute substitute at the World Cup qualification match against Northern Ireland in November 2025. Entering with just two minutes of the game remaining, he scored in stoppage time with a left-footed finish after a corner, to secure a 1–0 win for Slovakia and guarantee at least a playoff place for his nation.

== Career statistics ==
=== Club ===
As of match played 12 September 2026

Appearances and goals by club, season and competition
Club	Season	League			National cup		Europe		Other		Total	
Club	Season	Division	Apps	Goals	Apps	Goals	Apps	Goals	Apps	Goals	Apps	Goals
Ružomberok B	2018–19	2. Liga	0	0	—		—		—		0	0
Ružomberok B	2019–20	2. Liga	9	2	—		—		—		9	2
Ružomberok B	Total		9	2	—		—		—		9	2
Ružomberok	2018–19	Slovak First Football League	3	0	—		—		—		3	0
Ružomberok	2019–20	Slovak First Football League	18	1	3	2	—		—		21	3
Ružomberok	2020–21	Slovak First Football League	5	0	0	0	1 (Note: Appearances in UEFA Europa League)	0	—		6	0
Ružomberok	2021–22	Slovak First Football League	24	5	2	1	—		—		26	6
Ružomberok	2022–23	Slovak First Football League	23	5	3	1	4 (Note: Appearances in UEFA Conference League)	0	—		30	6
Ružomberok	2023–24	Slovak First Football League	1	0	1	0	—		—		2	0
Ružomberok	Total		74	11	9	4	5	0	—		88	15
Lechia Gdańsk	2023–24	Ekstraklasa	24	9	1	0	—		—		25	9
Lechia Gdańsk	2024–25	Ekstraklasa	16	7	0	0	—		—		16	7
Lechia Gdańsk	2025–26	Ekstraklasa	30	20	3	1	—		—		33	21
Lechia Gdańsk	Total		70	36	4	1	—		—		74	37
Frosinone	2026–27	Serie A	1	0	1	0	—		—		2	0
Career total			154	49	14	5	5	0	0	0	173	54

=== International ===
As of match played 13 November 2026

Appearances and goals by national team and year
National team	Year	Apps	Goals
Slovakia	2025	2	1
Slovakia	2026	2	0
Total		4	1

Scores and results list Slovakia's goal tally first, score column indicates score after each Bobček goal.

List of international goals scored by Tomáš Bobček
No.	Date	Venue	Opponent	Score	Result	Competition
1	14 November 2025	Košická futbalová aréna, Košice, Slovakia	Northern Ireland	1–0	1–0	2026 FIFA World Cup qualification

== Honours ==
Lechia Gdańsk

- I liga: 2023–24

Individual

- Slovak Super Liga U-21 Team of the Season: 2021–22
- Ekstraklasa top scorer: 2025–26
