= 2024–25 Sivasspor season =

Sivasspor
2024–25 season
- Manager: Bülent Uygun (until 14 December); Ömer Erdoğan (19 December–5 March)
- Stadium: New Sivas 4 Eylül Stadium
- Süper Lig: 7th
- Turkish Cup: Pre-season
- Top goalscorer: League: Rey Manaj (4); All: Rey Manaj (4)
- Average home league attendance: 5,957
- Biggest win: Adana Demirspor 2–4 Sivasspor

The 2024–25 season is the 58th season in the history of Sivasspor, and the club's eighth consecutive season in Süper Lig. In addition to the domestic league, the team is scheduled to participate in the Turkish Cup.

== Transfers ==
=== In ===
Pos.	Player	Transferred from	Fee	Date	Source
DF	(Serbia) Uroš Radaković	(Turkey) MKE Ankaragücü	Free	9 July 2024	

== Friendlies ==
=== Pre-season ===
17 July 2024 Friendly	Sivasspor (Turkey)	1–2	(Azerbaijan) Neftchi Baku
17:00 UTC+3

20 July 2024 Friendly	İstanbulspor (Turkey)	1–1	(Turkey) Sivasspor

23 July 2024 Friendly	Erzurumspor (Turkey)	0–1	(Turkey) Sivasspor	Erzurum
17:00 UTC+3		Report	Turgunboev 56'	Stadium: Erzurum High Altitude Center

25 July 2024 Friendly	Antalyaspor (Turkey)	0–1	(Turkey) Sivasspor
15:00			Menig 41'

25 July 2024 Friendly	Sivasspor (Turkey)	1–1	(Iran) Sepahan Esfahan
18:00 UTC+3

== Competitions ==
=== Overall record ===
Competition	First match	Last match	Starting round	Record							
Competition	First match	Last match	Starting round	Pld	W	D	L	GF	GA	GD	Win %
Süper Lig	11 August 2024		Matchday 1	10	4	2	4	15	15	+0	40.00
Turkish Cup				0	0	0	0	0	0	+0	—
Total				10	4	2	4	15	15	+0	40.00

Last updated: 25 October 2024
Source: Competitions

=== Süper Lig ===
==== League table ====
Pos	Team	Pld	W	D	L	GF	GA	GD	Pts	Qualification or relegation
15	Antalyaspor	36	12	8	16	37	62	−25	44	
16	Bodrum (R)	36	9	10	17	26	43	−17	37	Relegation to 2025–26 TFF First League
17	Sivasspor (R)	36	9	8	19	44	60	−16	35	Relegation to 2025–26 TFF First League
18	Hatayspor (R)	36	6	8	22	47	74	−27	26	Relegation to 2025–26 TFF First League
19	Adana Demirspor (R)	36	3	5	28	34	92	−58	2 (Note: Adana Demirspor had 12 points deducted.)	Relegation to 2025–26 TFF First League

Source: Süper Lig
Rules for classification: 1) Points; 2) Head-to-head points; 3) Head-to-head goal difference; 4) Head-to-head goals scored; 5) Goal difference; 6) Goals scored; 7) Play-off.
(Note: Head-to-head record is used only after all the matches between the teams in question have been played)
(R) Relegated

==== Results summary ====
Overall								Home						Away					
Pld	W	D	L	GF	GA	GD	Pts	W	D	L	GF	GA	GD	W	D	L	GF	GA	GD
19	5	5	9	21	32	−11	20	3	4	3	12	12	0	2	1	6	9	20	−11

Last updated: 20 January 2025.
Source: Süper Lig

==== Results by round ====
Round	1	2	3	4	5	6	7	8	9	10	11	12	13	14	15	16	17	18	19	20	21	22
Ground	H	A	H	A	H	A	H	A	H	A	H	A	H	A	H	A	H		H	A	H	A
Result	D	W	L	L	W	D	L	L	W	W	W	L	D	L	L	L	D		D	L		
Position	12	7	7	10	8	9	12	13	10	8	6	7	7	9	11	13	14		15	15		

Updated to match(es) played on 20 January 2025. Source: Süper Lig
A = Away; H = Home; W = Win; D = Draw; L = Loss

==== Matches ====
The match schedule was released on 11 July 2024.

11 August 2024 1	Sivasspor	0–0	Trabzonspor	Sivas
20:15 EET	Turgunboev (yellow card) 29'	Report		Stadium: New Sivas 4 Eylül Stadium; Attendance: 7,648; Referee: (Turkey) Cihan Aydın

17 August 2024 2	Kayserispor	1–2	Sivasspor	Kayseri
20:15 EET	Miguel Cardoso 14' (yellow card) 21'	Report	Radaković 17' 50'; Çiftçi (yellow card) 36' (yellow-red card) 74'; Biegański (yellow card) 87'	Stadium: RHG Enertürk Enerji Stadium; Attendance: 8,183; Referee: (Turkey) Turgut Doman

24 August 2024 3	Sivasspor	0–1	Eyüpspor	Sivas
20:15 EET	Camara (yellow card) 71'; Baldé (yellow card) 90'	Report	Kutucu 8' (yellow card) 14'; Kabasakal (yellow card) 90'; Özer (yellow card) 90+2'	Stadium: New Sivas 4 Eylül Stadium; Attendance: 4,682; Referee: (Turkey) Zorbay Küçük

1 September 2024 4	Beşiktaş	2–0	Sivasspor	Istanbul
22:45 EET	Immobile (yellow card) 5' (goal) 27' (pen.); Al-Musrati (yellow card) 59'; Rashica (yellow card) 72'; Gedson Fernandes 89'; Topçu (yellow card) 90+4'	Report	Paluli (yellow card) 41'; Çiftçi (yellow card) 44'; Vural (yellow card) 89'; Manaj (yellow card) 90+4'; Sonko Sundberg (yellow card) 90+5'	Stadium: Tüpraş Stadyumu; Attendance: 30,197; Referee: (Turkey) Direnç Tonusluoğlu

25 October 2024 10	Adana Demirspor	2–4	Sivasspor

2 November 2024 11	Sivasspor	2–1	Rizespor

10 November 2024 12	Fenerbahce	4–0	Sivasspor

24 November 2024 13	Sivasspor	0–0	Kasimpasa

29 November 2024 14	Antalyaspor	2–1	Sivasspor

8 December 2024 15	Sivasspor	2–3	Galatasaray

13 December 2024 16	Bodrum	2–0	Sivasspor

21 December 2024 17	Sivasspor	0–0	Samsunspor

18	Bye

12 January 2025 19	Sivasspor	1–1	Alanyaspor

20 January 2025 20	Trabzonspor	4–0	Sivasspor

25 January 2025 21	Sivasspor	5–2	Kayserispor

31 January 2025 22	Eyüpspor	1–0	Sivasspor

8 February 2025 23	Sivasspor	0–2	Besiktas

15 February 2025 24	Gaziantep	2–1	Sivasspor

22 February 2025 25	Sivasspor	1–1	Konyaspor

3 March 2025 26	Istanbul Basaksehir	1–0	Sivasspor

9 March 2025 27	Sivasspor	3–1	Göztepe

16 March 2025 28	Hatayspor	3–2	Sivasspor

29 March 2025 29	Sivasspor	5–1	Adana Demirspor

5 April 2025 30	Rizespor	1–1	Sivasspor

13 April 2025 31	Sivasspor	1–3	Fenerbahce

19 April 2025 32	Kasimpasa	v	Sivasspor
