= Dominik Piła =

Polish footballer

Personal information
- Full name: Dominik Piła
- Date of birth: 6 May 2001 (age 25)
- Place of birth: Świdnica, Poland
- Height: 1.87 m (6 ft 2 in)
- Positions: Right-back; left winger

Team information
- Current team: Cracovia
- Number: 79

Youth career
- 2012–2014: Gryf Świdnica
- 2014–2017: Polonia-Stal Świdnica
- 2017–2019: Chrobry Głogów

Senior career*
Years	Team	Apps	(Gls)
2019–2022	Chrobry Głogów	62	(7)
2022–2025	Lechia Gdańsk	77	(3)
2025–	Cracovia	38	(2)

International career
2021–2022	Poland U20	6	(2)
- * Club domestic league appearances and goals as of 16:39, 22 November 2026 (UTC)

Dominik Piła (born 6 May 2001) is a Polish professional footballer who plays as a right-back for Ekstraklasa club Cracovia.

== Club career ==
Piła started his professional career with Polish I liga side Chrobry Głogów in 2019. On 4 January 2022, he signed a four-year contract with Ekstraklasa club Lechia Gdańsk, effective from 1 July 2022. On 14 August 2022, Piła made his debut in the Polish top division in a 4–1 away loss to Radomiak Radom. He scored his first goal for Lechia during a 3–0 I liga home victory over Podbeskidzie Bielsko-Biała on 25 August 2023.

On 16 June 2025, Cracovia announced the signing of Piła on a four-year deal.

== Career statistics ==
As of match played 23 May 2026

Appearances and goals by club, season and competition
Club	Season	League			Polish Cup		Europe		Other		Total	
Club	Season	Division	Apps	Goals	Apps	Goals	Apps	Goals	Apps	Goals	Apps	Goals
Chrobry Głogów	2019–20	I liga	8	1	1	0	—		—		9	1
Chrobry Głogów	2020–21	I liga	19	1	1	0	—		—		20	1
Chrobry Głogów	2021–22	I liga	35	5	1	0	—		—		36	5
Chrobry Głogów	Total		62	7	3	0	—		—		65	7
Lechia Gdańsk	2022–23	Ekstraklasa	15	0	1	0	—		—		16	0
Lechia Gdańsk	2023–24	I liga	28	2	1	0	—		—		29	2
Lechia Gdańsk	2024–25	Ekstraklasa	34	1	1	0	—		—		35	1
Lechia Gdańsk	Total		77	3	3	0	—		—		80	3
Cracovia	2025–26	Ekstraklasa	27	0	2	1	—		—		29	1
Career total			166	10	8	1	0	0	0	0	174	11

== Honours ==
Lechia Gdańsk

- I liga: 2023–24
