= Kacper Sezonienko =

Polish footballer (born 2003)

Personal information
- Full name: Kacper Sezonienko
- Date of birth: 23 March 2003 (age 23)
- Place of birth: Ostróda, Poland
- Height: 1.90 m (6 ft 3 in)
- Position: Forward

Team information
- Current team: Hellas Verona
- Number: 79

Youth career
- 2011–2018: AP Ostróda
- 2018–2019: Lechia Gdańsk

Senior career*
Years	Team	Apps	(Gls)
2019–2022	Lechia Gdańsk II	4	(1)
2020–2026	Lechia Gdańsk	135	(12)
2020–2021	→ Bytovia Bytów (loan)	32	(5)
2026–	Hellas Verona	0	(0)

International career
2020	Poland U17	3	(1)
2022	Poland U20	2	(0)
2024	Poland U21	1	(0)
- * Club domestic league appearances and goals as of 08:37, 26 May 2026 (UTC)

Kacper Sezonienko (born 23 March 2003) is a Polish professional footballer who plays as a forward for Serie B club Hellas Verona.

== Career ==
=== Lechia Gdańsk ===
Sezonienko started playing football with AP Ostróda aged 8, later joining the youth sides of Lechia Gdańsk in 2018. At the age of 16 Sezonienko first played for the Lechia Gdańsk II team, making his debut against Arka Gdynia II. Sezonienko started training with the first team at the beginning of the 2019–20 season. In August 2020 it was announced that he would be spending the season with Bytovia Bytów.

=== Hellas Verona ===
On 31 July 2026, Sezonienko signed a three-year contract with Italian club Hellas Verona.

== Career statistics ==
As of match played 23 May 2026

Appearances and goals by club, season and competition
Club	Season	League			Polish Cup		Europe		Other		Total	
Club	Season	Division	Apps	Goals	Apps	Goals	Apps	Goals	Apps	Goals	Apps	Goals
Lechia Gdańsk II	2018–19	IV liga Pomerania	1	0	—		—		—		1	0
Lechia Gdańsk II	2019–20	IV liga Pomerania	1	0	—		—		—		1	0
Lechia Gdańsk II	2021–22	IV liga Pomerania	2	1	—		—		—		2	1
Lechia Gdańsk II	Total		4	1	—		—		—		4	1
Bytovia Bytów (loan)	2020–21	II liga	32	5	1	0	—		—		33	5
Lechia Gdańsk	2021–22	Ekstraklasa	26	1	2	0	—		—		28	1
Lechia Gdańsk	2022–23	Ekstraklasa	24	0	1	1	4 (Note: Appearances in UEFA Europa Conference League)	0	—		29	1
Lechia Gdańsk	2023–24	I liga	25	3	0	0	—		—		25	3
Lechia Gdańsk	2024–25	Ekstraklasa	29	3	1	0	—		—		30	3
Lechia Gdańsk	2025–26	Ekstraklasa	31	5	3	0	—		—		34	5
Lechia Gdańsk	Total		135	12	7	1	4	0	0	0	146	13
Career total			171	18	8	1	4	0	0	0	183	19

== Honours ==
Lechia Gdańsk

- I liga: 2023–24

Individual

- Ekstraklasa Young Player of the Month: May 2025
