= Olimpia Grudziądz =

Polish football club

- Full name: Grudziądzki Klub Sportowy; Olimpia Grudziądz
- Nickname: Gieksa
- Founded: 30 June 1923; 103 years ago
- Ground: Bronisław Malinowski Central Stadium; Iława Municipal Stadium
- Capacity: 5,323; 1,778
- Chairman: Tomasz Asensky
- Manager: Dawid Pędziałek
- League: II liga
- 2025–26: II liga, 3rd of 18
- Website: www.olimpiagrudziadz.com
Home colours	Away colours

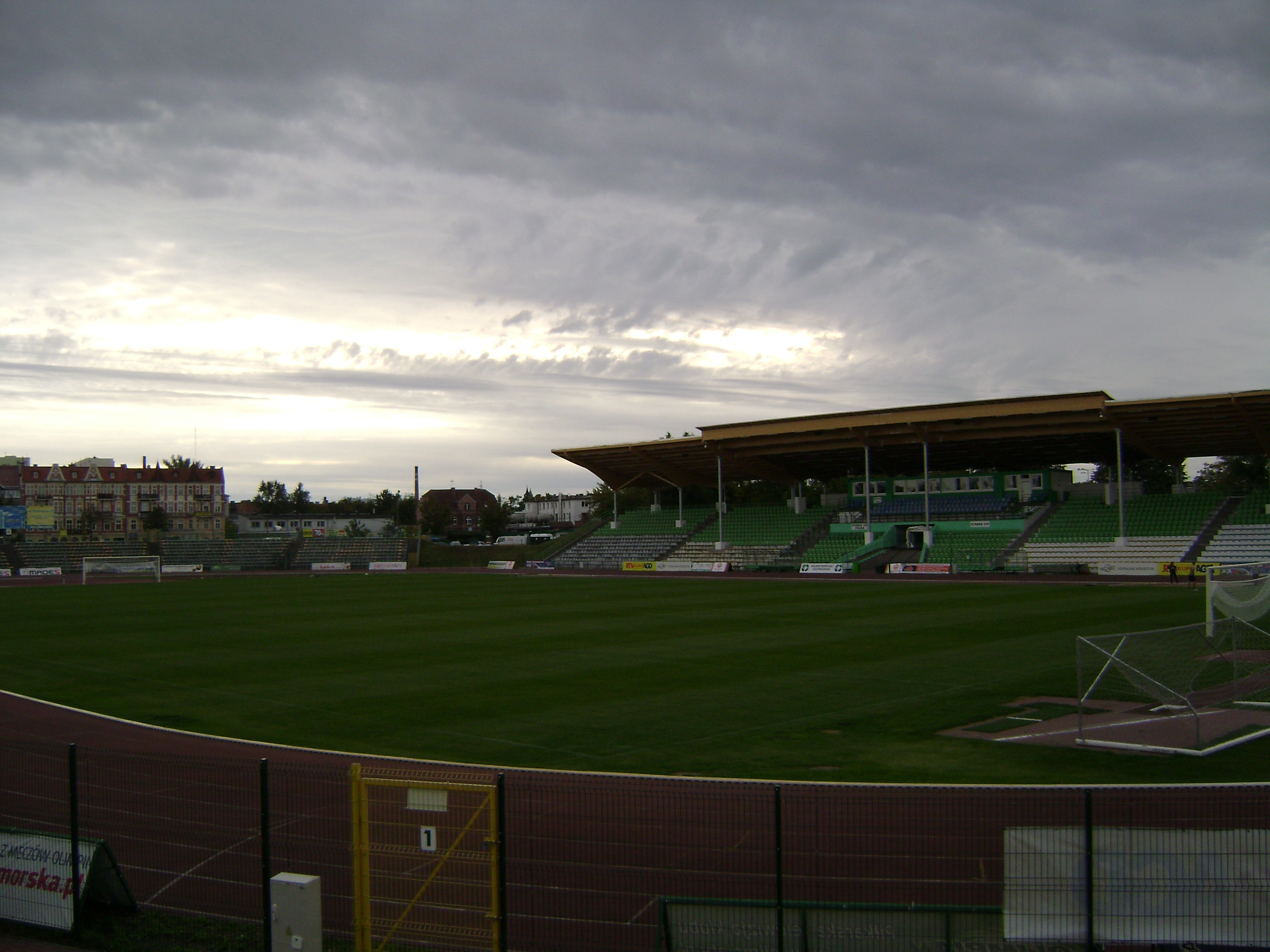
Bronisław Malinowski Central Stadium

Olimpia Grudziądz is a Polish football club based in Grudziądz. The club was formed on 30 June 1923. Currently, Olimpia plays in the II liga, following promotion in the 2022–23 season.

On 1 March 2022, thanks to defeating Wisła Kraków in a penalty shoot-out, Olimpia Grudziądz advanced to the Polish Cup semi-finals, making it the best achievement in the club's history.

== Players ==
=== Current squad ===
As of 14 September 2026

Note: Flags indicate national team as defined under FIFA eligibility rules; some limited exceptions apply. Players may hold more than one non-FIFA nationality.

No.	Pos.	Nation	Player
1	GK	POL	Michał Jerke (on loan from Radomiak Radom)
3	DF	POL	Szymon Michalski
5	DF	POL	Maciej Wichtowski
7	MF	POL	Dawid Olejarka
9	FW	POL	Dawid Bałdyga
10	MF	POL	Kacper Cichoń
11	FW	POL	Filip Wilak
12	GK	POL	Oskar Klat (on loan from Wisła Płock)
13	MF	POL	Hubert Jasiak (on loan from Górnik Zabrze)
14	DF	POL	Bartosz Brzęk
16	MF	POL	Karol Fietz
17	FW	POL	Artur Siemaszko
18	MF	POL	Kacper Jarzec

No.	Pos.	Nation	Player
19	MF	POL	Jakub Stec
20	FW	POL	Alex Kolasa
22	MF	POL	Dennis Jastrzembski
25	DF	POL	Bartosz Zbiciak
29	FW	POL	Wojciech Szafranek
32	DF	POL	Przemysław Stolc
33	DF	POL	Dawid Abramowicz
39	GK	BLR	Egor Budchan
42	DF	POL	Patryk Zabłoński
44	MF	POL	Dominik Frelek (captain)
70	MF	POL	Filip Nowacki
93	DF	UKR	Ivan Tsyupa
99	GK	POL	Jakub Pawlak

=== Out on loan ===
Note: Flags indicate national team as defined under FIFA eligibility rules; some limited exceptions apply. Players may hold more than one non-FIFA nationality.

No.	Pos.	Nation	Player
40	GK	POL	Filip Kondracik (at Cartusia Kartuzy until 30 June 2027)
—	MF	POL	Adam Kardaś (at Czarni Pruszcz Gdański until 30 June 2027)

=== Notable former players ===
Had international caps for Poland (all prior to playing for Olimpia).

- (Poland) Mariusz Pawlak (2009–2011)
- (Poland) Sławomir Wojciechowski (2008–2009)
- (Poland) Marcin Kaczmarek (2014–2019)
