= Karl Wendt =

Swedish footballer (born 2005)

Personal information
- Full name: Karl Wendt
- Date of birth: 5 July 2005 (age 21)
- Place of birth: Malmö, Sweden
- Height: 1.83 m (6 ft 0 in)
- Position: Midfielder

Team information
- Current team: Lechia Gdańsk
- Number: 18

Youth career
- –2021: BK Höllviken
- 2021–2023: Trelleborg

Senior career*
Years	Team	Apps	(Gls)
2023–2024	Trelleborg	17	(0)
2024–	Lechia Gdańsk	13	(1)
2025	→ Trelleborg (loan)	10	(2)
2026	→ Östers IF (loan)	14	(3)
- * Club domestic league appearances and goals as of 21 July 2026

Karl Wendt (born 5 July 2005) is a Swedish professional footballer who plays as a midfielder for I liga club Lechia Gdańsk.

== Career ==
Wendt started his career playing for the youth sides of BK Höllviken and Trelleborg, signing his first professional contracted with Trelleborg. During his time with Trelleborg, Wendt went on to make 17 appearances in the Superettan, Sweden's second tier.

His performances earned him a move to Polish club Lechia Gdańsk on 18 July 2024. He made his Ekstraklasa debut the following day, coming on as a late substitute against Śląsk Wrocław. In his first season with the club, he made a total of 13 league appearances and scored one goal. The following season, Wendt was not initially in the squad's plans, leading him to return to Trelleborg on a short-term loan. Upon his return, he made a further 10 appearances for the club, scoring two goals, but was unable to help Trelleborg from being relegated at the end of the Superettan season.

On 10 March 2026, he was loaned to Sweden again, this time joining Superettan side Östers IF until the end of July.
