= Adam Kardaś =

Polish association football player

Personal information
- Full name: Adam Kardaś
- Date of birth: 23 August 2006 (age 20)
- Place of birth: Poland
- Height: 1.78 m (5 ft 10 in)
- Position: Midfielder

Team information
- Current team: Czarni Pruszcz Gdański (on loan from Olimpia Grudziądz)

Youth career
- 2014–2016: AP Lechia Gdańsk
- 2016–2018: Lechia Gdańsk
- 2018–2019: Jaguar Gdańsk
- 2019–2023: Lechia Gdańsk

Senior career*
Years	Team	Apps	(Gls)
2023–2026	Lechia Gdańsk	3	(0)
2026–	Olimpia Grudziądz	0	(0)
2026–	→ Czarni Pruszcz Gdański (loan)	0	(0)
- * Club domestic league appearances and goals as of 16:00, 2 June 2026 (UTC)

Adam Kardaś (born 23 August 2006) is a Polish professional footballer who plays as a midfielder for IV liga club Czarni Pruszcz Gdański, on loan from Olimpia Grudziądz.

== Career ==
Kardaś started playing football for a variety of youth teams in Gdańsk. He spent 2 years with AP Lechia Gdańsk, a season with Jaguar Gdańsk, and a combined total of 6 years with Lechia Gdańsk over two different spells. In March 2023, Kardaś signed a professional contract with Lechia, and started training with the first team.

Lechia suffered relegation from Ekstraklasa at the end of their 2022–23 campaign, and after many players departed the club without being replaced in time for the season opener, Kardaś and two other academy graduates were given an opportunity to make their professional debuts coming off the bench in a 2–4 away league win against Chrobry Głogów on 22 July 2023.

== Honours ==
Lechia Gdańsk

- I liga: 2023–24
