= Jan Biegański =

Polish footballer (born 2002)

Personal information
- Full name: Jan Marek Biegański
- Date of birth: 4 December 2002 (age 23)
- Place of birth: Gliwice, Poland
- Height: 1.83 m (6 ft 0 in)
- Position: Defensive midfielder

Team information
- Current team: Pogoń Szczecin
- Number: 6

Youth career
- GKS Katowice
- –2015: Silent Dąbrowa Górnicza
- 2015–2018: GKS Tychy

Senior career*
Years	Team	Apps	(Gls)
2018–2020	GKS Tychy	24	(2)
2021–2024	Lechia Gdańsk	45	(1)
2021–2022	Lechia Gdańsk II	4	(0)
2022	→ GKS Tychy (loan)	11	(3)
2023	→ GKS Tychy (loan)	8	(0)
2024–2025	Sivasspor	11	(0)
2025–	Pogoń Szczecin	21	(1)
2026–	Pogoń Szczecin II	1	(0)

International career
2018	Poland U16	5	(2)
2018–2019	Poland U17	11	(1)
2019–2020	Poland U19	2	(0)
2021–2022	Poland U20	7	(1)
2021–2024	Poland U21	13	(0)
- * Club domestic league appearances and goals as of 20:16, 8 September 2026 (UTC)

Jan Marek Biegański (born 4 December 2002) is a Polish professional footballer who plays as a defensive midfielder for Ekstraklasa club Pogoń Szczecin.

== Career ==
=== Early years ===
Biegański started playing football for the youth side of GKS Katowice before joining the academy of Silent Dąbrowa Górnicza. In 2015, Biegański joined GKS Tychy, making his first team debut in a game against Raków Częstochowa during the 2017–18 season, becoming the youngest ever debutant for the club, aged 15. In the match against GKS Katowice the following season, Biegański came off the bench and given the captain's armband, becoming the youngest ever captain for GKS Tychy at the age of 15 years 355 days. Biegański spent three and a half seasons with GKS Tychy in I liga, making a total of 22 league appearances and scoring two goals.

=== Lechia Gdańsk ===
On 1 January 2021, Biegański officially joined Lechia Gdańsk. Unable to gain a regular place in the line-up under manager Tomasz Kaczmarek, on 26 August 2022 he was loaned back to GKS Tychy until the end of the season. Following a successful spell at his previous club and as a youth international, he was recalled on 23 November 2022. On 22 February 2023, the last day of the winter transfer window in Poland, he was yet again sent on loan to GKS until the end of the 2022–23 campaign.

=== Sivasspor ===
On 16 August 2024, Biegański moved to Turkish club Sivasspor on a three-year deal. On 9 July 2025, after Sivasspor's relegation, Biegański terminated his contract by mutual consent.

=== Pogoń Szczecin ===
On 15 July 2025, Biegański signed a two-year contract with Ekstraklasa side Pogoń Szczecin.

== Personal life ==
He is the brother of Aleksander Biegański, who also became a footballer (died 10 January 2025), and Dawid Biegański.

== Career statistics ==
As of match played 23 May 2026

Appearances and goals by club, season and competition
Club	Season	League			National cup (Note: Includes Polish Cup, Turkish Cup)		Europe		Other		Total	
Club	Season	Division	Apps	Goals	Apps	Goals	Apps	Goals	Apps	Goals	Apps	Goals
GKS Tychy	2017–18	I liga	2	0	0	0	—		—		2	0
GKS Tychy	2018–19	I liga	1	0	0	0	—		—		1	0
GKS Tychy	2019–20	I liga	8	2	1	0	—		—		9	2
GKS Tychy	2020–21	I liga	13	0	1	0	—		—		14	0
GKS Tychy	Total		24	2	2	0	—		—		26	2
Lechia Gdańsk	2020–21	Ekstraklasa	13	0	0	0	—		—		13	0
Lechia Gdańsk	2021–22	Ekstraklasa	14	0	2	0	—		—		16	0
Lechia Gdańsk	2022–23	Ekstraklasa	4	0	0	0	1 (Note: Appearance in UEFA Europa Conference League)	0	—		5	0
Lechia Gdańsk	2023–24	I liga	14	1	0	0	—		0	0	14	1
Lechia Gdańsk	Total		45	1	2	0	1	0	0	0	48	1
GKS Tychy (loan)	2022–23	I liga	11	3	1	0	—		—		12	3
GKS Tychy (loan)	2022–23	I liga	8	0	—		—		—		8	0
Sivasspor	2024–25	Süper Lig	11	0	2	0	—		—		13	0
Pogoń Szczecin	2025–26	Ekstraklasa	18	0	1	0	—		—		19	0
Pogoń Szczecin II	2025–26	III liga, gr. II	1	0	—		—		—		1	0
Career total			118	6	8	0	1	0	0	0	127	6

== Honours ==
Lechia Gdańsk

- I liga: 2023–24
