= Bohdan Sarnavskyi =

Ukrainian footballer

Bohdan Sarnavskyi Богдан Сарнавський
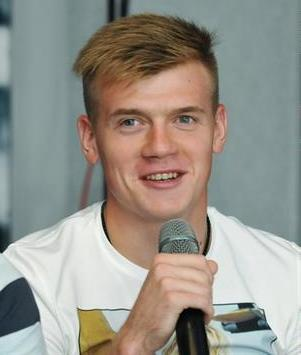
- Sarnavskyi in 2013

Personal information
- Full name: Bohdan Ihorovych Sarnavskyi
- Date of birth: 29 January 1995 (age 31)
- Place of birth: Kyiv, Ukraine
- Height: 1.89 m (6 ft 2 in)
- Position: Goalkeeper

Team information
- Current team: Irtysh Pavlodar
- Number: 29

Youth career
- 2001–2008: Dynamo Kyiv
- 2008–2012: Arsenal Kyiv
- 2013–2014: Shakhtar Donetsk

Senior career*
Years	Team	Apps	(Gls)
2012–2013	Arsenal Kyiv	3	(0)
2014–2016	Shakhtar Donetsk	2	(0)
2016	Ufa	0	(0)
2017	Vorskla Poltava	3	(0)
2018	Veres Rivne	2	(0)
2018–2020	Lviv	33	(0)
2020–2022	Dnipro-1	13	(0)
2021	→ Kryvbas Kryvyi Rih (loan)	19	(0)
2022	→ Hapoel Tel Aviv (loan)	4	(0)
2022–2023	Kryvbas Kryvyi Rih	17	(0)
2023–2026	Lechia Gdańsk	46	(0)
2026–	Irtysh Pavlodar	5	(0)

International career
2010–2012	Ukraine U16	9	(0)
2010–2012	Ukraine U17	26	(0)
2012–2013	Ukraine U18	11	(0)
2012–2014	Ukraine U19	18	(0)
2014–2015	Ukraine U20	8	(0)
2015	Ukraine U21	4	(0)
- * Club domestic league appearances and goals as of 1 November 2026

Bohdan Ihorovych Sarnavskyi (Ukrainian: Богдан Ігорович Сарнавський; born 29 January 1995) is a Ukrainian professional footballer who plays as a goalkeeper for Kazakhstan Premier League club Irtysh Pavlodar.

== Career ==
Sarnavskyi is product of Dynamo Kyiv and Arsenal Kyiv.

He made his debut for FC Arsenal entering as a main squad player in game against Dnipro Dnipropetrovsk on 2 March 2013 in the Ukrainian Premier League.

On 7 July 2022, he signed a contract with Kryvbas Kryvyi Rih.

On 28 July 2023, Sarnavskyi joined Polish second division side Lechia Gdańsk.

== Career statistics ==
As of match played 20 July 2025

Appearances and goals by club, season and competition
Club	Season	League			National cup (Note: Includes Ukrainian Cup, Polish Cup)		Continental		Other		Total	
Club	Season	Division	Apps	Goals	Apps	Goals	Apps	Goals	Apps	Goals	Apps	Goals
Arsenal Kyiv	2012–13	Ukrainian Premier League	3	0	1	0	—		—		4	0
Shakhtar Donetsk	2013–14	Ukrainian Premier League	0	0	—		—		0	0	0	0
Shakhtar Donetsk	2014–15	Ukrainian Premier League	0	0	3	0	—		—		3	0
Shakhtar Donetsk	2015–16	Ukrainian Premier League	2	0	3	0	0	0	0	0	5	0
Shakhtar Donetsk	2016–17	Ukrainian Premier League	0	0	—		0	0	0	0	0	0
Shakhtar Donetsk	Total		2	0	6	0	0	0	0	0	8	0
Ufa	2016–17	Russian Premier League	0	0	—		—		—		0	0
Vorskla	2016–17	Ukrainian Premier League	3	0	—		—		—		3	0
Vorskla	2017–18	Ukrainian Premier League	0	0	0	0	—		—		0	0
Vorskla	Total		3	0	0	0	—		—		3	0
Veres Rivne	2017–18	Ukrainian Premier League	2	0	—		—		—		2	0
Lviv	2018–19	Ukrainian Premier League	8	0	2	0	—		—		10	0
Lviv	2019–20	Ukrainian Premier League	25	0	1	0	—		—		26	0
Lviv	Total		33	0	3	0	—		—		36	0
Dnipro-1	2020–21	Ukrainian Premier League	13	0	3	0	—		—		16	0
Kryvbas Kryvyi Rih (loan)	2021–22	Ukrainian First League	19	0	—		—		—		19	0
Hapoel Tel Aviv (loan)	2021–22	Israeli Premier League	4	0	—		—		—		4	0
Kryvbas Kryvyi Rih	2022–23	Ukrainian Premier League	17	0	—		—		—		17	0
Lechia Gdańsk	2023–24	I liga	31	0	0	0	—		—		31	0
Lechia Gdańsk	2024–25	Ekstraklasa	14	0	1	0	—		—		15	0
Lechia Gdańsk	2025–26	Ekstraklasa	1	0	0	0	—		—		1	0
Lechia Gdańsk	Total		46	0	1	0	—		—		47	0
Career total			142	0	14	0	0	0	0	0	156	0

== Honours ==
Shakhtar Donetsk

- Ukrainian Cup: 2015–16

Lechia Gdańsk

- I liga: 2023–24
