= Jakub Sypek =

Polish footballer (born 2001)

Personal information
- Full name: Jakub Sypek
- Date of birth: 7 April 2001 (age 25)
- Place of birth: Nysa, Poland
- Height: 1.80 m (5 ft 11 in)
- Position: Left winger

Team information
- Current team: Zagłębie Lubin
- Number: 7

Youth career
- –2012: Sparta Paczków
- 2012–2015: Orzeł Ząbkowice Śląskie
- 2015–2017: Zagłębie Lubin

Senior career*
Years	Team	Apps	(Gls)
2018–2022	Zagłębie Lubin II	49	(17)
2020–2022	Zagłębie Lubin	3	(0)
2021	→ Górnik Polkowice (loan)	11	(1)
2022–2025	Widzew Łódź	48	(6)
2023–2024	→ Lechia Gdańsk (loan)	22	(1)
2025–	Zagłębie Lubin	31	(4)

International career
2018	Poland U18	2	(0)
- * Club domestic league appearances and goals as of 17:37, 29 July 2026 (UTC)

Jakub Sypek (born 7 April 2001) is a Polish professional footballer who plays as a left winger for Ekstraklasa club Zagłębie Lubin.

== Career ==
Sypek started playing football for the youth sides of Sparta Paczków and Orzeł Ząbkowice Śląskie, before joining Zagłębie Lubin's academy in 2015. He performed well for the reserve team, earning him a chance to train with the first team in 2020. Sypek made his first team debut in a 0–1 home loss against Wisła Płock on 20 July that year. He continued to feature for the second team, and made a few sparse appearances for the first team, before going on a season-long loan to Górnik Polkowice in 2021. He returned to Zagłębie in January 2022 after six months at Górnik and having made 12 appearances for the club in all competitions.

In 2022, Sypek made a permanent move to fellow Ekstraklasa club Widzew Łódź making 15 league appearances during the 2022–23 season. While Sypek featured regularly for Widzew, he only started twice in the league, which led to a decision to send him on loan for the following season to increase his playing time. In July 2023, he joined recently relegated Lechia Gdańsk on loan.

On 28 June 2025, after being released by Widzew, Sypek re-joined Zagłębie Lubin on a two-year deal.

== Personal life ==
Sypek's brother Michał is also a footballer. Both played in the academies of Sparta Paczków and Orzeł Ząbkowice Śląskie.

== Honours ==
Zagłębie Lubin II

- III liga, group III: 2021–22
- Polish Cup (Lower Silesia regionals): 2018–19
- Polish Cup (Legnica regionals): 2018–19, 2020–21, 2021–22

Lechia Gdańsk

- I liga: 2023–24
