= Dušan Joković =

Serbian footballer

Personal information
- Date of birth: 4 July 1999 (age 27)
- Place of birth: Kraljevo, FR Yugoslavia
- Height: 1.87 m (6 ft 2 in)
- Position: Defender

Team information
- Current team: Příbram
- Number: 23

Senior career*
Years	Team	Apps	(Gls)
2017–2018	Brodarac		
2018–2019	LASK	0	(0)
2018–2019	→ Sesvete (loan)	21	(1)
2019–2020	Lokomotiva Zagreb	0	(0)
2019–2020	→ Sesvete (loan)	12	(1)
2020–2021	Proleter Novi Sad	28	(3)
2022	Metalac GM	9	(0)
2022	Akademija Pandev	7	(1)
2023	Voždovac	2	(0)
2023–2025	Líšeň	37	(1)
2025	GFK Dubočica	12	(0)
2025–	Příbram	1	(0)

International career^{‡}
2018	Serbia U21	2	(0)
- * Club domestic league appearances and goals as of 24 July 2025 ‡ National team caps and goals as of 16 November 2018

Dušan Joković (born 4 July 1999) is a Serbian footballer who plays as a defender for Czech side Příbram.

== Career ==
In 2018, Joković signed for Austrian top flight side LASK from FK Brodarac in the Serbian third division, before being sent on loan to Croatian second division club Sesvete.

In 2019, he signed for Lokomotiva in the Croatian top flight.

For the second half of 2019/20, he signed for Serbian top flight team Proleter Novi Sad.
