= Mateusz Rzeźnik =

Polish footballer (born 2005)

Personal information
- Full name: Mateusz Rzeźnik
- Date of birth: 13 March 2005 (age 21)
- Place of birth: Wolsztyn, Poland
- Height: 1.80 m (5 ft 11 in)
- Position: Midfielder

Team information
- Current team: Polonia Słubice
- Number: 18

Youth career
- 2016–2018: Lech Poznań
- 2019–2020: Grom Wolsztyn
- 2020–2022: Chrobry Głogów
- 2022: Warta Poznań
- 2023: Lechia Gdańsk

Senior career*
Years	Team	Apps	(Gls)
2023	Lechia Gdańsk	1	(0)
2023–2025	Lechia Zielona Góra	20	(0)
2025–	Polonia Słubice	32	(4)
- * Club domestic league appearances and goals as of 18:30, 3 July 2026 (UTC)

Mateusz Rzeźnik (born 13 March 2005) is a Polish professional footballer who plays as a midfielder for IV liga Lubusz club Polonia Słubice.

== Career ==
Rzeźnik began his playing career for the youth sides of Lech Poznań, however found himself moving to various academies around Poland, also featuring for the youth sides of Grom Wolsztyn, Chrobry Głogów, and Warta Poznań, where he experienced his first taste of first team football in a friendly against Jagiellonia Białystok. In early 2023, Rzeźnik moved to Lechia Gdańsk's academy and joined their U19's team.

After Lechia were relegated to the I liga, and with the squad short of players, Rzeźnik was promoted to the first team. During the first game of the season against Chrobry Głogów, Rzeźnik made his professional debut coming on as a late substitute. Within a month of making his Lechia debut, Rzeźnik was demoted back to the U19's side. The club decided on the demotion due to behavioural and drinking problems, which were raised to club officials by a trialist training with the club. Despite having two years left on his contract, due to off these off the field incidents Lechia agreed for Rzeźnik to leave the club on a free transfer.

Just before the 2023 summer transfer window closed, Rzeźnik joined Lechia Zielona Góra, making his debut for the club a week later in the Polish Cup, scoring twice in the match as the team progressed to the next round.

== Honours ==
Lechia Zielona Góra

- Polish Cup (Lubusz regionals): 2023–24
