= Miłosz Kałahur =

Polish association football player

Personal information
- Full name: Miłosz Kałahur
- Date of birth: 29 June 1999 (age 27)
- Place of birth: Gdańsk, Poland
- Height: 1.74 m (5 ft 9 in)
- Position: Left-back

Youth career
- 2008–2010: Lechia Gdańsk
- 2010–2018: AP Lechia Gdańsk

Senior career*
Years	Team	Apps	(Gls)
2016	Lechia Gdańsk II	10	(0)
2018–2021	Sandecja Nowy Sącz	37	(1)
2021–2022	Olimpia Elbląg	32	(2)
2022–2023	Resovia Rzeszów	21	(1)
2023–2026	Lechia Gdańsk	60	(0)
- * Club domestic league appearances and goals as of 08:12, 26 May 2026 (UTC)

Miłosz Kałahur (born 29 June 1999) is a Polish professional footballer who plays as a left-back.

== Career ==
Born in Gdańsk, Kałahur started playing football at an early age with local club Lechia Gdańsk, before spending five years with the newly created football academy AP Lechia Gdańsk. He returned to Lechia Gdańsk, going on to represent the club's second team, making 10 league appearances for the reserve team, but never progressed to the first team.

In 2018, Kałahur joined I liga side Sandecja Nowy Sącz signing a one-year deal with a two-year option, which was exercised after his first season with the club. Kałahur spent the seasons with Sandecja, going on to make 39 appearances for the club in all competitions.

After leaving Sandecja, Kałahur moved down a division and joined Olimpia Elbląg. After a season and making 32 league appearances for Olimpia and winning a fan vote for player of the season, a clause in his contract meant that he was free to join a team in a higher division, which was taken advantage of by Resovia Rzeszów. Kałahur spent a season with Resovia, making 24 appearances in all competitions for the club.

In 2023, Kałahur returned to Gdańsk and joined his boyhood club Lechia Gdańsk, who had just been relegated from the Ekstraklasa.

== Honours ==
Lechia Gdańsk

- I liga: 2023–24

Individual

- Olimpia Elbląg Player of the Season: 2021–22
