= Michał Głogowski (footballer) =

Polish footballer (born 2005)

Personal information
- Full name: Michał Józef Głogowski
- Date of birth: 4 August 2005 (age 21)
- Place of birth: Kraków, Poland
- Height: 1.90 m (6 ft 3 in)
- Position: Forward

Team information
- Current team: Lechia Gdańsk
- Number: 9

Youth career
- 2015–2019: AP 21 Kraków
- 2019–2023: Wisła Kraków

Senior career*
| Years | Team | Apps | (Gls) |
| 2023–2024 | Hutnik Kraków | 34 | (7) |
| 2024– | Lechia Gdańsk | 21 | (1) |
| 2024 | → Hutnik Kraków (loan) | 11 | (4) |

International career
| 2023 | Poland U18 | 2 | (0) |
- * Club domestic league appearances and goals as of 08:11, 26 May 2026 (UTC)

Michał Głogowski (born 4 August 2005) is a Polish professional footballer who plays as a forward for I liga club Lechia Gdańsk.

== Career ==
=== Hutnik Kraków ===
Being born in Kraków, Głogowski started playing football with the academies of AP 21 Kraków and Wisła Kraków. In 2023, just before turning 18, he moved to Hutnik Kraków, playing with the club in the II liga. In his debut season, Głogowski made 27 league appearances, scoring one goal. His second season with Hitnik started strongly. He scored two hat-tricks before the end of August, and after recording seven goals in eight games, Głogowski was transferred to Lechia Gdańsk on 6 September 2024, remaining with Hutnik on loan until the winter break. At the conclusion of his loan with Hutnik, Głogowski had played a total of 45 games for the club in the II liga, scoring 11 goals.

=== Lechia Gdańsk ===
Upon joining Lechia at the start of 2025, Głogowski often featured as a substitute in the second half of the season. He made his Ekstraklasa debut on 1 February 2025, coming on as a late substitute against Motor Lublin. His first top division goal came as a late stoppage time equaliser against Pogoń Szczecin on 17 May 2025, earning Lechia a point in a 3–3 draw.
