= Ivan Zhelizko =

Ukrainian footballer

Personal information
- Full name: Ivan Tarasovych Zhelizko
- Date of birth: 12 February 2001 (age 25)
- Place of birth: Lviv, Ukraine
- Height: 1.87 m (6 ft 2 in)
- Position: Defensive midfielder

Team information
- Current team: Ludogorets
- Number: 6

Youth career
- 2011–2019: Karpaty Lviv
- 2019–2020: Karviná

Senior career*
Years	Team	Apps	(Gls)
2020–2021	Karviná B		
2021–2022	Karviná	3	(0)
2021	→ Valmiera (loan)	25	(1)
2022–2023	Valmiera	44	(5)
2023–2026	Lechia Gdańsk	84	(13)
2026–	Ludogorets	4	(1)

International career
2017–2018	Ukraine U17	13	(0)
2018	Ukraine U18	3	(0)
2019	Ukraine U19	3	(0)
2021–2023	Ukraine U21	23	(0)
2024	Ukraine U23	1	(0)
Medal record
Men's football
Representing Ukraine
UEFA European Under-21 Championship
Bronze medal – third place	2023 Georgia-Romania
- * Club domestic league appearances and goals as of 20:29, 10 November 2026 (UTC)

Ivan Zhelizko (Ukrainian: Іван Тарасович Желізко; born 12 February 2001) is a Ukrainian professional footballer who plays as a defensive midfielder for Bulgarian First League club Ludogorets Razgrad.

He obtained Polish citizenship in November 2026.

== Honours ==
Valmiera

- Latvian Higher League: 2022

Lechia Gdańsk

- I liga: 2023–24
