= Elias Olsson =

Swedish footballer (born 2003)

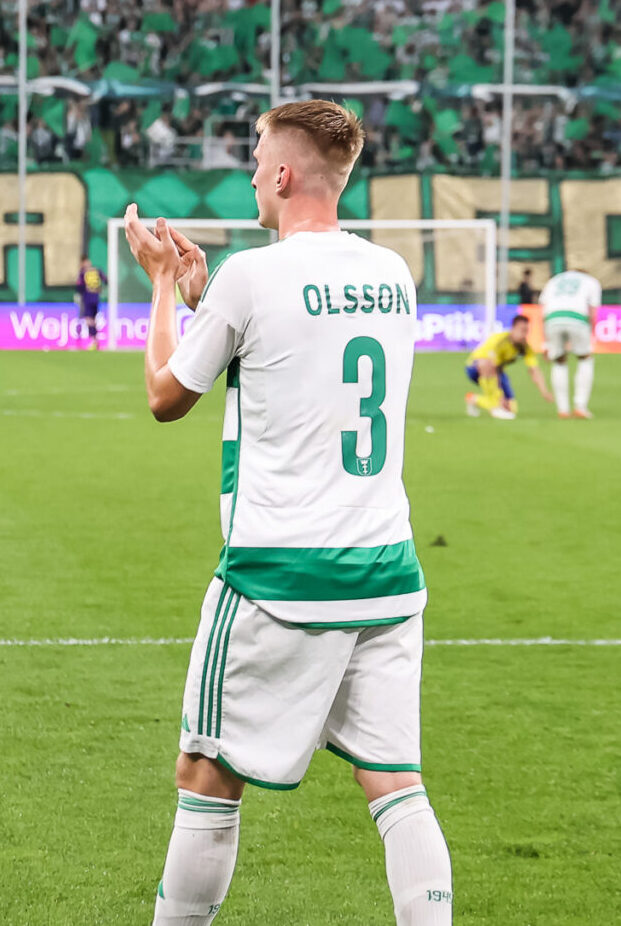
- Olsson with Lechia Gdańsk in 2024

Personal information
- Full name: Elias Oskar Olsson
- Date of birth: 23 April 2003 (age 23)
- Place of birth: Arlöv, Sweden
- Height: 1.92 m (6 ft 4 in)
- Position: Centre-back

Team information
- Current team: Panetolikos
- Number: 4

Youth career
- Arlövs BI
- FC Burlöv
- Kyrkheddinge IF
- –2017: Husie IF
- 2020: Kalmar FF

Senior career*
Years	Team	Apps	(Gls)
2017–2018	Husie IF	23	(6)
2019	IFK Malmö	7	(0)
2021–2023	Kalmar FF	13	(0)
2021–2022	→ FC Groningen (loan)	1	(0)
2022	→ Næstved (loan)	10	(0)
2023–2026	Lechia Gdańsk	70	(3)
2026	→ Wieczysta Kraków (loan)	12	(0)
2026–	Panetolikos	0	(0)

International career
2019	Sweden U17	3	(0)
2021–2023	Sweden U19	11	(0)
2024	Sweden U21	1	(0)
- * Club domestic league appearances and goals as of 21:05, 31 May 2026 (UTC)

Elias Oskar Olsson (born 23 April 2003) is a Swedish professional footballer who plays as a centre-back for Super League Greece club Panetolikos.

== Career ==
In August 2023, Olsson joined recently relegated Polish I liga club Lechia Gdańsk, where he made his debut in a 1–0 victory over Znicz Pruszków, which took place on 13 August 2023. In the 28th minute of that match, he also scored his first goal for his new team. In the 2023–24 season, Lechia made its advance to Ekstraklasa.

On 3 January 2026, Olsson was loaned to I liga side Wieczysta Kraków for the remainder of the season with an option to make the move permanent.

On 3 July 2026, Olsson left Poland to join Super League Greece club Panetolikos on a free transfer.

== Honours ==
Lechia Gdańsk

- I liga: 2023–24

Individual

- Polish Union of Footballers' I liga Team of the Season: 2023–24
