= Bartosz Brzęk =

Polish footballer (born 2005)

Personal information
- Full name: Bartosz Wojciech Brzęk
- Date of birth: 1 December 2005 (age 20)
- Place of birth: Gdańsk, Poland
- Height: 1.80 m (5 ft 11 in)
- Position: Right-back

Team information
- Current team: Olimpia Grudziądz
- Number: 14

Youth career
- 2013–2016: Conrad Gdańsk
- 2016–2018: Jaguar Gdańsk
- 2018–2021: Lechia Gdańsk

Senior career*
Years	Team	Apps	(Gls)
2021–2022	Lechia Gdańsk II	3	(0)
2022–2026	Lechia Gdańsk	6	(0)
2024–2025	→ Wieczysta Kraków (loan)	34	(1)
2026–	Olimpia Grudziądz	12	(0)

International career
2018	Poland U14	1	(0)
- * Club domestic league appearances and goals as of 16:12, 2 June 2026 (UTC)

Bartosz Wojciech Brzęk (born 1 December 2005) is a Polish professional footballer who plays as a right-back for II liga club Olimpia Grudziądz.

== Early life ==
Bartosz Wojciech Brzęk was born on 1 December 2005 in Gdańsk, Poland.

== Career ==
Brzęk started playing football in the academies of Conrad Gdańsk and Jaguar Gdańsk, before joining the academy of Ekstraklasa team Lechia Gdańsk in 2018. After three years with the academy, Brzęk progressed to play in the club's second team, making three league appearances for Lechia Gdańsk II in IV liga. When the Lechia II team was disbanded in 2022, Brzęk signed his first professional contract with Lechia's first team.

In 2023, Lechia were relegated to I liga, which provided Brzęk with his opportunity to make his first professional appearance for the club. He made his Lechia debut on 22 July 2023 in a win against Chrobry Głogów.

On 24 June 2024, he extended his contract with Lechia until 2026 and was subsequently loaned to II liga newcomers Wieczysta Kraków.

On 5 January 2026, it was announced that he was leaving Lechia and joining third division side Olimpia Grudziądz.

== Career statistics ==
As of match played 2 June 2026

Appearances and goals by club, season and competition
Club	Season	League			Polish Cup		Europe		Other		Total	
Club	Season	Division	Apps	Goals	Apps	Goals	Apps	Goals	Apps	Goals	Apps	Goals
Lechia Gdańsk II	2021–22	IV liga Pomerania	3	0	—		—		—		3	0
Lechia Gdańsk	2023–24	I liga	6	0	0	0	—		—		6	0
Lechia Gdańsk	2025–26	Ekstraklasa	0	0	1	0	—		—		1	0
Lechia Gdańsk	Total		6	0	1	0	—		—		7	0
Wieczysta Kraków (loan)	2024–25	II liga	32	0	—		—		2 (Note: Appearance(s) in II liga promotion play-offs)	1	34	1
Olimpia Grudziądz	2025–26	II liga	11	0	—		—		1	0	12	0
Career total			52	0	1	0	—		3	1	56	1

== Honours ==
Lechia Gdańsk

- I liga: 2023–24
