= Łukasz Zjawiński =

Polish footballer

Personal information
- Full name: Łukasz Zjawiński
- Date of birth: 11 July 2001 (age 25)
- Place of birth: Pszczyna, Poland
- Height: 1.89 m (6 ft 2 1/2 in)
- Position: Forward

Team information
- Current team: Legia Warsaw
- Number: 79

Youth career
- –2011: Iskra Pszczyna
- 2011–2012: Ruch Chorzów
- 2012–2014: Iskra Pszczyna
- 2014–2015: Górnik Zabrze
- 2015–2018: Legia Warsaw

Senior career*
Years	Team	Apps	(Gls)
2018–2020	Legia Warsaw II	26	(4)
2019	→ Stal Stalowa Wola (loan)	16	(1)
2020–2021	Stal Mielec	24	(1)
2021–2024	Lechia Gdańsk	35	(5)
2022	→ Sandecja Nowy Sącz (loan)	14	(9)
2022–2023	→ Widzew Łódź (loan)	19	(0)
2024–2026	Polonia Warsaw	66	(43)
2026–	Legia Warsaw	9	(4)

International career
2016	Poland U15	1	(0)
2017	Poland U17	8	(0)
2018	Poland U19	1	(0)
2022	Poland U20	2	(0)
- * Club domestic league appearances and goals as of 21:35, 13 October 2026 (UTC)

Łukasz Zjawiński (born 11 July 2001) is a Polish professional footballer who plays as a forward for Ekstraklasa club Legia Warsaw.

== Club career ==
Zjawiński started his career playing with the youth sides of his local team Iskra Pszczyna. He had spells in the youth sides of the largest teams in the area, Ruch Chorzów and Górnik Zabrze, before moving to Warsaw to join Legia Warsaw. After progressing his way through the Legia youth sides, he started playing for the Legia Warsaw II team, making a total of 26 appearances and scoring four goals over two seasons.

During his time at Legia, he also went on loan to II liga team Stal Stalowa Wola, where he made 16 appearances and scored one goal in his six month loan spell. For the 2020–21 season, Zjawiński joined newly promoted Ekstraklasa side Stal Mielec, making 24 appearances and scoring one goal in his first top flight season.

After just one season with Stal, Zjawiński joined fellow Ekstraklasa side Lechia Gdańsk in July 2021. On 3 January 2022, Lechia had announced that an agreement in principle was reached with Sandecja Nowy Sącz for the loan of Zjawiński until the end of the season. On 17 August 2022, it was announced he would join another Ekstraklasa club Widzew Łódź on a one-year loan, with an option to buy.

He made 31 appearances and scored five goals as Lechia won the second-tier title, but remained at this level for the following campaign after signing a two-year deal with Polonia Warsaw on 20 June 2024.

On 2 June 2026, Zjawiński returned to Legia Warsaw on a free transfer, joining their senior team after signing a four-year deal.

== Honours ==
Legia Warsaw II

- Polish Cup (Masovia regionals): 2018–19

Lechia Gdańsk

- I liga: 2023–24

Individual

- I liga top scorer: 2024–25
- I liga Player of the Month: February & March 2025
