= List of Polish football transfers summer 2025 =

This is a list of Polish football transfers for the 2025 summer transfer window. Only transfers featuring Ekstraklasa are listed.

== Ekstraklasa ==
Note: Flags indicate national team as has been defined under FIFA eligibility rules. Players may hold more than one non-FIFA nationality.

=== Lech Poznań ===
In:

No.	Pos.	Nation	Player
4	DF	POR	João Moutinho (from (Italy) Spezia, previously on loan at Jagiellonia Białystok)
6	MF	KEN	Timothy Ouma (on loan from (Czech Republic) Slavia Prague)
14	MF	SWE	Leo Bengtsson (from (Cyprus) Aris Limassol)
20	DF	POL	Robert Gumny (from (Germany) FC Augsburg)
72	DF	POL	Mateusz Skrzypczak (from Jagiellonia Białystok)
77	FW	HON	Luis Palma (on loan from (Scotland) Celtic, previously on loan at (Greece) Olympiacos)
99	FW	ESP	Pablo Rodríguez (from (Italy) Lecce, previously on loan at (Spain) Racing Santander)

Out:

No.	Pos.	Nation	Player
7	MF	POR	Afonso Sousa (to (Turkey) Samsunspor)
21	MF	BIH	Dino Hotić (to (United Arab Emirates) Ajman Club)
25	DF	SWE	Filip Dagerstål (free agent)
29	DF	DEN	Rasmus Carstensen (loan return to (Germany) 1.FC Köln)
31	GK	POL	Mateusz Mędrala (to Sokół Kleczew)
35	GK	POL	Filip Bednarek (to (Netherlands) Sparta Rotterdam)
55	DF	POL	Maksymilian Pingot (to Górnik Zabrze)
77	FW	ESP	Mario González (loan return to (United States) Los Angeles FC)
—	DF	POL	Igor Kornobis (to Warta Poznań)
—	MF	POL	Maksymilian Dziuba (on loan to Śląsk Wrocław)
—	MF	POL	Aleksander Nadolski (to Znicz Pruszków)

=== Raków Częstochowa ===
In:

No.	Pos.	Nation	Player
5	MF	CRO	Marko Bulat (from (Croatia) Dinamo Zagreb, previously on loan at (Belgium) Standard Liège)
6	MF	POL	Oskar Repka (from GKS Katowice)
8	MF	POL	Tomasz Pieńko (from Zagłębie Lubin)
15	MF	COL	Jesús Díaz (from Stal Rzeszów, previously on loan)
18	FW	NOR	Jonatan Braut Brunes (from (Belgium) OH Leuven, previously on loan)
23	MF	POL	Karol Struski (from (Cyprus) Aris Limassol)
48	GK	POL	Oliwier Zych (on loan from (England) Aston Villa)
66	DF	GRE	Apostolos Konstantopoulos (from (Belgium) Beerschot)
80	FW	FRA	Lamine Diaby-Fadiga (from Jagiellonia Białystok)
88	MF	HUN	Péter Baráth (from (Hungary) Ferencváros, previously on loan)

Out:

No.	Pos.	Nation	Player
3	DF	SRB	Milan Rundić (to (Czech Republic) Slovácko)
5	MF	SWE	Gustav Berggren (to (United States) New York Red Bulls)
8	MF	POL	Ben Lederman (to (Israel) Maccabi Tel Aviv)
12	GK	SVK	Dušan Kuciak (free agent)
14	MF	SRB	Srđan Plavšić (on loan to (Czech Republic) Baník Ostrava)
77	MF	POL	Tobiasz Mras (to Wieczysta Kraków)
88	DF	CRO	Matej Rodin (free agent)
—	MF	POL	Kacper Nowakowski (on loan to Chrobry Głogów, previously on loan at Miedź Legnica)
—	MF	POL	Antoni Burkiewicz (on loan to Polonia Bytom, previously on loan at Podhale Nowy Targ)
—	MF	GRE	Lazaros Lamprou (to (Greece) Volos, previously on loan)
—	MF	POL	Kacper Masiak (to Stal Rzeszów, previously on loan at GKS Jastrzębie)
—	MF	POL	Dawid Drachal (to Jagiellonia Białystok, previously on loan at GKS Katowice)

=== Jagiellonia Białystok ===
In:

No.	Pos.	Nation	Player
4	DF	JPN	Yuki Kobayashi (from (Portugal) Portimonense)
7	DF	ESP	Álex Pozo (on loan from (Spain) Almería)
8	MF	POL	Dawid Drachal (from Raków Częstochowa, previously on loan at GKS Katowice)
9	FW	GRE	Dimitris Rallis (from (Netherlands) Heerenveen)
13	DF	POR	Bernardo Vital (from (Spain) Zaragoza)
18	FW	DEN	Louka Prip (from (Turkey) Konyaspor)
19	MF	ESP	Álex Cantero (from (Spain) Tenerife)
25	MF	USA	Aziel Jackson (from (United States) Columbus Crew)
27	DF	POL	Bartłomiej Wdowik (on loan from (Portugal) Braga, previously on loan at (Germany) Hannover 96)

Out:

No.	Pos.	Nation	Player
1	GK	POL	Max Stryjek (to (Scotland) Kilmarnock)
7	FW	POR	Edi Semedo (loan return to (Cyprus) Aris Limassol)
9	FW	FRA	Lamine Diaby-Fadiga (to Raków Częstochowa)
14	MF	POL	Jarosław Kubicki (to Górnik Zabrze)
16	DF	CZE	Michal Sáček (to Górnik Zabrze)
17	DF	ESP	Adrián Diéguez (to Radomiak Radom)
21	FW	MKD	Darko Churlinov (loan return to (England) Burnley)
23	DF	CMR	Enzo Ebosse (loan return to (Italy) Udinese)
44	DF	POR	João Moutinho (loan return to (Italy) Spezia)
51	FW	POL	Alan Rybak (on loan to Pogoń Siedlce)
71	MF	POL	Szymon Stypułkowski (on loan to Pogoń Siedlce)
72	DF	POL	Mateusz Skrzypczak (to Lech Poznań)
87	DF	GRE	Dimitris Retsos (to (Greece) Asteras Tripolis B)
99	MF	NOR	Kristoffer Normann Hansen (free agent)
—	DF	POL	Paweł Olszewski (to Polonia Warsaw, previously on loan)
—	MF	POL	Wojciech Łaski (to Rekord Bielsko-Biała, previously on loan at Ruch Chorzów)

=== Pogoń Szczecin ===
In:

No.	Pos.	Nation	Player
2	DF	POR	Marian Huja (from (Romania) Petrolul Ploiești)
6	MF	POL	Jan Biegański (from (Turkey) Sivasspor)
7	FW	GAM	Musa Juwara (from (Denmark) Vejle)
14	MF	ESP	José Pozo (from Śląsk Wrocław)
18	FW	NGA	Paul Mukairu (from (Denmark) Copenhagen, previously on loan at (Turkey) Boluspor)
19	MF	SEN	Mor Ndiaye (from (Greece) Athens Kallithea)

Out:

No.	Pos.	Nation	Player
3	DF	CHI	Benjamín Rojas (to (Portugal) Académico Viseu)
6	DF	BRA	Luizão (loan return to (England) West Ham United)
7	MF	POL	Rafał Kurzawa (to Bruk-Bet Termalica)
15	MF	POL	Marcel Wędrychowski (to GKS Katowice)
18	MF	POL	Stanisław Wawrzynowicz (to Sokół Kleczew)
19	MF	POL	Kacper Łukasiak (to GKS Katowice)
21	MF	POR	João Gamboa (to (South Korea) Jeonbuk Hyundai Motors)
27	MF	POL	Olaf Korczakowski (to Puszcza Niepołomice)
33	DF	POL	Mariusz Malec (to Śląsk Wrocław)
46	FW	POL	Antoni Klukowski (to Widzew Łódź)

=== Legia Warsaw ===
In:

No.	Pos.	Nation	Player
6	MF	POR	Henrique Arreiol (from (Portugal) Sporting CP)
13	DF	POL	Arkadiusz Reca (from (Italy) Spezia)
29	FW	DEN	Mileta Rajović (from (England) Watford, previously on loan at (Denmark) Brøndby)
30	DF	SVN	Petar Stojanović (from (Italy) Empoli, previously on loan at (Italy) Salernitana)
44	MF	POL	Damian Szymański (from (Greece) AEK Athens)

Out:

No.	Pos.	Nation	Player
6	MF	POL	Maxi Oyedele (to (France) Strasbourg)
7	FW	CZE	Tomáš Pekhart (free agent)
18	MF	POL	Michał Kucharczyk (to Świt Nowy Dwór Mazowiecki)
28	FW	ESP	Marc Gual (to (Portugal) Rio Ave)
42	DF	ESP	Sergio Barcia (on loan to (Spain) Las Palmas)
52	DF	POL	Oliwier Olewiński (on loan to Pogoń Grodzisk Mazowiecki)
54	GK	POL	Jakub Zieliński (to (Germany) VfL Wolfsburg)
71	MF	POL	Mateusz Szczepaniak (on loan to Pogoń Grodzisk Mazowiecki)
77	GK	BIH	Vladan Kovačević (loan return to (Portugal) Sporting CP)
82	MF	BRA	Luquinhas (loan return to (Brazil) Fortaleza)
—	MF	POL	Jakub Adkonis (on loan to Pogoń Grodzisk Mazowiecki, previously on loan at Ruch Chorzów)
—	GK	POL	Maciej Kikolski (to Widzew Łódź, previously on loan at Radomiak Radom)
—	MF	POL	Bartłomiej Ciepiela (to Znicz Pruszków, previously on loan)
—	FW	POL	Jordan Majchrzak (to (Germany) VfB Stuttgart II, previously on loan at Arka Gdynia)

=== Cracovia ===
In:

No.	Pos.	Nation	Player
7	MF	POL	Mateusz Praszelik (from (Italy) Hellas Verona, previously on loan at (Italy) Südtirol)
9	FW	SUI	Filip Stojilković (from (Germany) Darmstadt 98, previously on loan at (Serbia) OFK Beograd)
18	FW	USA	Kahveh Zahiroleslam (from (Belgium) Sint-Truiden)
21	DF	CRO	Boško Šutalo (on loan from (Belgium) Standard Liège)
33	GK	POL	Konrad Cymerys (from Siarka Tarnobrzeg)
43	MF	POL	Mateusz Klich (from (United States) Atlanta United)
70	MF	AUT	Dijon Kameri (from (Austria) Red Bull Salzburg, previously on loan at (Austria) SCR Altach)
79	DF	POL	Dominik Piła (from Lechia Gdańsk)

Out:

No.	Pos.	Nation	Player
5	DF	ROU	Virgil Ghiță (to (Germany) Hannover 96)
7	FW	NED	Mick van Buren (to (Czech Republic) Hradec Králové)
9	FW	FIN	Benjamin Källman (to (Germany) Hannover 96)
18	MF	POL	Filip Rózga (to (Austria) Sturm Graz)
21	FW	POL	Kacper Śmiglewski (on loan to Puszcza Niepołomice)
22	DF	FIN	Arttu Hoskonen (to (England) Stockport County)
26	GK	POL	Jakub Burek (loan return to Wisła Płock)
33	DF	POL	Jakub Pestka (to Sparta Kazimierza Wielka)
88	MF	POL	Patryk Sokołowski (to Śląsk Wrocław)
—	FW	POL	Szymon Doba (to Górnik Łęczna)
—	DF	POL	Damian Urban (to Chełmianka Chełm, previously on loan at Stal Stalowa Wola)
—	MF	POL	Maciej Mrozik (to KSZO Ostrowiec Świętokrzyski, previously on loan)
—	MF	MKD	Jani Atanasov (to (Greece) AEL, previously on loan at Puszcza Niepołomice)

=== Motor Lublin ===
In:

No.	Pos.	Nation	Player
2	DF	GER	Paskal Meyer (from (Germany) Holstein Kiel II)
7	MF	POR	Ivo Rodrigues (from (Portugal) Moreirense)
9	FW	POL	Karol Czubak (from (Belgium) Kortrijk)
10	MF	POL	Kacper Karasek (from Bruk-Bet Termalica)
20	FW	POL	Kacper Plichta (from Stal Rzeszów)
23	MF	KOS	Florian Haxha (from (Austria) Kapfenberger SV)
75	MF	POL	Kacper Szymanek (from Wisła Puławy)
77	FW	AZE	Renat Dadashov (from Radomiak Radom)
99	GK	POL	Patryk Kukulski (from Jelenia Góra)

Out:

No.	Pos.	Nation	Player
1	GK	POL	Kacper Rosa (to (Azerbaijan) Kapaz)
7	MF	ROU	Antonio Sefer (loan return to (Israel) Hapoel Be'er Sheva)
9	FW	POL	Kacper Wełniak (to GKS Tychy)
11	MF	GER	Kaan Caliskaner (free agent)
22	MF	SEN	Christopher Simon (on loan to Puszcza Niepołomice)
45	GK	POL	Oskar Jeż (on loan to Podlasie Biała Podlaska)
51	GK	POL	Igor Bartnik (to Avia Świdnik)
55	MF	POL	Marcel Gąsior (free agent)
74	DF	POL	Kamil Kruk (to Górnik Łęczna)
75	MF	POL	Kacper Szymanek (on loan to Warta Poznań)
77	MF	POL	Piotr Ceglarz (to Ruch Chorzów)
90	FW	SVK	Samuel Mráz (to (Switzerland) Servette)
97	FW	FRA	Jean-Kévin Augustin (free agent)
—	MF	POL	Sebastian Koziej (on loan to Stal Kraśnik, previously on loan at Wisła Puławy)
—	DF	POL	Miłosz Lewandowski (free agent, previously on loan at Wisła Puławy)
—	DF	POL	Patryk Romanowski (to Resovia, previously on loan at Znicz Pruszków)
—	FW	POL	Mikołaj Kosior (to Hetman Zamość, previously on loan at Świdniczanka Świdnik)

=== GKS Katowice ===
In:

No.	Pos.	Nation	Player
3	DF	POL	Aleksander Paluszek (from Śląsk Wrocław)
5	MF	NED	Jesse Bosch (from (Netherlands) Willem II)
7	FW	POL	Maciej Rosołek (from Piast Gliwice)
10	MF	POL	Marcel Wędrychowski (from Pogoń Szczecin)
14	MF	POL	Jakub Łukowski (from Widzew Łódź)
19	MF	POL	Kacper Łukasiak (from Pogoń Szczecin)
20	MF	POL	Filip Rejczyk (from Śląsk Wrocław)
21	FW	POL	Aleksander Buksa (on loan from Górnik Zabrze)
77	MF	POL	Mateusz Kowalczyk (from (Denmark) Brøndby, previously on loan)

Out:

No.	Pos.	Nation	Player
5	MF	POL	Oskar Repka (to Raków Częstochowa)
7	FW	POL	Sebastian Bergier (to Widzew Łódź)
10	MF	POL	Mateusz Mak (to Znicz Pruszków)
12	GK	POL	Przemysław Pęksa (to (Cyprus) Spartakos Kitiou)
14	DF	POL	Aleksander Komor (to Ruch Chorzów)
18	MF	POL	Dawid Drachal (loan return to Raków Częstochowa)
19	FW	POL	Filip Szymczak (loan return to Lech Poznań)
20	DF	POL	Adrian Danek (free agent)
21	MF	POL	Bartosz Baranowicz (to GKS Jastrzębie)
—	MF	POL	Szymon Krawczyk (to Górnik Łęczna, previously on loan)

=== Górnik Zabrze ===
In:

No.	Pos.	Nation	Player
1	GK	POL	Marcel Łubik (on loan from (Germany) FC Augsburg, previously on loan at GKS Tychy)
9	FW	BRA	Gabriel Barbosa (from (Portugal) Penafiel)
14	MF	POL	Jarosław Kubicki (from Jagiellonia Białystok)
15	MF	GER	Roberto Massimo (from (Germany) Greuther Fürth)
19	MF	POL	Natan Dzięgielewski (from GKS Tychy)
28	MF	FRA	Bastien Donio (from (France) Bourg-en-Bresse)
33	MF	UKR	Maksym Khlan (from Lechia Gdańsk)
55	DF	POL	Maksymilian Pingot (from Lech Poznań)
61	DF	CZE	Michal Sáček (from Jagiellonia Białystok)
74	FW	GRE	Theodoros Tsirigotis (from (Greece) Iraklis)
79	MF	KOR	Goh Young-jun (from (Serbia) Partizan)
99	GK	POL	Tomasz Loska (from Śląsk Wrocław)
—	MF	POL	Wiktor Nowak (from Znicz Pruszków)

Out:

No.	Pos.	Nation	Player
1	GK	POL	Filip Majchrowicz (to Radomiak Radom)
9	FW	TUR	Sinan Bakış (loan return to (Spain) Zaragoza)
21	MF	POL	Dominik Sarapata (to (Denmark) Copenhagen)
25	GK	POL	Michał Szromnik (to Śląsk Wrocław)
31	GK	POL	Mateusz Jeleń (on loan to Sandecja Nowy Sącz)
38	MF	CZE	Filip Prebsl (loan return to (Czech Republic) Slavia Prague)
41	DF	POL	Dawid Mazurek (on loan to Stal Mielec)
44	FW	POL	Aleksander Buksa (on loan to GKS Katowice)
88	MF	JPN	Yosuke Furukawa (loan return to (Japan) Júbilo Iwata)
—	MF	POL	Wiktor Nowak (on loan to Wisła Płock)
—	GK	POL	Kamil Soberka (on loan to Wieczysta Kraków, previously on loan at Unia Skierniewice)
—	DF	POL	Norbert Barczak (on loan to Puszcza Niepołomice, previously on loan at Polonia Bytom)
—	MF	POL	Jan Ciućka (to Rekord Bielsko-Biała, previously on loan)
—	MF	POL	Nikodem Zielonka (to Pogoń Siedlce, previously on loan)

=== Piast Gliwice ===
In:

No.	Pos.	Nation	Player
5	DF	ESP	Juande (from (Spain) Tenerife)
9	FW	ESP	Adrián Dalmau (from Korona Kielce)
11	MF	POR	Leandro Sanca (from (Portugal) Chaves)
17	MF	FRA	Quentin Boisgard (from (Cyprus) Apollon Limassol)
28	DF	POL	Filip Borowski (from Lech Poznań II, previously on loan at Ruch Chorzów)
55	DF	GHA	Ema Twumasi (free agent)
63	FW	BLR	Herman Barkouski (on loan from Puszcza Niepołomice)
80	MF	ESP	Hugo Vallejo (from (Spain) Huesca)

Out:

No.	Pos.	Nation	Player
2	DF	ALG	Akim Zedadka (to (Azerbaijan) Sabah)
3	DF	ESP	Miguel Muñoz (to (Romania) Botoșani)
5	DF	SVK	Tomáš Huk (to (Czech Republic) Sigma Olomouc)
9	FW	POL	Fabian Piasecki (to ŁKS Łódź)
11	FW	BRB	Thierry Gale (loan return to (Austria) Rapid Wien)
12	GK	POL	Bartłomiej Jelonek (free agent)
14	DF	POR	Miguel Nóbrega (loan return to (Portugal) Rio Ave)
17	MF	POL	Filip Karbowy (free agent)
30	MF	POL	Miłosz Szczepański (to ŁKS Łódź)
39	FW	POL	Maciej Rosołek (to GKS Katowice)
77	DF	POL	Arkadiusz Pyrka (to (Germany) FC St. Pauli)
96	MF	MKD	Tihomir Kostadinov (to (Czech Republic) Sigma Olomouc)
—	MF	POL	Jakub Niedbała (on loan to Stal Stalowa Wola, previously on loan at Skra Częstochowa)
—	MF	UKR	Serhiy Krykun (to ŁKS Łódź, previously on loan at Stal Mielec)
—	MF	POL	Damian Kądzior (to GKS Tychy, previously on loan at Stal Mielec)
—	FW	POL	Marcel Bykowski (to GKS Jastrzębie, previously on loan at Pogoń Siedlce)
—	FW	POL	Piotr Urbański (free agent, previously on loan at Pogoń Grodzisk Mazowiecki)

=== Korona Kielce ===
In:

No.	Pos.	Nation	Player
9	MF	CRO	Stjepan Davidović (from (Slovenia) Radomlje)
11	FW	BUL	Vladimir Nikolov (from (Bulgaria) Slavia Sofia)
15	DF	POL	Nikodem Niski (from Pogoń Grodzisk Mazowiecki)
26	DF	BUL	Viktor Popov (from (Bulgaria) Cherno More)
61	DF	POL	Jakub Budnicki (from GKS Tychy)
70	FW	ESP	Antoñín (from (Spain) Gimnàstic)
88	MF	SVN	Tamar Svetlin (from (Slovenia) Celje)
—	DF	MNE	Slobodan Rubežić (from (Scotland) Aberdeen, previously on loan at (Serbia) Novi Pazar)

Out:

No.	Pos.	Nation	Player
2	DF	CAN	Dominick Zator (to Arka Gdynia)
4	DF	POL	Piotr Malarczyk (retired)
9	FW	BLR	Yevgeny Shikavka (to Zagłębie Sosnowiec)
10	MF	JPN	Shuma Nagamatsu (to Ruch Chorzów)
17	MF	POL	Mariusz Fornalczyk (to Widzew Łódź)
18	MF	ISR	Yoav Hofmayster (free agent)
19	MF	POL	Jakub Konstantyn (to Pogoń Grodzisk Mazowiecki)
20	FW	ESP	Adrián Dalmau (to Piast Gliwice)
27	MF	POR	Pedro Nuno (to (Romania) Oțelul Galați)
28	MF	CAN	Marcus Godinho (to (Sweden) Degerfors)
66	DF	POL	Miłosz Trojak (to (South Korea) Ulsan HD)
77	MF	POL	Adam Chojecki (on loan to Podhale Nowy Targ)
99	FW	POL	Daniel Bąk (on loan to Znicz Pruszków)

=== Radomiak Radom ===
In:

No.	Pos.	Nation	Player
1	GK	POL	Filip Majchrowicz (from Górnik Zabrze)
2	MF	GUI	Ibrahima Camará (from (Portugal) Boavista)
5	DF	FRA	Jérémy Blasco (from (Spain) Huesca)
7	MF	CPV	Vasco Lopes (from (Portugal) AVS)
17	FW	POL	Alex Niziołek (from (Germany) Borussia Dortmund U19)
20	DF	BRA	João Pedro (from (United States) Charlotte FC, previously on loan at (Portugal) Rio Ave)
21	FW	GNB	Elves Baldé (from (Portugal) Farense)
25	FW	BRA	Maurides (from (Germany) FC St. Pauli, previously on loan at (Hungary) Debrecen)
26	DF	ESP	Adrián Diéguez (from Jagiellonia Białystok)
29	FW	ANG	Depú (from (Portugal) Gil Vicente, previously on loan at (Serbia) Vojvodina)

Out:

No.	Pos.	Nation	Player
1	GK	POL	Maciej Kikolski (loan return to Legia Warsaw)
3	DF	POL	Szymon Kilianek (on loan to Chełmianka Chełm)
4	DF	AZE	Rahil Mammadov (to (Azerbaijan) Araz-Naxçıvan)
5	DF	MAR	Saad Agouzoul (loan return to (France) Auxerre)
6	MF	POR	Bruno Jordão (to (Bulgaria) CSKA Sofia)
7	FW	BRA	Pedro Perotti (to (Brazil) Chapecoense)
17	FW	AZE	Renat Dadashov (to Motor Lublin)
19	MF	POR	Rafael Barbosa (to (Portugal) AVS)
20	MF	POL	Radosław Cielemęcki (to Podhale Nowy Targ)
21	MF	POL	Jakub Snopczyński (on loan to Star Starachowice)
23	DF	POR	Paulo Henrique (to (Portugal) Marítimo)
25	DF	SUI	Marco Burch (loan return to Legia Warsaw)
33	DF	POL	Kamil Pestka (to Wieczysta Kraków)
88	MF	POR	Chico Ramos (to (Portugal) Paços Ferreira)
—	DF	POL	Damian Jakubik (to Pogoń Siedlce, previously on loan)
—	DF	POL	Dariusz Pawłowski (to Rekord Bielsko-Biała, previously on loan at (Slovakia) Tatran Prešov)
—	MF	POL	Dominik Banach (to Resovia, previously on loan)

=== Widzew Łódź ===
In:

No.	Pos.	Nation	Player
5	DF	CYP	Stelios Andreou (from (Belgium) Charleroi)
7	MF	POL	Mariusz Fornalczyk (from Korona Kielce)
8	MF	CRO	Tonio Teklić (from (Turkey) Trabzonspor, previously on loan at (Turkey) Erzurumspor)
13	DF	KOS	Dion Gallapeni (from (Kosovo) Prishtina)
14	DF	ESP	Ricardo Visus (from (Spain) Real Betis, previously on loan at (Netherlands) Almere City)
16	DF	DEN	Peter Therkildsen (from (Sweden) Djurgården, previously on loan)
18	MF	ALB	Lindon Selahi (from (Croatia) Rijeka)
20	FW	POL	Antoni Klukowski (from Pogoń Szczecin)
41	GK	POL	Antoni Błocki (from Świt Nowy Dwór Mazowiecki, previously on loan)
57	MF	NGA	Samuel Akere (from (Bulgaria) Botev Plovdiv)
77	MF	ESP	Ángel Baena (from Wisła Kraków)
98	GK	POL	Maciej Kikolski (from Legia Warsaw, previously on loan at Radomiak Radom)
99	FW	POL	Sebastian Bergier (from GKS Katowice)

Out:

No.	Pos.	Nation	Player
2	DF	POR	Luís Silva (to (Cyprus) Anorthosis Famagusta)
7	MF	POL	Jakub Łukowski (to GKS Katowice)
8	MF	NGA	Hilary Gong (to (Slovakia) Spartak Trnava)
15	DF	ESP	Juan Ibiza (to (Thailand) Buriram United)
21	DF	POL	Paweł Kwiatkowski (on loan to Stal Mielec)
29	FW	SVK	Ľubomír Tupta (loan return to (Czech Republic) Slovan Liberec)
37	MF	GER	Sebastian Kerk (to Arka Gdynia)
44	MF	FRA	Noah Diliberto (to (Belgium) Francs Borains)
70	MF	POL	Nikodem Stachowicz (on loan to Sokół Kleczew)
73	MF	POL	Kajetan Radomski (on loan to Stal Stalowa Wola)
77	MF	POL	Jakub Sypek (to Zagłębie Lubin)
92	MF	POR	Fábio Nunes (free agent)
99	FW	BIH	Said Hamulić (loan return to (France) Toulouse)
—	GK	SVK	Ivan Krajčírik (to (Czech Republic) Slovan Liberec, previously on loan)
—	DF	KOS	Kreshnik Hajrizi (to (Switzerland) Sion, previously on loan)
—	MF	POL	Dawid Tkacz (to Górnik Łęczna, previously on loan at Stal Mielec)

=== Lechia Gdańsk ===
In:

No.	Pos.	Nation	Player
15	DF	UKR	Maksym Dyachuk (on loan from (Ukraine) Dynamo Kyiv)
16	DF	LVA	Alvis Jaunzems (from Stal Mielec)
27	DF	SVK	Matúš Vojtko (from (Slovakia) Slovan Bratislava)
72	FW	UAE	Mohamed Awadalla (on loan from (United Arab Emirates) Al Ain)
90	FW	POL	Dawid Kurminowski (from Zagłębie Lubin)

Out:

No.	Pos.	Nation	Player
4	DF	ROU	Andrei Chindriș (free agent)
11	DF	POL	Dominik Piła (to Cracovia)
16	MF	AUS	Louis D'Arrigo (to (Australia) Melbourne Victory)
24	DF	POL	Bartosz Brylowski (to Cartusia Kartuzy)
30	MF	UKR	Maksym Khlan (to Górnik Zabrze)
45	DF	POL	Marcel Bajko (on loan to GKS Wikielec)
—	DF	POL	Filip Koperski (to Olimpia Grudziądz, previously on loan)

=== Zagłębie Lubin ===
In:

No.	Pos.	Nation	Player
3	DF	UKR	Roman Yakuba (from Puszcza Niepołomice)
9	FW	GRE	Michalis Kosidis (from (Greece) AEK Athens, previously on loan at Puszcza Niepołomice)
19	MF	POL	Jakub Sypek (from Widzew Łódź)
35	DF	CRO	Luka Lučić (from (Croatia) Slaven Belupo)

Out:

No.	Pos.	Nation	Player
3	DF	SWE	Alexander Abrahamsson (to (Hungary) Győr)
21	MF	POL	Tomasz Pieńko (to Raków Częstochowa)
24	MF	POL	Krzysztof Kolanko (on loan to Podbeskidzie)
29	MF	POL	Marcin Listkowski (loan return to Jagiellonia Białystok)
33	DF	POL	Jarosław Jach (to Znicz Pruszków)
34	GK	POL	Michał Matys (on loan to Stal Mielec)
80	FW	POL	Daniel Mikołajewski (loan return to (Italy) Parma)
88	FW	POL	Rafał Adamski (to Pogoń Grodzisk Mazowiecki)
90	FW	POL	Dawid Kurminowski (to Lechia Gdańsk)
—	DF	POL	Szymon Karasiński (reloan to Ruch Chorzów)
—	DF	POL	Kacper Lepczyński (to Warta Poznań)

=== Arka Gdynia ===
In:

No.	Pos.	Nation	Player
4	DF	CAN	Dominick Zator (from Korona Kielce)
6	MF	ESP	Luis Perea (from (Spain) Racing Ferrol)
10	MF	FRA	Aurélien Nguiamba (free agent)
22	FW	ESP	Diego Percan (from (Spain) Barcelona B)
30	GK	POL	Kacper Krzepisz (free agent)
33	DF	POL	Dawid Abramowicz (from Puszcza Niepołomice)
37	MF	GER	Sebastian Kerk (from Widzew Łódź)
99	FW	ESP	Edu Espiau (from (Spain) Burgos)
—	DF	POL	Oskar Kubiak (from Wda Świecie)

Out:

No.	Pos.	Nation	Player
4	DF	SVK	Martin Dobrotka (to (Slovakia) Pohronie)
6	DF	POL	Kasjan Lipkowski (on loan to GKS Tychy)
13	DF	UKR	Oleksandr Azatskyi (to Polonia Bytom)
21	FW	POL	Kacper Skóra (to Zagłębie Sosnowiec)
31	MF	POL	Jakub Staniszewski (on loan to Pogoń Grodzisk Mazowiecki)
33	GK	POL	Paweł Depka (on loan to GKS Wikielec)
34	FW	POL	Wiktor Sawicki (on loan to GKS Jastrzębie)
80	MF	BIH	Zvonimir Petrović (to Miedź Legnica)
99	FW	POL	Jordan Majchrzak (loan return to Legia Warsaw)
—	DF	POL	Oskar Kubiak (on loan to Sokół Kleczew)
—	DF	POL	Kamil Górecki (on loan to GKS Wikielec, previously on loan at Olimpia Elbląg)
—	MF	POL	Wojciech Zieliński (on loan to GKS Wikielec, previously on loan at Olimpia Elbląg)
—	MF	POL	Michał Borecki (to Znicz Pruszków, previously on loan)

=== Bruk-Bet Termalica ===
In:

No.	Pos.	Nation	Player
5	DF	ARG	Lucas Masoero (from (Romania) Universitatea Cluj)
8	MF	POL	Rafał Kurzawa (from Pogoń Szczecin)
9	FW	ESP	Jesús Jiménez (from (India) Kerala Blasters)
16	DF	POL	Miłosz Kozik (from Ślęza Wrocław)
23	MF	ESP	Sergio Guerrero (from (Spain) Cartagena)
27	DF	ROU	Radu Boboc (from (Romania) Universitatea Cluj)

Out:

No.	Pos.	Nation	Player
5	DF	POL	Wiktor Matyjewicz (loan return to (Greece) Athens Kallithea)
8	MF	UKR	Andriy Dombrovskyi (free agent)
10	MF	POL	Kacper Karasek (to Motor Lublin)
17	MF	UKR	Taras Zaviyskyi (free agent)
23	DF	AUT	Lukas Spendlhofer (to (Austria) TSV Hartberg)
80	MF	POL	Jakub Różycki (on loan to KKS Kalisz)
88	GK	POL	Mikołaj Molga (on loan to GKS Jastrzębie)
90	MF	POL	Jakub Nowakowski (to Znicz Pruszków)
—	DF	POL	Arkadiusz Morąg (on loan to Busko-Zdrój, previously on loan at KS Wiązownica)
—	FW	POL	Jakub Branecki (on loan to Chełmianka Chełm, previously on loan at Chojniczanka Chojnice)
—	MF	POL	Tomasz Płaneta (to Siarka Tarnobrzeg, previously on loan)

=== Wisła Płock ===
In:

No.	Pos.	Nation	Player
3	DF	GEO	Aleksandre Kalandadze (from (Georgia (country)) Dinamo Tbilisi, previously on loan at (Hungary) Fehérvár)
9	FW	GRE	Giannis Niarchos (from (Slovakia) Dunajská Streda, previously on loan at (Slovakia) Košice)
12	GK	POL	Rafał Leszczyński (from Śląsk Wrocław)
13	DF	FRA	Quentin Lecoeuche (from (France) Caen)
17	MF	POR	Matchoi Djaló (on loan from (Turkey) İstanbul Başakşehir)
30	MF	POL	Wiktor Nowak (on loan from Górnik Zabrze)
35	DF	POL	Marcin Kamiński (from (Germany) Schalke 04)

Out:

No.	Pos.	Nation	Player
21	MF	POL	Miłosz Brzozowski (loan return to (Germany) Hansa Rostock)
30	MF	AUT	Denis Bošnjak (free agent)
47	MF	BEL	Ignace Abdelhamid (free agent)
77	DF	POL	Jakub Szymański (to Polonia Bytom)
91	MF	BLR	Gleb Kuchko (on loan to Miedź Legnica)
98	GK	POL	Piotr Zieliński (to Unia Swarzędz)
99	GK	POL	Bartłomiej Gradecki (free agent)
—	MF	POL	Maciej Famulak (reloan to Pogoń Siedlce)
—	GK	POL	Oskar Klon (to Świt Szczecin)
—	GK	POL	Filip Kraska (to Tłuchowia Tłuchowo, previously on loan)
—	FW	POL	Mateusz Lewandowski (to ŁKS Łódź, previously on loan at Chrobry Głogów)
—	FW	POL	Sebastian Strózik (to Chrobry Głogów, previously on loan at Stal Stalowa Wola)

== See also ==
- 2025–26 Ekstraklasa
