= 2025–26 Jagiellonia Białystok season =

Jagiellonia Białystok
2025–26 season
- Manager: Adrian Siemieniec
- Stadium: Białystok Stadium
- Ekstraklasa: 3rd
- Polish Cup: Round of 16
- UEFA Conference League: Knockout phase play-offs
- Top goalscorer: League: Afimico Pululu (15 goals); All: Afimico Pululu (21 goals)
- Highest home attendance: 20,048 vs Legia Warsaw
- Lowest home attendance: 13,021 vs Radomiak Radom
- Biggest win: Jagiellonia Białystok 4–0 Arka Gdynia
- Biggest defeat: Jagiellonia Białystok 0–4 Termalica
Home colours	Away colours	Third colours
- All statistics correct as of 23 May 2026.

The 2025–26 season was the 106th season in the history of Jagiellonia Białystok, and the club's 19th consecutive season in Ekstraklasa. In addition to the domestic league, the team is participating in the Polish Cup and the UEFA Conference League.

== Transfers ==
=== In ===
Pos.	Player	Transferred from	Fee	Date	Source
GK	(Poland) Miłosz Piekutowski	(Poland) Stal Stalowa Wola	Loan return	30 June 2025	
MF	(Poland) Marcin Listkowski	(Poland) Zagłębie Lubin	Loan return	30 June 2025	
DF	(Poland) Paweł Olszewski	(Poland) Polonia Warsaw	Loan return	30 June 2025	
MF	(Poland) Wojciech Łaski	(Poland) Ruch Chorzów	Loan return	30 June 2025	
FW	(Greece) Dimitris Rallis	(Netherlands) Heerenveen	Free	1 July 2025	
MF	(Poland) Dawid Drachal	(Poland) Raków Częstochowa	Undisclosed	1 July 2025	
DF	(Poland) Bartłomiej Wdowik	(Portugal) Braga	Loan	1 July 2025	
FW	(Denmark) Louka Prip	(Turkey) Konyaspor	Free	1 July 2025	
DF	(Portugal) Bernardo Vital	(Spain) Real Zaragoza	€500K	3 July 2025	
DF	(Japan) Yuki Kobayashi	(Portugal) Portimonense	Undisclosed	3 July 2025	
FW	(Spain) Alejandro Cantero	(Spain) Tenerife	Free	9 July 2025	
DF	(Spain) Alejandro Pozo	(Spain) Almería	Loan	15 July 2025	
MF	(United States) Aziel Jackson	(United States) Columbus Crew	Undisclosed	23 July 2025	
FW	(Belgium) Youssuf Sylla	(Belgium) Charleroi	Undisclosed	31 August 2025	
MF	(Spain) Sergio Lozano	(Spain) Levante	Undisclosed	2 September 2025	
DF	(Madagascar) Andy Pelmard	(France) Clermont Foot	Loan	8 September 2025	
MF	(Poland) Kamil Jóźwiak	Unattached	Undisclosed	11 September 2025	
DF	(Portugal) Guilherme Montóia	(Portugal) Estrela da Amdora	Undisclosed	23 January 2026	
FW	(Bosnia and Herzegovina) Samed Baždar	(Spain) Zaragoza	Loan	25 January 2026	
DF	(Greece) Apostolos Konstantopoulos	(Poland) Raków Częstochowa	Undisclosed	30 January 2026	
MF	(Poland) Kajetan Szmyt	(Poland) Zagłębie Lubin	€700K	6 February 2026	

=== Out ===
Pos.	Player	Transferred from	Fee	Date	Source
DF	(Portugal) João Moutinho	(Italy) Spezia	Loan return	30 June 2025	
FW	(North Macedonia) Darko Churlinov	(England) Burnley	Loan return	30 June 2025	
FW	(Portugal) Edi Semedo	(Cyprus) Aris Limassol	Loan return	30 June 2025	
MF	(Poland) Jarosław Kubicki	(Poland) Górnik Zabrze	End of contract	1 July 2025	
FW	(Norway) Kristoffer Normann Hansen	(Vietnam) Nam Định	End of contract	1 July 2025	
DF	(Czech Republic) Michal Sáček	(Poland) Górnik Zabrze	End of contract	1 July 2025	
FW	(France) Lamine Diaby-Fadiga	(Poland) Raków Częstochowa	€120K	1 July 2025	
DF	(Poland) Mateusz Skrzypczak	(Poland) Lech Poznań	€900K	1 July 2025	
DF	(Poland) Paweł Olszewski	(Poland) Polonia Warsaw	From loan to permanent transfer	1 July 2025	
MF	(Poland) Filip Wolski	(Poland) Stal Rzeszów	Undisclosed	1 July 2025	
GK	(Poland) Max Stryjek	(Scotland) Kilmarnock	Undisclosed	4 July 2025	
DF	(Spain) Adrián Diéguez	(Poland) Radomiak Radom	Mutual consent	28 July 2025	
FW	(Spain) Miki Villar	(Poland) Wieczysta Kraków	€650K	8 September 2025	
FW	(Portugal) Tomás Silva	(Bulgaria) Dobrudzha	Mutual consent	8 September 2025	
FW	(Poland) Oskar Pietuszewski	(Portugal) Porto	€10M	7 January 2026	
FW	(Poland) Marcin Listkowski	(Poland) GKS Tychy	Mutual consent	13 January 2026	
FW	(Spain) Alejandro Cantero	(Spain) SD Huesca	Mutual consent	22 January 2026	
DF	(Poland) Cezary Polak	(Poland) Miedź Legnica	Loan	24 January 2026	
FW	(Denmark) Louka Prip	(Denmark) Hvidovre	Mutual consent	27 January 2026	
MF	(United States) Aziel Jackson	(Canada) Vancouver Whitecaps	Loan	30 January 2026	

== Friendlies ==
=== Pre-season ===
2 July 2025 Friendly	Jagiellonia Białystok (Poland)	2–0	(Poland) Górnik Łęczna	Białystok
11:00 CEST	Pietuszewski 16'; Rybak 85'	Report		Stadium: Ośrodek treningowy Jagiellonii Białystok; Attendance: 500; Referee: Daniel Niemyjski

6 July 2025 Friendly	Jagiellonia Białystok (Poland)	1–7	(Poland) Widzew Łódź	Opalenica
10:00 CEST	Drachal 119'	Report	Akere 19', 50'; Álvarez 74'; Bergier 80', 116'; Kozlovský 93'; Nawrocki 106'	Stadium: Hotel Remes Sport & Spa

11 July 2025 Friendly	Jagiellonia Białystok (Poland)	0–1	(Poland) Zagłębie Lubin	Opalenica
17:00 CEST		Report	Nalepa 83'	Stadium: Hotel Remes Sport & Spa

12 July 2025 Friendly	Jagiellonia Białystok (Poland)	0–1	(Czech Republic) Teplice	Opalenica
17:00 CEST			Beranek 67'	Stadium: Hotel Remes Sport & Spa

19 July 2025 Friendly	Jagiellonia Białystok (Poland)	5–1	(Poland) KS Wasilków	Białystok
11:30 CEST	Vital 16', 18'; Cantero 25', 28'; Diéguez 39'	Report	Niedźwiecki 41'	Stadium: Ośrodek treningowy Jagiellonii Białystok

=== Mid-season ===
9 October 2025 Friendly	Jagiellonia Białystok (Poland)	3–1	(Poland) Polonia Warsaw	Białystok
12:30 CEST	Lozano 17'; Jackson 44'; Sylla 62'	Report	Vasin 33'	Stadium: Ośrodek treningowy Jagiellonii Białystok

14 November 2025 Friendly	Jagiellonia Białystok (Poland)	5–1	(Poland) Pogoń Grodzisk Mazowiecki	Białystok
12:00 CET	Jóźwiak 3'; Pululu 30'; Sylla 51'; Kobayashi 59', 88'	Report	Noiszewski 12'	Stadium: Ośrodek treningowy Jagiellonii Białystok

15 January 2026 Friendly	Jagiellonia Białystok (Poland)	1–4	(Austria) LASK Linz	Belek, Turkey
15:30 TRT	Pululu 50' (pen.)	Report	Adeniran 19', 61'; Horvath 20'; Daněk 46'	Stadium: Cornelia Sport Center

19 January 2026 Friendly	Jagiellonia Białystok (Poland)	1–1	(Bulgaria) CKSA 1948	Belek, Turkey
11:00 TRT	Lozano 37'	Report	Franco 16'	Stadium: Cornelia Sport Center

23 January 2026 Friendly	Jagiellonia Białystok (Poland)	3–0	(Serbia) Čukarički	Belek, Turkey
11:00 TRT	Imaz 5', 7'; Pululu 21'	Report		Stadium: Cornelia Sport Center
Note: Fixture stopped after 45 minutes due to poor weather conditions.

23 January 2026 Friendly	Jagiellonia Białystok (Poland)	Cancelled	(Slovenia) Maribor	Belek, Turkey
				Stadium: Cornelia Sport Center
Note: Cancelled due to poor weather conditions.

== Competitions ==
=== Overall record ===
Competition	First match	Last match	Starting round	Final position	Record							
Competition	First match	Last match	Starting round	Final position	Pld	W	D	L	GF	GA	GD	Win %
Ekstraklasa	18 July 2025	23 May 2026	Matchday 1	3rd	34	15	11	8	56	41	+15	44.12
Polish Cup	30 October 2025	4 December 2025	Round of 32	Round of 16	2	1	0	1	4	5	−1	50.00
UEFA Conference League	24 July 2025	26 February 2026	Second qualifying round	Knockout phase play-offs	15	8	5	2	20	14	+6	53.33
Total					51	24	16	11	80	60	+20	47.06

Last updated: 23 May 2026
Source: Soccerway

=== Ekstraklasa ===
==== League table ====
Pos	Team	Pld	W	D	L	GF	GA	GD	Pts	Qualification or relegation
1	Lech Poznań (C)	34	16	12	6	62	45	+17	60	Qualification for the Champions League second qualifying round
2	Górnik Zabrze	34	16	8	10	50	38	+12	56 (Note: Head-to-head points: Górnik Zabrze 6, Jagiellonia Białystok 0.)	Qualification for the Champions League second qualifying round
3	Jagiellonia Białystok	34	15	11	8	56	41	+15	56	Qualification for the Europa League third qualifying round (Note: The 2025–26 Polish Cup winners (Górnik Zabrze) qualify for the Europa League third qualifying round. As Górnik Zabrze finished in the top 2, then the berth went to the third place team.)
4	Raków Częstochowa	34	16	7	11	51	40	+11	55	Qualification for the Conference League second qualifying round
5	GKS Katowice	34	14	8	12	51	45	+6	50	Qualification for the Conference League second qualifying round

Source: ekstraklasa.org 90minut.pl
Rules for classification: 1) Points; 2) Head-to-head points; 3) Head-to-head goal difference; 4) Goal difference; 5) Goals scored; 6) Number of wins; 7) Number of away wins; 8) Lower number of points based on yellow and red cards (red card = 3 points, yellow card = 1 point, sending-off = 3 points - including 1 point for first yellow card); 9) Fairplay ranking; 10) Draw.
(Note: Head-to-head record is used only after all the matches between the teams in question have been played)
(C) Champions

==== Results summary ====
Overall								Home						Away					
Pld	W	D	L	GF	GA	GD	Pts	W	D	L	GF	GA	GD	W	D	L	GF	GA	GD
34	15	11	8	55	41	+14	56	9	3	5	34	24	+10	6	8	3	21	17	+4

Last updated: 23 May 2026.

==== Results by round ====
Round	1	2	3	4	5	6	7	8	9	10	11	12	13	14	15	16	17	18	19	20	21	22	23	24	25	26	27	28	29	30	31	32	33	34
Ground	H	H	A	H	A	A	H	A	H	A	H	H	A	H	A	H	A	A	A	H	A	H	H	A	H	A	H	A	A	H	A	H	A	H
Result	L	W	D	W	W	D	W	D	W	D	W	W	L	L	W	W	D	L	W	W	D	D	D	L	L	L	D	D	W	L	W	W	D	W
Position	17	12	3	7	4	3	4	4	4	4	2	1	2	3	2	2	2	4	3	1	1	1	1	2	4	3	2	3	2	2	2	4	3	3

Updated to match(es) played on 23 May 2026. Source:
A = Away; H = Home; W = Win; D = Draw; L = Loss

==== Matches ====
18 July 2025 1	Jagiellonia Białystok	0–4	Bruk-Bet Termalica Nieciecza	Białystok
18:00			Kubica 17'; Zapolnik 42' (pen.); Faßbender 45'; Isik 75'	Stadium: Białystok Stadium; Attendance: 18,007; Referee: Paweł Malec

27 July 2025 2	Jagiellonia Białystok	3–2	Widzew Łódź	Białystok
17:30	Drachal 3'; Imaz 90+1'; Pululu 90+3'		Bergier 25', 60'	Stadium: Białystok Stadium; Attendance: 19,987; Referee: Wojciech Myć

10 August 2025 4	Jagiellonia Białystok	5–2	Cracovia	Białystok
17:30	Pietuszewski 19'; Pululu 55' (pen.); Romanczuk 73'; Pozo 82'; Rallis 88'		Stojilković 15'; Kakabadze 20'; Perković (red card) 69'	Stadium: Białystok Stadium; Attendance: 18,270; Referee: Patryk Gryckiewicz

17 August 2025 5	Radomiak Radom	1–2	Jagiellonia Białystok	Radom
17:30	Grzesik 32'		Imaz 43', 50'	Stadium: Stadion im. Braci Czachorów; Attendance: 8,563; Referee: Wojciech Myć

30 August 2025 7	Jagiellonia Białystok	2–0	Lechia Gdańsk	Białystok
17:30	Rallis 27'; Imaz 43'			Stadium: Białystok Stadium; Attendance: 19,589; Referee: Piotr Rzucidło

13 September 2025 8	Piast Gliwice	1–1	Jagiellonia Białystok	Gliwice
20:15	Boisgard (red card) 52'; Juande 90+3'		Imaz 61'	Stadium: Piotr Wieczorek Municipal Stadium; Referee: Paweł Raczkowski

19 September 2025 9	Wisła Płock	0–1	Jagiellonia Białystok	Płock
20:30			Pululu 82' (pen.)	Stadium: Kazimierz Górski Stadium; Attendance: 10,121; Referee: Piotr Lasyk
Note: The order of the two fixtures between the teams was reversed due to renovation works at Białystok Stadium.

24 September 2025 6	Legia Warsaw	0–0	Jagiellonia Białystok	Warsaw
21:00				Stadium: Polish Army Stadium; Referee: Damian Sylwestrzak

27 September 2025 10	Lech Poznań	2–2	Jagiellonia Białystok	Poznań
14:45	Bengtsson 46'; Ishak 59' (pen.)		Imaz 45+3'; Pietuszewski 48'	Stadium: Poznań Stadium; Attendance: 35,299; Referee: Bartosz Frankowski

4 October 2025 11	Jagiellonia Białystok	3–1	Korona Kielce	Białystok
12:15	Lozano 45', 56'; Imaz 81'		Soteriou 90+4'	Stadium: Białystok Stadium; Attendance: 19,007; Referee: Tomasz Kwiatkowski

18 October 2025 12	Jagiellonia Białystok	4–0	Arka Gdynia	Białystok
18:00	Lozano 16'; Sylla 57'; Pululu 66', 70'			Stadium: Białystok Stadium; Attendance: 18,607; Referee: Karol Arys

25 October 2025 13	Górnik Zabrze	2–1	Jagiellonia Białystok	Zabrze
17:30	Hellebrand 15'; Pozo 87' (o.g.)		Imaz 10'	Stadium: Arena Zabrze; Attendance: 25,221; Referee: Bartosz Frankowski

31 October 2025 14	Jagiellonia Białystok	1–2	Raków Częstochowa	Białystok
17:30	Pululu 80'		Repka 31', 46'	Stadium: Białystok Stadium; Attendance: 18,446; Referee: Paweł Raczkowski

8 November 2025 15	Pogoń Szczecin	1–2	Jagiellonia Białystok	Szczecin
17:30	Grosicki 27'		Rallis 13'; Pietuszewski 90+3'	Stadium: Stadion Miejski im. Floriana Krygiera; Attendance: 19,867; Referee: Piotr Lasyk

29 November 2025 17	Zagłębie Lubin	0–0	Jagiellonia Białystok	Lubin
17:30				Stadium: Lubin Stadium; Attendance: 5,860; Referee: Szymon Marciniak

6 December 2025 18	Bruk-Bet Termalica Nieciecza	2–1	Jagiellonia Białystok	Nieciecza
12:15	Drachal 25' (o.g.); Zapolnik 77'		Vital 40'	Stadium: Stadion Sportowy Bruk-Bet Termalica; Attendance: 3,960; Referee: Jarosław Przybył

14 December 2025 3	Motor Lublin	1–1	Jagiellonia Białystok	Lublin
17:30	Czubak 44' (pen.)		Pululu 39'	Stadium: Arena Lublin; Referee: Tomasz Kwiatkowski

31 January 2026 19	Widzew Łódź	1–3	Jagiellonia Białystok	Łódź
17:30	Bergier 89' (pen.)		Mazurek 36'; Pululu 55' (pen.); Wojtuszek 80'	Stadium: Widzew Łódź Stadium; Attendance: 16,645; Referee: Paweł Raczkowski

7 February 2026 20	Jagiellonia Białystok	4–1	Motor Lublin	Białystok
17:30	Pululu 13'; Baždar 72'; Imaz 76'; Romanczuk 90+2'		Ndiaye 31'	Stadium: Białystok Stadium; Attendance: 14,176; Referee: Patryk Gryckiewicz

14 February 2026 21	Cracovia	0–0	Jagiellonia Białystok	Kraków
18:00				Stadium: Józef Piłsudski Cracovia Stadium; Attendance: 10,101; Referee: Piotr Lasyk

21 February 2026 22	Jagiellonia Białystok	1–1	Radomiak Radom	Białystok
14:45	Imaz 64'		Wolski 55'	Stadium: Białystok Stadium; Attendance: 13,021; Referee: Damian Sylwestrzak

1 March 2026 23	Jagiellonia Białystok	2–2	Legia Warsaw	Białystok
14:45	Flach 17'; Pululu 22'		Vital 45+1' (o.g.); Flach 56' (o.g.)	Stadium: Białystok Stadium; Attendance: 20,048; Referee: Karol Arys

7 March 2026 24	Lechia Gdańsk	3–0	Jagiellonia Białystok	Gdańsk
20:30	Kapić 43'; Ćirković 81', 90+4'			Stadium: Gdańsk Stadium; Referee: Piotr Lasyk

14 March 2026 25	Jagiellonia Białystok	1–2	Piast Gliwice	Białystok
14:45	Imaz 82'		Vallejo 21', 66'	Stadium: Białystok Stadium; Attendance: 16,580; Referee: Marcin Szczerbowicz

17 March 2026 16	Jagiellonia Białystok	2–1	GKS Katowice	Białystok
19:00	Pozo 11'; Romanczuk 45'		Jirka 82'	Stadium: Białystok Stadium; Attendance: 14,081; Referee: Wojciech Myć

21 March 2026 26	Jagiellonia Białystok	1–2	Wisła Płock	Białystok
20:15	Baždar 11'		Jurić 20', 33'	Stadium: Białystok Stadium; Attendance: 15,027; Referee: Piotr Lasyk

4 April 2026 27	Jagiellonia Białystok	0–0	Lech Poznań	Białystok
18:00				Stadium: Białystok Stadium; Attendance: 19,789; Referee: Jarosław Przybył

11 April 2026 28	Korona Kielce	1–1	Jagiellonia Białystok	Kielce
20:30	Remacle 22'		Pululu 29' (pen.)	Stadium: Kielce Municipal Stadium; Referee: Paweł Malec

18 April 2026 29	Arka Gdynia	0–3	Jagiellonia Białystok	Gdynia
17:30			Imaz 9', 38'; Baždar 73'	Stadium: Stadion GOSiR; Attendance: 10,989; Referee: Wojciech Myć

25 April 2026 30	Jagiellonia Białystok	1–2	Górnik Zabrze	Białystok
20:30	Pululu 90+3'		Mazurek 64' (o.g.); Janicki 90+8' (pen.)	Stadium: Białystok Stadium; Attendance: 19,015; Referee: Tomasz Kwiatkowski

13 May 2026 31	Raków Częstochowa	0–2	Jagiellonia Białystok	Częstochowa
20:30			Kobayashi 34'; Szmyt 82'	Stadium: Raków Municipal Stadium; Attendance: 5,500; Referee: Szymon Marciniak

9 May 2026 32	Jagiellonia Białystok	3–2	Pogoń Szczecin	Białystok
17:30	Szmyt 11'; Pululu 32'; Vital 90+1'		Čuić 44'; Agger 83'	Stadium: Białystok Stadium; Attendance: 19,775; Referee: Wojciech Myć

16 May 2026 33	GKS Katowice	2–2	Jagiellonia Białystok	Katowice
14:45	Nowak 3'; Galán 78'		Vital 31'; Pululu 56' (pen.)	Stadium: Arena Katowice; Attendance: 14,651; Referee: Paweł Raczkowski

23 May 2026 34	Jagiellonia Białystok	2–0	Zagłębie Lubin	Białystok
17:30	Pululu 32' (pen.)			Stadium: Białystok Stadium; Referee: Wojciech Myć

=== Polish Cup ===
==== Matches ====
30 October 2025 Round of 32	Miedź Legnica	2–3	Jagiellonia Białystok	Legnica
15:00 CET	Pozo 36' (o.g.); Mansfeld 90+2'	Report	Polak 11'; Lozano 70', 75'	Stadium: White Eagle Municipal Stadium; Attendance: 2,812; Referee: Sebastian Krasny

4 December 2025 Round of 16	GKS Katowice	3–1	Jagiellonia Białystok	Katowice
17:00	Nowak 45+1', 90+5'; Shkurin 51'	Report	Pululu 86' (pen.)	Stadium: Arena Katowice; Attendance: 6,076; Referee: Wojciech Myć

=== UEFA Conference League ===
==== Second qualifying round ====
The draw was held on 18 June 2025.

24 July 2025 First leg	Novi Pazar (Serbia)	1–2	(Poland) Jagiellonia Białystok	Novi Pazar, Serbia
19:00 CEST	Opara 19'; Davidović (red card)		Rallis 9'; Pululu 90+5'	Stadium: Novi Pazar City Stadium; Attendance: 9,000; Referee: Matthew de Gabriele (Malta)

31 July 2025 Second leg	Jagiellonia Białystok (Poland)	3–1 (5–2 agg.)	(Serbia) Novi Pazar	Białystok
20:15 CEST	Pululu 50', 73' (pen.); Romanczuk 90+4'		Abdullahi 85'	Stadium: Białystok Stadium; Attendance: 16,128; Referee: Atilla Karaoğlan (Türkiye)

==== Third qualifying round ====
7 August 2025 First leg	Silkeborg (Denmark)	0–1	(Poland) Jagiellonia Białystok	Silkeborg, Denmark
19:00 CEST		Report	Vital 15'	Stadium: JYSK Park; Attendance: 4,289; Referee: Jamie Robinson (Northern Ireland)

14 August 2025 Second leg	Jagiellonia Białystok (Poland)	2–2 (3–2 agg.)	(Denmark) Silkeborg	Białystok
20:15 CEST	Imaz 29', 35'	Report	Berger 87'; Gammelby 90+4'	Stadium: Białystok Stadium; Attendance: 17,369; Referee: Eric Wattellier (France)

==== Play-off round ====
21 August 2025 First leg	Jagiellonia Białystok (Poland)	3–0	(Albania) Dinamo City	Białystok
20:15 CEST	Imaz 12'; Pululu 34'; Wojtuszek 50'	Report		Stadium: Białystok Stadium; Attendance: 17,450; Referee: Marian Alexandru Barbu (Romania)

28 August 2025 Second leg	Dinamo City (Albania)	1–1 (4–1 agg.)	(Poland) Jagiellonia Białystok	Tirana, Albania
20:45 CEST	Bregu 68'	Report	Rallis 79'	Stadium: Arena Kombëtare; Attendance: 2,644; Referee: Goga Kikacheishvili (Georgia)

==== League phase ====
Pos	Team	Pld	W	D	L	GF	GA	GD	Pts	Qualification
15	(Italian Football Federation) Fiorentina	6	3	0	3	8	5	+3	9	Advance to knockout phase play-offs (seeded)
16	(Croatian Football Federation) Rijeka	6	2	3	1	5	2	+3	9	Advance to knockout phase play-offs (seeded)
17	(Polish Football Association) Jagiellonia Białystok	6	2	3	1	5	4	+1	9	Advance to knockout phase play-offs (unseeded)
18	(Cyprus Football Association) Omonia	6	2	2	2	5	4	+1	8	Advance to knockout phase play-offs (unseeded)
19	(Football Federation of Armenia) Noah	6	2	2	2	6	7	−1	8	Advance to knockout phase play-offs (unseeded)

Source: UEFA
Rules for classification: League phase tiebreakers

2 October 2025 1	Jagiellonia Białystok (Poland)	1–0	(Malta) Hamrun Spartans	Białystok
18:45 CEST	Imaz 57'			Stadium: Białystok Stadium; Attendance: 17,469; Referee: Igor Stojčevski (North Macedonia)

23 October 2025 2	Strasbourg (France)	1–1	(Poland) Jagiellonia Białystok	Strasbourg, France
18:45 CEST	Panichelli 79'		Stojinović 52'	Stadium: Stade de la Meinau; Attendance: 21,748; Referee: Dario Bel (Croatia)

6 November 2025 3	Shkëndija (North Macedonia)	1–1	(Poland) Jagiellonia Białystok	Skopje, North Macedonia
21:00 CET	Latifi 49'		Imaz (red card) 90+8'; Lozano 90+10'	Stadium: Toše Proeski Arena; Attendance: 2,411; Referee: Mihály Káprály (Hungary)

27 November 2025 4	Jagiellonia Białystok (Poland)	1–0	(Finland) KuPS	Białystok
21:00 CET	Pululu 51'			Stadium: Białystok Stadium; Attendance: 12,369; Referee: Gustavo Correia (Portugal)

11 December 2025 5	Jagiellonia Białystok (Poland)	1–2	(Spain) Rayo Vallecano	Białystok
18:45 CET	Imaz 44'		Camello 6'; Espino 61'	Stadium: Białystok Stadium; Attendance: 17,534; Referee: Edgars Maļcevs (Latvia)

18 December 2025 6	AZ Alkmaar (Netherlands)	0–0	(Poland) Jagiellonia Białystok	Alkmaar, Netherlands
21:00 CET			Pululu (red card) 64'	Stadium: AFAS Stadion; Attendance: 13,017; Referee: Stefan Ebner (Austria)

==== Knockout phase ====
===== Knockout phase play-offs =====
The draw for the knockout phase play-offs was held on 16 January 2026.

19 February 2025 First leg	Jagiellonia Białystok (Poland)	0–3	(Italy) Fiorentina	Białystok, Poland
21:00 CET		Report	Ranieri 53'; Mandragora 65'; Piccoli 81' (pen.)	Stadium: Białystok Stadium; Attendance: 18,531; Referee: Sebastian Gishamer (Austria)

26 February 2025 Second leg	Fiorentina (Italy)	2–4 (a.e.t.) (5–4 agg.)	(Poland) Jagiellonia Białystok	Florence, Italy
18:45 CET	Fagioli 107'; Romanczuk 114' (o.g.)	Report	Mazurek 23', 45+3', 49'; Imaz 118'; Vital (red card) 120'	Stadium: Stadio Artemio Franchi; Attendance: 9,341; Referee: Srđan Jovanović (Serbia)

== Statistics ==
=== Goalscorers ===
Rank	Pos.	Player	Ekstraklasa	Polish Cup	Conference League	Total
1	FW	(Angola) Afimico Pululu	15	1	5	21
2	FW	(Spain) Jesús Imaz	14	0	4	18
3	MF	(Spain) Sergio Lozano	3	2	1	6
4	FW	(Greece) Dimitris Rallis	3	0	2	5
5	MF	(Poland) Bartosz Mazurek	1	0	3	4
5	MF	(Poland) Taras Romanczuk	3	0	1	4
5	DF	(Portugal) Bernardo Vital	3	0	1	4
8	FW	(Bosnia and Herzegovina) Samed Baždar	3	0	0	3
9	DF	(Poland) Norbert Wojtuszek	1	0	1	2
9	DF	(Spain) Alejandro Pozo	2	0	0	2
Totals			48	3	18	69
