= List of Polish football transfers winter 2025–26 =

This is a list of Polish football transfers for the 2025–26 winter transfer window. Only transfers featuring Ekstraklasa are listed.

== Ekstraklasa ==
Note: Flags indicate national team as has been defined under FIFA eligibility rules. Players may hold more than one non-FIFA nationality.

=== Lech Poznań ===
In:

No.	Pos.	Nation	Player
1	GK	BUL	Plamen Andreev (on loan from (Netherlands) Feyenoord, previously on loan at (Spain) Racing Santander)

Out:

No.	Pos.	Nation	Player
19	FW	NOR	Bryan Fiabema (on loan to (Netherlands) ADO Den Haag)
21	MF	POL	Bartłomiej Barański (on loan to GKS Tychy)
31	GK	POL	Krzysztof Bąkowski (on loan to (Norway) KFUM)
—	DF	USA	Ian Hoffmann (on loan to (Norway) HamKam, previously on loan at (Norway) Kristiansund)

=== Raków Częstochowa ===
In:

No.	Pos.	Nation	Player
22	MF	NGA	Abraham Ojo (from (Bulgaria) Botev Plovdiv)
27	DF	POL	Paweł Dawidowicz (free agent)
29	GK	POL	Wiktor Żołneczko (from Rekord Bielsko-Biała)
35	DF	SVN	Mitja Ilenič (on loan from (United States) New York City)
39	FW	SWE	Isak Brusberg (from (Sweden) Häcken)

Out:

No.	Pos.	Nation	Player
39	GK	POL	Jakub Mądrzyk (to GKS Tychy)
66	DF	GRE	Apostolos Konstantopoulos (to Jagiellonia Białystok)
88	MF	HUN	Péter Baráth (to (Czech Republic) Sigma Olomouc)
97	MF	SEN	Ibrahima Seck (on loan to (Lithuania) Sūduva)
99	FW	BIH	Imad Rondić (loan return to (Germany) 1. FC Köln)
—	GK	BIH	Muhamed Šahinović (on loan to (Croatia) Gorica, previously on loan at (Slovenia) Koper)
—	GK	POL	Jakub Rajczykowski (on loan to Polonia Bytom, previously on loan at Świt Szczecin)
—	MF	POL	Antoni Burkiewicz (on loan to Podhale Nowy Targ, previously on loan at Polonia Bytom)
—	FW	POL	Adam Basse (on loan to Hutnik Kraków, previously on loan at Puszcza Niepołomice)

=== Jagiellonia Białystok ===
In:

No.	Pos.	Nation	Player
14	FW	BIH	Samed Baždar (on loan from (Spain) Real Zaragoza)
19	MF	ESP	Matías Nahuel (on loan from (Israel) Maccabi Haifa)
23	DF	POR	Guilherme Montóia (from (Portugal) Estrela da Amadora)
44	DF	GRE	Apostolos Konstantopoulos (from Raków Częstochowa)
77	MF	POL	Kajetan Szmyt (from Zagłębie Lubin)

Out:

No.	Pos.	Nation	Player
5	DF	POL	Cezary Polak (on loan to Miedź Legnica)
18	FW	DEN	Louka Prip (to (Denmark) Hvidovre)
19	MF	ESP	Álex Cantero (to (Spain) Huesca)
25	MF	USA	Aziel Jackson (on loan to (Canada) Vancouver Whitecaps)
29	MF	POL	Marcin Listkowski (to GKS Tychy)
55	FW	JPN	Tōki Hirosawa (on loan to KKS Kalisz)
80	MF	POL	Oskar Pietuszewski (to (Portugal) Porto)

=== Pogoń Szczecin ===
In:

No.	Pos.	Nation	Player
3	MF	USA	Kellyn Acosta (from (United States) Chicago Fire)
10	FW	BIH	Filip Čuić (from (Croatia) Gorica)
20	MF	POL	Igor Brzyski (from (Italy) Torino Primavera)
24	FW	POL	Karol Angielski (from (Cyprus) AEK Larnaca)
25	FW	DEN	Mads Agger (from (Denmark) Sønderjyske)
41	DF	HUN	Attila Szalai (on loan from (Germany) TSG Hoffenheim, previously on loan at (Turkey) Kasımpaşa)

Out:

No.	Pos.	Nation	Player
2	DF	POR	Marian Huja (on loan to (Romania) CFR Cluj)
10	MF	POL	Adrian Przyborek (to (Italy) Lazio)
17	DF	POL	Jakub Lis (to Chrobry Głogów)
20	FW	POL	Patryk Paryzek (on loan to Górnik Łęczna)
35	MF	POL	Maciej Wojciechowski (on loan to ŁKS Łódź)
36	DF	POL	Jakub Zawadzki (on loan to Świt Szczecin)
55	FW	BRA	Renyer (free agent)
99	FW	POL	Kacper Kostorz (to Polonia Warsaw)

=== Legia Warsaw ===
In:

No.	Pos.	Nation	Player
9	FW	POL	Rafał Adamski (from Pogoń Grodzisk Mazowiecki)
89	GK	ROU	Otto Hindrich (from (Romania) CFR Cluj)

Out:

No.	Pos.	Nation	Player
3	DF	COD	Steve Kapuadi (to Widzew Łódź)
4	DF	SUI	Marco Burch (to (Switzerland) Servette)
31	GK	POL	Marcel Mendes-Dudziński (on loan to Świt Szczecin)
50	GK	POL	Wojciech Banasik (on loan to Polonia Bytom)
99	MF	GER	Noah Weißhaupt (loan return to (Germany) SC Freiburg)

=== Cracovia ===
In:

No.	Pos.	Nation	Player
5	MF	SVN	Beno Selan (from (Slovenia) Bravo)
9	FW	POL	Wiktor Bogacz (on loan from (United States) New York Red Bulls)
10	MF	SUI	Maxime Dominguez (from (Brazil) Vasco da Gama, previously on loan at (Canada) Toronto FC)
11	FW	ESP	Pau Sans (on loan from (Spain) Real Zaragoza)
29	FW	CMR	Jean Batoum (from (Israel) Ashdod)
39	DF	CRO	Mauro Perković (from (Croatia) Dinamo Zagreb, previously on loan)

Out:

No.	Pos.	Nation	Player
8	MF	SRB	Milan Aleksić (loan return to (England) Sunderland)
9	FW	SUI	Filip Stojilković (to (Italy) Pisa)
10	MF	POL	Michał Rakoczy (to Górnik Zabrze)
11	MF	DEN	Mikkel Maigaard (to Wieczysta Kraków)
19	DF	ISL	Davíð Kristján Ólafsson (to (Greece) AEL)
22	DF	POL	Bartosz Biedrzycki (on loan to Górnik Łęczna)
24	DF	CZE	Jakub Jugas (to (Czech Republic) Zlín)

=== Motor Lublin ===
In:

No.	Pos.	Nation	Player
29	DF	DEN	Thomas Santos (from (Sweden) Göteborg)

Out:

No.	Pos.	Nation	Player
47	DF	POL	Krystian Palacz (to Odra Opole)

=== GKS Katowice ===
In:

No.	Pos.	Nation	Player
14	DF	NOR	Marius Olsen (from (Norway) Kristiansund)
26	MF	POL	Damian Rasak (on loan from (Hungary) Újpest)
70	MF	POL	Mateusz Wdowiak (from Zagłębie Lubin)
97	FW	SVK	Erik Jirka (from Piast Gliwice)

Out:

No.	Pos.	Nation	Player
7	FW	POL	Maciej Rosołek (on loan to Pogoń Siedlce)
14	MF	POL	Jakub Łukowski (to Polonia Bytom)

=== Górnik Zabrze ===
In:

No.	Pos.	Nation	Player
4	DF	POL	Paweł Bochniewicz (from (Netherlands) Heerenveen)
7	FW	FRA	Yvan Ikia Dimi (from (France) Amiens)
11	MF	FRA	Brandon Domingues (on loan from (Spain) Real Oviedo)
13	MF	CZE	Lukáš Sadílek (from (Czech Republic) Sparta Prague)
21	MF	DEN	Mathias Sauer (from (Norway) Egersund)
36	MF	POL	Michał Rakoczy (from Cracovia)
67	DF	CZE	Ondřej Zmrzlý (on loan from (Czech Republic) Slavia Prague)
77	FW	BUL	Borislav Rupanov (from (Bulgaria) Levski Sofia)
—	MF	POL	Ksawery Semik (from Hutnik Kraków)

Out:

No.	Pos.	Nation	Player
7	FW	SVK	Luka Zahović (to (Romania) CFR Cluj)
9	FW	BRA	Gabriel Barbosa (on loan to (Slovakia) Tatran Prešov)
19	MF	POL	Natan Dzięgielewski (on loan to Wieczysta Kraków)
22	MF	NGA	Abbati Abdullahi (on loan to (Slovakia) Skalica)
27	DF	POL	Dominik Szala (on loan to Stal Mielec)
30	FW	SEN	Ousmane Sow (to (Sweden) Brøndby)
55	DF	POL	Maksymilian Pingot (on loan to ŁKS Łódź)
79	MF	KOR	Goh Young-jun (on loan to (South Korea) Gangwon)
81	DF	SVK	Matúš Kmeť (loan return to (United States) Minnesota United)
—	MF	POL	Ksawery Semik (on loan to Hutnik Kraków)
—	DF	POL	Dawid Mazurek (on loan to Rekord Bielsko-Biała, previously on loan at Stal Mielec)
—	FW	GRE	Theodoros Tsirigotis (on loan to (Finland) TPS, previously on loan at Polonia Bytom)

=== Piast Gliwice ===
In:

No.	Pos.	Nation	Player
3	DF	ALB	Elton Fikaj (from (Greece) Panathinaikos)
90	FW	POR	Ivan Lima (from (Portugal) Benfica B)
—	GK	SVK	Dominik Holec (from (Czech Republic) Baník Ostrava)

Out:

No.	Pos.	Nation	Player
15	DF	POL	Levis Pitan (on loan to (Scotland) Ross County)
19	MF	POL	Kamil Lubowiecki (on loan to GKS Jastrzębie)
77	FW	SVK	Erik Jirka (to GKS Katowice)
79	GK	POL	Dawid Rychta (on loan to KS CK Troszyn)

=== Korona Kielce ===
In:

No.	Pos.	Nation	Player
14	FW	POL	Mariusz Stępiński (from (Cyprus) Omonia)
86	MF	SWE	Simon Gustafson (from (Sweden) Häcken)

Out:

No.	Pos.	Nation	Player
13	MF	POL	Miłosz Strzeboński (on loan to Resovia)
16	MF	POL	Jakub Kowalski (on loan to Stal Mielec)
61	DF	POL	Jakub Budnicki (on loan to Polonia Warsaw)

=== Radomiak Radom ===
In:

No.	Pos.	Nation	Player
19	FW	GUI	Salifou Soumah (on loan from (Sweden) Malmö)
82	MF	BRA	Luquinhas (from (Portugal) Santa Clara)

Out:

No.	Pos.	Nation	Player
11	FW	ANG	Capita (to (United States) Sporting Kansas City)
12	GK	POL	Krystian Harciński (to Stal Stalowa Wola)
29	FW	ANG	Depú (to (Tanzania) Young Africans)
—	MF	LTU	Paulius Golubickas (to (Lithuania) Žalgiris, previously on loan at (Finland) KuPS)

=== Widzew Łódź ===
In:

No.	Pos.	Nation	Player
1	GK	POL	Bartłomiej Drągowski (from (Greece) Panathinaikos)
2	DF	ESP	Carlos Isaac (from (Spain) Córdoba)
8	MF	DEN	Emil Kornvig (from (Norway) Brann)
17	DF	NOR	Christopher Cheng (from (Norway) Sandefjord)
21	MF	DEN	Lukas Lerager (from (Denmark) Copenhagen)
22	FW	GHA	Osman Bukari (from (United States) Austin FC)
25	DF	POL	Przemysław Wiśniewski (from (Italy) Spezia)
53	DF	COD	Steve Kapuadi (from Legia Warsaw)

Out:

No.	Pos.	Nation	Player
8	MF	CRO	Tonio Teklić (on loan to (Croatia) Osijek)
13	DF	KOS	Dion Gallapeni (on loan to Wisła Płock)
16	DF	DEN	Peter Therkildsen (free agent)
20	FW	POL	Antoni Klukowski (on loan to Polonia Warsaw)
24	DF	GRE	Polydefkis Volanakis (to (Slovakia) Zemplín Michalovce)
25	MF	CZE	Marek Hanousek (to (Czech Republic) Dukla Prague)
27	FW	SEN	Pape Meïssa Ba (on loan to (France) Red Star)
42	FW	POL	Kamil Andrzejkiewicz (free agent)
57	MF	NGA	Samuel Akere (on loan to (Croatia) Osijek)
78	MF	POL	Kamil Cybulski (on loan to Stal Mielec)
—	DF	POL	Paweł Kwiatkowski (on loan to Warta Poznań, previously on loan at Stal Mielec)
—	MF	POL	Kajetan Radomski (on loan to MKS Kluczbork, previously on loan at Stal Stalowa Wola)

=== Lechia Gdańsk ===
In:

No.	Pos.	Nation	Player
49	MF	POL	Igor Bambecki (from Polonia Nysa)
76	DF	KOS	Indrit Mavraj (from (Italy) Bari)

Out:

No.	Pos.	Nation	Player
3	DF	SWE	Elias Olsson (on loan to Wieczysta Kraków)
6	MF	SWE	Karl Wendt (on loan to (Sweden) Öster)
26	DF	POL	Bartosz Brzęk (to Olimpia Grudziądz)
42	MF	POL	Adam Kardaś (to Olimpia Grudziądz)
72	FW	UAE	Mohamed Awad Alla (loan return to (United Arab Emirates) Al Ain)
88	MF	POL	Bartosz Szczepankiewicz (on loan to Sokół Kleczew)
—	DF	POL	Marcel Bajko (to GKS Wikielec, previously on loan)

=== Zagłębie Lubin ===
In:

No.	Pos.	Nation	Player
7	MF	POL	Sebastian Kowalczyk (from (United States) Houston Dynamo)
17	FW	HUN	Levente Szabó (from (Germany) Eintracht Braunschweig)
88	FW	CRO	Mihael Mlinarić (from (Bosnia and Herzegovina) Sarajevo)

Out:

No.	Pos.	Nation	Player
2	DF	POL	Kamil Sochań (on loan to Podbeskidzie)
7	MF	POL	Marek Mróz (to Polonia Warsaw)
14	MF	SWE	Ludvig Fritzson (free agent)
15	MF	POL	Hubert Adamczyk (to Pogoń Grodzisk Mazowiecki)
17	MF	POL	Mateusz Wdowiak (to GKS Katowice)
23	MF	POL	Patryk Kusztal (on loan to Warta Poznań)
55	FW	POR	Leonardo Rocha (loan return to Raków Częstochowa)
71	MF	POL	Kamil Nowogoński (on loan to Górnik Łęczna)
77	MF	POL	Kajetan Szmyt (to Jagiellonia Białystok)

=== Arka Gdynia ===
In:

No.	Pos.	Nation	Player
3	DF	POL	Serafin Szota (from Śląsk Wrocław)
19	FW	LVA	Vladislavs Gutkovskis (from (South Korea) Daejeon Hana Citizen)
—	GK	ROU	Andrei Vlad (free agent)

Out:

No.	Pos.	Nation	Player
7	FW	POL	Szymon Sobczak (to Zagłębie Sosnowiec)
14	MF	JPN	Hide Vitalucci (on loan to Polonia Warsaw)
16	MF	POL	Adam Ratajczyk (to Widzew Łódź II)
17	MF	POL	Marcel Predenkiewicz (to Zagłębie Sosnowiec)
18	DF	FRA	Julien Célestine (to (South Korea) Jeju SK)
22	FW	ESP	Diego Percan (to (Spain) Córdoba)
32	DF	POL	Przemysław Stolc (to Olimpia Grudziądz)
—	GK	POL	Paweł Depka (on loan to Cartusia Kartuzy, previously on loan at GKS Wikielec)

=== Bruk-Bet Termalica ===
In:

No.	Pos.	Nation	Player
19	FW	CRO	Ivan Durdov (from (Slovenia) Olimpija Ljubljana)
32	DF	POL	Miłosz Matysik (on loan from (Cyprus) Aris Limassol)

Out:

No.	Pos.	Nation	Player
16	DF	POL	Miłosz Kozik (on loan to Podbeskidzie)
35	FW	GEO	Diego Deisadze (to (Georgia (country)) Torpedo Kutaisi)
55	DF	BRA	Thiago Dombroski (on loan to (Brazil) Paraná)
70	GK	POL	Eric Topór (on loan to Stal Kraśnik)
—	DF	POL	Jakub Marcinkowski (on loan to Stal Kraśnik)
—	MF	POL	Jakub Różycki (on loan to Pogoń Nowe Skalmierzyce, previously on loan at KKS Kalisz)
—	FW	POL	Jakub Branecki (on loan to Sokół Kleczew, previously on loan at Chełmianka Chełm)

=== Wisła Płock ===
In:

No.	Pos.	Nation	Player
5	DF	CRO	Marin Karamarko (from (Bosnia and Herzegovina) Željezničar)
18	MF	POL	Dominik Sarapata (on loan from (Denmark) Copenhagen)
19	DF	KOS	Dion Gallapeni (on loan from Widzew Łódź)
37	DF	BLR	Matvey Bokhno (from Lech Poznań II)
77	FW	BIH	Said Hamulić (from (France) Toulouse, previously on loan at (Greece) Volos)
88	MF	GRE	Kyriakos Savvidis (from (Slovakia) Slovan Bratislava)

Out:

No.	Pos.	Nation	Player
3	DF	GEO	Aleksandre Kalandadze (to (Georgia (country)) Dinamo Tbilisi)
5	DF	BIH	Bojan Nastić (to (Bosnia and Herzegovina) Željezničar)
19	DF	FRO	Andrias Edmundsson (to (Italy) Hellas Verona)
22	FW	POL	Piotr Krawczyk (to GKS Tychy)
37	FW	POL	Oskar Tomczyk (to Podbeskidzie)

== See also ==
- 2025–26 Ekstraklasa
