= Yuki Kobayashi (footballer, born 2000) =

Japanese association football player

Yuki Kobayashi 小林 友希
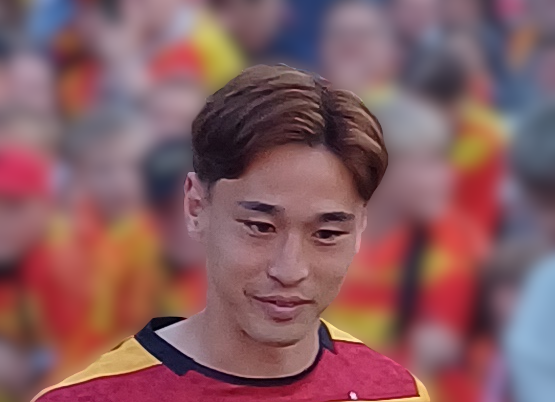
- Kobayashi in 2025

Personal information
- Full name: Yuki Kobayashi
- Date of birth: 18 July 2000 (age 26)
- Place of birth: Hyogo, Japan
- Height: 1.85 m (6 ft 1 in)
- Position: Centre-back

Team information
- Current team: Jagiellonia Białystok
- Number: 4

Youth career
- 2010–2018: Vissel Kobe

Senior career*
Years	Team	Apps	(Gls)
2018–2022	Vissel Kobe	56	(0)
2019	→ Machida Zelvia (loan)	15	(0)
2020	→ Yokohama FC (loan)	28	(2)
2023–2024	Celtic	5	(0)
2024–2025	Portimonense	25	(0)
2025–	Jagiellonia Białystok	20	(2)
2026–	Jagiellonia Białystok II	3	(0)

International career
- Japan U17
2019	Japan U20	5	(0)
Medal record
Representing Japan
AFC U-19 Championship
Bronze medal – third place	2018
- * Club domestic league appearances and goals as of 18:58, 20 September 2026 (UTC)

Yuki Kobayashi (小林 友希, Kobayashi Yūki; born 18 July 2000) is a Japanese professional footballer who plays as a centre-back for Ekstraklasa club Jagiellonia Białystok.

== Career ==
=== Vissel Kobe ===
Kobayashi joined J1 League club Vissel Kobe from its youth team in 2018.

=== Celtic ===
On 23 November 2022, it was announced that Kobayashi would join Scottish club Celtic on a five-year deal, becoming available for registration on 1 January 2023. On 18 January 2023, he made his debut for the club starting in a 4–0 victory against St Mirren in the Scottish Premiership.

=== Portimonense ===
On 24 August 2024, Kobayashi joined Portimonense.

=== Jagiellonia Białystok ===
On 3 July 2025, Kobayashi moved to Polish club Jagiellonia Białystok on a three-year deal, with an option for a fourth year.

== Personal life ==
Kobayashi was born in Hyogo Prefecture.

== Career statistics ==
As of match played 3 September 2026

Appearances and goals by club, season and competition
Club	Season	League			National cup (Note: Includes Emperor's Cup, Scottish Cup, Taça de Portugal)		League cup (Note: Includes J.League Cup, Scottish League Cup)		Continental		Total	
Club	Season	Division	Apps	Goals	Apps	Goals	Apps	Goals	Apps	Goals	Apps	Goals
Vissel Kobe	2018	J1 League	2	0	0	0	2	0	—		4	0
Vissel Kobe	2019	J1 League	0	0	0	0	1	0	—		1	0
Vissel Kobe	2021	J1 League	22	0	2	1	8	0	—		32	1
Vissel Kobe	2022	J1 League	32	0	3	0	0	0	6 (Note: Appearances in AFC Champions League)	0	41	0
Vissel Kobe	Total		56	0	5	1	11	0	6	0	78	1
Machida Zelvia (loan)	2019	J2 League	15	0	0	0	—		—		15	0
Yokohama FC (loan)	2020	J1 League	28	2	0	0	2	0	—		30	2
Celtic	2022–23	Scottish Premiership	5	0	2	0	0	0	0	0	7	0
Celtic	2023–24	Scottish Premiership	0	0	0	0	0	0	0	0	0	0
Celtic	Total		5	0	2	0	0	0	0	0	7	0
Portimonense	2024–25	Liga Portugal 2	25	0	1	0	—		—		26	0
Jagiellonia Białystok	2025–26	Ekstraklasa	15	1	0	0	—		8 (Note: Appearances in UEFA Conference League)	0	23	1
Jagiellonia Białystok	2026–27	Ekstraklasa	5	1	0	0	—		4 (Note: Appearances in UEFA Europa League)	0	9	1
Jagiellonia Białystok	Total		20	2	0	0	—		12	0	32	2
Jagiellonia Białystok II	2025–26	III liga, group I	3	0	—		—		—		3	0
Career total			152	4	8	1	13	0	18	0	191	5

== Honours ==
Celtic

- Scottish Premiership: 2022–23
- Scottish Cup: 2022–23
