= Dawid Drachal =

Polish footballer (born 2005)

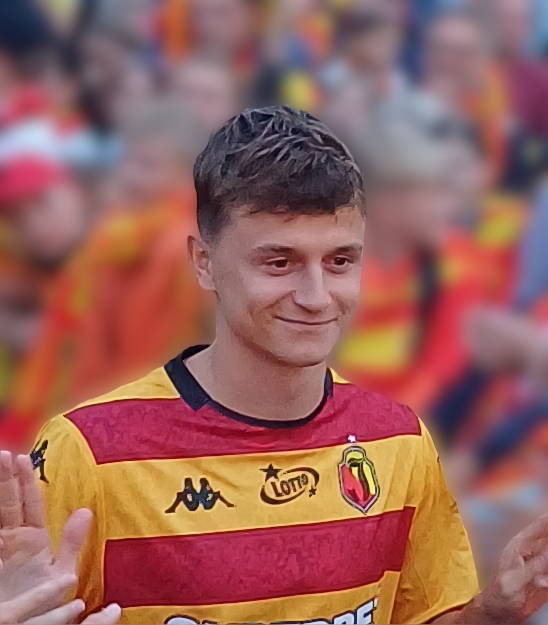
- Drachal with Jagiellonia Białystok in 2025

Personal information
- Date of birth: 31 January 2005 (age 21)
- Place of birth: Radom, Poland
- Height: 1.82 m (6 ft 0 in)
- Position: Attacking midfielder

Team information
- Current team: Jagiellonia Białystok
- Number: 8

Youth career
- 2014–2015: Broń Radom
- 2015–2016: Ajax Radom
- 2017–2019: Broń Radom
- 2019–2021: Escola Varsovia

Senior career*
Years	Team	Apps	(Gls)
2021–2022	Escola Varsovia	7	(1)
2022	Miedź Legnica II	4	(2)
2022–2023	Miedź Legnica	16	(1)
2023–2025	Raków Częstochowa	36	(4)
2023	Raków Częstochowa II	1	(0)
2025	→ GKS Katowice (loan)	14	(0)
2025	→ GKS Katowice II (loan)	1	(1)
2025–	Jagiellonia Białystok	23	(1)
2026–	Jagiellonia Białystok II	2	(0)

International career^{‡}
2021–2022	Poland U17	9	(1)
2023	Poland U18	2	(0)
2023	Poland U19	5	(2)
2024	Poland U20	5	(0)
2025–	Poland U21	10	(0)
- * Club domestic league appearances and goals as of 17:32, 20 September 2026 (UTC) ‡ National team caps and goals as of 21:25, 19 November 2026 (UTC)

Dawid Drachal (born 31 January 2005) is a Polish professional footballer who plays as an attacking midfielder for Ekstraklasa club Jagiellonia Białystok.

== Club career ==
=== Early years ===
Born in Radom, Drachal started his youth career with Broń Radom at the age of nine. He then moved to Ajax Radom for a year, before returning to Broń in early 2017. In 2019, he joined Escola Varsovia.

=== Miedź Legnica ===
After undergoing a trial with German club Bayer Leverkusen in the summer, Drachal signed a three-year contract with Ekstraklasa club Miedź Legnica on 31 August 2022. He made his senior team debut on 2 October 2022 in a 0–2 loss against Stal Mielec, before suffering a broken bone only a few days later. He scored his first and only goal for Miedź's senior team on 1 May 2023 in a 1–1 league draw against Cracovia. He made a total of 16 top tier appearances that year; despite his efforts, Miedź suffered relegation at the end of the season.

=== Raków Częstochowa ===
In June 2023, he was transferred to defending Ekstraklasa champions Raków Częstochowa, signing a five-year contract. After a single outing with Raków's reserve side, he made his first team on 19 August in a 2–0 win over Stal Mielec. On 24 September 2023, he scored three goals in less than 22 minutes of a 3–5 away victory against Ruch Chorzów, thus becoming the youngest player to score a hat-trick in the first half of a match at the highest level of league competition in Poland since Ernst Wilimowski on 30 September 1934.

==== Loan to GKS Katowice ====
On 5 February 2025, Drachal was sent on loan to fellow Ekstraklasa club GKS Katowice for the remainder of the season.

=== Jagiellonia Białystok ===
On 13 June 2023, Drachal was transferred to league rivals Jagiellonia Białystok. He signed a three-year deal with an option for a further year.

== International career ==
He was called up for the 2022 UEFA European Under-17 Championship, where he played in all three group stage matches: a 1–6 loss against France, in which he scored a goal, a 1–2 loss to the Netherlands and a 1–1 draw against Bulgaria. Poland was eliminated from the competition after finishing their group in third place.

On 17 October 2023, he scored twice in a 3–3 2024 UEFA Euro Under-19 qualifying draw against Germany.

On 22 March 2024, Drachal made his debut for the Poland U20 in a 1–5 Elite League defeat against England U20.

In May 2024, he received his first under-21 call-up for a friendly against North Macedonia on 1 June 2024.

== Personal life ==
As a child, he practiced breakdancing. His father, Andrzej, was also a footballer.

== Career statistics ==
As of match played 20 September 2026

Appearances and goals by club, season and competition
Club	Season	League			Polish Cup		Europe		Other		Total	
Club	Season	Division	Apps	Goals	Apps	Goals	Apps	Goals	Apps	Goals	Apps	Goals
Escola Varsovia	2021–22	IV liga Masovia I	7	1	—		—		—		7	1
Miedź Legnica II	2022–23	III liga, gr. III	4	2	—		—		—		4	2
Miedź Legnica	2022–23	Ekstraklasa	16	1	0	0	—		—		16	1
Raków Częstochowa	2023–24	Ekstraklasa	26	3	3	0	0	0	0	0	29	3
Raków Częstochowa	2024–25	Ekstraklasa	10	1	1	0	—		—		11	1
Raków Częstochowa	Total		36	4	4	0	—		—		40	4
Raków Częstochowa II	2023–24	III liga, gr. III	1	0	—		—		—		1	0
GKS Katowice (loan)	2024–25	Ekstraklasa	14	0	—		—		—		14	0
GKS Katowice II (loan)	2024–25	Regional league	1	1	—		—		—		1	1
Jagiellonia Białystok	2025–26	Ekstraklasa	21	1	2	0	12 (Note: Appearances in UEFA Conference League)	0	—		35	1
Jagiellonia Białystok	2026–27	Ekstraklasa	2	0	0	0	2 (Note: Appearances in UEFA Europa League)	0	—		4	0
Jagiellonia Białystok	Total		23	1	2	0	14	0	—		39	1
Jagiellonia Białystok II	2025–26	III liga, gr. I	2	0	—		—		—		2	0
Career total			104	10	6	0	14	0	0	0	124	10

== Honours ==
GKS Katowice II

- Regional league Silesia IV: 2024–25
