= Sergio Lozano (footballer) =

Spanish footballer

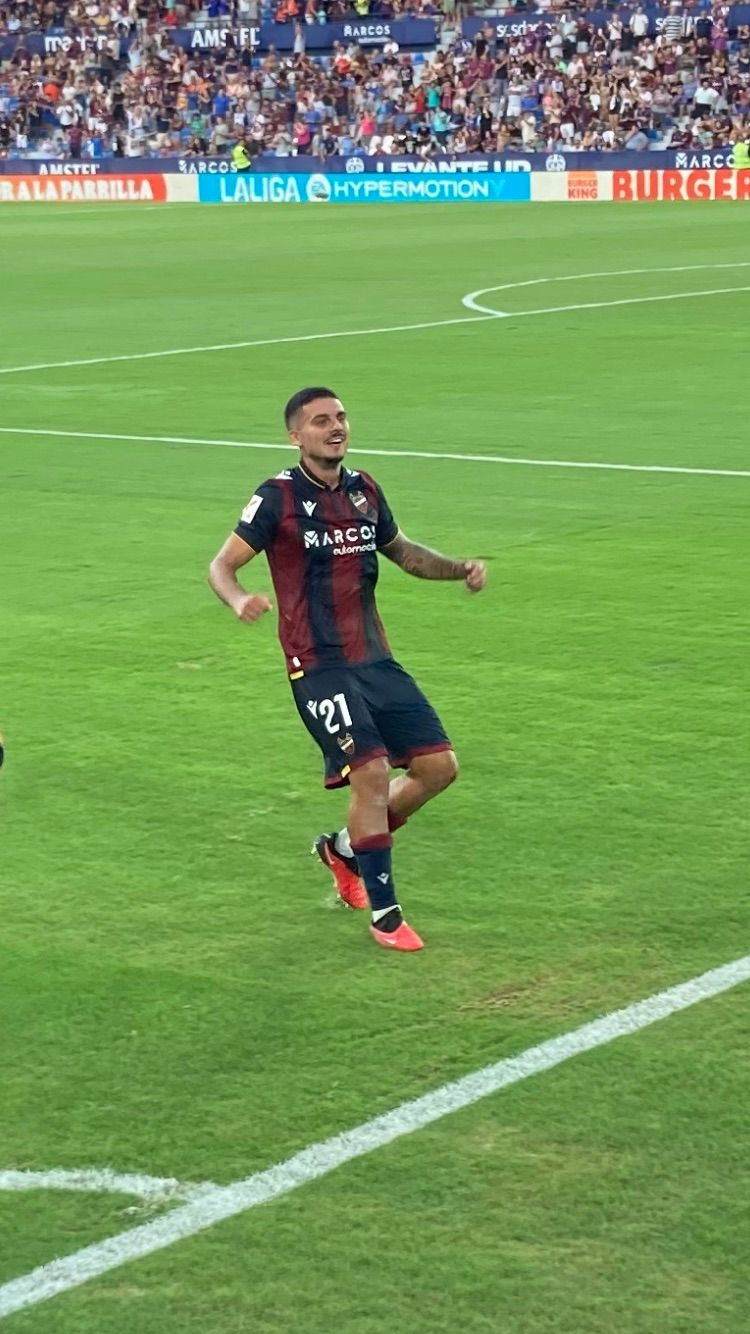
- Lozano playing for Levante in 2023

Personal information
- Full name: Sergio Lozano Lluch
- Date of birth: 24 March 1999 (age 27)
- Place of birth: Benimuslem, Spain
- Height: 1.75 m (5 ft 9 in)
- Position: Midfielder

Team information
- Current team: Jagiellonia Białystok
- Number: 21

Youth career
- Levante
- Villarreal

Senior career*
Years	Team	Apps	(Gls)
2017–2018	Villarreal C	18	(0)
2017–2023	Villarreal B	116	(24)
2017–2021	Villarreal	0	(0)
2020	→ Cartagena (loan)	5	(0)
2023–2025	Levante	77	(1)
2025–	Jagiellonia	22	(4)
2025–	Jagiellonia II	3	(0)

International career
2014	Spain U16	1	(0)
- * Club domestic league appearances and goals as of 18:49, 20 September 2026 (UTC)

Sergio Lozano Lluch (born 24 March 1999) is a Spanish professional footballer who plays as a midfielder for Ekstraklasa club Jagiellonia Białystok.

== Club career ==
Born in Alzira, Valencia, Lozano graduated from the youth setup of local Villarreal CF. On 11 February 2017, he made his debut for the reserves in a 3–2 defeat against Valencia CF B. On 28 August 2017, he made his debut for the C-team in a 0–0 draw against Crevillente Deportivo.

Lozano made his first team debut for the senior team on 7 December 2017, replacing fellow debutant Manu Morlanes in the 76th minute of a 1–0 defeat against Maccabi Tel Aviv in the UEFA Europa League. He scored his first senior goal on 1 September 2019, netting the equalizer for the B's in a 2–1 away win against Hércules CF.

On 13 August 2020, Lozano was loaned to Segunda División newcomers FC Cartagena for the season. On 26 December, after featuring rarely, he was recalled by his parent club.

Lozano helped the B-side to achieve promotion to the second level in 2022, scoring a career-best nine goals in 34 appearances. He scored his first professional goal on 19 August 2022, netting his side's first in a 2–2 home draw against SD Eibar, but being sent off later in the match.

On 6 July 2023, Lozano signed a three-year contract with Levante UD, also in the second division.

On 3 September 2025, Lozano joined Polish Ekstraklasa club Jagiellonia Białystok on a two-year contract, with an option for another year.

== International career ==
On 24 September 2014, Lozano was called to the Spain under-16 team. In the following year, he was awarded by the Valencian Football Federation for his performance with the youth side.

== Honours ==
Levante

- Segunda División: 2024–25
