= Cezary Polak =

Polish footballer (born 2003)

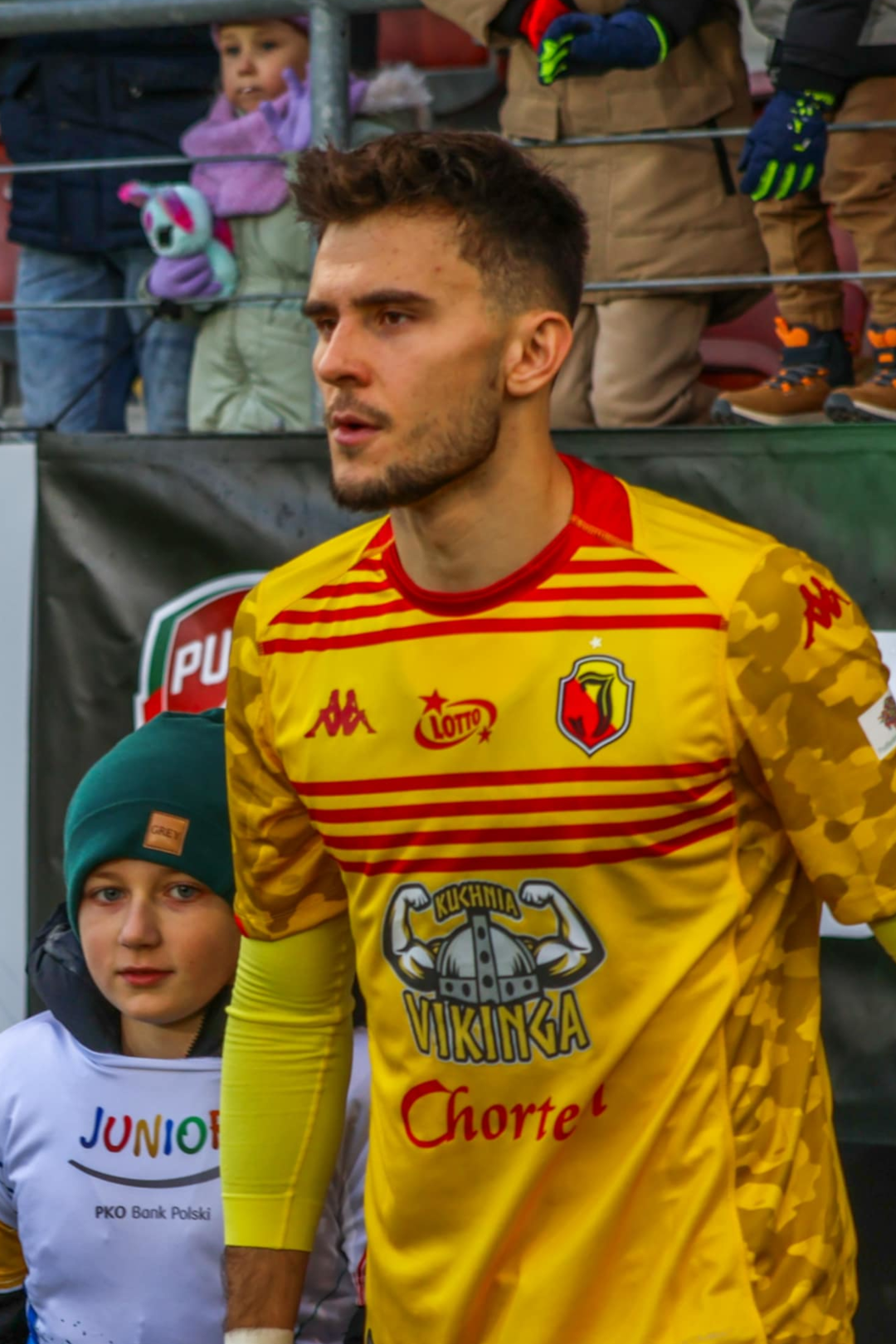
- Polak in 2025 with Jagiellonia Białystok

Personal information
- Date of birth: 31 May 2003 (age 23)
- Place of birth: Otwock, Poland
- Height: 1.84 m (6 ft 0 in)
- Position: Left-back

Team information
- Current team: Jagiellonia Białystok
- Number: 2

Youth career
- 2014–2016: Sęp Żelechów
- 2016: Wilga Garwolin
- 2016–2020: Escola Varsovia

Senior career*
Years	Team	Apps	(Gls)
2020–2022	Escola Varsovia		
2021–2022	→ Motor Lublin (loan)	19	(0)
2022–2023	Garbarnia Kraków	19	(1)
2023–2024	Kotwica Kołobrzeg	36	(4)
2024–	Jagiellonia Białystok	16	(0)
2024–2025	Jagiellonia Białystok II	6	(0)
2026	→ Miedź Legnica (loan)	15	(1)

International career
2023	Poland U20	5	(1)
2024–2025	Poland U21	7	(0)
- * Club domestic league appearances and goals as of 19:06, 20 September 2026 (UTC)

Cezary Polak (born 31 May 2003) is a Polish professional footballer who plays as a left-back for Ekstraklasa club Jagiellonia Białystok.

== Club career ==
=== Youth career ===
In 2013, Polak joined Sęp Żelechów, where he stayed until 2015. In 2016, he started playing in Wilga Garwolin and in the same year, he was transferred to Escola Varsovia, where he spent the rest of his youth career. During his last season in Escola, he played 27 matches and scored eleven goals for their under-19 team.

=== Loan to Motor Lublin ===
On 9 August 2021, Polak was loaned to Motor Lublin until the end of the season, His new club also secured its rights to buy him after the loan. He debuted in II liga nine days later, on 18 August 2021, in a 3–0 home victory over Hutnik Kraków, after being assigned a squad number #76. During that match, he came off the bench in the 85th minute, replacing Piotr Kusiński. He saw the first red card of his senior career on 9 October 2021, in a goalless draw with KKS 1925 Kalisz. In the 2021–22 season, he appeared on the pitch 20 times and made four assists.

=== Garbarnia Kraków ===
On 22 July 2022, he moved to Garbarnia Kraków on a two-year deal, with a clause in his contract allowing it to be prolonged for an additional year. After being assigned squad number #3, he debuted for his new team on 10 August 2022 in a 3–1 home victory against Śląsk Wrocław II. In the 90th minute of that match, he was given a red card. He scored the first goal of his senior career in the 81th minute of a 4–4 home draw with GKS Jastrzębie on 15 October 2022. On 5 April of the following year, in the 73th minute of a 3–0 home victory over Lech Poznań II, he was again sent off the pitch. During his stay at Garbarnia, he made 19 appearances, scored one goal and was given two red cards.

=== Kotwica Kołobrzeg ===
On 13 July 2023, Polak's transfer to Kotwica Kołobrzeg was announced by Garbarnia. In his new club, he was assigned squad number #4. He debuted in Kotwica in a 1–0 home loss against Polonia Bytom, it was also his debut in a starting lineup. He scored his first goal for a new team in the 34th minute of a 3–3 away draw in Polish Cup with Pogoń Siedlce, he was also given a red card at the end of that match.

During the winter break, he rejected a €150,000 transfer offer made by an undisclosed Danish club. Three Ekstraklasa clubs, Legia Warsaw, Raków Częstochowa and Radomiak Radom also made their offers. On 10 March 2024, he scored an own goal in a home loss against Skra Częstochowa, setting its result to 0–1. Together with Kotwica, he advanced to I liga. Throughout the summer break, more offers to transfer him were made. Raków Częstochowa offered €300,000 for his transfer, as well as Aalborg Boldspilklub and 1. FC Magdeburg. Wisła Kraków was also interested in acquiring him for the same amount of money, but they were unsuccessful due to their inability to pay Kotwica directly.

=== Jagiellonia Białystok ===
On 3 September 2024, after successfully undergoing medical testing a day prior, Polak was transferred to Ekstraklasa club Jagiellonia Białystok on a three-year deal. In Jagiellonia, he was assigned squad number 5.

==== Loan to Miedź Legnica ====
On 24 January 2026, Polak was sent on loan to second division club Miedź Legnica until the end of the season. He appeared in 15 league games and recorded one assist, before returning to Jagiellonia at the end of the season.

== International career ==
Polak played for the Poland under-20s, which he captained. He also earned caps with the Poland U21 team, making his debut in a 2–1 victory over Israel on 17 November 2023.

== Career statistics ==
As of match played 6 September 2026

Appearances and goals by club, season and competition
Club	Season	League			Polish Cup		Europe		Other		Total	
Club	Season	Division	Apps	Goals	Apps	Goals	Apps	Goals	Apps	Goals	Apps	Goals
Motor Lublin (loan)	2021–22	II liga	18	0	1	0	—		1 (Note: Appearance in II liga promotion play-offs)	0	20	0
Garbarnia Kraków	2022–23	II liga	19	1	0	0	—		—		19	1
Kotwica Kołobrzeg	2023–24	II liga	29	4	2	0	—		—		31	4
Kotwica Kołobrzeg	2024–25	I liga	7	0	1	0	—		—		8	0
Kotwica Kołobrzeg	Total		36	4	3	0	—		—		39	4
Jagiellonia Białystok	2024–25	Ekstraklasa	11	0	3	0	2 (Note: Appearance(s) in UEFA Conference League)	0	0	0	16	0
Jagiellonia Białystok	2025–26	Ekstraklasa	3	0	2	0	1	0	—		6	0
Jagiellonia Białystok	2026–27	Ekstraklasa	2	0	0	0	0	0	—		2	0
Jagiellonia Białystok	Total		16	0	5	0	3	0	0	0	24	0
Jagiellonia Białystok II	2024–25	III liga, gr. I	3	0	—		—		—		3	0
Jagiellonia Białystok II	2025–26	III liga, gr. I	3	0	—		—		—		3	0
Jagiellonia Białystok II	Total		6	0	—		—		—		6	0
Miedź Legnica (loan)	2025–26	I liga	15	1	—		—		—		15	1
Career total			110	6	9	0	3	0	1	0	123	6
