= Alan Rybak =

Polish association football player (born 2006)

Personal information
- Date of birth: 1 December 2006 (age 19)
- Place of birth: Warsaw, Poland
- Height: 1.85 m (6 ft 1 in)
- Position: Striker

Team information
- Current team: Chrobry Głogów (on loan from Jagiellonia Białystok)
- Number: 51

Youth career
- 2014–2017: Dziewiątka Siedlce
- 2017–2021: Pogoń Siedlce
- 2021–2022: AP Jagiellonia Białystok

Senior career*
Years	Team	Apps	(Gls)
2023–	Jagiellonia Białystok II	28	(8)
2023–	Jagiellonia Białystok	11	(0)
2025–2026	→ Pogoń Siedlce (loan)	10	(0)
2026–	→ Chrobry Głogów (loan)	9	(0)

International career^{‡}
2023	Poland U18	1	(1)
2024–2025	Poland U19	9	(2)
- * Club domestic league appearances and goals as of 18:40, 20 September 2026 (UTC) ‡ National team caps and goals as of 16:54, 25 March 2025 (UTC)

Alan Rybak (born 1 December 2006) is a Polish professional footballer who plays as a striker for I liga club Chrobry Głogów, on loan from Jagiellonia Białystok.

== Career ==
=== Youth career ===
During his youth career, Rybak played for Dziewiątka Siedlce and Pogoń Siedlce youth teams. In 2011, he moved to AP Jagiellonia Białystok.

=== Jagiellonia Białystok ===
Rybak made his debut for Jagiellonia's reserve team on 5 August 2023 in a 1–1 draw with Broń Radom. He scored his first goal for Jagiellonia II two weeks later, in the 52nd minute of a 3–0 victory over Mławianka Mława. He made his first Ekstraklasa appearance on 27 August during a 4–1 victory over Górnik Zabrze. On 18 May 2024, in the 68th minute of a 1–0 away draw over the III liga side GKS Bełchatów, he received a red card as a consequence of seeing two yellow cards. During the 2023–24 season, Rybak played four matches in Jagiellonia's first team and won his first, and Jagiellonia's, league title.

==== Loan to Pogoń Siedlce ====
On 15 July 2025, Rybak joined I liga club Pogoń Siedlce on a season-long loan.

==== Loan to Chrobry Głogów ====
On 10 July 2026, Rybak was sent on loan for the rest of the season to another second division club Chrobry Głogów.

== International career ==
Rybak is a part of Poland's national under-19 team, where he made his debut on 9 October 2024 in a 0–6 away victory over Malta, during which he scored a goal.

== Career statistics ==
As of match played 19 September 2026

Appearances and goals by club, season and competition
Club	Season	League			Polish Cup		Europe		Other		Total	
Club	Season	Division	Apps	Goals	Apps	Goals	Apps	Goals	Apps	Goals	Apps	Goals
Jagiellonia Białystok II	2023–24	III liga, gr. I	9	2	0	0	—		—		9	2
Jagiellonia Białystok II	2024–25	III liga, gr. I	19	6	—		—		—		19	6
Jagiellonia Białystok II	Total		28	8	0	0	—		—		28	8
Jagiellonia Białystok	2023–24	Ekstraklasa	3	0	1	0	—		—		4	0
Jagiellonia Białystok	2024–25	Ekstraklasa	8	0	1	0	0	0	0	0	9	0
Jagiellonia Białystok	Total		11	0	2	0	0	0	0	0	13	0
Pogoń Siedlce (loan)	2025–26	I liga	10	0	1	0	—		—		11	0
Chrobry Głogów (loan)	2026–27	I liga	9	0	1	1	—		—		10	1
Career total			58	8	4	1	0	0	0	0	62	9

== Honours ==
Jagiellonia Białystok

- Ekstraklasa: 2023–24

Jagiellonia Białystok II

- Polish Cup (Podlasie regionals): 2022–23
