= CD Brunete =

Spanish football team

Brunete
- Full name: Centro Deportivo Brunete
- Founded: 1950
- Dissolved: 2011
- Ground: Los Arcos; Brunete, Community of Madrid, Spain
- Capacity: 3,000
- 2010–11: Preferente de Madrid – Group 1, 15th of 18
Home colours	Away colours

Centro Deportivo Brunete were a football team based in Brunete in the Community of Madrid.

== History ==
Centro Deportivo Brunete was founded in 1950. The team came to play three seasons at level 5 of Spanish football (Preferente). At end of the 2010–11 season, the club was dissolved due to financial limitations.

== Uniform ==
- Home Kit: Green Shirt, White pants.

== Stadium ==
Centro Deportivo Brunete, home stadium is Estadio Los Arcos, which has a capacity of 3,000 spectators.

== Season to season ==
Season	Tier	Division	Place	Copa del Rey
1992–93	8	3ª Reg.	3rd	
1993–94	7	2ª Reg.	4th	
1994–95	7	2ª Reg.	1st	
1995–96	6	1ª Reg.	6th	
1996–97	6	1ª Reg.	9th	
1997–98	6	1ª Reg.	16th	
1998–99	7	2ª Reg.	3rd	
1999–2000	7	2ª Reg.	2nd	
2000–01	6	1ª Reg.	14th	
2001–02	6	1ª Reg.	12th	

Season	Tier	Division	Place	Copa del Rey
2002–03	6	1ª Reg.	17th	
2003–04	7	2ª Reg.	1st	
2004–05	6	1ª Reg.	11th	
2005–06	6	1ª Reg.	7th	
2006–07	6	1ª Reg.	6th	
2007–08	6	1ª Reg.	1st	
2008–09	5	Reg. Pref.	8th	
2009–10	5	Pref.	14th	
2010–11	5	Pref.	15th	
