= Paweł Olszewski (footballer) =

Polish footballer

Personal information
- Full name: Paweł Olszewski
- Date of birth: 7 June 1999 (age 27)
- Place of birth: Wrocław, Poland
- Height: 1.78 m (5 ft 10 in)
- Position: Right-back

Team information
- Current team: Polonia Warsaw
- Number: 22

Youth career
- –2016: FC Wrocław Academy Wrocław

Senior career*
Years	Team	Apps	(Gls)
2016–2024	Jagiellonia Białystok II	32	(1)
2016–2025	Jagiellonia Białystok	49	(0)
2017–2019	→ Wigry Suwałki (loan)	27	(0)
2019	→ Stal Mielec (loan)	9	(0)
2024–2025	→ Polonia Warsaw (loan)	19	(0)
2025–	Polonia Warsaw	5	(0)

International career
2014–2015	Poland U16	9	(0)
2015–2016	Poland U17	5	(0)
2016–2017	Poland U18	5	(0)
2016–2017	Poland U19	5	(0)
2018	Poland U20	3	(0)
- * Club domestic league appearances and goals as of 15:23, 29 May 2026 (UTC)

Paweł Olszewski (born 7 June 1999) is a Polish professional footballer who plays as a right-back for I liga club Polonia Warsaw.

== Career ==
Olszewski has been a part of Polish youth international sides, from playing for the under-16 team in 2014 to U20 in 2018.

In July 2017, Olszewski joined Wigry Suwałki on a two-year loan. In July 2019, he was loaned out again, this time to Stal Mielec for the 2019–20 season.

On 3 September 2024, Olszewski moved to I liga club Polonia Warsaw on a season-long loan. In June 2025, he joined Polonia on a permanent basis, signing a two-year contract.

== Honours ==
Jagiellonia Białystok

- Ekstraklasa: 2023–24

Polonia Warsaw II

- V liga Masovia I: 2025–26
