= Benjamín Rojas (footballer) =

Chilean footballer

Personal information
- Full name: Benjamín Ignacio Rojas Ferrera
- Date of birth: 1 March 2001 (age 25)
- Place of birth: Providencia, Santiago, Chile
- Height: 1.79 m (5 ft 10 in)
- Positions: Right-back; centre-back

Team information
- Current team: O'Higgins

Youth career
- Palestino

Senior career*
Years	Team	Apps	(Gls)
2020–2024	Palestino	64	(0)
2021	→ Barnechea (loan)	16	(1)
2025	Pogoń Szczecin	0	(0)
2025	Pogoń Szczecin II	4	(0)
2025–2026	Académico Viseu	4	(0)
2026–	O'Higgins	0	(0)

International career
2020	Chile U20	3	(0)
- * Club domestic league appearances and goals as of 00:13, 8 January 2026 (UTC)

Benjamín Ignacio Rojas Ferrera (born 1 March 2001) is a Chilean professional footballer who plays as a right-back or centre-back for O'Higgins.

== Club career ==
Born in Providencia, Santiago de Chile, Rojas is a product of Palestino and made his professional debut in the 1–4 loss against Universidad Católica for the Chilean Primera División on 8 November 2020. In 2021, he was loaned out to Barnechea. Having taken part in the Copa Libertadores and the Copa Sudamericana with Palestino, he ended his contract with them in December 2024.

In February 2025, Rojas moved abroad and signed with Ekstraklasa club Pogoń Szczecin on a deal until the end of the 2024–25 season with an option to extend his contract for a year. He became the second Chilean player to join Pogoń after Sebastián Rodríguez, who made three appearances in the 2002–03 season. He made four appearances for Pogoń's reserve team before being released at the end of the season.

Following Pogoń Szczecin, Rojas moved to Portugal and signed with Liga Portugal 2 side Académico de Viseu on a deal for a season. However, six months later, after making 6 appearances for the club, his contract was terminated by mutual agreement.

Back to Chile, Rojas joined O'Higgins on 12 January 2026.

== International career ==
Rojas earned three caps for Chile U20. He made appearances against Peru, Bolivia and Brazil in the 2020 Granja Comary International Tournament.

In July 2022, Rojas took part in a training microcycle with Chile U23 under Eduardo Berizzo.
