= Alejandro Cantero =

Spanish footballer (born 2000)

Álex Cantero
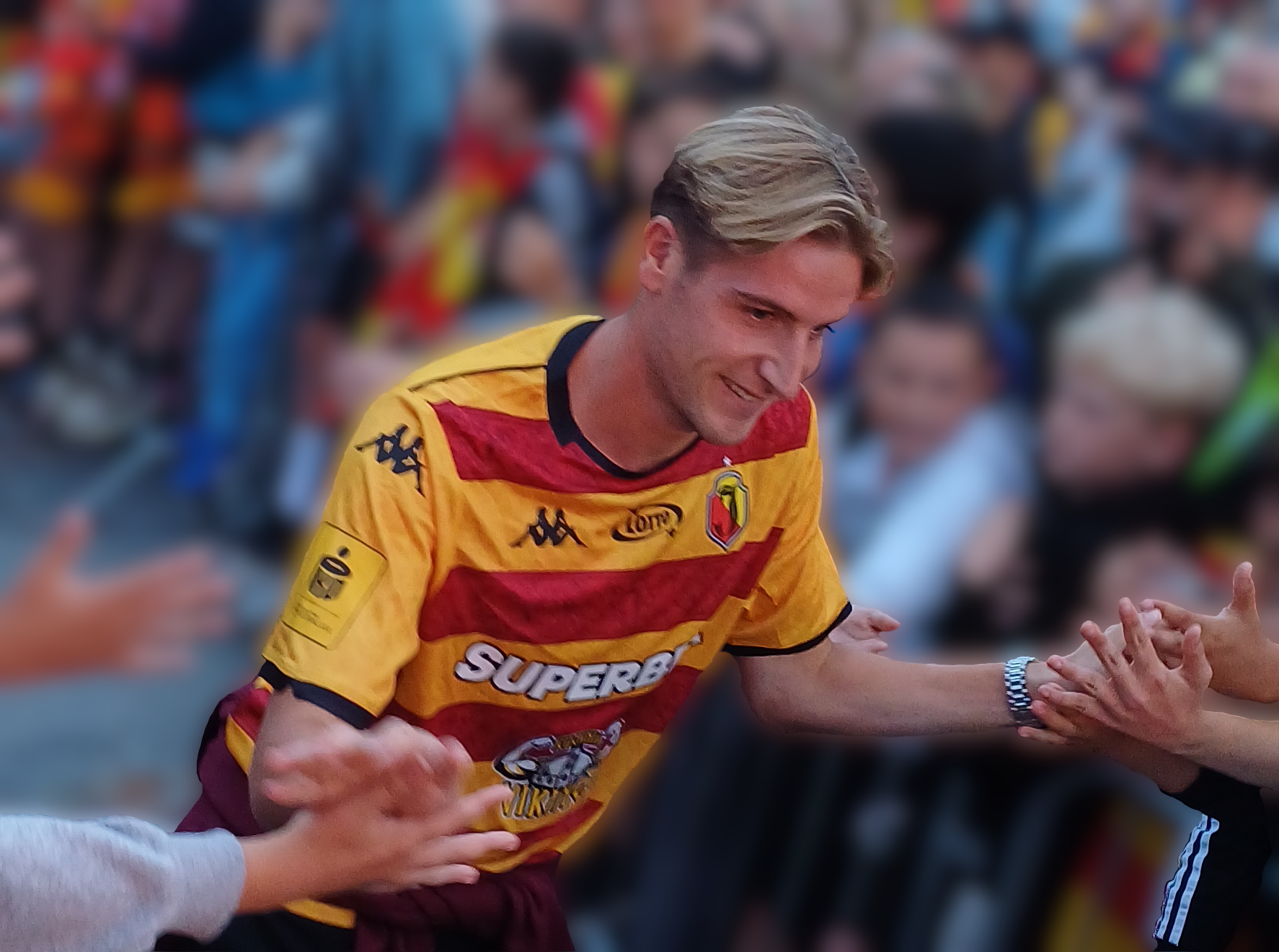
- Cantero with Jagiellonia Białystok in 2025

Personal information
- Full name: Alejandro Cantero Sánchez
- Date of birth: 8 June 2000 (age 26)
- Place of birth: Madrid, Spain
- Height: 1.82 m (6 ft 0 in)
- Position: Winger

Youth career
- 2006–2011: Brunete
- 2011–2016: Real Madrid
- 2016–2018: Levante

Senior career*
Years	Team	Apps	(Gls)
2018–2021	Levante B	50	(7)
2021–2024	Levante	88	(4)
2024–2025	Tenerife	27	(2)
2025–2026	Jagiellonia Białystok	7	(0)
2025–2026	Jagiellonia Białystok II	1	(0)
2026	Huesca	14	(0)

International career
2019	Spain U19	2	(1)
- * Club domestic league appearances and goals as of 9 June 2026

Alejandro "Álex" Cantero Sánchez (born 8 June 2000) is a Spanish professional footballer who plays as a winger.

== Club career ==
=== Levante ===
A youth product of Brunete and Real Madrid, Cantero joined the youth academy of Levante in 2016. He signed a professional contract with Levante on 19 February 2019, for four years.

Cantero began his senior career as a stalwart with Levante's reserve side in Segunda División B. He made his senior debut with Levante in a 2–0 La Liga loss to Celta on 30 April 2021.

On 24 June 2021, Cantero was promoted to the main squad for the 2021–22 campaign. He was mainly a substitute during the season, as the club suffered relegation.

Cantero scored his first professional goal on 27 August 2022, netting the opener in a 2–0 Segunda División home win over Tenerife. On 1 September, his contract was extended until 2025.

=== Tenerife ===
On 21 July 2024, Cantero signed a two-year deal with Tenerife in the second division.

=== Jagiellonia Białystok ===
On 9 July 2025, Cantero moved to Polish club Jagiellonia Białystok on a free transfer, signing a two-year deal with an option for another year.

=== Huesca ===
On 23 January 2026, Cantero returned to his home country and signed an 18-month contract with Huesca in the second division.

== International career ==
Cantero represented the Spain under-19 national team in 2019 for a pair of friendlies.
