= Kajetan Szmyt =

Polish footballer (born 2002)

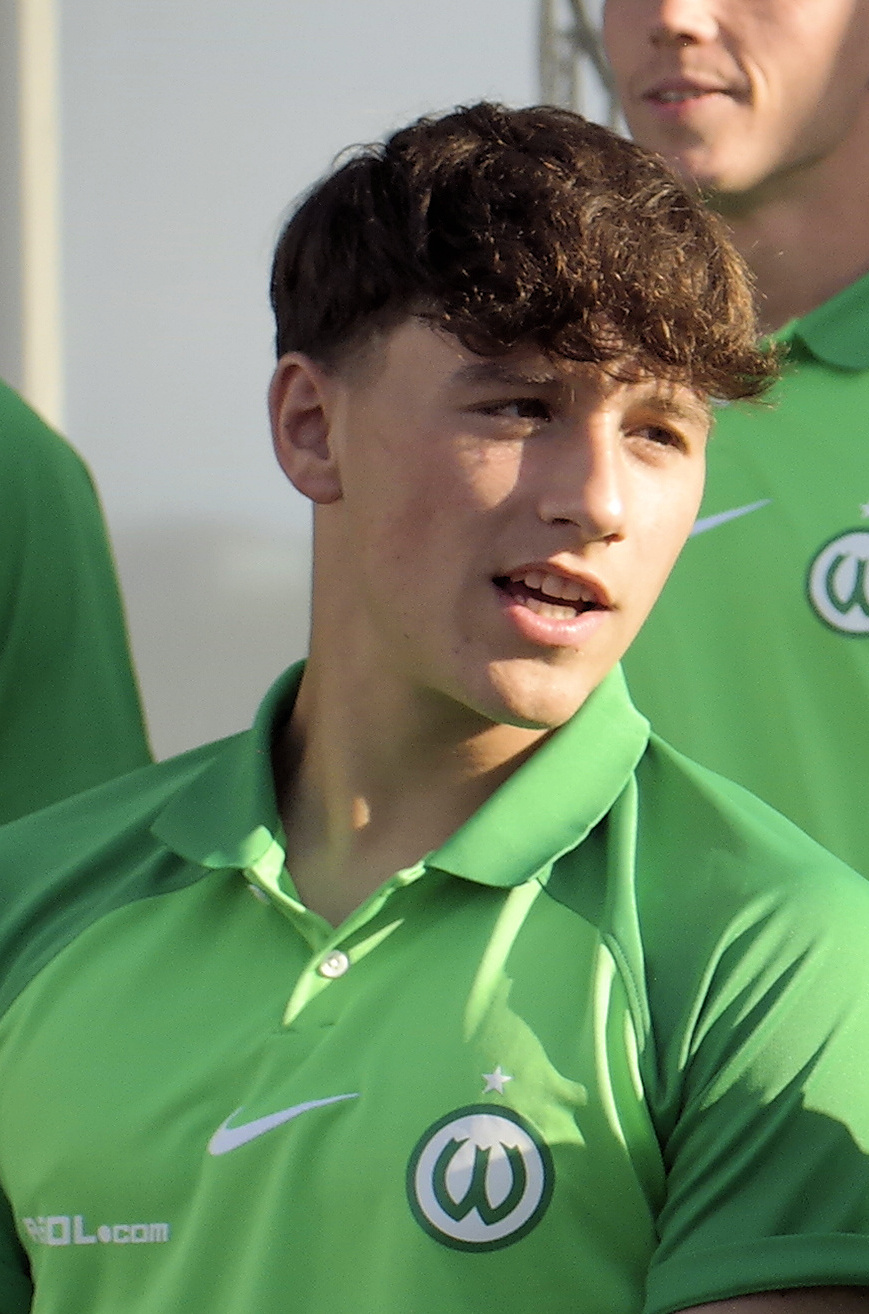
- Szmyt with Warta Poznań in 2023

Personal information
- Full name: Kajetan Szmyt
- Date of birth: 29 May 2002 (age 24)
- Place of birth: Poznań, Poland
- Height: 1.75 m (5 ft 9 in)
- Position: Winger

Team information
- Current team: Jagiellonia Białystok
- Number: 7

Youth career
- 2012–2019: Warta Poznań

Senior career*
Years	Team	Apps	(Gls)
2019–2024	Warta Poznań	79	(10)
2020	→ Górnik Polkowice (loan)	7	(0)
2021	→ Nielba Wągrowiec (loan)	13	(0)
2021–2022	→ Górnik Polkowice (loan)	17	(2)
2024–2026	Zagłębie Lubin	38	(3)
2024	Zagłębie Lubin II	1	(0)
2026–	Jagiellonia Białystok	22	(3)

International career
2022–2025	Poland U21	21	(3)
- * Club domestic league appearances and goals as of 19:02, 20 September 2026 (UTC)

Kajetan Szmyt (born 29 May 2002) is a Polish professional footballer who plays as a winger for Ekstraklasa club Jagiellonia Białystok.

== Career statistics ==
As of match played 20 September 2026

Appearances and goals by club, season and competition
Club	Season	League			Polish Cup		Europe		Other		Total	
Club	Season	Division	Apps	Goals	Apps	Goals	Apps	Goals	Apps	Goals	Apps	Goals
Warta Poznań	2018–19	I liga	2	0	0	0	—		—		2	0
Warta Poznań	2019–20	I liga	1	0	0	0	—		—		1	0
Warta Poznań	2020–21	Ekstraklasa	6	0	2	0	—		—		8	0
Warta Poznań	2021–22	Ekstraklasa	6	0	—		—		—		6	0
Warta Poznań	2022–23	Ekstraklasa	31	3	2	0	—		—		33	3
Warta Poznań	2023–24	Ekstraklasa	33	7	1	0	—		—		34	7
Warta Poznań	Total		79	10	5	0	—		—		84	10
Górnik Polkowice (loan)	2019–20	II liga	7	0	—		—		—		7	0
Nielba Wągrowiec (loan)	2020–21	III liga, gr. II	13	0	—		—		—		13	0
Górnik Polkowice (loan)	2021–22	I liga	17	2	1	0	—		—		18	2
Zagłębie Lubin	2024–25	Ekstraklasa	20	2	0	0	—		—		20	2
Zagłębie Lubin	2025–26	Ekstraklasa	18	1	1	0	—		—		19	1
Zagłębie Lubin	Total		38	3	1	0	—		—		39	3
Zagłębie Lubin II	2024–25	II liga	1	0	0	0	—		—		1	0
Jagiellonia Białystok	2025–26	Ekstraklasa	14	2	—		—		—		14	2
Jagiellonia Białystok	2026–27	Ekstraklasa	8	1	0	0	5 (Note: Appearances in UEFA Europa League)	3	—		13	4
Jagiellonia Białystok	Total		22	3	0	0	5	3	—		27	6
Career total			177	18	7	0	5	3	0	0	189	21

== Honours ==
Individual

- Ekstraklasa Young Player of the Month: August 2023
