= Dimitris Rallis =

Greek footballer (born 2005)

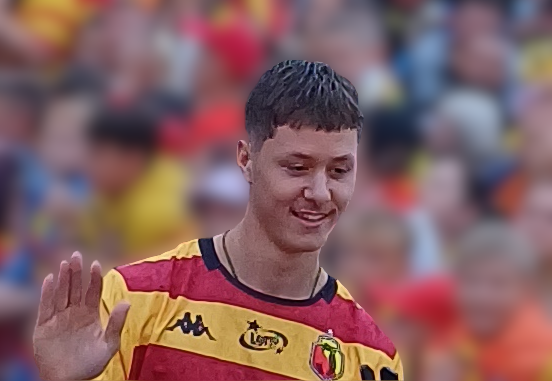
- Rallis with Jagiellonia Białystok in 2025

Personal information
- Full name: Dimitrios Rallis
- Date of birth: 26 March 2005 (age 21)
- Place of birth: Zwolle, Netherlands
- Height: 1.89 m (6 ft 2 in)
- Position: Forward

Team information
- Current team: Jagiellonia Białystok
- Number: 9

Youth career
- CSV '28
- PEC Zwolle
- –2024: Heerenveen

Senior career*
Years	Team	Apps	(Gls)
2024–2025	Heerenveen	23	(2)
2025–	Jagiellonia Białystok	21	(3)
2026–	Jagiellonia Białystok II	4	(2)

International career^{‡}
2024–	Greece U21	10	(3)
- * Club domestic league appearances and goals as of 16:43, 10 November 2026 (UTC) ‡ National team caps and goals as of 20:19, 6 October 2026 (UTC)

Dimitris Rallis (Greek: Δημήτρης Ράλλης, born 26 March 2005) is a professional footballer who plays as a forward for Ekstraklasa club Jagiellonia Białystok. Born in the Netherlands, he represents Greece at youth international level.

== Club career ==
Having spent most of his youth career at Heerenveen, Rallis made his debut for the senior team on 11 August 2024 in an Eredivisie match against Ajax.

== International career ==
On 19 November 2024, Rallis made his debut for Greece U21 as a substitute in a friendly against Hungary, scoring the equalizer from the penalty spot.

== Controversies ==
In August 2025, following Jagiellonia Białystok's UEFA Europa Conference League qualifying match against Dinamo Tirana at the Air Albania Stadium, Rallis posted celebration photos on Instagram with the location tag "Serbia". Albanian media reported on the incident and initially criticized it as a provocation given the sensitive relations between Albania and Serbia. Top Channel also mocked Rallis, joking that as he was only 20 years old and had focused on football from an early age, he might not have studied geography thoroughly.
