= Edi Semedo =

Portuguese footballer

Personal information
- Full name: Edi Mauricio Sanches Semedo
- Date of birth: 6 January 1999 (age 27)
- Place of birth: Funchal, Madeira, Portugal
- Height: 1.81 m (5 ft 11 in)
- Positions: Winger; forward

Youth career
- 2008–2009: Maia
- 2009–2019: Benfica
- 2018–2019: B-SAD

Senior career*
Years	Team	Apps	(Gls)
2020–2021	B-SAD	21	(0)
2021	→ Mafra (loan)	9	(0)
2021–2023	Penafiel	58	(7)
2023–2024	Radomiak Radom	17	(4)
2024–2026	Aris Limassol	40	(2)
2025	→ Jagiellonia Białystok (loan)	7	(0)
- * Club domestic league appearances and goals as of 10:51, 26 June 2026 (UTC)

Edi Mauricio Sanches Semedo (born 6 January 1999) is a Portuguese professional footballer who plays as a winger or forward.

== Career ==
On 7 July 2019, Semedo signed with Belenenses SAD from Benfica. Semedo debuted for Belenenses SAD in a 2–0 Primeira Liga loss to Gil Vicente on 12 January 2020.

On 11 August 2021, he joined Penafiel.

On 7 June 2023, Semedo signed a three-year deal with Polish Ekstraklasa club Radomiak Radom.

On 16 January 2024, he was transferred to Cypriot First Division side Aris Limassol and penned a three-year contract, with a two-year extension option. The transfer fee involved was reported to be around €300,000. On 15 February 2025, Semedo returned to Poland to join top-flight club Jagiellonia Białystok on loan for the rest of the season.

== Personal life ==
Born in Portugal, Semedo is of Cape Verdean descent.

== Career statistics ==
As of match played 25 April 2026

Appearances and goals by club, season and competition
Club	Season	League			National cup (Note: Includes Taça de Portugal, Polish Cup, Cypriot Cup)		League cup (Note: Includes Taça da Liga)		Continental		Other		Total	
Club	Season	Division	Apps	Goals	Apps	Goals	Apps	Goals	Apps	Goals	Apps	Goals	Apps	Goals
B-SAD	2019–20	Primeira Liga	10	0	0	0	0	0	—		—		10	0
B-SAD	2020–21	Primeira Liga	11	0	2	1	0	0	—		—		13	1
B-SAD	Total		21	0	2	1	0	0	—		—		23	1
Mafra (loan)	2020–21	Liga Portugal 2	9	0	—		—		—		—		9	0
Penafiel	2021–22	Liga Portugal 2	26	3	3	0	2	0	—		—		31	3
Penafiel	2022–23	Liga Portugal 2	32	4	2	0	3	1	—		—		37	5
Penafiel	Total		58	7	5	0	5	1	—		—		68	8
Radomiak Radom	2023–24	Ekstraklasa	17	4	1	0	—		—		—		18	4
Aris Limassol	2023–24	Cypriot First Division	15	1	4	0	—		—		—		19	1
Aris Limassol	2024–25	Cypriot First Division	14	0	2	1	—		—		—		16	1
Aris Limassol	2025–26	Cypriot First Division	11	1	0	0	—		1 (Note: Appearance in UEFA Conference League)	1	—		12	2
Aris Limassol	Total		40	2	6	1	—		1	1	—		47	3
Jagiellonia Białystok (loan)	2024–25	Ekstraklasa	7	0	1	0	—		—		0	0	8	0
Career total			152	13	15	2	5	1	1	1	0	0	173	17

== Honours ==
Individual

- Liga Portugal 2 Goal of the Month: September 2022
