= Antoni Klukowski =

Canadian soccer player (born 2007)

Personal information
- Full name: Antoni Klukowski
- Date of birth: April 2, 2007 (age 19)
- Place of birth: Lille, France
- Height: 1.85 m (6 ft 1 in)
- Position: Striker

Team information
- Current team: Widzew Łódź
- Number: 20

Youth career
- –2017: Escola Varsovia
- 2017–2018: Mallorca
- 2019–2020: Atlético Baleares
- 2021: MKS Polonia Warsaw
- 2021–2023: Legia Warsaw

Senior career*
Years	Team	Apps	(Gls)
2023–2025	Pogoń Szczecin II	29	(8)
2024–2025	Pogoń Szczecin	9	(0)
2025–	Widzew Łódź	11	(0)
2025–	Widzew Łódź II	11	(10)
2026	→ Polonia Warsaw (loan)	5	(0)

International career^{‡}
2022–2023	Canada U17	6	(0)
2025	Poland U18	3	(0)
2025	Canada U18	2	(0)
2026–	Canada U20	4	(0)
- * Club domestic league appearances and goals as of October 4, 2026 ‡ National team caps and goals as of June 11, 2026

Antoni Klukowski (born April 2, 2007) is a professional soccer player who plays as a striker for Ekstraklasa club Widzew Łódź. Born in France, he represents Canada at youth level.

== Early life ==
Klukowski was born in Lille, France while his father, the Polish-born Canadian international Michael Klukowski, was playing for Club Brugge in neighbouring Belgium. He subsequently grew up in Warsaw, Poland and Palma de Mallorca, Spain.

== Club career ==
As a youth player, Klukowski joined the youth academy of Spanish side Mallorca. In July 2023, he signed for Polish side Pogoń Szczecin. He made his first team and Ekstraklasa debut on November 8, 2024 as a late substitute in a 0–1 home loss to Radomiak Radom.

On May 26, 2025, Klukowski signed a three-year deal with another Ekstraklasa side Widzew Łódź, effective from July 1.

On February 11, 2026, Klukowski moved on loan to Polish second division club Polonia Warsaw for the remainder of the season.

== International career ==
Klukowski is a Canada youth international. He played for the Canada under-17s at the 2022 Copa Mexico de Naciones. He later played for Canada at the 2023 FIFA U-17 World Cup, appearing in all three matches.

In October 2024, he received a call-up to the Poland under-18s for a friendly tournament in Spain, but was forced to withdraw due to an injury. He made his debut as a substitute in a 1–0 loss to Wales on March 20, 2025.

In August 2025, after being called up to the Poland U19 and the Canada U18 teams, Klukowski opted to represent the latter.

== Style of play ==
Klukowski mainly operates as a striker. He is known for his speed.

== Career statistics ==
As of match played September 18, 2026

Appearances and goals by club, season and competition
Club	Season	League			Polish Cup		Europe		Other		Total	
Club	Season	Division	Apps	Goals	Apps	Goals	Apps	Goals	Apps	Goals	Apps	Goals
Pogoń Szczecin II	2023–24	III liga, gr. II	15	4	0	0	—		—		15	4
Pogoń Szczecin II	2024–25	III liga, gr. II	14	4	—		—		—		14	4
Pogoń Szczecin II	Total		29	8	0	0	—		—		29	8
Pogoń Szczecin	2024–25	Ekstraklasa	9	0	1	0	—		—		10	0
Widzew Łódź	2025–26	Ekstraklasa	7	0	1	0	—		—		8	0
Widzew Łódź	2026–27	Ekstraklasa	4	0	0	0	—		—		4	0
Widzew Łódź	Total		11	0	1	0	—		—		12	0
Widzew Łódź II	2025–26	III liga, gr. I	10	10	—		—		—		10	10
Widzew Łódź II	2026–27	III liga, gr. I	1	0	0	0	—		—		1	0
Widzew Łódź II	Total		11	10	0	0	—		—		11	10
Polonia Warsaw (loan)	2025–26	I liga	5	0	—		—		0	0	5	0
Career total			65	18	2	0	0	0	0	0	67	18

== Honours ==
Polonia Warsaw II

- V liga Masovia I: 2025–26
