= Jagiellonia Białystok II =

Polish football club

- Ground: Jagiellonia Białystok Training Center
- Manager: Daniel Rusek
- League: III liga, group I
- 2025–26: III liga, group I, 8th of 18
Home colours	Away colours

Jagiellonia Białystok II is a Polish football team, which serves as the reserve side of Jagiellonia Białystok. They compete in group I of the III liga, the fourth division of Polish football, after winning promotion in 2020.

They achieved notable success by winning the Białystok Polish Cup in the 1980–81, 1983–84, 1987–88, 1989–90, and 1990–91 seasons, which qualified them to compete at the central level of the competition in the subsequent seasons. Additionally, the reserves participated in the Polish Cup during the 2004–05, 2005–06 and 2023–24 seasons.

== Honours ==
- III liga Podlasie
  - Champions: 2006–07
  - Runners-up: 2004–05, 2005–06
- IV liga Podlasie
  - Champions: 2019–20
- Polish Cup (Podlasie regionals)
  - Winners: 2022–23
  - Runners-up: 2003–04, 2004–05, 2006–07, 2014–15, 2020–21, 2024–25, 2025–26
- Polish Cup (Białystok regionals)
  - Winners: 1980–81, 1983–84, 1987–88, 1989–90, 1990–91

== Polish Cup records ==
Season	Round	Opponent	Result
2004–05	Preliminary round	Lechia Gdańsk	2–2 (3–4 p)
2005–06	Preliminary round	Warta Sieradz	1–3
2007–08	Preliminary round	Jeziorak Iława	0–3 (withdrawn)
2023–24	First round	Korona Kielce	1–2
