= Jacek Bayer =

Polish footballer (born 1964)

Personal information
- Date of birth: 29 December 1964 (age 61)
- Place of birth: Białystok, Poland
- Height: 1.87 m (6 ft 2 in)
- Position: Forward

Team information
- Current team: Hetman Białystok (manager)

Senior career*
| Years | Team | Apps | (Gls) |
| 1982–1984 | Jagiellonia Białystok | | |
| 1984–1986 | Gwardia Białystok | | |
| 1986–1989 | Jagiellonia Białystok | 54+ | (20+) |
| 1989–1991 | Widzew Łódź | 20+ | (9+) |
| 1991–1992 | Siarka Tarnobrzeg | | |
| 1993–1994 | Jagiellonia Białystok | | |
| 1994–1997 | KP Wasilków | | |
| 1997–1998 | Hetman Białystok | | |
| 1998–1999 | STP Adidas Suwałki | | |
| 1999–2000 | Sparta 1951 Szepietowo | | |
| 2000–2004 | Piast Białystok | | |

International career
| 1987 | Poland | 1 | (0) |

Managerial career
- 2004–2011: Piast Białystok
- 2012–2017: Sparta Augustów
- 2022–: Hetman Białystok
- * Club domestic league appearances and goals

Jacek Bayer (born 29 December 1964) is a Polish football manager and former professional player who played as a forward. He is currently in charge of Hetman Białystok.

== Career ==
Bayer was nicknamed "Duży" (Big) because he played with his little brother Dariusz at Jagiellonia, nicknamed "Mały" (Little).

Initially, he found it hard to adjust after leaving third division Hetman Białystok for Jagiellonia, but regained his confidence by scoring four goals in three friendlies.

While still playing in the second division in 1987, Bayer was called up to the national team for a UEFA Euro 1988 qualifying match against Cyprus. He came close to scoring, hitting the crossbar in the 0–0 draw, and was the last player from the second division to feature internationally for Poland.

== Honours ==
=== Managerial ===
Sparta Augustów

- Regional league Podlasie II: 2015–16
