= Jagiellonia Białystok =

Polish association football club

- Full name: Jagiellonia Białystok Sportowa Spółka Akcyjna
- Nickname: Jaga
- Founded: 30 May 1920; 106 years ago
- Ground: Chorten Arena
- Capacity: 22,432
- Chairman: Vacant
- Manager: Adrian Siemieniec
- League: Ekstraklasa
- 2025–26: Ekstraklasa, 3rd of 18
- Website: www.jagiellonia.pl
Home colours	Away colours	Third colours

Jagiellonia Białystok (Polish pronunciation: [jaɡʲɛ(l)ˈlɔɲa bjaˈwɨstɔk]) is a Polish professional football club based in Białystok that plays in the Ekstraklasa, the top level of Polish football. The club was founded in 1920 by soldiers in the 42nd Infantry Regiment Reserve Battalion in Białystok. Jagiellonia play their home games at the Chorten Arena.

Jagiellonia is the most accomplished football club of north-eastern Poland. The club won the Polish Cup and Super Cup in 2010 and qualified to play in the third qualification round of the UEFA Europa League, their first appearance in European competition. The club's most successful season was the 2023–24 Ekstraklasa when they were crowned champions for the first time in the club's history.

== History ==
=== The establishment of the club ===
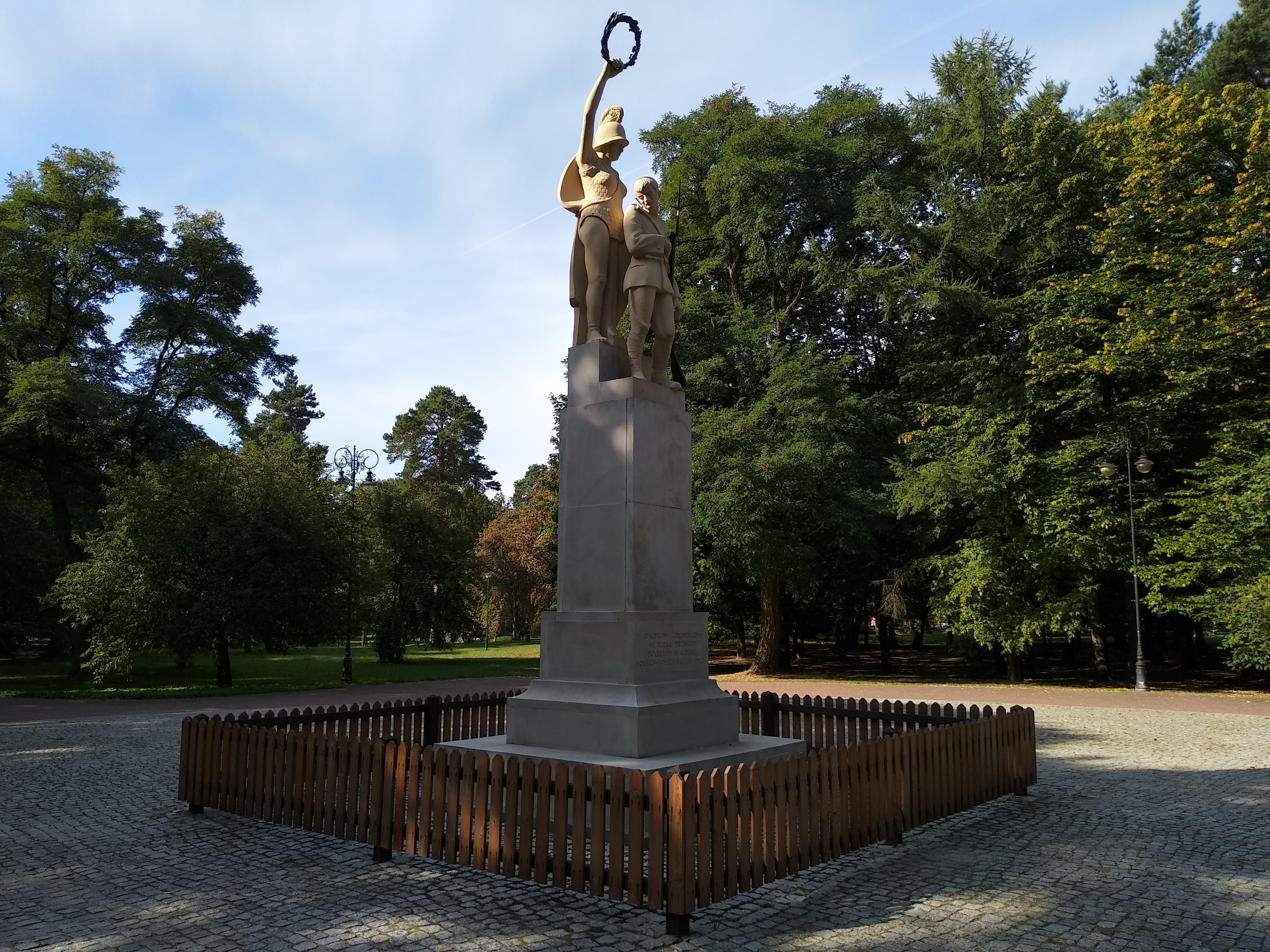
42nd Infantry Regiment Monument in Białystok

Jagiellonia Białystok was founded by soldiers in the Reserve Battalion of the 42nd Infantry Regiment on May 30, 1920. The team's original name was shortened to KSBZ 42 PP. Their first game was played on 30 May 1920 against Kresowcy Białystok which they won 5–1. Later the team name was changed to WKS 42 PP, an abbreviation for Wojskowy Klub Sportowy, which means Army Sport Club. On November 2, 1930 WKS 42PP lost 1–2 against WKS 82 PP for the play-offs to advance to Division 1. January 27, 1932 was the first time Jagiellonia was introduced into the club's name when it was changed to Białystok Sports Club Jagiellonia. The term Jagiellonia refers to the Jagiellonian dynasty which ruled Poland for two centuries. Around the same time, the club's coat of arms was also introduced with its red and yellow colours. In 1938, due to financial problems, the club dissolved and ceased to exist until its reactivation in 1945. Unfortunately, in June the following year, with the new government in place there was no room for Jagiellonia, mostly because of the history with the Bolsheviks in 1920 and the 42nd Infantry Regiment. On January 26, 1957 the merging of Budowlani Białystok and Sparta Białystok reactivated Sports Club Jagiellonia Białystok with the original yellow-red-black crest restored.

=== 1920s ===
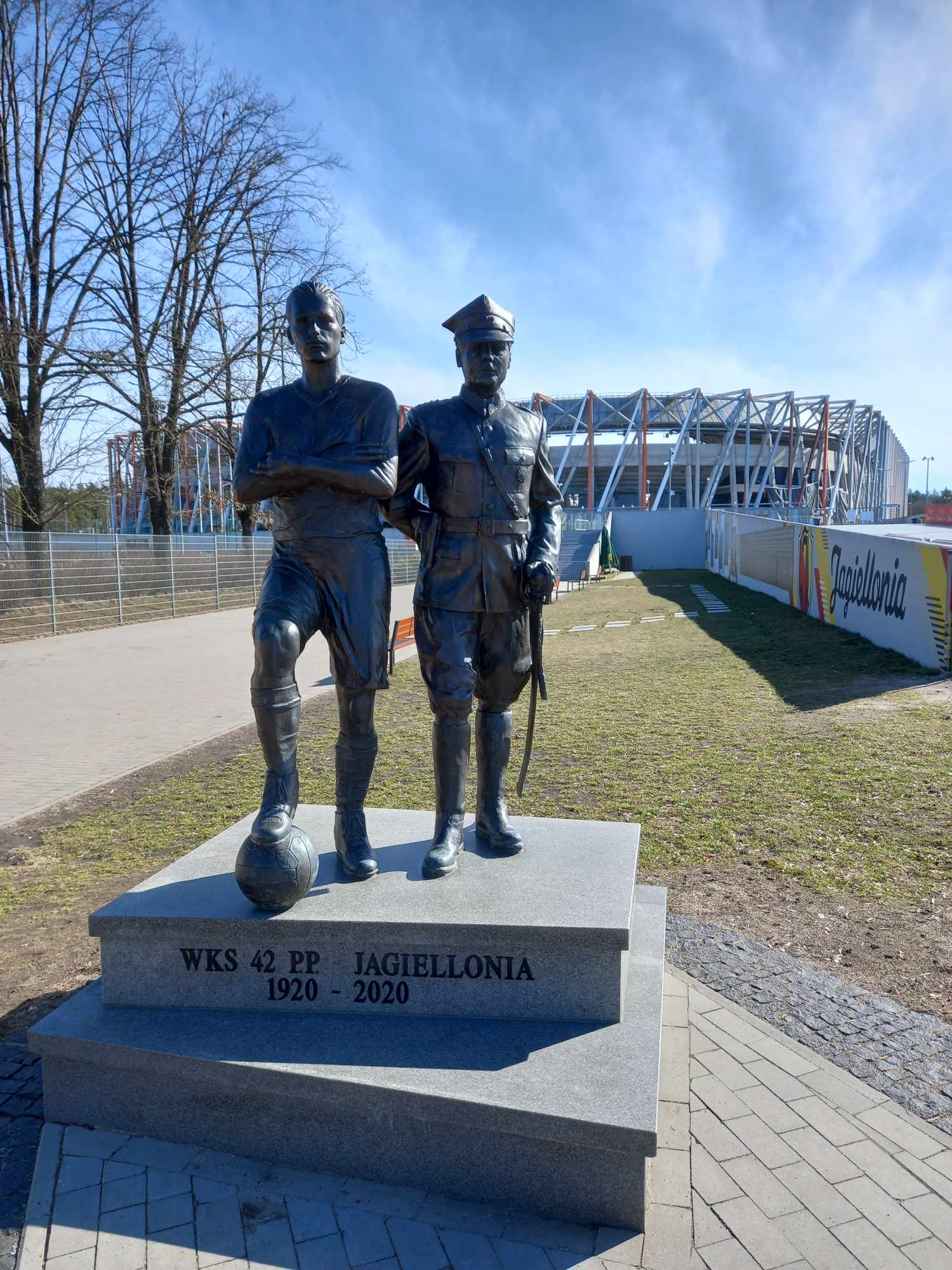
Monument of pre-war players Antoni Komendo-Borowski, best player of Jagiellonia in the interbellum, and Julian Buchcik, also former manager

In mid-1920, many players fought in the Polish–Soviet War. In November 1920, the club resumed activities. In 1920–1923, most of the matches Jagiellonia played were either friendlies or small tournaments in Białystok. The club joined the regular league in 1924, starting in klasa B in the Wilno OZPN district. The season was a success, winning the first season and gaining promotion to klasa A. Due to a pause in the league, there were no games in 1925. In 1926, the league started up again with the team being in klasa A. The team was doing well, finishing third in the following season. Later through the years the match officials were being paid off to make the Białystok team not do well and ultimately get demoted. In 1929, it was decided to change districts where Jagiellonia played to the newly formed Białystok OZPN.

=== 1930s ===
In 1930 42PP, the club's name at the time, was the most successful thus far. They appeared in the play-offs for the top division in the country. At the end of the play-offs Jagiellonia and another team, WKS 82 pp Brześć, were tied for points and had to play one more game at a neutral ground to see who was the winner to that season. Jagiellonia fell to WKS 82 pp Brześć 2–1. Jagiellonia did win the district championship that season but it was the last trophy they won before World War II.

A big moment for the club was on January 27, 1932 when the WKS 42 PP football team and the KS Związku Młodzieży Wiejskiej athletics club merged to create a new multi-sports club called Białostocki Klub Sportowy (Białystok Sports Club) Jagiellonia. It is not known who created the team's new crest but what is known is that it had to do with the history of the Jagiellonian dynasty, which ruled Poland between 1386 and 1572. Several more departments were founded, including volleyball, basketball, boxing. The most successful team sport section was the volleyball team, which qualified to the Polish Championships in 1933 and 1934, finishing 7th and 8th respectively.

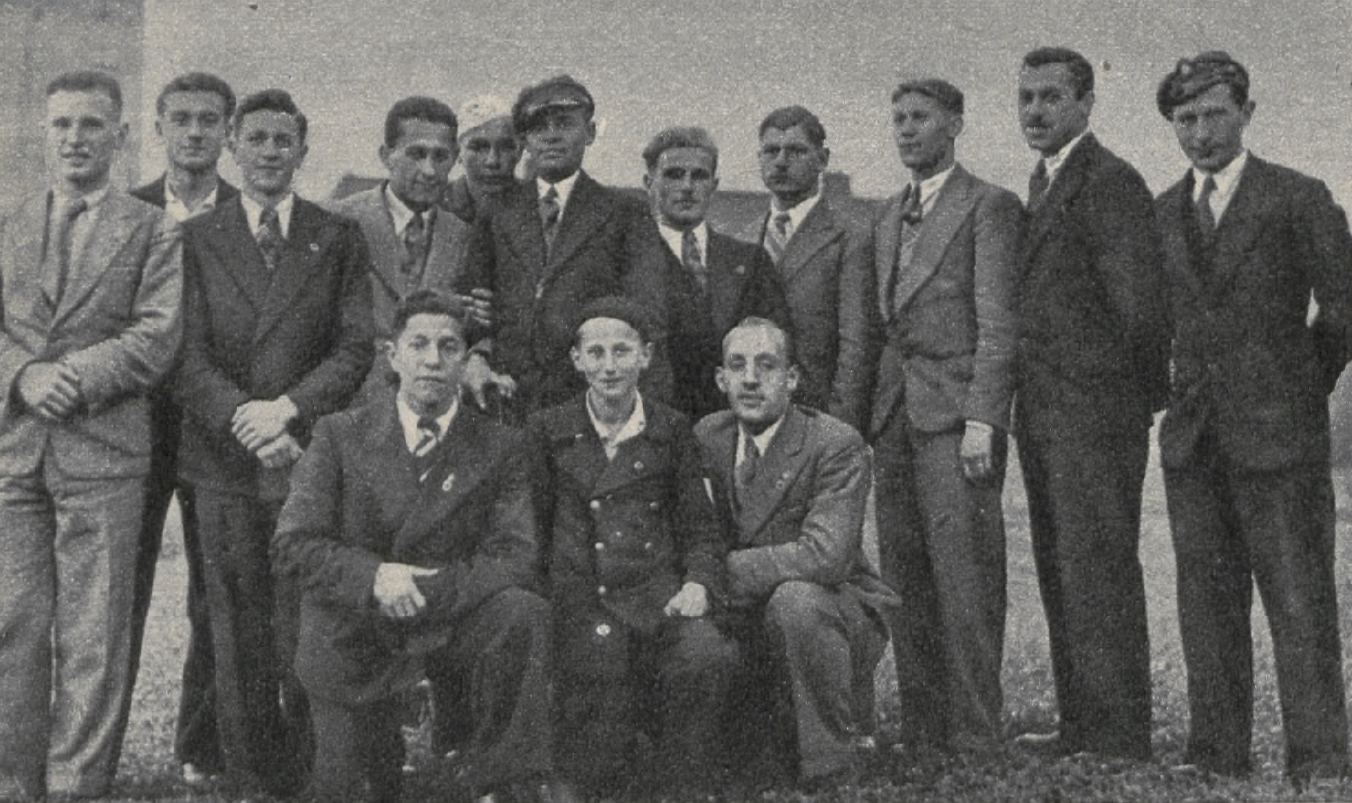
Players of Jagiellonia in 1934

In the mid-thirties Jagiellonia began to experience problems, the city was not able to maintain the club. In 1932, the military stationed in Białystok took an active role in trying to save the club, along with the municipal government in 1936 the club's name changed to Military Sports Club Jagiellonia. Unfortunately, this decision did not solve the problem completely. In 1938, the club joined the A-class 1937/38 season but had to withdraw shortly after due to financial reasons. All the matches were cancelled and all the players were forced to find new clubs. Most of the players joined Strzelec Białystok and played there for two seasons before World War II broke out in 1939 and closed the first chapter in the history of the club.

=== World War II ===
Many players of Jagiellonia fought in defense of Poland during the German-Soviet invasion of Poland, which started World War II in September 1939, and then many joined the Polish resistance movement during the subsequent occupation. Several players were murdered by the Russians in the Katyn massacre in 1940, whereas the fate of vice-chairman Seweryn Nowakowski, who was arrested by the NKVD, remains unknown.

=== After World War II ===
After the second world war Jagiellonia was revived mostly in part by Karol Kowalczyński, but the revival was short-lived as the club dissolved on 20 June 1946. In the place of the disbanded Jagiellonia came Motor Białystok, which became the champion of the Białystok region and advanced to the Polish championship in 1946. Next year Motor Białystok joined the struggle for the Polish championship and the right to get into I league. In 1949 Białystok had a new team called Budowlani Białystok and in 1951 Motor Białystok merged into Budowlani Białystok. In 1955 Budowlani Białystok changed its name to BKS Jagiellonia Białystok. On 26 January 1957, a merger of two clubs, Jagiellonia Białystok and Sparta, resulted in a club called Jagiellonia. For the second time in its history Jagiellonia had the host stadium of Stadium Zwierzyniecki.

=== 1970s ===
In the early 70s the team played in Klasa A and in the district league. The team's situation changed when Michał Urban became coach of the team, players started to go to a modern training camp with modern drills. Many young players started playing for the club, including future representatives for the Polish national team juniors. Grzegorz Bielatowicz joined the club as a scout and found a few young talents from the north-east region, among them was Jerzy Zawiślan who was the 2nd top scorer in the II League 1975–76 season who scored 13 goals. The team started to have some success and were promoted to Division II after winning the promotion play-offs in the 1974–75 season. The team was eventually promoted to League II in 1975, but the success was short-lived after only being there for 3 seasons, Jagiellonia was relegated in 1978. At the end of the 70s Jerzy Bołtuć, Leszek Frelek, Ryszard Karalus and Zbigniew Skoczylas began a large youth project to bring in a strong and young new team.

=== 1980s ===
In the 1982–83 season, the club, led by Grzegorz Bielatowicz, had a successful run finishing first place with a nine-point advantage over second place, Gwardia Szczytno, promoting the team to Division II. With Olympic silver medalist Janusz Wójcik as coach, the team played a number of good seasons in Division II finishing third in 1986 and the following year was promoted to I Liga for the first time in the club's history. In addition, the top scorer in the competition was a later representative of Poland, Jacek Bayer who netted 20 times for Jagiellonia.

Matches in the second league in Białystok were already averaging 15 thousand viewers. The first match in the return to Ekstraklasa had estimated 35-40 thousand supporters. Every home match following the first was viewed by no less than 20 thousand fans in the stands. Stories from witnesses said they recall buses of supporters come from villages all over the region. The first few seasons did not turn out well for the Białystok team as they finished 8th twice and then 16th, which meant they were relegated. A year later the team lost the playoffs for promotion in a penalty shoot-out against Zagłębie Sosnowiec. In the following year Jagiellonia finished 2nd place earning them promotion to the Ekstraklasa. After only one season in the first league the team was significantly outclassed and were relegated, where they continued to fall to the 4th league. They did not spend much time in the bottom tiers; within 3 years Jagiellonia was back in the second league.

=== 2000s and 2010s ===
In 2007, the team advanced to the first tier. The first season back the team finished 14th place with 27 points. The following year was better where the club finished 8th with 34 points. In 2009, the club was punished with a deduction of 10 points following a corruption scandal, committed by the previous president of the club. The first success of the club was the 2009–10 season where Jagiellonia won the Polish Cup, beating Pogoń Szczecin thanks to a goal from Andrius Skerla. The 2014–15 season was the second most successful season Jagiellonia saw finishing 3rd place. In the 2016–17 season Jagiellonia were runners up for the first time in the club's history. Jagiellonia won the Polish Cup and finished 3rd and 2nd when coached by Michał Probierz.

Ireneusz Mamrot became the club's new coach in June 2017. With Mamrots' guidance the club won the silver medal as runners up in a very tight race for the Polish championship, thus earning them a spot in the Europa League for the 2nd time in a row.

In the 2018–19 season, Jagiellonia Białystok drew an average home league attendance of 9,458. In January 2019, Rafał Grzyb, having the most caps for the club and long time captain became the club's new assistant coach, officially retiring from playing football. On 23 August 2019, Jesús Imaz scored the first hat-trick in the club's history in the Ekstraklasa.

=== 2024–: first championship and league phase of UEFA competitions ===
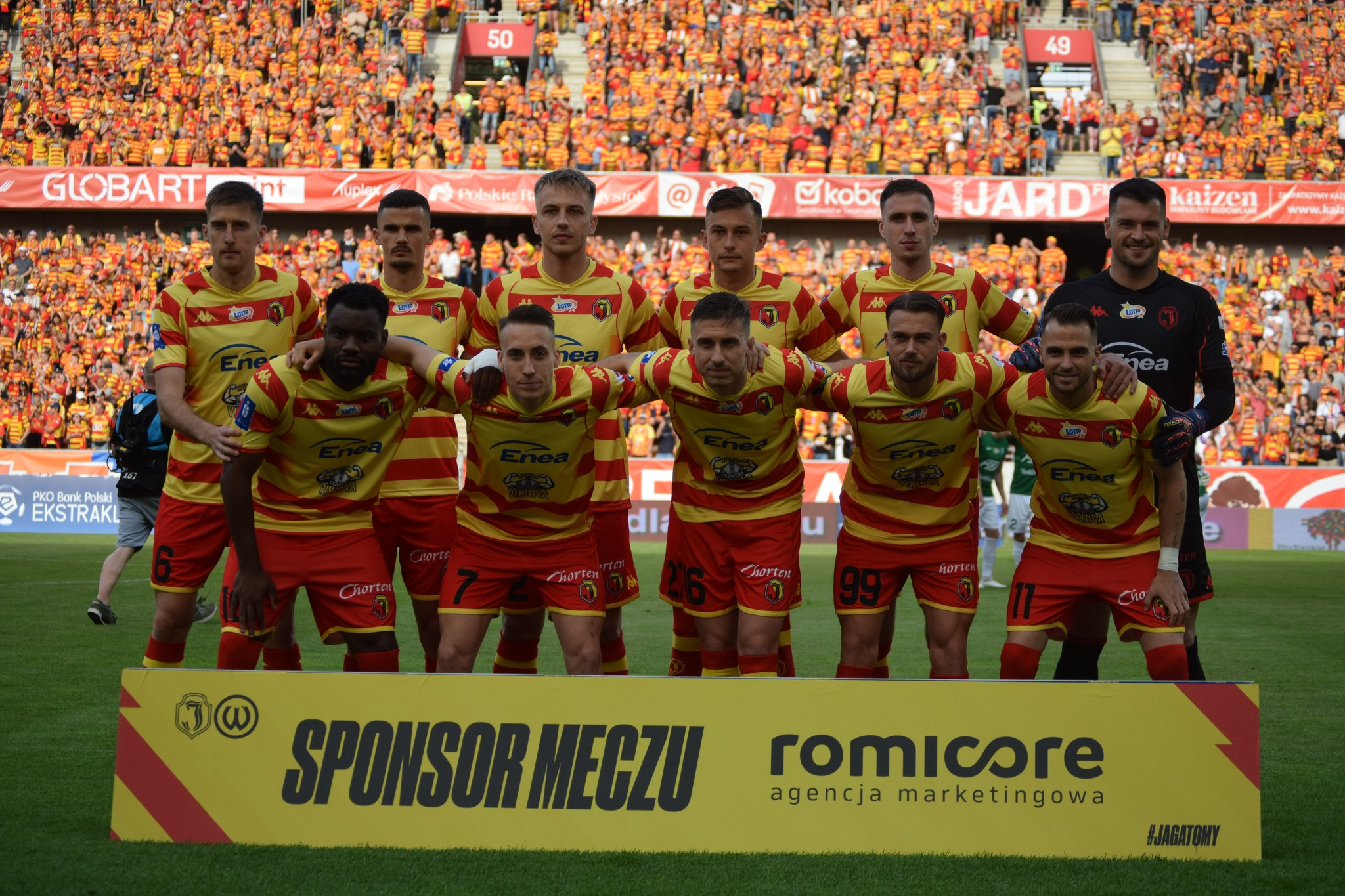
The starting team of Jagiellonia before the match of the last round of the 2023–24 Ekstraklasa against Warta Poznań, decisive for the championship title

On 25 May 2024, Jagiellonia won the Ekstraklasa title for the first time in the club's 104-year history, following a 3–0 win over Warta Poznań on the final day of the season, winning the title on head-to-head goal difference against Śląsk Wrocław.

In the 2024–25 European campaign, Jagiellonia Białystok started in the UEFA Champions League second qualifying round, defeating Panevėžys with an aggregate score of 7–1 (3–1 at home, 4–0 away). In the third qualifying round, they faced Bodø/Glimt and were eliminated with a 1–5 aggregate loss (0–1 at home, 1–4 away). This led Jagiellonia to the UEFA Europa League play-off round, where they played against Ajax but were defeated 1–7 on aggregate (1–4 at home, 0–3 away). Jagiellonia then entered the UEFA Conference League league phase. The team began with an impressive 2–1 away win over Copenhagen, followed by a 2–0 home victory against Petrocub Hîncești and a commanding 3–0 triumph over Molde. A thrilling 3–3 draw away at Celje showcased their attacking flair, while a narrow 1–0 loss to Mladá Boleslav and a goalless draw with Olimpija Ljubljana concluded the group phase. Despite these mixed results, Jagiellonia advanced from the group in convincing fashion.

In the knockout round play-offs, the club faced Serbian side TSC Bačka Topola and progressed with a 6–2 aggregate win, including back-to-back 3–1 victories. In the round of 16, Jagiellonia eliminated Cercle Brugge of Belgium, winning 3–0 at home before falling 2–0 away, holding on for a 3–2 aggregate result. Their European run ended in the quarter-finals against Real Betis. Despite a 2–0 defeat in Seville and a 1–1 draw in Białystok, the Polish side earned widespread praise for their performances throughout the tournament.

Domesticially, Jagiellonia failed to defend their Ekstraklasa title, finishing in 3rd place, and were knocked out of the Polish Cup in the round of 16.

== Club's crest ==
Yellow-red colours of Jagiellonia come from the crest of the city of Białystok

The club's crest and colours first appeared in 1932. The original crest consisted of a black, stylized letter "J" and a yellow and cherry red colour shield, while the flag and the jerseys of the club were white and black. It was not until the mid-80s that fans began to use yellow-red as club colours, but official documents at the time still use the white and black colours. Currently, the team's official colours are yellow-red, but in reference to history the team's away colours are white and black.

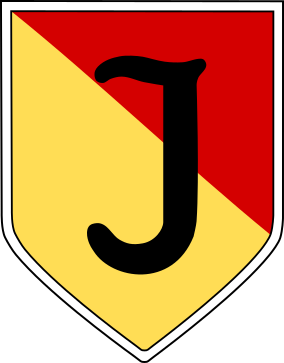
1932–1946

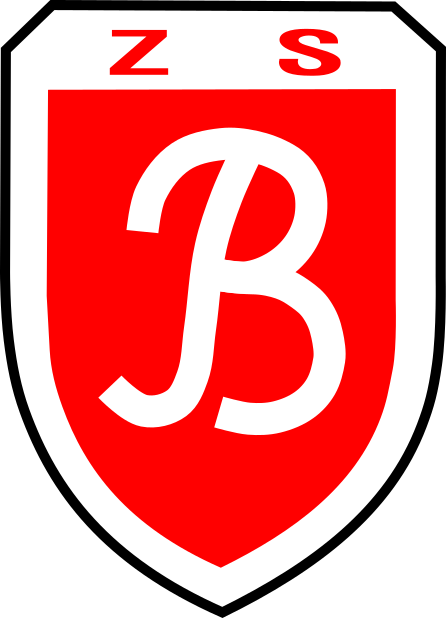
1950–1957

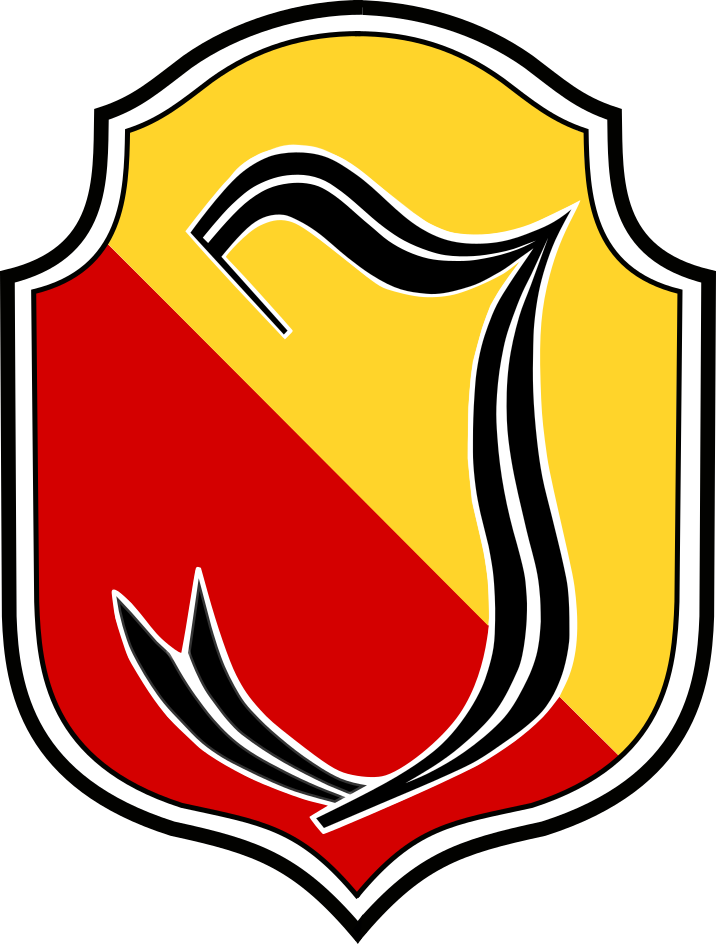
1957–c. 1980

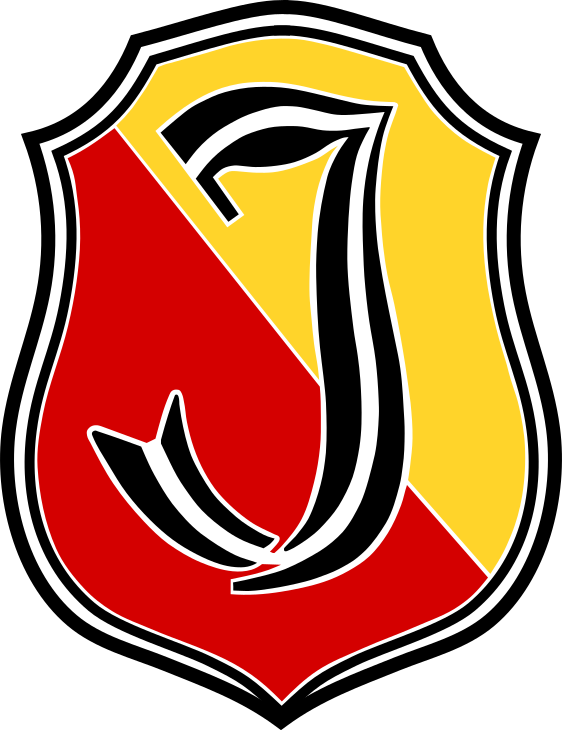
c. 1980–1989

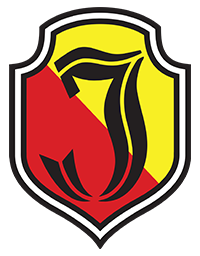
1989–2006

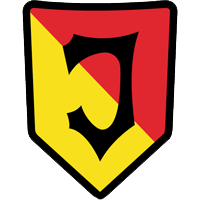
2006–2020

== Team name ==
Chronology of the team name:

- 1920 – WKS 42 Pułk Piechoty Białystok
- 1932 – B.K.S. Jagiellonia Białystok
- 1935 – W.K.S. Jagiellonia Białystok
- 1945 – B.K.S. Jagiellonia Białystok
- 1946 – P.K.S. Motor Białystok
- 1948 – Klub Sportowy Białystok Wicie
- 1949 – Związkowiec Białystok
- 1951 – Budowlani Białystok
- 1955 – Jagiellonia Białystok Budowlani
- 1973 – Jagiellonia Białystok MKSB
- 1999 – Jagiellonia Białystok-Wersal Podlaski
- 2003 – Jagiellonia Białystok SSA

== Players ==
=== Current squad ===
As of 9 September 2026

Note: Flags indicate national team as defined under FIFA eligibility rules; some limited exceptions apply. Players may hold more than one non-FIFA nationality.

No.	Pos.	Nation	Player
1	GK	POL	Michał Perchel
2	DF	POL	Cezary Polak
3	DF	SLO	Dušan Stojinović
4	DF	JPN	Yuki Kobayashi
5	DF	POR	Bernardo Vital
6	MF	POL	Taras Romanczuk (captain)
7	MF	POL	Kajetan Szmyt
8	MF	POL	Dawid Drachal
9	FW	GRE	Dimitris Rallis
10	FW	SWE	Jeremy Agbonifo (on loan from Lens)
11	FW	ESP	Jesús Imaz
14	MF	SWE	Hampus Finndell
15	MF	POL	Norbert Wojtuszek
17	FW	BEL	Youssuf Sylla
19	MF	DEN	Anders Klynge
20	DF	POL	Bartłomiej Wdowik (on loan from Braga)
21	MF	ESP	Sergio Lozano
23	DF	POR	Guilherme Montóia

No.	Pos.	Nation	Player
27	DF	POR	Rodrigo Conceição
30	FW	SEN	Ousmane Sow (on loan from Brøndby)
32	MF	SRB	Aleksandar Ćirković (on loan from Ferencváros)
44	DF	GRE	Apostolos Konstantopoulos
50	GK	POL	Sławomir Abramowicz
59	MF	POL	Paweł Pakieła
61	DF	POL	Bartłomiej Krasiewicz
63	DF	POL	Olaf Pankiewicz
65	FW	BLR	Maksim Kononov
66	GK	POL	Adrian Damasiewicz
67	GK	POL	Jakub Rabiczko
72	MF	POL	Kamil Jóźwiak
80	MF	POL	Zachary Zalewski
85	MF	POL	Eryk Kozłowski
90	MF	POL	Maciej Kuczyński
99	FW	SLO	Nik Prelec
—	MF	POL	Jakub Kucharski

=== Out on loan ===
Note: Flags indicate national team as defined under FIFA eligibility rules; some limited exceptions apply. Players may hold more than one non-FIFA nationality.

No.	Pos.	Nation	Player
25	MF	USA	Aziel Jackson (at Minnesota United until 31 December 2026)
31	MF	USA	Leon Flach (at VfL Osnabrück until 30 June 2027)

No.	Pos.	Nation	Player
51	FW	POL	Alan Rybak (at Chrobry Głogów until 30 June 2027)
71	MF	POL	Szymon Stypułkowski (at Chojniczanka Chojnice until 30 June 2027)

=== Notable players ===
Albania

- (Albania) Bekim Balaj

Armenia

- (Armenia) Robert Arzumanyan

Bosnia and Herzegovina

- (Bosnia and Herzegovina) Ensar Arifović
- (Bosnia and Herzegovina) Samed Baždar
- (Bosnia and Herzegovina) Bojan Nastić

Brazil

- (Brazil) Bruno
- (Brazil) Guilherme
- (Brazil) Hermes

Cameroon

- (Cameroon) Enzo Ebosse

Croatia

- (Croatia) Ivan Runje

Czech Republic

- (Czech Republic) Martin Pospíšil
- (Czech Republic) Tomáš Přikryl
- (Czech Republic) Michal Sáček

DR Congo

- (Democratic Republic of the Congo) Afimico Pululu

Estonia

- (Estonia) Konstantin Vassiljev

France

- (France) Lamine Diaby-Fadiga

Germany

- (Germany) Marco Reich

Georgia

- (Georgia (country)) Nika Dzalamidze
- (Georgia (country)) Giorgi Popkhadze

Iceland

- (Iceland) Böðvar Böðvarsson

Lithuania

- (Lithuania) Fedor Černych
- (Lithuania) Arvydas Novikovas
- (Lithuania) Andrius Skerla

Madagascar

- (Madagascar) Andy Pelmard

Nigeria

- (Nigeria) Ugo Ukah

North Macedonia

- (North Macedonia) Darko Churlinov

Norway

- (Norway) Kristoffer Normann Hansen

Palestine

- (Palestine) Alexis Norambuena

Poland

- (Poland) Sławomir Abramowicz
- (Poland) Rafał Augustyniak
- (Poland) Dariusz Bayer
- (Poland) Jacek Bayer
- (Poland) Thiago Cionek
- (Poland) Marek Citko
- (Poland) Dariusz Czykier
- (Poland) Maciej Gajos
- (Poland) Bartłomiej Drągowski
- (Poland) Przemysław Frankowski
- (Poland) Tomasz Frankowski
- (Poland) Jacek Góralski
- (Poland) Kamil Grosicki
- (Poland) Rafał Grzyb
- (Poland) Kamil Jóźwiak
- (Poland) Radosław Kałużny
- (Poland) Damian Kądzior
- (Poland) Antoni Komendo-Borowski
- (Poland) Tomasz Kupisz
- (Poland) Jarosław Lato
- (Poland) Igor Lewczuk
- (Poland) Maciej Makuszewski
- (Poland) Dominik Marczuk
- (Poland) Bartosz Mazurek
- (Poland) Michał Pazdan
- (Poland) Oskar Pietuszewski
- (Poland) Grzegorz Rasiak
- (Poland) Taras Romanczuk
- (Poland) Grzegorz Sandomierski
- (Poland) Mateusz Skrzypczak
- (Poland) Jakub Słowik
- (Poland) Ebi Smolarek
- (Poland) Radosław Sobolewski
- (Poland) Karol Struski
- (Poland) Damian Szymański
- (Poland) Karol Świderski
- (Poland) Tomasz Wałdoch
- (Poland) Bartłomiej Wdowik
- (Poland) Norbert Wojtuszek
- (Poland) Łukasz Załuska

Portugal

- (Portugal) João Moutinho

Republic of Ireland

- (Republic of Ireland) Cillian Sheridan

Romania

- (Romania) Bogdan Țîru

Serbia

- (Serbia) Zlatan Alomerović

Slovakia

- (Slovakia) Marián Kelemen

Spain

- (Spain) Adrián Diéguez
- (Spain) Alejandro Pozo
- (Spain) Dani Quintana

United States

- (United States) Aziel Jackson

== Current staff ==
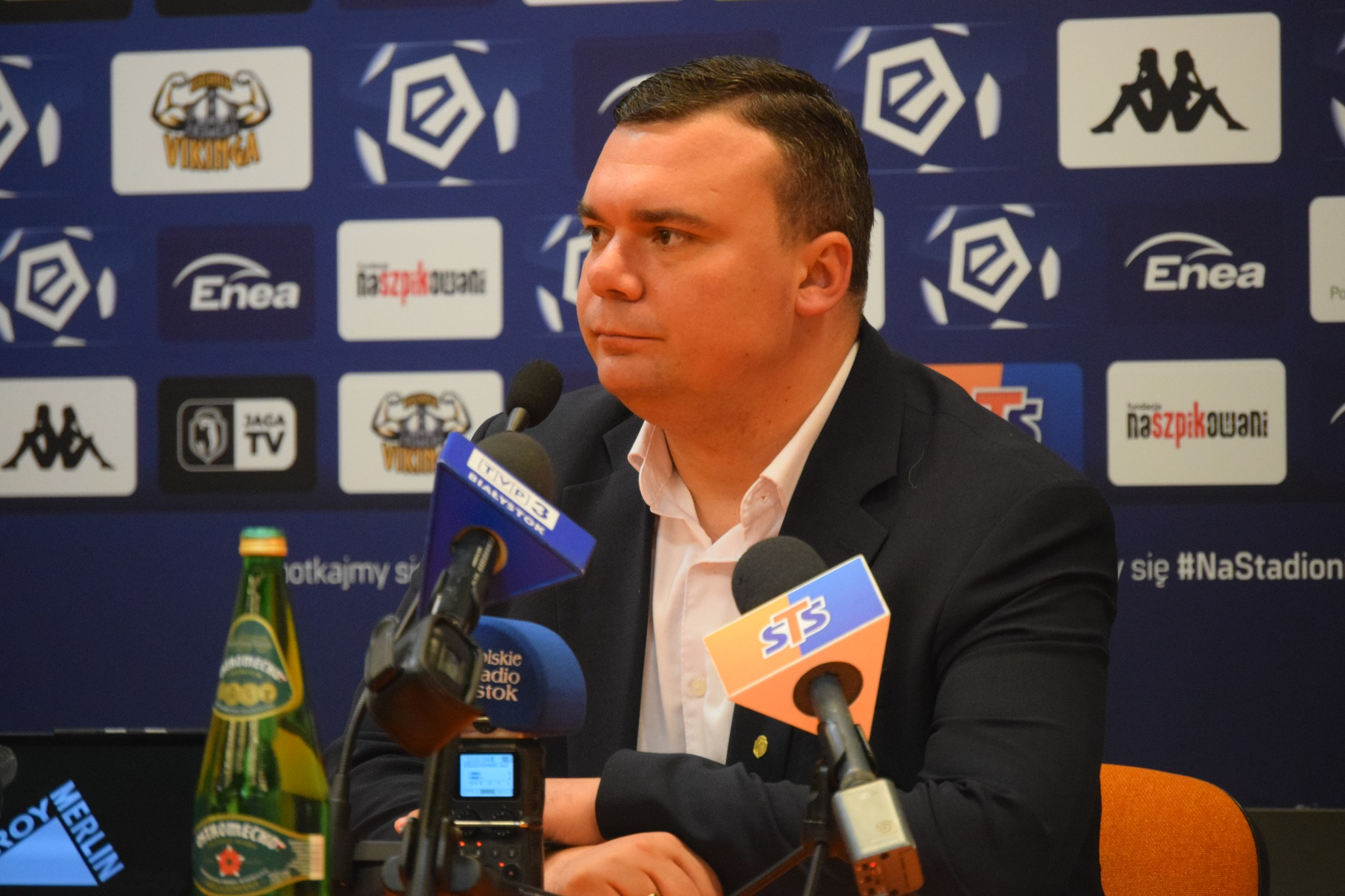
Adrian Siemieniec at a post-match press conference in 2024

As of 1 August 2026

Manager	(Poland) Adrian Siemieniec
Assistant manager	(Brazil) Hermes
Assistant coaches	(Poland) Tomasz Byszko (Poland) Mikołaj Łuczak (Poland) Krzysztof Szynke
Goalkeeping coach	(Poland) Mariusz Bołdyn
Assistant goalkeeping coach	(Poland) Grzegorz Sandomierski
Match analysts	(Poland) Wiktor Kask (Poland) Maciej Majdowski
Fitness coaches	(Poland) Przemysław Franczak (Poland) Maciej Idczak (Poland) Maciej Zieniewicz
Physiotherapists	(Poland) Gaweł Dojlido (Poland) Paweł Klimiuk (Poland) Marcin Piechowski (Poland) Stanisław Wilczyński
Team manager	(Poland) Arkadiusz Szczęsny
Kitman	(Poland) Wiktor Grabowski

== Managers ==
As of 15 September 2023

- (Poland) Janusz Wójcik (1 Jan 1986 – 20 Oct 1987)
- (Poland) Witold Mroziewski (15 May 1993 – 11 May 1994)
- (Poland) Bohdan Kucharski (1994)
- (Poland) Kazimierz Michalczuk (1994)
- (Poland) Ryszard Karalus (1995–96)
- (Poland) Leonard Aleksandrów (1996–97)
- (Poland) Andrzej Kaczewski (1996–97)
- (Poland) Piotr Wiśnik (1996–97)
- (Poland) Mirosław Mojsiuszko (1997)
- (Lithuania) Algimantas Liubinskas (1 Jul 1998 – 31 Dec 1998)
- (Poland) Grzegorz Szerszenowicz (1998–99)
- (Poland) Jarosław Bartnowski (1999)
- (Poland) Witold Mroziewski (1 Jul 1999 – 30 Jun 2000)
- (Poland) Tadeusz Gaszyński (2000–01)
- (Poland) Wojciech Łazarek (26 Jun 2001 – 3 Jun 2002)
- (Poland) Witold Mroziewski (3 Jun 2002 – 7 Aug 2004)
- (Poland) Mirosław Dymek (7 Aug 2004 – 31 Aug 2004)
- (Poland) Adam Nawałka (1 Sep 2004 – 20 Apr 2006)
- (Poland) Mirosław Dymek (interim) (20 Apr 2006 – 25 Apr 2006)
- (Ukraine) Yuriy Shatalov (25 Apr 2006 – 29 Jun 2006)
- (Poland) Ryszard Tarasiewicz (29 Jun 2006 – 25 Apr 2007)
- (Poland) Artur Płatek (26 Apr 2007 – 27 Apr 2008)
- (Poland) Dariusz Czykier (interim) (27 Apr 2008 – 11 May 2008)
- (Poland) Stefan Białas (12 May 2008 – 15 Jun 2008)
- (Poland) Michał Probierz (5 Jul 2008 – 22 Jul 2011)
- (Poland) Czesław Michniewicz (22 Jul 2011 – 22 Dec 2011)
- (Poland) Tomasz Hajto (9 Jan 2012 – 21 Jun 2013)
- (Poland) Piotr Stokowiec (17 Jun 2013 – 7 Apr 2014)
- (Poland) Michał Probierz (7 Apr 2014 – 4 Jun 2017)
- (Poland) Ireneusz Mamrot (12 Jun 2017 – 8 Dec 2019)
- (Poland) Rafał Grzyb (interim) (8 Dec 2019 – 30 Dec 2019)
- (Bulgaria) Ivaylo Petev (30 Dec 2019 – 31 Jul 2020)
- (Poland) Bogdan Zając (31 Jul 2020 – 4 Jun 2021)
- (Poland) Ireneusz Mamrot (4 Jun 2021 – 23 Dec 2021)
- (Poland) Piotr Nowak (31 Dec 2021 – 10 Jun 2022)
- (Poland) Maciej Stolarczyk (14 Jun 2022 – 3 Apr 2023)
- (Poland) Adrian Siemieniec (4 Apr 2023 – present)

== Club records ==
=== Most appearances ===
Players with the most appearances for Jagiellonia in Ekstraklasa:

As of 28 August 2025

#	Name	Career	Appearances
1	**Taras Romanczuk**	2014–	333
2	Rafał Grzyb	2010–2019	242
3	**Jesús Imaz**	2019–	193
4	Martin Pospíšil	2017–2023	182
5	Alexis Norambuena	2008–2014	146
6	Fedor Černych	2015–2018, 2020–2023	143
7	Przemysław Frankowski	2014–2019	140
8	Ivan Runje	2016–2023	138
9	Tomasz Kupisz	2010–2013, 2022–2024	133
10	Tomasz Frankowski	1992–1993, 2008–2013	129

**Bold** – still active

=== Top goalscorers ===
Players with the most goals for Jagiellonia in Ekstraklasa:

As of 28 August 2025

#	Player	Career	Goals
1	**Jesús Imaz**	2019–	86
2	Tomasz Frankowski	1992–1993, 2008–2013	53
3	**Taras Romanczuk**	2014–	31
4	Przemysław Frankowski	2014–2019	24
4	Fedor Černych	2015–2018, 2020–2023	24
4	**Afimico Pululu**	2023–	24
7	Mateusz Piątkowski	2013–2015	21
8	Dani Quintana	2012–2015	20
8	Jacek Bayer	1981–1994	20
8	Konstantin Vassiljev	2015–2017	20
8	Karol Świderski	2014–2019	20

**Bold** – still active

== Individual records ==
=== Youngest first-team player ===
Player	Age	Debut
Przemysław Mystkowski	16 years, 36 days	31 May 2014, vs. Cracovia
Karol Buzun	16 years, 60 days	3 May 2012, vs. Śląsk Wrocław
Oliwier Wojciechowski	16 years, 122 days	1 August 2021, vs. Raków Częstochowa

=== Golden boot ===
Player	Goals	League	Season
Jacek Bayer	23	I liga	1986–87
Tomasz Frankowski	14	Ekstraklasa	2010–11
Marc Gual	15	Ekstraklasa	2022–23
Afimico Pululu	8	UEFA Conference League	2024–25

== Honours ==
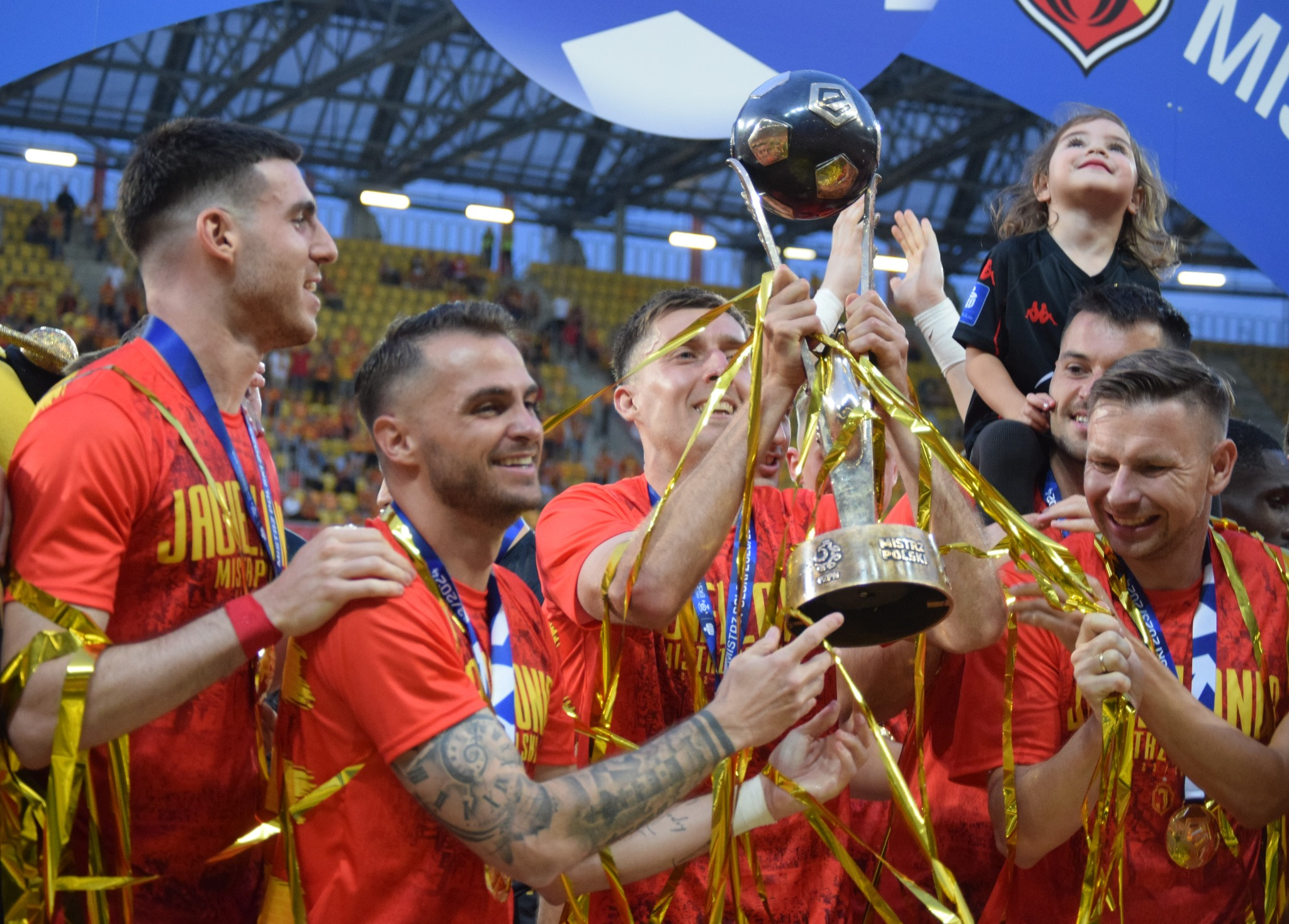
Celebration after winning the Polish 2023–24 Polish Championship

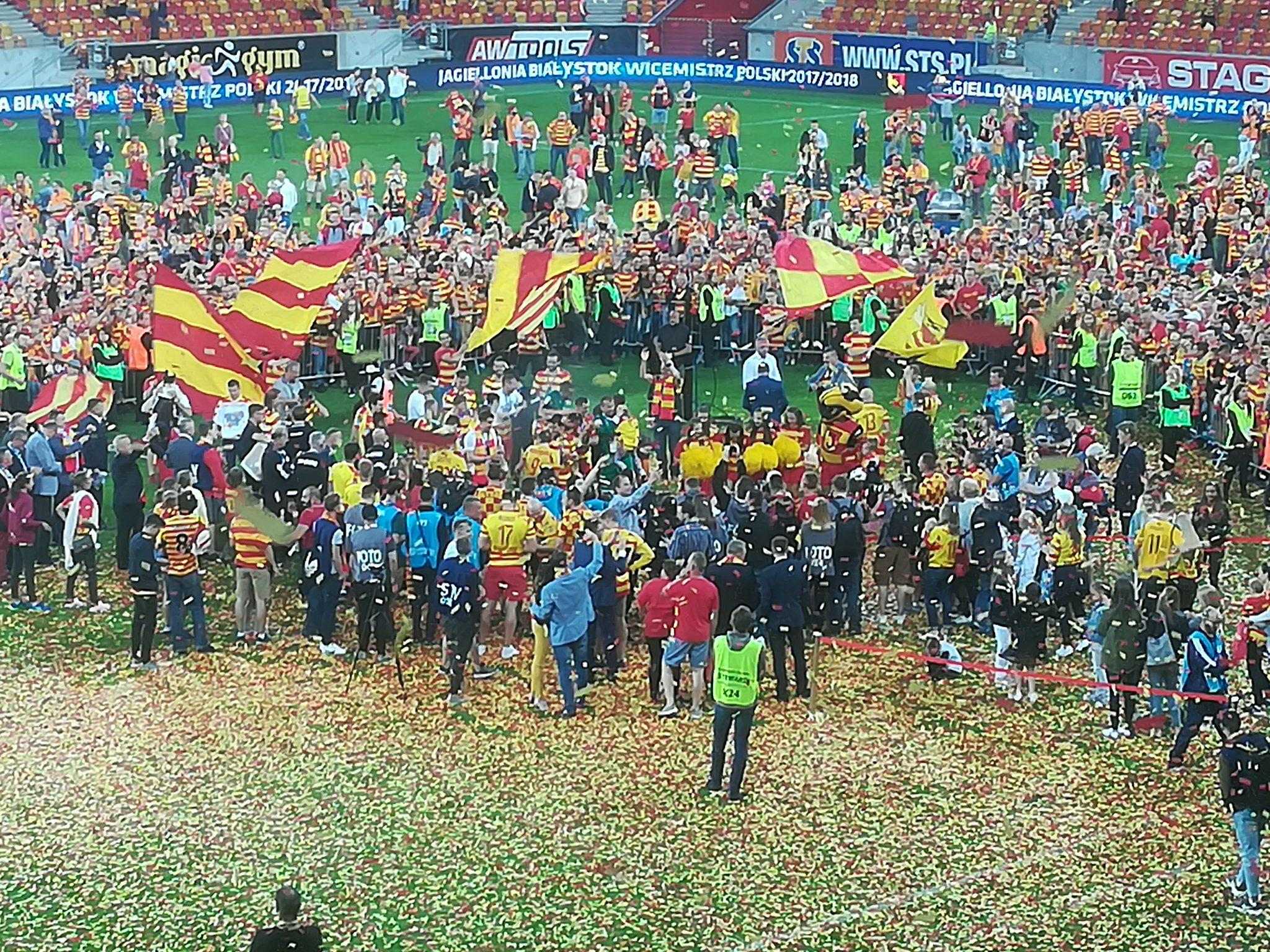
Celebration after winning the 2017–18 Polish vice-championship

=== League ===
- Ekstraklasa
  - Champions: 2023–24
  - Runners-up: 2016–17, 2017–18
- I liga
  - Champions: 1986–87

=== Cup ===
- Polish Cup
  - Winners: 2009–10
  - Runners-up: 1988–89, 2018–19
- Polish Super Cup
  - Winners: 2010, 2024

== Jagiellonia Białystok in Europe ==
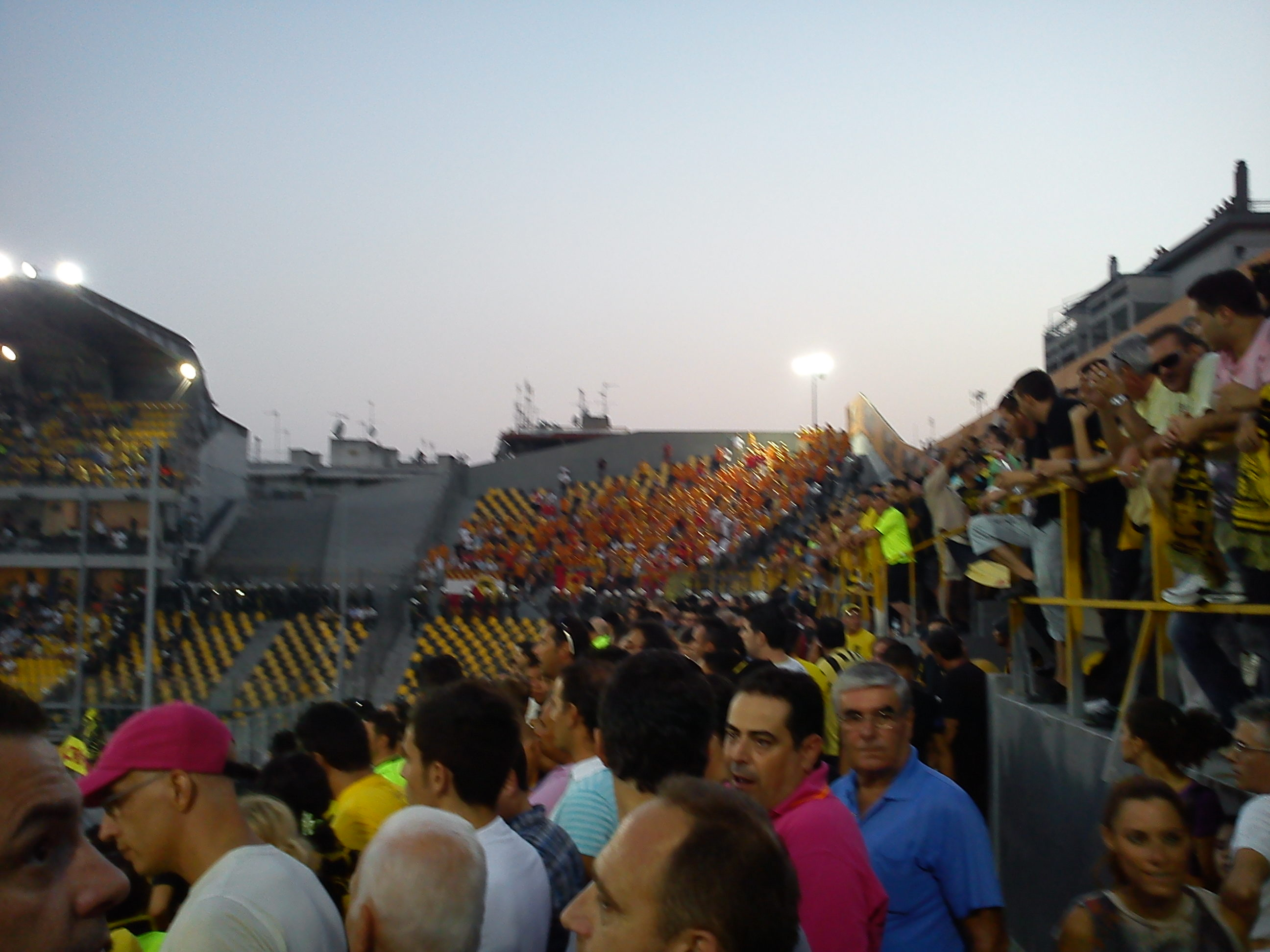
Fans of Jagiellonia at a match against Aris (2010)

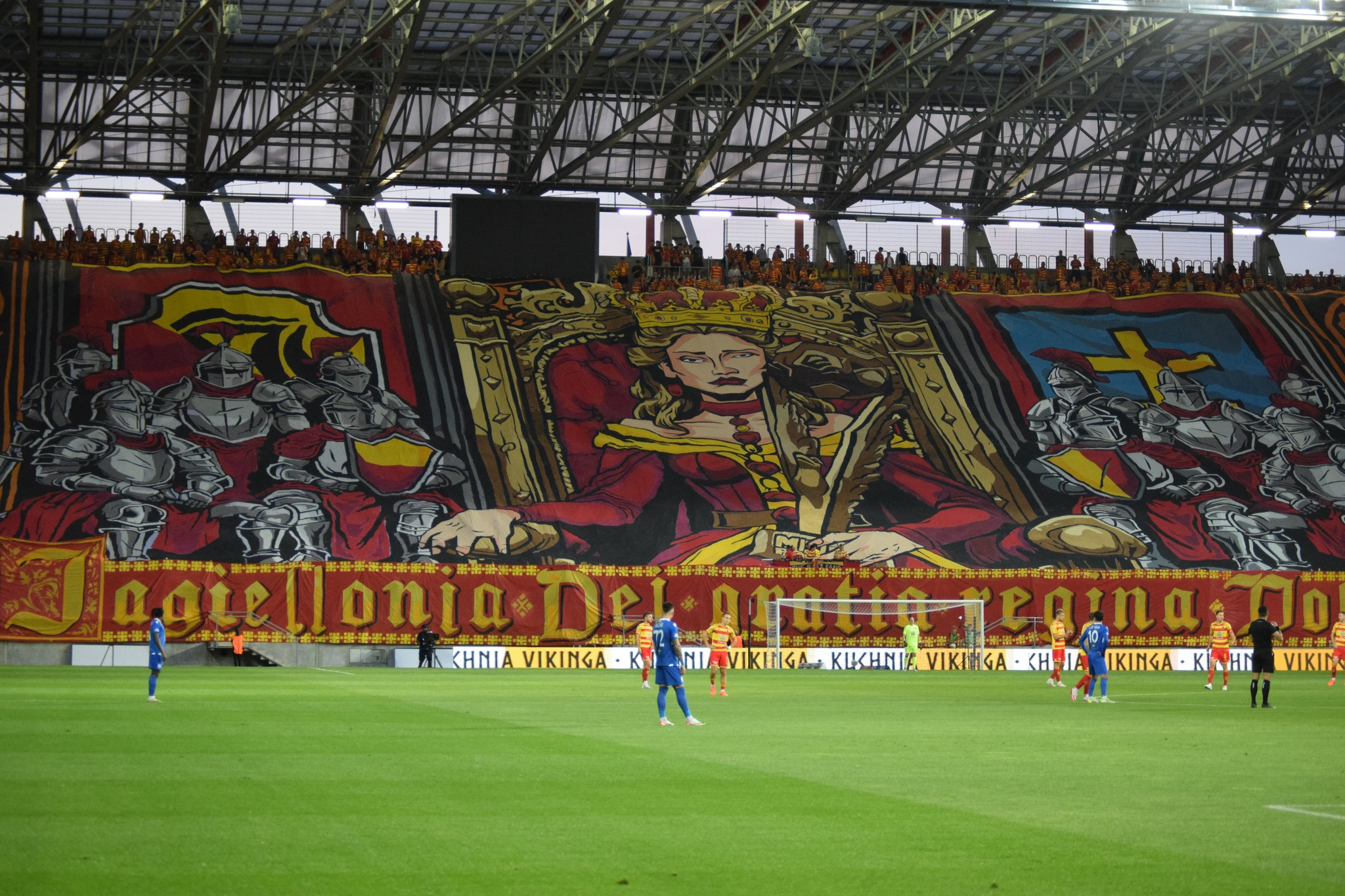
Jagiellonia 3–1 Panevėžys (2024)

Jagiellonia Białystok scores are given first in all scorelines.

Season	Competition	Round	Opponent	Home	Away	Aggregate
2010–11	UEFA Europa League	3Q	(Greece) Aris Thessaloniki	1–2	2–2	3–4
2011–12	UEFA Europa League	1Q	(Kazakhstan) Irtysh Pavlodar	1–0	0–2	1–2
2015–16	UEFA Europa League	1Q	(Lithuania) Kruoja Pakruojis	8–0	1–0	9–0
2015–16	UEFA Europa League	2Q	(Cyprus) Omonia	0–0	0–1	0–1
2017–18	UEFA Europa League	1Q	(Georgia (country)) Dinamo Batumi	4–0	1–0	5–0
2017–18	UEFA Europa League	2Q	(Azerbaijan) Gabala	0–2	1–1	1–3
2018–19	UEFA Europa League	2Q	(Portugal) Rio Ave	1–0	4–4	5–4
2018–19	UEFA Europa League	3Q	(Belgium) Gent	0–1	1–3	1–4
2024–25	UEFA Champions League	2Q	(Lithuania) Panevėžys	3−1	4–0	7–1
2024–25	UEFA Champions League	3Q	(Norway) Bodø/Glimt	0–1	1–4	1–5
2024–25	UEFA Europa League	PO	(Netherlands) Ajax	1–4	0–3	1–7
2024–25	UEFA Conference League	LP	(Denmark) Copenhagen	—N/a	2–1	9th
2024–25	UEFA Conference League	LP	(Moldova) Petrocub Hîncești	2–0	—N/a	9th
2024–25	UEFA Conference League	LP	(Norway) Molde	3–0	—N/a	9th
2024–25	UEFA Conference League	LP	(Slovenia) Celje	—N/a	3–3	9th
2024–25	UEFA Conference League	LP	(Czech Republic) Mladá Boleslav	—N/a	0–1	9th
2024–25	UEFA Conference League	LP	(Slovenia) Olimpija Ljubljana	0–0	—N/a	9th
2024–25	UEFA Conference League	KPO	(Serbia) TSC	3–1	3–1	6–2
2024–25	UEFA Conference League	R16	(Belgium) Cercle Brugge	3–0	0–2	3–2
2024–25	UEFA Conference League	QF	(Spain) Real Betis	1–1	0–2	1–3
2025–26	UEFA Conference League	2Q	(Serbia) Novi Pazar	3–1	2–1	5–2
2025–26	UEFA Conference League	3Q	(Denmark) Silkeborg	2–2	1–0	3–2
2025–26	UEFA Conference League	PO	(Albania) Dinamo City	3–0	1–1	4–1
2025–26	UEFA Conference League	LP	(Malta) Hamrun Spartans	1–0	—N/a	17th
2025–26	UEFA Conference League	LP	(France) Strasbourg	—N/a	1–1	17th
2025–26	UEFA Conference League	LP	(North Macedonia) Shkëndija	—N/a	1–1	17th
2025–26	UEFA Conference League	LP	(Finland) KuPS	1–0	—N/a	17th
2025–26	UEFA Conference League	LP	(Spain) Rayo Vallecano	1–2	—N/a	17th
2025–26	UEFA Conference League	LP	(Netherlands) AZ	—N/a	0–0	17th
2025–26	UEFA Conference League	KPO	(Italy) Fiorentina	0–3	4–2 (a.e.t.)	4–5
2026–27	UEFA Europa League	3Q	(Scotland) Rangers	2–1	1–1	3–2
2026–27	UEFA Europa League	PO	(Georgia (country)) Iberia 1999	4–0	2–1	6–1
2026–27	UEFA Europa League	LP	(Greece) Olympiacos	—N/a	1–2	
2026–27	UEFA Europa League	LP	Ararat-Armenia	3–1	—N/a	
2026–27	UEFA Europa League	LP	(Belgium) Anderlecht	0–3	—N/a	
2026–27	UEFA Europa League	LP	(Bulgaria) Levski Sofia	—N/a	0–1	
2026–27	UEFA Europa League	LP	(England) Sunderland	—N/a		
2026–27	UEFA Europa League	LP	(England) Crystal Palace		—N/a	
2026–27	UEFA Europa League	LP	(France) Lyon		—N/a	
2026–27	UEFA Europa League	LP	(Czech Republic) Viktoria Plzeň	—N/a		

== Ground ==
Jagiellonia's first formal stadium was constructed in 1971 and had 15,000 seats. Two years later the stadium's capacity was doubled. It was originally named Hetman Białystok stadium or guards stadium. In 2006, the stadium was taken over by the city of Białystok and renamed Stadion Miejski (Municipal Stadium) which is where the club currently plays their home games. In 2008, a French-Polish construction company took on the task of renovating the stadium to become more modern. However, in 2012 due to delays the city terminated the contract with the company and hired a new company to finish the job. A Spanish-Polish consortium company was hired to finish the job for a sum of PLN 254 million (US$75 million). The new 22,372 seat stadium was completed at the end of 2014.

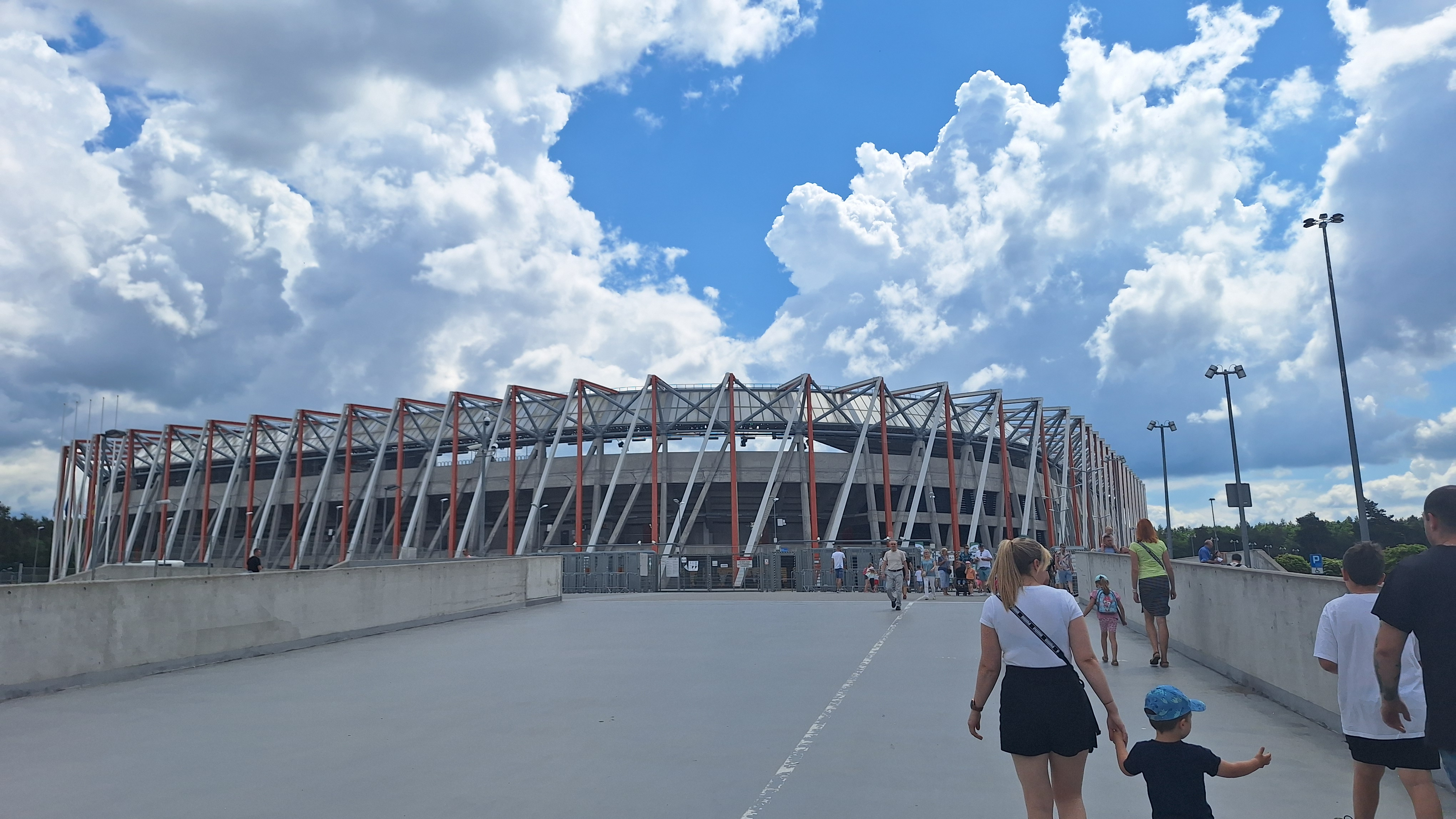
Municipal Stadium

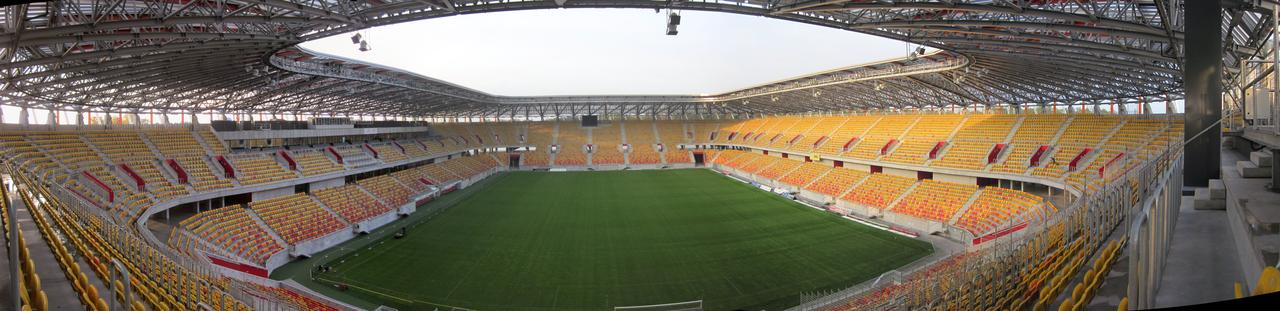
A Panorama view of the stadium interior

== Club anthem ==
The Polish version reads:

W mieście Białystok,

W tym w którym żyję,

Oddałem serce drużynie.

Ref. (2x): Wstań, unieś barwy,

Wsłuchaj się w słowa,

Pieśni o Mej Jagiellonii.

Moja drużyno,

Ma ukochana,

Pokonasz dzisiaj rywala.

Ref. (2x): Strzelisz 3 bramy,

I znów wygramy,

Klubie Ty Nasz ukochany!

In English it is loosely translated to:

In the city of Białystok,

Where I live,

I gave my heart to my team.

Chorus. (2x): Rise, lift up the colors,

Listen to the words,

Song of My Jagiellonia.

My team,

My loved one,

You will defeat your rival today.

Chorus. (2x): Shoot 3 goals,

And again we'll win,

Our beloved club you!

== Supporters ==
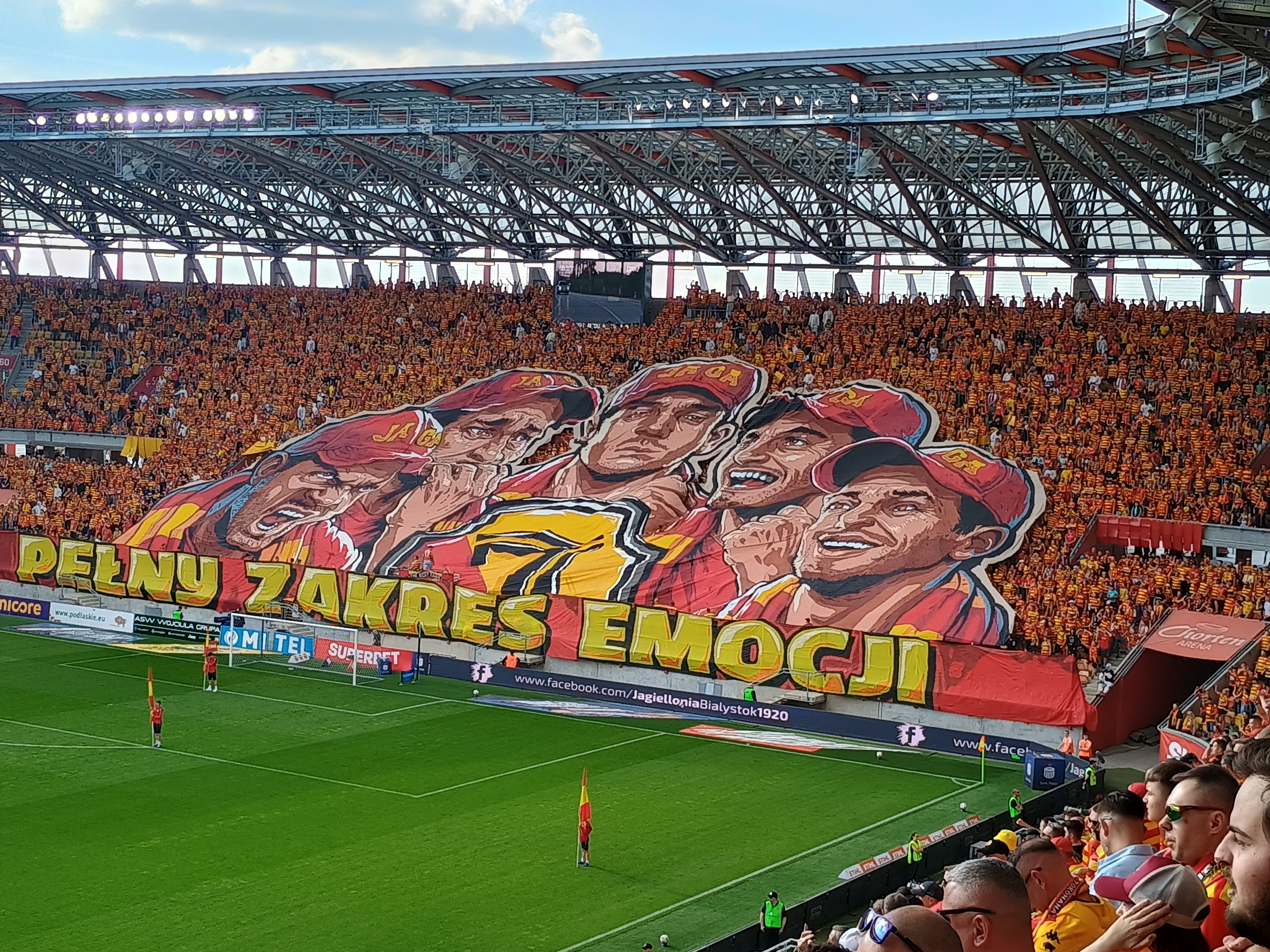
Jagiellonia fans during an Ekstraklasa game in 2026

The official representation of fans in contact with the club is the association of Children of Białystok. The main objective of the association is to unite all fans of Jagiellonia, in the stadium and in everyday life.

An important objective of Children of Białystok is to engage in sporting life, social and cultural, by organizing sporting events and entertainment for children, young people in schools, orphanages, educational centers, and helping people who are in need financially. Other important objectives of the association are:

- painting parts of the city of Białystok, and the Podlaskie voivodeship
- promote volunteering and to encourage voluntary blood drives
- promotion of physical culture, sports, tourism, and a healthy lifestyle

The creation of lighting and different choreography associated with the stadium is due in part by the Ultras Jagiellonia Białystok (UJB).

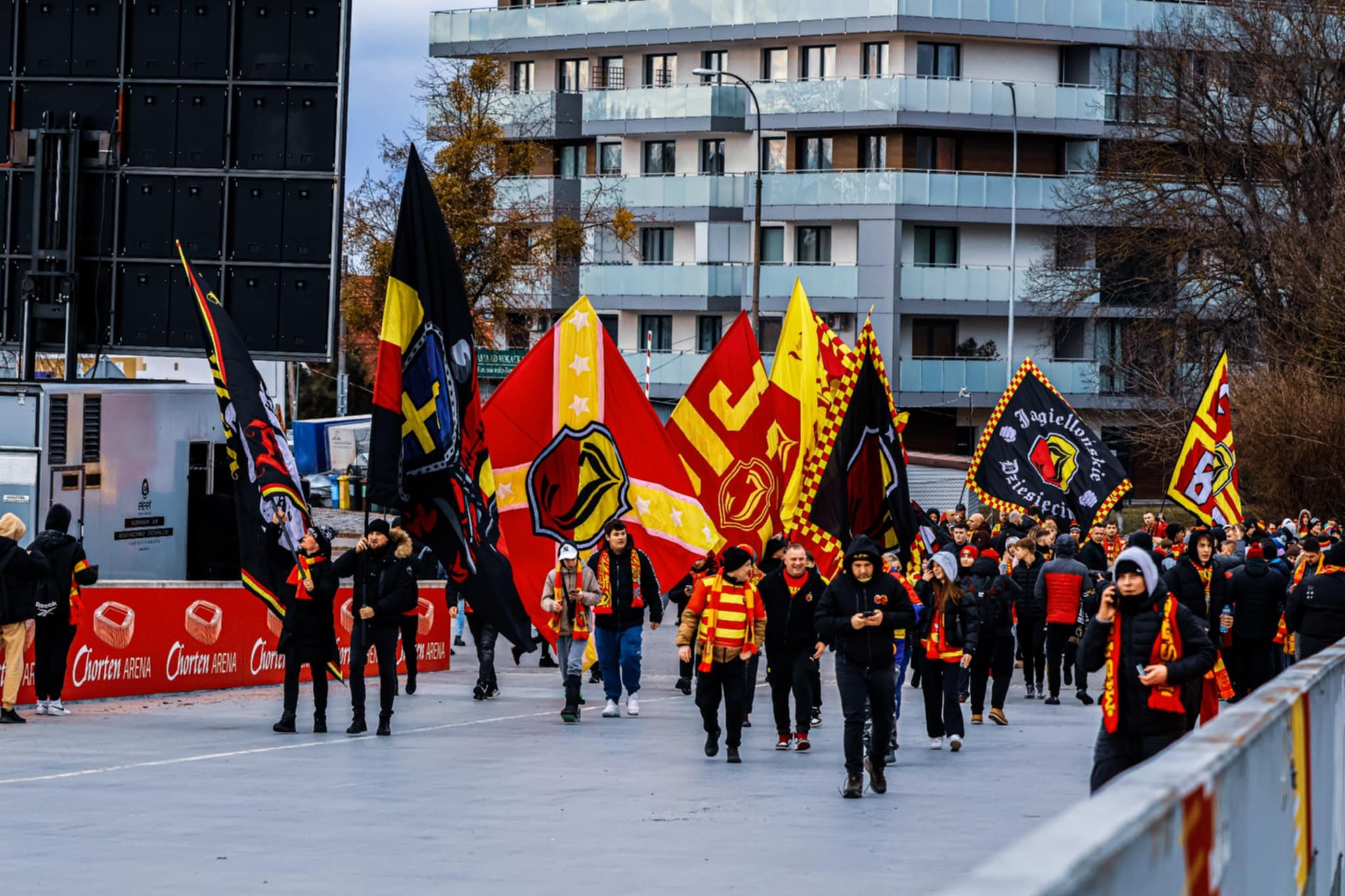
2025 Ultra Day

The most devoted fans of Jagiellonia Białystok celebrate Ultra Day every year on the day of the first home league match after the winter break.

== League results since 1947 ==
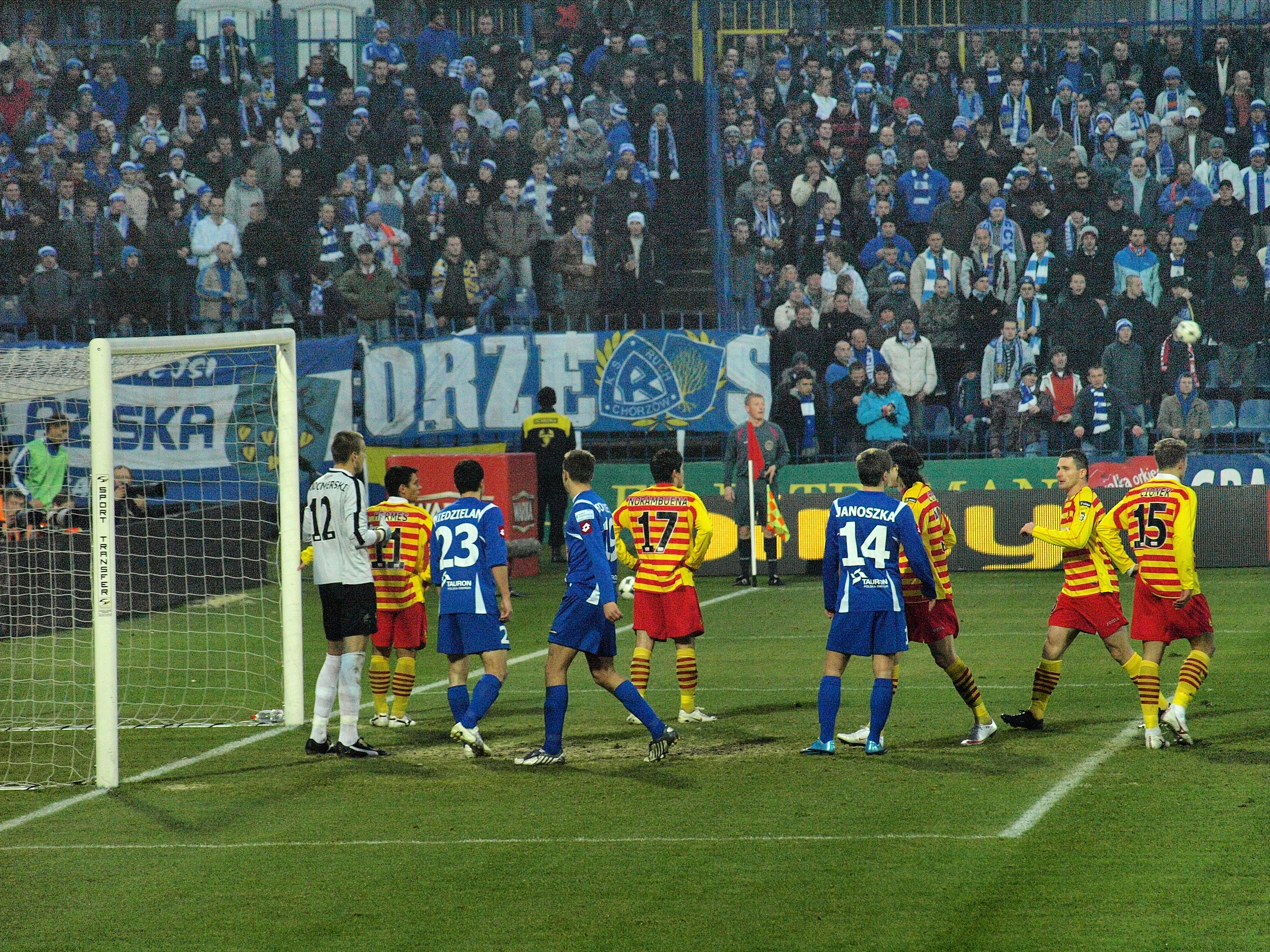
Ruch Chorzów – Jagiellonia Białystok (September 11, 2009)

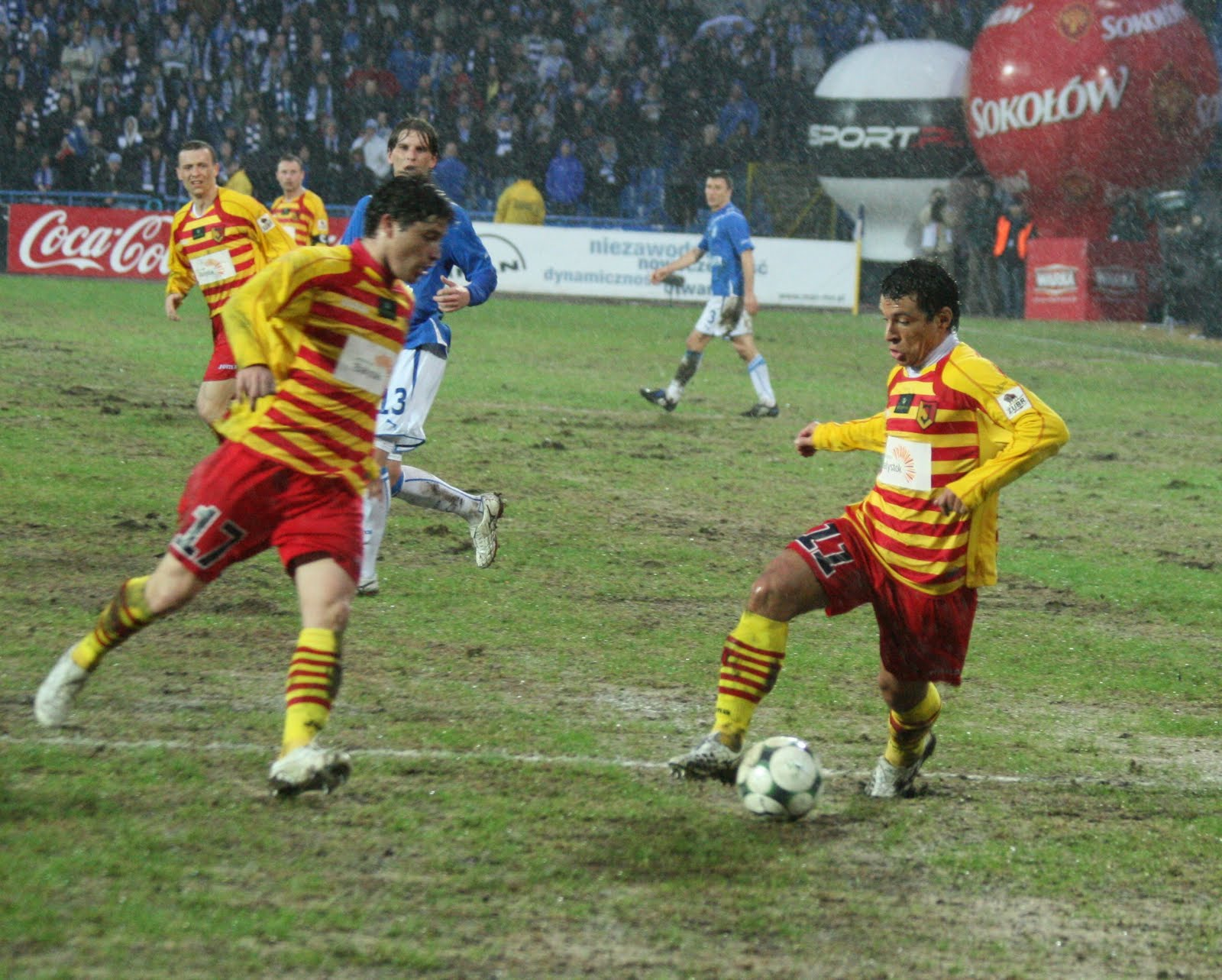
Lech Poznań – Jagiellonia (March 21, 2010)

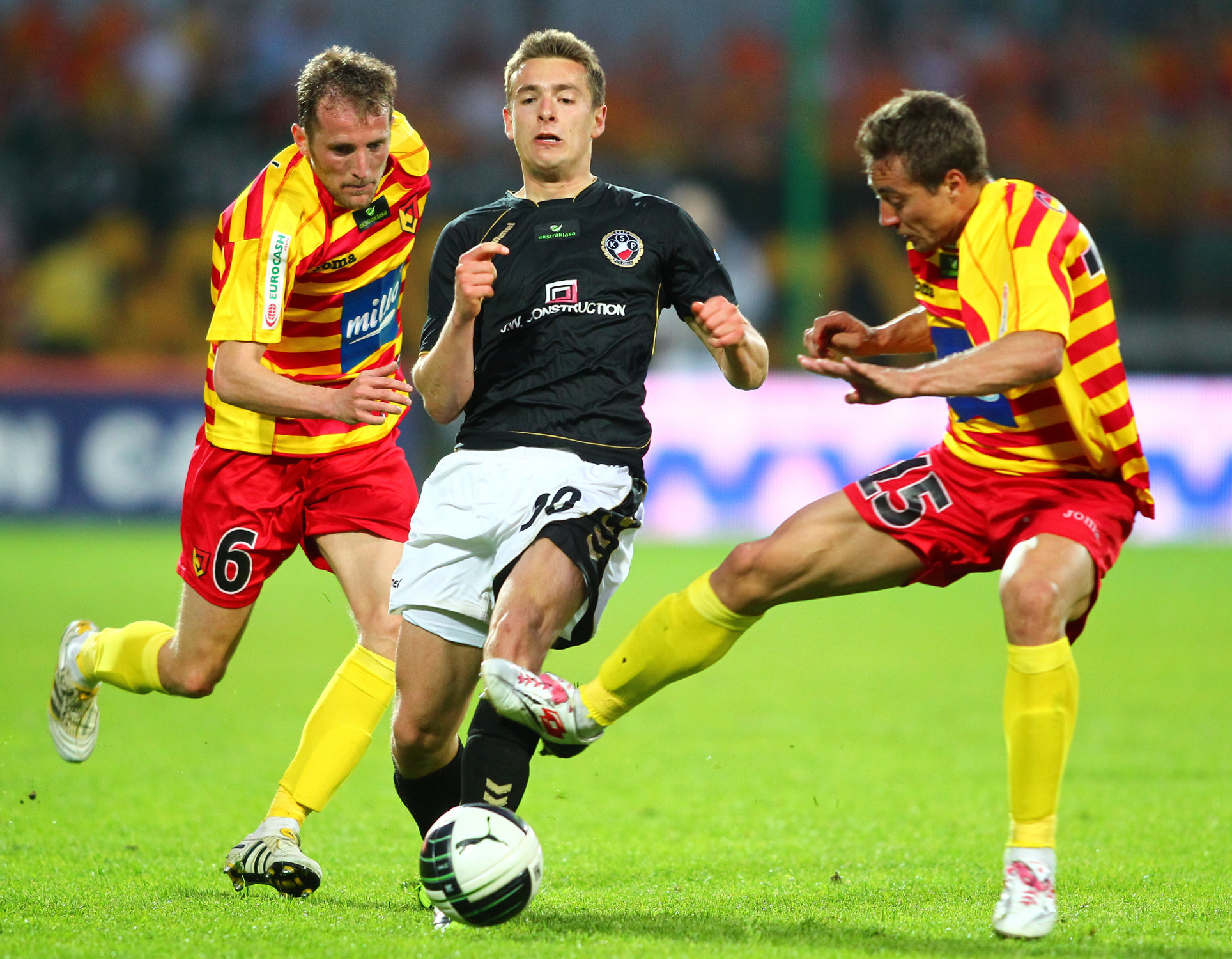
Polonia Warsaw – Jagiellonia (May 10, 2011)

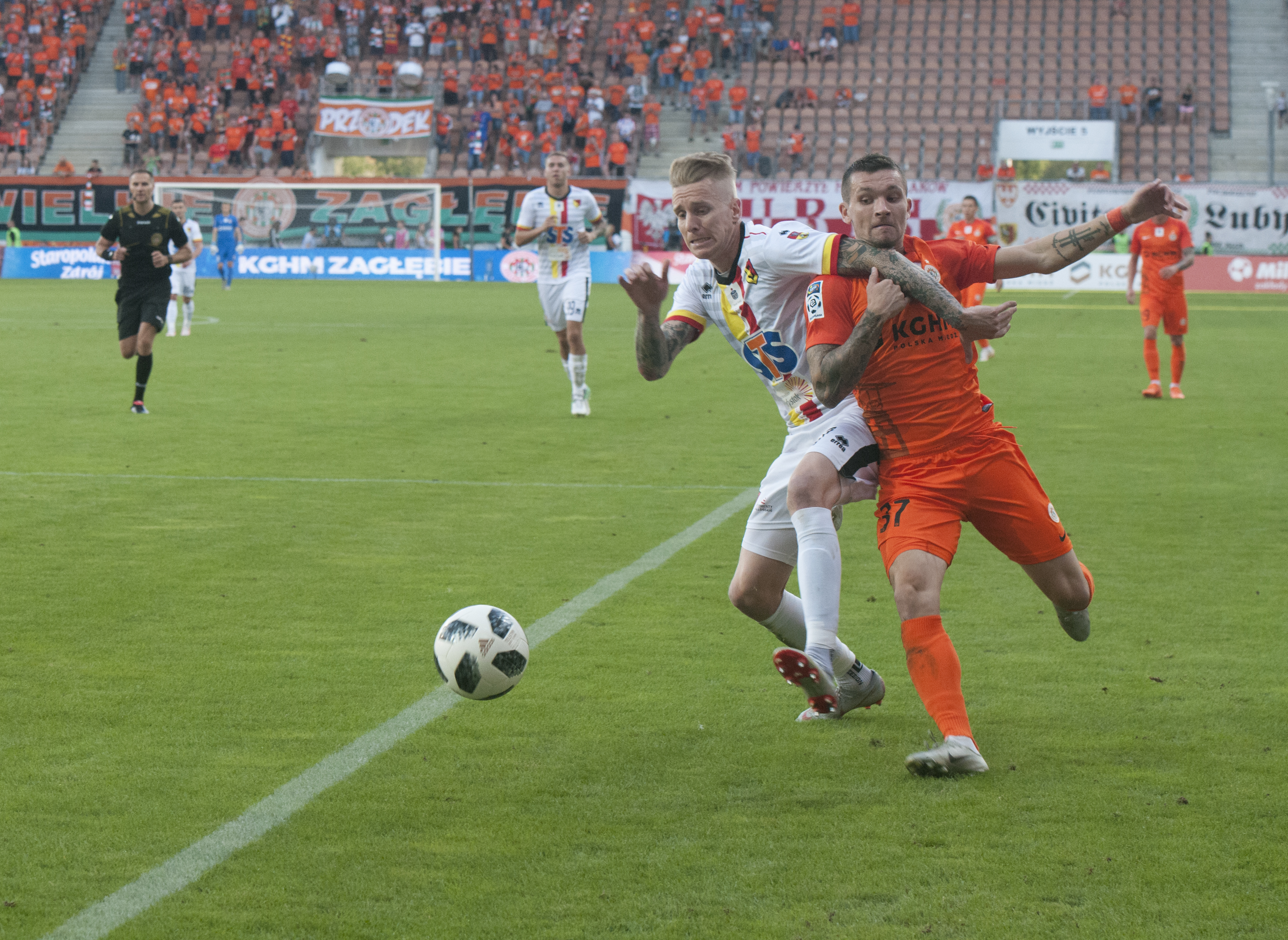
Zagłębie Lubin - Jagiellonia (2018)

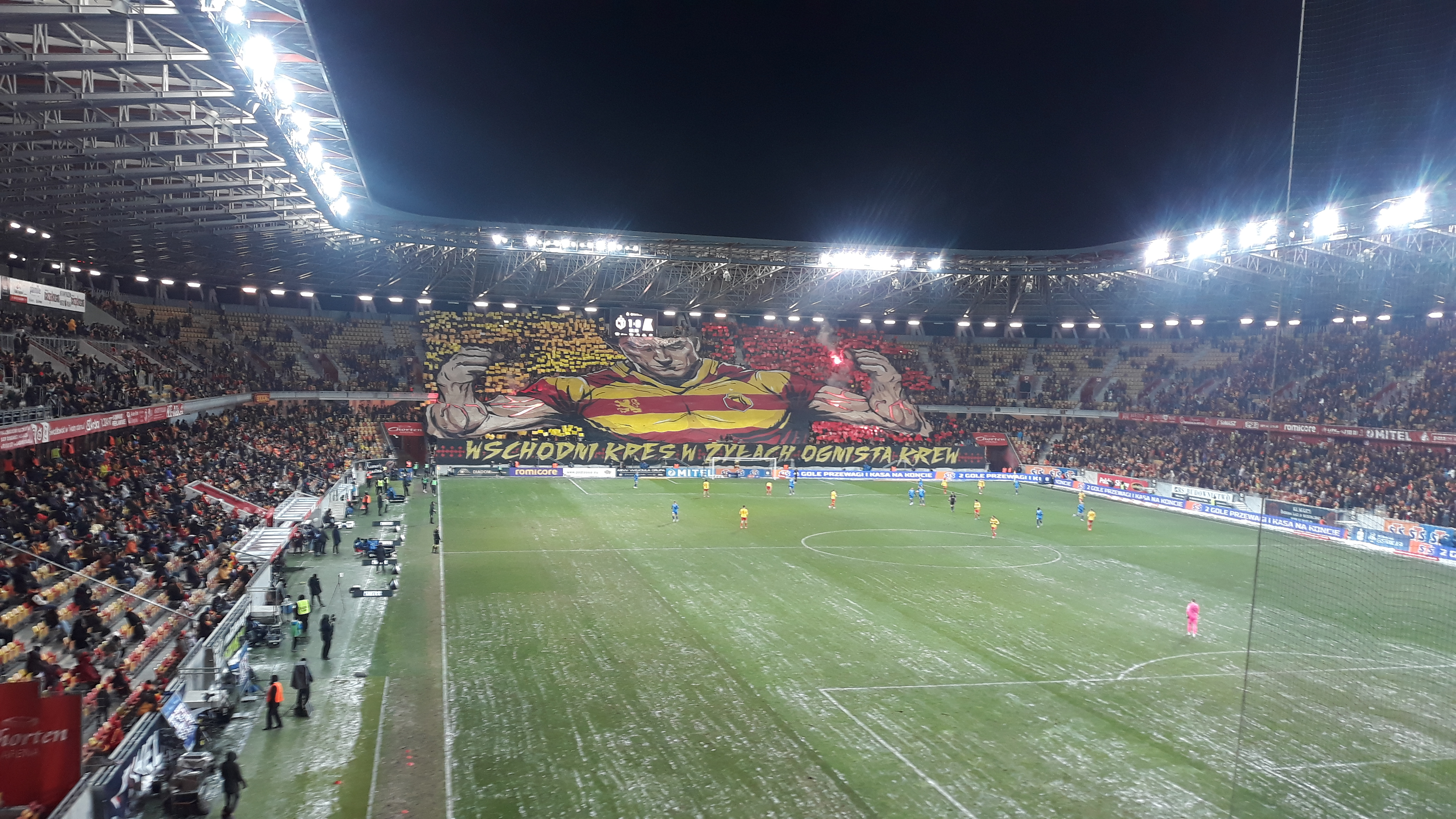
Jagiellonia - Motor Lublin (2025)

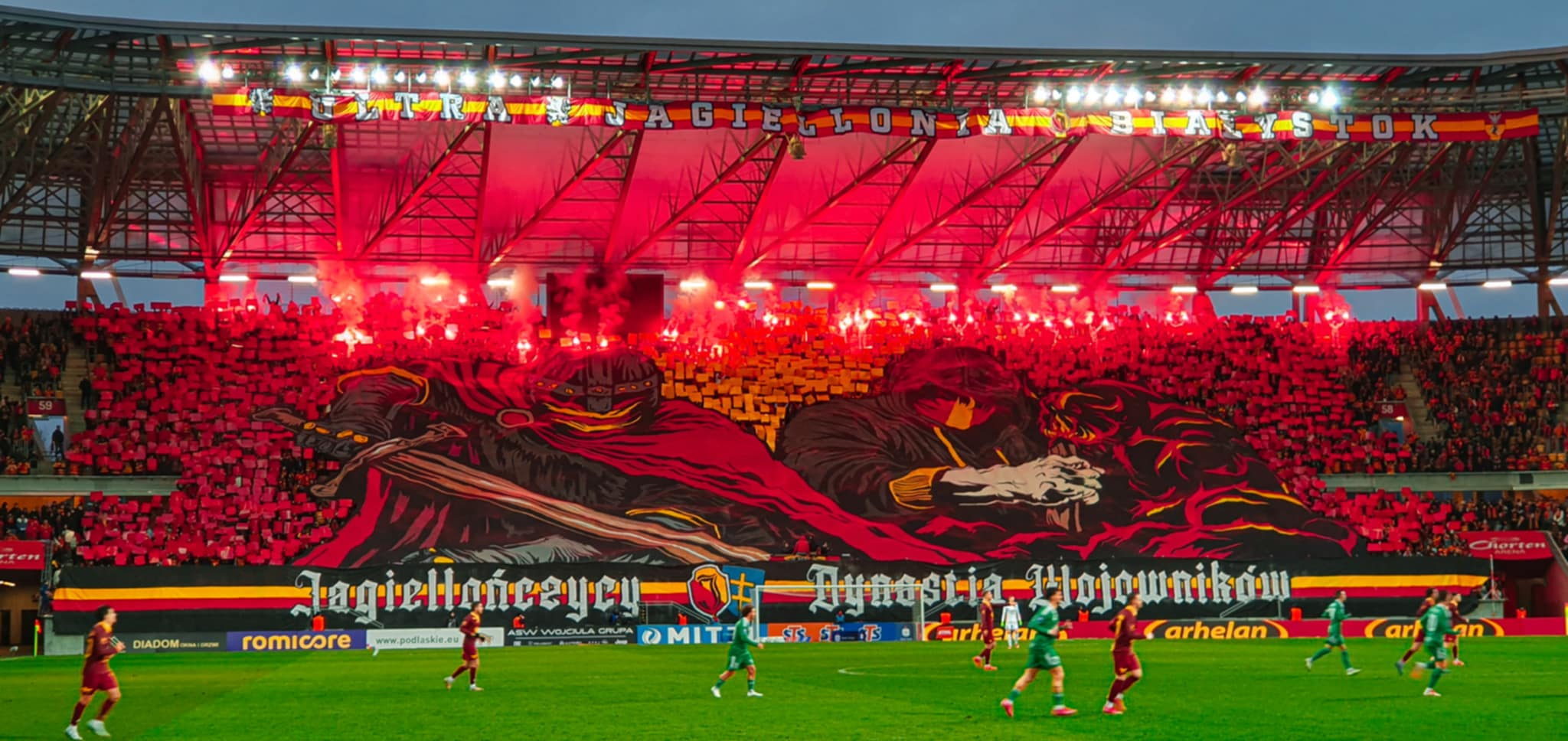
Jagiellonia - Radomiak Radom (2025)

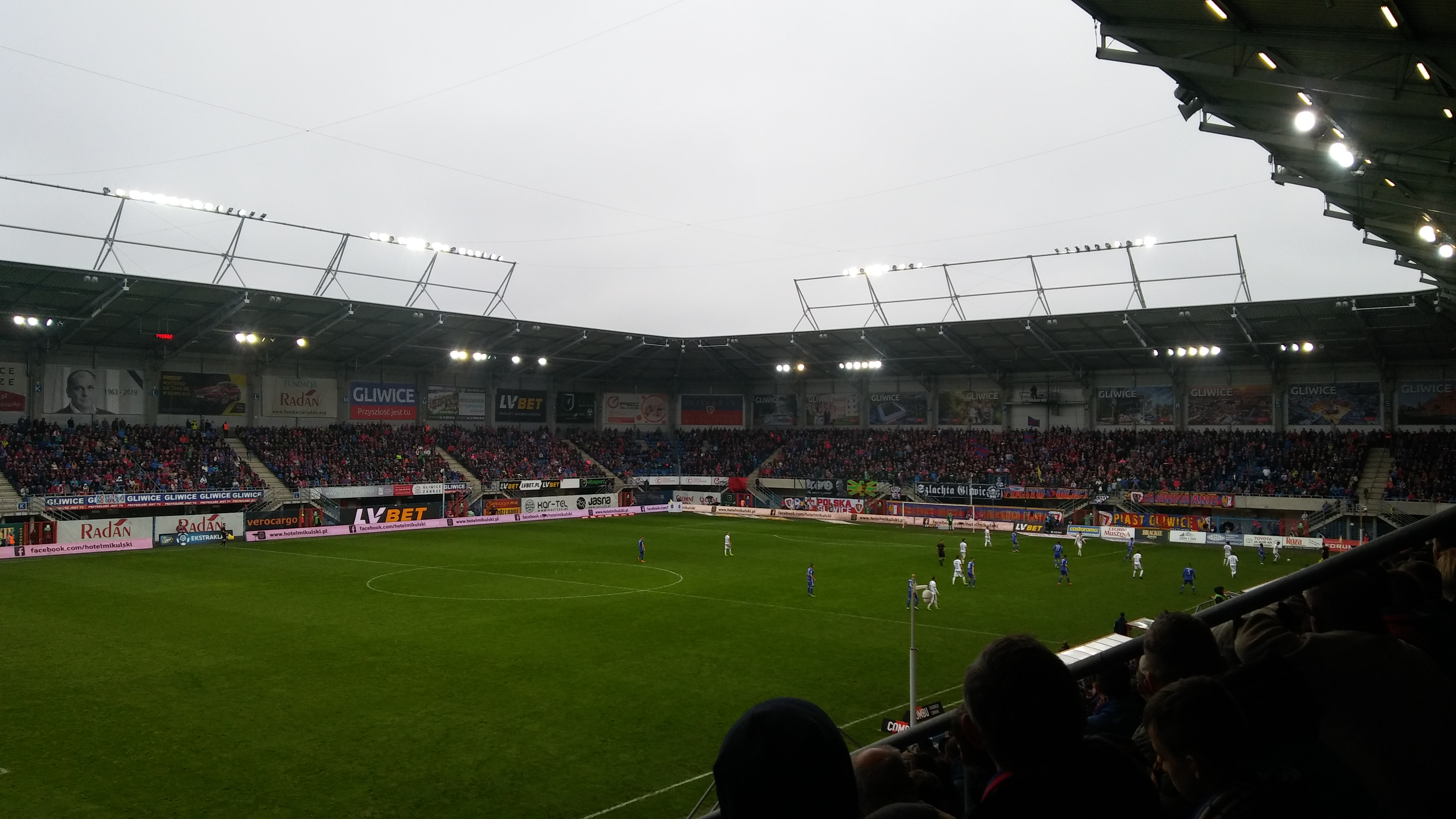
Piast Gliwice - Jagiellonia (2025)

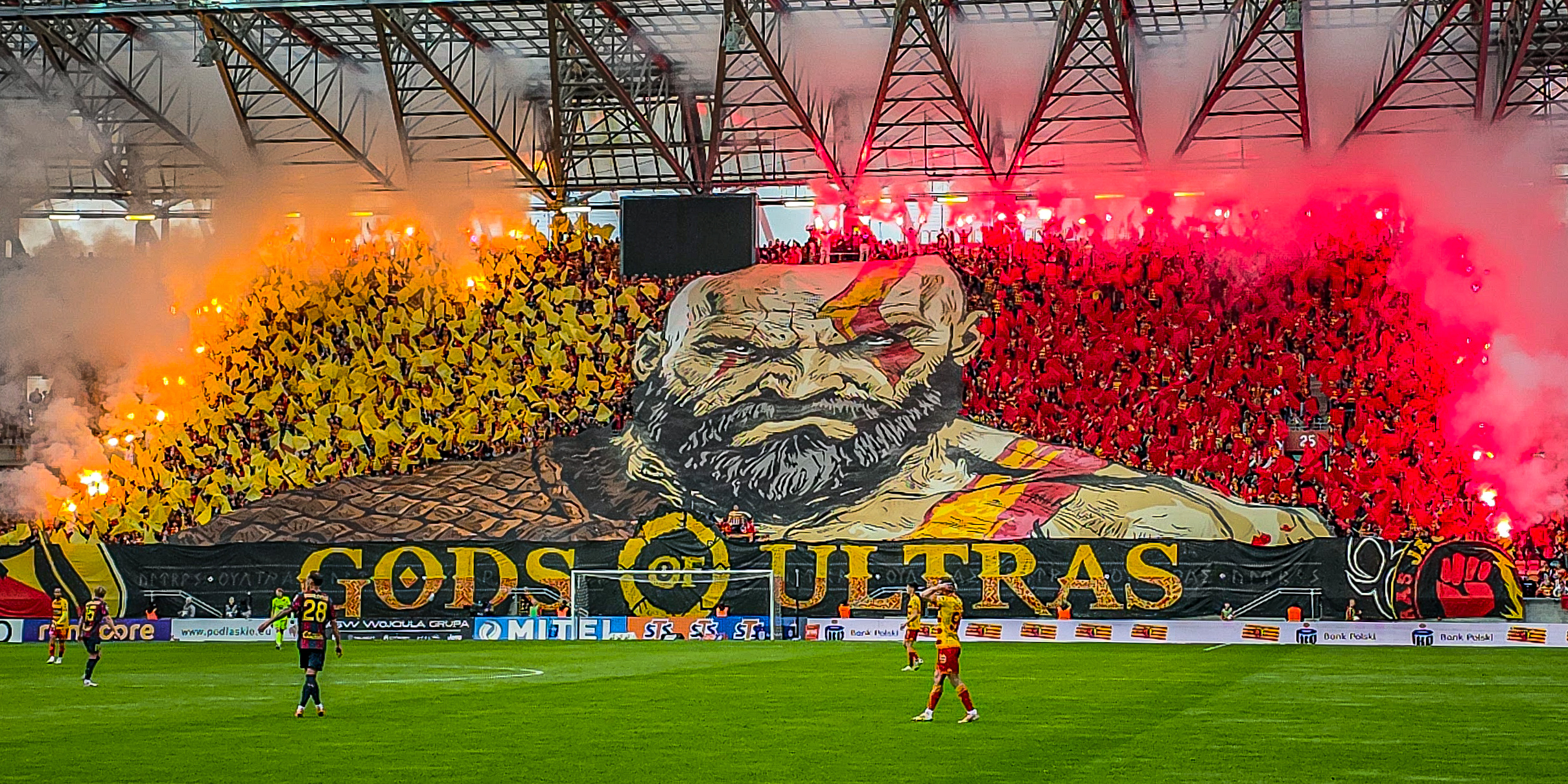
Jagiellonia - Pogoń Szczecin (2025)

Season	League	Position	Points	Goals	Notes
1947	Polish Championship	9	0		
1948	Klasa A	1	14	?	League reform
1949	Klasa A	2	15	?	
1949–50	Klasa A	4	10	?	
1951	I Klasa	1	14	?	Took part in promotion play-offs
1952	I Klasa	1		?	Took part in promotion play-offs
1953	Klasa B	1		?	Promotion through play-offs
1954	Klasa A	5	14	?	
1955	Klasa A	9	18	?	
1956	(withdrawn)				
1957	Klasa B	3	24	?	
1958	Klasa B			?	Promotion
1959	Klasa A	1	29	?	Promotion
1960	District league	5	10	?	
1960–61	District league	10	8	?	Relegation
1961–62	Klasa A	5	18	?	
1962–63	Klasa A	4	22	?	
1963–64	Klasa A	2	29	?	
1964–65	Klasa A	3	23	?	
1965–66	Klasa A	5	27	?	Promotion
1966–67	District league	7	20	?	
1967–68	District league	6	20	?	relegation
1968–69	A Klasa	11	16	?	
1969–70	A Klasa	1	36	?	Promotion
1970–71	District league	7	22	31–24	
1971–72	District league	3	30	40–17	
1972–73	District league	1	39	91–17	Promotion
1973–74	District league	1	48	90–15	Lost play-offs for promotion
1974–75	District league	1	37	68:12	Promotion through play-offs
1975–76	II liga (northern group)	9	29	36–37	
1976–77	II liga (northern group)	10	29	27–34	
1977–78	II liga (northern group)	15	20	29–51	Relegation
1978–79	III liga (group III)	4	28	38–30	
1979–80	III liga (group III)	1	45	51:10	Promotion
1980–81	II liga (eastern group)	15	20	22–55	Relegation
1981–82	III liga (group III)	5	31	39–26	
1982–83	III liga (group III)	1	45	66–15	Promotion
1983–84	II liga (eastern group)	12	29	29–35	
1984–85	II liga (eastern group)	7	31	27–25	
1985–86	II liga (eastern group)	3	35	36–24	
1986–87	II liga (eastern group)	1	55	51–13	Promotion
1987–88	I liga	8	29	24–25	
1988–89	I liga	8	29	22–27	
1989–90	I liga	16	13	19–45	Relegation
1990–91	II liga	3	48	46–29	
1991–92	II liga (eastern group)	2	43	53–28	Promotion
1992–93	I liga	18	9	28–91	Relegation
1993–94	II liga (eastern group)	10	32	40–39	
1994–95	II liga (eastern group)	12	33	41–39	
1995–96	II liga (eastern group)	15	40	35–54	Relegation
1996–97	III liga	6	48	41–32	
1997–98	III liga	8	62	55–25	Relegation
1998–99	IV liga	4	62	73–39	
1999–2000	IV liga	2	81	124–11	Promotion
2000–01	III liga (group 1)	2	83	74–26	Promotion
2001–02	II liga	15	45	41–41	Relegation
2002–03	III liga (group 1)	1	67	55–18	Promotion
2003–04	II liga	9	37	35–42	
2004–05	II liga	6	54	45–29	
2005–06	II liga	3	56	48:30	Took part in promotion play-offs
2006–07	II liga	2	63	49–28	Promotion
2007–08	Ekstraklasa	14	27	27–57	
2008–09	Ekstraklasa	8	34	28–34	
2009–10	Ekstraklasa	11	34	29–27	Polish Cup winners
2010–11	Ekstraklasa	4	48	38–32	Polish Super Cup winners
2011–12	Ekstraklasa	10	39	35–45	
2012–13	Ekstraklasa	10	37	31–45	
2013–14	Ekstraklasa	11	29 (39)	59–58	
2014–15	Ekstraklasa	3	41 (49)	59–44	
2015–16	Ekstraklasa	11	28 (35)	46–62	
2016–17	Ekstraklasa	2	42 (59)	64–39	
2017–18	Ekstraklasa	2	67 (54)	55–41	
2018–19	Ekstraklasa	5	57 (47)	55–52	
2019–20	Ekstraklasa	8	52 (44)	47–50	
2020–21	Ekstraklasa	9	37	39–48	
2021–22	Ekstraklasa	12	40	39–50	
2022–23	Ekstraklasa	14	41	48–49	
2023–24	Ekstraklasa	1	63	77–45	Champions
2024–25	Ekstraklasa	3	61	56–42	Polish Super Cup winners
2025–26	Ekstraklasa	3	55	56–41	

Legend
Color indication
I league tier
II league tier
III league tier
IV league tier
V league tier

== Match-fixing scandal ==
The questioning of Jagiellonia's involvement in the corruption scandal that went through the Department of Discipline of the Polish Football Association started on 20 June 2008, when the National Prosecutor's office in Wrocław handed over documents related to fixing 6 games in the II Liga during the 2004–05 season. On 26 June 2008, the Department of Discipline postponed the date that would decide the fate of the club. On 10 July, there was another extension to the discipline proceedings against the club so the Department of Discipline could get help from the Minister of Justice to obtain further documents from the National Prosecutor.

On 12 February 2009, Jagiellonia became the 10th club to be penalized for their involvement in the match-fixing scandal. The Department of Discipline of the PZPN imposed a penalty of relegation by one tier in the following season after the judgement became final of five accounts of sports crime. On March 24, 2009 the club launched an appeal against the decision. On 29 April 2009, the court repealed the punishment of relegation, instead handing the club a ten-point deduction for the following season and imposed a fine of 300 thousand złoty.

== Sponsorship ==
Years	Shirt sponsor	Kit Manufacturer
2008–2009	VacansOleil	Joma
2009–2010	Białystok	Joma
2011–2014	EuroCash, Wschodzący Białystok	Under Armour
2015–2017	STAG SA, Wschodzący Białystok	Erreà
2017–2020	STS, Wschodzący Białystok	Erreà
2020–2022	STS, Wschodzący Białystok	Kappa
2022–2023	Cyber Quant, Kuchnia Wikinga, Wschodzący Białystok	Kappa
2023–2024	Enea, Kuchnia Wikinga, Wschodzący Białystok	Kappa
2024–2025	Chorten, Kuchnia Wikinga, Wschodzący Białystok	Kappa
2025–	Superbet, Kuchnia Wikinga, Wschodzący Białystok	Kappa

== See also ==
- Jagiellonia Białystok II (reserve team)
- Football in Poland
- List of football teams
