= Dariusz Bayer =

Polish retired footballer

Personal information
- Date of birth: 17 September 1964 (age 62)
- Place of birth: Białystok, Poland
- Height: 1.70 m (5 ft 7 in)
- Positions: Defender; midfielder

Senior career*
Years	Team	Apps	(Gls)
–1983	Jagiellonia Białystok		
1983–85	ŁKS Łódź		
1985–1989	Jagiellonia Białystok	54+	(0+)
1989–1991	Lech Poznań	57	(3)
1991–1992	US Orléans	25	(0)
1992	Valenciennes FC	2	(0)
1992–1993	Annecy FC	31	(3)
1993–1994	Legia Warsaw	8	(0)
1994–1995	Hetman Zamość		
1995–1996	Jagiellonia Białystok		
1996–1998	Hetman Białystok		
1998–1999	Ursus Warsaw		
1999–2000	Ruch Wysokie Mazowieckie		
2000–2001	Sparta Szepietowo		

Managerial career
- 2001–2003: Supraślanka Supraśl
- 2003–2005: MOSP Jagiellonia Białystok
- 2007–2008: Jagiellonia Białystok (youth)
- 2007–2008: Sokół Sokółka
- 2010: Jagiellonia Białystok (ME)
- 2013–2017: Jagiellonia Białystok II
- * Club domestic league appearances and goals

Dariusz Bayer (born 17 September 1964) is a Polish professional football manager and former player.

== Honours ==
Jagiellonia Białystok

- II liga, group II: 1986–87

Lech Poznań

- Ekstraklasa: 1989–90
- Polish Super Cup: 1990

Legia Warsaw

- Ekstraklasa: 1993–94
- Polish Cup: 1993–94
