= Hetman Białystok =

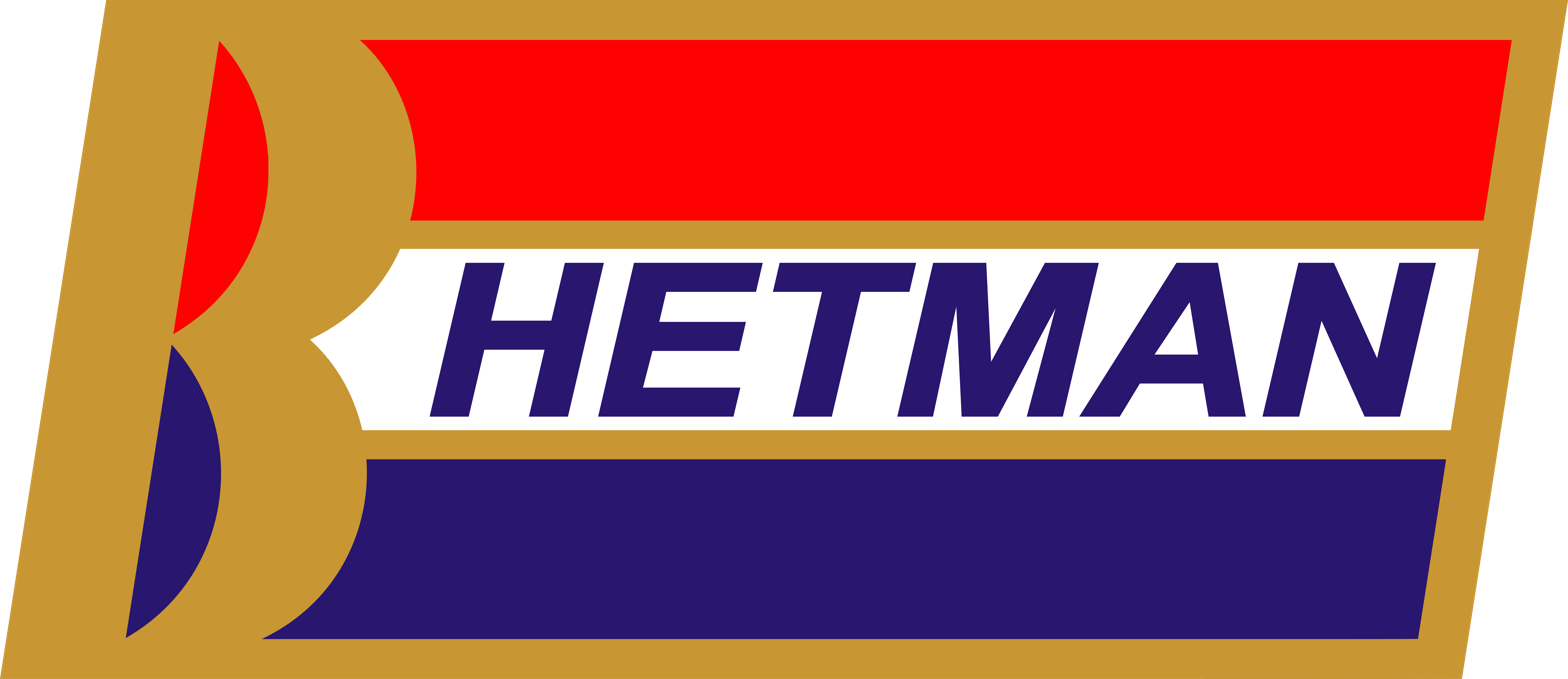
- Full name: Białostocki Klub Sportowy Hetman Białystok
- Founded: 1948; 78 years ago
- Chairman: Marcin Maciejewski
- Manager: Jacek Bayer
- League: Klasa A Podlaskie II
- 2023–24: Klasa A Podlaskie II, 9th of 10
- Website: http://www.hetman.bialystok.pl/
Home colours	Away colours

Hetman Białystok, formerly Gwardia Białystok, is a Polish sports club based in Białystok. The football departments currently plays in the second group of Klasa A Podlaskie.

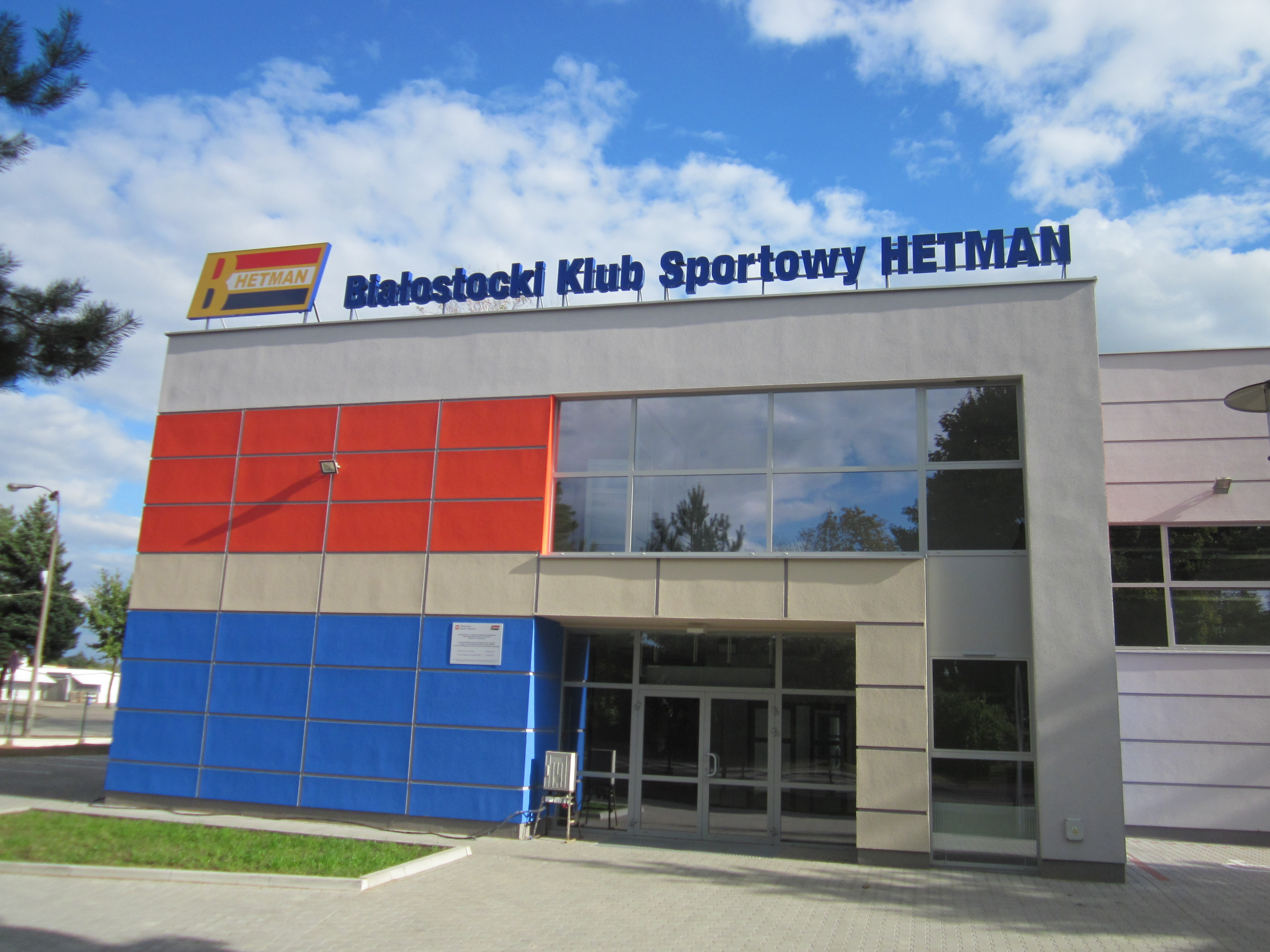
Club headquarters

== History ==
Gwardia was organized in 1948 as a Polish Milicja Obywatelska (Communist Police) club. The name Gwardia used to be a common name for any Citizens' Militia's sports' club in Poland. Many players were soldiers serving in the Polish People's Army who were assigned to the units in or near Białystok City.

Gwardia was the first team from Białystok after World War II to advance to the second tier, but survived there only one season (1951–52) before being relegated to the third division.

With the End of communism in Poland and the cessation of sponsorship, the club was forced to temporarily disappear in 1990.

The club was reactivated soon after when it changed its name from Gwardia to Hetman. The club also added three other sections: amateur boxing, judo, and contract bridge.

== Honours ==
- III liga, group II: 1953
- Polish Cup (Białystok regionals): 1952–53, 1953–54, 1954–55, 1955–56, 1960–61, 1978–79, 1981–82, 1985–86, 1986–87, 1993–94

== Current squad ==
As of 19 May 2013

Note: Flags indicate national team as defined under FIFA eligibility rules; some limited exceptions apply. Players may hold more than one non-FIFA nationality.

No.	Pos.	Nation	Player
—	GK	POL	Kamil Stepanczenko
—	GK	POL	Rafał Topczewski
—	GK	POL	Łukasz Łopatowicz
—	DF	POL	Jacek Malaszewski
—	DF	POL	Piotr Jarocki
—	DF	POL	Karol Sobota
—	DF	POL	Radosław Nowiński
—	DF	POL	Marcin Bochenek
—	DF	POL	Bartosz Gliński

No.	Pos.	Nation	Player
—	MF	POL	Paweł Seweryn
—	MF	POL	Daniel Sienkiewicz
—	MF	POL	Kamil Żyliński
—	MF	POL	Łukasz Suchowolec
—	MF	POL	Norbert Wiński
—	MF	POL	Mateusz Sawicki
—	MF	POL	Jakub Czaczkowski
—	FW	POL	Adam Hillo
—	FW	POL	Jakub Budźko

== Other departments ==
The club also has a section of boxing, judo and duplicate bridge.

== Notable boxers ==
- Paweł Głażewski
- Grzegorz Kiełsa
- Andrzej Liczik
- Łukasz Maszczyk
- Kamil Szeremeta
- Krzysztof Zimnoch
