= Krzysztof Gawara =

Polish footballer

Personal information
- Date of birth: 15 March 1958 (age 68)
- Place of birth: Sienno, Poland
- Height: 1.85 m (6 ft 1 in)
- Position: Defender

Senior career*
Years	Team	Apps	(Gls)
–1977	Polonia Bydgoszcz		
1977–1979	Lechia Gdańsk		
1979–1979	Zawisza Bydgoszcz		
1979–1983	Lechia Gdańsk		
1983–1985	Ruch Chorzów	61	(1)
1985–1988	Legia Warsaw	70	(1)
1988–1989	Polonia Sydney		
1989–1990	Ruch Chorzów		
1991–1993	FF Jaro	50	(1)
1994–1995	Tampereen Pallo-Veikot	62	(1)
1995–1996	EuPa Eura		

Managerial career
- 1997–1998: Wicher Kobyłka
- 1998–2001: Legia Warsaw II
- 2001: Legia Warsaw (caretaker)
- 2001: Legia Warsaw (assistant)
- 2001–2003: Legia Warsaw II
- 2003–2004: Legia Warsaw (assistant)
- 2004: Legia Warsaw (caretaker)
- 2004–2005: Legia Warsaw (assistant)
- 2005–2006: Legia Warsaw II
- 2006–2011: Huragan Wołomin
- * Club domestic league appearances and goals

Krzysztof Stanisław Gawara (born 15 March 1958) is a Polish former football manager and player who played as a defender.

== Playing career ==
The first years of his career were spent in Bydgoszcz and Gdańsk, where Gawara graduated from Polonia Bydgoszcz, before playing for Zawisza Bydgoszcz and Lechia Gdańsk. In 1983, he joined Ruch Chorzów, with whom he made his Ekstraklasa debut. After several seasons spent in Silesia, he moved to Legia Warsaw. Since 1988, he has played abroad, first in the Polonia Club of Sydney, then for Finnish sides FF Jaro and Tampereen Pallo-Veikot, where in 1994 he won the league title in 1994, before finishing his career at EuPa Eura.

== Coaching career ==
After returning from Finland, he began working as a coach. He was first in charge of Wicher Kobyłka, before returning to Legia. He spent the next few years switching between the senior and reserve teams' technical staffs. After Franciszek Smuda was dismissed in March 2001, Gawara was appointed temporary manager of Legia, after which he became assistant under Dragan Okuka. After two more years in charge of Legia's second team, he joined Dariusz Kubicki's staff at the senior technical staff as the assistant. After Kubicki resigned in the autumn of 2004, he became part of a temporary trio of trainers, alongside Lucjan Brychczy and Jacek Zieliński. Shortly after, after the latter was appointed on permanent basis, Gawara became his assistant. In the summer of 2006, Gawara left Legia to manage Huragan Wołomin.

== Honours ==
Tampereen Pallo-Veikot

- Veikkausliiga: 1994
