= Dariusz Wdowczyk =

Polish footballer and manager

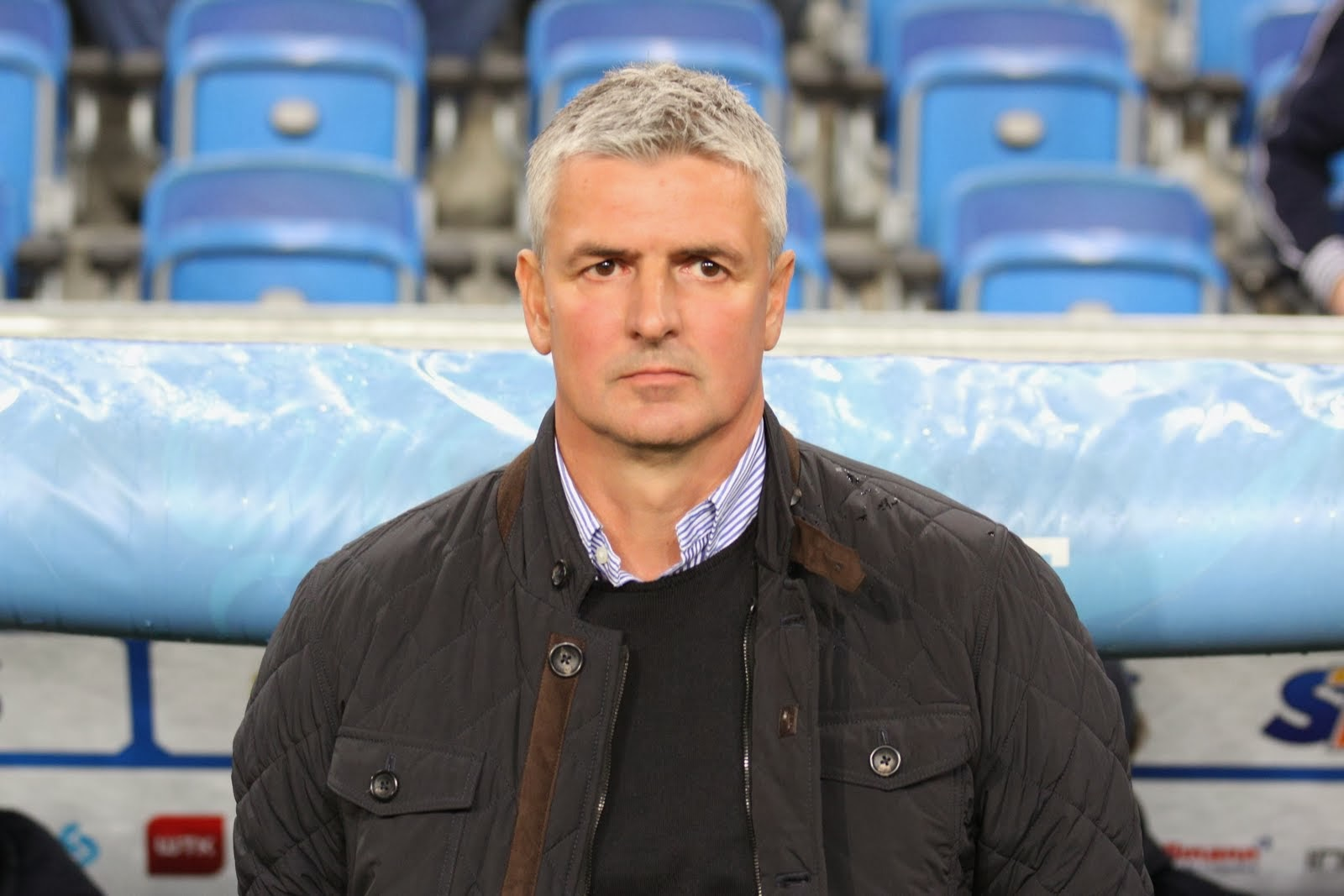

Personal information
- Full name: Dariusz Wdowczyk
- Date of birth: 25 September 1962 (age 64)
- Place of birth: Warsaw, Poland
- Height: 1.79 m (5 ft 10 in)
- Position: Left-back

Senior career*
Years	Team	Apps	(Gls)
1979–1983	Gwardia Warsaw	71	(1)
1983–1989	Legia Warsaw	206	(17)
1989–1994	Celtic	116	(4)
1994–1998	Reading	82	(0)
1998	Polonia Warsaw	5	(0)

International career
- Poland U18
1984–1992	Poland	53	(2)

Managerial career
- 1998–2000: Polonia Warsaw
- 2000–2001: Wisła Płock
- 2001–2002: Widzew Łódź
- 2002–2004: Korona Kielce
- 2005–2007: Legia Warsaw
- 2007–2008: Polonia Warsaw
- 2013–2014: Pogoń Szczecin
- 2016: Wisła Kraków
- 2017: Piast Gliwice
Medal record
Men's football
Representing Poland
UEFA European Under-18 Championship
Runner-up	1980 East Germany
Runner-up	1981 West Germany
- * Club domestic league appearances and goals

Dariusz Wdowczyk (born 25 September 1962) is a Polish former professional football manager and player. He played for Gwardia Warsaw, Legia Warsaw, Celtic, Reading, and Polonia Warsaw. He has subsequently carved out a career in football management.

On 13 April 2007, he was replaced as manager of Legia Warsaw by Jacek Zieliński, following a run of bad results.

He joined Livingston as their new sporting director on 28 June 2007, to assist new manager Mark Proctor, his main objective was to investigate the foreign market, in particular the Eastern European market. It was announced on 30 October 2007 that Wdowczyk was to leave Livingston to embark on a second spell as manager of Polonia Warsaw.

In 2008, he was convicted for his involvement in the 2003–2005 match-fixing scandal, and received a seven-year ban from the Polish Football Association Disciplinary Committee, which was later reduced to four years.

After leaving Piast Gliwice in 2017, Wdowczyk joined Polsat Sport's coverage team as a pundit, and has since stated he had no intention of returning to coaching.

== Career statistics ==
=== International ===
Appearances and goals by national team and year
National team	Year	Apps	Goals
Poland	1984	5	0
Poland	1985	6	0
Poland	1986	3	0
Poland	1987	6	0
Poland	1988	8	0
Poland	1989	13	2
Poland	1990	6	0
Poland	1991	5	0
Poland	1992	1	0
Total		53	2

== Honours ==
=== Player ===
Legia Warsaw

- Polish Cup: 1988–89
- Polish Super Cup: 1989

Poland U18

- UEFA European Under-18 Championship runner-up: 1980, 1981

=== Manager ===
Polonia Warsaw

- Ekstraklasa: 1999–2000
- Polish League Cup: 1999–2000
- Polish Super Cup: 2000

Korona Kielce

- III liga, group IV: 2003–04

Legia Warsaw

- Ekstraklasa: 2005–06
