= Legia Warsaw Museum =

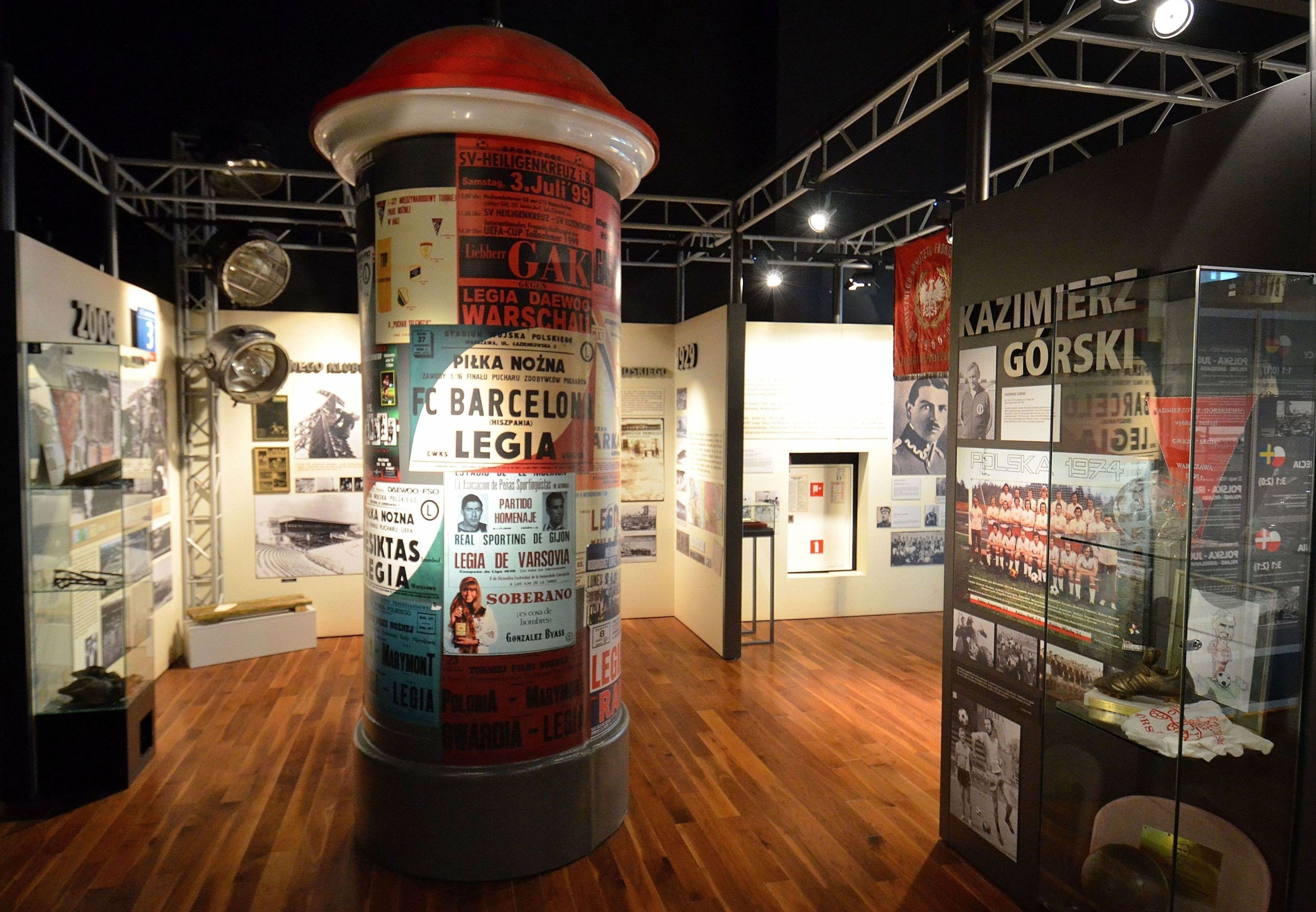
- Legia Warsaw museum opened in 2006
- Established: April 21, 2006
- Location: Polish Army Stadium
- Type: Sports Museum
- Website: Official website (in Polish)

The Legia Warsaw Museum is a museum and stadium tour dedicated to Legia Warsaw club history in Warsaw in Poland. The museum, located at the Polish Army Stadium (3 Łazienki Street), was opened on 21 April 2006 and is open daily for tours.

== History ==
The stadium includes a museum and fan shop section which are open to the public with a tour starting every hour from 11:00–19:00 M-F and weekends 11:00-17:00 CET, taking the visitor to various parts of the stadium, through the locker rooms, and alongside the pitch, to see the club's Wall of Fame. Legia Warsaw Museum is not limited to football only. The Club includes information on many other sports, e.g. boxing, gymnastics, wrestling, motorcycle speedway or fencing, and in the Museum there are pieces of exhibitions connected to them, such as the gold medal won by the wrestler Andrzej Wroński at the Olympic Games in Seoul in 1988.

== Location ==
The museum and tour are situated in the Polish Army Stadium in Warsaw inside the club's home stadium.
