= Mirosław Jabłoński =

Polish football manager

Personal information
- Date of birth: 16 September 1950 (age 76)
- Place of birth: Warsaw, Poland
- Positions: Right-back; midfielder

Youth career
- Legia Warsaw

Senior career*
Years	Team	Apps	(Gls)
- ZWAR Międzylesie
- AZS AWF Biała Podlaska
- AZS AWF Warsaw

Managerial career
- 1985–1989: Gwardia Warsaw
- 1989–1990: Górnik Wałbrzych
- 1990–1994: Poland U16 & Poland U18
- 1992–1993: Polonia Warsaw
- 1994–1995: Polonia Warsaw
- 1995–1997: Legia Warsaw (assistant)
- 1997–1998: Legia Warsaw
- 1998–2001: Zagłębie Lubin
- 2001–2003: Amica Wronki
- 2003–2005: Wisła Płock
- 2006: Zagłębie Lubin (chairman)
- 2007–2008: ŁKS Łódź
- 2008: Wisła Płock
- 2010–2011: Górnik Łęczna
- 2013: Bruk-Bet Termalica Nieciecza
- 2014–2016: Stomil Olsztyn
- 2016–2017: Legionovia Legionowo
- 2020–2021: Mazur Karczew
- * Club domestic league appearances and goals

Mirosław Korneliusz Jabłoński (born 16 September 1950) is a Polish professional football manager and former player.

== Honours ==
Polonia Warsaw

- II liga, group II: 1992–93

Legia Warsaw

- Polish Cup: 1996–97
- Polish Super Cup: 1997
