= Stefan Białas =

Polish footballer and manager

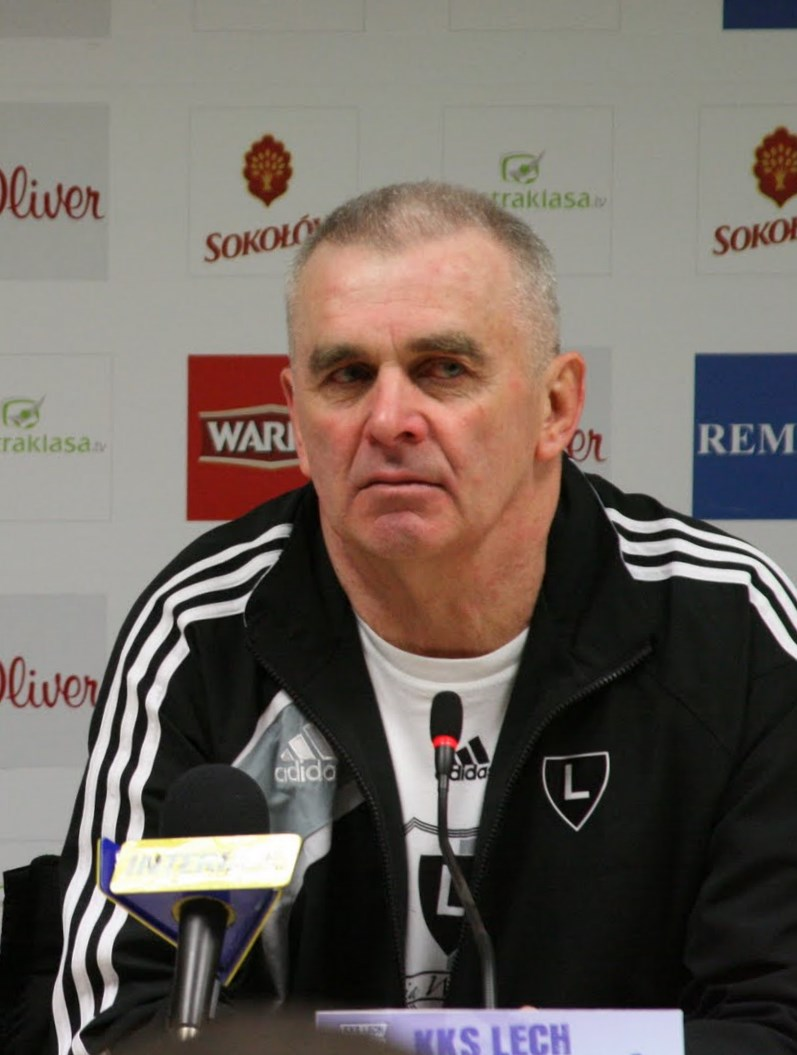

Personal information
- Date of birth: 8 December 1948 (age 77)
- Place of birth: Siemianowice Śląskie, Poland
- Height: 1.81 m (5 ft 11 in)
- Position: Midfielder

Youth career
- 1966: Siemianowiczanka

Senior career*
Years	Team	Apps	(Gls)
1966–1968	Ruch Chorzów		
1968–1972	Śląsk Wrocław		
1972–1977	Legia Warsaw		
1977–1978	Gueugnon		
1978–1980	Besançon		
1980–1981	US Nœux-les-Mines		
1981–1982	Paris FC		
1982–1983	Compiègne		
1983–1985	Creil		

International career
1967	Poland U-18		

Managerial career
- 1981–1981: Paris FC (assistant)
- 1982–1983: Compiègne
- 1983–1986: Creil
- 1985–1986: FC Rouen (assistant)
- 1986–1988: Beauvais
- 1995–1996: Club Olympique des Transports
- 1996–1997: Stade Tunisien
- 1998: Club Olympique des Transports
- 1998: Legia Warsaw (caretaker)
- 1998: Legia Warsaw (assistant)
- 1999: Legia Warsaw
- 1999–2000: Club Olympique des Transports
- 2006: Cracovia
- 2006–2008: Jagiellonia Białystok
- 2010: Legia Warsaw (interim)
- * Club domestic league appearances and goals

Stefan Feliks Bialas (born 8 December 1948) is a Polish former professional football manager and player.

== Career ==
Bialas played for several Polish clubs, including Ruch Chorzów, Legia Warsaw and Śląsk Wrocław. He then moved to France and played for Gueugnon, Besançon, US Nœux-les-Mines, Paris FC and Creil.

He later began a coaching career, first as assistant manager of Paris FC, then with Compiègne, Creil, Beauvais, Club Olympique des Transports and Stade Tunisien, and working briefly as a coach for Cracovia in 2006. On 12 May 2006, Bialas was appointed as the manager of Jagiellonia Białystok. On 7 June 2008, he mutually terminated his contract with the club. On 14 March 2010 he was officially named as the head coach of Legia Warsaw, where he was replaced by Maciej Skorża on 1 June 2010.

Since mid-2000s, he has been providing commentary on Ligue 1 games for Canal+ Sport and Eleven Sports.
