= Edmund Zientara =

Polish footballer

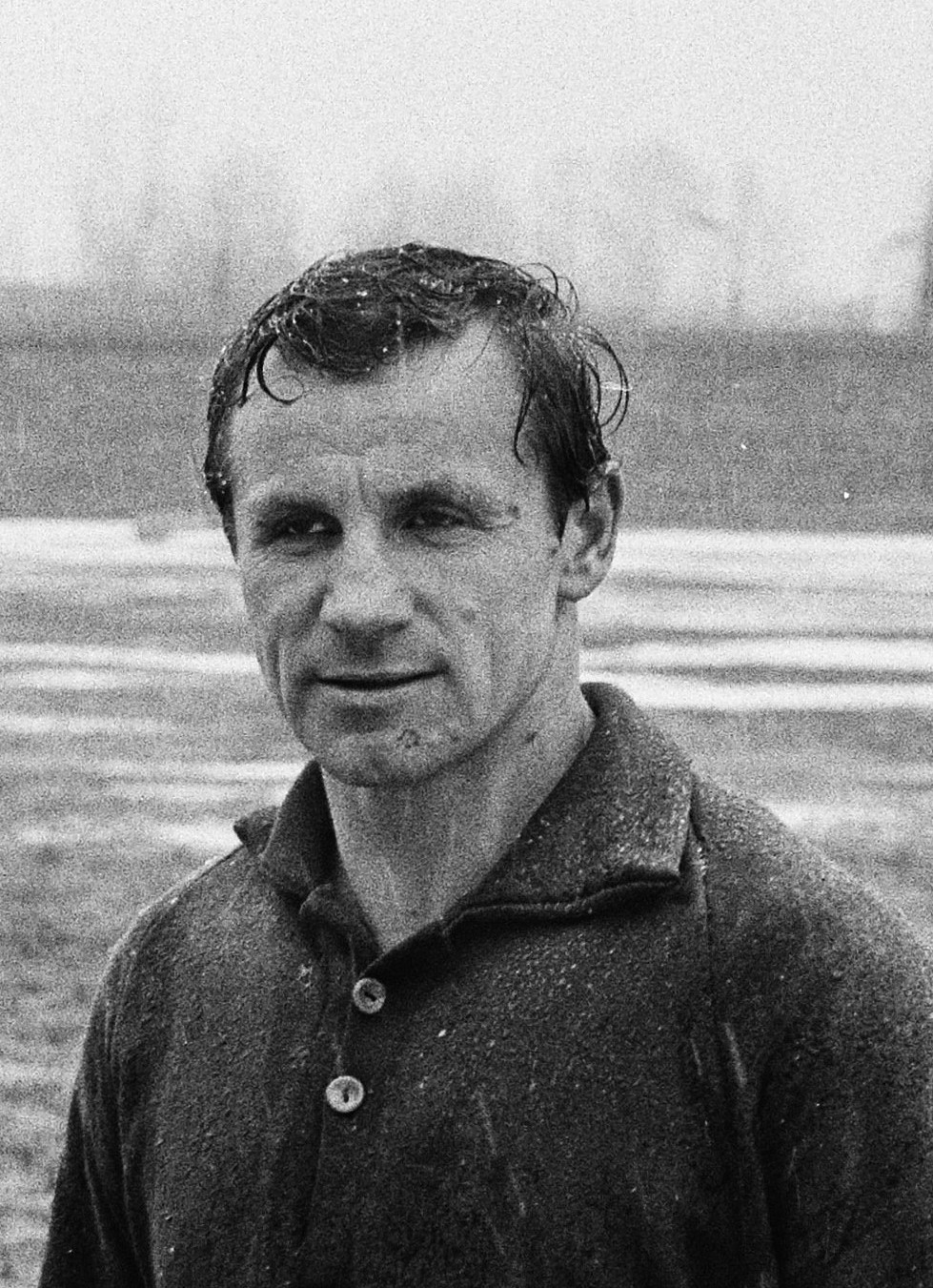
- Zientara in 1970.

Personal information
- Full name: Edmund Jan Zientara
- Date of birth: 25 January 1929
- Place of birth: Warsaw, Poland
- Date of death: 3 August 2010 (aged 81)
- Place of death: Warsaw, Poland
- Position: Midfielder

Senior career*
Years	Team	Apps	(Gls)
1947–1950	Polonia Warsaw		
1950–1952	CWKS Warsaw	22	(0)
1952	OWKS Lublin		
1953–1955	Gwardia Warsaw		
1956–1962	Legia Warsaw	135	(3)
1962–1965	Maribyrnong Polonia		

International career
1950–1961	Poland	40	(1)

Managerial career
- 1969–1971: Legia Warsaw
- 1972–1975: Pogoń Szczecin
- 1975–1977: Stal Mielec
- Pezoporikos
- –1981: AEL Limassol
- 1982–1983: Poland (assistant)
- 1983–1984: Wisła Kraków
- 1984–1987: Poland U21
Medal record
Men's football
Representing Poland (as manager)
UEFA European Under-18 Championship
Third place	1978 Poland
- * Club domestic league appearances and goals

Edmund Jan Zientara (25 January 1929 – 3 August 2010) was a Polish football manager and player who played as a midfielder.

== Career ==
Born in Warsaw, Zientara played for Polonia Warsaw, Kolejarz Warszawa, CWKS Warszawa, OWKS Lublin, Gwardia Warsaw, Legia Warsaw and Maribyrnong Polonia.

He earned 40 caps for the Poland national team between 1950 and 1961. He also represented Poland at the 1960 Summer Olympics, making three appearances in the tournament.

== Honours ==
=== Player ===
Gwardia Warsaw

- Polish Cup: 1953–54

Legia Warsaw

- Ekstraklasa: 1956
- Polish Cup: 1955–56

=== Manager ===
Legia Warsaw

- Ekstraklasa: 1969–70

Stal Mielec

- Ekstraklasa: 1975–76

Poland U18

- UEFA European Under-18 Championship third place: 1978
