= Julian Neuding =

Polish boxer, sports official and referee of Jewish descent

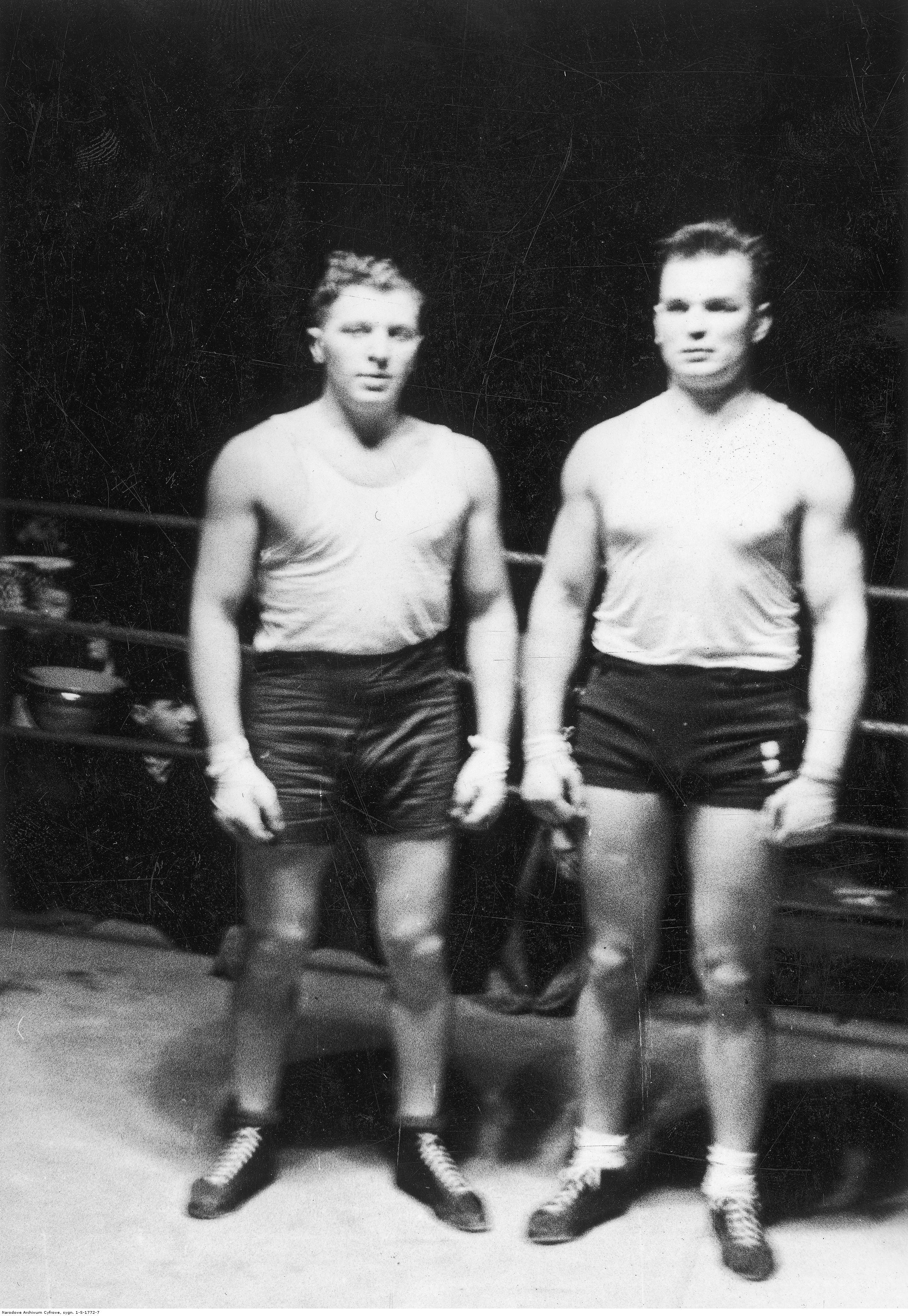
- Boxers Julian Neuding (on the left) and Piotr Mizerski are standing in the ring.

Personal information
- Citizenship: Polish
- Born: 15 December 1916 Warsaw
- Died: 1987 (aged 70–71)

Sport
- Sport: Boxing

Julian Neuding (born 15 December 1916, died 1987) – a Polish boxer, sports official, and referee of Jewish descent.

Before World War II, he boxed for Makabi Warsaw, winning, among other titles, the Warsaw Heavyweight Championship in 1935. In the early post-war years, he was one of the leading figures in Legia Warsaw, contributing to the club's reconstruction (he was, among other roles, the head of the football section). From 1950, he also served as an international boxing referee, officiating at the Summer Olympics in 1952 and 1956. From 1954 to 1956, he led the boxing section at the Main Office of Physical Culture. In 1956, following an organizational reform, he became the president of the Polish Boxing Association.

After 1968 he lived in Germany.
