= Władysław Stachurski =

Polish footballer and manager

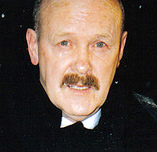

Personal information
- Date of birth: 27 March 1945
- Place of birth: Piotrkowice, Poland
- Date of death: 13 March 2013 (aged 67)
- Place of death: Warsaw, Poland
- Height: 1.80 m (5 ft 11 in)
- Position: Defender

Senior career*
Years	Team	Apps	(Gls)
1957–1959	Skra Warsaw		
1959–1961	SHL Kielce		
1961–1964	Sarmata Warsaw		
1964	→ KS Warszawianka (loan)		
1964–1973	Legia Warsaw	115	(11)

International career
1969–1970	Poland	8	(1)

Managerial career
- 1979–1981: Legia Warsaw (assistant)
- 1981–1983: Poland (youth)
- 1987: Legia Warsaw (assistant)
- 1988–1990: Zawisza Bydgoszcz
- 1990–1991: Legia Warsaw
- 1991–1992: Sharjah FC
- 1993–1995: Widzew Łódź
- 1995: Al-Masry Port Said
- 1995–1996: Poland
- 1996–1997: Legia Warsaw
- 2002–2003: Okęcie Warsaw
- 2003–2004: Świt Nowy Dwór Mazowiecki
- 2005: GLKS Nadarzyn
- * Club domestic league appearances and goals

Władysław Stachurski (27 March 1945 – 13 March 2013) was a Polish professional football player and manager.

As a player, he was best known for his time at Legia Warsaw and was capped eight times for Poland, scoring one goal. He retired aged 28 due to a career ending injury.

He made his name as a manager, most notably with Zawisza Bydgoszcz, Legia Warsaw, Widzew Łódź, Poland and Świt Nowy Dwór Mazowiecki.

== Honours ==
=== Player ===
Legia Warsaw

- Ekstraklasa: 1968–69, 1969–70
- Polish Cup: 1965–66
