= Legia Warsaw =

Polish association football club

- Full name: Legia Warszawa Spółka Akcyjna
- Nicknames: Wojskowi (The Militarians); Legioniści (The Legionaries)
- Founded: 14 March 1916; 110 years ago as Drużyna Sportowa Legia (Sport Team Legia)
- Stadium: Polish Army Stadium
- Capacity: 31,103
- Owner(s): Dariusz Mioduski (60%); Michael Gorzynski (40%)
- President: Dariusz Mioduski
- Head coach: Marek Papszun
- League: Ekstraklasa
- 2025–26: Ekstraklasa, 6th of 18
- Website: legia.com
Home colours	Away colours

Legia Warszawa (Polish: [ˈlɛɡʲja varˈʂava]), commonly referred to as Legia Warsaw or simply Legia, is a professional football club based in Warsaw, Poland. Legia is the most successful Polish football club in history, winning a record 15 Ekstraklasa champions titles, a record 21 Polish Cup and 6 Polish Super Cup trophies. The club's home venue is the Polish Army Stadium (Stadion Wojska Polskiego). Legia is the only Polish club never to have been relegated from the top flight of Polish football since World War II (see: 1936 Legia Warsaw season).

Legia was formed between 5 and 15 March 1916 during military operations in World War I, as the main football club of the Polish Legions. After the war, the club was reactivated on 14 March 1920 in an officer casino in Warsaw as Wojskowy Klub Sportowy Warszawa, renamed Legia in 1923 after merger with another local club, Korona. It became the main official football club of the Polish Army – Wojskowy Klub Sportowy Legia Warszawa (lit. 'Military Sports Club Legia Warsaw'). From 1949 to 1957, Legia was known as CWKS Warszawa (lit. 'Central Military Sports Club Warsaw')

Before 8 April 2004, it was owned by Pol-Mot and from 8 April 2004 (sold for 3 million zlotys) until 9 January 2014, it was owned by media conglomerate ITI Group. The club is currently owned by Dariusz Mioduski who serves as the club's chairman.

== Names ==
Years	Name
1916–1918	Drużyna Sportowa Legia
1920–1922	WKS Warszawa
1922–1945	WKS Legia Warszawa
1945	I WKS Warszawa
1945–1949	I WKS Legia Warszawa
1949–1957	CWKS Warszawa
1957–1970s	WKS Legia Warszawa
1970s–1989	CWKS Legia Warszawa
1989–1997	ASPN CWKS Legia Warszawa
1997	ASPN CWKS Legia-Daewoo Warszawa
1997–2001	SSA ASPN CWKS Legia-Daewoo Warszawa
2001–2003	SSA ASPN CWKS Legia Warszawa
2003–2012	Klub Piłkarski Legia Warszawa Sportowa Spółka Akcyjna
2012–	Legia Warszawa Spółka Akcyjna

== History ==
=== Formation and beginnings ===
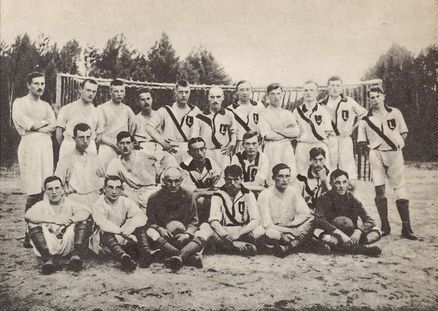
Legia and the Division of Sanitary team after a 7–0 win by Legia. Spring 1916

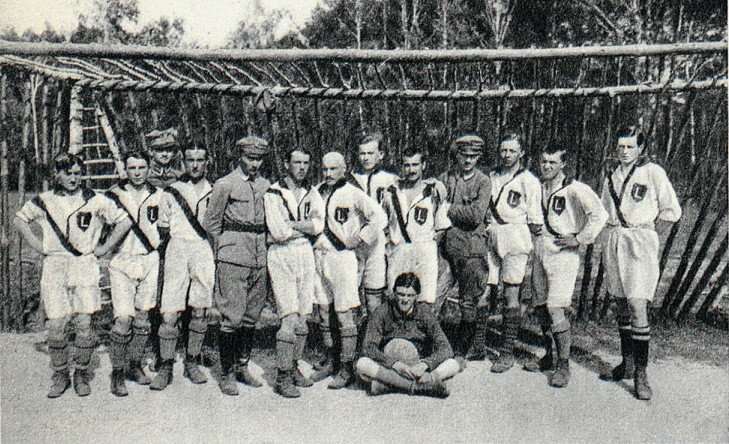
Legia in 1916

Legia was formed between 5 and 15 March 1916 during military operations in World War I on the Eastern Front in the village of Kostiuchnówka, within the region of Volhynia (Polish: Wołyń). It served as the main football club of the Polish Legions, who at the time fought for Austria-Hungary. The formation of the club in 1916 was greatly influenced by the outbreak of the First World War, because many Polish soldiers were involved in the formation of the Polish Legions before the war. Soldiers, often young men from the south of Poland (mainly from Kraków and Lwów) played football before the war, and therefore, after the formation of the team, they soon became successful. Football was a good way of spending free time, in the calm moments at the front, football matches were organized, which required the ball, making provisional goals, and finding a dozen or so players.

The first team training began in the spring of 1915 in Piotrków, between 5 and 15 March 1916 – at the request of then Master Sergeant Zygmunt Wasserab (pre-war player of Pogoń Stryj) – who was a part of the Polish Legion's Commanding Staff in Kostiuchnówka in Volhynia to create a football club. The president of the organization was Władysław Groele, and corporal Stanisław Mielech proposed the name "Sporting Team Legia", which was adopted (more commonly used term of the team later became Legionowa). Other names were: "Legion Command Squad" and "Styr". White-black colors and arms were also shown, showing the white letter "L" (symbol of the Legions) on the black dial. The players were dressed in white clothes with sloping black belts, which was a reference to Czarni Lwów.

In the spring of 1916, the team played a number of matches with other teams, most of which ended with Legia victorious. The oldest recorded matches are: 7–0 with the Divisional Sanitary Division, 3–3 with the 6th Infantry Regiment and two victories (6–4 and 3–1) with the 4th Infantry Regiment. In July 1916 – because of the Brusilov Offensive – the Legions began to retreat west and the club relocated to Warsaw. The first match in which Polonia Warsaw was the rival was held on 29 April 1917 at Agrykola Park and ended with a 1–1 draw. Of the nine games played in Warsaw, Legia won six and drew three. At the first away game the team won a 2–1 victory over the then Polish champion KS Cracovia in Kraków, so Legia became an unofficial champion of the country. In 1918 the war ended, but the team continued to play only amateur-friendly matches.

=== 1920s and 1930s ===
The club was reactivated on 14 March 1920. In the officers' casinos in the Royal Castle, a group of former officers formed the Military Sports Club (WKS) -Wojskowy Klub Sportowy- Warsaw, establishing the white and red colors of the statute. Among them was Zygmunt Wasserab, one of the founders of the club.

Due to the Polish-Bolshevik war and the participation of many Warsaw players, WKS was not nominated for the premiership of the Polish championship league in 1920. In the 1921–1926 seasons, the team was not promoted beyond the A-class of the Warsaw district, but it was a very important period for the club. In 1922, a statute was passed allowing the team to play in civilian teams (as opposed to playing against only other soldiers). Zygmunt Wassarab and Jerzy Misiński worked together and the club's name was changed to the Military Sports Club "Legia" Warsaw. It was modeled on the document of Pogoń Lwów. At that time, a merger with the oldest Warsaw sports club, Korona, was created, which resulted in the acquisition of new, white-green club colors.

In the first international match played on 18 May 1922, Legia lost 2–9 at their own stadium with Czechoslovak club FK Viktoria Žižkov. A year later, in the championship of Warsaw, the Army took 3rd place.

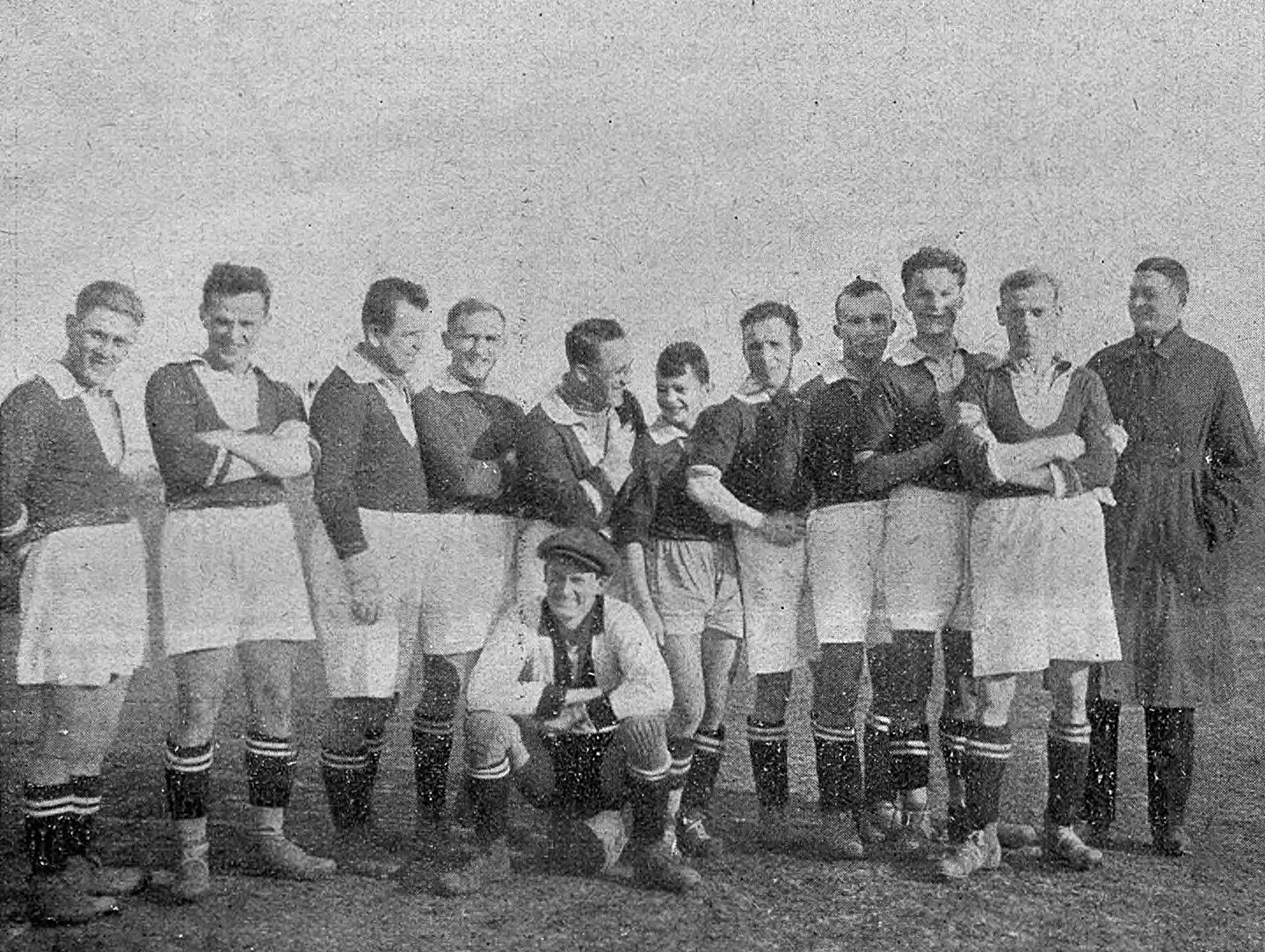
Legia Warsaw in 1925

After the first-ever promotion beyond Class A in 1927, Legia qualified for the newly formed Polish Football League. Roman Górecki, the then president of the Warsaw team, became the first president of the Polish League. Their debut was on 8 May in Łódź – Klub Turystów Łódź was the opponent and the match ended in a 6–1 result. At the same time, Legia player Marian Łańko scored his first league goal free kick and recorded his first hat-trick in club history. In the same year, in a match against Pogonia Lwów, the club suffered the highest league loss, losing 2–11. At the end of the season, Legia finished fifth, despite five defeats at the start of the season. Legia striker Marian Łańko finished second scoring 31 goals. The Warsaw club also made their debut in the Polish Cup, winning the match with Pogoń Warsaw 7–0. For the next two seasons Legia occupied higher positions in the league than the other Warsaw clubs: Polonia and Warszawianka.

In 1930, after three years of construction, the Polish Army Stadium was opened at Łazienkowska Street. In the first match of the new stadium, Legia drew 1–1 with Barcelona. In the same year the legionaries defeated Ruch Hajduki Wielkie 7–1 in their 100th match in the league. Legia also had the biggest pre-war successes in the Polish championships in 1930 and 1931, where they were short three points and one point respectively. Moreover, in the first edition of the Ministry of Foreign Affairs awards for the best results in international competition, the Army received a "traveling" trophy.

In the 1935 season, Legia remained in the league, gaining one point advantage over the relegated Cracovia, and then in 1936 – in the club's 20th anniversary – lost seven consecutive games and recorded the only decline of the league in its history. In 1937 the club's board decided to return to the military statute. As a result, almost all civilians departed from the first team, mainly to other Warsaw teams. In 1937 – in the A class of the Warsaw district – Legia took fourth place, and one year later, took first place, and played in the first division play-offs. Legia was third place in the play-offs and they were not able to advance. The board reacted by withdrawing the club from all competitions and decided to play only friendly matches. In 1938, most of the team's sections were dissolved, leaving only three: tennis, swimming and motocross.

=== 1940s ===
After the end of World War II – in April 1945 – the club was reactivated under the name of I Wojskowy Klub Sportowy Warszawa (1st Military Sports Club Warsaw), and in June added a historical member of Legia. Among the people who contributed to the reconstruction of the club were: Julian Neuding – prewar player of Makabi Warszawa, Karol Rudolf – prewar player of Legia, Henryk Czarnik and Józef Ziemian – Legia players from the interwar period. The team initially played friendly matches with teams in the region, but later also with clubs from other countries, the likes of the Swedish IFK Norrköping and the Yugoslav FK Partizan.

In the first postwar Polish championships held in 1946, Legia took second place in the elimination group, falling out of competition. In 1948, after qualifying for the nine-year break of the highest tier, Legia qualified after a victory in the inter-regional eliminations of the northeastern region and after took second place in the nationwide qualification. Legia eventually took fourth place, drawing 3–3 with Ruch Chorzów. It was the 250th league game of the club. The first post-war match in the first tier took place on 14 March 1948, beating Polonia Bytom 3–1.

For the next two seasons, Legia only held on in the first division due to a better goal differential against the relegated teams, taking the 9th and 10th respectively. In November 1949, after the reforms introduced by the then Polish football association, the club once again changed its name to Centralny Wojskowy Klub Sportowy (Central Army Sports Club). Also, a new coat of arms (large letter C, and smaller letters in it: W, K, S). The official patron of the team was the Polish People's Army. Legia became a military club, so it was possible to get players of other clubs, players like Lucjan Brychczy, Ernest Pohl and Edmund Kowal all were brought to Legia.

=== 1950s ===
In 1951, Legia took third place in the league, and in the cup competitions lost in the eighth-finals with Polonia Warszawa. A year later, Legia achieved its first success in the Polish Cup competition, reaching the finals (in which Polonia Warszawa won 1–0). The reserve team reached this stage of the competition, while the first team dropped out in the eighth-finals, losing to Lechia Gdańsk. In the league, the club ranked sixth, and in the Puchar Zlotu Młodych Przodowników (the premiere edition of the League Cup) was eliminated in the group stage. In 1953, Legia took 5th place in the first league, and in the next season – in addition to the 7th place – the team managed to reach the semi-final of the Polish Cup, in which Gwardia Warsaw won 2–1.

Legia won their first trophy on 29 September 1955, defeating Lechia Gdańsk 5–0 in the Polish Cup final. A month later – on 20 November after a 1–1 draw with Zagłębie in Sosnowiec – the club won their first Polish championship. The team trained by the Hungarian coach János Steiner won their first doublet in the history of Polish football. In the following season, Ryszard Koncewicz became the Legia coach. The club celebrated its 40th anniversary and repeated the achievements from the previous year. First he sealed the Polish championship after a 2–2 draw with ŁKS Lodz, and then he defeated in the cup final Górnik Zabrze in a 3–0 win. These successes were accomplished by strengthening the team by means of conscription to the army of players from such clubs as: Polonia Bytom, Ruch Chorzów, or Wawel Kraków. The latter, like most of the then Okręgowych Wojskowych Klubów Sportowych (District Military Sports Clubs, OWKS), was dissolved. Officially due to the "reorganization of the military division", in practice this meant strengthening CWKS Warszawa (Legia's name at the time). The team then won its highest victory in history, defeating Wisła Kraków 12–0 – the match took place on 19 August 1956 in Warsaw. In addition, the first three places in the goal classification at the end of the season were taken by legionnaires, and the title of the king of scorers was won by the Henryk Kempny who scored 21 goals.

In 1956, in addition to winning the national doublet, Legia made their debut in European competition, competing in the round of 16 of the European Champions Cup with Czechoslovak champions Slovan Bratislava. In the first away meeting, the team lost 0–4, and in the second leg at home they won 2–0 after goals from Kowal and Brychcz, but they were eliminated from further games. The meeting in Warsaw was watched by 40,000 fans.

At the meeting on 2 July 1957 – chaired by Colonel Edward Potorejko – the club's statute was approved and the first 31-member board of WKS Legia was elected, from which an 11-person presidium was then selected. The legal nature of the club has also changed. From the previous military unit, which was CWKS, a sports association was established with legal personality. The name of the club was also changed, as the historical name Legia was returned (Military Sports Club "Legia" Warsaw). In addition, new colors that are still used today were approved: white-red-green-black (later the order of the first two colors were changed) and the current coat of arms was adopted until today (with intervals).

Legia players (appearing as a Warsaw team) were invited to Spain to play the first match on the new FC Barcelona stadium, Camp Nou on 24 September. The match ended with a 4–2 result for the hosts. They struggled in the league that season, finishing in fourth place, and were knocked out of the Polish Cup at the eighth-finals, losing to Ruch Chorzow 1–2 (in that period, until 1961, the I liga season was played from March to August). In 1958, Legia took 6th place in the Polish championship, and in 1959 took 4th.

=== 1960s ===
In the 1960s, Legia regularly held top positions in the league table. In 1960, artificial lighting was installed at the Polish Army Stadium, thanks to which the facility became the second in Poland where matches could be played after dark. The first meeting without natural light was played on 5 October with Danish club Aarhus Gymnastikforening as part of the qualification for the European Club Champions Cup. Legia won the match 1–0 after Helmut Nowak's goal. However, with a 0–3 defeat in the first match in Denmark, they dropped out of further games. In the same season, Tadeusz Błażejewski, in the 11th minute of a 2–2 draw against ŁKS Łódź, scored the thousandth league goal for Legia. The club celebrated another anniversary on 26 October 1960, playing the five-hundredth match in the premier league; Legia beat Zagłębie Sosnowiec 1–0. In the league table Legia took second place, winning the title of runner-up of Poland and losing to Ruch Chorzów by 1 point. The following season, the team won the bronze medal of the Polish championship for taking third place in the league.

In the following year, the league shifted from the spring-fall system to fall-spring, which meant that the league matches started in the spring of 1962. The league was divided into two groups, in which the teams from the same regions played with each other. Legia – which took third place in its group – won the competition for 5th place with Wisła Kraków, drew a 1–1 away match and won 4–1 at home. In the Polish Cup, the team dropped out in the eighth-finals, losing 0–3 with Odra Opole. In the 1962–1963 season with the new league system, the team took the 7th place, and the fight for the Polish Cup again ended at stage eighth-finals (losing to later winner, Zagłębie Sosnowiec, 0–2).

Legia ended the 1963–64 season in fourth place in the league, scoring the same number of goals as second place Zagłębie Sosnowiec and third place Odra Opole. The goal differential decided who took which place. The club achieved a much better result in the Polish Cup, where the team, led by the Romanian coach Virgil Popescu, reached the finals. In the match, played at the 10th-Anniversary Stadium, Legia won after extra time with Polonia Bytom 2–1. Henryk Apostel scored both goals for Legia. In the next season Legia again took 4th place in the league, and in the Polish Cup reached the semi-final, in which they lost after extra time 1–2 with Górnik Zabrze (who became the winner of the cup). The team also competed in the UEFA Cup Winners' Cup. In the first round, Legia eliminated the Austrian FC Admira Wacker Mödling. In the second they defeated the Turkish Galatasaray SK. After two matches there was a draw and third (the decisive step in the advancement) meeting in Bucharest. Legia won 1–0 and were the first Polish team to advance to the quarterfinals of any European club competition. At this stage of the tournament the team lost to German TSV 1860 Munich and was eliminated from the competition.

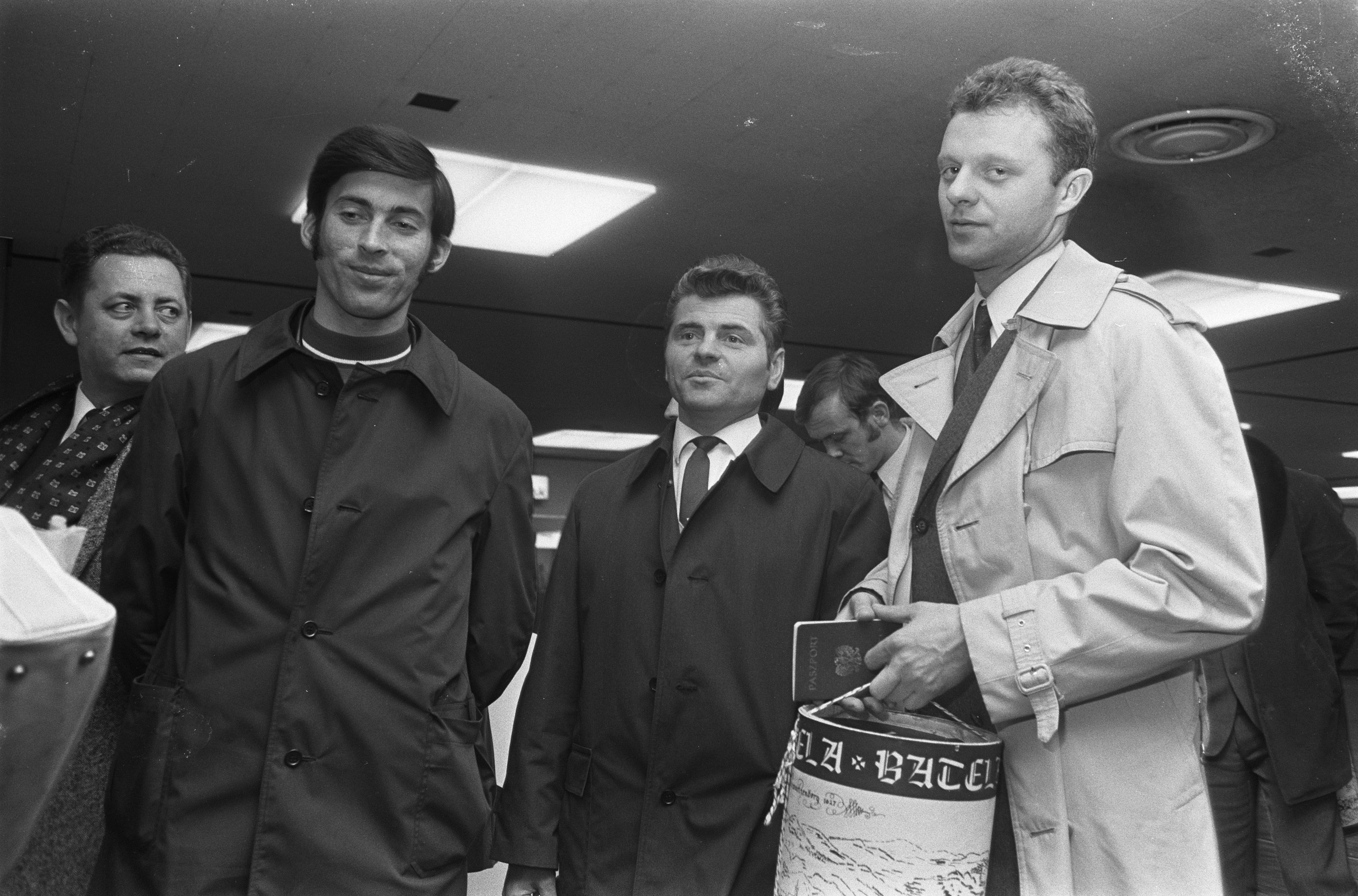
Kazimierz Deyna, Lucjan Brychczy and coach Edmund Zientara

The celebration of the 50th anniversary of the club's existence took place in 1966. In the league the team took 6th place, while a better result was achieved in the twelfth edition of the Polish Cup. In the game played on 15 August at the Warta Poznań stadium, Legia won after extra time in the final, beating Górnik Zabrze 2–1, with Bernard Blaut scoring in the last minute. Winning the Polish Cup allowed the club to compete in the Cup Winners' Cup in the 1966–67 season. In the round of 16, Legia was knocked out by FC Sachsen Leipzig after losing 0–3 away and drawing 2–2 at home. The team came fourth in the league table, and in the Polish Cup was eliminated after a 1–3 defeat in the eighth-finals with Wisła Kraków. That season, Kazimierz Deyna made his debut in the Legia team.

In the 1967–68 season, for the second time in its history, the club was the vice-champion of Poland and was promoted as the first Polish team to the Inter-Cities Fairs Cup. In the Polish Cup Legia was knocked out by GKS Katowice in the eighth-finals. In the same year, the team made their debut in the Intertoto Cup. Legia won their group, but did not advance to the Inter-Cities Fairs Cup because the matches of the Intertoto Cup were not official UEFA competitions. Legia, led by Czechoslovak coach Jaroslav Vejvoda, finished the 1968–69 season in first place in the table, thus winning the third Polish championship. The team reached the final of the Polish Cup, in which they lost to Górnik Zabrze 0–2. The club also made its debut at the Inter-Cities Fairs Cup. In the first round Legia won twice, 6–0 and 3–2 against TSV 1860 Munich. In the next round they won 0–1 and 2–0 against Belgian team Waregem, and the third opponent was Újpest FC. In the next round, the Hungarian team's players were better and Legia were defeated 0–1 away. A 2–2 draw in Warsaw saw their rivals promoted to the next stage. In 1969 there was still one more success – the Legia juniors won the first championship in the history of the club.

The starting line-up of the 1969–70 European Cup semi-final match against Feyenord

For the next season, former player Edmund Zientara was brought in as the new first team coach. His team won the title of Polish champion for the second time in a row. In the struggle for the Polish Cup, Legia was eliminated in the semi-final with Ruch Chorzów. The performances of the club in the European Champion Clubs' Cup was a great success – Legia reached the semi-finals of the competition. In the round of 16, they defeated Romanian club FC UTA Arad 2–1 and 8–0, French club Saint-Étienne in the eighth-finals 2–1 and 1–0, and Turkish club Galatasaray in the quarter-finals 2–1 and 1–0. In the semi-final, they played against Feyenoord. The first match in Warsaw ended in a 0–0 draw, while away the home team triumphed 2–0.

=== 1970s ===
The 1970s were known as Poland's golden age of football. In 1971, Legia were runner's up of Poland for the third time in their history, and ended their Polish Cup campaign in the quarter-finals. For the second year in a row the club competed in the European Club Champions Cup, where it reached the quarter-finals, dropping out against Atlético Madrid (2–1 and 0–1). They previously eliminated IFK Gothenburg (4–0, 2–1) and Standard Liège (0–1, 2–0). From December 1971 to February 1972, Legia went on a tour of Spain and the countries of South America, including Ecuador, Costa Rica and Colombia – this was the first time the team had visited this part of the world. In the 1971–72 season, the team finished third in the league table and lost in the Polish Cup final with Górnik Zabrze 2–5. In September 1972, the Warsaw club defeated Víkingur Reykjavík in the round of 16 European Cup Winners' Cup 9–0, which is the highest Polish team win in European competition. In the next round Legia was matched up against A.C. Milan. The first game was played at the 10th Anniversary Stadium and ended in a 1–1 draw. At the San Siro, after the regular time, the draw was also maintained – Milan scored the winning goal two minutes before the end of extra time to win the game 2–1. In that season, Legia took 8th place in the league and won its fifth Polish Cup – after eliminating Szombinrek in the semi-finals (3–1 and 1–1). In the final match against Polonia, on 17 June 1973 in Poznań, a goalless result was maintained for 90 minutes of regular time of the game, as well as for the entire extra time. The legionaries finally won in penalties, 4–2.

The season of 1973–74 began with a defeat in the round of 16 of the European Club Champions Cup in aggregate with PAOK FC (1–1 in Warsaw, 0–1 in Thessaloniki). In early 1974, the club went to Spain and France to face Barcelona (1–1 at Camp Nou) and RC Lens (0–2). The team finished the league competition in 4th place, and in the Polish Cup they were knocked out in the quarterfinals, losing 1–2 to Stal Rzeszów. Right after the end of the league, the legionnaires went to an international tournament that took place in the Canary Islands – they drew with Cádiz CF, won with CD Tenerife and Hércules CF. Another foreign trip took place at the end of January 1975. Legia flew to Australia and became the first Polish team to visit all continents (except Antarctica). Legia took 6th place in the league, and lost in the round of 16 in the Polish Cup. After the season, the first transfer of Polish player to the West took place, which was allowed by PZPN and the Ministry of Sport. Robert Gadocha was bought by FC Nantes, later French champions.

Legia in the 1975–76 season finished the league in the middle of the table (8th place), and in the Polish Cup reached the eighth-finals, where they lost to GKS Jastrzębie after penalties. In the autumn of 1976, the club's 60th anniversary was celebrated. On the anniversary, 12 October, two matches were played at the Polish Army stadium: a meeting with Legia and Warsaw Polonia (a 2–0 home win) and a match between Legia and Dukla, which ended 4–2 for the legionaries. In February 1977 the team made the next trip, this time to Indonesia. Six games were played at that time (four wins, two draws) and a total of 15 goals were scored – without Deyna, who was at a training camp in Yugoslavia and Greece. Legia also performed for the second time in the Intertoto Cup. Legia's opponents were: Landskrona BoIS (1–0 and 2–1), SK Slavia Prague (1–1 and 2–2) and BSC Young Boys (4–1 and 1–1). Legia took second place in the group and once again was not rewarded with a promotion to the UEFA Cup. The team – finishing in 8th position – repeated the result from the previous league season, while in the Polish Cup they were knocked out in the semi-final, losing to Polonia Bytom 1–2.

During the second half of the 1970s, the legionaries did not make it to the top 3 positions to get into European competitions, and 5th place in the 1977–78 season was their highest position. In addition, the team repeated the result obtained a year earlier in the Polish Cup – Legia reached the semi-final, in which they were knocked out by Zagłębie Sosnowiec after penalties. The next season (1978–79) was the last in which Kazimierz Deyna represented the club. In addition, the club played their 1000th game in the highest football tier – the match took place on 25 April against Lech in Poznań (a 1–2 defeat). The season ended with a 6th-place finish in the league and at the eighth-final stage of the Polish Cup (where they lost against Zagłębie II Lubin 1–2). On 18 September 1979, a farewell to Kazimierz Deyna took place – a friendly with English club Manchester City, who had agreed to his transfer for £100,000. The game ended 2–1 to Legia. Deyna played the whole match and scored two goals – one for Legia (in the first half) and the second for his new club (in the second). The match was very popular and many fans had to watch it from behind the stadium gates.

=== 1980s ===
Legia started the decade by winning the Polish Cup, beating Lech Poznań 5–0 in the final on 9 May 1980. In the league, the legionaries took third place. A year later, the Warsaw club defended the Polish Cup with a 1–0 victory over Pogoń Szczecin on 24 June, but struggled in the league, finishing fifth place. The following season, the team played a match in the quarter-finals of the European Club Champions Cup with Dinamo Tbilisi. During the first meeting in Warsaw, fans, due to the very large number of policemen at the stadium, began to chant the slogans: "Down with communism" and "MO – Gestapo". After being defeated 0–1, the fans organized an anti-communist parade (this situation was repeated several times in the 1980s). The away match also ended 0–1, which was watched by 90 thousand fans in Tbilisi. In the 1981–82 season Legia finished fourth, and in the Polish Cup they were knocked out in the eighth-finals, losing to Arka Gdynia 1–2.

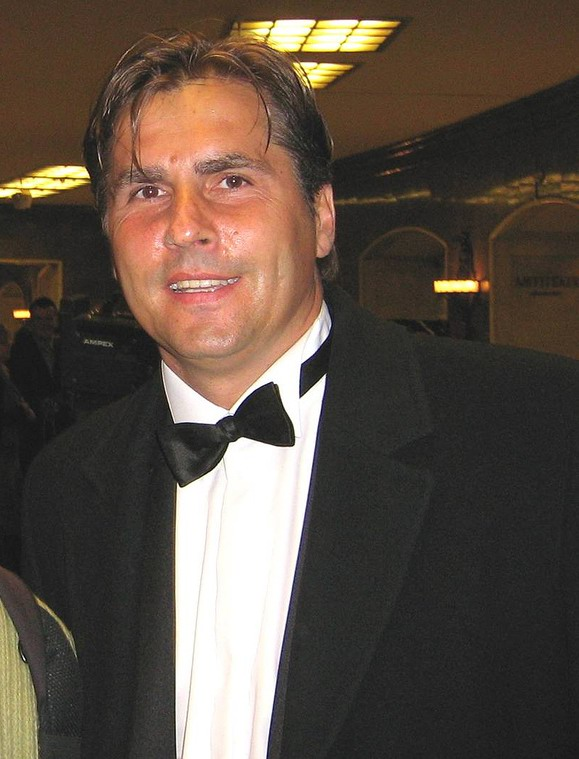
Dariusz Dziekanowski – Ekstraklasa top goalscorer for the 1987–88 season

The 1982–83 season began with a change of part of the team. Legia also gained a new coach, with Kazimierz Górski being replaced by Jerzy Kopa in the middle of the season. Legia finished eighth place in the league table, while in the Polish Cup they fell in the quarterfinals after losing 0–1 against Lech Poznań in Warsaw. A year later, Legia finished fifth in the fight for the title, and in the Polish Cup reached the 5th round, where they lost against Górnik Zabrze 2–3 after extra time.

At the turn of 1984 and 1985, after the autumn round, Legia took first place in the table. They finished runners-up of Poland, which meant the club would participate in the UEFA Cup. In addition, the team reached the quarter-finals of the Polish Cup (a defeat in aggregate with Górnik Zabrze). The following season, 1985–86, the league success was repeated and the quarterfinals of the home cup were again obtained. Both titles went to Górnik Zabrze. In the same years, the legionaries made it to the round of 16 and eighth-finals of the UEFA Cup, losing twice with Inter Milan. In the first match, Milan drew 0–0 at home, which was considered a great success for the Warsaw club. The return match at Łazienkowska ended with the score 0–1 and the Italian team advanced to the next round. The next year in 1986 Legia faced Inter Milan again with a 3–2 win at Łazienkowska and a 0–1 defeat in Italy, which eliminated the Polish club on away goals.

At the beginning of the 1986–87 season, the Warsaw team traveled to China and won the Great Wall Cup, defeating the hosts 2–0. The team played in Beijing and other cities for a week, at the turn of July and August. Following this, apart from other successful performance in Europe, Legia took 5th place in the league and reached the 5th round of knockout (losing against Wisła Kraków after penalties). At the end of 1987, at the Legia stadium, the speedway track was removed and the football field was widened.

Legia finished the next year in the league in third place and reached the Polish Cup final. In Łódź, the legionaries drew 1–1 with Lech and the victory was decided by penalty kicks, which the Poznań team won 3–2. A year later, the Warsaw team took fourth place in the league and won the Polish Cup at the stadium in Olsztyn, beating Jagiellonia Białystok 5–2. Two weeks after the success, they also won the Polish Super Cup for the first time, defeating Ruch Chorzów 3–0 in Zamość.

The trophy gained in Zamość was the first piece of silverware after the reorganization of the club – on 25 April 1989, the club's board decided to separate the football section from the multi-sport section CWKS and establish the Autonomous Football Section (ASPN CWKS "Legia" Warsaw).

On 1 September, long-time footballer and Legia captain, Kazimierz Deyna, died in a car accident in San Diego.

At the end of the decade, on 13 September, Legia competed against FC Barcelona in the first round of the UEFA Cup Winners' Cup. The match in Barcelona ended with a 1–1 draw, after an unrecognized goal for the legionnaires and a penalty kick for the opponents in the 85th minute of the match. In the rematch at Łazienkowska Legia lost 0–1, with 25 thousand fans in the stands. Michael Laudrup scored the only goal.

=== 1990s ===
The beginning of the nineties was not successful for the club, especially in the Polish league. In the 1989–90 season, the team finished in seventh place, and the next season in ninth. The 1991–92 season ended in a 10th-place finish – for the first time since World War II, Legia was fighting relegation to the second league. The team avoided relegation after winning 3–0 in an away match against Motor Lublin in the penultimate game of the season. The club achieved better results in the Polish Cup. In 1990, Legia defeated GKS Katowice in the final and won their ninth trophy. A year later, the Warsaw club again faced GKS Katowice in the final of the Polish Cup, but this time the rivals who won the match 1–0 turned out to be better. The next season, 1989–90, Legia won their ninth Polish Cup, meaning they were able to play in the UEFA Cup Winners' Cup in 1990–91. The Warsaw team, managed by Władysław Stachurski reached the semi-finals of the tournament, eliminating the likes of Sampdoria and Aberdeen. They lost in the semi-finals to Manchester United (1–3 in Warsaw and 1–1 in Manchester).

In autumn 1992, the first private sponsor, businessman Janusz Romanowski, invested in the club. A two-year sponsorship deal was signed with FSO (worth PLN 2.4 billion at that time) as well as with Adidas. After the fourth round of the 1992–93 season, Janusz Wójcik became the Legia coach. The high budget from the sponsorship deals allowed players such as Maciej Śliwowski and Radosław Michalski to be brought in. This, in turn, translated into better results and joining the competition for the national championship. On 20 June 1993, after an away victory of 6–0 against Wisła Kraków, the team won the Polish championship. However, on the next day the president of the PZPN board, with a 5–4 vote, decided to take the title from Legia and award it to the third team in the table – Lech Poznań (after disallowing the last matches of Legia and ŁKS, the team from Poznań took first place in the table). The decision was due to the allegations of bribery in the last league match. In addition, Legia was forced to pay a fine of 500 million zlotys, and the UEFA authorities excluded the team from European competition. Twice (December 2004, January 2007), the club unsuccessfully requested that the unfavorable decision should be repealed and that the title should be restored. In the same season, the anti-doping committee decided that Legia player Roman Zub had played after doping before the match against Widzew Łódź. The player's urine sample was also tested in a laboratory in Moscow, where it was considered that increased testosterone levels were not the result of doping. The match was initially verified as a walkover for the Łódź team, but the decision of the PZPN games department was revoked by the president of the board.

In the next season, Legia won the first triple crown in the history of Polish football. On 15 June 1994, thanks to a 1–1 draw in the last round with Górnik Zabrze in Warsaw, the legionaries maintained a one-point advantage over second place GKS Katowice and won their fifth Polish title, despite the fact that the season began with three negative points due to the events of the last round in the last season. After the match the press published accusations of corruption with referee Sławomir Redzinski, who, when the score was 1–0 to Górnik, sent off three of the Górnik players. These allegations have not been proven. On 18 June, in the Polish Cup final held at the Legia stadium, the Legia defeated ŁKS Łódź 2–0 and won the tenth trophy in their history. In the match for the Super Cup (24 July), Legia also faced ŁKS Łódź and won 6–4 at the stadium in Płock. The club's first experience of the Champions League ended in defeat in the qualifying stage – the team fell to Croatian side Hajduk Split (0–1 at home, 0–4 away).

The next season began with the signing of a contract with Canal+ for broadcasting matches (the first match of the Polish league broadcast was the match of Legia against GKS Katowice, which took place on 1 April 1995). On 31 May 1995, Legia won their sixth Polish championship after a 3–0 victory against Raków Częstochowa in Warsaw, and also won the Polish Cup (2–0 in the final with GKS Katowice). At that time, one of the first protest actions took place at the stadium. The reason was high ticket prices and the ban on hanging flags and banners on the fence – the conflict ended after three matches in Warsaw thanks to an agreement with activists. After winning the championship in the 1994–95 season, Legia Warszawa qualified for the Champions League – in the last qualifying round it defeated the Swedish team IFK Göteborg (1–0 in Warsaw and 2–1 in Gothenburg). In the group stage, Legia drew with Rosenborg BK, Spartak Moscow and Blackburn Rovers. Legia finished the group in second place (with seven points) and in the quarterfinals they faced Panathinaikos Athens. The first match in Warsaw ended in a goalless draw, and in the rematch at the Olympic Stadium in Athens, the Greeks won 3–0. The club did not defend the national championship in the 1995–96 competition and took second place in the league table (behind Widzew Łódź).

In 1997, the club was transformed into Sportowa Spółka Akcyjna (SSA) Legia Warsaw and a new sponsor was acquired, South Korean company Daewoo. This season, the legionaries took second place in the league, one reason being a 2–3 loss to Widzew Łódź in the decisive phase of the games (Legia led up until the 85th minute of the match 2–0). The same year Legia went on to win the Polish Cup and the Super Cup. A big change in that period was the addition of Daewoo as a member to the club's name (CWKS "Legia-Daewoo" Warsaw) – the new name did not please fans of Legia and was received coldly by them.

The 1997–98 season saw the club's last appearance in the UEFA Cup Winners' Cup. After passing Glenavon in the qualifying round (with a 1–1 draw in Northern Ireland and a 4–0 win in Warsaw), the team fell to Italian team Vicenza Calcio in the first round of the tournament (losing away 0–2 and drawing at home 1–1). In the league the team took 5th place in the table, and in the Polish Cup reached the 1/8 finals, losing to Amica Wronki 0–3. The next season, 1998–99, ended with a bronze medal in the league. In the national cup the team for the second time in a row was eliminated at stage 1/8 of the tournament; This time, GKS Bełchatów was the one to beat the Warsaw team, who after a goalless result in the regular time of the game won 3–2 in the penalty shootout.

The club played its 100th match in European competitions – the meeting with Macedonian team Vardar Skopje as part of the 1/64 UEFA Cup final ended with Legia's away victory 5–0 on 12 August 1999. In the 1999–2000 season, Legia took fourth place in the league and did not get to play in the European competitions. In the Polish Cup, the team fell in the quarterfinals to Amica Wronki after a series of penalty kicks (ended with a 3–1 result), while in the League Cup reached the final, in which they lost at home with Polonia Warsaw 1–2.

=== 2000–2010 ===
In March 2001, the main shareholder of the club, Daewoo, withdrew from the club's financing, and on 1 July the name of the former sponsor was removed from the club's name and it was reverted to ASPN CWKS "Legia" Warszawa SSA. In the 2000–01 season, the team finished third in the Polish league, and in the Polish Cup lost in the quarterfinals, losing on aggregate 1–4 with Zagłębie Lubin. The same result was achieved by the team in the League Cup – in the quarterfinals of the tournament the team lost to Wisla Kraków, a draw in Warsaw 1–1 and a loss in Kraków 1–3. In the UEFA Cup qualifying round, Legia won against Etzella Ettelbruck (4–0 away, 2–1 in Warsaw), and in the next match they defeated IF Elfsborg (4–1 at home, 6–1 in Sweden). The rival of Legia in the second round was Valencia CF. In the first match at the Polish Army stadium there was a 1–1 draw, but in the rematch the Spaniards won 6–1.

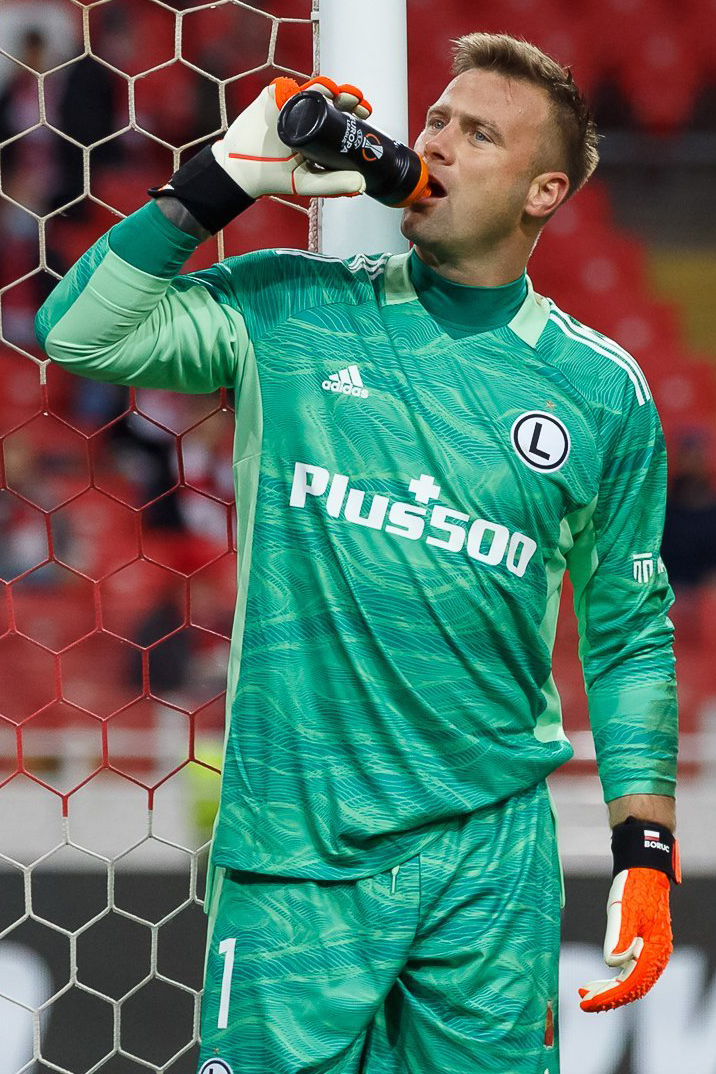
Artur Boruc played his first league match for Legia in 2001–02 season

The 2001–02 season, which was led by Dragomir Okuki, ended in Legia's seventh championship title (after a 0–0 draw with Odra Wodzisław in Warsaw), as well as a triumph in the Polish League Cup (3–0 and 1–2 in the final with Wisła Kraków). In competing for the Polish Cup, the team reached the quarter-finals, where it lost to Ruch Chorzów (2–4 in Warsaw, 1–0 in Chorzów). Legia played in the Champions League qualifiers in the summer, but in the third round they fell against FC Barcelona – in the first match at Camp Nou, the Catalans won 3–0, in the second they beat Legia 1–0. After defeat against the Spaniards, the Warsaw team competed in the UEFA Cup. In the first round Legia beat FC Utrecht (4–1 at home and 3–1 away), in the second round they were eliminated by Schalke – 2–3 in Warsaw, 0–0 in Gelsenkirchen.

The legionaries finished the 2002–03 season in 4th place, in the Polish Cup they fell in the 3rd round. On 13 June 2003, the name of the club changed to KP "Legia" Warszawa SSA and on the same day the team was greeted by a new coach, Dariusz Kubicki.

The club was purchased by ITI Group on 8 April 2004. The team took second place in the league and played in the Polish Cup final, in which it lost to Lech Poznań. The next season, 2004–05, the Warsaw team came third in the league table, and in the national cup they lost in the semi-final, falling to Dyskobolia Grodzisk Wielkopolski – 1–1, 1–1, 1–4 on aggregate penalties.

The 2005–06 season was exceptional in the club's history – Legia celebrated its 90th anniversary. First, the team dropped out of the UEFA Cup in the second qualifying round (0–1 in Warsaw and 2–4 in Zurich with FC Zürich) and had a weak start in the league. In addition, they only reached the quarter-finals of the Polish Cup, losing on the aggregate with Korona Kielce. Nevertheless, the legionaries won the eighth Polish championship after winning 1–0 in a match against Górnik Zabrze. After the arrival of the new coach Dariusz Wdowczyk, they managed to make up for seven points when they were behind Wisła Kraków and reach for the title; The Warsaw City Council decided at that time to finance the modernization of the Legia stadium through the construction of three new grandstands and the extension of the covered grandstand. After four years, the legionnaires again stood a chance of winning promotion to the group stage of the Champions League. In the second round of qualifying they beat Hafnarfjarðar – 1–0 away, 2–0 at home. Shakhtar Donetsk turned out to be the next rival in the decisive third stage. Both meetings ended with the defeat of Legia – 0–1 in Donetsk and 2–3 in Warsaw. They attempted to make up for the failure playing against Austria Vienna in the first round of the UEFA Cup. However, Legia did not manage to defeat the Austrian opponent; in the first match in Warsaw the team drew 1–1, and in the return the hosts won 1–0.

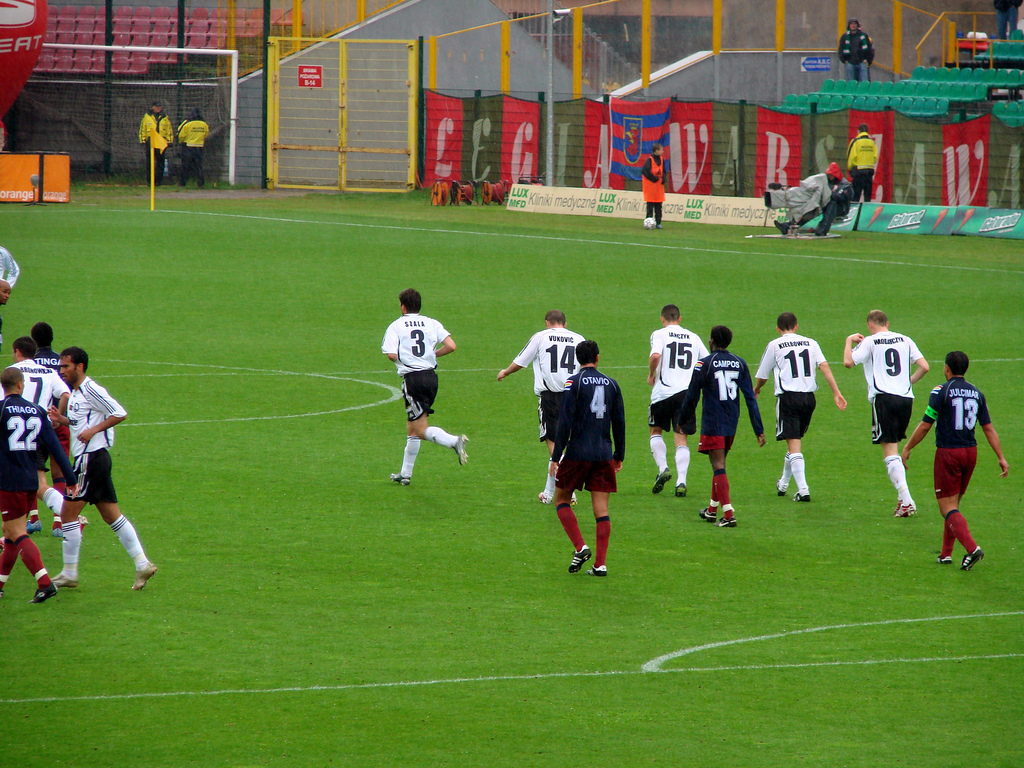
Home game with Pogoń Szczecin in the 2006–07 Ekstraklasa

In following competitions, Legia dropped out of the fight for the Polish Cup in the 1/16 finals, falling to fourth-division team Stal Sanok, and in the league they won third place. In addition, as part of the Ekstraklasa Cup, the team reached the quarterfinals and lost on aggregate with Górnik Łęczna. The year 2007 brought a change of the coat of arms. The club did not agree with CWKS, which had the rights to the previous logo. The club's board registered their logotype, boycotted by the fans, because it did not resemble the old mark (despite similar colors and the letter "L" had a different outline and arrangement of colors). Eventually, it was not implemented and it was established that the official sign will be modified with the white letter "L" on the black shield. However, the shape differed from the historical one and resembled a triangle, not like the original coat of arms.

At the beginning of the 2007–08 season in Vilnius there were riots caused by Legia fans, which had their apogee at the stadium of FK Vėtra during the match of the second round of the Intertoto Cup. Hooligans, among others devastated the stadium and attacked the police, as a result of which the match was stopped at 2–0 for the Lithuanian club. A few days later, the UEFA Disciplinary Commission verified the result of the meeting with Vėtra for a 3–0 win for the hosts and banned Legia from the current European Cup and qualifying for European competition (UEFA Champions League, UEFA Cup, Intertoto Cup) for the next five years. UEFA also forced the Warsaw club to cover all losses caused by rioters at the host stadium. After submitting the appeal, the penalty was temporarily suspended, taking into account the changes made to enhance safety at Legia's matches.

At the halfway point of the league games Legia took second place, even though it scored more points than in the championship season 2005–06. The legionaries were ten points behind first place Wisła Kraków. Eventually, the team reached the Polish Cup and Polish Super Cup after winning against Wisla Kraków twice (0–0, 4–3 pen. and 2–1), and also won the runner-up title. The legionaries secured their UEFA Cup performance in the next season. In addition, the team played in the Ekstraklasa Cup final. The meeting played in Grodzisk Wielkopolski was won by the local Dyskobolia, which after the 4–1 victory won the trophy. In the spring round of the competition, the club joined the campaign Let's Kick Racism from the Stadium, organized by the Never Again Association – Nigdy Więcej – the players ran out on 22 March in a match against Widzew Łódź in shirts with the campaign's name.

In the 2008–09 season Legia started by defeating the Belarusian club FC Gomel (0–0 and 4–1) in the first round of the UEFA Cup qualifying round. In the second the legionaries went to the Russian FC Moscow. Both matches ended with the defeat of legionnaires: in Warsaw 1–2, and in Moscow 0–2. The only goal scored for Legia was by Roger Guerreiro. In the league, the team repeated the previous year's achievement, finishing second at the end of the season. The team also reached the semi-finals of the Polish Cup, in which they lost to Ruch Chorzow. In the competition for the Ekstraklasa Cup, Legia appeared in the quarterfinals and was eliminated by GKS Bełchatów.

=== 2011–2020 ===
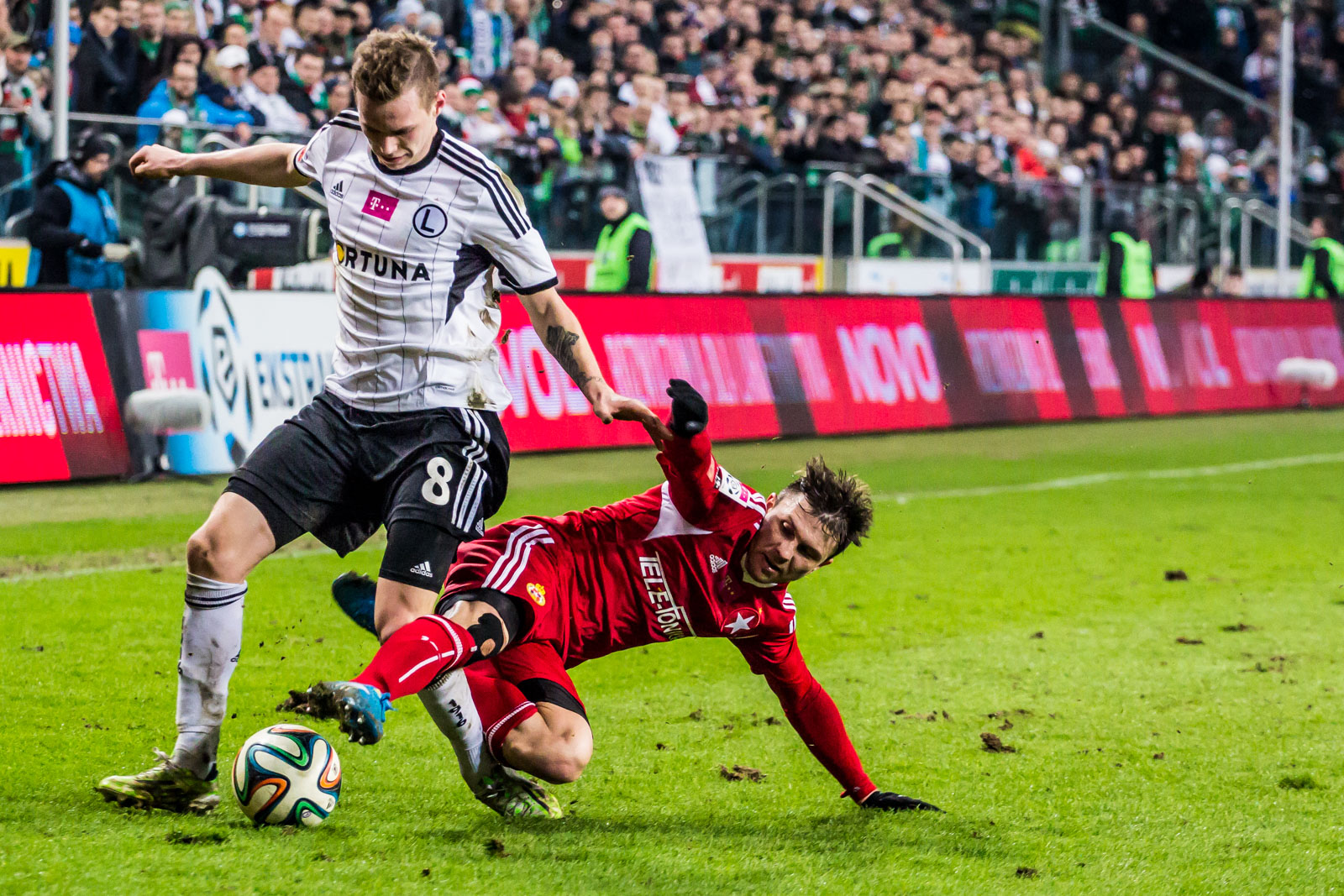
Home game with Wisła Kraków in the 2014–15 Ekstraklasa

Legia won its 10th title with another league championship at the end of the 2013–14 Ekstraklasa season. Legia qualified for the 2016–17 Champions League group stages for the first time in 21 years after defeating Dundalk on 23 August 2016. The Legionnaires found themselves in group F with the likes of Real Madrid, Borussia Dortmund, and Sporting CP. They finished third place after winning 1–0 against Sporting on the last match day in the group stage, sending them to the round of 32 of the 2016–17 UEFA Europa League. Legia was drawn against Ajax where the first match fell goalless in Warsaw.

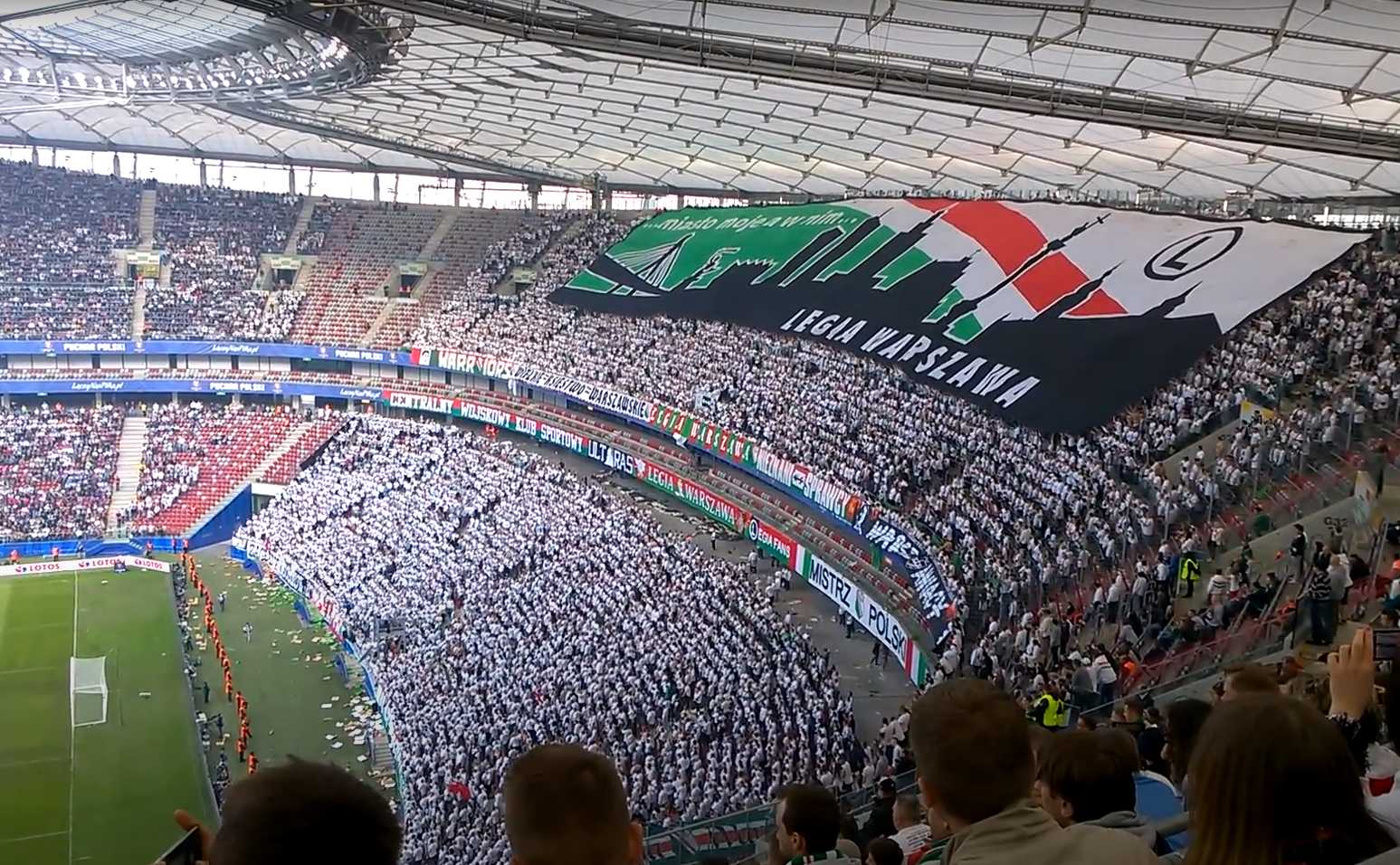
Legia supporters on National Stadium during 2015–16 Polish Cup final

Legia won its 12th League title in the 2016–17 Ekstraklasa season. They finished with a 0–0 draw against Lechia Gdańsk. Legia needed a draw in the match between Jagiellonia Białystok and Lech Poznań which finished 2–2 and gave Legia the title.

Legia's third consecutive Eksrtaklasa title was won in dramatic circumstances. Needing to win away to Lech Poznan to guarantee the title, a 3–0 victory was awarded to Legia after the game was abandoned. Lech fans threw flares and invaded the pitch after Legia scored to make it 2–0 in the 77th minute, after which the referee called the game off. The result meant Legia won the league, finishing three points above second placed Jagiellonia Białystok.

=== 2021–present ===
On 28 April 2021, three rounds before the end of the 2020–21 Ekstraklasa season, the players from Łazienkowska won the fifteenth Polish championship, thanks to a goalless draw between Jagiellonia Białystok and Raków Częstochowa. Thus, Legia took the independent lead in the all-time classification in terms of the number of domestic titles.

On 26 August 2021, Legia defeated Slavia Prague, and for the first time in five years qualified to the group stages of a European cup. In the UEFA Europa League they were drawn to play in a group stage against Leicester City, Napoli and Spartak Moscow. After the first two matches won, away with Spartak and at home with Leicester 1–0 each, Legia lost four consecutive matches and ended up at the bottom of the group.

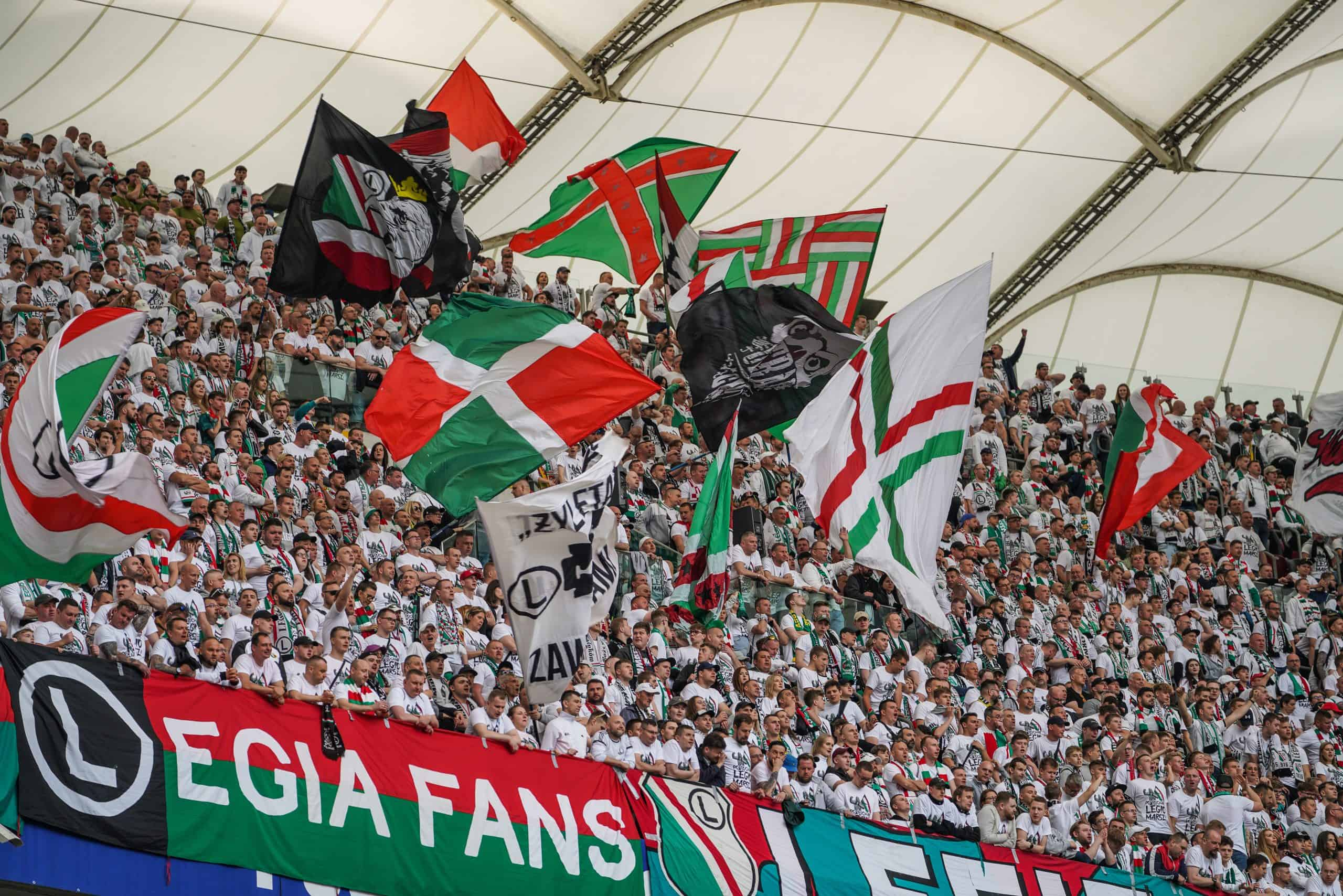
Legia supporters during the 2022–23 Polish Cup final against Raków Częstochowa

In 2023, Legia won two major trophies: the Polish Cup and the Polish Super Cup, both winning over Raków Częstochowa after a penalty shoot-out series. In the 2023–24 season, Legia Warsaw took part in the UEFA Europa Conference League group stage for the first time in its history, where they were drawn into Group E alongside Aston Villa, AZ and Zrinjski Mostar. Following their opening 3–2 victory over Aston Villa, Legia earned a total of 12 points and advanced to the knockout round play-offs out of second place.

== Stadium & facilities ==
Legia plays its games at Legia Warsaw Municipal Stadium of Marshal Józef Piłsudski (Polish: Stadion Miejski Legii Warszawa im. Marszałka Józefa Piłsudskiego), traditionally also referred to as the Polish Army Stadium (Polish: Stadion Wojska Polskiego), which is an all-seater football-specific stadium in Warsaw, Poland. Legia has been playing there since 9 August 1930. With space for 31,103 spectators it is the 5th biggest football stadium in the Ekstraklasa. The stadium underwent significant reconstruction between 2008 and 2011, during which all of the stands were demolished and replaced with bigger and more modern ones which increased the stadium's capacity from 13,500 to 31,103 seats. The Polish Army Stadium is currently owned by the City of Warsaw. Additionally to the main stadium and its surrounding infrastructure, the club has a newly built Legia Training Center completed in June 2020. Facility is located in Książenice in Gmina Grodzisk Mazowiecki. Legia Training Center has been designated for the Legia Warsaw first team and their reserves and youth teams, as U18, U17, U16 and U15. The center facilities are, among others, eight pitches; six with natural turf and two with artificial turf, hotel part and dormitory for players aged 13–18.

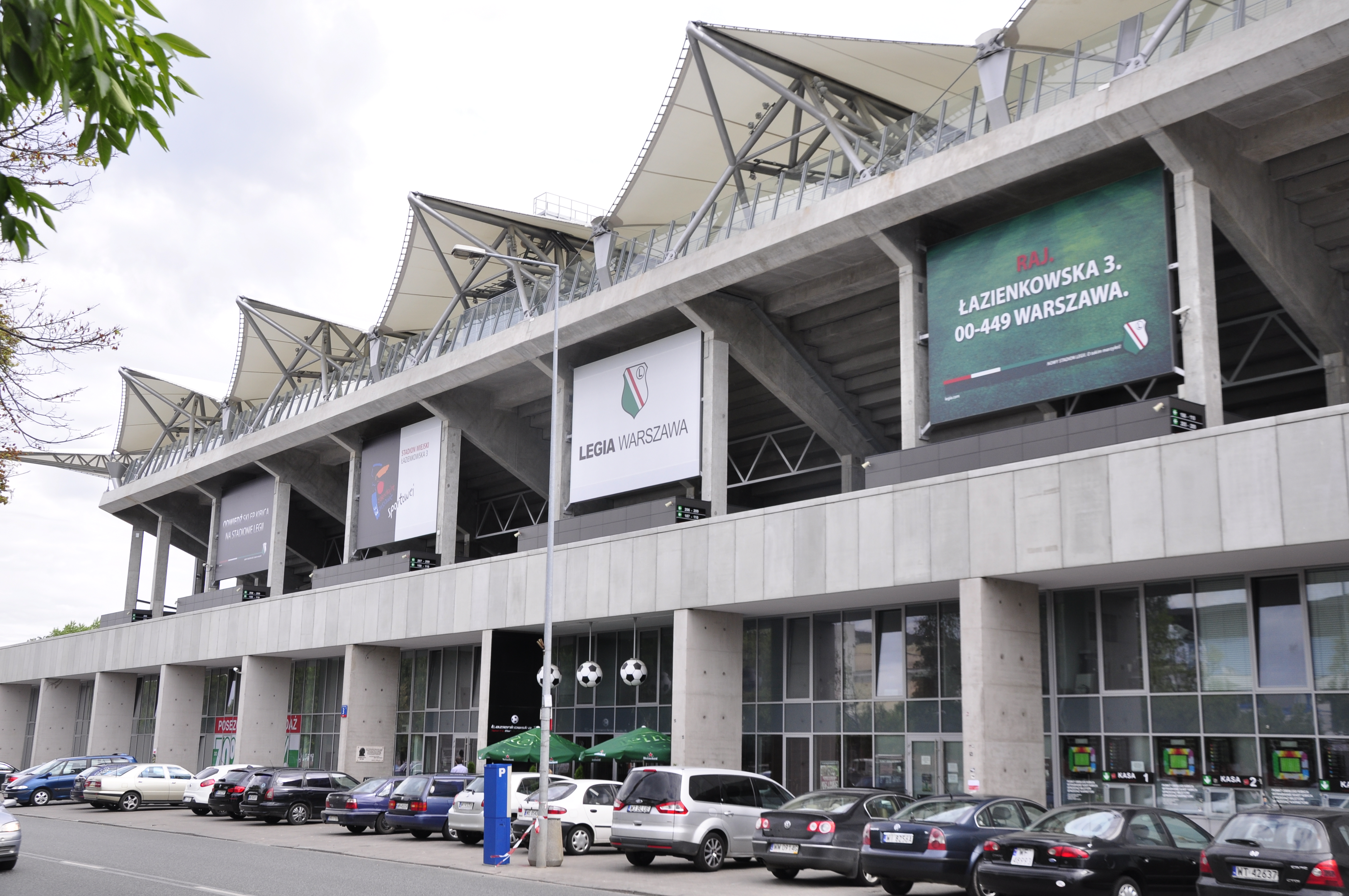
Stadium exterior

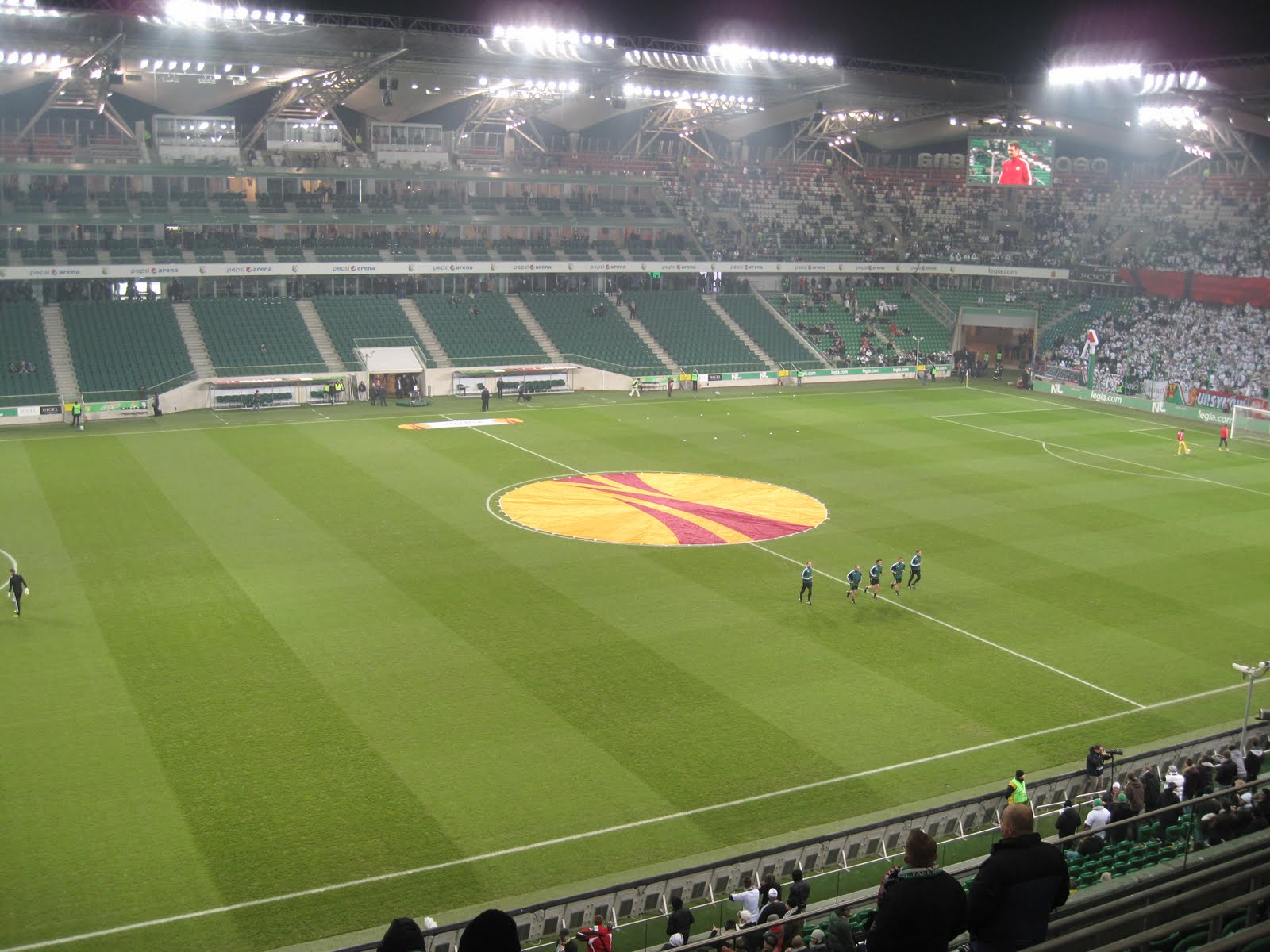
VIP Stand

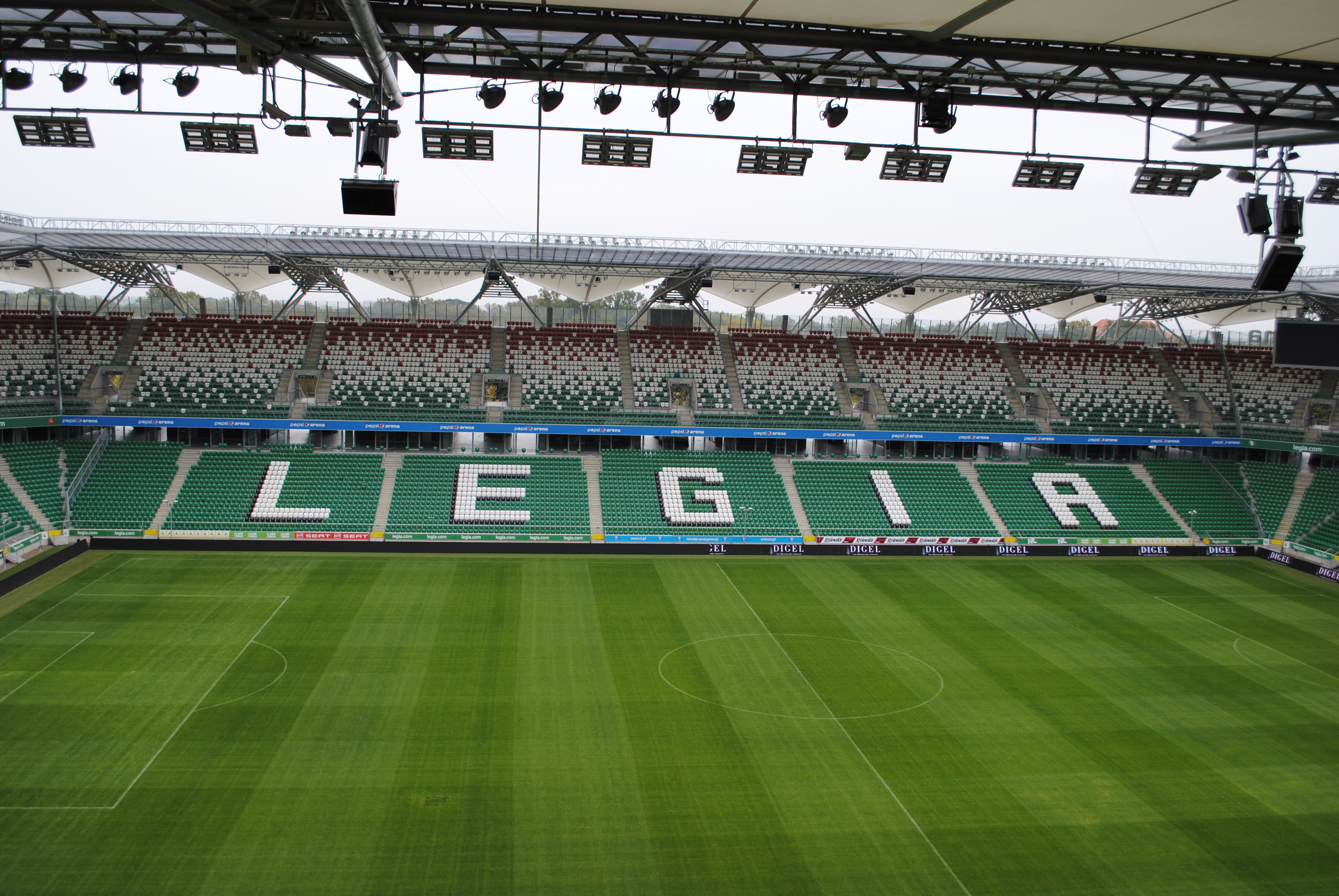
The eastern stand named after Kazimierz Deyna

== Sponsors ==
Years	Football kit	Main sponsor
1978–90	Adidas	–
1990–91	Umbro	Müller
1991	Lotto	Müller
1992–95	Adidas	FSO
1995–96	Adidas	Canal +
1996–00	Nike	Daewoo
2001	Adidas	Daewoo
2001–02	Adidas	Pol-Mot
2002–03	Adidas	Kredyt Bank
2008–10	Adidas	n
2011–14	Adidas	Active Jet
2005–	Adidas	Królewskie
2014–2020	Adidas	Fortuna
2020–	Adidas	Plus500

== Club identity and supporters ==
Legia Warsaw gained devotion from generations of fans from Warsaw as well as around the country, mainly in Masovian Voivodeship. Legia supporters are considered very spontaneous and dedicated. Accordingly, in terms of quality of football support, they are also often described as the best supporters in Poland. Groups of fans follow Legia for practically all away matches, both domestic and international. Supporters of Legia occasionally attract also some negative attention, in particular after events such as riots in Lithuania during a match against Vėtra Vilnius on 10 July 2007.

The beginning of Legia Warsaw's organized fan movement is associated with matches in European cups, in the 1970s, when Legia fans came into contact with Western fan culture. Above all, for Legia fans, the April 1, 1970 match against Feyenoord was a breakthrough. Impressed by the way the clubs' colors and symbols were worn and displayed by the Dutch fans, a large group of Legia fans began to imitate them.

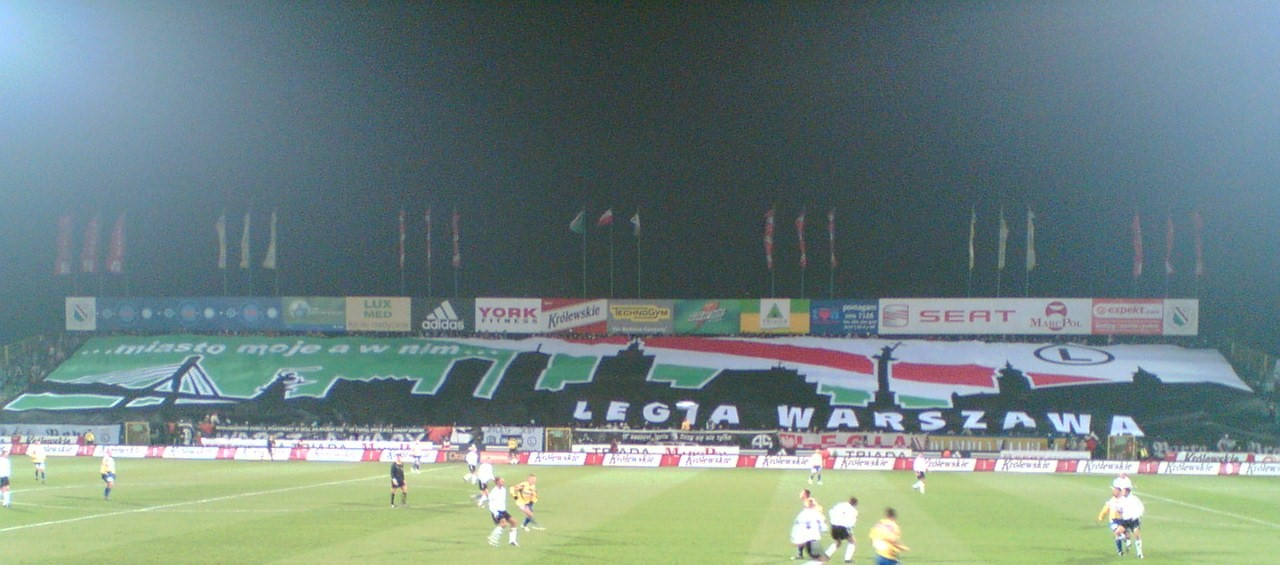
The old Żyleta stand

Traditionally, the most devoted and spontaneous fans occupy the Żyleta stand in their stadium. Before the stadium renovation (2008–2011), the "old" Żyleta referred only to the center section within the eastern stand of the stadium (occasionally, it would also refer to eastern stand as a whole). There is a special exhibition dedicated to the "old" Żyleta in the Legia Warsaw Museum. Today, after the stadium's renovation, the "new" Żyleta means the whole northern stand of stadium (located behind the goal).

Politically, the supporters of Legia tend to be more right wing. During communist times, in particular during the 1980s, Legia fans showed their patriotic, nationalist and strongly anti-communistic views. Today, the fans actively participate in annual commemorations of the Warsaw Uprising and Polish Independence Day. Legia fans are also vocal with their views on domestic issues, e.g. their conflict with the Polish Prime Minister Donald Tusk, as well as on international politics, e.g. by way of displaying banners reading "Kosovo is Serbian" at the stadium. On 22 October 2014, when Legia played against the Ukrainian club Metalist Kharkiv they displayed a banner with the names Lwów (Lviv) and Wilno (Vilnius) along with the flag and a prewar coat of arms of Poland on the background, which led to negative reactions. On 19 August 2015, in Lviv and Kyiv, where Legia played with Zorya, clashes between Ukrainian and Polish fans occurred. On 9 April 2022, during an away match against Lech Poznań, Legia fans displayed a banner with an image of Putin hanging from a noose in a Spartak Moscow shirt. In May 2024, Legia Warsaw supporters held up a banner criticising Warsaw’s mayor Rafał Trzaskowski, whom they condemned for restricting religious symbols in public offices. In October 2024, Legia supporters held up a banner reading "We don’t want Berlin, Lampedusa, France here – zero tolerance for migrants!".

In July 2024, Legia Warsaw ultras unveiled a banner before a league match against Zagłębie Lubin, displaying the phrase "Refugees Welcome" alongside violent and xenophobic imagery. The banner depicted two men armed with a baseball bat and hammer, and a woman holding a pig’s head, interpreted as a hostile parody of pro-refugee slogans and a rejection of EU migration policy.

== Relations with other clubs ==
Domestically, Legia Warsaw supporters maintain friendly relations with fans of Radomiak Radom, Zagłębie Sosnowiec and Olimpia Elbląg. Internationally, Legia supporters maintain friendly relations with fans of ADO Den Haag and Juventus. Their domestic rivals include almost all the other Polish teams that play at the domestic top-tier league level. Warsaw clubs, Polonia Warsaw, KS Warszawianka and Gwardia Warsaw, were Legia's main league rivals, but since 2013 none of them competes in Ekstraklasa. One of their biggest rivals is also Lech Poznań with whom they contest the "Derby of Poland".

=== Warsaw derby ===
The Warsaw derby is a match between Legia and Polonia Warsaw

Matches	Legia wins	Draws	Polonia wins
78	29	20	29

Other local rivalries

Between Legia and Gwardia Warsaw

Matches	Legia wins	Draws	Gwardia wins
50	19	16	15

Between Legia and KS Warszawianka

Matches	Legia wins	Draws	KS Warszawianka wins
20	10	2	8

== Honours ==
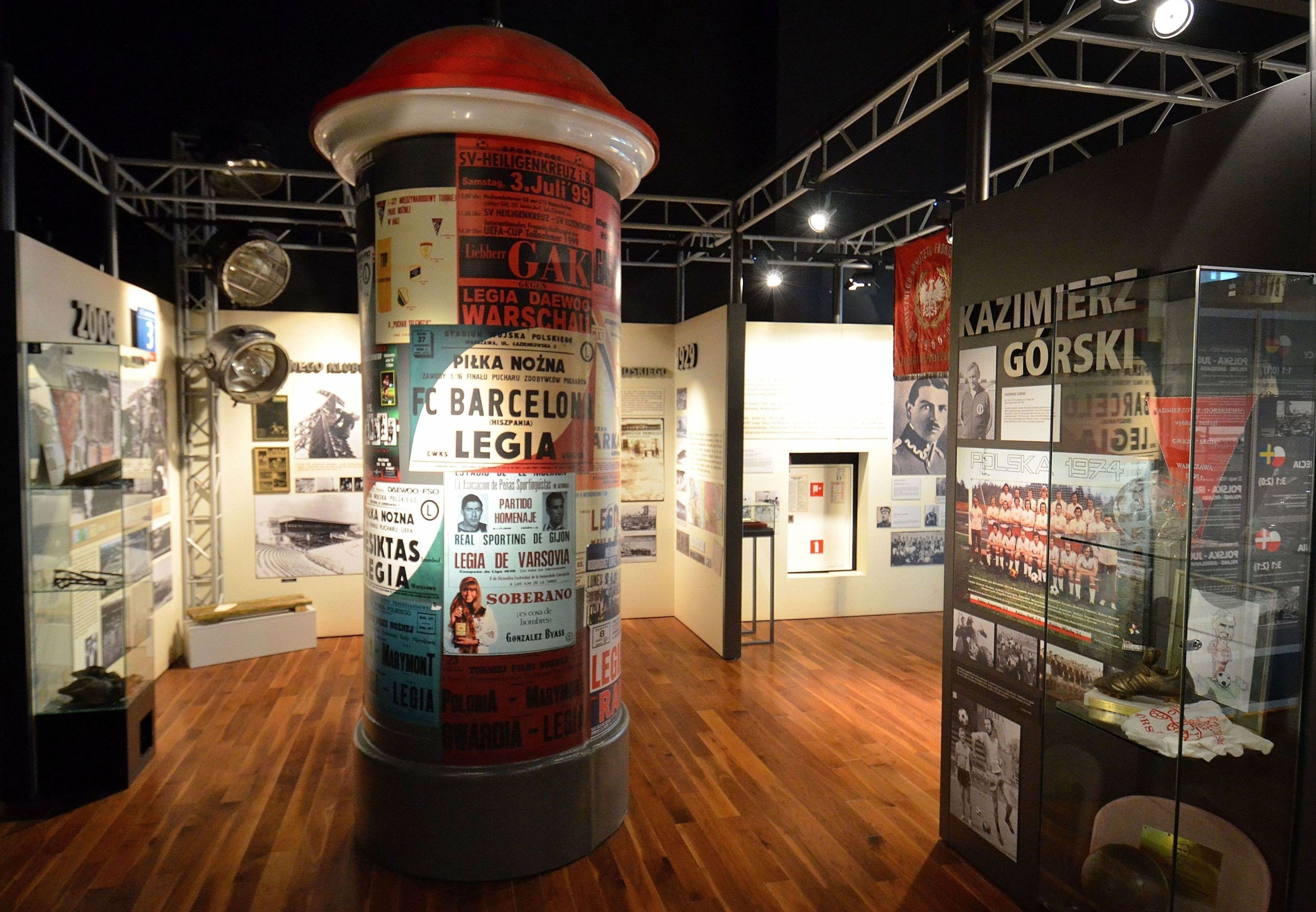
Legia Warsaw Museum opened in 2006

=== Domestic ===
As of 13 July 2025.

Type	Competition	Titles	Seasons
Domestic	Ekstraklasa (Polish Championship)	15	1955, 1956, 1968–69, 1969–70, 1993–94, 1994–95, 2001–02, 2005–06, 2012–13, 2013–14, 2015–16, 2016–17, 2017–18, 2019–20, 2020–21 (Note: Legia also won 1st place in 1992–93 Ekstraklasa, but their final game v Wisła Kraków was cancelled due to allegations of "unsportsmanlike conduct during the game". Consequently, Legia was dropped into second place in the table. The Polish FA (PZPN) decided to give the championship to Lech Poznań. "I liga 1992/1993". 90minut.pl.)
Domestic	Polish Cup	21	1954–55, 1955–56, 1963–64, 1965–66, 1972–73, 1979–80, 1980–81, 1988–89, 1989–90, 1993–94, 1994–95, 1996–97, 2007–08, 2010–11, 2011–12, 2012–13, 2014–15, 2015–16, 2017–18, 2022–23, 2024–25
Domestic	Polish League Cup	1^{s}	2002
Domestic	Polish Super Cup	6^{s}	1989, 1994, 1997, 2008, 2023, 2025

- ^{s} shared record

=== Europe ===
- European Cup/Champions League:
  - Semi-finals: 1969–70
  - Quarter-finals: 1970–71, 1995–96
  - Group stage: 2016–17
- UEFA Cup Winners' Cup:
  - Semi-finals: 1990–91
  - Quarter-finals: 1964–65, 1981–82
- UEFA Europa League:
  - Round of 32: 2011–12, 2014–15, 2016–17
  - Group stage: 2013–14, 2015–16, 2021–22
- UEFA Conference League:
  - Quarter-finals: 2024–25
  - Knockout play-offs round: 2023–24

== Legia Warsaw in international football ==
=== UEFA and IFFHS rankings ===
UEFA Club coefficient ranking

Rank	Team	Points
67	(Greece) Panathinaikos	29.250
68	(Greece) AEK Athens	28.500
69	(Poland) Legia Warsaw	28.500
70	(Austria) Rapid Wien	28.250
71	(Belgium) Anderlecht	28.250

Last updated: 27 August 2026

Source: UEFA

IFFHS Club World ranking

Rank	Team	Points
76	(Saudi Arabia) Al-Hilal	175.750
77	(Czech Republic) Sparta Prague	174.500
78	(Poland) Legia Warsaw	172.500
79	(Greece) Panathinaikos	170.500
80	(Bulgaria) Ludogorets Razgrad	169.250

Last updated: 28 December 2025

Source: IFFHS

=== Best results in European competitions ===
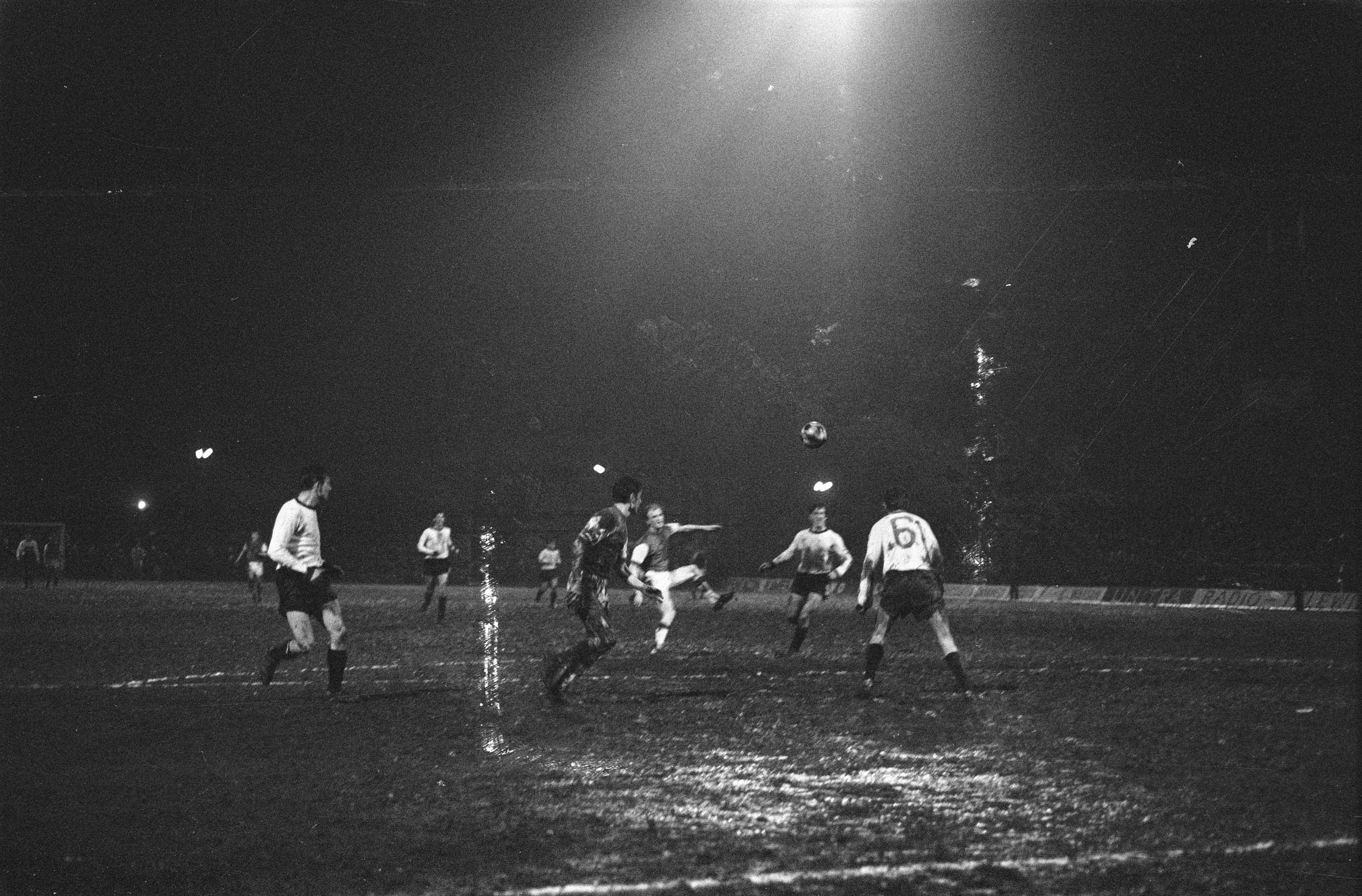
Home game with Feyenoord in the semi-finals of the 1969–70 European Cup

Season	Achievement	Opponents	Notes
European Cup / UEFA Champions League
1969–70	Semi-Final	(Romania) UTA Arad, (France) Saint-Étienne, (Turkey) Galatasaray, (Netherlands) Feyenoord	lost to (Netherlands) Feyenoord 0–0 in Warsaw, 0–2 in Rotterdam
1970–71	Quarter-Final	(Sweden) Göteborg, (Belgium) Standard Liège, (Spain) Atlético Madrid	lost to (Spain) Atlético Madrid 0–1 in Madrid, 2–1 in Warsaw
1995–96	Quarter-Final	(Sweden) Göteborg, (Norway) Rosenborg, (Russia) Spartak Moscow, (England) Blackburn Rovers, (Greece) Panathinaikos	lost to (Greece) Panathinaikos 0–0 in Warsaw, 0–3 in Athens
UEFA Cup / UEFA Europa League
1985–86	Third round	(Norway) Viking, (Hungary) Videoton Fehérvár, (Italy) Internazionale	lost to (Italy) Internazionale 0–1 in Warsaw, 0–0 in Milan
2011–12	Round of 32	(Turkey) Gaziantepspor, (Russia) Spartak Moscow, (Netherlands) PSV Eindhoven, (Israel) Hapoel Tel Aviv, (Romania) Rapid București, (Portugal) Sporting CP	lost to (Portugal) Sporting CP 2–2 in Warsaw, 0–1 in Lisbon
2014–15	Round of 32	(Kazakhstan) Aktobe, (Turkey) Trabzonspor, (Belgium) Lokeren (Ukraine) Metalist Kharkiv, (Netherlands) Ajax	lost to (Netherlands) Ajax 0–3 in Warsaw, 0–1 in Amsterdam
2016–17	Round of 32	(Netherlands) Ajax (Legia directly entered the round of 32)	lost to (Netherlands) Ajax 0–0 in Warsaw, 0–1 in Amsterdam
UEFA Europa Conference League / UEFA Conference League
2023–24	Round of 32	(Kazakhstan) Ordabasy, Austria Wien, (Denmark) Midtjylland, (Netherlands) AZ, (England) Aston Villa, (Bosnia and Herzegovina) Zrinjski Mostar, (Norway) Molde	lost to (Norway) Molde 2–3 in Molde, 0–3 in Warsaw
2024–25	Quarter-Final	(Wales) Caernarfon Town, (Denmark) Brøndby, (Kosovo) Drita, (Spain) Real Betis, (Sweden) Djurgårdens, (Cyprus) Omonia, (Switzerland) Lugano, (Serbia) TSC, (Belarus) Dinamo Minsk, (Norway) Molde, (England) Chelsea	lost to (England) Chelsea 0–3 in Warsaw, 2–1 in London
European Cup Winners' Cup
1964–65	Quarter-Final	(Austria) Admira Wacker, (Turkey) Galatasaray, (West Germany) 1860 München	lost to (West Germany) 1860 München 0–4 in Warsaw, 0–0 in Munich
1981–82	Quarter-Final	(Norway) Vålerenga, (Switzerland) Lausanne-Sport, (Soviet Union) Dinamo Tbilisi	lost to (Soviet Union) Dinamo Tbilisi 0–1 in Warsaw, 0–1 in Tbilisi
1990–91	Semi-Final	(Luxembourg) Swift Hesperange, (Scotland) Aberdeen, (Italy) Sampdoria, (England) Manchester United	lost to (England) Manchester United 1–3 in Warsaw, 1–1 in Manchester

== Club records ==
- Number of seasons in Ekstraklasa: 73 (from 1927 to 1936 and from 1948–present)
- Biggest win in the league: 19 August 1956 Legia Warsaw – Wisła Kraków 12–0 (5–0)
- Biggest defeat in the league: 3 September 1927 Pogoń Lwów – Legia Warsaw 11–2 (6–1)
- Longest series of victories in the league: 9 (in 1931 and 1932)
- Longest series of defeats in the league: 7 (1936 and 2021)
- Oldest goalscorer: Lucjan Brychczy – 37 years, 2 months, 25 days
- Youngest goalscorer: Ariel Borysiuk – 16 years, 8 months, 5 days

=== Most appearances ===
As of 11 November 2025, the players with the most appearances for Legia are:

#	Name	Career	Appearances
1	Lucjan Brychczy	1954–72	452
2	Artur Jędrzejczyk	2006–13; 2016, 2017–26	420
3	Jacek Zieliński	1992–2005	404
4	(Serbia) (Poland) Miroslav Radović	2006–15; 2016–19	391
5	Kazimierz Deyna	1966–78	390
6	Jakub Rzeźniczak	2004–06; 2007–17	376
7	Michał Kucharczyk	2010–19, 2025	350
8	Marek Jóźwiak	1988–96; 2001–05	348
9	Horst Mahseli	1955–69	347
10	Tomasz Kiełbowicz	2001–13	339

- **Bold** – still active

=== Top goalscorers ===
As of 26 June 2019 the ten players with the most goals for Legia are:

#	Player	Career	Goals
1	Lucjan Brychczy	1954–72	226
2	Kazimierz Deyna	1966–78	141
3	Józef Nawrot	1927–36	107
4	(Serbia) (Poland) Miroslav Radović	2006–15; 2016–19	91
5	Robert Gadocha	1966–75	88
6	Marek Saganowski	2002–05; 2012–16	87
7	Janusz Żmijewski	1960–72	80
8	Cezary Kucharski	1995–97; 1997–99; 2000–03; 2005–06	79
9	Marcin Mięciel	1994–2002; 2009–10	75
9	Marian Łańko	1925–30	75

- **Bold** – still active

== Players ==
=== Current squad ===
As of 9 September 2026

Note: Flags indicate national team as defined under FIFA eligibility rules; some limited exceptions apply. Players may hold more than one non-FIFA nationality.

No.	Pos.	Nation	Player
1	GK	CRO	Ivan Brkić
2	DF	JPN	Shinnosuke Fukuda (on loan from Kyoto Sanga FC)
3	DF	POL	Mateusz Lauryn
4	MF	POL	Damian Szymański
5	DF	USA	Robert Deziel Jr.
6	MF	POR	Henrique Arreiol
7	FW	CZE	Jan Kuchta (on loan from Sparta Prague)
8	MF	POL	Rafał Augustyniak (vice-captain)
9	FW	POL	Rafał Adamski
11	MF	POL	Kacper Chodyna
13	DF	POL	Arkadiusz Reca
14	FW	CRO	Antonio Čolak
17	MF	POL	Mateusz Szczepaniak
19	DF	POR	Rúben Vinagre
20	FW	POL	Jakub Żewłakow

No.	Pos.	Nation	Player
21	MF	ARM	Vahan Bichakhchyan
22	MF	POL	Paweł Wszołek (3rd captain)
23	MF	CZE	Michal Ševčík (on loan from Sparta Prague)
24	DF	CRO	Zoran Arsenić
27	FW	UKR	Bohdan Vyunnyk (on loan from Lechia Gdańsk)
53	MF	POL	Wojciech Urbański
59	GK	POL	Jan Bienduga
67	MF	POL	Bartosz Kapustka (captain)
77	MF	POL	Filip Przybyłko
79	FW	POL	Łukasz Zjawiński
81	DF	POL	Bartosz Korżyński
89	GK	ROU	Otto Hindrich
91	DF	POL	Kamil Piątkowski
97	MF	BLR	Erik Mikanovich
99	FW	SVK	Samuel Kováčik

=== Out on loan ===
Note: Flags indicate national team as defined under FIFA eligibility rules; some limited exceptions apply. Players may hold more than one non-FIFA nationality.

No.	Pos.	Nation	Player
29	FW	DEN	Mileta Rajović (at Midtjylland until 30 June 2027)
30	DF	SLO	Petar Stojanović (at Maribor until 30 June 2027)

=== Retired numbers ===
Note: Flags indicate national team as defined under FIFA eligibility rules; some limited exceptions apply. Players may hold more than one non-FIFA nationality.

No.	Pos.	Nation	Player
10	MF	POL	Kazimierz Deyna (1966–78 – posthumous honour)
55	DF	POL	Artur Jędrzejczyk (2006–13, 2016, 2017–26)

=== Hall of Fame ===
This is a list of former players and coaches who have been inducted into the Legia Warsaw Hall of Fame.

- Adam Topolski
- Andrzej Sikorski
- Andrzej Strejlau
- Antoni Trzaskowski
- Bernard Blaut
- Dariusz Dziekanowski
- Edmund Zientara
- Henryk Grzybowski
- Jan Pieszko
- Janusz Żmijewski
- Jerzy Podbrożny
- Kazimierz Buda
- Kazimierz Deyna
- Kazimierz Górski
- Krzysztof Adamczyk
- Lesław Ćmikiewicz
- Leszek Pisz
- Lucjan Brychczy
- Maciej Śliwowski
- Paweł Janas
- Roman Kosecki
- Ryszard Milewski
- Stefan Białas
- Tadeusz Nowak
- Władysław Dąbrowski
- Władysław Stachurski

== Coaching staff ==
As of 4 July 2026

Position	Staff
Head coach	(Poland) Marek Papszun
Assistant coach	(Poland) Rafał Figiel
Assistant coach	(Poland) Marek Wasiluk
Assistant coach	(Poland) Artur Węska
Goalkeeping coach	(Poland) Maciej Kowal
Assistant goalkeeping coach	(Poland) Paweł Szajewski
Chief analyst	(Poland) Łukasz Cebula
Match analyst	(Poland) Dominik Ciarkowski
Match analyst	(Poland) Kamil Kuprianowicz
Head of performance	(Poland) Michał Garnys
Head of fitness department	(Poland) Tomasz Olszewski
Team doctor	(Poland) Filip Latawiec
Team doctor	(Poland) Marcin Tusiński
Head physiotherapist	(Poland) Bartosz Kot
Physiotherapist	(Poland) Kacper Balcerak
Physiotherapist	(Poland) Łukasz Gembarzewski
Physiotherapist	(Italy) Giovanni Mangano
Physiotherapist	(Poland) Dominik Ofat
Mental coach	(Poland) Paweł Frelik
Team manager	(Poland) Paweł Feliciak
Kitman	(Poland) Piotr Kubeł
Kitman	(Poland) Sebastian Wołowicz

== Management ==
Job	Name
Majority owner/President	(Poland) Dariusz Mioduski
Minority owner/Chairman of supervisory board	(United States) Michael Gorzynski
Managing director	(Poland) Marcin Herra
Chairman of Legia Foundation	(Poland) Anna Mioduska
Board advisor	(Switzerland) Bernhard Heusler
Head of football operations	(Germany) Fredi Bobic
Sporting director	(Poland) Michał Żewłakow
Scouting director	(Poland) Piotr Zasada

== Coaches ==
- (Hungary) József Ferenczi (December 1922 – May 1923)
- (Austria) Karl Fischer (May 1927 – October 1927)
- (Hungary) Elemér Kovács (March 1928 – November 1929)
- (Poland) Józef Kałuża (May 1930 – July 1930)
- (Poland) Stanisław Mielech (July 1933 – September 1933)
- (Austria) Gustav Wieser (October 1933 – October 1934)
- (Poland) Karol Hanke (March 1936 – November 1936)
- (Poland) Stanisław Grządziel (1945–46)
- (Czech Republic) František Dembický (March 1947 – November 1947)
- (Poland) Edward Drabiński (Feb 1948 – September 1948)
- (Poland) Marian Schaller (March 1949 – June 1949)
- (Poland) Wacław Kuchar (July 1949 – December 1953)
- (Hungary) János Steiner (February 1953 – December 1955)
- (Poland) Ryszard Koncewicz (1 July 1955 – 30 June 1958)
- (Poland) Kazimierz Górski (January 1959 – April 1959)
- (Socialist Federal Republic of Yugoslavia) Stjepan Bobek (April 1959 – Dec 1959)
- (Poland) Kazimierz Górski (1 January 1960 – 3 December 1962)
- (Poland) Longin Janeczek (December 1962 – December 1963)
- (Romania) Virgil Popescu (January 1964 – June 1965)
- (Poland) Longin Janeczek (July 1965 – June 1966)
- (Czech Republic) Jaroslav Vejvoda (July 1966 – June 1969)
- (Poland) Edmund Zientara (July 1969 – July 1971)
- (Poland) Tadeusz Chruściński (July 1971 – May 1972)
- (Poland) Lucjan Brychczy (26 March 1972 – 30 June 1973)
- (Czech Republic) Jaroslav Vejvoda (1973–1975)
- (Poland) Andrzej Strejlau (1 July 1975 – 30 June 1979)
- (Poland) Lucjan Brychczy (1 July 1979 – 15 October 1980)
- (Poland) Ignacy Ordon (10 October 1980 – June 1981)
- (Poland) Kazimierz Górski (1 July 1981 – 1 December 1982)
- (Poland) Jerzy Kopa (December 1982 – June 1985)
- (Poland) Jerzy Engel (1 July 1985 – 15 August 1987)
- (Poland) Lucjan Brychczy (27 August 1987 – 30 November 1987)
- (Poland) Andrzej Strejlau (1 December 1987 – 30 June 1989)
- (Poland) Rudolf Kapera (July 1989 – April 1990)
- (Poland) Lucjan Brychczy (15 April 1990 – 30 June 1990)
- (Poland) Władysław Stachurski (1 July 1990 – 20 August 1991)
- (Poland) Krzysztof Etmanowicz (August 1991 – August 1992)
- (Poland) Janusz Wójcik (1 September 1992 – 31 December 1993)
- (Poland) Paweł Janas (1 Jan 1994 – 30 June 1996)
- (Poland) Mirosław Jabłoński (1996)
- (Poland) Władysław Stachurski (1 July 1996 – 10 April 1997)
- (Poland) Mirosław Jabłoński (15 April 1997 – 15 April 1998)
- (Poland) Stefan Białas / (Poland) Jerzy Kopa (April 1998 – 1997)
- (Poland) Jerzy Kopa (1998 – January 1999)
- (Poland) Stefan Białas (15 December 1998 – 30 June 1999)
- (Poland) Dariusz Kubicki (1 July 1999 – 15 October 1999)
- (Poland) Franciszek Smuda (24 September 1999 – 8 March 2001)
- (Poland) Krzysztof Gawara (March 2001)
- (Serbia) Dragan Okuka (10 March 2001 – 12 June 2003)
- (Poland) Dariusz Kubicki (13 June 2003 – 1 October 2004)
- (Poland) L. Brychczy / (Poland) K. Gawara / (Poland) J. Zieliński (2 October 2004 – December 2004)
- (Poland) Jacek Zieliński (January 2005 – 1 September 2005)
- (Poland) Dariusz Wdowczyk (2 September 2005 – 13 April 2007)
- (Poland) Jacek Zieliński (14 April 2007 – 2 June 2007)
- (Poland) Jan Urban (3 June 2007 – 14 March 2010)
- (Poland) Stefan Białas (14 March 2010 – 25 May 2010)
- (Poland) Maciej Skorża (1 June 2010 – 30 May 2012)
- (Poland) Jan Urban (30 May 2012 – 19 Dec 2013)
- (Norway) Henning Berg (19 December 2013 – 4 October 2015)
- (Russia) Stanislav Cherchesov (6 October 2015 – 1 June 2016)
- (Albania) (Kosovo) Besnik Hasi (3 June 2016 – 20 September 2016)
- (Serbia) (Poland) Aleksandar Vuković (caretaker)
- (Poland) Jacek Magiera (24 September 2016 – 13 September 2017)
- (Croatia) Romeo Jozak (13 September 2017 – 14 April 2018)
- (Croatia) Dean Klafurić (16 April 2018 – 4 June 2018) (caretaker)
- (Croatia) Dean Klafurić (4 June 2018 – 1 August 2018)
- (Serbia) (Poland) Aleksandar Vuković (1 August 2018 – 13 August 2018) (caretaker)
- (Portugal) Ricardo Sá Pinto (13 August 2018 – 31 March 2019)
- (Serbia) (Poland) Aleksandar Vuković (2 April 2019 – 21 September 2020)
- (Poland) Czesław Michniewicz (21 September 2020 – 25 October 2021)
- (Poland) Marek Gołębiewski (25 October 2021 – 12 December 2021)
- (Serbia) (Poland) Aleksandar Vuković (13 December 2021 – 23 May 2022)
- (Germany) Kosta Runjaić (23 May 2022 – 9 April 2024)
- (Portugal) Gonçalo Feio (10 April 2024 – 25 May 2025)
- (Romania) Edward Iordănescu (12 June 2025 – 31 October 2025)
- (Spain) Iñaki Astiz (31 October 2025 – 19 December 2025) (caretaker)
- (Poland) Marek Papszun (19 December 2025 – present)

== See also ==
- Legia Warsaw II (reserve team)
- Football in Poland
- Polish Army Stadium
- Żyleta

== Bibliography ==
- Kossakowski, Radosław (2021). Hooligans, Ultras, Activists. Polish Football Fandom in Sociological Perspective. Gdańsk. ISBN 978-3-030-56606-7.
