= Jerzy Kopa =

Polish footballer and coach (1943–2022)

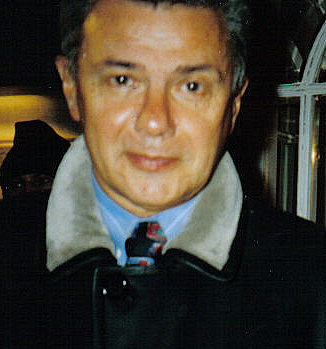

Personal information
- Date of birth: 2 January 1943
- Place of birth: Baranowicze, Reichskommissariat Ostland (now Belarus)
- Date of death: 26 June 2022 (aged 79)
- Place of death: Poznań, Poland
- Position: Midfielder

Youth career
- 1958–1960: Chrobry Szczecin

Senior career*
Years	Team	Apps	(Gls)
1961–1965	AZS Poznań		

Managerial career
- 1970–1972: Arkonia Szczecin
- 1972–1975: Stal Stalowa Wola
- 1975–1976: Szombierki Bytom
- 1976–1979: Lech Poznań
- 1979–1982: Pogoń Szczecin
- 1982–1985: Legia Warsaw
- 1985: Iraklís Thessaloniki
- 1986: Zagłębie Sosnowiec
- 1987: Olimpia Poznań
- 1989–1991: Lech Poznań
- 1998: Lech Poznań
- 1998–1999: Legia Warsaw
- * Club domestic league appearances and goals

Jerzy Kopa (2 January 1943 – 26 June 2022) was a Polish football manager and player.

== Career ==
=== Playing career ===
Kopa played for Chrobry Szczecin and AZS Poznań.

=== Coaching career ===
Jerzy Kopa managed Arkonia Szczecin, Stal Stalowa Wola, Lech Poznań, Pogoń Szczecin, Legia Warsaw, Zagłębie Sosnowiec and Olimpia Poznań.

== Honours ==
Pogoń Szczecin

- I liga: 1980–81

Lech Poznań

- Ekstraklasa: 1989–90
- Polish Super Cup: 1990

Individual

- Polish Coach of the Year: 1981
