= Ryszard Milewski =

Polish footballer (born 1957)

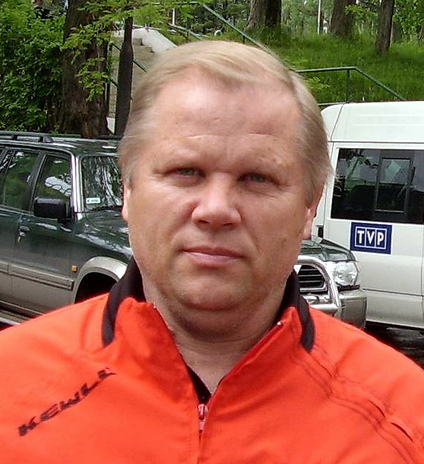

Personal information
- Date of birth: 4 September 1957 (age 69)
- Place of birth: Warsaw, Poland
- Height: 1.78 m (5 ft 10 in)
- Position: Defender

Senior career*
Years	Team	Apps	(Gls)
1975–1984	Legia Warsaw	110	(4)
1985	Motor Lublin	12	(0)
1985–1986	Legia Warsaw	14	(1)
1986–1987	Hutnik Warsaw		
1987–1988	SSG 09 Bergisch Gladbach		
1990–1991	Polska IF Kopernik		
1991–1993	Topkapi IK		
1993–1994	A.A.C. Eagles		

International career
1980–1981	Poland	3	(0)

Managerial career
- 2004–2005: Gwardia Warsaw
- 2007: Polonia Warsaw II
- 2008–2009: ŁKS Łomża
- 2018: Korona Góra Kalwaria
- 2020: Mławianka Mława
- * Club domestic league appearances and goals

Ryszard Milewski (born 4 September 1957) is a Polish professional football manager and former player who played as a defender.

He made three appearances for the Poland national team from 1980 to 1981.

== Honours ==
Legia Warsaw

- Polish Cup: 1979–80, 1980–81
