= Jacek Zieliński (footballer, born 1967) =

Polish footballer and manager

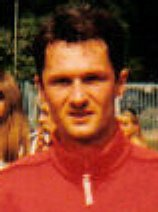

Personal information
- Full name: Jacek Marek Zieliński
- Date of birth: 10 October 1967 (age 59)
- Place of birth: Wierzbica, Radom County, Poland
- Height: 1.84 m (6 ft 1/2 in)
- Position: Defender

Team information
- Current team: Legia Warsaw (board advisor)

Youth career
- 1979–1985: Orzeł Wierzbica

Senior career*
Years	Team	Apps	(Gls)
1985–1991	Igloopol Dębica		
1992–2004	Legia Warsaw	329	(7)

International career
1995–2003	Poland	60	(1)

Managerial career
- 2004–2005: Legia Warsaw (caretaker)
- 2006–2007: Legia Warsaw (assistant)
- 2007: Legia Warsaw (caretaker)
- 2007–2008: Korona Kielce
- 2008–2009: Lechia Gdańsk
- 2009–2012: Poland (assistant)
- 2013–2014: Poland U20
- * Club domestic league appearances and goals

Jacek Marek Zieliński (Polish pronunciation: [ˈjat͡sɛk ˈmarɛk ʑɛˈʎiɲskʲi]; born 10 October 1967) is a Polish football executive, former professional manager and player who played as a defender. He is currently an advisor of Legia Warsaw's board, and was the club's sporting director from December 2021 to December 2024.

In 1999, he won the Polish Footballer of the Year title. He used to work as an assistant manager of the Poland national team.

== Club career ==
Born in Wierzbica, Radom County, Zieliński spent most of his career playing for Legia Warsaw. He played in the quarterfinal of the 1995–96 UEFA Champions League.

== International career ==
Zieliński played for the Poland national team. He made 60 appearances and scored one goal and was a participant at the 2002 FIFA World Cup.

== Career statistics ==
=== International ===
Appearances and goals by national team and year
National team	Year	Apps	Goals
Poland	1995	5	0
Poland	1996	7	0
Poland	1997	7	1
Poland	1998	8	0
Poland	1999	9	0
Poland	2000	8	0
Poland	2001	4	0
Poland	2002	7	0
Poland	2003	5	0
Total		60	1

Scores and results list Poland's goal tally first, score column indicates score after each Zieliński goal.

List of international goals scored by Jacek Zieliński
No.	Date	Venue	Opponent	Score	Result	Competition
1	12 March 1997	Ostrava, Czech Republic	Czech Republic	1–2	1–2	Friendly

== Honours ==
Legia Warsaw

- Ekstraklasa: 1993–94, 1994–95, 2001–02
- Polish Cup: 1993–94, 1994–95, 1996–97

Individual

- Piłka Nożna Polish Footballer of the Year: 1999
