= Makabi Warsaw =

Makabi Warszawa
- Logo of Makabi Warszawa
- Full name: Żydowskie Towarzystwo Gimnastyczno-Sportowe „Makabi” w Warszawie
- Founded: 1915; 111 years ago
- Dissolved: 1939; reactivated 2014
- Ground: Warsaw, Poland
- Owner: Voluntary association
- Chairman: Zelik Weizmann (1915–1919), Jadwiga Rawet and Stenia Eizenberg (1920–1921), Zelman Bychowski (1922–1923), Borys Ferber (1923–1939)
- Website: https://www.facebook.com/MakabiWarszawa/
Home colours	Away colours

Makabi Warszawa, in English Makabi Warsaw, founded in 1915 in Warsaw, Poland was a Polish sports club founded by the Jewish Gymnastic and Sports Association "Maccabi" in Warsaw. It was the largest multi-section Jewish sports club in the Second Polish Republic.

Makabi Warszawa suspended its activities in 1939 after upon the Nazi occupation of Poland during the Holocaust, as German occupation authorities banned all Jewish unions, associations, and sports clubs. It was reactivated in 2014.

== History ==
=== 1915–1940 ===
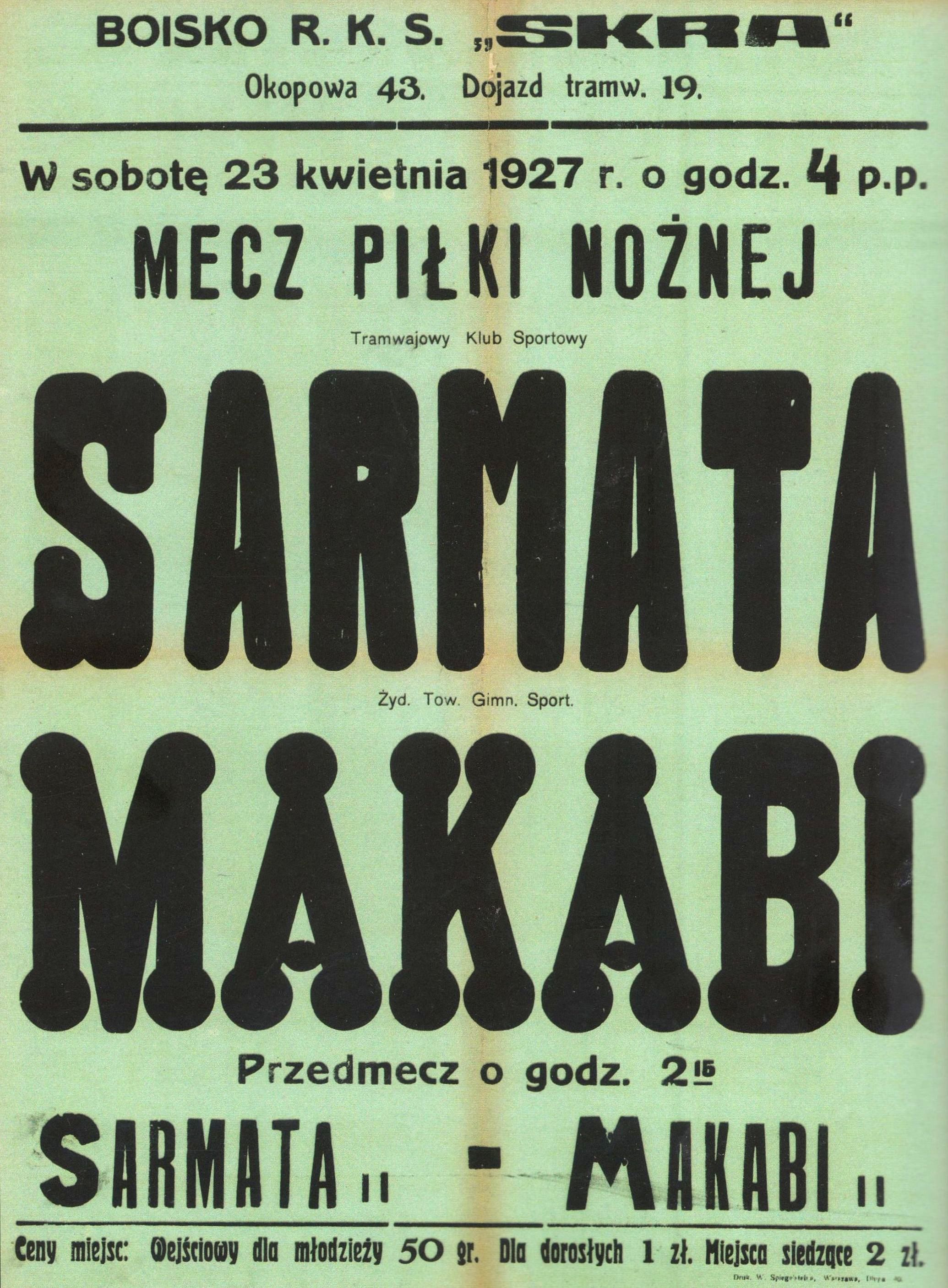
A poster announcing a football match between Sarmata Warsaw and Makabi Warszawa at RKS Skra Stadium on April 23, 1927.

The club was established in 1915. The name "Maccabee" is derived from Judah Maccabee, one of the leaders of the Maccabean Revolt of the Jewish Maccabees against the Seleucids. The goal of the Jewish Gymnastic and Sports Association "Maccabi", established in 1915, was to "rationally educate Jewish youth". Makabi Warszawa provided sports activities to Jewish schools, organized excursions and sports camps, trained sports instructors, and attached great importance to tournaments organized on the occasions of Jewish holidays and Jewish games (the Maccabiah Games). Its members participated in 18 sports, and competed in Polish sports matches.

In the years 1915–1922, Makabi Warszawa's headquarters was at ul. Długa 50, and from 1922 it was in the Simons Passage and had a gym and boxing halls there. It owned, among others playground with an athletics track on Aleja Zieleniecka in Praga-Południe district and its own marina and bathing area on the Vistula River.

Beginning in 1925, the Makabi Warszawa football team had as one of its players Józef Klotz, who in 1922 while a footballer of Jutrzenka Kraków scored the first goal in the history of the Poland national football team. The Makabi Warszawa football team played, at its best, in the second division of the Polish national football league.

In the 1930s, Hakoach Będzin, in the Silesian town of Będzin, opened its own sports field. Visiting Makabi Warszawa played Hakoach during the inauguration ceremony. The game was attended by representatives of sports organizations from across Poland.

In 1932, Makabi Warszawa had about 2,000 members. It was the largest multi-section Jewish sports club in the Second Polish Republic.

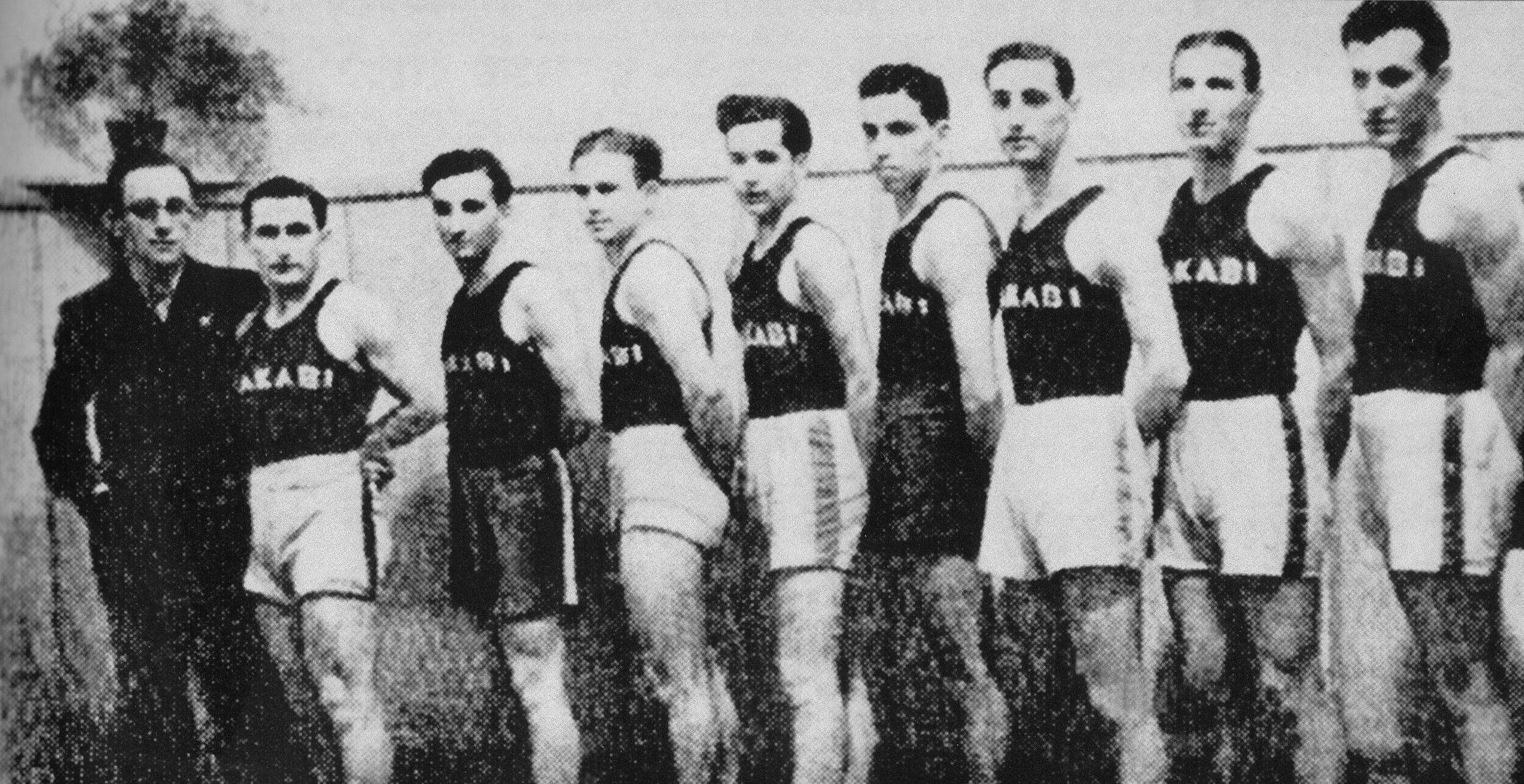
Basketball team of Makabi Warszawa, 1935.

The club was shut down in 1939 upon the Nazi occupation of Poland during the Holocaust, as German occupation authorities banned all Jewish unions, associations, and sports clubs.

=== 2014–present ===
In 2014, Makabi Warszawa was reactivated. It has five sections.

Makabi Warszawa players took part in the 2017 Maccabiah Games in Israel. There, they earned two gold medals and one bronze medal.

== See also ==
- Jutrzenka Kraków
- Lithuanian Sports Club Makabi
- The King of Warsaw (TV series)
- Szapsel Rotholc
