= Józef Klotz =

Polish footballer (1900–1941)

Personal information
- Date of birth: 2 January 1900
- Place of birth: Kraków, Galicia, Austria-Hungary
- Date of death: 1941 (aged 40–41)
- Place of death: Warsaw Ghetto, General Government
- Position: Forward

Youth career
- 1910–1912: Jutrzenka Kraków

Senior career*
Years	Team	Apps	(Gls)
1912–1925	Jutrzenka Kraków		
1925–1929	Makabi Warsaw		

International career
1922	Poland	2	(1)
- * Club domestic league appearances and goals

Józef Klotz (2 January 1900 – 1941) was a Jewish Polish footballer who played as a forward. He scored the first ever goal for the Poland national team. He was killed by the Nazis in the Warsaw Ghetto in 1941.

== Biography ==
Klotz was born in Kraków, southern Poland, and was Jewish. His father was a shoemaker.

He scored the first ever goal for the Poland national team. He scored it against Sweden in Stockholm in May 1922, in the team's third international match.

Klotz played for two clubs. He played first for Jutrzenka Kraków, which he joined as a youth team player and played for from 1912 to 1925, and then for Makabi Warsaw from 1925 to 1929 (both teams were Jewish minority teams). He retired as a player in 1930.

He was imprisoned in the Warsaw Ghetto in 1940. He was murdered there by the Germans in 1941.

In 2019, Klotz was honored by the Polish Football Association.

== See also ==
- List of select Jewish football (association; soccer) players

== Sources ==
- Andrzej Gowarzewski "FUJI Football Encyclopedia – History of the Polish National Team (1) – White and Red"; GiA Katowice 1991
