= Zygmunt Krumholz =

Polish footballer

Personal information
- Date of birth: 1 March 1903
- Place of birth: Czernichów, Austria-Hungary
- Date of death: 20 July 1947 (aged 44)
- Place of death: Sambir, Ukraine
- Height: 1.70 m (5 ft 7 in)
- Position: Forward

Senior career*
Years	Team	Apps	(Gls)
1920–1924	Jutrzenka Kraków		
1924	Samson Tarnów		
1925–1927	Jutrzenka Kraków		
1928–1929	Hasmonea Lwów		
1931–1935	Makkabi Kraków		

International career
1922	Poland	1	(0)
- * Club domestic league appearances and goals

Zygmunt Krumholz (1 March 1903 – 20 July 1947) was a Polish footballer who played as a forward.

He made one appearance for the Poland national team in 1922.
