= Poland national football team =

Men's association football team

Poland
- Nickname(s): Biało-Czerwoni (The White-Reds); Orły (The Eagles)
- Association: Polski Związek Piłki Nożnej (PZPN)
- Confederation: UEFA (Europe)
- Head coach: Jan Urban
- Captain: Robert Lewandowski
- Most caps: Robert Lewandowski (172)
- Top scorer: Robert Lewandowski (92)
- Home stadium: National Stadium; Silesian Stadium
- FIFA code: POL
First colours	Second colours

FIFA ranking
- Current: 38 ▼1 (18 November 2026)
- Highest: 5 (August 2017)
- Lowest: 78 (November 2013)

First international
- Hungary 1–0 Poland (Budapest, Hungary; 18 December 1921)

Biggest win
- Poland 10–0 San Marino (Kielce, Poland; 1 April 2009)

Biggest defeat
- Denmark 8–0 Poland (Copenhagen, Denmark; 26 June 1948)

World Cup
- Appearances: 9 (first in 1938)
- Best result: Third place (1974, 1982)

European Championship
- Appearances: 5 (first in 2008)
- Best result: Quarter-finals (2016)

Olympic Games
- Appearances: 6 (first in 1936)
- Best result: Champions (1972)
Medal record
Men's football
World Cup
Bronze medal – third place	1974 West Germany	Team
Bronze medal – third place	1982 Spain	Team
Olympic Games
Gold medal – first place	1972 West Germany	Team
Silver medal – second place	1976 Canada	Team

The Poland national football team (Polish: Reprezentacja Polski w piłce nożnej) represents Poland in men's international football competitions since their first match in 1921. It is governed by the Polish Football Association (PZPN), the governing body for football in Poland. They are known by the nicknames "The White-Reds" and "The Eagles", symbolized by their coat of arms featuring a white eagle on a red background. The team reached their peak World Ranking of 5th in 2017. Poland's home ground is the Kazimierz Górski National Stadium in Warsaw.

Poland has competed in nine FIFA World Cups, with their first appearance being in 1938, where they were eliminated by Brazil. The country's best result was third place, which Poland achieved in 1974 and 1982; this era is regarded as the golden era of Polish international football. Individually, Grzegorz Lato won the Golden Boot at the 1974 FIFA World Cup having scored seven goals. The country's most recent result at the event was reaching round of 16 at the 2022 FIFA World Cup.

At the UEFA European Championship, Poland's best result was a quarter-finals appearance at the 2016 tournament before losing to eventual champions Portugal. Overall, they have competed in five European Championship since their debut in 2008. They were co-hosts of the 2012 edition, along with Ukraine.

Overall, Poland's best ever result at an international football tournament was gold medal won at the 1972 Munich Olympics, along with the silver medal at the 1976 Montreal Olympics.

== History ==
=== Before independence ===
The first Polish football clubs were Lechia Lwów (1903), Czarni Lwów (1903), Pogoń Lwów (1904), KS Cracovia (1906) and Wisła Kraków (1906). The Polish national federation, called the Polish Football Union (Polski Związek Piłki Nożnej, PZPN), was founded on 20 December 1919, in Kraków when 31 delegates elected Edward Cetnarowski as the first president. The PZPN joined FIFA in 1923 and UEFA in 1955.

In a similar fashion to other European states, football appeared in Poland in the late 19th century. In 1888, Prof. Henryk Jordan, a court physician of the Habsburgs and the pioneer of sports in Poland, opened a sports park in Kraków's Błonia, a large open space surrounding the demolished city walls of that town. The park, along with the Sokół society founded in 1867, became the main centres to promote sports and healthy living in Poland. It was Jordan who began promoting football as a healthy sport in the open air; some sources also credit him with bringing the first football to Poland from his travels to Brunswick in 1890. Other source mentions Dr. Edmund Cenar as the one to bring the first ball and the one to translate The Cambridge Rules and parts of the International Football Association Board regulations to Polish language.

On 14 July 1894, during the Second Sokół Jamboree in Lwów at the General National Exhibition, a short football match was played between the Sokół members of Lwów and those from Kraków. It lasted only six minutes and was seen as a curiosity rather than a potentially popular sport. Nevertheless, it was the first recorded football match in Polish history. (Note: In fact, there was a previous meeting mentioned by the press in Kraków in 1892, though no details are known.) The Lwów team won after Włodzimierz Chomicki scored the only goal - the first known goal in Polish history.

This match precipitated the popularity of the new sport in Poland. Initially the rules and regulations were very simplified, with the size of the field and the ball varying greatly. Despite being discouraged by many educational societies and the state authorities, the new sport gained extreme popularity among pupils of various gymnasiums in Galicia. The first football teams were formed and in 1903–1904, four Lwów-based gymnasiums formed their own sport clubs: the IV Gymnasium for Boys formed a club later renamed to Pogoń Lwów, while the pupils of the I and II State Schools formed the Sława Lwów club, later renamed to Czarni Lwów. In the same season the Lechia Lwów was also formed. It is uncertain which of the clubs was created first as they were initially poorly organised; however, the Czarni Lwów are usually credited as being the first Polish professional football team. The following year, the popularity of the sport spread to nearby Rzeszów where Resovia Rzeszów was formed, while in the German-held part of Poland, the 1. FC Katowice and Warta Poznań were formed.

On 6 June 1906, a representation of Lwów youth came to Kraków for a repeat match, this time composed of two already organised teams, the Czarni and the team of the IV Gymnasium. Kraków's representation was beaten in both meetings, 4–0 and 2–0 respectively. That summer the Buffalo Bill Wild West Show set up camp at Kraków's Błonia, right outside of the traditional playground area and Jordan's garden. On 5 August 1906 the team of the Kraków-based Jan Sobieski Gymnasium played a match against the British and American members of Buffalo Bill's troupe, winning 1–0. The only goal scored by Stanisław Szeligowski was also the first goal scored by a Polish team in an international meeting. The success led to the popularisation of football in Kraków and to creation of the first Kraków-based professional football team, KS Cracovia – initially composed primarily of students of the Jan Sobieski Gymnasium. By the autumn of that year there were already 16 teams in Kraków, including Wisła Kraków. In 1911, a Kraków-based Union of Polish Football for Galicia was formed and entered the Austrian Football Association. The union inspired the creation of a number of teams.

After the outbreak of World War I, most of the Galician football players, many of them members of either Strzelec or Sokół, joined Piłsudski's Polish Legions. The unit, fighting alongside the Austro-Hungarian Army, fought mostly in various parts of Russian-held Poland, which led to popularisation of the new sport in other parts of partitioned Poland. Eventually, Poland regained its independence in 1918.

=== 1919–1939 ===
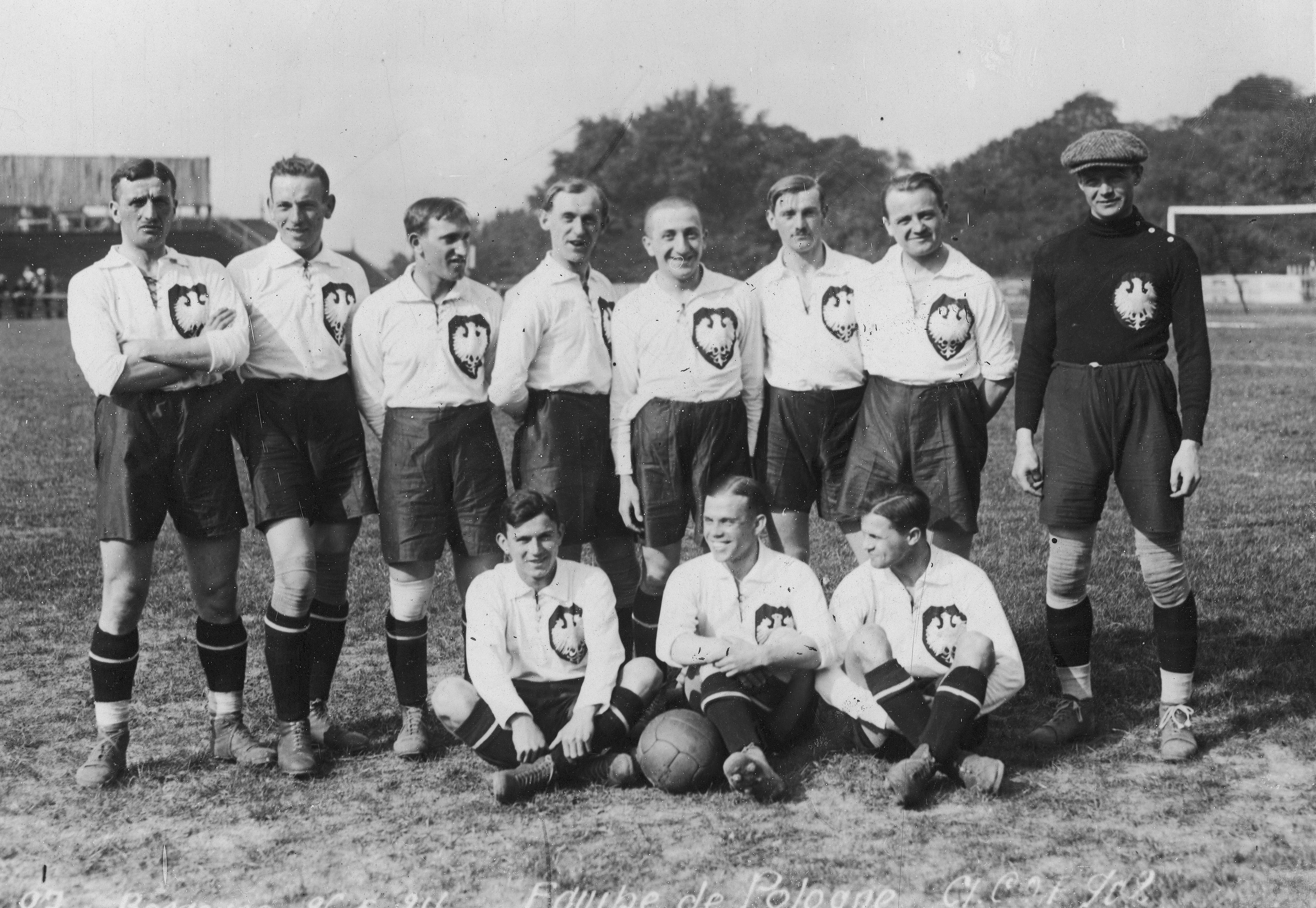
Poland national team, 1924

The first football federation was established on 25 June 1911 in Lwów as the Polish Football Union (Związek Polski Piłki Nożnej). After World War I, members of PFU established the Polish Football Federation (Polski Związek Piłki Nożnej) in Warsaw on 20 December 1919. Two years later, they appointed Hungarian-born Jesza Poszony as the first coach of the Polish national team.

Poland played its first official international match on 18 December 1921 in Budapest, losing to Hungary 1–0. Their first international victory came on 28 May 1922 when they took on Sweden in Stockholm and beat them 2–1. Józef Klotz scored the first-ever goal for the national football team in that game. Poland qualified for their first World Cup in 1937 when they beat Yugoslavia 4–0 and lost 1–0 in the two qualifying matches and ensured their place in the 1938 World Cup in France.

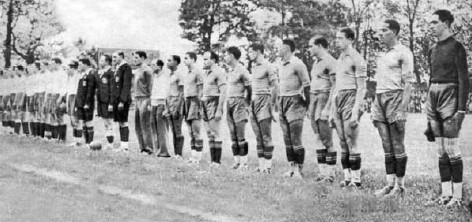
Poland team that played Brazil at the 1938 FIFA World Cup

During their World Cup debut, Poland played Brazil and sent them to extra time, only to lose 6–5. Ernest Wilimowski, who played for Ruch Chorzów at the time, scored four of Poland's five goals.

Poland played what would be their last international match before the outbreak of World War II against Hungary, the runners-up in the 1938 World Cup. Poland defeated Hungary 4–2.

=== 1939–1945 ===
When the Wehrmacht invaded Poland in September 1939, all Polish institutions and associations were dissolved, including the Polish Football Association PZPN. The German occupying forces forbade Poles to organise football matches. Consequently, there was no national team.

Nine former national players were murdered by the German occupying forces. Three of them were killed in Auschwitz: Marian Einbacher, Adam Knioła (both Warta Poznań) and Antoni Łyko (Wisła Kraków). Stefan Fryc (Cracovia) and Bronisław Makowski (Wisła Kraków), who were both active in the resistance, were killed in mass shootings. Four Jewish players were murdered in Jewish ghettos: Józef Klotz, Zygmunt Krumholz (both Jutrzenka Kraków), Leon Sperling (Cracovia) and Zygmunt Steuermann (Hasmonea Lwów), brother of actress and Hollywood screenwriter Salka Viertel.

=== 1946–1974 ===
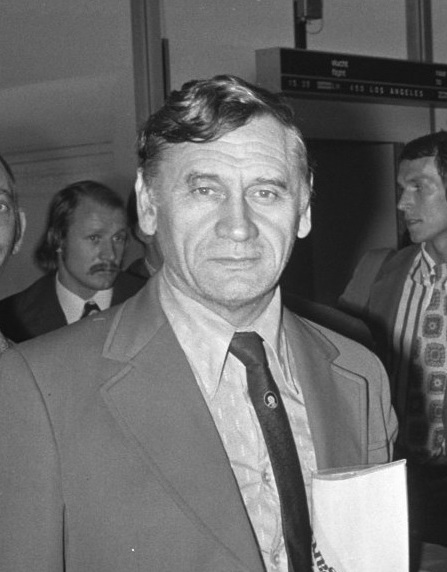
Kazimierz Górski was head coach of the national team between 1971 and 1976

On 11 June 1946, following the aftermath of World War II, Poland played their first international friendly match, a 3–1 defeat against Norway in Oslo. Poland's biggest success in the early years after the war was their victory against one of Europe's best at the time, Czechoslovakia. Poland defeated their southern neighbors 3–1.

Poland suffered the worst defeat in the team's history on 26 April 1948 with a 0–8 loss to Denmark in Copenhagen. 15 years later, they posted their second highest-ever victory in Szczecin when they defeated Norway 9–0 on 4 September 1963. The game marked the debut for Włodzimierz Lubański, who scored one goal in the game. Lubański became the all-time top scorer for Poland while playing from 1963 to 1980, scoring 48 goals in 75 appearances, a record which stood for 37 years. The game remained their highest victory until the score was surpassed on 1 April 2009, when Poland defeated San Marino 10–0.

=== 1974–1986 ===
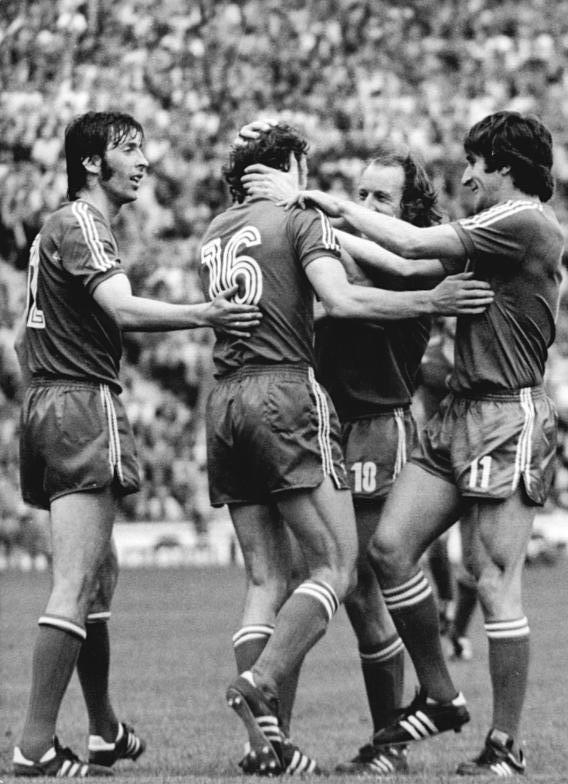
Poland celebrates a victory over Brazil in the 1974 World Cup

For 1974 World Cup qualification, Poland qualified and eliminated England, who missed out on the World Cup for the first time since 1946. For Poland themselves, this was their first appearance since 1938.

In their opening match of the 1974 World Cup, Poland met Argentina. Within eight minutes Poland were up 2–0 as Grzegorz Lato opened the scoring in the seventh minute and just a minute later Andrzej Szarmach doubled the lead. In the 60th minute, Argentina cut the lead in half when Ramon Heredia scored. Two minutes later, however, Lato scored his second, which turned out to be the winning goal as Carlos Babington gave Argentina their second in the 66th. Poland won 3–2.

Poland beat Haiti 7–0 in their second game, with a hat-trick from Szarmach and two goals from Lato. In their final match of the group stage, Poland met Italy. Poland were already through to the second round but needed at least a draw to win the group. Poland defeated Italy 2–1, finishing at the top of the group. In the second round, Poland won 1–0 against Sweden, who had not conceded any goals in their first three matches. Lato scored the only goal of the game. In the next game, Yugoslavia conceded a penalty from Poland in the 24th minute, and Stanislav Karasi tied it up for Yugoslavia in the 43rd. Lato scored the winning goal.

Poland faced hosts West Germany in the rain; Gerd Müller scored the winning goal in the 76th minute for West Germany. The Poles eventually defeated Brazil in the third place match.

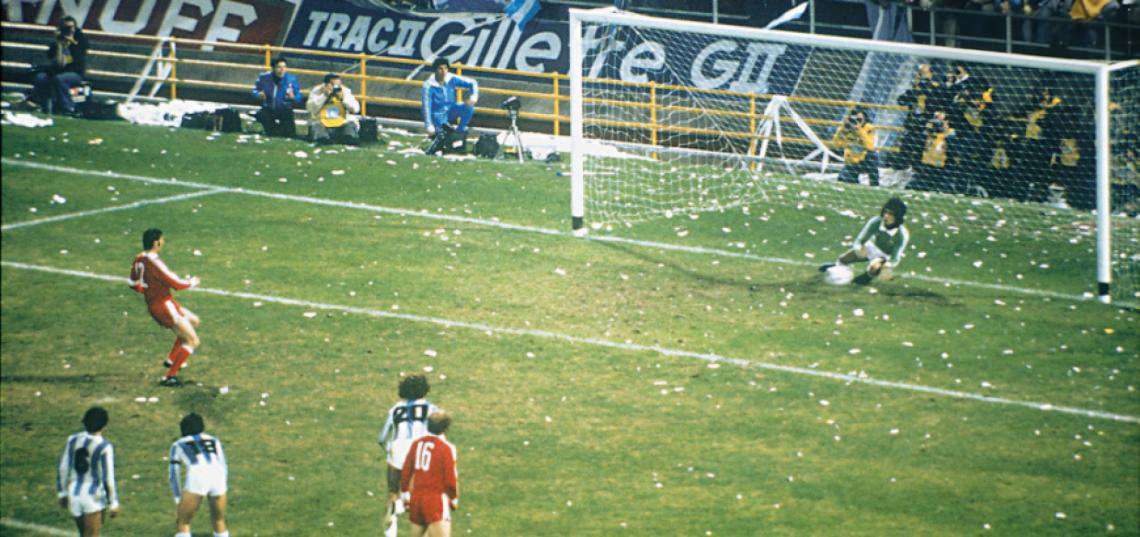
Poland v Argentina in the 1978 World Cup

In 1978 World Cup qualifying, Poland denied Portugal their second World Cup appearance and their first in 12 years. In the World Cup, Grzegorz Lato scored the only goal against African side Tunisia in the second match. In the final first-round match Poland met Mexico, with a 3–1 win.

In the second round, Poland met three South American teams. In 1974, Poland had played and won against both Argentina and Brazil; both teams would get their revenge this time around. First, Argentina beat the Poles 2–0 with two goals from tournament top scorer Mario Kempes. Poland then defeated Peru 1–0 with a goal from Andrzej Szarmach. In Poland's last match of this World Cup, Brazil opened the scoring in the 12th minute on a goal from Nelinho. Even though Lato equalized one minute before half-time, it was not to be for Poland: two goals from Roberto Dinamite in the 57th and 62nd minutes wrapped up a 3–1 win for Brazil.

On 29 November 1980, a dispute between players and technical staff began at a hotel in Warsaw, ending in the Okęcie Airport. Following the incident, several players of the Poland national team were banned from international duty, and Ryszard Kulesza resigned as head coach of the team. At the 1982 FIFA World Cup, Poland were drawn in a group with Italy, Cameroon and Peru. The first two games were consecutive 0–0 draws with Italy and Cameroon, but the final group game of the first round ended in a 5–1 win for Poland, meaning they would advance to the second round as group winners.

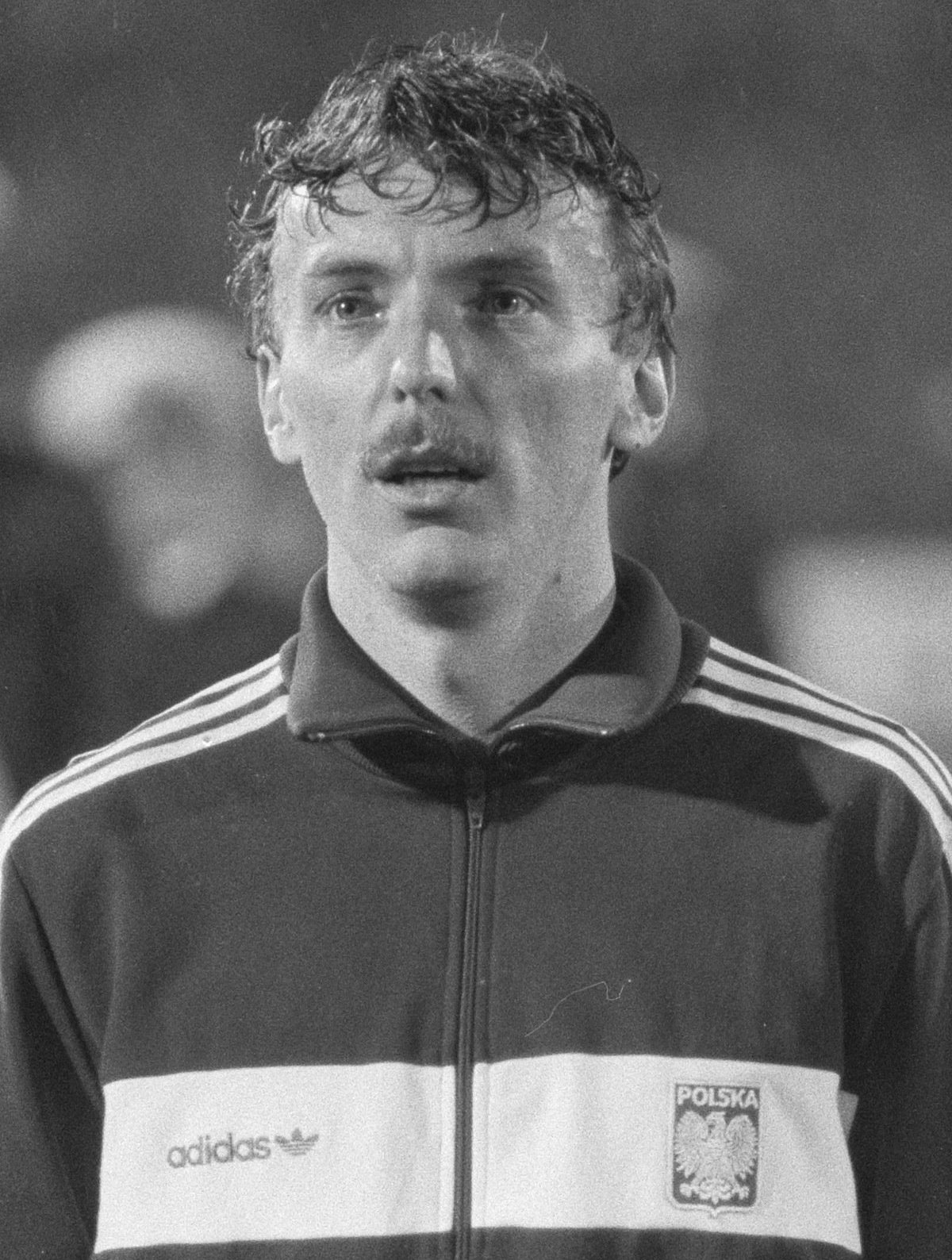
Zbigniew Boniek, top scorer for Poland in the 1982 World Cup

In the first game of the second round, Poland beat Belgium 3–0 with a hat-trick from Boniek securing a classic performance in the match, though the player would receive a yellow card in the following game. Nevertheless, Poland advanced as group winners to the knockout stage. However, Poland would eventually be stopped in the semi-finals, losing 0–2 to Italy; however, they also secured a place in the third place play-off, where Poland beat France 3–2, with the game also being regarded as "the end of the golden era of Polish football".

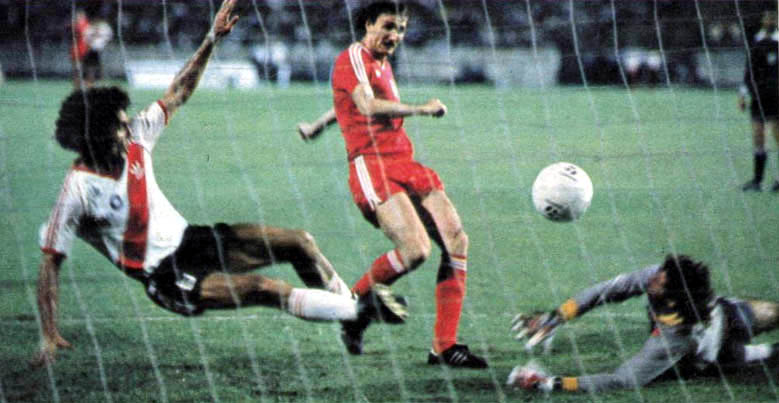
Poland scoring v River Plate during their tour on Argentina, February 1986

In 1986 FIFA World Cup qualifying, Poland finished top of their qualifying group, with 3 wins, 2 draws and 1 defeat. Poland's biggest win of the qualifying phase was a 4–1 win over Greece, while Poland's biggest defeat was a 0–2 defeat to Belgium.

At the 1986 World Cup, Poland were drawn into a group with England, Morocco and Portugal. The first match was a 0–0 draw against Morocco; in the second match, Poland beat Portugal 1–0. In the final group game, they lost 0–3 to England, but Poland still advanced into the knockout stage as a result of Morocco winning 3–1 over Portugal. In the round of sixteen, Poland were eliminated after suffering a 4–0 defeat to Brazil.

=== 1986–2001 ===
After the "Golden Era" from the 1970s and 1980s, Poland suffered a severe drought in international football; they did not qualify for three consecutive editions of the FIFA World Cup, from 1990 to 1998.

In 1990 World Cup qualifying, Poland finished third in the qualifying group, behind Sweden and England. They finished on 5 points with two wins, one draw and three defeats. They began qualifying for the 1990 edition with a 1–0 win over Albania, before losing to Sweden (2–1) and England (3–0). Poland then drew 0–0 with England, lost to Sweden 2–0 and beat Albania 2–1 in their final game, but were 4 points behind England, thus failing to qualify.

In 1992 Poland won the Silver medal in Barcelona, losing to Spain.

In 1994 World Cup qualifying, Poland finished fourth in the qualifying group, behind Norway, the Netherlands and England. Poland began qualifying with a 1–0 win over Turkey, followed by a 2–2 draw with the Netherlands, a 1–0 win over San Marino, and a 3–0 win in the reverse fixture. Afterwards, Poland drew 1–1 with England, before falling to a 0–3 defeat in the reverse fixture. Poland would then go on to suffer consecutive defeats, losing 1–0 and 3–0 to Norway, followed by a 2–1 defeat to Turkey and a 1–3 defeat to the Netherlands in the final fixture.

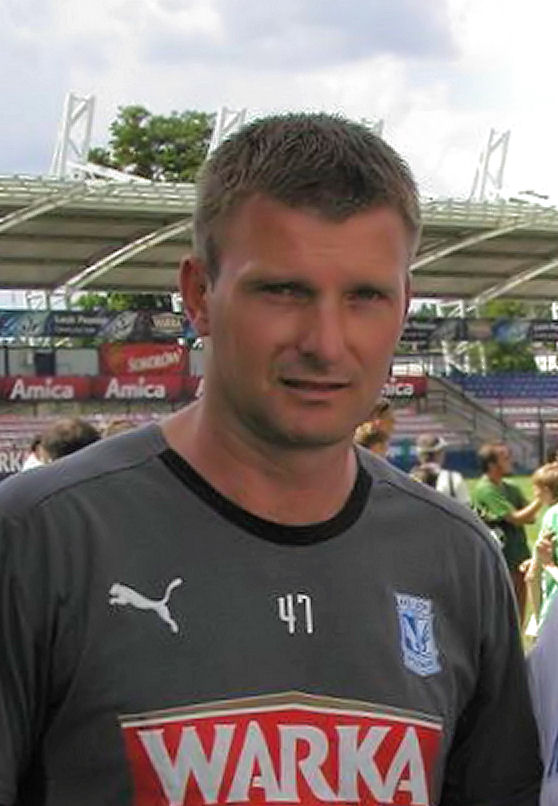
Andrzej Juskowiak; top goalscorer for Poland in Euro 1996 qualifying (7 goals) and 1998 World Cup qualifying (3 goals)

In Euro 1996 qualifying, Poland drew a qualifying group with Romania, France, Slovakia, Israel and Azerbaijan. Poland lost 2–1 to Israel in the first game, and then recorded a 1–0 win over Azerbaijan and a 0–0 draw with France. Later, Poland lost 2–1 to Romania and beat Israel 4–3 and Slovakia 5–0 before consecutive draws with France (1–1) and Romania (0–0). Poland lost 4–1 to Slovakia in the penultimate qualifying game, and drew 0–0 with Azerbaijan in the final group game.

In 1998 World Cup qualifying, Poland finished third behind England and Italy. They began qualifying with a 2–1 loss to England before beating Moldova (2–1) and drawing 0–0 with Italy. Afterwards, they suffered successive defeats to Italy (3–0) and England (0–2). They won the next two games with scores of 4–1 over Georgia and 3–0 over Moldova, with Andrzej Juskowiak scoring a hat-trick against the latter. The final game was against Georgia, with Poland losing 0–3.

During UEFA Euro 2000 qualifying, Poland was drawn in a group with England, Sweden, Bulgaria and Luxembourg. Poland finished third, tied with England in points earned, but failed to qualify due to goal difference.

=== 2001–2006 ===
Poland qualified for the 2002 World Cup, their first appearance at the World Cup since 1986. Poland's biggest win overall in the qualifying phase was a 4–0 win over Armenia, while their biggest defeat was a 4–1 defeat to Belarus.

The Polish drew a group featuring hosts South Korea, the United States and Portugal. The first match was played against the hosts on 4 June, with Poland losing 2–0. The second game was against Portugal on 10 June, which Poland lost 4–0, confirming their early elimination. Poland then played the United States in the final group game on 14 June, winning 3–1; however, the U.S. advanced to the quarter-finals after defeating Mexico in the round of 16. Despite the win, Poland finished last in the group, with a goal difference of –4 and 3 points.

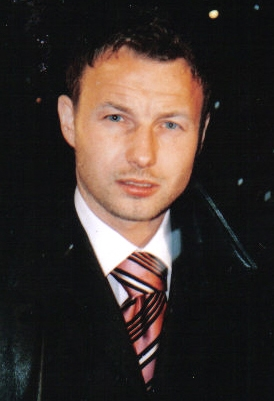
Tomasz Frankowski; top goalscorer during Poland's 2006 World Cup qualifying campaign, with 7 goals

Poland's qualifying for the 2006 FIFA World Cup saw eight wins and two defeats. They finished behind England in the qualifying group; but as a result of being the second best second-placed team in the play-offs, they qualified automatically for the finals in Germany. The biggest win of the qualifying phase for Poland was an 8–0 victory over Azerbaijan, in which Tomasz Frankowski scored a hat-trick. The biggest defeat of the qualifying phase for Poland were two defeats against England, losing both home and away games by a scoreline of 1–2.

At the 2006 World Cup, Poland drew Germany, Ecuador and Costa Rica in Group A. Despite high hopes from the Polish press, media and fans, Poland's campaign at the World Cup was seen as an underachievement; as Poland lost two and won one game, finishing third in the group. Poland's first match was a 2–0 defeat to Ecuador, followed by a 1–0 defeat to Germany, with Oliver Neuville scoring a stoppage time winning goal; the defeat to Germany, following Ecuador's 3–0 win over Costa Rica, officially ended Poland's chances of advancing further than the group stage. The third and final group game saw Poland defeat Costa Rica 2–1, with Bartosz Bosacki getting on the scoresheet twice.

=== 2008 ===
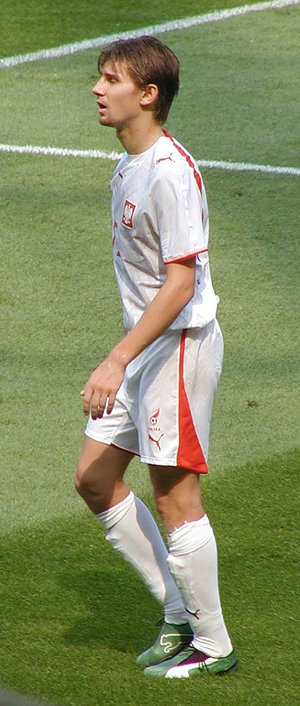
Ebi Smolarek, who scored 9 goals during the qualifying phase

In Euro 2008 qualifying, Poland were drawn into a group with Portugal, Serbia, Finland, Belgium, Kazakhstan, Armenia and Azerbaijan. Poland's campaign began in uncomfortable fashion, suffering a 1–3 defeat to Finland on 2 September 2006 and then drawing 1–1 with Serbia on 6 September. In the third match, on 7 October, Poland won 1–0 over Kazakhstan, with Ebi Smolarek scoring the goal. On 11 October, Poland beat Portugal 2–1, with Smolarek scoring the two goals. Poland beat Belgium 1–0 on 15 November. On 24 March 2007, Poland beat Azerbaijan 5–0, and on 28 March beat Armenia 1–0. On 2 June, they beat Azerbaijan 3–1, with Smolarek and Krzynówek (2) scoring. On 6 June, Poland lost 1–0 to Armenia, on 8 September drew 2–2 with Portugal, and on 12 September drew 0–0 with Finland. On 13 October, Poland beat Kazakhstan 3–1 with a hat-trick from Smolarek. They beat Belgium 2–0 with two goals from Smolarek on 17 November and drew 2–2 with Serbia in the final qualifying game on the 21st, thus qualifying for the tournament as the 1st place team in the qualifying group following Portugal's 0–0 draw with Finland. This was Poland's first ever Euro appearance.

At UEFA Euro 2008, they were drawn in Group B, with Germany, Austria and Croatia. Germany and Poland played on 8 June at the Hypo-Arena in Klagenfurt, Austria, with Poland losing 2–0 with two goals from Lukas Podolski. In the second game, Poland drew 1–1 with Austria, taking the lead through Brazil-born Roger Guerreiro, before conceding in the third minute of stoppage time following a controversial penalty. Poland lost 1–0 in the final group game was against Croatia and finished bottom of the group.

=== 2010 ===
In 2010 FIFA World Cup qualifying, Poland were drawn in a group with Slovakia, Slovenia, the Czech Republic, Northern Ireland and San Marino. Poland finished fifth in the group, just above San Marino, with 11 points. Poland began the campaign with a 1–1 draw against Slovenia on 6 September 2008. On 10 October, Poland beat San Marino 2–0. On 11 October, they won 2–1 against the Czech Republic. After these wins, Poland lost consecutive matches against Slovakia (2–1) and Northern Ireland (3–2). Poland then recorded their biggest ever win with a scoreline of 10–0 against San Marino. Six different players scored in the win on 1 April 2009. In the last rounds of qualifying, Poland drew 1–1 with Northern Ireland and lost to Slovenia. Poland then ended the campaign with consecutive losses to the Czech Republic and Slovakia.

=== 2012 ===
On 18 April 2007, in Cardiff, Poland and Ukraine were selected to host UEFA Euro 2012 by the UEFA Executive Committee. The bid defeated others from Italy, Greece, Turkey, and a joint bid by Croatia and Hungary. Poland and Ukraine's bid became the third successful joint-bid made to host the UEFA European Championship, after the Netherlands and Belgium in 2000, and Austria and Switzerland in 2008.

Poland were drawn into Group A, with Greece, Russia and the Czech Republic. On 8 June, the opening match played between Poland and Greece at the National Stadium in Warsaw ended 1–1, with Poland taking the lead in the 17th minute through Robert Lewandowski before Greece equalized in the second half through Dimitris Salpingidis in the 51st minute. Both teams went down to 10 men during the game. Poland's next game was on 12 June, again played at the National Stadium in Warsaw, with the game against Russia finishing 1–1. Russia took the lead through Alan Dzagoev in the 37th minute before Poland equalized through Błaszczykowski in the 57th minute. Poland's final game was played against the Czech Republic on 16 June at the Municipal Stadium, in Wrocław, where Poland lost 1–0 following a goal from Petr Jiráček. Poland finished bottom of the group with two points, prompting coach Franciszek Smuda to resign following the elimination.

=== 2014–2021 ===
Poland was drawn in Group H of 2014 FIFA World Cup qualifying, with England, Ukraine, Montenegro, Moldova and San Marino.

On 7 September, Poland's first qualifying match ended in a 2–2 draw with Montenegro, with goals from Błaszczykowski and Mierzejewski. On 11 September, they beat Moldova 2–0 with goals from Błaszczykowski and Wawrzyniak. On 17 October, Poland drew 1–1 with England, with Glik scoring the equalizing goal. On 22 March 2013, Poland lost 3–1 to Ukraine, conceding two goals in the first seven minutes alone, with Piszczek scoring Poland's only goal. On 26 March, Poland beat San Marino 5–0, with a brace from Lewandowski, and goals from Piszczek, Teodorczyk and Kosecki. On 6 September, Poland drew 1–1 with Montenegro, with Lewandowski scoring the equalizing goal only five minutes after Poland initially conceded. On 10 September, they beat San Marino 5–1, with a brace from Zieliński, and goals from Błaszczykowski, Sobota and Mierzejewski. However, Poland lost the last two games against Ukraine and England, 1–0 and 2–0, respectively.

In UEFA Euro 2016 qualifying, Poland were drawn in Group D, with Germany, Scotland, the Republic of Ireland, Georgia and Gibraltar.

On 11 October 2014, Poland beat 2014 World Cup champions Germany 2–0. Three days later, Poland drew 2–2 with Scotland. They drew 1–1 with the Republic of Ireland in March 2015 after conceding a goal from Shane Long in stoppage time. By October, they beat the Republic of Ireland to score enough points for securing automatic qualification for the Euros.

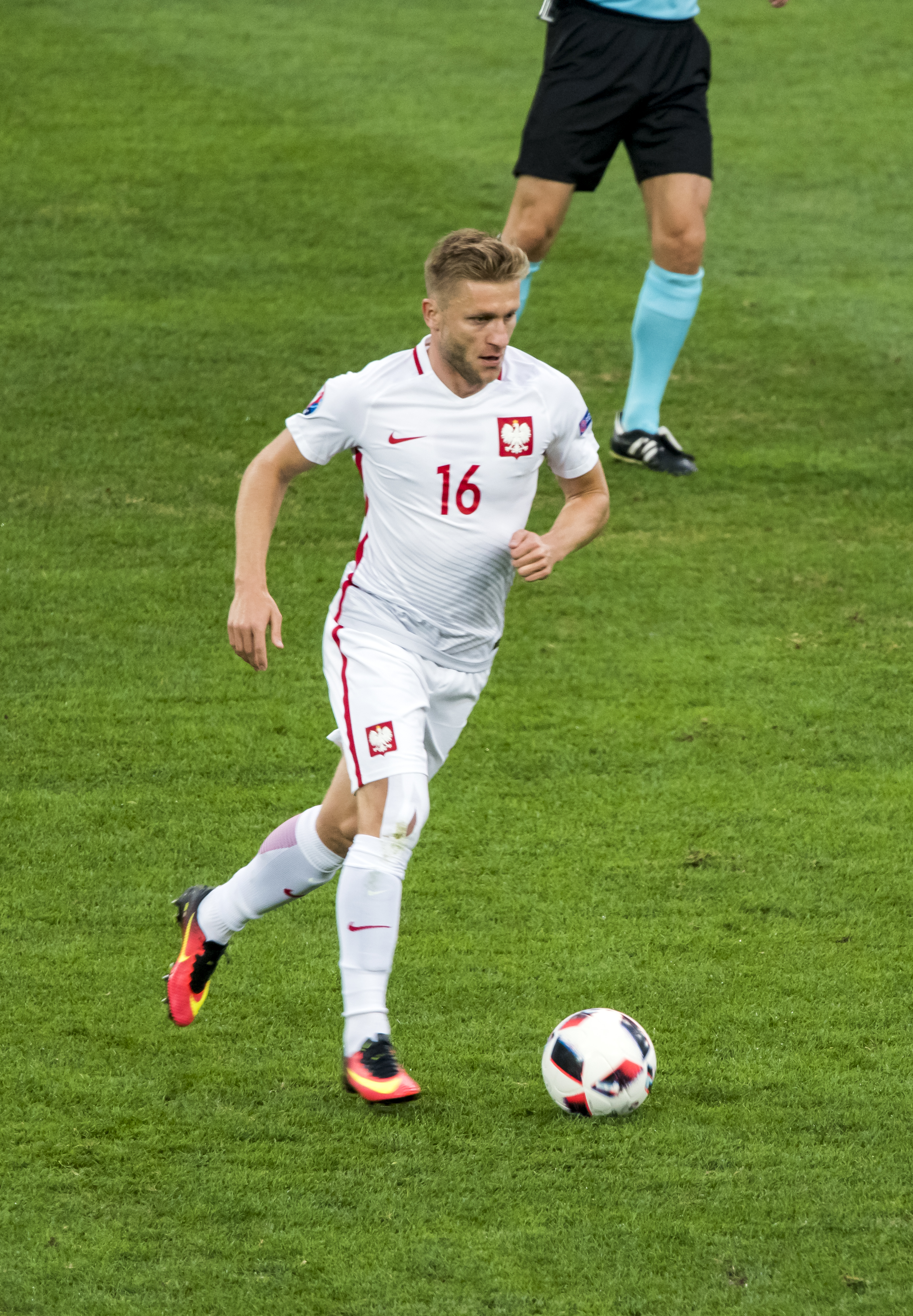
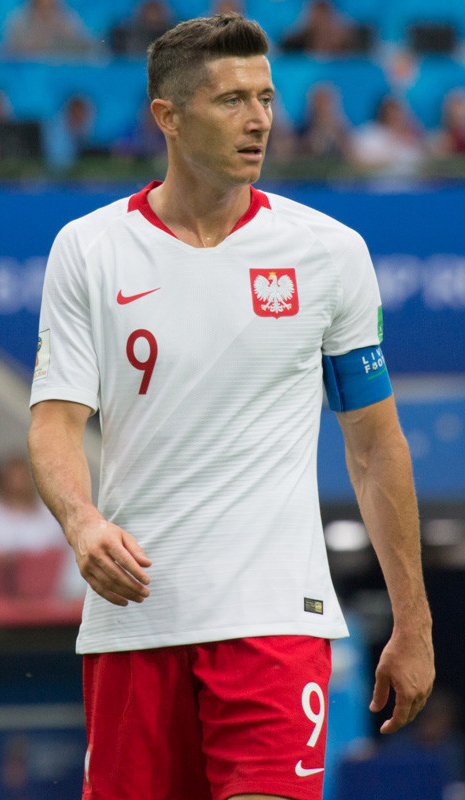
(Left): Jakub Błaszczykowski playing for Poland during the Euro 2016 quarter-final match with Portugal, on 30 June 2016; (right): Robert Lewandowski, who finished the 2018 FIFA World Cup qualifying campaign with 16 goals; breaking the European qualifying record for goals scored, as well as becoming all-time top goalscorer for Poland.

At UEFA Euro 2016, Poland were drawn in Group C, with Germany, Northern Ireland and Ukraine.

Poland's first match was with Northern Ireland on 12 June at the Stade de Nice in Nice; they won the game 1–0 with a goal from Arkadiusz Milik in the 51st minute. The next match was with Germany at the Stade de France in Saint-Denis on 16 June; with the finishing 0–0. Poland's final group game was with Ukraine on 21 June, at the Stade Vélodrome in Marseille, a game they won 1–0 with a goal from Jakub Błaszczykowski. In the round of sixteen, Poland were drawn to play Switzerland on 25 June at the Stade Geoffroy-Guichard in Saint-Étienne. Poland took the lead through a goal from Błaszczykowski, but conceded a bicycle kick from Xherdan Shaqiri in the 82nd minute, finishing the game 1–1 in regular time. Poland then beat Switzerland in a penalty shootout, 5–4. Poland then faced Portugal in the quarter-finals; another penalty shootout occurred after a 1–1 draw. Poland lost the shootout 5–3.

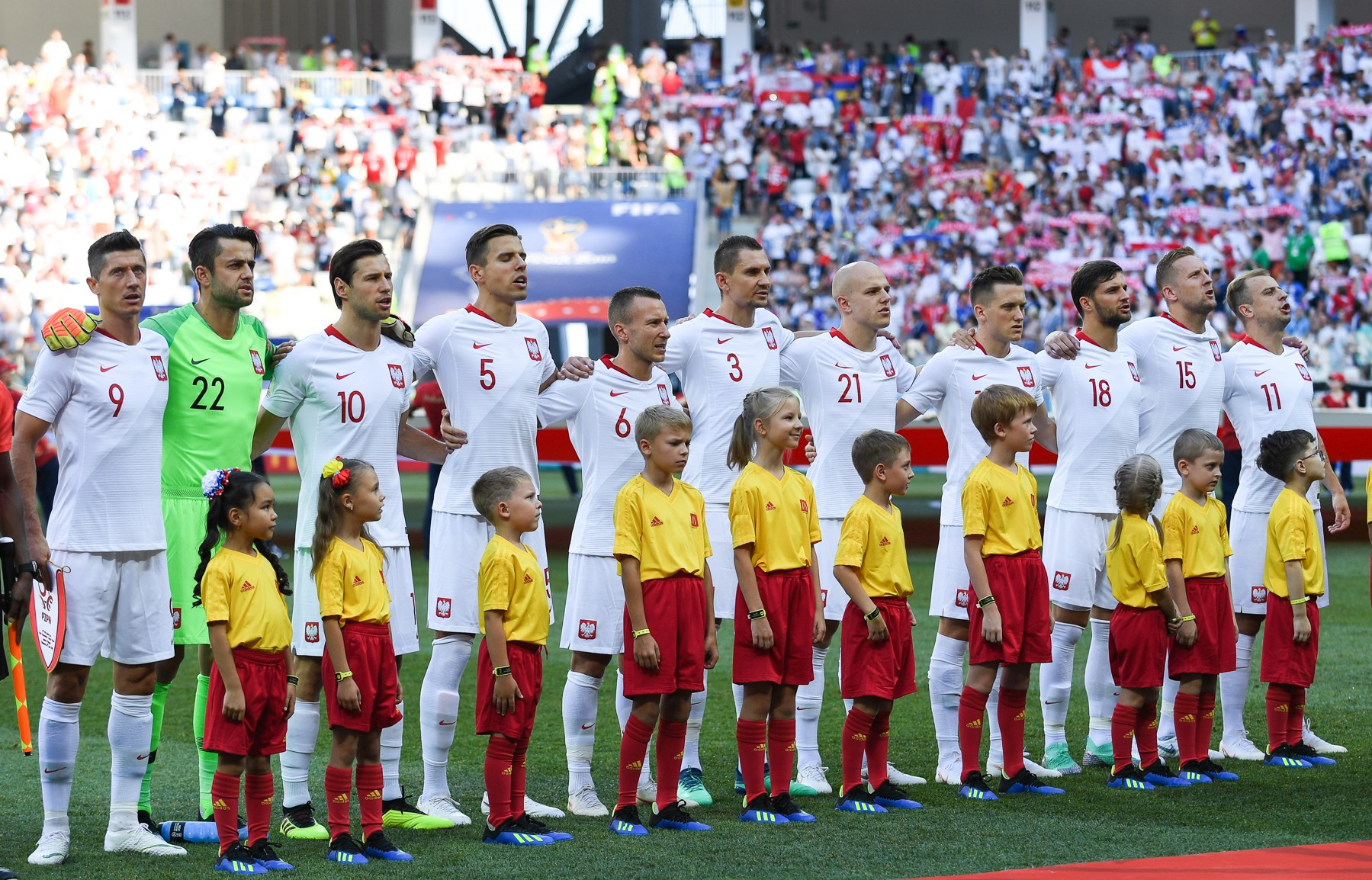
The Poland national team line-up before the third and final group game against Japan on 28 June 2018. Poland won the game 1–0

In 2018 FIFA World Cup qualifying, Poland were drawn in Group E, with Denmark, Montenegro, Romania, Armenia and Kazakhstan.

Despite drawing with Kazakhstan on 4 September 2016 opening match, Lewandowski scored 16 goals during qualifying, breaking the European qualifying scoring record, as well as becoming the all-time top goalscorer of Poland.

Poland played at the 2018 FIFA World Cup, their first World Cup since 2006, in Group H, against Senegal, Colombia and Japan. Despite the group being considered close, Poland were tipped as favorites to advance.

Poland's tournament was disappointing overall; they lost to Senegal in the opening match, 2–1 on 19 June in Moscow. Five days later, on 24 June, they lost to Colombia in Kazan 3–0, mathematically eliminating them from the round of 16. They did beat Japan 1–0 in their final group game in Volgograd. Poland finished at the bottom of their group.

Qualifying for UEFA Euro 2020 was based on performance in the inaugural 2018–19 UEFA Nations League. In 2018, Poland was drawn into Group 3 in the 2018–19 UEFA Nations League A, along with Portugal and Italy. Poland was relegated to League B with two home defeats and two away draws, only to be allowed to remain on League A following UEFA rule changes.

Poland opened their UEFA Euro 2020 qualifying by a single-margin 1–0 win against Austria in Vienna. Three days later, Poland followed up their suit by beating Latvia 2–0 at home.

On 7 June 2019, Poland defeated North Macedonia 1–0 by a lone goal from Piątek. They then beat Israel 4–0 in Warsaw. Poland then lost 2–0 to Slovenia in Ljubljana. A following 0–0 home draw to Austria meant that Poland's top spot was under bank, with Slovenia approaching very quickly.

In October, Poland embattled two opponents, Latvia and North Macedonia, for its UEFA Euro 2020 quest. Poland managed a convincing 3–0 away win over Latvia, eliminating them from the competition. Slovenia's shock away defeat to North Macedonia relieved pressure for Poland, with Slovenia falling from second to fourth place. Eventually, Poland beat North Macedonia 2–0 at home, and with Slovenia falling at home to Austria, Poland qualified for the Euros for the fourth consecutive time.

Being allowed to remain in League A, Poland was drawn against Italy, the Netherlands, and Bosnia and Herzegovina. The performance of this tournament doubled as part of the upcoming 2022 FIFA World Cup qualification as playoff campaigns.

Poland started their League games without Lewandowski. In their first match, an away game against the Netherlands, the Poles lost 1–0. Later, Poland made a trip to Bosnia; the Bosnian team, including Edin Džeko, had held Italy 1–1 draw away before. However, Poland managed a comeback from a goal down, with Kamil Glik and Kamil Grosicki scoring to beat Bosnia 2–1. In October, Poland hosted Italy and Bosnia at home; a goalless draw with Italy combined with a 3–0 win over Bosnia made them temporarily occupy the top spot of the group. However, in November, Poland suffered a 2–0 defeat despite Italy being depleted by COVID-19. Poland lost to the Netherlands 2–1 at home, ending in third place.

Poland participated in UEFA Euro 2020, postponed to 2021 due to COVID-19. A 2–1 loss to Slovakia, followed by a 1–1 draw to Spain, preceded a 3–2 defeat to Sweden to eliminate the Poles.

=== 2022–present ===
Poland advanced to the second round (play-offs) of World Cup qualification to determine the final three European teams that would join the group winners at the 2022 FIFA World Cup in Qatar. Poland was scheduled to face Russia in Moscow on 24 March 2022 in the semi-final of a four-team playoff bracket that also included Sweden and the Czech Republic. However, following the Russian invasion of Ukraine, FIFA indefinitely suspended Russia from all international competition. Poland advanced automatically to the play-off finals, where they defeated Sweden to qualify.

At the 2022 World Cup, Poland was drawn into Group C, where they were scheduled to play against Argentina, Saudi Arabia, and Mexico. The first match ended with a goalless draw against Mexico. Goals from Piotr Zieliński and Robert Lewandowski gave Poland a 2–0 win against Saudi Arabia in the second match. Following their loss to Argentina, Poland advanced to the knockout stage ahead of Mexico on goal difference, their first knockout stage appearance since 1986. During the match, Wojciech Szczęsny denied Lionel Messi on a penalty kick opportunity. Szczęsny became the third keeper ever to stop two penalties in a single World Cup, with the others being Brad Friedel in 2002 for the United States and Jan Tomaszewski in 1974, also for Poland. In the round of 16, Poland lost 3–1 to France, in which Robert Lewandowski scored a penalty in stoppage time.

Czesław Michniewicz did not renew his contract as manager and his place was taken by award-winning coach Fernando Santos to take on the mission of qualifying for Euro 2024. Away defeats to the Czech Republic, Moldova and Albania brought his dismissal. In September 2023, Fernando Santos was replaced by Michał Probierz, who started with a win against the Faroe Islands in Euro 2024 qualifying, but then drew at home with Moldova. Poland later ended qualification for Euro 2024 with a 1–1 home draw to the Czech Republic, ending all hopes for Poland to clinch automatic qualification. However, because of Poland's Nations League performance, the Poles were able to salvage a place in the play-offs, where Poland defeated without problem Estonia 5–1, with the advantage of playing at home, and aided by Maksim Paskotši's 2nd yellow card in the 27th minute, the visitors were outnumbered for most of the match. After a goalless draw away against Wales, the Poles won on penalties to secure a spot at the Euros. At the tournament, they finished last in the group after losing 2–1 to the Netherlands, 3–1 to Austria, and drawing 1–1 with France.

After Robert Lewandowski was stripped of captaincy in June, he announced his retirement from international duty until Probierz was no longer the manager. Following their 2–1 away defeat to Finland in a 2026 FIFA World Cup qualifier, Probierz resigned from the national team. On 16 July 2025, he was replaced by Jan Urban.

== Team image ==
=== Names ===
The official FIFA country code for Poland is POL. This abbreviation is used to identify the team in FIFA, UEFA, and other matches. The same abbreviation is also used under the International Organization for Standardization. "Polish national football team" can be translated into Polish as "Reprezentacja Polski w piłce nożnej". The team's most common nicknames include "Biało-czerwoni", which means "The white-reds", and "Orły", which translates into "The Eagles". In English, the team is also widely known as "The White Eagles", based on Poland's national coat of arms.

=== Supporters ===
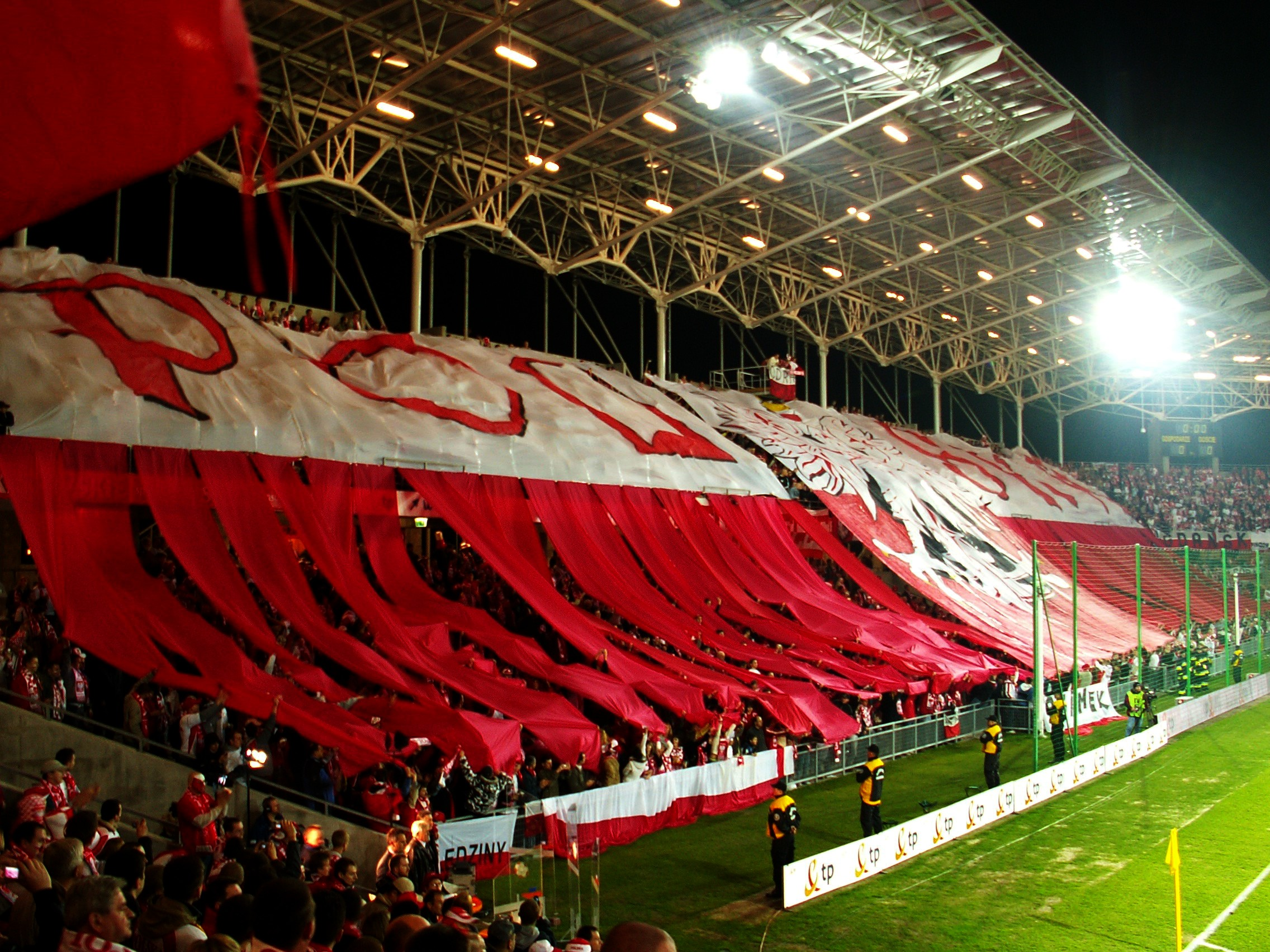
Polish football fans

The Polish team enjoys widespread support in Poland and among Polish diaspora worldwide. A notable chant among Polish fans is "Polska, biało-czerwoni" ("Poland, the White-Reds").

=== National kits ===
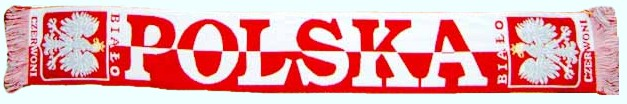
Poland scarf

The national kits of Poland reflect the colours of the national flag, which are white and red. Apart from minor details (in the 1920s the socks in the home kit were striped), the design remains unchanged since 1921. The home kit consists of a white shirt, red shorts, and white socks; the away kit is all red (though sometimes worn with white shorts). On the rare occasions when both home and away kits clash with the opponent's, a colours third kit is available, usually in either black or blue (currently navy blue with white-red sleeves).

The kit has traditionally been adorned with the coat of arms of Poland, i.e. the crowned white eagle. Until 2006, the coat of arms featured only the inscription "POLSKA" in capital letters above the eagle, and not, as with many other national teams, the national football federation logo. The Euro 2012 kits were the first to feature the logo of the PZPN. When the kit was first launched it did not include the coat of arms, but it was restored shortly thereafter. Since 2009, the kits have been provided by Nike.

Kit supplier	Period
(Poland) Polsport	until 1974
(West Germany) Adidas	1974–1992
(United Kingdom) Admiral	1992–1993
(Germany) Adidas	1993
(Italy) Lotto	1993–1994
(Germany) Puma	1994–1996
(United States) Nike	1996–1999
(Germany) Adidas	1999
(Germany) Puma	1999–2000
(Poland) Tico	2000
(Germany) Puma	2001–2008
(United States) Nike	2009–present

== Stadiums ==
=== Main stadiums ===
Silesian Stadium in Chorzów was built in 1956; the stadium has a seating capacity of 47,246. The stadium was renovated to expand its seating capacity to 55,211 and was reopened in October 2017. In 1993, the stadium was designated as the official home stadium of the Poland national team. In 2011, the National Stadium in Warsaw was completed with a capacity of 58,580 and since then, it has become a major stadium of Polish team and hosts most of Euro and World Cup qualifications matches.

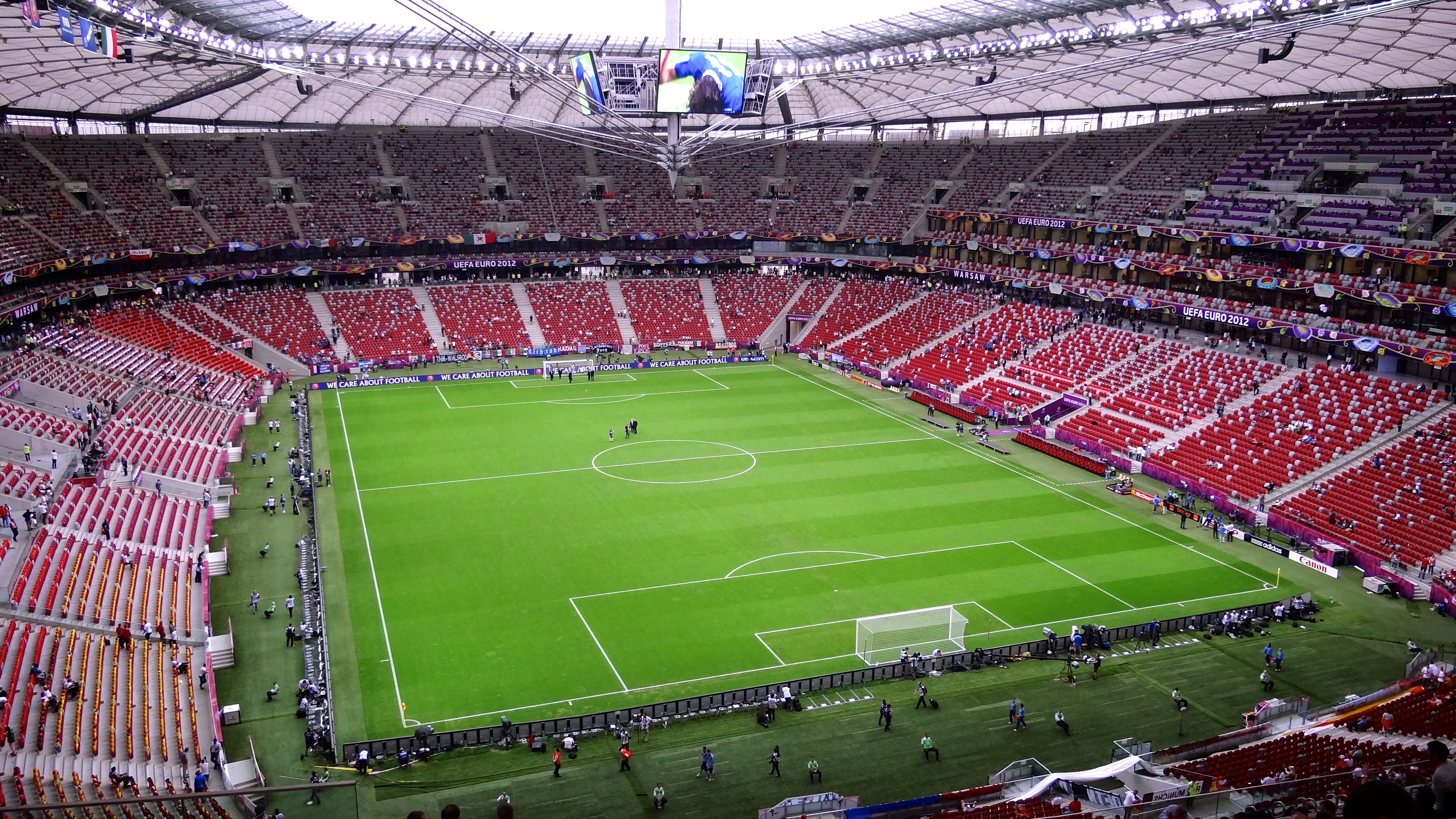
National Stadium

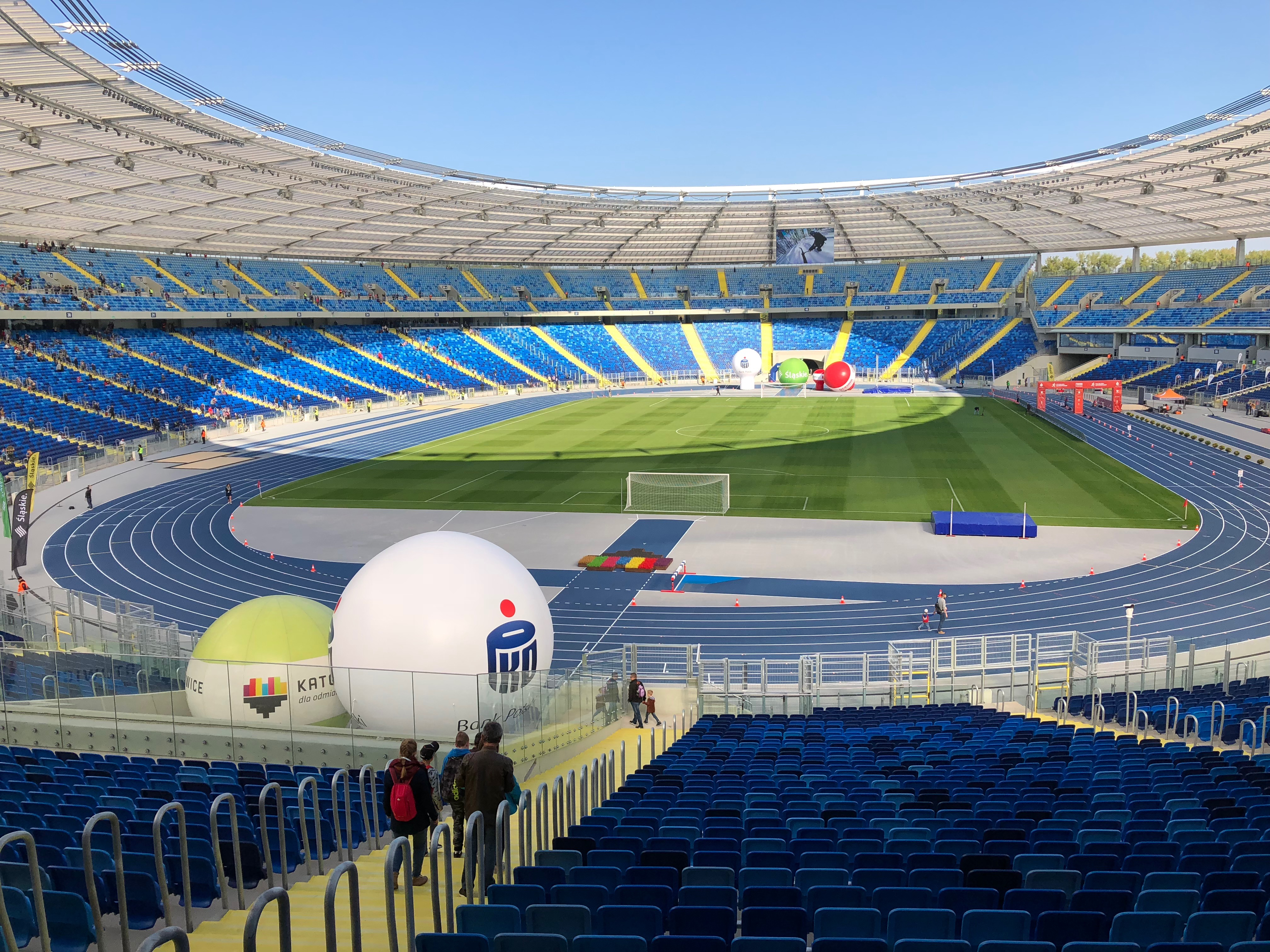
Silesian Stadium

=== Other stadiums ===
Poland has also played at the following stadiums:

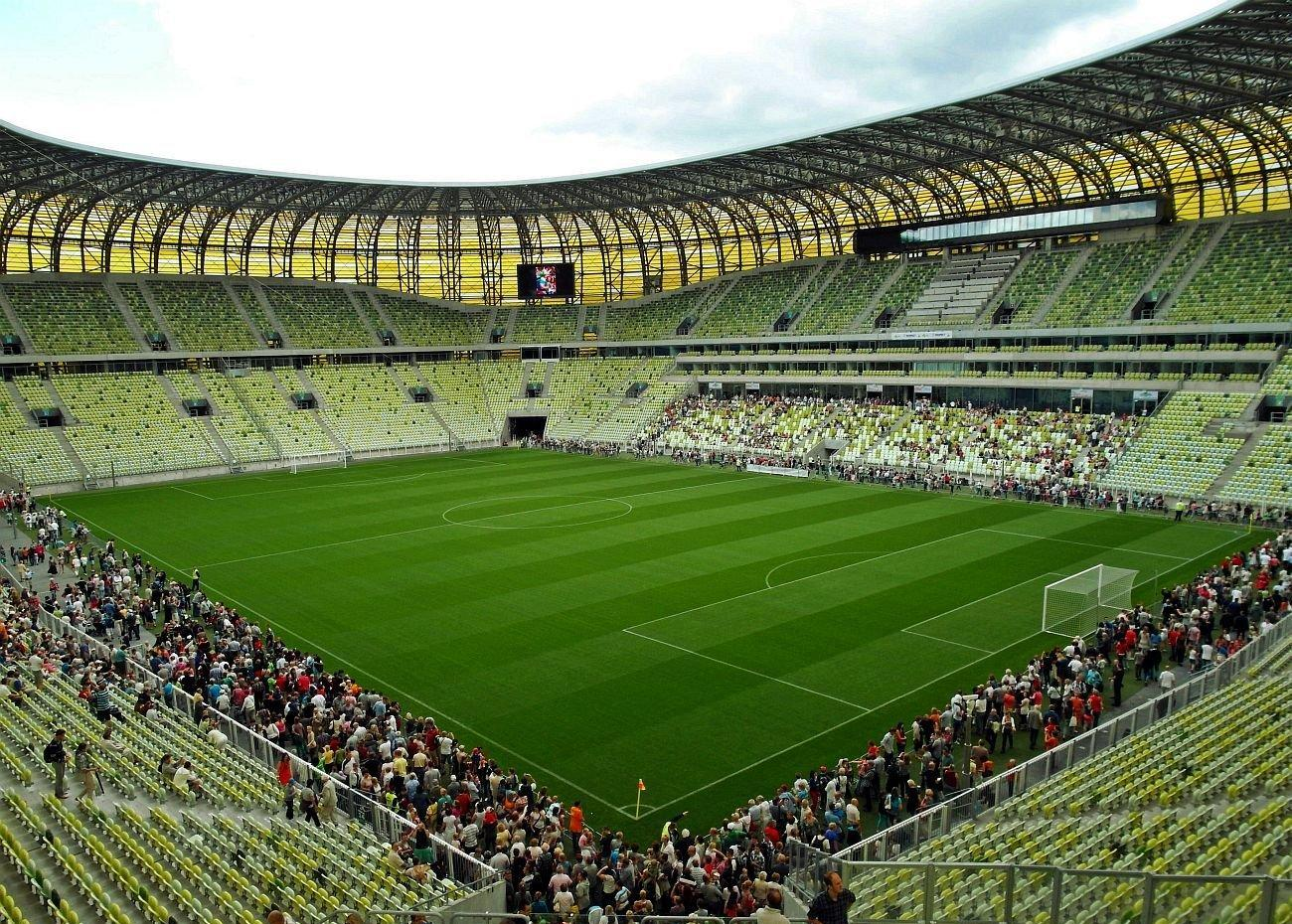
Gdańsk Stadium

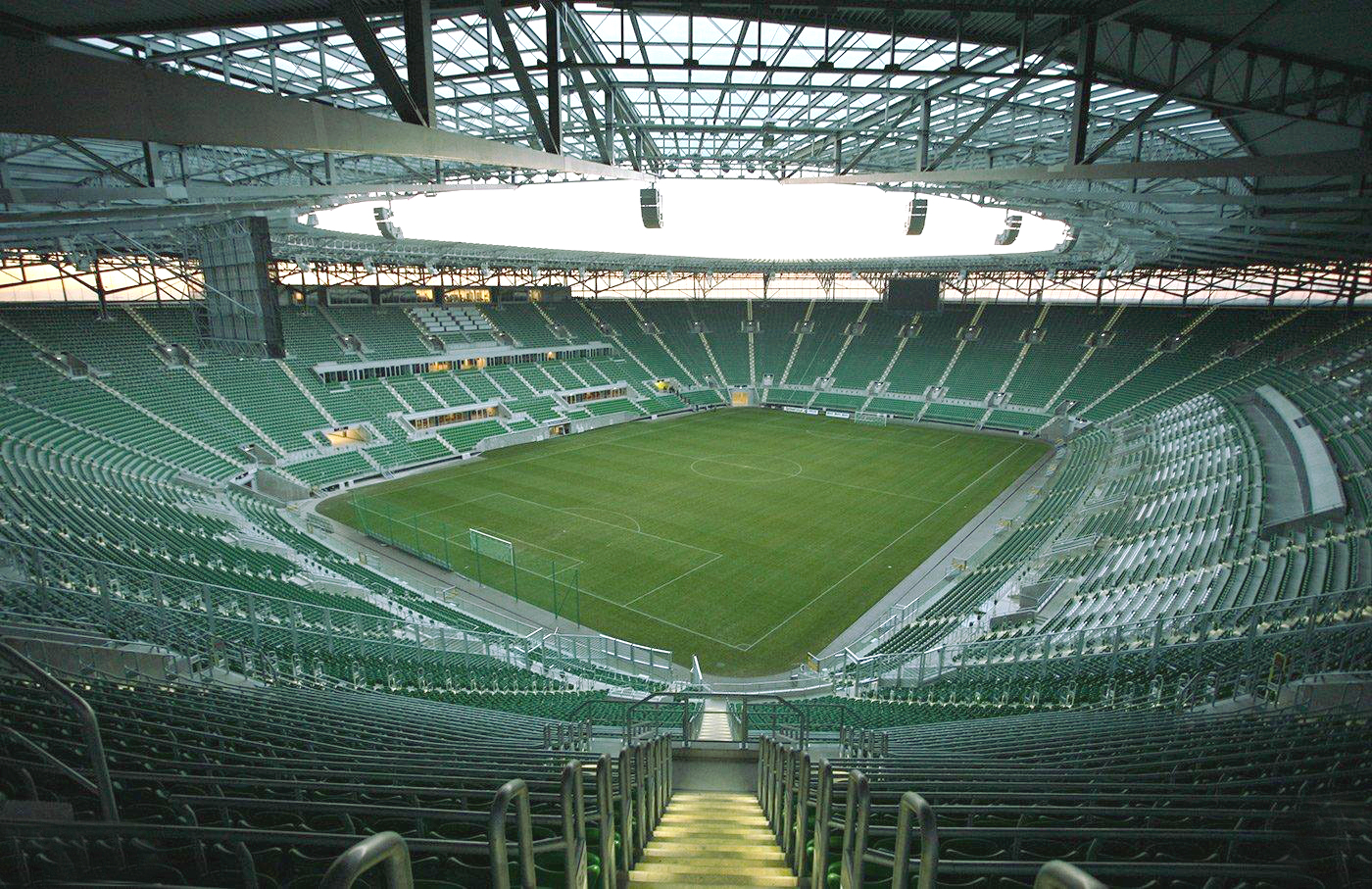
Wrocław Stadium

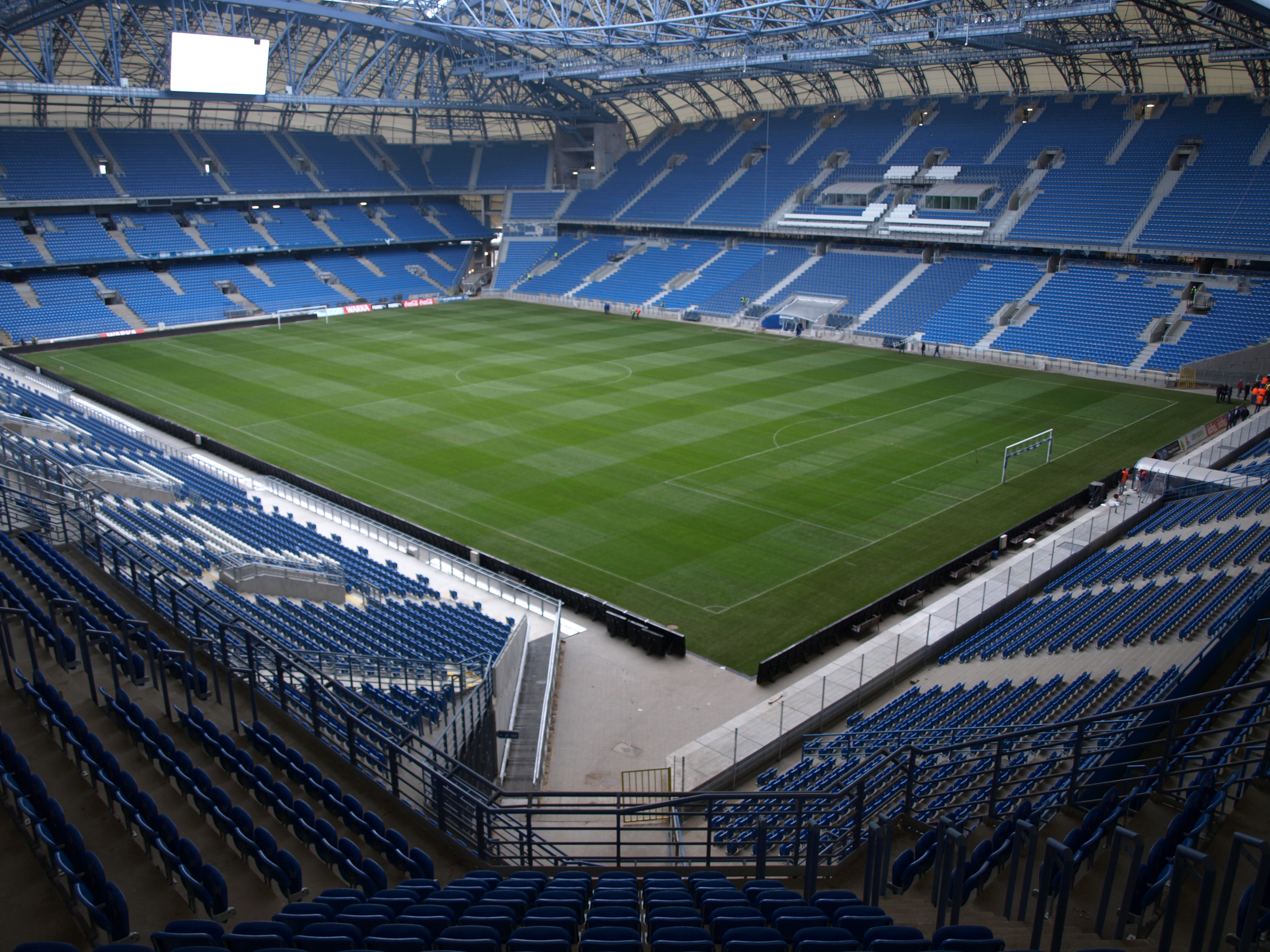
Poznań Stadium

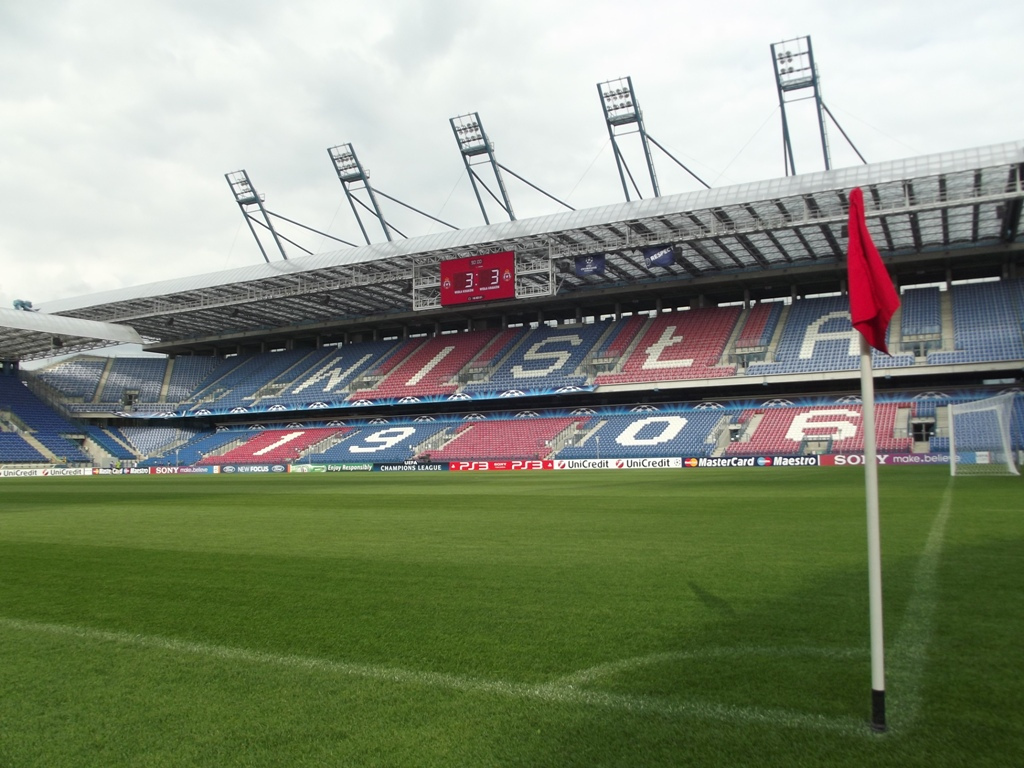
Henryk Reyman Stadium

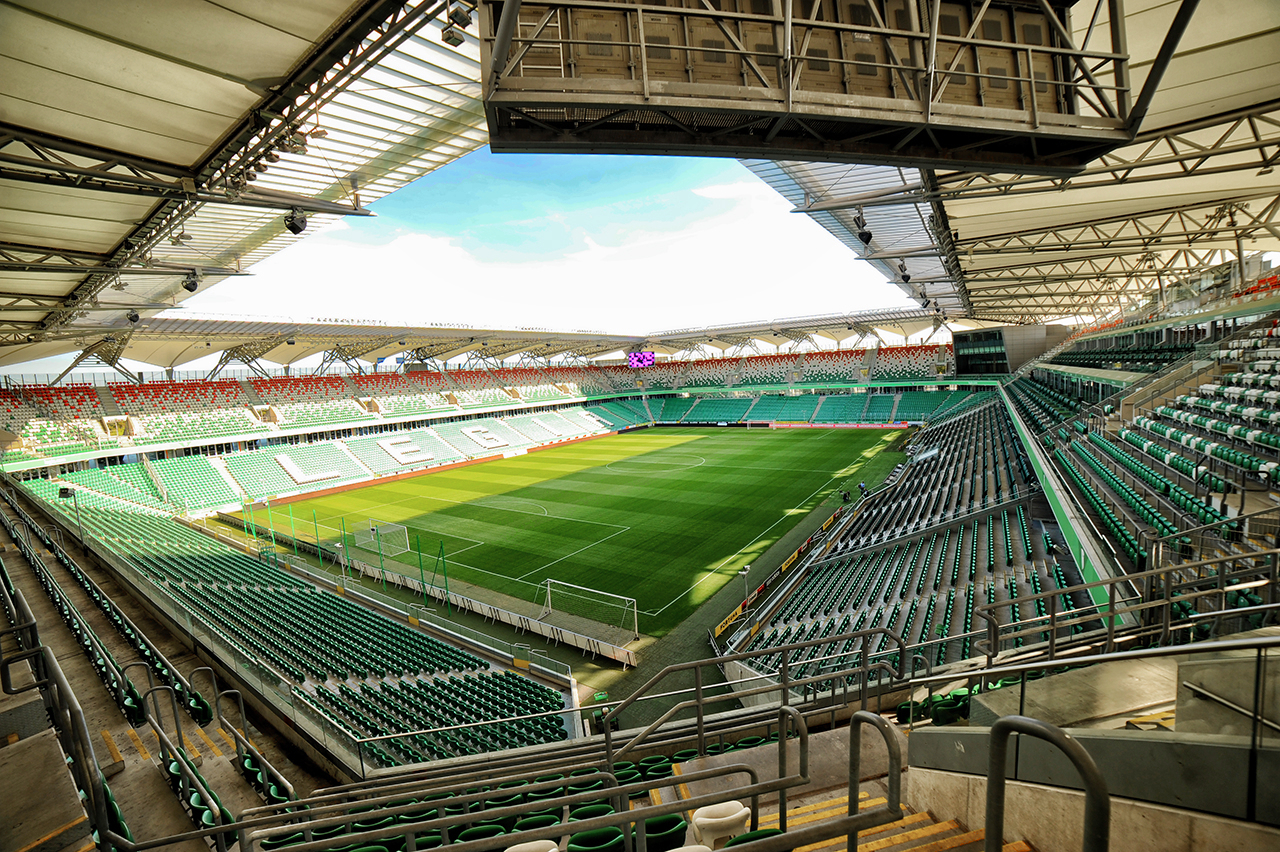
Polish Army Stadium

== Results and fixtures ==
The list below includes match results in the last 12 months, as well as any future matches that have been scheduled.

Win Draw Loss Fixture

=== 2026 ===
26 March 2026 2026 FIFA World Cup qualification play-offs	Poland	2–1	Albania	Warsaw, Poland
20:45 CET (UTC+1)	Lewandowski 63'; Zieliński 73'	Report	Hoxha 42'	Stadium: Stadion Narodowy; Attendance: 56,412; Referee: Anthony Taylor (England)

31 March 2026 2026 FIFA World Cup qualification play-offs	Sweden	3–2	Poland	Solna, Sweden
20:45 CEST (UTC+2)	Elanga 20'; Lagerbielke 44'; Gyökeres 88'	Report	Zalewski 33'; Świderski 55'	Stadium: Nationalarenan; Attendance: 49,627; Referee: Slavko Vinčić (Slovenia)

31 May 2026 Friendly	Poland	0–2	Ukraine	Wrocław, Poland
17:30 CEST (UTC+2)		Report	Yaremchuk 34'; Yarmolenko 44'	Stadium: Wrocław Stadium; Attendance: 37,904; Referee: Filip Glova (Slovakia)

3 June 2026 Friendly	Poland	2–2	Nigeria	Warsaw, Poland
20:45 CEST (UTC+2)	Potulski 45+1'; Wiśniewski 90+5'	Report	Moffi 23'; Onuachu 77' (pen.)	Stadium: Stadion Narodowy; Attendance: 54,408; Referee: Marian Barbu (Romania)

25 September 2026 2026–27 UEFA Nations League	Poland	0–0	Bosnia and Herzegovina	Warsaw, Poland
20:45 CEST (UTC+2)		Report		Stadium: Stadion Narodowy; Attendance: 46,775; Referee: Anastasios Papapetrou (Greece)

28 September 2026 2026–27 UEFA Nations League	Sweden	3–1	Poland	Solna, Sweden
20:45 CEST (UTC+2)	Nygren 8'; Ayari 64'; Gyökeres 72'	Report	Szymański 43'	Stadium: Nationalarenan; Attendance: 24,637; Referee: Javier Alberola Rojas (Spain)

2 October 2026 2026–27 UEFA Nations League	Poland	6–0	Romania	Warsaw, Poland
20:45 CEST (UTC+2)	Lewandowski 24' (pen.), 47', 86'; Ghiță 49' (o.g.); Zieliński 62'; Bednarek 66'	Report		Stadium: Stadion Narodowy; Attendance: 51,054; Referee: Urs Schnyder (Switzerland)

5 October 2026 2026–27 UEFA Nations League	Bosnia and Herzegovina	1–0	Poland	Zenica, Bosnia and Herzegovina
20:45 CEST (UTC+2)	Bašić 84' (pen.)	Report		Stadium: Stadion Bilino Polje; Attendance: 11,700; Referee: Jérémie Pignard (France)

14 November 2026 2026–27 UEFA Nations League	Romania	2–1	Poland	Bucharest, Romania
21:45 CEST (UTC+2)	Cicâldău 68'; Man 72'	Report	Reguła 82'	Stadium: Arena Națională; Attendance: 45,827; Referee: Sebastian Gishamer (Austria)

17 November 2026 2026–27 UEFA Nations League	Poland	1–1	Sweden	Wrocław, Poland
20:45 CET (UTC+1)	Benedyczak 16'	Report	Larsson 24'	Stadium: Wrocław Stadium; Attendance: 38,516; Referee: Felix Zwayer (Germany)

== Non-playing staff ==
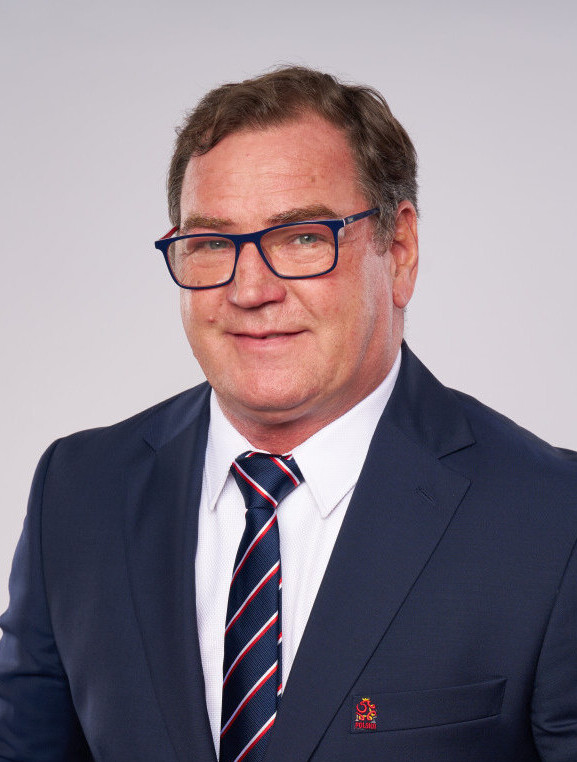
Current head coach Jan Urban

As of 15 July 2026

Position	Name
Head coach	(Poland) Jan Urban
Assistant head coach	(Spain) Kibu Vicuña
Assistant coaches	(Poland) Marcin Prasoł (Poland) Grzegorz Staszewski
Goalkeeping coaches	(Poland) Andrzej Dawidziuk (Poland) Józef Młynarczyk
Fitness coaches	(Poland) (Mexico) Cesar Sanjuan-Szklarz (Spain) Juan Angel Iribarren Morras
Match analyst	(Poland) Hubert Małowiejski
Video analyst	(Poland) Jakub Rejmoniak
Doctor	(Poland) Jacek Jaroszewski
Physiotherapists	(Poland) Paweł Bamber (Poland) Marcin Bator (Poland) Wojciech Herman (Poland) Adam Kurek
Team director	(Poland) Adrian Mierzejewski
Communications manager	(Poland) Tomasz Kozłowski
Logistics manager	(Poland) Łukasz Gawrjołek
Technical director	(Poland) Paweł Kosedowski
Assistant technical director	(Poland) Paweł Sidorowicz

=== Coaching history ===
Caretaker manager are listed in italics.

Prior to 1966 the Polish team was chosen by a selection committee.

- (Poland) Michał Matyas (1966–1967)
- (Poland) Ryszard Koncewicz (1968–1970)
- (Poland) Kazimierz Górski (1971–1976)
- (Poland) Jacek Gmoch (1976–1978)
- (Poland) Ryszard Kulesza (1978–1980)
- (Poland) Antoni Piechniczek (1981–1986, 1996–1997)
- (Poland) Wojciech Łazarek (1986–1989)
- (Poland) Andrzej Strejlau (1989–1993)
- (Poland) Lesław Ćmikiewicz (1993)
- (Poland) Henryk Apostel (1994–1995)
- (Poland) Władysław Stachurski (1996)
- (Poland) Krzysztof Pawlak (1997)
- (Poland) Janusz Wójcik (1997–1999)
- (Poland) Jerzy Engel (2000–2002)
- (Poland) Zbigniew Boniek (2002)
- (Poland) Paweł Janas (2003–2006)
- (Netherlands) Leo Beenhakker (2006–2009)
- (Poland) Stefan Majewski (2009)
- (Poland) Franciszek Smuda (2009–2012)
- (Poland) Waldemar Fornalik (2012–2013)
- (Poland) Adam Nawałka (2013–2018)
- (Poland) Jerzy Brzęczek (2018–2021)
- (Portugal) Paulo Sousa (2021)
- (Poland) Czesław Michniewicz (2022)
- (Portugal) Fernando Santos (2023)
- (Poland) Michał Probierz (2023–2025)
- (Poland) Jan Urban (2025–present)

== Players ==
=== Current squad ===
The following players were called up for UEFA Nations League matches against Romania and Sweden on 14 and 17 November 2026, respectively. On 12 November, Przemysław Frankowski withdrew from the squad due to injury and was replaced by Arkadiusz Pyrka.
Caps and goals updated as of 17 November 2026, after the match against Sweden, as recognized by the PZPN.

No.	Pos.	Player	Date of birth (age)	Caps	Goals	Club
1	GK	Bartłomiej Drągowski	19 August 1997 (age 29)	5	0	(Polish Football Association) Widzew Łódź
12	GK	Mateusz Kochalski	25 July 2000 (age 26)	0	0	(Polish Football Association) Wieczysta Kraków
22	GK	Sławomir Abramowicz	9 June 2004 (age 22)	1	0	(Polish Football Association) Jagiellonia Białystok
2	DF	Arkadiusz Pyrka	20 September 2002 (age 24)	5	0	(German Football Association) FC St. Pauli
3	DF	Kamil Piątkowski	21 June 2000 (age 26)	8	1	(Polish Football Association) Legia Warsaw
4	DF	Tomasz Kędziora	11 June 1994 (age 32)	39	1	(Ukrainian Association of Football) Dynamo Kyiv
5	DF	Jan Bednarek (third captain)	12 April 1996 (age 30)	80	2	(Portuguese Football Federation) Porto
15	DF	Tymoteusz Puchacz	23 January 1999 (age 27)	16	0	(Association of Football Federations of Azerbaijan) Sabah
23	DF	Kacper Potulski	19 October 2007 (age 19)	5	1	(German Football Association) Mainz 05
6	MF	Bartosz Mazurek	3 January 2007 (age 19)	1	0	(Austrian Football Association) Red Bull Salzburg
8	MF	Kacper Urbański	7 September 2004 (age 22)	14	0	(Polish Football Association) Górnik Zabrze
10	MF	Piotr Zieliński (vice-captain)	20 May 1994 (age 32)	114	18	(Italian Football Federation) Inter Milan
14	MF	Oskar Kubiak	25 September 2006 (age 20)	2	0	(Football Association of the Czech Republic) Slavia Prague
16	MF	Wiktor Nowak	20 September 2004 (age 22)	6	0	(Football Association of the Czech Republic) Slavia Prague
17	MF	Michał Skóraś	15 February 2000 (age 26)	18	0	(French Football Federation) Lens
18	MF	Marcel Reguła	26 October 2006 (age 20)	4	1	(Polish Football Association) Zagłębie Lubin
19	MF	Łukasz Poręba	13 March 2000 (age 26)	1	0	(German Football Association) SV Elversberg
20	MF	Sebastian Szymański	10 May 1999 (age 27)	60	7	(French Football Federation) Rennes
21	MF	Nicola Zalewski	23 January 2002 (age 24)	42	4	(Italian Football Federation) Atalanta
7	FW	Adrian Benedyczak	24 November 2000 (age 25)	2	1	(Turkish Football Federation) Kasımpaşa
9	FW	Robert Lewandowski (captain)	21 August 1988 (age 38)	172	92	(United States Soccer Federation) Chicago Fire
11	FW	Karol Świderski	23 January 1997 (age 29)	56	14	(Polish Football Association) Widzew Łódź
13	FW	Mateusz Żukowski	23 November 2001 (age 24)	6	0	(German Football Association) 1. FC Magdeburg

=== Recent call-ups ===
The following players have been called up for the national team in the last twelve months.

Pos.	Player	Date of birth (age)	Caps	Goals	Club	Latest call-up
GK	Marcin Bułka	4 October 1999 (age 27)	10	0	(Saudi Arabia) Neom	v. Bosnia and Herzegovina, 5 October 2026
GK	Kamil Grabara	8 January 1999 (age 27)	6	0	(Italy) Juventus	v. Bosnia and Herzegovina, 25 September 2026 ^{INJ}
GK	Bartosz Mrozek	23 February 2000 (age 26)	0	0	(Italy) Udinese	v. Sweden, 31 March 2026
DF	Jakub Kiwior	15 February 2000 (age 26)	50	2	(Portugal) Porto	v. Sweden, 17 November 2026 ^{SUS}
DF	Matty Cash	7 August 1997 (age 29)	30	4	(England) Aston Villa	v. Sweden, 17 November 2026 ^{INJ}
DF	Przemysław Wiśniewski	27 July 1998 (age 28)	9	1	(Poland) Widzew Łódź	v. Bosnia and Herzegovina, 5 October 2026
DF	Norbert Wojtuszek	5 October 2001 (age 25)	4	0	(Poland) Jagiellonia Białystok	v. Bosnia and Herzegovina, 5 October 2026
DF	Wojciech Mońka	18 January 2007 (age 19)	0	0	(Poland) Lech Poznań	v. Bosnia and Herzegovina, 5 October 2026 ^{U21}
DF	Oskar Wójcik	21 July 2003 (age 23)	1	0	(Germany) Werder Bremen	v. Nigeria, 3 June 2026
DF	Bartosz Bereszyński	12 July 1992 (age 34)	59	0	(Poland) Motor Lublin	v. Sweden, 31 March 2026
DF	Jan Ziółkowski	5 June 2005 (age 21)	3	0	(Italy) Monza	v. Sweden, 31 March 2026
MF	Przemysław Frankowski	12 April 1995 (age 31)	55	3	(France) Rennes	v. Romania, 14 November 2026 ^{INJ}
MF	Bartosz Slisz	29 March 1999 (age 27)	26	1	(Denmark) Brøndby	v. Bosnia and Herzegovina, 5 October 2026
MF	Oskar Pietuszewski	20 May 2008 (age 18)	6	0	(Portugal) Porto	v. Bosnia and Herzegovina, 5 October 2026
MF	Jakub Kamiński	5 June 2002 (age 24)	32	3	(Portugal) Benfica	v. Sweden, 28 September 2026 ^{INJ}
MF	Filip Rózga	7 August 2006 (age 20)	4	0	(Austria) Sturm Graz	v. Bosnia and Herzegovina, 25 September 2026 ^{INJ}
MF	Bartosz Kapustka	23 December 1996 (age 29)	22	3	(Poland) Legia Warsaw	v. Nigeria, 3 June 2026
MF	Jakub Piotrowski	4 October 1997 (age 29)	14	2	(Italy) Udinese	v. Nigeria, 3 June 2026
MF	Kacper Kozłowski	16 October 2003 (age 23)	8	0	(Turkey) Gaziantep	v. Nigeria, 3 June 2026
MF	Kamil Grosicki ^{RET}	8 June 1988 (age 38)	101	17	(Poland) Pogoń Szczecin	v. Sweden, 31 March 2026
MF	Jakub Moder	7 April 1999 (age 27)	36	2	(Netherlands) Feyenoord	v. Sweden, 31 March 2026
FW	Karol Czubak	25 January 2000 (age 26)	1	0	(Poland) Motor Lublin	v. Nigeria, 3 June 2026
FW	Krzysztof Piątek	1 July 1995 (age 31)	39	12	(Qatar) Al-Duhail	v. Sweden, 31 March 2026
^{INJ} Withdrew from the squad due to an injury.^{RET} Retired from the national team.^{U21} Joined Poland national under-21 football team.

== Individual statistics ==
As of 17 November 2026.
Players in bold are still active with Poland.

=== Most appearances ===
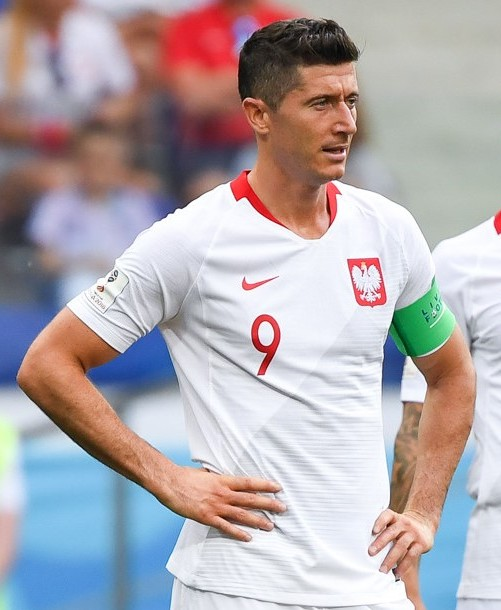
Robert Lewandowski is Poland's top goalscorer and their most capped player.

Rank	Player	Caps	Goals	Career
1	**Robert Lewandowski**	172	92	2008–present
2	**Piotr Zieliński**	114	18	2013–present
3	Jakub Błaszczykowski	109	21	2006–2023
4	Kamil Glik	103	6	2010–2022
5	Michał Żewłakow	102	3	1999–2011
6	Kamil Grosicki	101	17	2008–2026
7	Grzegorz Krychowiak	100	5	2008–2023
7	Grzegorz Lato	100	45	1971–1984
9	Kazimierz Deyna	97	41	1968–1978
10	Jacek Bąk	96	3	1993–2008
10	Jacek Krzynówek	96	15	1998–2009

=== Top goalscorers ===
Rank	Player	Goals	Caps	Ratio	Career
1	**Robert Lewandowski** (list)	92	172	0.53	2008–present
2	Włodzimierz Lubański	48	75	0.64	1963–1980
3	Grzegorz Lato	45	100	0.45	1971–1984
4	Kazimierz Deyna	41	97	0.42	1968–1978
5	Ernest Pol	39	46	0.85	1955–1965
6	Andrzej Szarmach	32	61	0.52	1973–1982
7	Gerard Cieślik	27	45	0.6	1947–1958
8	Zbigniew Boniek	24	80	0.3	1976–1988
9	Ernest Wilimowski	21	22	0.95	1934–1939
9	Jakub Błaszczykowski	21	109	0.19	2006–2023

=== Most clean sheets ===
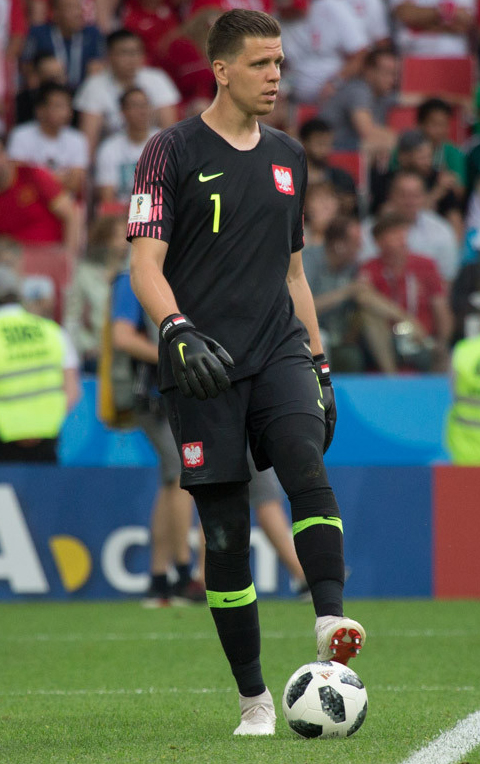
Wojciech Szczęsny has kept the most clean sheets for Poland.

Rank	Player	Clean sheets	Caps	Ratio	Career
1	Wojciech Szczęsny	34	84	0.4	2009–2024
2	Łukasz Fabiański	27	57	0.47	2006–2021
3	Józef Wandzik	25	52	0.48	1985–1995
4	Artur Boruc	24	65	0.37	2004–2017
5	Jerzy Dudek	23	60	0.38	1998–2013
5	Jan Tomaszewski	23	63	0.37	1971–1981
7	Adam Matysek	20	34	0.59	1991–2002
8	Hubert Kostka	13	32	0.41	1962–1972
8	Jarosław Bako	13	35	0.37	1988–1993
8	Józef Młynarczyk	13	42	0.31	1979–1986

=== Most caps as captain ===
Rank	Player	Captains caps	Total caps	Career
1	**Robert Lewandowski**	104	172	2008–present
2	Kazimierz Deyna	57	97	1968–1978
3	Jakub Błaszczykowski	32	109	2006–2023
4	Jacek Bąk	29	96	1993–2008
5	Tomasz Wałdoch	27	74	1991–2002
6	Michał Żewłakow	25	102	1999–2011
7	Henryk Szczepański	24	45	1957–1965
8	Gerard Cieślik	22	45	1947–1958
9	Waldemar Prusik	21	49	1983–1991
9	Stanisław Oślizło	21	57	1961–1971
9	Władysław Żmuda	21	91	1973–1986

== Competitive record ==
Champions Runners-up Third place Tournament played fully or partially on home soil

=== FIFA World Cup ===
FIFA World Cup record										Qualification record						
Year	Round	Pos	Pld	W	D	L	GF	GA	Squad	Pos	Pld	W	D	L	GF	GA
(Uruguay) 1930	Did not enter									Did not enter						
(Italy) 1934	Did not qualify									2nd	2	0	0	2	1	4
(France) 1938	Round of 16	11th	1	0	0	1	5	6	Squad	1st	1	0	0	1	4	1
(Brazil) 1950	Did not enter									Did not enter						
(Switzerland) 1954	Did not enter									Did not enter						
(Sweden) 1958	Did not qualify									2nd	5	3	0	2	9	7
(Chile) 1962	Did not qualify									2nd	2	0	1	1	2	3
(England) 1966	Did not qualify									3rd	6	2	2	2	11	10
(Mexico) 1970	Did not qualify									2nd	6	4	0	2	19	8
(West Germany) 1974	Third place	3rd	7	6	0	1	16	5	Squad	1st	4	2	1	1	6	3
(Argentina) 1978	Quarter-finals (Note: Last 8 held as second group stage.)	5th	6	3	1	2	6	6	Squad	1st	6	5	1	0	17	4
(Spain) 1982	Third place	3rd	7	3	3	1	11	5	Squad	1st	4	4	0	0	12	2
(Mexico) 1986	Round of 16	14th	4	1	1	2	1	7	Squad	1st	6	3	2	1	10	6
(Italy) 1990	Did not qualify									3rd	6	2	1	3	4	8
(United States) 1994	Did not qualify									4th	10	3	2	4	10	15
(France) 1998	Did not qualify									3rd	8	3	1	5	10	12
(South Korea) (Japan) 2002	Group stage	25th	3	1	0	2	3	7	Squad	1st	10	6	3	1	21	11
(Germany) 2006	Group stage	21st	3	1	0	2	2	4	Squad	2nd	10	8	0	2	27	9
(South Africa) 2010	Did not qualify									5th	10	3	2	5	19	14
(Brazil) 2014	Did not qualify									4th	10	3	4	3	18	12
(Russia) 2018	Group stage	25th	3	1	0	2	2	5	Squad	1st	10	8	1	1	28	14
(Qatar) 2022	Round of 16	15th	4	1	1	2	3	5	Squad	2nd (P/O)	11	8	2	2	32	11
(Canada) (Mexico) (United States) 2026	Did not qualify									2nd (P/O)	10	6	2	2	18	11
(Canada) (Mexico) (United States) 2026	Did not qualify									To be determined						
(Morocco) (Portugal) (Spain) 2030	To be determined									To be determined						
(Saudi Arabia) 2034	To be determined									To be determined						
Total: 9/23	Third place	3rd	38	17	6	15	49	50	—	—	138	73	25	40	278	165

==== Match history ====
FIFA World Cup history
Year	Round	Opponent	Score	Result
(France) 1938	Round of 16	Brazil	5–6	Loss
(West Germany) 1974	Group stage	Argentina	3–2	Win
(West Germany) 1974	Group stage	Haiti	7–0	Win
(West Germany) 1974	Group stage	Italy	2–1	Win
(West Germany) 1974	Second round	Sweden	1–0	Win
(West Germany) 1974	Second round	Yugoslavia	2–1	Win
(West Germany) 1974	Second round	West Germany	0-1	Loss
(West Germany) 1974	Bronze play-off	Brazil	1–0	Win
(Argentina) 1978	Group stage	West Germany	0–0	Draw
(Argentina) 1978	Group stage	Tunisia	1–0	Win
(Argentina) 1978	Group stage	Mexico	3–1	Win
(Argentina) 1978	Second round	Argentina	0–2	Loss
(Argentina) 1978	Second round	Peru	1–0	Win
(Argentina) 1978	Second round	Brazil	1–3	Loss
(Spain) 1982	Group stage	Italy	0–0	Draw
(Spain) 1982	Group stage	Cameroon	0–0	Draw
(Spain) 1982	Group stage	Peru	5–1	Win
(Spain) 1982	Second group stage	Belgium	3–0	Win
(Spain) 1982	Second group stage	Soviet Union	0–0	Draw
(Spain) 1982	Semi-finals	Italy	0–2	Loss
(Spain) 1982	Bronze play-off	France	3–2	Win
(Mexico) 1986	Group stage	Morocco	0–0	Draw
(Mexico) 1986	Group stage	Portugal	1–0	Win
(Mexico) 1986	Group stage	England	0–3	Loss
(Mexico) 1986	Round of 16	Brazil	0–4	Loss
(South Korea) (Japan) 2002	Group stage	South Korea	0–2	Loss
(South Korea) (Japan) 2002	Group stage	Portugal	0–4	Loss
(South Korea) (Japan) 2002	Group stage	United States	3–1	Win
(Germany) 2006	Group stage	Ecuador	0–2	Loss
(Germany) 2006	Group stage	Germany	0–1	Loss
(Germany) 2006	Group stage	Costa Rica	2–1	Win
(Russia) 2018	Group stage	Senegal	1–2	Loss
(Russia) 2018	Group stage	Colombia	0–3	Loss
(Russia) 2018	Group stage	Japan	1–0	Win
(Qatar) 2022	Group stage	Mexico	0–0	Draw
(Qatar) 2022	Group stage	Saudi Arabia	2–0	Win
(Qatar) 2022	Group stage	Argentina	0–2	Loss
(Qatar) 2022	Round of 16	France	1–3	Loss

=== Olympic Games ===
Year	Round	Pld	W	D	L	GF	GA	Squad
(Greece) 1896	No football tournament							
(France) 1900	Did not enter							
(United States) 1904	Did not enter							
(United Kingdom) 1908	Did not enter							
(Sweden) 1912	Did not enter							
(Belgium) 1920	Did not enter							
(France) 1924	Round 1	1	0	0	1	0	5	Squad
(Netherlands) 1928	Did not qualify							
(United States) 1932	No football tournament							
(Nazi Germany) 1936	Fourth place	4	2	0	2	11	10	Squad
(United Kingdom) 1948	Did not qualify							
(Finland) 1952	Round 1	2	1	0	1	2	3	Squad
(Australia) 1956	Did not qualify							
(Italy) 1960	Group stage	3	1	0	2	7	5	Squad
(Japan) 1964	Did not qualify							
(Mexico) 1968	Did not qualify							
(West Germany) 1972	Champions	7	6	1	0	21	5	Squad
(Canada) 1976	Runners-up	5	3	1	1	11	5	Squad
(Soviet Union) 1980	Did not qualify							
(United States) 1984	Did not qualify							
(South Korea) 1988	Did not qualify							
Since 1992	See Poland Olympic football team							
Total	6/22	22	13	2	7	52	33	—

==== Match history ====
Olympic Games history
Year	Round	Opponent	Score	Result
(France) 1924	First round	Hungary	0–5	Loss
(Nazi Germany) 1936	First round	Hungary	3–0	Win
(Nazi Germany) 1936	Quarter-finals	Great Britain	5–4	Win
(Nazi Germany) 1936	Semi-finals	Austria	1–3	Loss
(Nazi Germany) 1936	Bronze medal match	Norway	2–3	Loss
(Finland) 1952	Preliminary round	France	2–1	Win
(Finland) 1952	First round	Denmark	0–2	Loss
(Italy) 1960	Group stage	Tunisia	6–1	Win
(Italy) 1960	Group stage	Denmark	1–2	Loss
(Italy) 1960	Group stage	Argentina	0–2	Loss
(West Germany) 1972	Group stage	Colombia	5–1	Win
(West Germany) 1972	Group stage	Ghana	4–0	Win
(West Germany) 1972	Group stage	East Germany	2–1	Win
(West Germany) 1972	Second round	Denmark	1–1	Draw
(West Germany) 1972	Second round	Soviet Union	2–1	Win
(West Germany) 1972	Second round	Morocco	5–0	Win
(West Germany) 1972	Gold medal match	Hungary	2–1	Win
(Canada) 1976	Group stage	Cuba	0–0	Draw
(Canada) 1976	Group stage	Iran	3–2	Win
(Canada) 1976	Quarter-finals	North Korea	5–0	Win
(Canada) 1976	Semi-finals	Brazil	2–0	Win
(Canada) 1976	Gold medal match	East Germany	1–3	Loss

=== UEFA European Championship ===
UEFA European Championship record										Qualification record						
Year	Result	Pos	Pld	W	D	L	GF	GA	Squad	Pos	Pld	W	D	L	GF	GA
(France) 1960	Did not qualify									R16	2	0	2	2	7	7
(Spain) 1964	Did not qualify									PR	2	0	2	0	4	4
(Italy) 1968	Did not qualify									3rd	6	3	1	2	13	9
(Belgium) 1972	Did not qualify									2nd	6	2	2	2	10	6
(Socialist Federal Republic of Yugoslavia) 1976	Did not qualify									2nd	6	3	2	1	9	5
(Italy) 1980	Did not qualify									2nd	8	5	2	1	13	4
(France) 1984	Did not qualify									3rd	6	1	2	3	6	9
(West Germany) 1988	Did not qualify									4th	8	3	2	3	9	11
(Sweden) 1992	Did not qualify									3rd	6	2	3	1	8	6
(England) 1996	Did not qualify									4th	10	3	4	3	14	12
(Belgium) (Netherlands) 2000	Did not qualify									3rd	8	4	1	3	12	8
(Portugal) 2004	Did not qualify									3rd	8	4	1	3	11	7
(Austria) (Switzerland) 2008	Group stage	14th	3	0	1	2	1	4	Squad	1st	14	8	4	2	24	12
(Poland) (Ukraine) 2012	Group stage	14th	3	0	2	1	2	3	Squad	Qualified as co-hosts						
(France) 2016	Quarter-finals	5th	5	2	3	0	4	2	Squad	2nd	10	6	3	1	33	10
(Europe) 2020	Group stage	21st	3	0	1	2	4	6	Squad	1st	10	8	1	1	18	5
(Germany) 2024	Group stage	23rd	3	0	1	2	3	6	Squad	3rd (P/O)	10	10	4	3	3	15
(England) (Scotland) (Republic of Ireland) (Wales) 2028	To be determined									To be determined						
(Italy) (Turkey) 2032	To be determined									To be determined						
Total	Quarter-finals	5/17	17	2	8	7	14	21	—	—	120	56	31	33	197	126

==== Match history ====
UEFA European Championship history
Year	Round	Opponent	Score	Result
(Austria) (Switzerland) 2008	Group stage	Germany	0–2	Loss
(Austria) (Switzerland) 2008	Group stage	Austria	1–1	Draw
(Austria) (Switzerland) 2008	Group stage	Croatia	0–1	Loss
(Poland) (Ukraine) 2012	Group stage	Greece	1–1	Draw
(Poland) (Ukraine) 2012	Group stage	Russia	1–1	Draw
(Poland) (Ukraine) 2012	Group stage	Czech Republic	0–1	Loss
(France) 2016	Group stage	Northern Ireland	1–0	Win
(France) 2016	Group stage	Germany	0–0	Draw
(France) 2016	Group stage	Ukraine	1–0	Win
(France) 2016	Round of 16	Switzerland	1–1	Draw (Win)
(France) 2016	Quarter-finals	Portugal	1–1	Draw (Loss)
(Europe) 2020	Group stage	Slovakia	1–2	Loss
(Europe) 2020	Group stage	Spain	1–1	Draw
(Europe) 2020	Group stage	Sweden	2–3	Loss
(Germany) 2024	Group stage	Netherlands	1–2	Loss
(Germany) 2024	Group stage	Austria	1–3	Loss
(Germany) 2024	Group stage	France	1–1	Draw

=== UEFA Nations League ===
UEFA Nations League record											Finals record									
Season	Division	Group	Pld	W	D	L	GF	GA	P/R	Rank	Year	Round	Position	Pld	W	D	L	GF	GA	Squad
2018–19	A	3	4	0	2	2	4	6	Same position	10th	(Portugal) 2019	Did not qualify								
2020–21	A	1	6	2	1	3	6	6	Same position	10th	(Italy) 2021	Did not qualify								
2022–23	A	4	6	2	1	3	6	12	Same position	11th	(Netherlands) 2023	Did not qualify								
2024–25	A	1	6	1	1	4	9	16	▼	13th	(Germany) 2025	Did not qualify								
2026–27	B	4	4	1	1	2	7	4	TBD	TBD	2027	Not eligible								
Total			26	6	6	14	32	44	—		Total			0	0	0	0	0	0	—

==== Match history ====
UEFA Nations League history
Season	Round	Opponent	Score	Result
(Portugal) 2018–19	Group stage	Italy	1–1	Draw
(Portugal) 2018–19	Group stage	Portugal	2–3	Loss
(Portugal) 2018–19	Group stage	Italy	0–1	Loss
(Portugal) 2018–19	Group stage	Portugal	1–1	Draw
(Italy) 2020–21	Group stage	Netherlands	0–1	Loss
(Italy) 2020–21	Group stage	Bosnia and Herzegovina	2–1	Win
(Italy) 2020–21	Group stage	Italy	0–0	Draw
(Italy) 2020–21	Group stage	Bosnia and Herzegovina	3–0	Win
(Italy) 2020–21	Group stage	Italy	0–2	Loss
(Italy) 2020–21	Group stage	Netherlands	1–2	Loss
(Netherlands) 2022–23	Group stage	Wales	2–1	Win
(Netherlands) 2022–23	Group stage	Belgium	1–6	Loss
(Netherlands) 2022–23	Group stage	Netherlands	2–2	Draw
(Netherlands) 2022–23	Group stage	Belgium	0–1	Loss
(Netherlands) 2022–23	Group stage	Netherlands	0–2	Loss
(Netherlands) 2022–23	Group stage	Wales	1–0	Win
(Germany) 2024–25	Group stage	Scotland	3–2	Win
(Germany) 2024–25	Group stage	Croatia	0–1	Loss
(Germany) 2024–25	Group stage	Portugal	1–3	Loss
(Germany) 2024–25	Group stage	Croatia	3–3	Draw
(Germany) 2024–25	Group stage	Portugal	1–5	Loss
(Germany) 2024–25	Group stage	Scotland	1–2	Loss
2026–27	Group stage	Bosnia and Herzegovina	0–0	Draw
2026–27	Group stage	Sweden	1–3	Loss
2026–27	Group stage	Romania	6–0	Win
2026–27	Group stage	Bosnia and Herzegovina	0–1	Loss
2026–27	Group stage	Romania	1–2	Loss

=== FIFA rankings history ===
Key
Highest FIFA ranking
Lowest FIFA ranking

1993	1994	1995	1996	1997	1998	1999	2000	2001	2002	2003	2004	2005	2006	2007	2008	2009	2010	2011	2012	2013	2014	2015	2016	2017	2018	2019	2020	2021	2022	2023	2024	2025
28	29	33	53	48	31	32	43	33	34	25	25	22	24	22	34	58	73	66	55	76	41	34	15	7	20	19	19	27	22	31	35	31

== Head-to-head record ==
Statistics updated as of 17 November 2026 after match against Sweden. List including all matches officially recognized by the Polish Football Association (also those not recognized by FIFA).

Key
Positive balance (more Wins)
Neutral balance (Wins = Losses)
Negative balance (more Losses)

Opponent	Pld	W	D	L	GF	GA	GD	Confederation	%Won
Albania	16	11	3	2	22	11	+11	UEFA	69%
Algeria	2	2	0	0	6	1	+5	CAF	100%
Andorra	3	3	0	0	11	1	+10	UEFA	100%
Argentina	12	3	2	7	12	20	−8	CONMEBOL	25%
Armenia	7	5	1	1	15	4	+11	UEFA	71%
Australia	1	0	0	1	1	2	−1	AFC	0%
Austria	11	5	2	4	20	20	0	UEFA	45%
Azerbaijan	6	5	1	0	20	1	+19	UEFA	83%
Belarus	6	2	2	2	9	10	−1	UEFA	33%
Belgium	21	7	6	8	27	27	0	UEFA	33%
Bolivia	2	2	0	0	3	1	+2	CONMEBOL	100%
Bosnia and Herzegovina	7	4	2	1	9	4	+5	UEFA	57%
Brazil	12	1	2	9	19	37	−18	CONMEBOL	8%
Bulgaria	25	12	9	4	47	30	+17	UEFA	48%
Cameroon	3	0	2	1	0	3	−3	CAF	0%
Canada	6	6	0	0	20	4	+16	CONCACAF	100%
Chile	2	1	1	0	3	2	+1	CONMEBOL	50%
China	2	2	0	0	2	0	+2	AFC	100%
Colombia	6	2	0	4	8	10	−2	CONMEBOL	33%
Costa Rica	3	3	0	0	8	3	+5	CONCACAF	100%
Croatia	7	1	2	4	6	11	−5	UEFA	14%
Cuba	1	0	1	0	0	0	0	CONCACAF	0%
Cyprus	7	4	3	0	14	5	+9	UEFA	57%
Czech Republic/Czechoslovakia	29	8	6	15	39	56	−17	UEFA	28%
Denmark	23	8	2	13	38	49	−11	UEFA	35%
Ecuador	3	1	1	1	5	4	+1	CONMEBOL	33%
Egypt	2	0	1	1	0	4	−4	CAF	0%
England	21	1	8	12	13	33	−20	UEFA	5%
Estonia	10	8	1	1	23	5	+18	UEFA	80%
Faroe Islands	5	5	0	0	16	1	+15	UEFA	100%
Finland	35	23	8	4	86	32	+54	UEFA	66%
France	18	3	6	9	20	31	−11	UEFA	17%
Georgia	5	4	0	1	13	4	+9	UEFA	80%
East Germany	19	9	4	6	26	27	−1	UEFA	47%
Germany / West Germany	22	2	7	13	12	34	−22	UEFA	9%
Ghana	1	1	0	0	4	0	+4	CAF	100%
Gibraltar	2	2	0	0	15	1	+14	UEFA	100%
Greece	17	10	4	3	30	12	+18	UEFA	59%
Guatemala	2	1	1	0	3	2	+1	CONCACAF	50%
Haiti	3	2	0	1	11	3	+8	CONCACAF	67%
Hungary	34	8	5	21	43	92	−49	UEFA	24%
Iceland	7	5	2	0	15	7	+8	UEFA	71%
India	1	1	0	0	2	1	+1	AFC	100%
Iran	3	3	0	0	6	2	+4	AFC	100%
Iraq	5	2	2	1	7	3	+4	AFC	40%
Republic of Ireland	28	11	11	6	44	30	+14	UEFA	39%
Israel	13	7	4	2	32	15	+17	UEFA	54%
Italy	18	3	8	7	10	23	−13	UEFA	17%
Ivory Coast	1	1	0	0	3	1	+2	CAF	100%
Japan	7	5	0	2	14	10	+4	AFC	71%
Kazakhstan	5	4	1	0	12	3	+9	UEFA	80%
North Korea	2	1	1	0	7	2	+5	AFC	50%
South Korea	3	1	1	1	5	6	−1	AFC	33%
Kuwait	2	1	1	0	3	1	+2	AFC	50%
Latvia	16	12	2	2	42	15	+27	UEFA	75%
Libya	1	1	0	0	5	0	+5	CAF	100%
Liechtenstein	1	1	0	0	2	0	+2	UEFA	100%
Lithuania	13	7	4	2	20	8	+11	UEFA	62%
Luxembourg	7	6	1	0	26	5	+21	UEFA	86%
North Macedonia	5	4	1	0	11	2	+9	UEFA	80%
Malta	6	6	0	0	18	2	+16	UEFA	100%
Mexico	9	3	3	3	9	13	−4	CONCACAF	33%
Moldova	9	6	2	1	15	6	+9	UEFA	67%
Montenegro	4	2	2	0	9	6	+3	UEFA	50%
Morocco	5	2	2	1	9	3	+6	CAF	40%
Netherlands	22	3	9	10	22	32	−10	UEFA	14%
New Zealand	3	2	1	0	3	0	+3	OFC	83%
Nigeria	2	0	1	1	2	3	−1	CAF	0%
Northern Ireland	10	4	2	4	14	13	+1	UEFA	40%
Norway	19	12	3	4	58	26	+32	UEFA	63%
Paraguay	1	0	0	1	0	4	−4	CONMEBOL	0%
Peru	3	3	0	0	9	2	+7	CONMEBOL	100%
Portugal	15	3	5	7	15	26	−11	UEFA	20%
Romania	38	8	15	15	64	58	+6	UEFA	21%
Russia / Soviet Union	19	4	6	9	18	34	−16	UEFA	21%
San Marino	10	10	0	0	45	2	+43	UEFA	100%
Saudi Arabia	4	4	0	0	7	2	+5	AFC	100%
Scotland	13	4	6	3	19	18	+1	UEFA	31%
Senegal	1	0	0	1	1	2	−1	CAF	0%
Serbia / Yugoslavia	26	10	7	9	51	54	−3	UEFA	38%
Singapore	1	1	0	0	6	1	+5	AFC	100%
Slovakia	9	3	1	5	14	14	0	UEFA	33%
Slovenia	8	3	3	2	9	9	0	UEFA	38%
South Africa	2	1	0	1	1	1	0	CAF	50%
Spain	11	1	2	8	9	28	−19	UEFA	9%
Sweden	31	9	5	17	45	66	-21	UEFA	29%
Switzerland	11	4	6	1	21	12	+9	UEFA	36%
Thailand	1	1	0	0	3	1	+2	AFC	100%
Tunisia	4	3	0	1	9	2	+7	CAF	75%
Turkey	18	12	3	3	41	13	+28	UEFA	67%
Ukraine	11	5	2	4	14	12	+2	UEFA	45%
United Arab Emirates	2	2	0	0	9	2	+7	AFC	100%
Uruguay	4	1	2	1	4	5	−1	CONMEBOL	25%
United States	17	7	3	7	36	22	+14	CONCACAF	41%
Wales	11	7	3	1	13	6	+7	UEFA	64%
Total	917	399	225	293	1562	1231	+331	FIFA	44%

== Honours ==
=== Global ===
- FIFA World Cup
  - Third place: 1974, 1982
- Olympic Games
  - Champions: 1972
  - Runners-up: 1976, 1992

=== Summary ===
Competition	1st place, gold medalist(s)	2nd place, silver medalist(s)	3rd place, bronze medalist(s)	Total
FIFA World Cup	0	0	2	2
Olympic Games	1	2	0	3
Total	1	2	2	5
