= Molęda =

Molęda or Moleda is a Polish-language surname, a variant of Molenda. The word molenda used to mean miller, from Latin molendinator.

Notable people with this surname include:

- Cezary Moleda, (born 1960), Polish football manager
- Jakub Molęda (born 1984), Polish singer, composer and theatre actor
- Małgorzata Molęda-Zdziech, Polish sociologist
- Maciej Molęda (born 1976), Polish singer, composer and songwriter
- Mateusz Molęda (born 1986), German-Polish conductor
