= Jean Franco Sarmiento =

Colombian footballer (born 1997)

Personal information
- Full name: Jean Franco Sarmiento Campo
- Date of birth: 7 February 1997 (age 29)
- Place of birth: Santa Marta, Colombia
- Height: 1.82 m (6 ft 0 in)
- Position: Forward

Team information
- Current team: JKS Jarosław

Youth career
- Águilas Doradas

Senior career*
Years	Team	Apps	(Gls)
2016	Águilas Doradas	0	(0)
2019–2020	Tigres FC	30	(2)
2021–2023	Pogoń Grodzisk Mazowiecki	59	(35)
2023–2024	Radomiak Radom	12	(0)
2023–2024	→ Odra Opole (loan)	22	(5)
2025–2026	Polonia Bytom	38	(3)
2026–	JKS Jarosław	0	(0)
- * Club domestic league appearances and goals as of 08:45, 27 May 2026 (UTC)

Jean Franco Sarmiento Campo (born 7 February 1997) is a Colombian professional footballer who plays as a forward for III liga club JKS Jarosław.

== Early life ==
Sarmiento was born on 7 February 1997 in Santa Marta, Colombia, a city of which he is a native of, and has three sisters. Growing up, he regarded Colombia international Radamel Falcao as his football idol.

== Career ==
As a youth player, Sarmiento joined the youth academy of Colombian side Águilas Doradas, where he started his senior career. Following his stint there, he signed for Colombian side Tigres FC. Ahead of the second half of the 2020–21 season, he signed for Polish side Pogoń Grodzisk Mazowiecki, helping the club achieve promotion from the Polish fourth tier to the third tier. In 2023, he signed for Ekstraklasa side Radomiak Radom. The same year, he was sent on loan to second-tier club Odra Opole.

On 22 January 2025, Sarmiento joined II liga club Polonia Bytom on an eighteen-month deal.

On 26 August 2026, Sarmiento signed with fourth-tier side JKS Jarosław.

== Style of play ==
Sarmiento can play as a forward, winger, or midfielder. Former Pogoń Grodzisk Mazowiecki manager Krzysztof Chrobak described him as a "player with great individual skills, good technique and 1 vs 1 play. He has a flair for combination play. Jean's strong point is the ability to block, keep the ball, which is hard to take away from him".

== Honours ==
Pogoń Grodzisk Mazowiecki

- III liga, group I: 2020–21

Polonia Bytom

- II liga: 2024–25
