= Krzysztof Kamiński =

Polish footballer

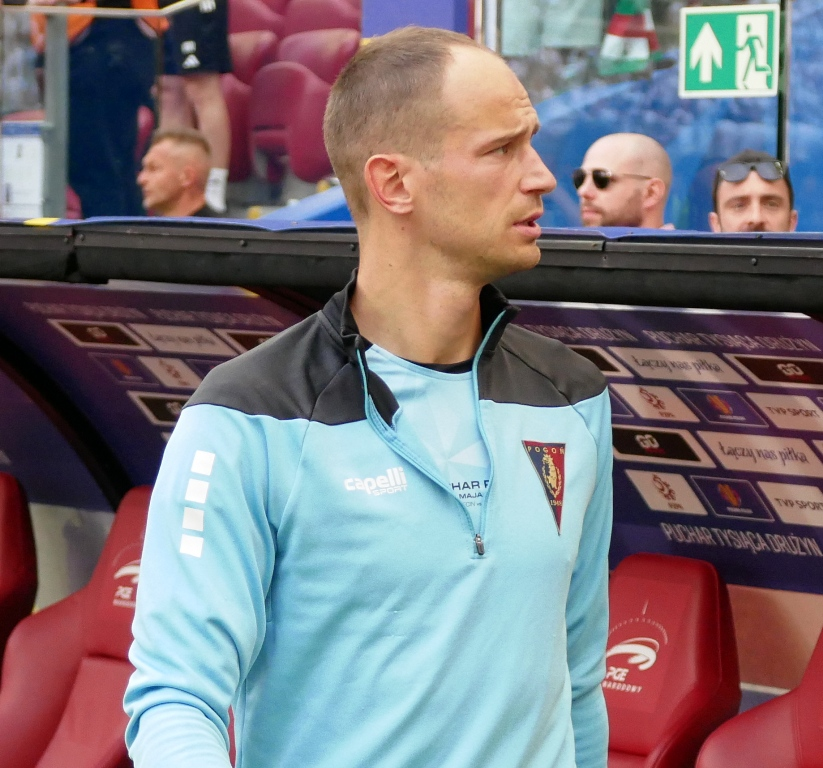
- Kamiński with Pogoń Szczecin in 2025

Personal information
- Full name: Krzysztof Kamiński
- Date of birth: 26 November 1990 (age 35)
- Place of birth: Nowy Dwór Mazowiecki, Poland
- Height: 1.91 m (6 ft 3 in)
- Position: Goalkeeper

Team information
- Current team: Pogoń Grodzisk Mazowiecki
- Number: 1

Youth career
- –2008: KS Łomianki

Senior career*
Years	Team	Apps	(Gls)
2008–2009	KS Łomianki		
2009	Narew Ostrołęka	6	(0)
2010	Pogoń Siedlce	12	(0)
2010–2012	Wisła Płock	58	(0)
2012–2015	Ruch Chorzów	35	(0)
2015–2019	Júbilo Iwata	152	(0)
2020–2024	Wisła Płock	98	(0)
2023	→ Ruch Chorzów (loan)	8	(0)
2024–2026	Pogoń Szczecin	4	(0)
2024–2025	Pogoń Szczecin II	4	(0)
2026–	Pogoń Grodzisk Mazowiecki	0	(0)

International career
2012	Poland U21	1	(0)
- * Club domestic league appearances and goals as of 09:54, 30 May 2026 (UTC)

Krzysztof Kamiński (born 26 November 1990) is a Polish professional footballer who plays as a goalkeeper for I liga club Pogoń Grodzisk Mazowiecki.

== Career statistics ==
As of match played 23 May 2026

Appearances and goals by club, season and competition
Club	Season	League			National cup (Note: Includes Polish Cup)		League cup (Note: Includes J.League Cup)		Continental		Total	
Club	Season	Division	Apps	Goals	Apps	Goals	Apps	Goals	Apps	Goals	Apps	Goals
Narew Ostrołęka	2009–10	III liga, gr. A	6	0	—		—		—		6	0
Pogoń Siedlce	2009–10	III liga, gr. A	12	0	—		—		—		12	0
Wisła Płock	2010–11	II liga East	30	0	1	0	—		—		31	0
Wisła Płock	2011–12	I liga	28	0	1	0	—		—		29	0
Wisła Płock	Total		58	0	2	0	—		—		60	0
Ruch Chorzów	2012–13	Ekstraklasa	6	0	2	0	—		—		8	0
Ruch Chorzów	2013–14	Ekstraklasa	10	0	1	0	—		—		11	0
Ruch Chorzów	2014–15	Ekstraklasa	19	0	1	0	—		6 (Note: Appearances in UEFA Europa League)	0	26	0
Ruch Chorzów	Total		35	0	4	0	—		6	0	45	0
Júbilo Iwata	2015	J2 League	41	0	0	0	—		—		41	0
Júbilo Iwata	2016	J1 League	20	0	0	0	0	0	—		20	0
Júbilo Iwata	2017	J1 League	33	0	0	0	0	0	—		33	0
Júbilo Iwata	2018	J1 League	32	0	0	0	1	0	—		33	0
Júbilo Iwata	2019	J1 League	26	0	0	0	0	0	—		26	0
Júbilo Iwata	Total		152	0	0	0	1	0	—		153	0
Wisła Płock	2019–20	Ekstraklasa	9	0	—		—		—		9	0
Wisła Płock	2020–21	Ekstraklasa	29	0	2	0	—		—		31	0
Wisła Płock	2021–22	Ekstraklasa	29	0	0	0	—		—		29	0
Wisła Płock	2022–23	Ekstraklasa	20	0	1	0	—		—		21	0
Wisła Płock	2023–24	I liga	11	0	1	0	—		—		12	0
Wisła Płock	Total		98	0	4	0	—		—		102	0
Ruch Chorzów (loan)	2023–24	Ekstraklasa	8	0	—		—		—		8	0
Pogoń Szczecin	2024–25	Ekstraklasa	0	0	3	0	—		—		3	0
Pogoń Szczecin	2025–26	Ekstraklasa	4	0	0	0	—		—		4	0
Pogoń Szczecin	Total		4	0	3	0	—		—		7	0
Pogoń Szczecin II	2024–25	III liga, gr. II	4	0	—		—		—		4	0
Pogoń Grodzisk Mazowiecki	2026–27	I liga	0	0	0	0	—		—		0	0
Career total			377	0	13	0	1	0	6	0	397	0
