= Artur Rozmus =

Polish footballer

Personal information
- Date of birth: 1 November 1977 (age 48)
- Place of birth: Poland
- Height: 1.77 m (5 ft 10 in)
- Position: Striker

Senior career*
Years	Team	Apps	(Gls)
1994–1995	Stal Nowa Dęba		
1995–1998	Siarka Tarnobrzeg		
1998–1999	GKS Jastrzębie		
1999–2000	Beskid Skoczów		
2001	BBTS Bielsko-Biala		
2001	Odra Wodzisław Śląski	4	(0)
2001–2004	Włókniarz Kietrz		
2004–2005	Podbeskidzie Bielsko-Biała	20	(4)
2005–2007	Polonia Bytom	63	(17)
2008–2009	Ilanka Rzepin	20	(11)
2009	Narew Ostrołęka	12	(4)
2012	Beskid 09 Skoczów		
- * Club domestic league appearances and goals

Artur Rozmus (born 1 November 1977) is a Polish former professional footballer who played as a striker.
