= Maciej Rybaczuk =

Polish footballer

Personal information
- Date of birth: 27 November 1983 (age 42)
- Place of birth: Warsaw, Poland
- Height: 1.81 m (5 ft 11 in)
- Position: Defender

Senior career*
Years	Team	Apps	(Gls)
- SEMP Ursynów
2001–2005	Delta Warsaw		
2005–2011	Znicz Pruszków		
2011–2014	Pogoń Grodzisk Mazowiecki		
2014–2017	KS Konstancin		
2017–2018	Błonianka Błonie	28	(6)
- * Club domestic league appearances and goals

Maciej Rybaczuk (born 27 November 1983) is a Polish former professional footballer who played as a defender.
