= 2026–27 I liga =

79th season of the second tier football league in Poland

I liga
- Season: 2026–27
- Dates: 24 July 2026 – 6 June 2027
- Matches: 126
- Goals: 340 (2.7 per match)
- Highest attendance: 37,501; Lechia 2–1 Arka (18 October 2026)
- All statistics correct as of 9 November 2026.

The 2026–27 I liga (also known as Betclic I liga for sponsorship reasons) is the 79th season of the second tier domestic division in the Polish football league system since its establishment in 1949 and the 19th season of the Polish I liga under its current title. The league is operated by the PZPN.

== Season overview ==
The season started on 24 July 2026 and will go into the winter break after the 18th matchday on 12 December. With the 19th matchday, the season will continue on 6 February 2027. The final 34th matchday is scheduled for 29 May 2027.

The regular season is being played as a round-robin tournament. A total of 18 teams participate, 12 of which competed in the league campaign during the previous season, while three to be relegated from the 2025–26 Ekstraklasa and the remaining three to be promoted from the 2025–26 II liga. Each team will play a total of 34 matches, half at home and half away.

== Teams ==
A total of 18 teams will participate in the 2026–27 edition of the I liga.

=== Changes from last season ===
The following teams have changed division since the 2025–26 season.

==== To I liga ====
Relegated from 2025–26 Ekstraklasa	Promoted from 2025–26 II liga
▼ Lechia Gdańsk (16th) ▼ Arka Gdynia (17th) ▼ Bruk-Bet Termalica Nieciecza (18th)	▲ Unia Skierniewice (1st) ▲ Warta Poznań (2nd) ▲ Podbeskidzie Bielsko-Biała (PO)

==== From I liga ====
Promoted to 2026–27 Ekstraklasa	Relegated to 2026–27 II liga
▲ Wisła Kraków (1st) ▲ Śląsk Wrocław (2nd) ▲ Wieczysta Kraków (PO)	▼ Znicz Pruszków (16th) ▼ Górnik Łęczna 17th) ▼GKS Tychy (18th)

=== Stadiums and locations ===
Location of teams in 2025–26 I liga.

Note: Table lists in alphabetical order.

Team	Location	Venue	Capacity
Arka Gdynia	Gdynia	GOSiR Stadium	15,139
Bruk-Bet Termalica Nieciecza	Nieciecza	Bruk-Bet Stadium	4,666
Chrobry Głogów	Głogów	GOS Stadium	2,817
Lechia Gdańsk	Gdańsk	Polsat Plus Arena Gdańsk	41,620
ŁKS Łódź	Łódź	Władysław Król Stadium	18,029
Miedź Legnica	Legnica	White Eagle Stadium	6,864
Odra Opole	Opole	Itaka Arena	11,600
Podbeskidzie Bielsko-Biała	Bielsko-Biała	BBOSiR Stadium	15,316
Pogoń Grodzisk Mazowiecki^{1}	Grodzisk Mazowiecki; Pruszków	Municipal Sports Stadium; MZOS Stadium	1,000; 1,977
Pogoń Siedlce	Siedlce	ROSRRiT Stadium	2,901
Polonia Bytom	Bytom	Polonia Bytom Stadium	2,220
Polonia Warsaw	Warsaw	General Kazimierz Sosnkowski Stadium	7,150
Puszcza Niepołomice	Niepołomice	Puszcza Stadium	2,118
Ruch Chorzów	Chorzów	Superauto.pl Silesian Stadium^{2}	54,378
Stal Mielec	Mielec	Grzegorz Lato Stadium	6,864
Stal Rzeszów	Rzeszów	Stal Stadium	11,547
Unia Skierniewice	Skierniewice	Municipal Stadium	3,000
Warta Poznań	Poznań	Ogródek by TedGifted.com	1,600

1. Due to accommodating Municipal Sports Stadium to I liga regulations, Pogoń Grodzisk Mazowiecki host their matches in Pruszków.
2. Due to construction of the new Ruch Chorzów Stadium, Ruch Chorzów host their games at the Silesian Stadium..

=== Managerial changes ===
Team	Outgoing manager	Manner of departure	Date of vacancy	Position in table	Incoming manager	Date of appointment
Arka Gdynia	(Poland) Dariusz Banasik	Mutual consent	23 May 2026	Pre-season	(Czech Republic) Marek Jarolím	17 June 2026
Lechia Gdańsk	(England) John Carver	Mutual consent	23 May 2026	Pre-season	(Ukraine) Vladyslav Lupashko	1 July 2026
Polonia Warsaw	(Poland) Mariusz Pawlak	Mutual consent	30 May 2026	Pre-season	(Poland) Piotr Stokowiec	1 July 2026
Odra Opole	(Poland) Piotr Plewnia	End of caretaker spell	1 June 2026	Pre-season	(Poland) Łukasz Tomczyk	2 June 2026
Pogoń Grodzisk Mazowiecki	(Poland) Piotr Stokowiec	End of contract	30 June 2026	Pre-season	(Poland) Tomasz Kafarski	1 July 2026
Polonia Bytom	(Poland) Wojciech Mróz	End of caretaker spell	30 June 2026	Pre-season	(Poland) Konrad Gerega	1 July 2026
Stal Mielec	(Poland) Ireneusz Mamrot	End of contract	30 June 2026	Pre-season	(Poland) Damian Skiba	1 July 2026
Miedź Legnica	(Poland) Janusz Niedźwiedź	Sacked	20 September 2026	5th	(Poland) Dawid Kroczek	23 September 2026
Arka Gdynia	(Czech Republic) Marek Jarolím	Sacked	22 September 2026	12th	(Poland) Tomasz Grzegorczyk	27 September 2026
Odra Opole	(Poland) Łukasz Tomczyk	Sacked	26 October 2026	17th	(Poland) Piotr Plewnia	27 October 2026

- Italics for interim managers.

== League table ==
Pos	Team	Pld	W	D	L	GF	GA	GD	Pts	Promotion or Relegation
1	Polonia Warsaw	14	7	4	3	23	15	+8	25	Promotion to Ekstraklasa
2	ŁKS Łódź	14	7	4	3	17	12	+5	25	Promotion to Ekstraklasa
3	Polonia Bytom	14	6	6	2	24	20	+4	24	Qualification for the promotion play-offs
4	Lechia Gdańsk	14	7	1	6	25	22	+3	22	Qualification for the promotion play-offs
5	Ruch Chorzów	14	6	4	4	17	14	+3	22	Qualification for the promotion play-offs
6	Bruk-Bet Termalica Nieciecza	14	6	4	4	22	20	+2	22	Qualification for the promotion play-offs
7	Pogoń Grodzisk Mazowiecki	14	6	3	5	20	14	+6	21	
8	Miedź Legnica	14	5	5	4	20	13	+7	20	
9	Warta Poznań	14	6	1	7	20	20	0	19	
10	Pogoń Siedlce	14	5	4	5	17	17	0	19	
11	Stal Mielec	14	5	4	5	19	27	−8	19	
12	Arka Gdynia	14	5	3	6	19	17	+2	18	
13	Stal Rzeszów	14	5	3	6	18	25	−7	18	
14	Chrobry Głogów	14	3	6	5	15	17	−2	15	
15	Podbeskidzie Bielsko-Biała	14	2	9	3	17	20	−3	15	
16	Puszcza Niepołomice	14	4	2	8	16	20	−4	14	Relegation to II liga
17	Unia Skierniewice	14	4	2	8	20	26	−6	14	Relegation to II liga
18	Odra Opole	14	3	3	8	11	21	−10	12	Relegation to II liga

Updated to match(es) played on 8 November 2026. Source: 1liga.org 90minut.pl
Rules for classification: 1) Points; 2) Head-to-head points; 3) Head-to-head goal difference; 4) Goal difference; 6) Goals scored; 7) Number of wins; 8) Number of away wins.
(Note: Head-to-head record is used only after all the matches between the teams in question have been played)

== Positions by round ==
Team ╲ Round	1	2	3	4	5	6	7	8	9	10	11	12	13	14	15	16	17	18	19	20	21	22	23	24	25	26	27	28	29	30	31	32	33	34
Polonia Warsaw	6	3	2	6	4	6	6	7	6	2	2	2	1	1																				
ŁKS Łódź	8	7	10	7	3	3	3	1	4	6	7	4	4	2																				
Polonia Bytom	4	10	9	13	15	15	14	16	15	13	10	9	6	3																				
Lechia Gdańsk	17	17	17	18	16	12	15	11	8	4	4	6	3	4																				
Ruch Chorzów	16	16	16	14	10	13	8	9	11	7	6	3	2	5																				
Bruk-Bet Termalica Nieciecza	3	3	6	9	11	11	7	4	2	3	3	5	7	6																				
Pogoń Grodzisk Mazowiecki	2	2	1	1	1	2	1	2	1	1	1	1	5	7																				
Miedź Legnica	8	5	8	5	2	1	2	3	5	8	8	7	8	8																				
Warta Poznań	12	9	4	8	6	7	9	6	3	5	5	8	9	9																				
Pogoń Siedlce	8	13	15	11	14	8	12	12	10	10	12	11	11	10																				
Stal Mielec	5	6	7	3	7	10	11	14	16	14	14	15	12	11																				
Arka Gdynia	6	1	5	2	5	5	5	8	12	16	15	12	13	12																				
Stal Rzeszów	18	18	18	17	18	18	13	10	7	9	9	10	10	13																				
Chrobry Głogów	1	8	3	4	8	4	4	5	9	11	11	14	15	14																				
Podbeskidzie Bielsko-Biała	8	12	11	12	13	17	16	17	17	15	16	13	14	15																				
Puszcza Niepołomice	14	14	12	15	17	14	17	18	18	18	18	16	16	16																				
Unia Skierniewice	13	15	13	16	12	16	18	15	13	17	17	18	18	17																				
Odra Opole	14	11	14	10	9	9	10	13	14	12	13	17	17	18																				

Promotion to Ekstraklasa
Qualification for promotion play-offs
Relegation to II liga

Updated to match(es) played on 8 November 2026. Source: 90minut.pl

== Results ==
Home \ Away	ARK	BBT	CHR	LEC	ŁKS	MIE	ODR	POD	PGM	PSI	PBY	PWA	PUS	RUC	SMI	SRZ	UNI	WAR
Arka Gdynia	—	3–1			1–1			3–1			1–1	1–2	3–0			4–0		
Bruk-Bet Termalica Nieciecza		—	2–2	2–1			1–0					1–3	2–0	2–0				1–2
Chrobry Głogów	0–0		—				0–1	1–1	0–4	0–0			0–2	2–0				0–1
Lechia Gdańsk	2–1			—		2–1	2–1		0–3	1–0					7–1		3–2	0–3
ŁKS Łódź		2–1	1–2		—			1–0			2–1	1–1		0–2	4–0	1–0		
Miedź Legnica	2–0	1–1	1–1		1–1	—		1–1	0–1						3–0	2–3		2–1
Odra Opole	0–1				0–0	1–0	—			0–1						0–1	3–5	3–1
Podbeskidzie Bielsko-Biała				2–2			1–1	—		1–0						2–1	1–1	1–1
Pogoń Grodzisk Mazowiecki	2–3	2–2			2–0				—			0–1	1–0		0–1	1–1		1–0
Pogoń Siedlce	2–1	1–2			1–1				2–1	—		1–0	1–3	1–1	2–0	3–4		
Polonia Bytom			3–2	1–0			3–0	0–0	2–2	2–2	—			0–0				4–3
Polonia Warsaw			2–0	2–4		1–1					2–2	—		1–1	1–1		3–1	
Puszcza Niepołomice				2–1	1–2	1–1	3–1	2–0			0–1	0–1	—				0–1	
Ruch Chorzów				1–0		0–2	3–0	3–3	2–0					—			3–1	1–2
Stal Mielec		1–2	0–0				1–1	3–3			5–2			2–0	—	1–1		2–1
Stal Rzeszów			1–5	1–2							4–0	2–1	2–2	0–1		—		
Unia Skierniewice	2–0	2–2				0–3			3–2	0–0	1–2				1–2	0–1	—	
Warta Poznań	3–0				0–1							0–3	3–2				1–0	—

Updated to match(es) played on 22 November 2026. Source: 1liga.org, 90minut.pl
Legend: Blue = home team win; Yellow = draw; Red = away team win.
For upcoming matches, an "a" indicates there is an article about the rivalry between the two participants.

== Results by round ==
Team ╲ Round	1	2	3	4	5	6	7	8	9	10	11	12	13	14	15	16	17	18	19	20	21	22	23	24	25	26	27	28	29	30	31	32	33	34
Arka Gdynia	W	W	L	W	L	D	D	L	L	L	L	W	D	W																				
Bruk-Bet Termalica Nieciecza	W	W	L	L	L	D	W	W	W	D	W	L	D	D																				
Chrobry Głogów	W	L	W	D	L	W	D	D	L	L	L	D	D	D																				
Lechia Gdańsk	L	L	D	L	W	W	L	W	W	W	W	L	W	L																				
ŁKS Łódź	D	W	L	W	W	D	D	W	L	L	W	W	D	W																				
Miedź Legnica	D	W	L	W	W	W	D	L	L	L	W	D	D	D																				
Odra Opole	L	W	L	W	D	D	D	L	L	W	L	L	L	L																				
Podbeskidzie Bielsko-Biała	D	D	D	D	D	L	D	D	D	W	L	W	D	L																				
Pogoń Grodzisk Mazowiecki	W	W	W	D	D	D	W	L	W	W	L	L	L	L																				
Pogoń Siedlce	D	L	D	W	L	W	D	W	L	L	L	W	D	W																				
Polonia Bytom	W	L	D	L	D	D	D	D	D	W	W	W	W	W																				
Polonia Warsaw	W	W	D	L	W	L	L	D	W	W	W	D	D	W																				
Puszcza Niepołomice	L	L	W	L	L	W	L	L	L	W	L	W	D	D																				
Ruch Chorzów	L	L	D	W	W	L	W	D	D	W	W	W	D	L																				
Stal Mielec	W	D	D	W	L	L	D	L	L	W	L	D	W	W																				
Stal Rzeszów	L	L	D	D	L	W	W	W	W	L	W	L	D	L																				
Unia Skierniewice	L	L	W	L	W	L	L	W	D	D	L	L	L	W																				
Warta Poznań	L	W	W	L	W	L	L	W	W	L	W	L	D	L																				

Updated to match(es) played on 8 November 2026. Source: 1liga.org, 90minut.pl
W = Win; D = Draw; L = Loss

== Promotion play-offs ==
I liga play-offs final for the 2026–27 season will be played on 6 June 2027. The teams who finish in 3rd, 4th, 5th and 6th place are set to compete. The fixtures will be determined by final league position – 3rd team of regular season vs 6th team of regular season and 4th team of regular season vs 5th team of regular season. The winner of final match will be promoted to the Ekstraklasa for next season. All matches will be played in a stadiums of team which occupied higher position in regular season.

Semi-finals; 3 June 2027
3
6
4
5

Final; 6 June 2027

== Season statistics ==
=== Top goalscorers ===
As of 8 November 2026.

Rank	Player	Club	Goals
1	(Latvia) Vladislavs Gutkovskis	Arka Gdynia	8
1	(Ukraine) Artur Shakh	Lechia Gdańsk	8
1	(Poland) Kamil Zapolnik	Bruk-Bet Termalica Nieciecza	8
4	(Poland) Konrad Andrzejczak	Polonia Bytom	6
5	(Poland) Bartosz Bida	Unia Skierniewice	5
5	(Poland) Szymon Kobusiński	Pogoń Siedlce	5
5	(Poland) Maciej Rosołek	Pogoń Siedlce	5
5	(Poland) Daniel Rumin	Polonia Bytom	5

== Attendances ==
Pos	Team	Total	High	Low	Average	Change
1	Lechia Gdańsk	77,768	37,501	5,744	11,110	−25.5%^{1}
2	Ruch Chorzów	60,894	12,224	7,409	10,149	−23.6%
3	Arka Gdynia	55,296	10,894	4,812	7,899	−25.6%^{1}
4	ŁKS Łódź	48,331	11,610	4,537	6,041	−12.9%
5	Odra Opole	31,287	7,177	2,468	4,470	−17.4%
6	Stal Rzeszów	15,461	4,427	1,792	3,092	+1.4%
7	Stal Mielec	23,626	5,561	1,568	2,953	−2.3%
8	Miedź Legnica	22,729	3,913	2,253	2,841	−7.5%
9	Bruk-Bet Termalica Nieciecza	19,629	4,595	2,037	2,804	−26.1%^{1}
10	Podbeskidzie Bielsko-Biała	16,490	4,216	1,896	2,748	+29.6%^{2}
11	Polonia Warsaw	15,485	3,448	1,860	2,581	+8.0%
12	Unia Skierniewice	17,905	2,963	2,234	2,558	+28.9%^{2}
13	Polonia Bytom	12,924	2,273	1,307	1,616	+29.5%
14	Warta Poznań	7,745	2,056	1,290	1,549	+84.0%^{2}
15	Pogoń Siedlce	12,360	2,077	812	1,373	−23.7%
16	Chrobry Głogów	8,887	2,112	737	1,270	+5.0%
17	Puszcza Niepołomice	9,603	1,453	834	1,200	−18.3%
18	Pogoń Grodzisk Mazowiecki	6,803	1,800	396	972	−0.7%
	League total	463,223	37,501	396	3,676	−31.1%

Updated to games played on 8 November 2026.
Source: 90minut.pl
Notes:
1. Team played last season in Ekstraklasa.
2. Team played last season in II liga.

== Awards ==
=== Monthly awards ===
==== Player of the Month ====
Month	Player	Team
July & August 2026	(Poland) Radosław Majewski	Pogoń Grodzisk Mazowiecki
September 2026	(Ukraine) Artur Shakh	Lechia Gdańsk
October 2026	(Poland) Michał Chrapek	Ruch Chorzów
November & December 2026		
February & March 2027		
April 2027		
May 2027		

==== Coach of the Month ====
Month	Coach	Team
July & August 2026	(Poland) Tomasz Kafarski	Pogoń Grodzisk Mazowiecki
September 2026	(Poland) Marek Zub	Stal Rzeszów
October 2026	(Poland) Waldemar Fornalik	Ruch Chorzów
November & December 2026		
February & March 2027		
April 2027		
May 2027		

== Number of teams by region ==
Number	Region	Team(s)
3	Masovian Voivodeship	Pogoń Grodzisk Mazowiecki, Pogoń Siedlce and Polonia Warsaw
3	Silesian Voivodeship	Podbeskidzie Bielsko-Biała, Polonia Bytom and Ruch Chorzów
2	Lesser Poland Voivodeship	Bruk-Bet Termalica Nieciecza and Puszcza Niepołomice
2	Lower Silesian Voivodeship	Chrobry Głogów and Miedź Legnica
2	Łódź Voivodeship	ŁKS Łódź and Unia Skierniewice
2	Podkarpackie Voivodeship	Stal Mielec and Stal Rzeszów
2	Pomeranian Voivodeship	Arka Gdynia and Lechia Gdańsk
1	Greater Poland Voivodeship	Warta Poznań
1	Opole Voivodeship	Odra Opole

== See also ==
- 2026–27 Ekstraklasa
- 2026–27 II liga
- 2026–27 III liga
- 2026–27 Polish Cup
- 2026 Polish Super Cup
