= Count Skarbków Park =

Park in Grodzisk Mazowiecki, Poland

Coordinates: 52°06′37″N 20°37′41″E

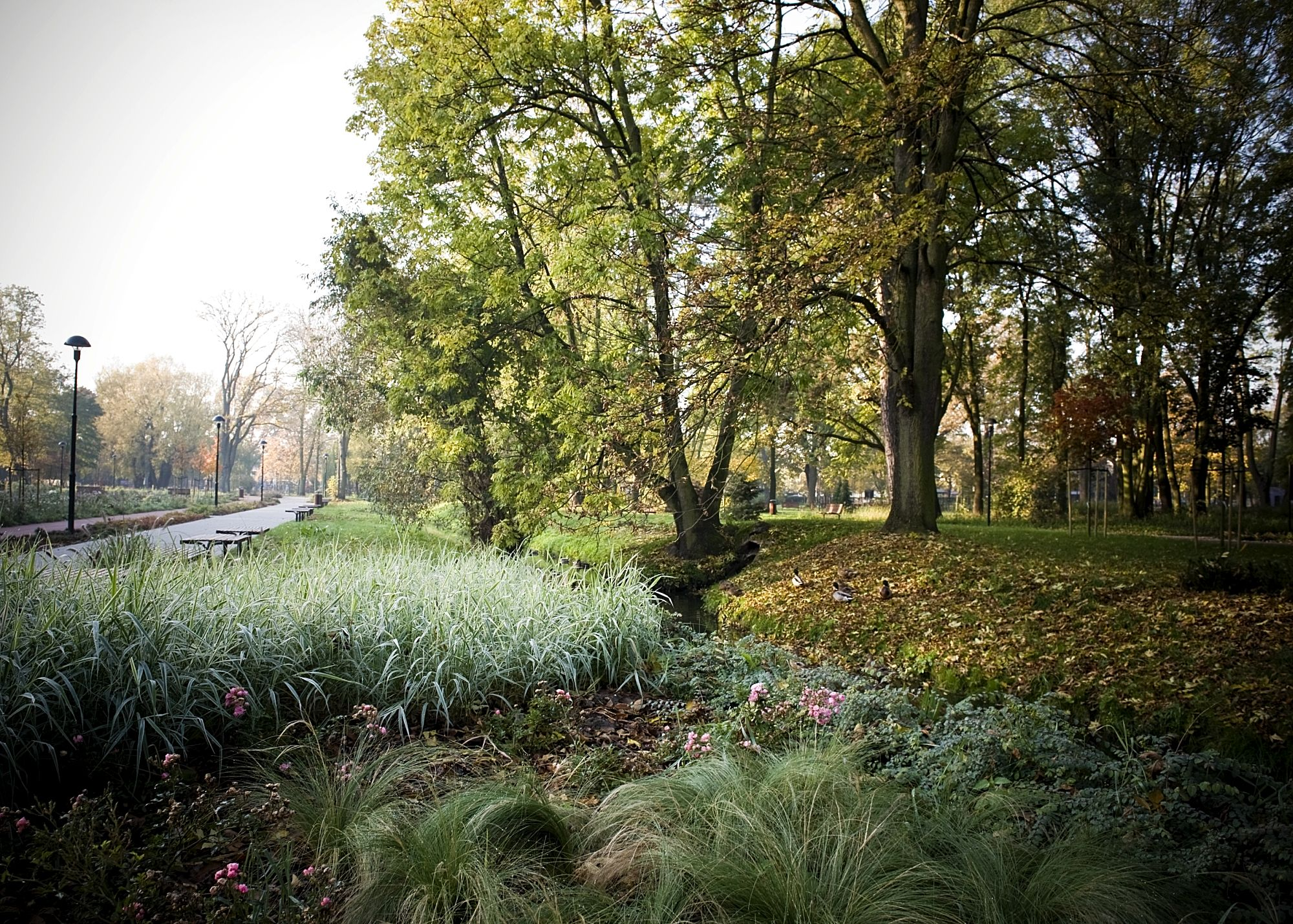
- Interactive map of Count Skarbków Park
- Area: 5.0005 ha (12.357 acres)
- Established: 18th century

Count Skarbków Park (formerly Zdrojowy) is a municipal park in Grodzisk Mazowiecki, Poland.

== Description ==
The park is located in the center of Grodzisk Mazowiecki, bordering the PKP grounds to the north and Foksal Villa, which houses the National Heritage Board of Poland. It borders 3-go Maja Street (south), Bartniaka Street (west), and Okulickiego Street (east). The park area is flat, covered with old trees (old oaks and bald cypress). The Rokicianka River, a tributary of the Rokitnica, flows through the park.

== History ==
The park was opened to residents around 1870. Before that, until the mid-19th century, it was part of the Jordanowickie gardens of the Mokroński family. Initially, the park was more extensive and had the character of a spa park. There was a Hydropathic Establishment for Society People. After World War II, the park area was reduced due to the city's development.

In 2012, the park underwent revitalization, enriching its compositional and spatial layout. As part of the revitalization, a new playground, a fountain, and an educational trail were built. The park was officially reopened after revitalization on July 22, 2012, on the 490th anniversary of Grodzisk receiving its city rights.

On June 19, 2022, a graduation tower was opened in the park. The graduation tower is eight meters high and has a volume of 920 m^{3}.

== Natural monuments ==
- Pedunculate oak Henryk (Quercus robur, circumference 463 cm)
- Pedunculate oak Aleksander (Quercus robur, circumference 283 cm)
- Common ash Hieronim (Fraxinus excelsior, circumference 247 cm)
- Common ash Wojciech (Fraxinus excelsior, circumference 275 cm)

== Gallery ==
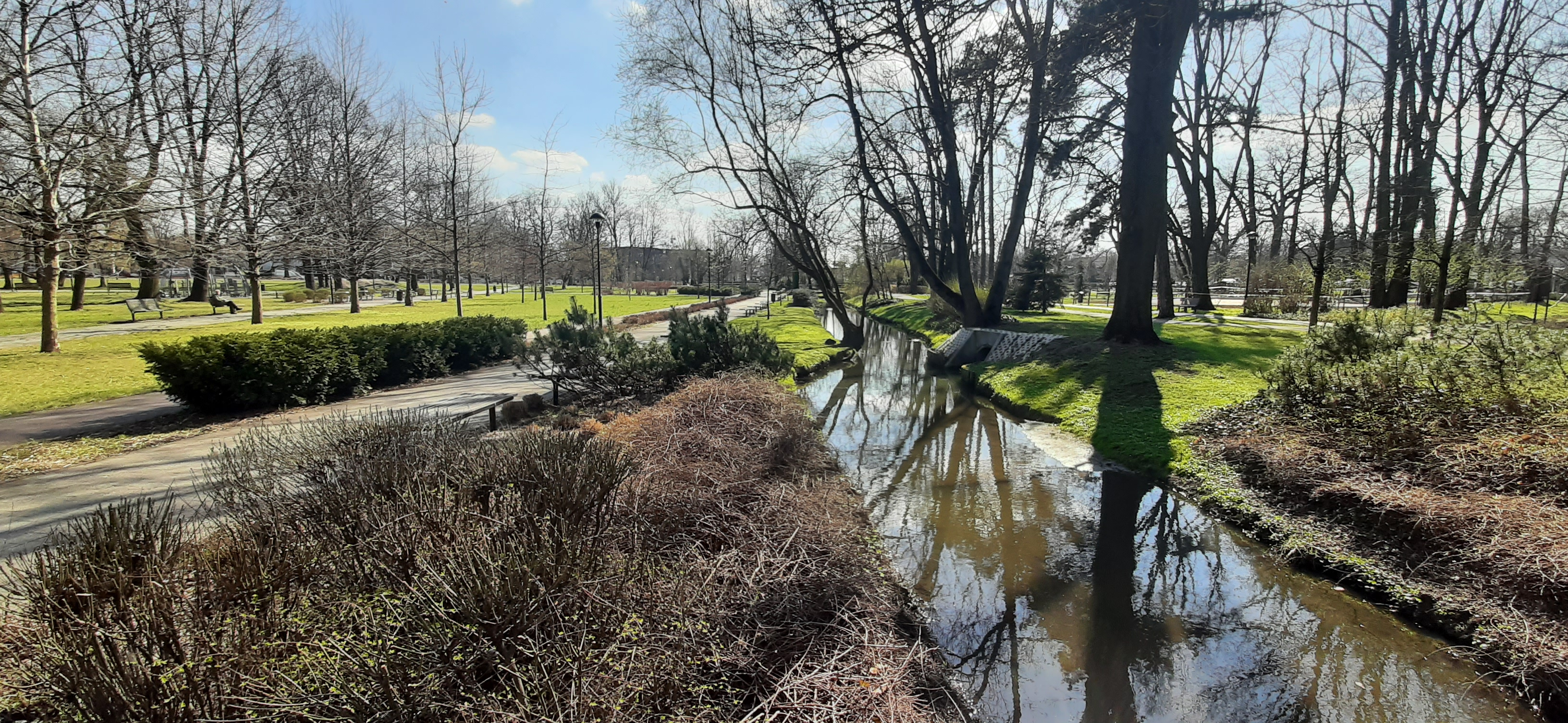
Rokicianka River

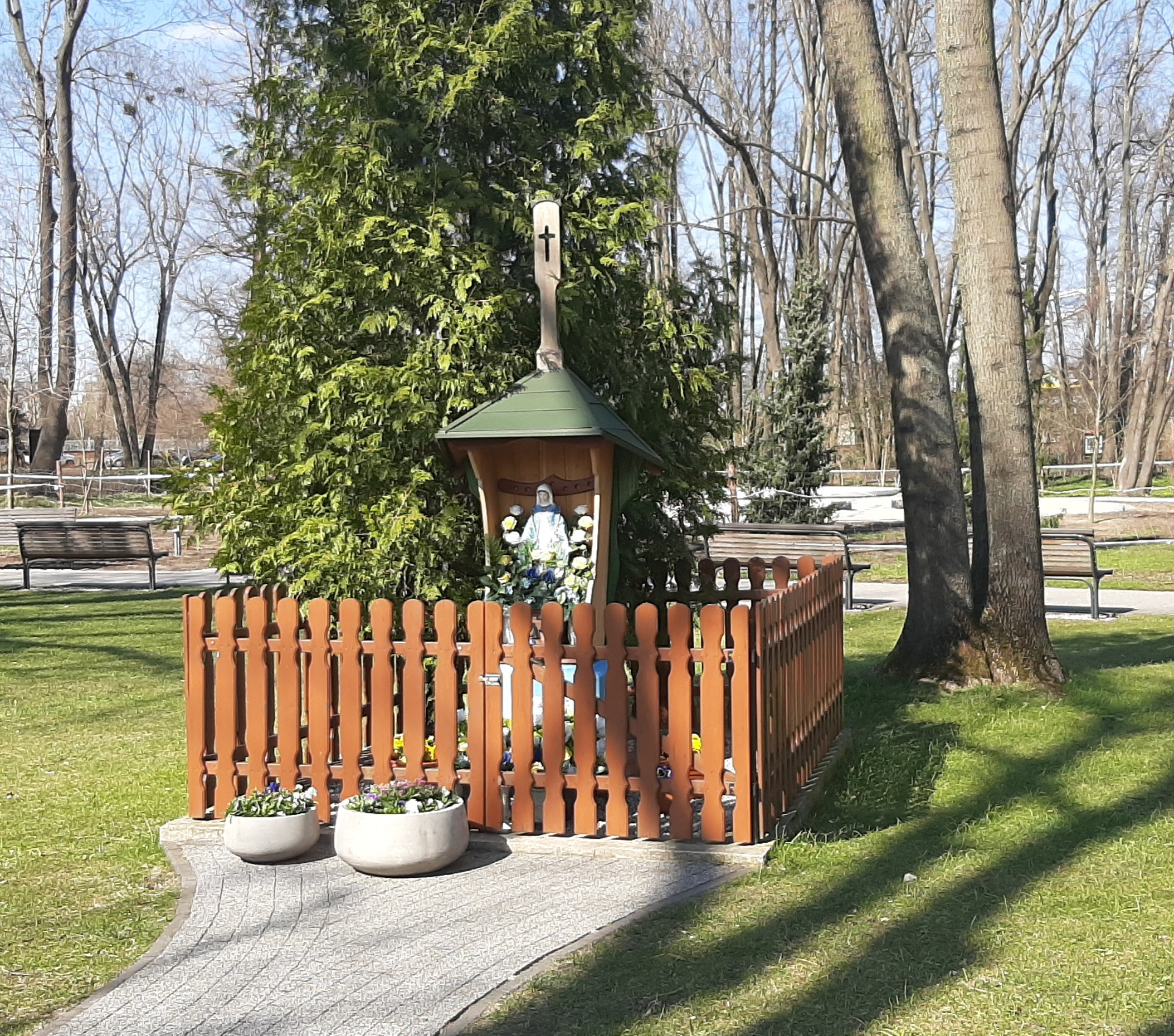
Chapel

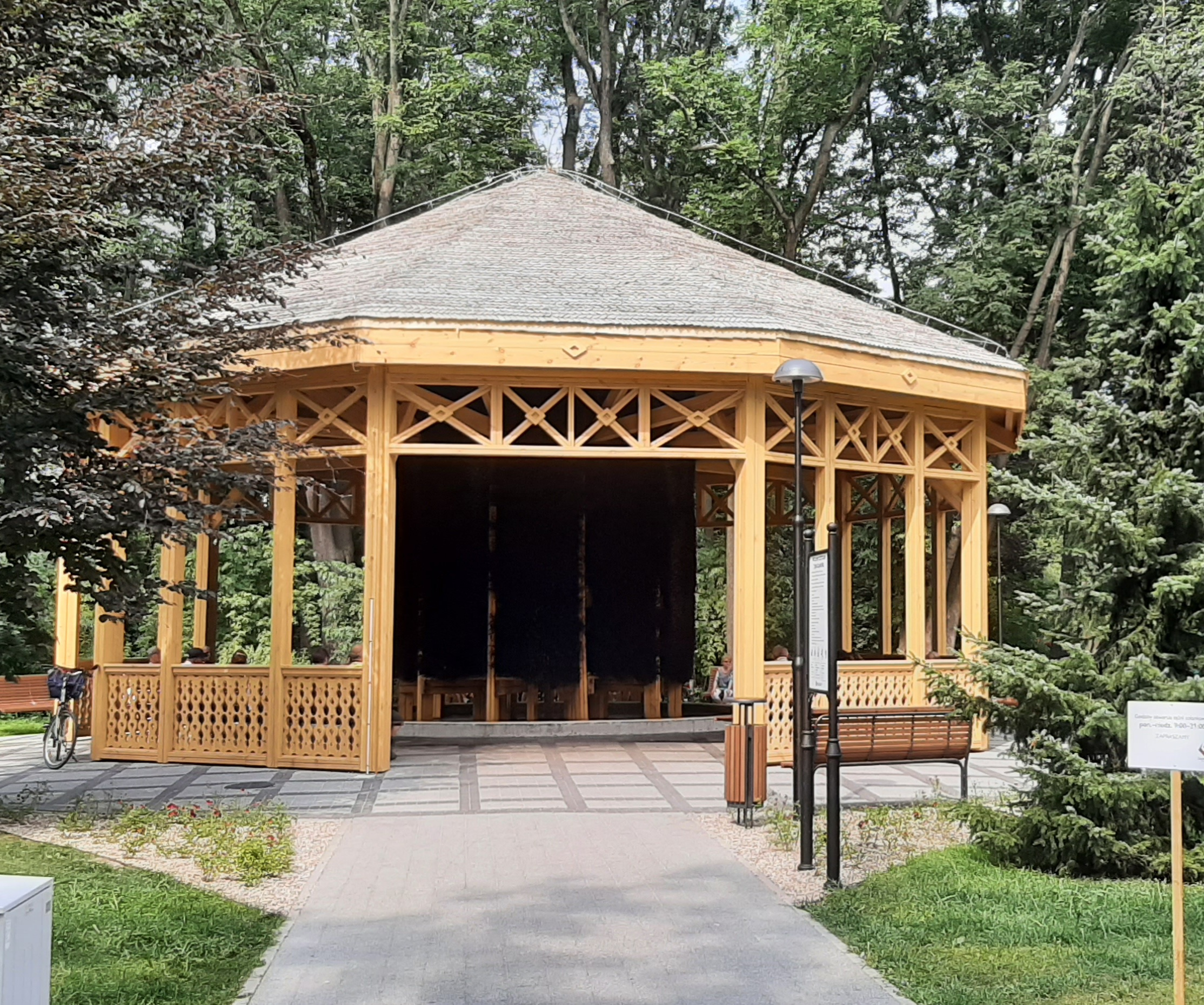
Graduation tower

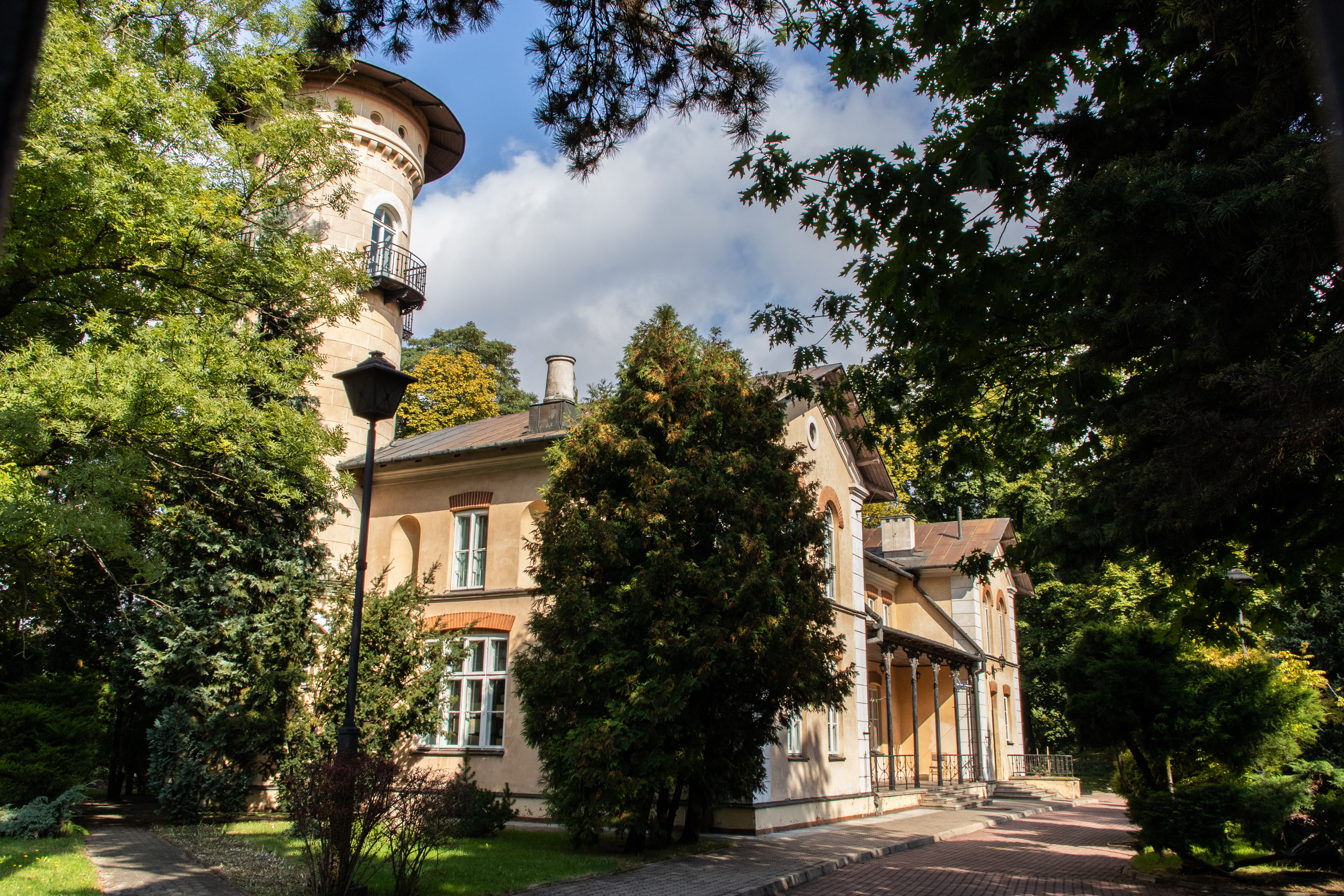
Foksal Villa located adjacent to the park
