= Krzysztof Etmanowicz =

Polish football manager (1959–2012)

Personal information
- Full name: Krzysztof Andrzej Etmanowicz
- Date of birth: 3 March 1959
- Place of birth: Warsaw, Poland
- Date of death: 19 December 2012 (aged 53)
- Place of death: Warsaw, Poland

Senior career*
Years	Team	Apps	(Gls)
- Legia Warsaw
- AZS-AWF Warsaw
- Polonia Warsaw
- Olimpia Poznań
- Šklo Union Teplice

Managerial career
- 1990–1991: Legia Warsaw II
- 1991–1992: Legia Warsaw
- 1995–1997: Marcovia Marki
- 1997–1999: Ursus Warsaw
- 2002–2003: GKP Targówek
- 2003–2004: Znicz Pruszków
- 2004–2005: Narew Ostrołęka
- 2006: Polonia Warsaw II
- 2006: Narew Ostrołęka
- 2006–2008: Pogoń Grodzisk Mazowiecki
- 2009–2010: Marcovia Marki
- 2011–2012: Huragan Wołomin
- 2012: GKP Targówek
- 2012: KS Łomianki
- * Club domestic league appearances and goals

Krzysztof Andrzej Etmanowicz (3 March 1959 – 19 December 2012) was a Polish football manager and player.
