= Damian Jaroń =

Polish footballer

Personal information
- Full name: Damian Jaroń
- Date of birth: 9 April 1990 (age 36)
- Place of birth: Warsaw, Poland
- Height: 1.84 m (6 ft 1/2 in)
- Position: Midfielder

Team information
- Current team: Pogoń Grodzisk Mazowiecki
- Number: 10

Youth career
- Pogoń Grodzisk Mazowiecki
- 2006–2008: Polonia Warsaw

Senior career*
Years	Team	Apps	(Gls)
2008–2011	Polonia Warsaw	9	(0)
2010	→ GKP Gorzów Wlkp. (loan)	8	(0)
2011	→ Wisła Płock (loan)	17	(3)
2011–2013	Wisła Płock	30	(0)
2012	→ Dolcan Ząbki (loan)	3	(0)
2013	→ Polonia Bytom (loan)	13	(0)
2013–2014	Motor Lublin	33	(4)
2014–	Pogoń Grodzisk Mazowiecki	340	(110)

International career
2010	Poland U21	1	(0)
- * Club domestic league appearances and goals as of 19:34, 26 May 2026 (UTC)

Damian Jaroń (born 9 April 1990) is a Polish professional footballer who plays as a midfielder for and captains I liga club Pogoń Grodzisk Mazowiecki.

== Club career ==
In July 2010, he was loaned to GKP Gorzów Wlkp. on a one-year deal. He was released half a year later.

In March 2011, he was loaned to Wisła Płock on a half-year deal. In June 2011, he was sold to Wisła and signed a two-and-a-half-year contract.

== International career ==
He was a part of Poland under-21 national football team.

== Honours ==
Pogoń Grodzisk Wielkopolski

- III liga, group I: 2020–21, 2023–24
- IV liga Masovia: 2016–17 (North), 2018–19 (South)
- Polish Cup (Masovia regionals): 2023–24
