= Tomasz Kafarski =

Polish footballer and manager

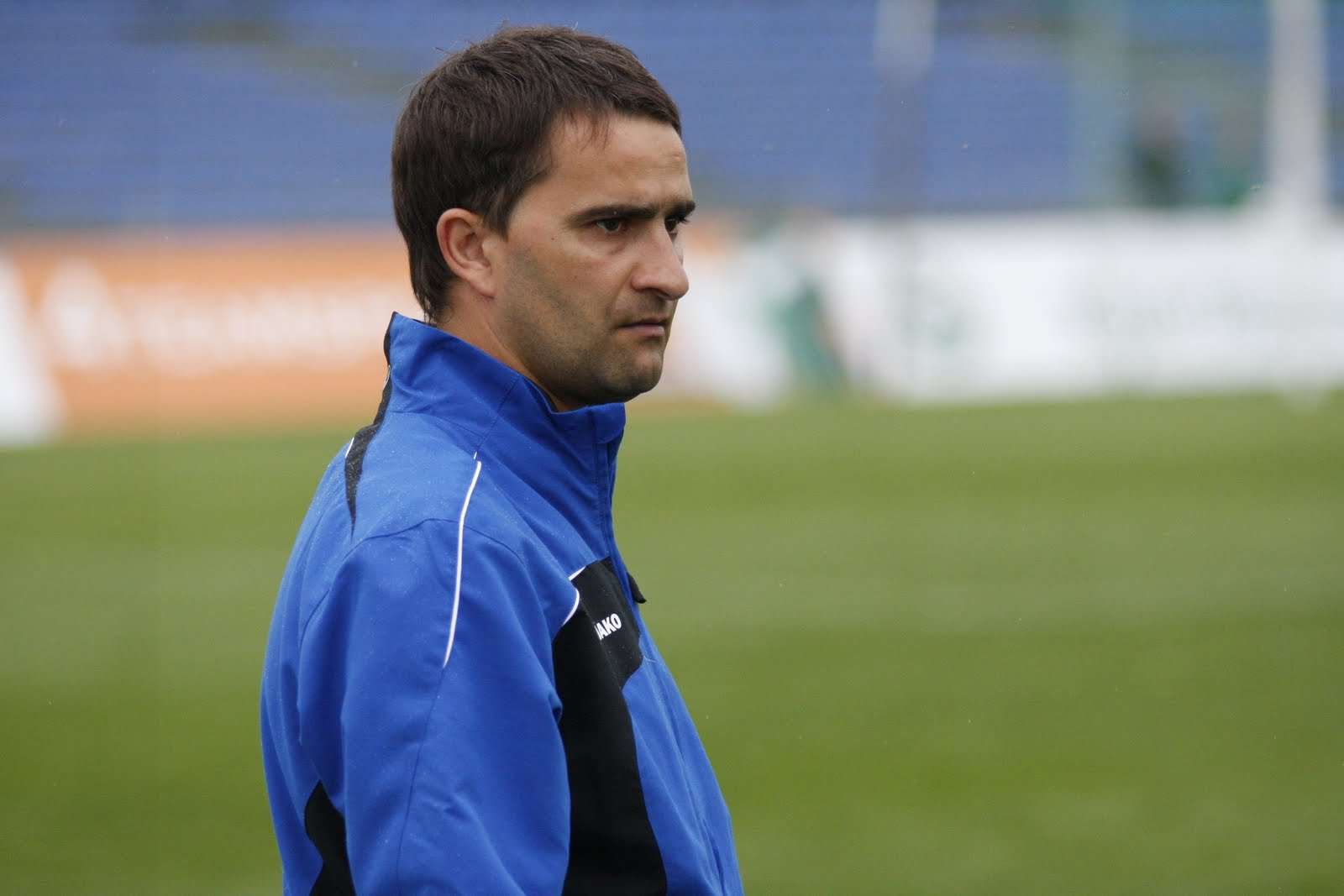
- Kafarski in 2013

Personal information
- Full name: Tomasz Kafarski
- Date of birth: 13 January 1975 (age 51)
- Place of birth: Kościerzyna, Poland
- Height: 1.80 m (5 ft 11 in)
- Position: Winger

Team information
- Current team: Pogoń Grodzisk Mazowiecki (manager)

Youth career
- 1981–1987: Kaszubia Kościerzyna
- 1987–1993: Lechia Gdańsk

Senior career*
Years	Team	Apps	(Gls)
1993–2003	Kaszubia Kościerzyna		

Managerial career
- 2001–2006: Kaszubia Kościerzyna
- 2006–2009: Lechia Gdańsk (assistant)
- 2009–2011: Lechia Gdańsk
- 2012: Cracovia
- 2013: Flota Świnoujście
- 2013–2014: Olimpia Grudziądz
- 2014–2015: Flota Świnoujście
- 2015–2017: Bytovia Bytów
- 2017: Górnik Łęczna
- 2018–2020: Sandecja Nowy Sącz
- 2021–2022: Chojniczanka Chojnice
- 2023: Sandecja Nowy Sącz
- 2024–2026: Świt Szczecin
- 2026–: Pogoń Grodzisk Mazowiecki
- * Club domestic league appearances and goals

Tomasz Kafarski (born 13 January 1975) is a Polish professional football manager and former player who played as a winger. He is currently in charge of I liga club Pogoń Grodzisk Mazowiecki.

== Managerial statistics ==
As of match played 20 November 2026

Managerial record by team and tenure
Team	From	To	Record							
Team	From	To	G	W	D	L	GF	GA	GD	Win %
Lechia Gdańsk	7 April 2009	8 November 2011	93	30	28	35	93	99	−6	32.26
Cracovia	6 March 2012	11 June 2012	10	1	3	6	10	19	−9	10.00
Flota Świnoujście	11 April 2013	25 June 2013	12	5	4	3	20	12	+8	41.67
Olimpia Grudziądz	25 June 2013	6 January 2014	20	9	2	9	24	32	−8	45.00
Flota Świnoujście	7 May 2014	12 January 2015	27	10	11	6	31	23	+8	37.04
Bytovia Bytów	30 March 2015	18 March 2017	75	28	24	23	97	90	+7	37.33
Górnik Łęczna	10 July 2017	13 November 2017	18	4	5	9	15	25	−10	22.22
Sandecja Nowy Sącz	11 June 2018	6 January 2020	67	25	20	22	80	83	−3	37.31
Chojniczanka Chojnice	29 May 2021	8 November 2022	57	28	10	19	100	70	+30	49.12
Sandecja Nowy Sącz	9 March 2023	9 August 2023	16	2	4	10	12	28	−16	12.50
Świt Szczecin	3 September 2024	31 March 2026	56	23	16	17	99	94	+5	41.07
Pogoń Grodzisk Mazowiecki	1 July 2026	Present	16	6	3	7	23	20	+3	37.50
Total			467	171	130	166	604	595	+9	36.62

== Honours ==
Kaszubia Kościerzyna

- IV liga Pomerania: 2002–03

Individual

- I liga Coach of the Month: July & August 2026
