= Marek Zub =

Polish footballer and manager

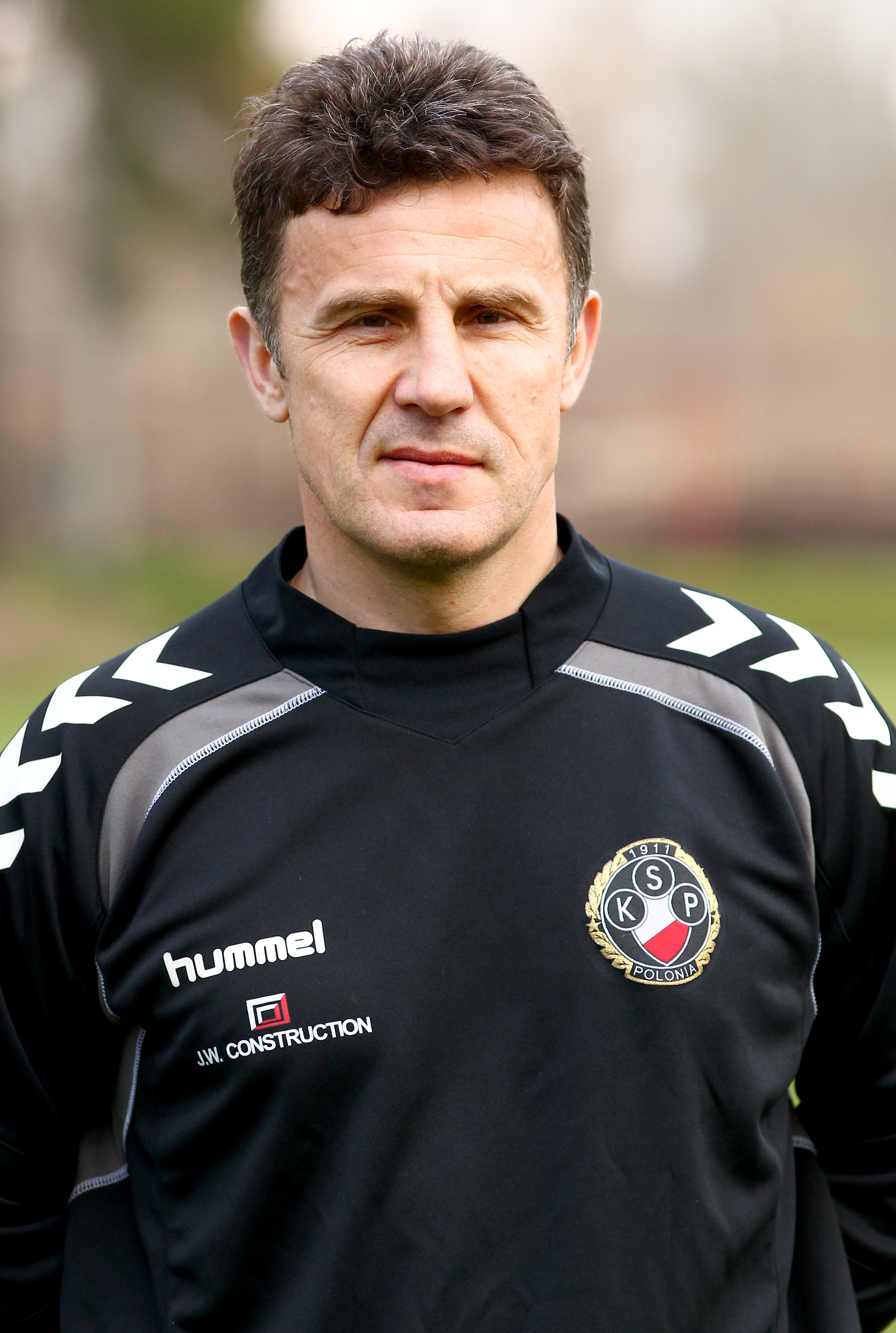
- Zub with Polonia Warsaw in 2011

Personal information
- Date of birth: 24 August 1964 (age 62)
- Place of birth: Tomaszów Lubelski, Poland
- Height: 1.84 m (6 ft 0 in)
- Position: Defender

Team information
- Current team: Stal Rzeszów (manager)

Senior career*
Years	Team	Apps	(Gls)
1980–1983	Hetman Zamość		
1983–1984	AZS-AWF Warszawa		
1984–1991	Igloopol Dębica		
1991–1992	FC le Lorrain Arlon		
1993–1995	KS Piaseczno		
1995–1996	Polonia Warsaw		
1996–2000	KS Piaseczno		

Managerial career
- 1989–1991: Igloopol Dębica (U18)
- 1992–1993: Hetman Zamość (assistant)
- 1993–1995: KS Piaseczno (assistant)
- 1995–1996: Polonia Warsaw (assistant)
- 1996–2000: KS Piaseczno (player-manager)
- 2000: Okęcie Warsaw
- 2000: Mazowsze Grójec
- 2001–2002: KS Łomianki
- 2002–2003: Pogoń Grodzisk Mazowiecki
- 2003–2004: Polonia Warsaw (assistant)
- 2005: Mazowsze Grójec
- 2005: Świt Nowy Dwór Mazowiecki
- 2006–2007: GKS Bełchatów (assistant)
- 2007–2008: Widzew Łódź
- 2008–2010: Widzew Łódź (sporting director)
- 2011–2012: Polonia Warsaw (assistant)
- 2012: Poland (assistant)
- 2012–2014: Žalgiris
- 2015: GKS Bełchatów
- 2016: Shenyang Urban
- 2017: Spartaks Jūrmala
- 2017–2018: Shakhtyor Soligorsk
- 2018: FC Tobol
- 2019: Žalgiris
- 2020: Tukums
- 2021: Spartaks Jūrmala
- 2023–: Stal Rzeszów
- * Club domestic league appearances and goals

Marek Zub (born 24 August 1964) is a Polish professional football manager and former player, currently in charge of Polish club Stal Rzeszów.

== Managerial statistics ==
As of match played 8 November 2026

Managerial record by team and tenure
Team	From	To	Record							
Team	From	To	G	W	D	L	GF	GA	GD	Win %
Mazowsze Grójec	21 April 2005	30 July 2005	11	4	2	5	19	21	−2	36.36
Świt Nowy Dwór Mazowiecki	1 July 2005	31 December 2005	18	5	5	8	19	23	−4	27.78
Widzew Łódź	6 September 2007	21 April 2008	32	6	10	16	35	50	−15	18.75
Žalgiris	8 August 2012	31 December 2014	90	61	19	10	211	64	+147	67.78
GKS Bełchatów	25 March 2015	20 May 2015	8	0	2	6	7	20	−13	0.00
Shenyang Urban	21 January 2016	27 December 2016	22	11	3	8	32	20	+12	50.00
Spartaks Jūrmala	19 February 2017	18 July 2017	17	8	5	4	23	15	+8	47.06
Shakhtyor Soligorsk	19 July 2017	18 April 2018	21	11	3	7	41	21	+20	52.38
Tobol	6 August 2018	31 December 2018	12	5	3	4	13	11	+2	41.67
Žalgiris	13 February 2019	15 July 2019	21	15	1	5	44	20	+24	71.43
Tukums	23 January 2020	4 June 2020	0	0	0	0	0	0	+0	—
Spartaks Jūrmala	26 January 2021	14 June 2021	12	3	0	9	11	21	−10	25.00
Stal Rzeszów	1 July 2023	Present	123	44	24	55	172	213	−41	35.77
Total			387	173	77	137	627	499	+128	44.70

== Honours ==
=== Manager ===
Žalgiris

- A Lyga: 2013, 2014
- Lithuanian Football Cup: 2012–13, 2013–14
- Lithuanian Supercup: 2013

Individual

- Coach of the Year in Lithuania: 2014
- I liga Coach of the Month: April 2024, November & December 2025, September 2026
