= Grodzisk Mazowiecki =

Town in Masovian Voivodeship, Poland

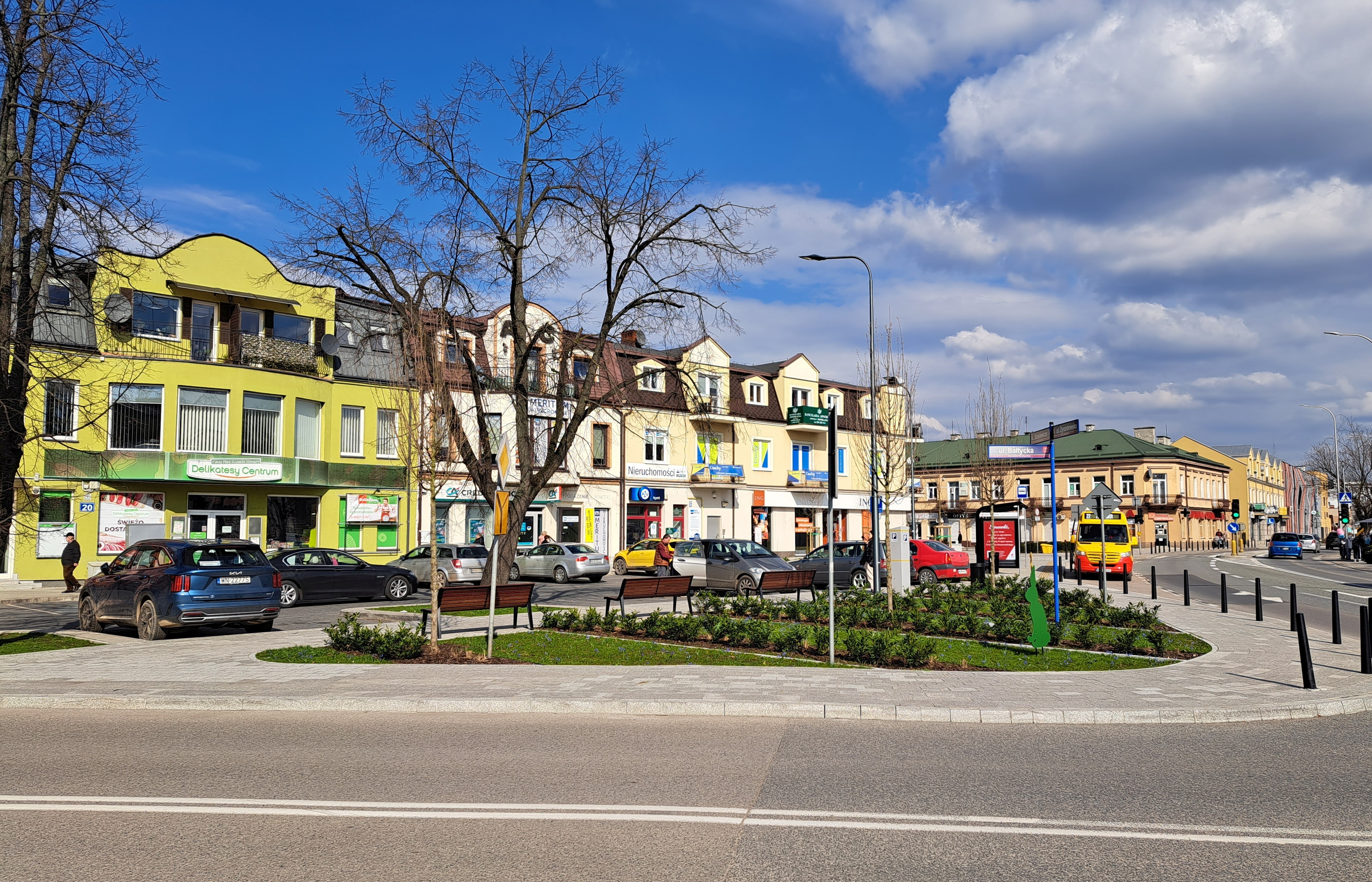
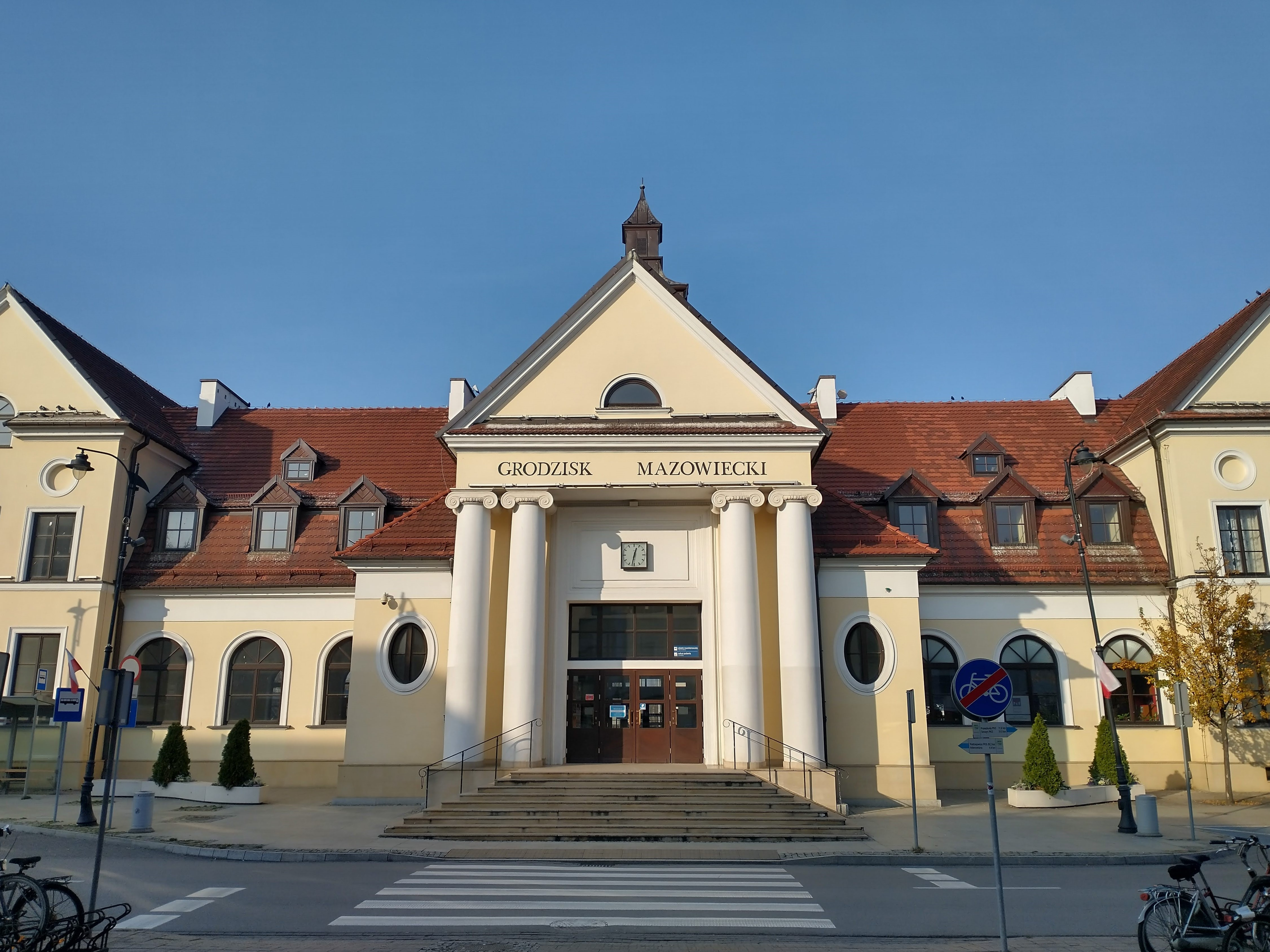
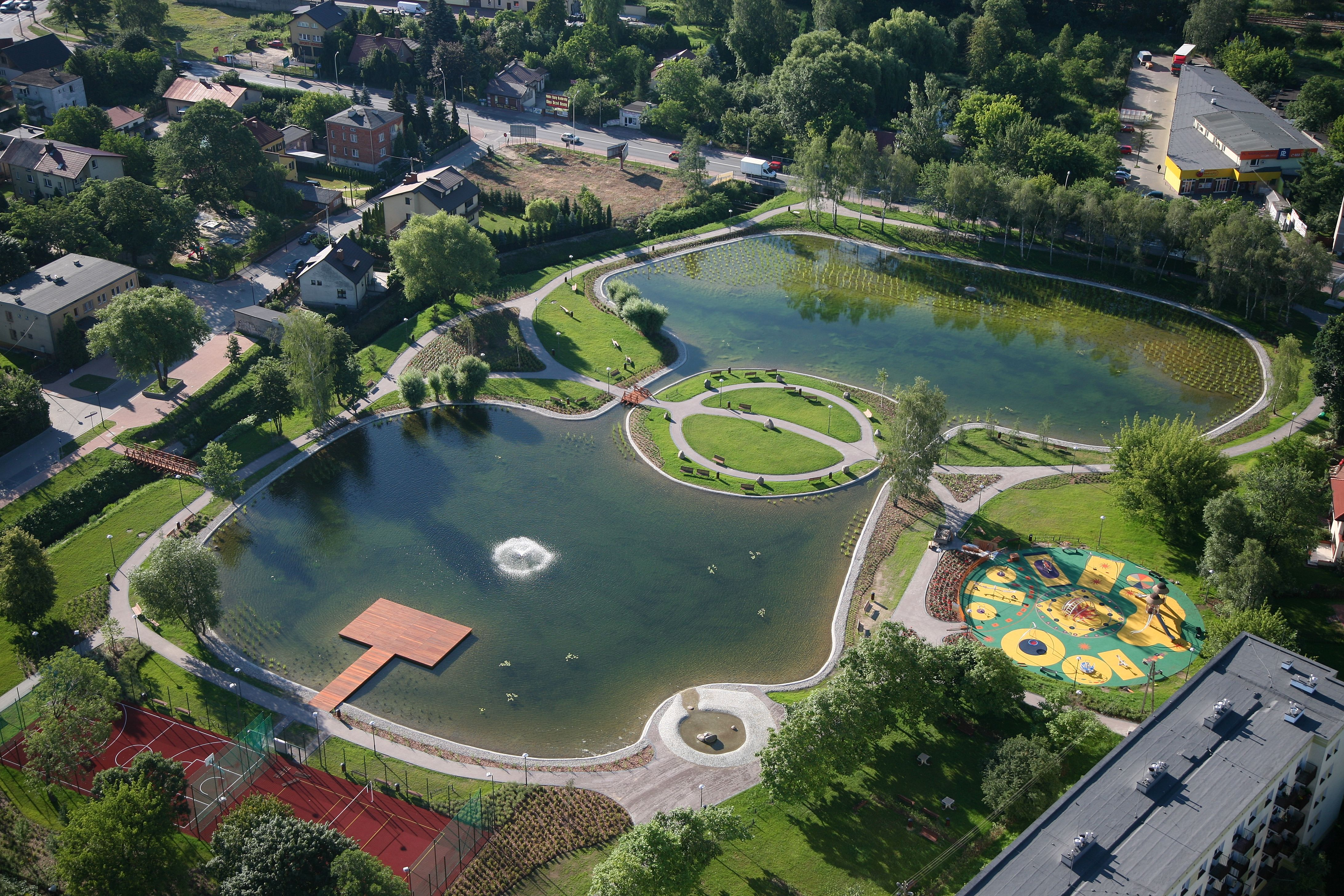
- King Sigismund the Old Square Main railway station Golian ponds

- Coat of arms

- Location within Poland
- Coordinates: 52°6′32″N 20°37′30″E
- Country: Poland
- Voivodeship: Masovian
- County: Grodzisk
- Gmina: Grodzisk Mazowiecki
- Founded: 12th century
- Town rights: 1522

Government
  - Mayor: Tomasz Krupski

Area
  - Total: 13.19 km^{2} (5.09 sq mi)

Population (2024)
  - Total: 34,718
  - Density: 2,632/km^{2} (6,817/sq mi)
- Time zone: UTC+1 (CET)
  - Summer (DST): UTC+2 (CEST)
- Postal code: 05-825 to 05-827
- Area code: +48 022
- Car plates: WGM
- Website: http://www.grodzisk.pl

Grodzisk Mazowiecki (Polish pronunciation: [ˈɡrɔd͡ʑisk mazɔˈvjɛt͡skʲi]) is a town in central Poland, the capital of Grodzisk County in the Masovian Voivodeship, with 34,718 inhabitants (2024).

Grodzisk Mazowiecki is a town that developed from an early medieval fortified stronghold into a local trade center in the early modern period, and then was industrialized in the 19th century. It is located on the western edge of the Warsaw metropolitan area, 40 kilometres (25 mi) southwest of Warsaw, and borders the town of Milanówek in the east.

== History ==
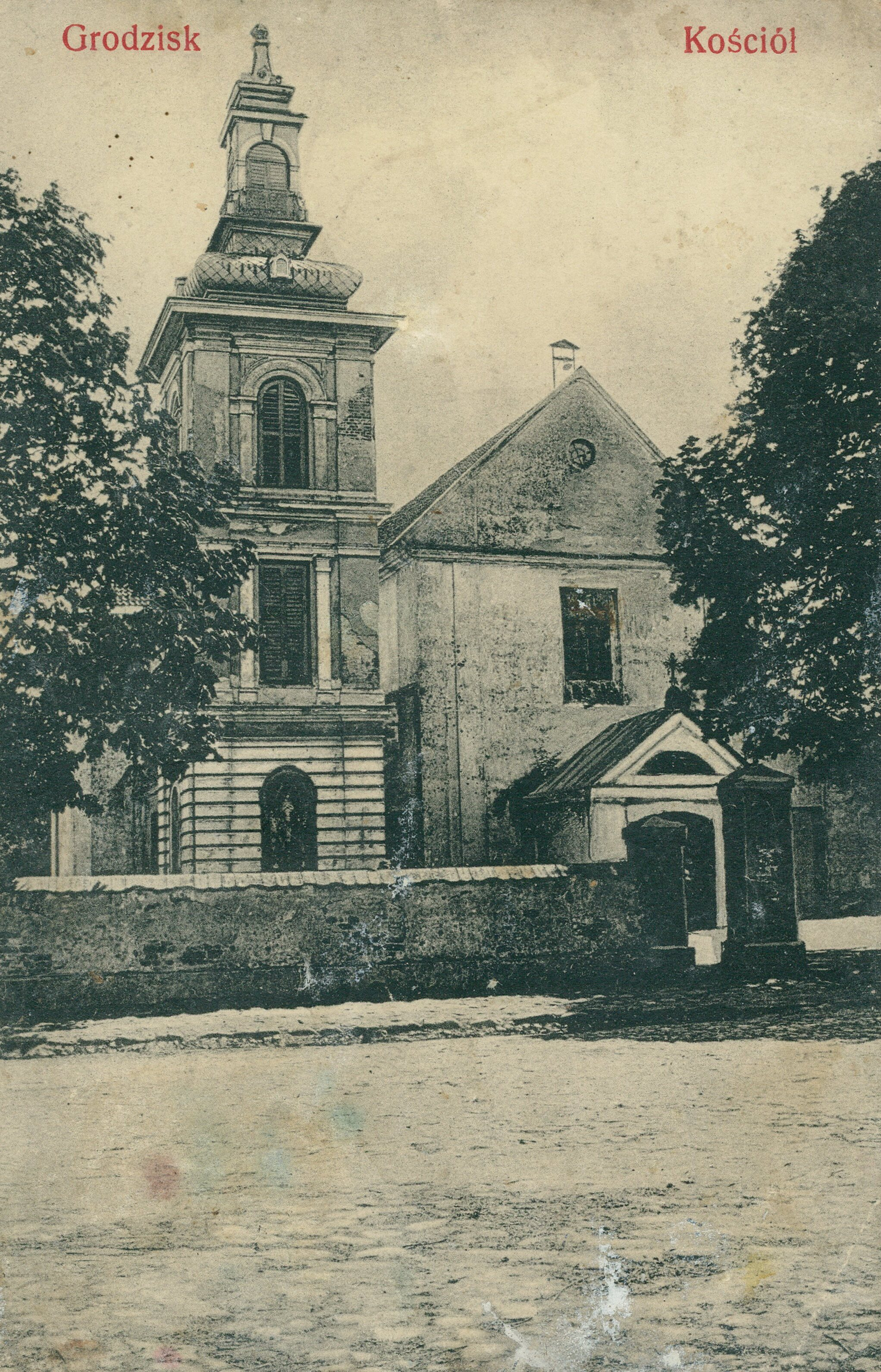
Saint Anne church in the 1910s

The origins of Grodzisk Mazowiecki can be traced back to the 12th century when medieval village Grodzisk was founded. This settlement was built on the outskirts of the Jaktorowska Forest and its remains are a part of the existing town area. In 1355 the first known owner of the settlement Tomasz Grodziński founded a church which was later destroyed by fire (1441). In 15th century Grodzisk remained the parish seat.

Dating from the end of the 15th century to 1623 Grodzisk was owned by the Okunia and Mokrowski families. In 1522 Grodzisk has received municipal rights from king Sigismund I the Old. It was administratively located in the Mszczonów County in the Rawa Voivodeship in the Greater Poland Province of the Kingdom of Poland. In 1540 Grodzisk was destroyed by the fire and was not reconstructed until the end of 16th century. After the reconstruction, Grodzisk became a local trade and production centre due to its location and the local traffic routes. In 1655 it was again destroyed during Swedish Deluge and then restored. In 1708 the town was struck by a cholera epidemic and as a result, its population diminished down to 370 people.

Grodzisk was annexed by Prussia in the Third Partition of Poland in 1795. In 1807 it was regained by Poles and included within the short-lived Duchy of Warsaw, and after its dissolution in 1815, it fell to the Russian Partition of Poland. During the November Uprising (1830–1831) the town was the place of fights between the insurrectionists’ forces and Russian army. The recovery of the local economy was possible to the prosperous railway route connecting Warsaw and Skierniewice built in 1846. In 1870 the town's municipal rights were taken away by the Tsarist authorities as punishment for the unsuccessful Polish January Uprising. Between the 19th and 20th century Grodzisk was known as recreation center with hydropathic establishment founded by Michał Bojasiński. In 1915 Grodzisk regained its municipal rights.

In interwar Poland, Grodzisk was the seat of Błonie County in the Warsaw Voivodeship. In 1928, the town was renamed to Grodzisk Mazowiecki by the addition of the adjective "Mazowiecki" after the region of Masovia, within which it is located, to distinguish it from the town of Grodzisk Wielkopolski in western Poland.

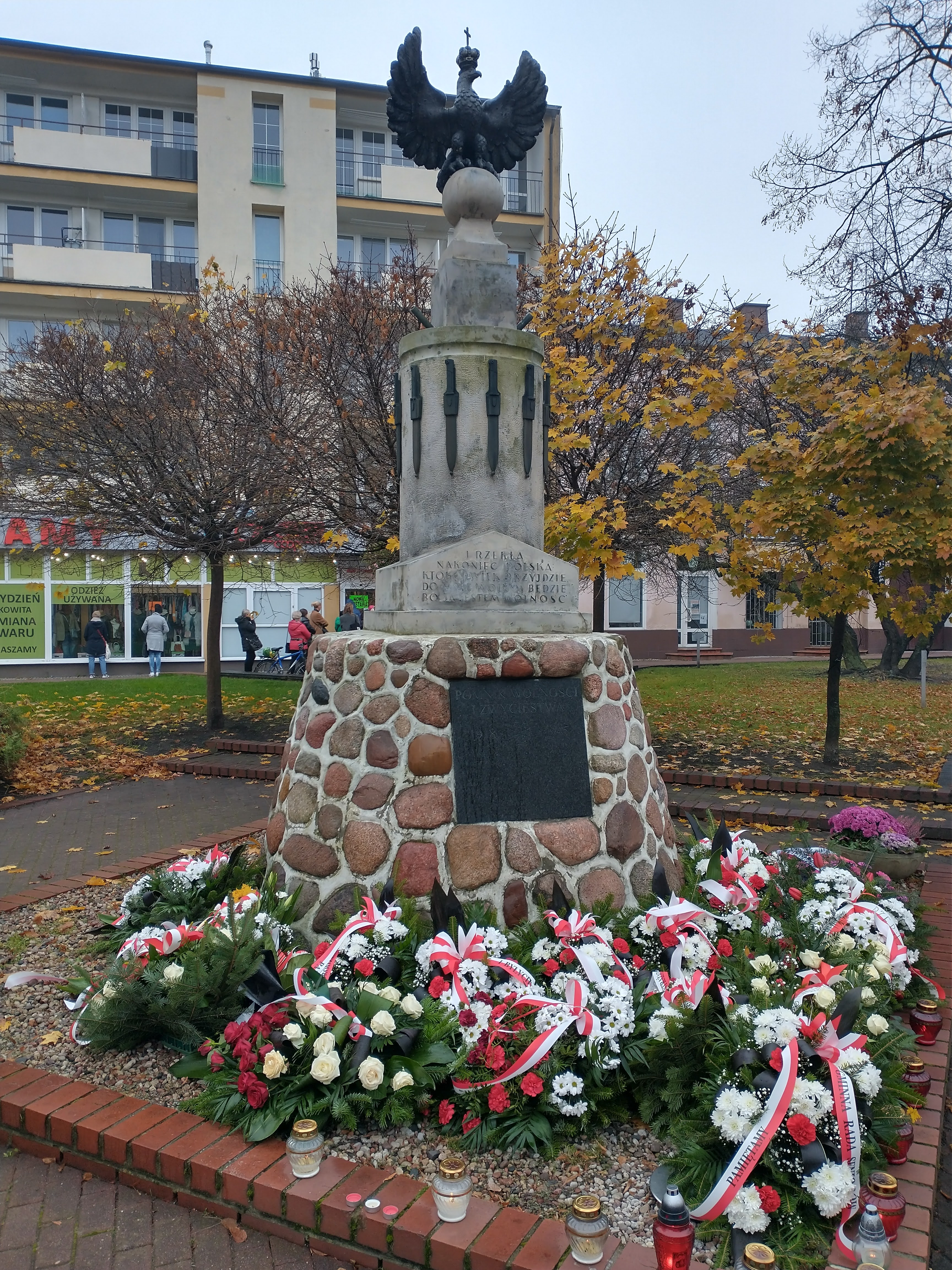
Freedom Monument

Following the joint German-Soviet invasion of Poland, which started World War II in September 1939, Grodzisk Mazowiecki was occupied by Germany until 1945. Administratively it was located in the Warsaw District of the General Government. The Polish resistance was active in the town, and even the underground University of the Western Lands gave secret lectures. There were secret Polish printing presses in operation, including one in the prison until it was discovered by the Germans in August 1943, and the Polish prison doctor was arrested and then murdered at Pawiak. In 1943, local Poles took in a number of kidnapped Polish children from the Zamość region, which were either bought out or secretly taken off German trains. In 1944, the National Military Union was founded in Grodzisk Mazowiecki. Some of the Poles who were expelled from Warsaw after the Warsaw Uprising relocated to Grodzisk Mazowiecki in 1944. Local Polish farmer Stanisława Sławińska hid Jews from the Nazis in her house in Grodzisk Mazowiecki. In 2008, she was honoured as Righteous Among the Nations by Yad Vashem. Among those she saved was the mother of the Israeli businessperson Yossi Maiman.

After the war, it was administratively located in the "large" Warsaw Voivodeship until 1975, and then the "small" Warsaw Voivodeship until 1998. Currently, Grodzisk Mazowiecki is a local industrial center for the area of Warsaw.

== Legends ==
According to a legend regarding the town charter, monarchs were riding through the settlement of Grodzisk on their way to hunt in Jaktorowska forest. One of the monarchs, who was tired, was offered a cup of water from the town's spring to regain his strength. It was the extraordinary taste of the water that convinced the king to grant the town a charter.

== Jewish community ==
The town had a Jewish community and it had been the center of the Hasidic Grodzhisk dynasty, (Grodzisk Mazowiecki being pronounced as "Grodzhisk" in Yiddish.) Grodzisk was the birthplace of Kalonymus Kalman Shapira (1889–1943), also known as the Rebbe of the Warsaw Ghetto. During the wartime, all the Jewish population was deported and murdered.

In 2016, the remains of the Jewish cemetery in town were saved from being developed into a residential complex, and the city council pledged to preserve the cemetery, restore the original gate with Hebrew inscription, and build a fence around the property. Plans to build the residential complex were originally halted in 2014 when residents of the nearby Jewish community of Warsaw, as well as activist Robert Augustyniak, protested the plan.

== Sights ==
Sights of Grodzisk (examples)

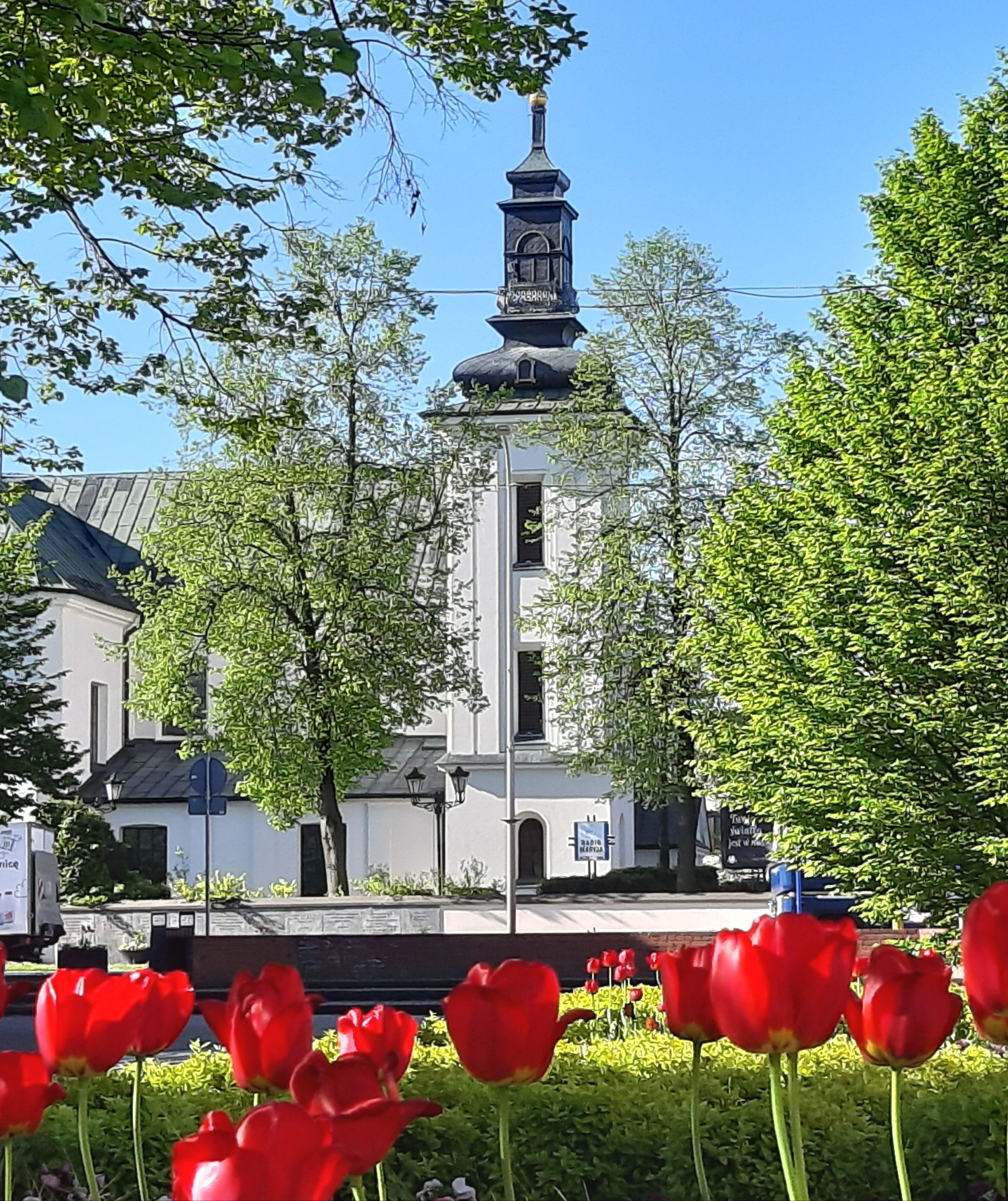
Baroque Saint Anne church

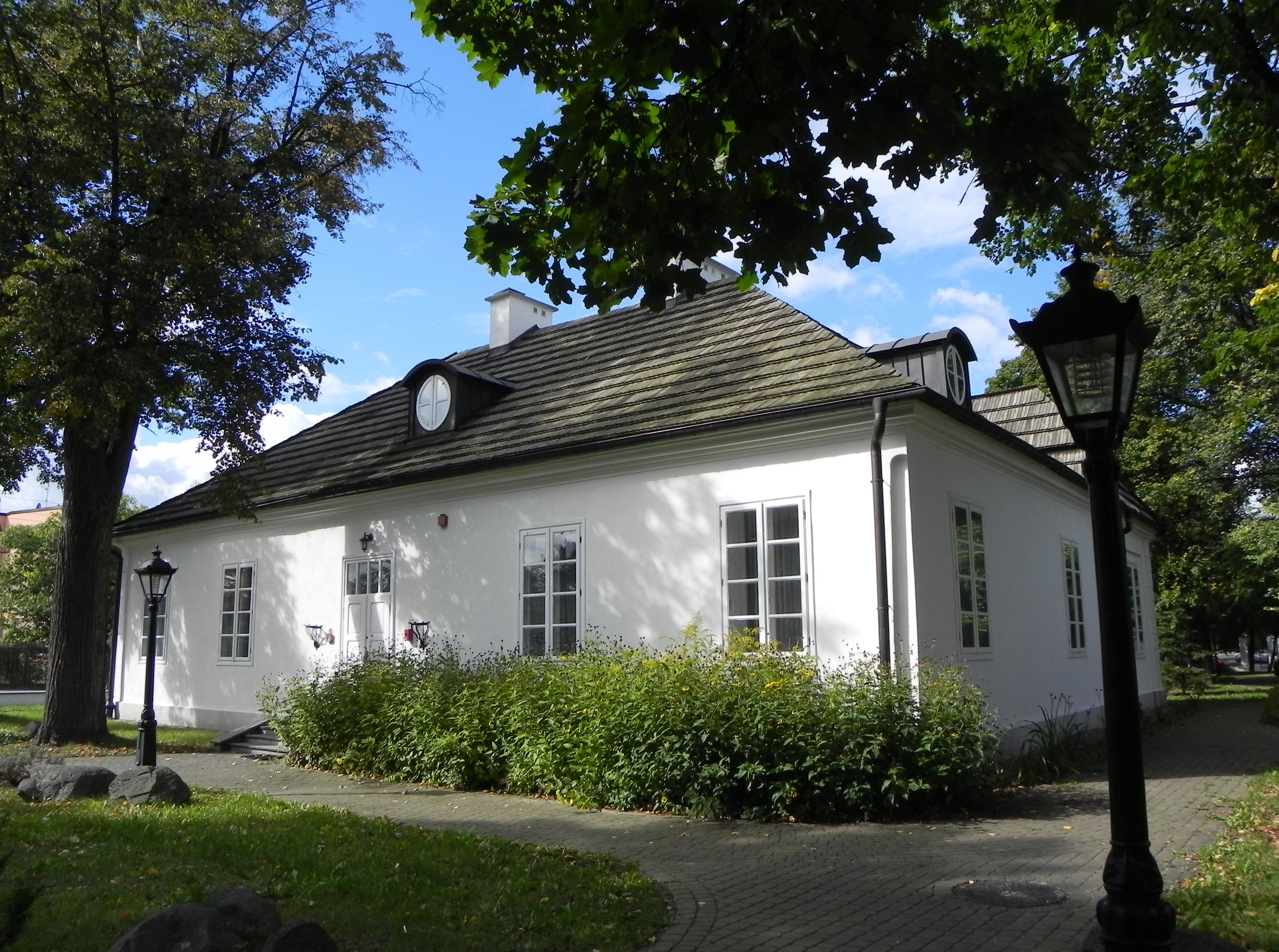
Baroque Skarbek manor house

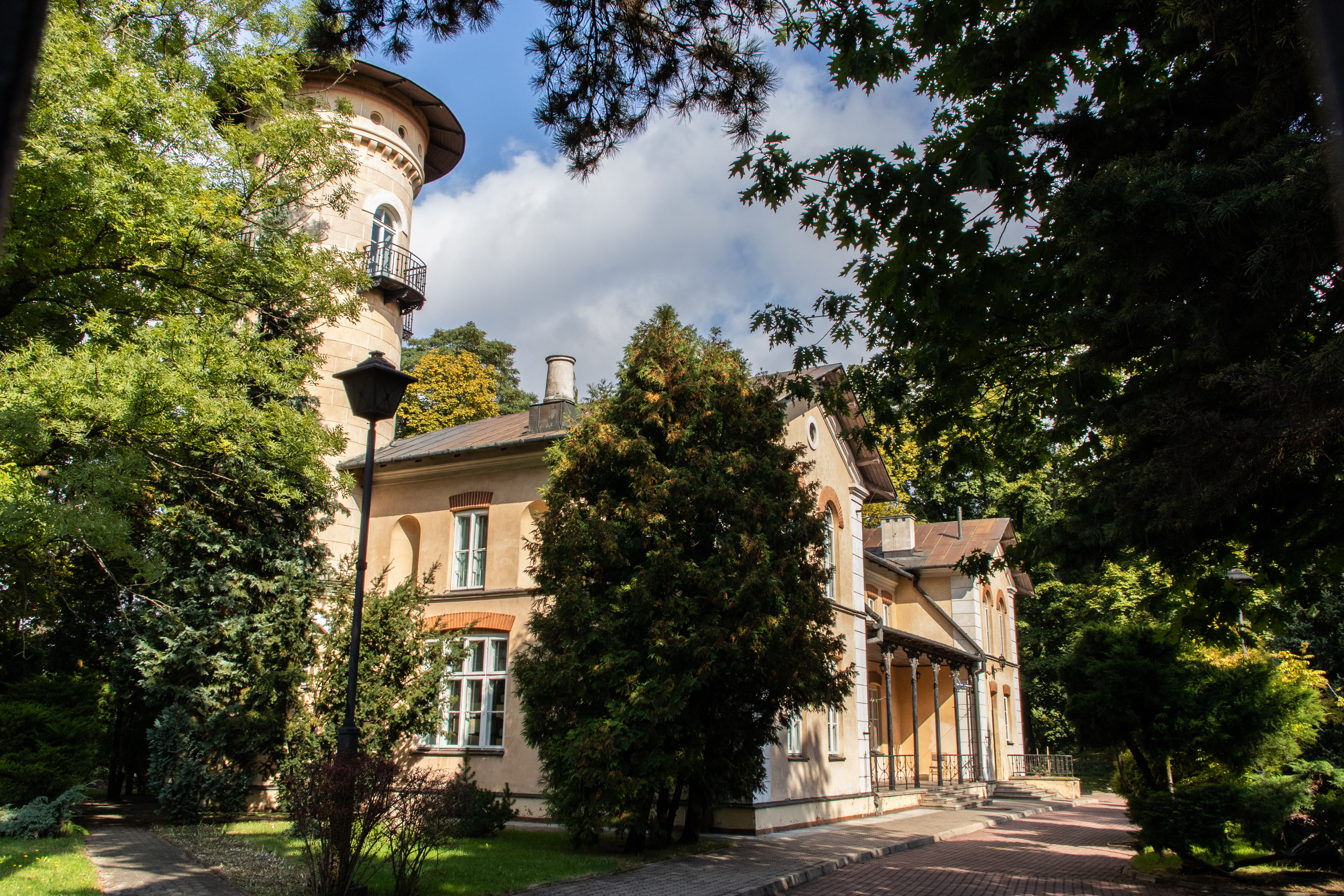
Foksal Villa

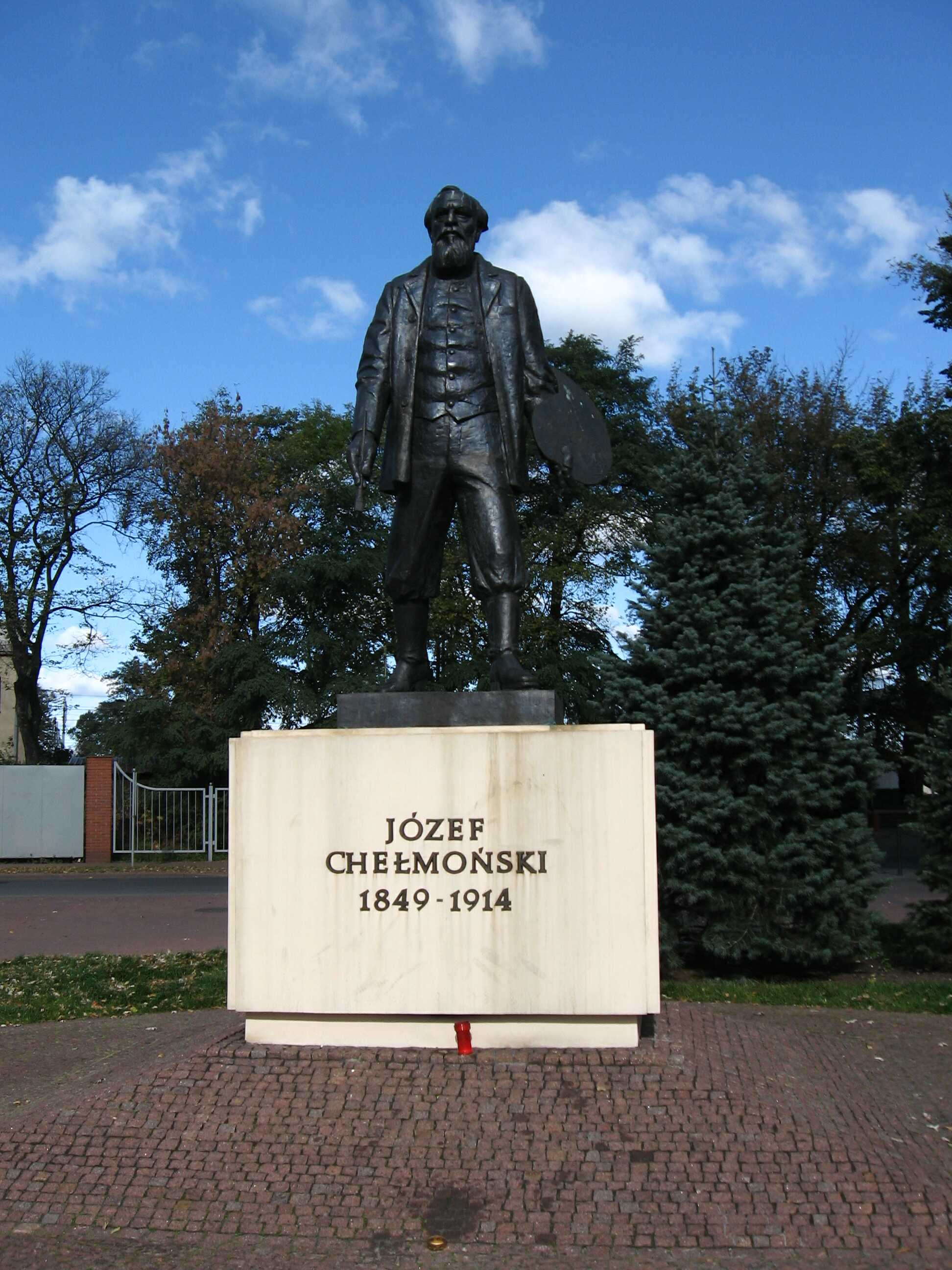
Józef Chełmoński Monument

- Foksal Villa, built in 1845 in a shape of a small locomotive. It was built right after launching the first part of the Warsaw–Vienna railway. The building is situated next to the old railway station.
- Baroque St. Anne's Parish Church was established in 1687. In the church, there are numerous examples of sacred paintings from the 18th century.
- Baroque Holy Cross Chapel, built in 1713 as a gesture of gratitude for the end of cholera epidemic. In 1995 the Chapel was moved next to the St. Anne's Church.
- Baroque Skarbek manor house, constructed in the 18th century. Dating from 1869 it was the residence of the Skarbek family. Today, the building serves as a National Music School of the first degree.
- Old Jewish cemetery, established in the 18th century
- Historic villas, including the Milusin Villa, Niespodzianka Villa, Radogoszcz Villa, Kaprys Villa, Kniaziew Villa, Janówek Villa
- Józef Chełmoński Monument

=== Recreational areas ===
- Count Skarbków Park
- Golian Ponds
- Skarbek Park
- Walczewski Ponds

== Sports ==
The local football club is Pogoń Grodzisk Mazowiecki. It competes in the I liga, as of 2025–26.

== Sister city ==
- Radviliškis, Lithuania

== Notable residents ==
- Mordechai Bentov (born Mordechai Gutgeld, 1900–1985), Israeli journalist, Minister, and one of the signatories of the Israeli declaration of independence.
