= Piotr Stokowiec =

Polish footballer and manager (born 1972)

- Stokowiec in 2025

Personal information
- Full name: Piotr Stokowiec
- Date of birth: 25 May 1972 (age 54)
- Place of birth: Kielce, Poland
- Height: 1.84 m (6 ft 0 in)
- Position: Midfielder

Team information
- Current team: Polonia Warsaw (manager)

Youth career
- Atest Kielce

Senior career*
Years	Team	Apps	(Gls)
1991–1992	Orlęta Kielce		
1992	Korona Kielce	1	(0)
1993–1994	AZS AWF Warsaw		
1994–1995	FC Piaseczno	28	(2)
1995–1996	Polonia Warsaw	20	(0)
1996	Świt Nowy Dwór Mazowiecki	15	(1)
1997–2000	KSZO Ostrowiec Św.	112	(5)
2000	Śląsk Wrocław	14	(3)
2001–2002	Dyskobolia Grodzisk Wlkp.	24	(1)
2002	Akademisk Boldklub	11	(1)
2002	KSZO Ostrowiec Św.	12	(2)
2003–2006	Polonia Warsaw	53	(2)
2006	Notodden FK		
2007	Wigry Suwałki	2	(1)

Managerial career
- 2006–2007: Wigry Suwałki (player-manager)
- 2011: Polonia Warsaw (caretaker)
- 2011–2012: Polonia Warsaw (MESA)
- 2012–2013: Polonia Warsaw
- 2013–2014: Jagiellonia Białystok
- 2014–2017: Zagłębie Lubin
- 2018–2021: Lechia Gdańsk
- 2021–2022: Zagłębie Lubin
- 2023–2024: ŁKS Łódź
- 2025–2026: Pogoń Grodzisk Mazowiecki
- 2026–: Polonia Warsaw
- * Club domestic league appearances and goals

Piotr Stokowiec (born 25 May 1972) is a Polish professional football manager and former player who is currently in charge of I liga club Polonia Warsaw.

== Player career ==
Stokowiec played as a midfielder for several clubs from Poland, Denmark and Norway between 1991 to 2007.

== Managerial career ==
=== Early years ===
Stokowiec became a player-manager of Wigry Suwałki in 2006. He then became an assistant manager of Widzew Łódź in 2007.

=== Polonia Warsaw ===
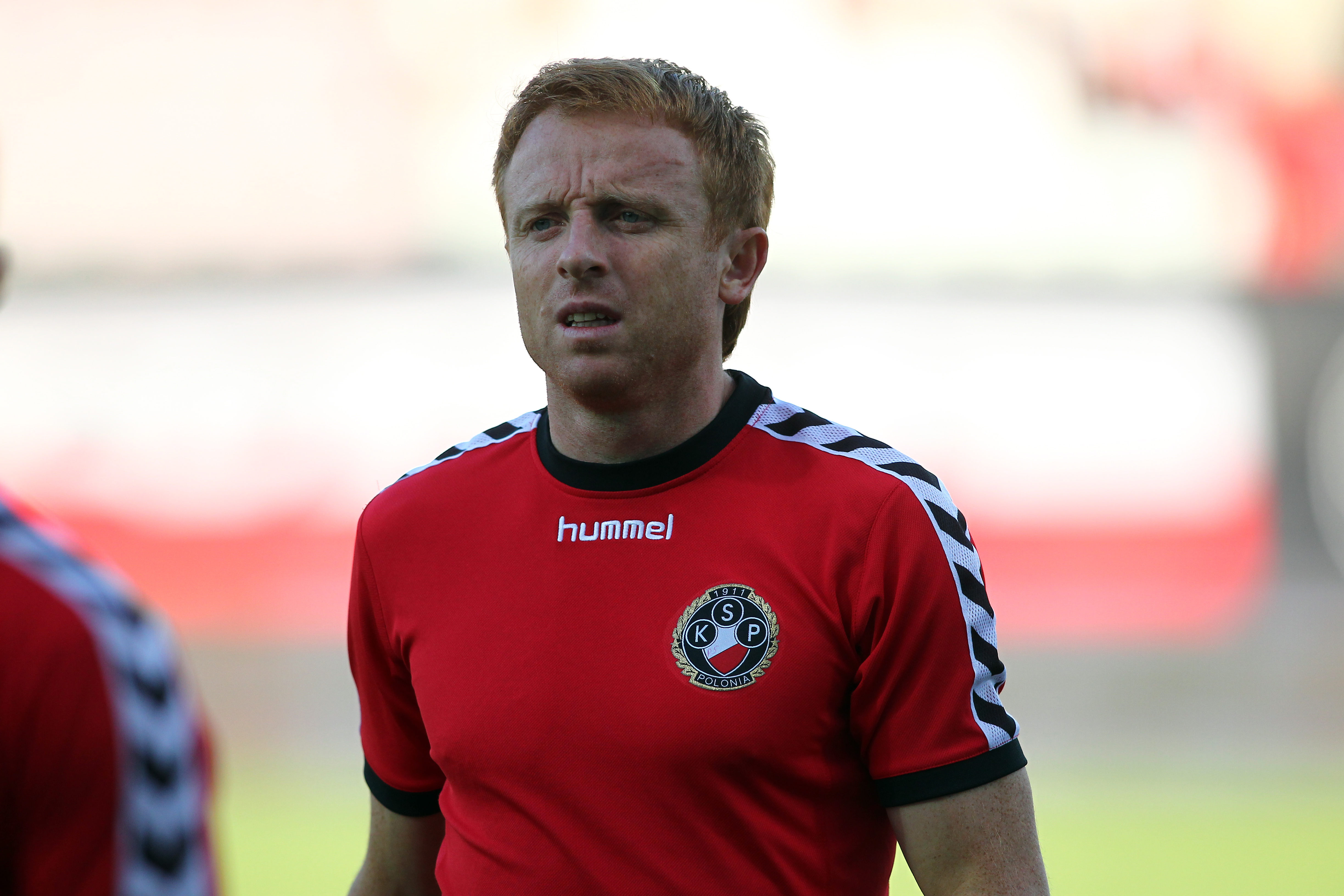
Stokowiec as manager of Polonia Warsaw in 2010

Stokowiec was an assistant manager of José Mari Bakero, Paweł Janas and Theo Bos at Polonia Warsaw in 2010 and 2011.

On 21 July 2012, Stokowiec became the head coach of Polonia. After finishing 6th during the 2012–13 Ekstraklasa season, Polonia did not received the license for the 2013–14 season due to financial problems.

=== Jagiellonia Białystok ===
On 17 June 2013, Stokowiec managed Jagiellonia Białystok. Jagiellonia reached the semi-finals of the 2013–14 Polish Cup season.

=== Zagłębie Lubin ===
On 12 May 2014, Zagłębie Lubin hired Stokowiec. Zagłębie won the 2014–15 I liga and promoted back to the Ekstraklasa. Zagłębie ended 3rd during the 2015–16 Ekstraklasa campaign, which secured a Europa League qualifying spot for the next season. Zagłębie eliminated Slavia Sofia and Partizan Belgrade before being eliminated by Sønderjyske in the third qualifying round.

=== Lechia Gdańsk ===
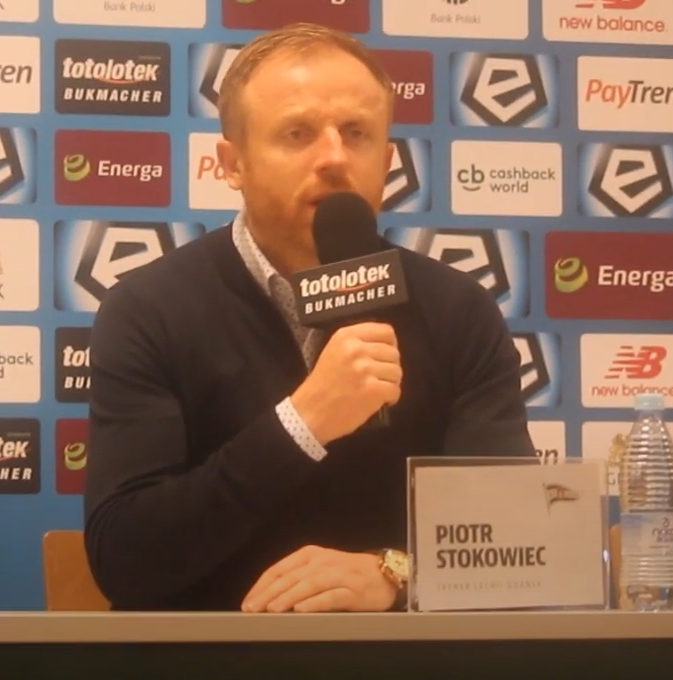
Stokowiec in 2018 as manager of Lechia Gdańsk

On 5 March 2018, he became the manager of Lechia Gdańsk. Lechia finished 3rd during the 2018–19 Ekstraklasa season. Under the lead of Stokowiec, Lechia won the 2018–19 Polish Cup and the 2019 Polish Super Cup.

On 28 August 2021, Lechia and Stokowiec parted ways.

=== Return to Zagłębie Lubin ===
On 21 December 2021, he returned to Zagłębie Lubin, signing a two-and-a-half-year contract with his former club. On 8 November 2022, following five straight league defeats and getting eliminated from the Polish Cup in the round of 32, he was sacked.

=== ŁKS Łódź ===
On 12 October 2023, Stokowiec was announced as the new manager of ŁKS Łódź. At the time of his appointment, they were placed last in the Ekstraklasa table after 11 rounds of the 2023–24 season. ŁKS's form did not improve under Stokowiec, as they failed to record a single win across all competitions before his dismissal on 20 February 2024, following a 0–2 Łódź Derby loss against Widzew Łódź two days prior.

=== Pogoń Grodzisk Mazowiecki ===
On 17 June 2025, Stokowiec was appointed as manager of I liga newcomers Pogoń Grodzisk Mazowiecki. Pogoń's form at the start of the season saw them sitting in fourth place after 13 games played - for his efforts, Stokowiec was named the I liga Coach of the Month in September 2025. They finished the 2025–26 season in 11th place. On 24 May 2026, hours after the final game of the season against Śląsk Wrocław, it was announced Stokowiec decided not to extend his contract, and would leave the club at the end of June.

=== Return to Polonia Warsaw ===
On 4 June 2026, Polonia Warsaw announced Stokowiec would return to the club as manager on a three-year contract.

== Private life ==
He is married to Magdalena and has three daughters – Zofia, Jagoda, and Antonina. He has a brother, Marcin, also a coach.

== Managerial statistics ==
As of match played 20 November 2026

Managerial record by team and tenure
Team	From	To	Record							
Team	From	To	G	W	D	L	GF	GA	GD	Win %
Wigry Suwałki (player-manager)	15 December 2006	30 June 2007	18	8	5	5	33	21	+12	44.44
Polonia Warsaw (caretaker)	14 March 2011	23 March 2011	1	0	0	1	0	1	−1	0.00
Polonia Warsaw	21 July 2012	17 June 2013	32	12	9	11	49	37	+12	37.50
Jagiellonia Białystok	17 June 2013	7 April 2014	33	13	9	11	52	44	+8	39.39
Zagłębie Lubin	12 May 2014	27 November 2017	146	67	37	42	210	147	+63	45.89
Lechia Gdańsk	5 March 2018	29 August 2021	139	64	35	40	198	169	+29	46.04
Zagłębie Lubin	21 December 2021	8 November 2022	33	10	8	15	39	49	−10	30.30
ŁKS Łódź	12 October 2023	20 February 2024	10	0	3	7	8	23	−15	0.00
Pogoń Grodzisk Mazowiecki	1 July 2025	30 June 2026	36	12	12	12	54	55	−1	33.33
Polonia Warsaw	1 July 2026	Present	17	9	5	3	27	17	+10	52.94
Total			465	195	123	147	670	563	+107	41.94

== Honours ==
=== Manager ===
Zagłębie Lubin

- I liga: 2014–15

Lechia Gdańsk

- Polish Cup: 2018–19
- Polish Super Cup: 2019

Individual

- Polish Coach of the Year: 2018
- Ekstraklasa Coach of the Month: August 2017, August 2018
- I liga Coach of the Month: September 2025
