= Cezary Moleda =

Polish football manager

Personal information
- Date of birth: 30 June 1960 (age 66)
- Place of birth: Ciechanów, Poland

Senior career*
Years	Team	Apps	(Gls)
- Mazovia Ciechanów
- AZS Biała Podlaska

Managerial career
- 2001–2002: Mazur Karczew
- 2003–2004: MKS Ciechanów
- 2005: Polonia Warsaw (assistant)
- 2005–2006: Polonia Warsaw
- 2006–2007: Start Otwock
- 2008–2009: Narew Ostrołęka
- 2009–2011: Żbik Nasielsk
- 2013: GKP Targówek
- 2015–2016: Nadnarwianka Pułtusk
- * Club domestic league appearances and goals

Cezary Moleda (born 30 June 1960) is a Polish professional football manager and former player. He was named the manager of Polonia Warsaw on 31 October 2005.
