= Molenda =

Molenda is a Polish-language surname. The word molenda used to mean miller, from Latin molendinator.

Notable people with this surname include:

- Bo Molenda (1905–1986), American football player
- Leszek Molenda (1953–1999), Polish volleyball player
