= Krzysztof Chrobak =

Polish football manager

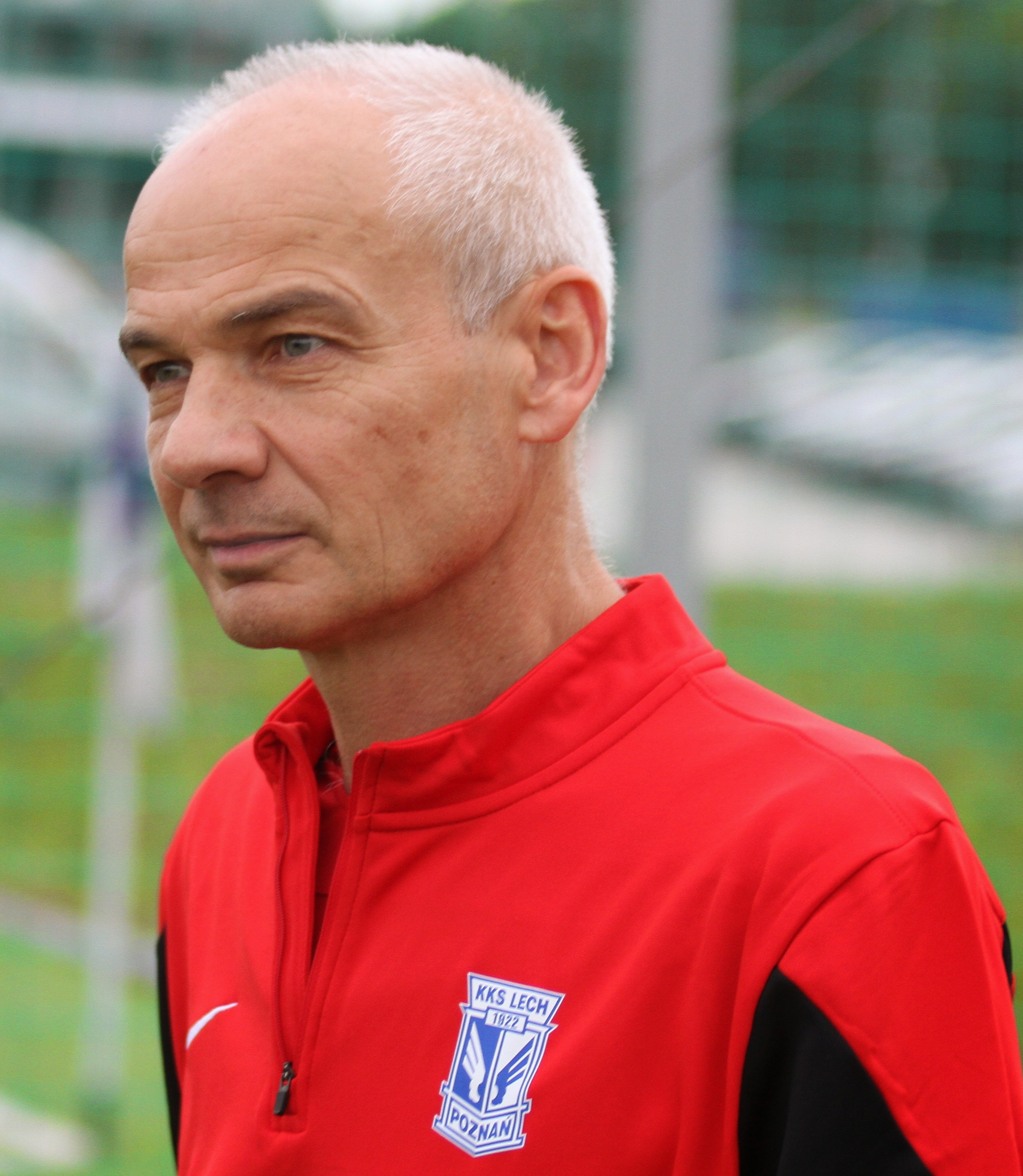

Personal information
- Date of birth: 3 October 1957 (age 69)
- Place of birth: Warsaw, Poland

Managerial career
- Years: Team
- 2002–2004: Polonia Warsaw
- 2005: Znicz Pruszków
- 2005–2006: Amica Wronki
- 2006–2008: Górnik Łęczna
- 2009: Znicz Pruszków
- 2011: Legionovia Legionowo
- 2014: Lech Poznań (caretaker)
- 2016–2017: Pogoń Grodzisk Mazowiecki
- 2017–2019: Polonia Warsaw
- 2020–2022: Pogoń Grodzisk Mazowiecki
- 2023–2024: Widzew Łódź II

Krzysztof Chrobak (born 3 October 1957) is a Polish professional football manager who was most recently in charge of Widzew Łódź II.

== Honours ==
Pogoń Grodzisk Mazowiecki

- III liga, group I: 2020–21
