= Narew Ostrołęka =

Polish football club

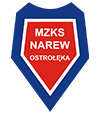
- Full name: MZKS Narew Ostrołęka
- Nicknames: Niebiesko-Czerwoni (The Blue and Reds); Narewka; Duma Kurpi (The Pride of Kurpie)
- Founded: 27 July 1962; 63 years ago 8 September 2016; 9 years ago (reactivated as MZKS Narew 1962)
- Ground: MOSiR Stadium
- Capacity: 5,000
- Chairman: Bartosz Siurnicki
- Manager: Łukasz Bałazy
- League: V liga Masovia I
- 2024–25: V liga Masovia I, 5th of 16
- Website: http://narew.ostroleka.pl/
Home colours	Away colours

MZKS Narew Ostrołęka is a Polish football club, currently playing in the V liga. The club was formed in 1962 as Narew Ostrołęka, but it was dissolved due to financial and organizational problems in 2015. On 8 September 2016, it was reactivated as MZKS Narew 1962 Ostrołęka, but it only cultivates the name and tradition of the previous Narew, and is not its continuator.

Narew started after reactivation from Klasa B in the 2017–18 season, achieving three promotions in four years. In the 2022–23 season, Narew was relegated to V liga Masovia I.

In November 2004, a home match against Dolcan Ząbki was covered by nationwide commercial television station Tele5. This was thought to be the first Polish 4th Division match shown on television. The game ended 0–2.

The stadium on Witos Street has capacity for 5,000 people, with 2,758 seated. The pitch measures 100 m x 70 m. Ostrołęka has over 50,000 citizens.

== Noted managers ==
Listed according to when they became managers for Narew Ostrołęka (year in parentheses):

- 2003–2004: Adam Popławski
- 2004–2005: Krzysztof Etmanowicz
- 2005–2006: Bogusław Oblewski, Wojciech Łazarek
- 2006–2007: Janusz Czapski, Waldemar Marczak, Krzysztof Etmanowicz, Sławomir Stanisławski
- 2007–2008: Sławomir Stanisławski, Piotr Zajączkowski
- 2008–2009: Cezary Moleda, Dariusz Janowski, Krzysztof Adamczyk
- 2009–2010: Krzysztof Adamczyk, Mateusz Miłoszewski
- 2010–2011: Mateusz Miłoszewski, Marcin Grabowski
- 2011–2012: Marcin Grabowski, Kazimierz Puławski
- 2012–2013: Marcin Roman
- 2013–2014: Dariusz Narolewski
- 2014–2015: Marian Szarama, Tomasz Słowik, Damian Dąbrowski
- 2016–2018: Rafał Kosek
- 2018: Marian Szarama
- 2018–2020: Dariusz Narolewski
- 2020–2022: Andrzej Sieradzki
- 2022: Marek Marciniak, Tomasz Staniórski
- 2023: Tomasz Staniórski, Damian Milewski, Marcin Gałązka
- 2024: Marcin Gałązka, Łukasz Bałazy
- 2025: Łukasz Bałazy
