= Pogoń Grodzisk Mazowiecki =

Polish football club

- Full name: Grodziski Klub Sportowy Pogoń Grodzisk Mazowiecki
- Founded: 1922; 104 years ago (as KS Świt)
- Ground: Miejski Stadion Sportowy; MZOS Stadium
- Capacity: 1,000; 1,977
- Chairman: Jakub Dębiec (acting)
- Manager: Tomasz Kafarski
- League: I liga
- 2025–26: I liga, 11th of 18
- Website: pogongrodzisk.pl
| Home colours | Away colours |

Pogoń Grodzisk Mazowiecki is a Polish football club based in Grodzisk Mazowiecki, Masovian Voivodeship. They compete in the I liga in the 2026–27 season.

Previously, their highest league tier was the II liga, with their first promotion in 1958 (then known as the III liga). They were promoted to this level again after winning group I of the 2020–21 III liga, ensuring the promotion with two games left after beating Jagiellonia Białystok II 6–0.

== Honours ==
- III liga, group I
  - Champions: 2020–21, 2023–24
- IV liga Masovia
  - Champions: 2011–12 (South), 2016–17 (North), 2018–19 (South)
- Polish Cup (Masovia regionals)
  - Winners: 2023–24

== Players ==
=== Current squad ===
As of 15 September 2026

Note: Flags indicate national team as defined under FIFA eligibility rules; some limited exceptions apply. Players may hold more than one non-FIFA nationality.

| No. | Pos. | Nation | Player |
|---|---|---|---|
| 1 | GK | POL | Krzysztof Kamiński |
| 2 | DF | POL | Kamil Głogowski |
| 3 | DF | POL | Bartosz Dembek (on loan from Legia Warsaw II) |
| 4 | MF | POL | Maciej Ruszkiewicz |
| 5 | MF | BRA | Matheus Dias |
| 6 | DF | POL | Jan Krupa |
| 7 | MF | POL | Jakub Jędrasik |
| 8 | DF | POL | Grzegorz Gulczyński |
| 9 | MF | POL | Radosław Majewski |
| 10 | MF | POL | Damian Jaroń (captain) |
| 11 | MF | POL | Kamil Kargulewicz |
| 14 | MF | NGA | Henry Uzoigwe |
| 15 | DF | POL | Nikodem Niski |

| No. | Pos. | Nation | Player |
|---|---|---|---|
| 17 | DF | POL | Jakub Niewiadomski |
| 19 | FW | POL | Hubert Turski |
| 20 | FW | ALB | Aldrit Oshafi |
| 21 | MF | POL | Kacper Łoś |
| 23 | MF | POL | Bartłomiej Ciepiela |
| 25 | GK | POL | Mikołaj Glacel |
| 26 | GK | POL | Juliusz Osuchowski |
| 27 | MF | POL | Jakub Konstantyn |
| 42 | MF | POL | Jakub Zbróg (on loan from Legia Warsaw II) |
| 68 | MF | POL | Jakub Miazgowski |
| 99 | DF | POL | Oskar Koprowski |
| — | MF | POL | Filip Mączka |

=== Out on loan ===
Note: Flags indicate national team as defined under FIFA eligibility rules; some limited exceptions apply. Players may hold more than one non-FIFA nationality.

| No. | Pos. | Nation | Player |
|---|---|---|---|
| — | MF | POL | Szymon Kolak (at Mszczonowianka Mszczonów until 30 June 2027) |

== Managerial history ==
Caretaker managers listed in italics.

- (Poland) Janusz Wójcik (July 1981 – June 1982)
- (Poland) Marek Zub (1 January 2002 – June 2002)
- (Poland) Piotr Wiśnik (2003 – May 2004)
- (Poland) Tomasz Matuszewski (May 2004 – 2005)
- (Poland) Robert Brudziński (2 December 2005 – April 2006)
- (Poland) Andrzej Malinowski (29 April 2006 – 9 May 2006)
- (Poland) Grzegorz Zmitrowicz (9 May 2006 – December 2006)
- (Poland) Krzysztof Etmanowicz (7 December 2006 – June 2008)
- (Poland) Marek Krzywicki (June 2008 – June 2009)
- (Poland) Rafał Smalec (1 July 2009 – May 2013)
- (Poland) Piotr Kotlenga & Tomasz Feliksiak (23 May 2013 – 24 June 2013)
- (Poland) Tomasz Matuszewski (24 June 2013 – December 2015)
- (Poland) Marek Konko (8 December 2015 – 18 April 2016)
- (Poland) Jakub Dębiec & Maciej Tataj (19 April 2016 – 27 June 2016)
- (Poland) Krzysztof Chrobak (27 June 2016 – 30 June 2017)
- (Poland) Robert Moskal (1 July 2018 – 13 December 2019)
- (Poland) Krzysztof Chrobak (13 December 2019 – 29 March 2022)
- (Poland) Mateusz Dudek (29 March 2022 – 30 June 2023)
- (Poland) Marcin Sasal (1 July 2023 – 2 June 2025)
- (Poland) Adam Mrówka (2 June 2025 – 30 June 2025)
- (Poland) Piotr Stokowiec (1 July 2025 – 30 June 2026)
- (Poland) Tomasz Kafarski (1 July 2026 – present)
