= 2026–27 Śląsk Wrocław season =

Śląsk Wrocław
2026–27 season
- Manager: Ante Šimundža
- Stadium: Wrocław Stadium
- Ekstraklasa: Pre-season
- Polish Cup: Pre-season

The 2026–27 season is the 80th season in the history of Śląsk Wrocław and their first season back in the Ekstraklasa after one season. The club will also compete in the Polish Cup.

== Transfers ==
=== In ===
Pos.	Player	Transferred from	Fee	Date	Source
DF	(Poland) Tommaso Guercio	(Italy) Carrarese	Loan return	30 June 2026	
GK	(Poland) Karol Niemczycki	(Israel) Ashdod	Free	1 July 2026	
MF	(Poland) Grzegorz Tomasiewicz	(Poland) Piast Gliwice	Free	1 July 2026	
MF	(Albania) Eniss Shabani	(Croatia) Vukovar 1991	Free	1 July 2026	
DF	(Poland) Dominik Szala	(Poland) Górnik Zabrze	Loan	2 July 2026	
DF	(Sweden) Alex Timossi Andersson	(Sweden) IF Brommapojkarna	Free	7 July 2026	

=== Out ===
Pos.	Player	Transferred to	Fee	Date	Source
DF	(Poland) Krzysztof Kurowski	(Netherlands) Twente	Free	1 July 2026	
MF	(Czech Republic) Petr Schwarz	Retiring		1 July 2026	

== Pre-season and friendlies ==
27 June 2026 Friendly	Bielawianka Bielawa (Poland)	0–11	(Poland) Śląsk Wrocław
15:00

4 July 2026 Friendly	Śląsk Wrocław (Poland)	v	(Poland) Warta Poznań
14:00

4 July 2026 Friendly	Śląsk Wrocław (Poland)	4–1	(Poland) Chrobry Głogów
18:00	Banaszak 24' (pen.), 38'; Warchoł 62'; 89'		84'

8 July 2026 Friendly	Śląsk Wrocław (Poland)	6–0	(Poland) Lechia Zielona Góra
17:00

11 July 2026 Friendly	Śląsk Wrocław (Poland)	0–0	(Poland) Odra Opole
17:00

18 July 2026 Friendly	Śląsk Wrocław (Poland)	3–1	(Czech Republic) Zlín
12:00	Marjanac 10', 6+'; Rosiak 43'; Niemczycki (red card) 81'		Šmiga 55'

== Competitions ==
=== Ekstraklasa ===
Pos	Team	Pld	W	D	L	GF	GA	GD	Pts	Qualification or relegation
14	Radomiak Radom	14	4	2	8	17	29	−12	14	
15	Cracovia	14	3	3	8	16	23	−7	12	
16	Raków Częstochowa	14	4	0	10	23	31	−8	12	Relegation to I liga
17	Śląsk Wrocław	14	2	4	8	17	25	−8	10	Relegation to I liga
18	Wieczysta Kraków	14	2	2	10	18	28	−10	8	Relegation to I liga

Updated to match(es) played on 8 November 2026. Source: ekstraklasa.org 90minut.pl
Rules for classification: 1) Points; 2) Head-to-head points; 3) Head-to-head goal difference; 4) Goal difference; 5) Goals scored; 6) Number of wins; 7) Number of away wins; 8) Lower number of points based on yellow and red cards (red card = 3 points, yellow card = 1 point, sending-off = 3 points - including 1 point for first yellow card); 9) Fairplay ranking; 10) Draw.
(Note: Head-to-head record is used only after all the matches between the teams in question have been played)

==== Results summary ====
Overall								Home						Away					
Pld	W	D	L	GF	GA	GD	Pts	W	D	L	GF	GA	GD	W	D	L	GF	GA	GD
14	2	4	8	17	25	−8	10	2	3	2	9	10	−1	0	1	6	8	15	−7

Last updated: 7 November 2026.
Source: soccerway

===== Results by round =====
Round	1	2	3	4	5	6	7	8	9	10	11	12	13	14	15	16
Ground	A	H	H	A	H	A	A	H	A	H	A	H	A	H	A	H
Result	L	W	D	L	D	D	L	L	L	L	L	W	L	D		
Position	14	9	10	12	11	14	14	15	15	17	17	15	16	17		

Updated to match(es) played on 7 November 2026. Source: worldfootball
A = Away; H = Home; W = Win; D = Draw; L = Loss

==== Matches ====
25 July 2026 1	Górnik Zabrze	2–1	Śląsk Wrocław	Zabrze
17:30	Matsenko 65' (o.g.); Ikia Dimi 79'		Banaszak 7'

2 August 2026 2	Śląsk Wrocław	2-1	Raków Częstochowa	Wrocław
17:30	Marjanac 86'; Samiec-Talar 90'		Emreli 60'	Stadium: Wrocław Stadium; Attendance: 22,841; Referee: Szymon Marciniak

9 August 2026 3	Śląsk Wrocław	0-0	Cracovia	Wrocław
14:45	Ba (red card) 82'	Report	Klich (yellow card) 45+2'; Kameri (yellow card) 90+1'; Henriksson (yellow card) 90+3'	Stadium: Wrocław Stadium; Attendance: 17,728; Referee: (Poland) Bartosz Frankowski

15 August 2026 4	Zagłębie Lubin	2-1	Śląsk Wrocław	Lubin
14:45	Ćorluka 52'; Szabó 85' (yellow card) 86'; Reguła (yellow card) 87'	Report	Llinares (yellow card) 10'; Tomasiewicz (yellow card) 22'; Samiec-Talar 34'	Stadium: KGHM Zagłębie Arena; Attendance: 10,100; Referee: (Poland) Mateusz Piszczelok

22 August 2026 5	Śląsk Wrocław	3-3	Widzew Łódź	Wrocław
20:15	Kapuadi 47' (o.g.); Rosiak (yellow card) 57'; Tomasiewicz (yellow card) 62'; Shabani (yellow card) 69' (goal) 89'; Banaszak 78'	Report	Wiśniewski (red card) 7'; Kapuadi (yellow card) 11'; García 15'; Álvarez 36'; Selahi (yellow card) 42'; Baena 63'; Żyro (yellow card) 88'	Stadium: Wrocław Stadium; Attendance: 21,205; Referee: (Poland) Marcin Kochanek

28 August 2026 6	Legia Warsaw	1-1	Śląsk Wrocław	Warsaw
20:30	Wszołek (yellow card) 90+2'; Adamski 90+4'	Report	Samiec-Talar 35' (pen.); Shabani (yellow card) 41'; Šimundža (yellow card) 62'; Rosiak (yellow card) 90+5'	Stadium: Polish Army Stadium; Attendance: 27,072; Referee: (Poland) Marcin Szczerbowicz

6 September 2026 7	Jagiellonia Białystok	2-1	Śląsk Wrocław	Białystok
20:15	Szmyt 19'; Sow 41'; Montóia (yellow card) 85'	Report	Andersson (yellow card) 65'; Samiec-Talar 81' (pen.)	Stadium: Chorten Arena; Attendance: 16,673; Referee: (Poland) Paweł Malec

12 September 2026 8	Śląsk Wrocław	1-2	Korona Kielce	Wrocław
14:45	Dembélé 79'; Linetty (yellow card) 85'	Report	Stępiński 35'; Gustafson 90+3'	Stadium: Wrocław Stadium; Attendance: 14,583; Referee: (Poland) Piotr Rzucidło

18 September 2026 9	Wisła Kraków	2-1	Śląsk Wrocław	Kraków
20:30	Rodado 16'; Giger (yellow card) 35'; Youan (yellow card) 49'; Jop (yellow card) 88'; Uryga 90+3'	Report	Shabani (yellow card) 71'; Adam Ciućka 76'; Llinares (yellow card) 84'; Luka Marjanac (yellow card) 90+1'	Stadium: Henryk Reyman Municipal Stadium; Attendance: 33,000; Referee: (Poland) Łukasz Kuźma
