= 2026–27 Motor Lublin season =

Motor Lublin
2026–27 season
- Manager: Mariusz Misiura
- Stadium: Arena Lublin
- Ekstraklasa: Pre-season
- Polish Cup: Pre-season

The 2026–27 season is the 77th season of Motor Lublin and their third consecutive season in the Ekstraklasa. The club will also compete in the Polish Cup.

== Transfers ==
=== In ===
Pos.	Player	Transferred from	Fee	Date	Source
GK	(Romania) Mihai Popa	(Romania) CFR Cluj	Undisclosed	1 July 2026	
DF	(Poland) Bartosz Bereszyński	(Italy) Palermo	Free	3 July 2026	
MF	(Poland) Mateusz Łęgowski	(Turkey) Eyüpspor	Free	4 July 2026	
MF	(Comoros) Yacine Bourhane	(Cyprus) Aris Limassol FC	Free	14 July 2026	

=== Out ===
Pos.	Player	Transferred to	Fee	Date	Source
GK	(Croatia) Ivan Brkić	(Poland) Legia Warsaw	End of contract	1 July 2026	
FW	(Azerbaijan) Renat Dadaşov		End of contract	1 July 2026	
FW	(Poland) Kacper Karasek	(Poland) Radomiak Radom	End of contract	1 July 2026	
MF	(Poland) Jakub Łabojko	(Poland) Piast Gliwice	End of contract	1 July 2026	
GK	(Spain) Sergi Samper	(Hungary) Debreceni VSC	End of contract	1 July 2026	
MF	(Poland) Bartosz Wolski	(Poland) GKS Katowice	Undisclosed	1 July 2026	
DF	(Poland) Bright Ede	(Spain) Deportivo de A Coruña	€6,000,000	7 July 2026	

== Pre-season ==
27 June 2026 Friendly	Motor Lublin (Poland)	3–1	(Romania) Dinamo București
17:00

3 July 2026 Friendly	Motor Lublin (Poland)	4–1	(Poland) Warta Poznań
14:00	7'; 59', 68'; 83'		89'

== Competitions ==
=== Ekstraklasa ===
Pos	Team	Pld	W	D	L	GF	GA	GD	Pts
11	Korona Kielce	4	1	2	1	4	4	0	5
12	Śląsk Wrocław	5	1	2	2	7	8	−1	5
13	Motor Lublin	5	1	2	2	6	8	−2	5
14	Piast Gliwice	5	1	1	3	8	13	−5	4
15	Wisła Płock	4	1	1	2	3	8	−5	4

Updated to match(es) played on 23 August 2026. Source: ekstraklasa.org 90minut.pl
Rules for classification: 1) Points; 2) Head-to-head points; 3) Head-to-head goal difference; 4) Goal difference; 5) Goals scored; 6) Number of wins; 7) Number of away wins; 8) Lower number of points based on yellow and red cards (red card = 3 points, yellow card = 1 point, sending-off = 3 points - including 1 point for first yellow card); 9) Fairplay ranking; 10) Draw.
(Note: Head-to-head record is used only after all the matches between the teams in question have been played)

==== Matches ====
26 July 2026 1	Widzew Łódź	2–2	Motor Lublin	Łódź
17:30	Fornalczyk 20'; Bergier 28' (pen.)		Bergier 13' (o.g.); Ndiaye 49'
