= 2026–27 Legia Warsaw season =

Legia Warsaw
2026–27 season
- Chairman: Dariusz Mioduski
- Manager: Marek Papszun
- Stadium: Polish Army Stadium
- Ekstraklasa: 1st
- Polish Cup: Round of 32
| Home colours | Away colours |

The 2026–27 season is Legia Warsaw's 109th season in existence and the club's 78th consecutive season in the top flight of Polish football. In addition to the domestic league, they will also participate in this season's editions of the Polish Cup. The season covers the period from 1 July 2026 to 30 June 2027.

== Review ==
=== Background ===
The 2025–26 season was a disappointing one for many Legia Warsaw fans. Despite qualifying for the league phase of the UEFA Conference League, Legia Warsaw disappointed by finishing 28th and failing to advance to the knockout stage. In the domestic league, Legia underperformed for most of the season, spending a long time in the relegation zone. Only a successful spring campaign allowed the team to escape trouble and climb the table. In the final round, Legia was even fighting for 5th place, which would have secured qualification for European competitions, but ultimately finished 6th, just one point short.

== Board and management team ==
| Position | Name |
|---|---|
| President of the Management Board and Owner | (Poland) Dariusz Mioduski |
| Vice Presidents of the Management Board | (Poland) Marcin Herra |
| Sporting Advisor to the Board | (Poland) Jacek Zieliński |
| Supervisory Board | (Poland) Anna Mioduska (President), (Poland) Jarosław Jankowski, (Poland) Jerzy Kowalski, (Poland) Marian Owerko, (Poland) Robert Jędrzejczyk |
| Scouting Director | (Poland) Piotr Zasada |
| Head of Football Operations | (Germany) Fredi Bobic |

- Last updated: June 2025

== First team ==
=== Coaching staff ===
| Position | Name |
|---|---|
| Head coach | (Poland) Marek Papszun |
| Assistant coaches | (Poland) Artur Węska, (Poland) Marek Wasiluk, (Spain) Inaki Astiz |
| Goalkeeping coaches | (Poland) Maciej Kowal, (Poland) Paweł Szajewski |
| Fitness coaches | (Poland) Bartosz Bibrowicz, (Poland) Michał Garnys |
| Analysts | (Poland) Łukasz Cebula, (Poland) Maciej Krzemień, (Poland) Bartłomiej Kuźma |

- Last updated: August 2026

=== First-team squad ===
| No. | Player | Nat. | Positions | Date of birth (age) | Signed in | Contract ends | Previous club | Transfer fee |
Goalkeepers
| 1 | Ivan Brkić | (Croatia) | GK | 29 June 1995 (age 31) | 2026 | 2029 | (Poland) Motor Lublin | Free |
| 59 | Jan Bienduga (U21) | (Poland) | GK | 10 August 2008 (age 18) | 2022 | 2029 | (Poland) SEMP Ursynów | |
| 89 | Otto Hindrich | (Romania) | GK | 5 August 2002 (age 23) | 2026 | 2030 | (Romania) CFR Cluj | €0.8M |
Defenders
| 5 | Robert Deziel Junior | (United States) | CB | 30 June 2005 (age 21) | 2026 | 2030 | (Germany) FC Bayern Munich II | Free |
| 8 | Rafał Augustyniak | (Poland) | CB / DM | 14 October 1993 (age 32) | 2022 | 2027 | (Russia) FC Ural Yekaterinburg | Free |
| 13 | Arkadiusz Reca | (Poland) | LB / LW | 17 June 1995 (age 31) | 2025 | 2028 | (Italy) Spezia Calcio | Free |
| 19 | Rúben Vinagre | (Portugal) | LB / LW | 9 April 1999 (age 27) | 2024 | 2028 | (Portugal) Sporting CP | €2.5M |
| 30 | Petar Stojanović | (Slovenia) | RB | 7 October 1995 (age 30) | 2025 | 2028 | (Italy) US Salernitana 1919 | Free |
| 91 | Kamil Piątkowski | (Poland) | CB | 21 June 2000 (age 26) | 2025 | 2029 | (Austria) FC Red Bull Salzburg | Free |
| - | Zoran Arsenić | (Croatia) | CB | 2 June 1994 (age 32) | 2026 | 2028 | (Poland) Raków Częstochowa | Free |
Midfielders
| 6 | Henrique Arreiol | (Portugal) | CM | 26 February 2005 (age 21) | 2025 | 2029 | (Portugal) Sporting CP | Free |
| 11 | Kacper Chodyna | (Poland) | RW | 24 May 1999 (age 27) | 2024 | 2028 | (Poland) Zagłębie Lubin | €0.86M |
| 20 | Jakub Żewłakow (U21) | (Poland) | AM | 2 December 2006 (age 19) | 2014 | 2030 | (Poland) Legia Warsaw II | Free |
| 21 | Vahan Bichakhchyan | (Armenia) | RW | 9 July 1999 (age 26) | 2025 | 2028 | (Poland) Pogoń Szczecin | €0.25M |
| 22 | Paweł Wszołek | (Poland) | RW | 30 April 1992 (age 34) | 2022 | 2027 | (Germany) 1. FC Union Berlin | Free |
| 23 | Michal Ševčík | | AM | 13 August 2002 (age 24) | 2026 | 2027 | (Czech Republic) AC Sparta Prague | Loan |
| 44 | Damian Szymański | (Poland) | CM | 16 June 1995 (age 31) | 2025 | 2029 | (Greece) AEK Athens F.C. | Free |
| 53 | Wojciech Urbański | (Poland) | AM | 12 January 2005 (age 21) | 2023 | 2025 | (Poland) Wisła Kraków U19 | ? |
| 67 | Bartosz Kapustka | (Poland) | CM | 23 December 1996 (age 29) | 2020 | 2028 | (England) Leicester City F.C. | Free |
| 71 | Mateusz Szczepaniak (U21) | (Poland) | RW | 5 January 2007 (age 19) | | 2027 | (Poland) Legia Warsaw II | Free |
Forwards
| 9 | Rafał Adamski | (Poland) | CF | 21 November 2001 (age 24) | 2026 | 2029 | (Poland) Pogoń Grodzisk Mazowiecki | |
| 14 | Antonio Čolak | (Croatia) | CF | 17 September 1993 (age 32) | 2025 | 2027 | (Italy) Spezia Calcio | |
| 29 | Mileta Rajović | (Denmark) | CF | 17 July 1999 (age 26) | 2025 | 2029 | (England) Watford F.C. | €3M |
| 79 | Łukasz Zjawiński | (Poland) | CF | 11 July 2001 (age 24) | 2026 | 2030 | (Poland) Polonia Warsaw | Free |

Notes:

- Player (U21) – Player who meets the PZPN’s Młodzieżowiec 2.0 programme criteria, i.e. a player holding Polish citizenship who, in the calendar year in which the playing season ends, turns 21 years old or younger. This season, these were players born in 2006 or later.
- – Player who left before the end of the season, but played in at least one official match.
- – Player who was loaned out before the end of the season, but played in at least one official match.

== Transfers ==
=== In ===
| Date | Position | Player | From | Fee | Ref |
|---|---|---|---|---|---|
| 18 May 2026 | GK | (Croatia) Ivan Brkić | (Poland) Motor Lublin | Free | |
| 25 May 2026 | CB | (Croatia) Zoran Arsenić | (Poland) Raków Częstochowa | Free | |
| 2 June 2026 | ST | (Poland) Łukasz Zjawiński | (Poland) Polonia Warsaw | Free | |
| 18 June 2026 | CB | (United States) Robert Deziel Jr. | (Germany) FC Bayern Munich II | Free | |

=== Out ===
| Date | Position | Player | Next club | Fee | Ref |
|---|---|---|---|---|---|
| 22 May 2026 | RW | (Kosovo) Ermal Krasniqi | (Czech Republic) AC Sparta Prague | End of loan | |
| 22 May 2026 | GK | (Poland) Kacper Tobiasz | (Czech Republic) Gaziantep | Free | |
| 22 May 2026 | CM | (Colombia) Juergen Elitim | (Turkey) Bursaspor | Free | |
| 22 May 2026 | CB | (Serbia) Radovan Pankov | (Indonesia) Persija Jakarta | Free | |
| 22 May 2026 | LB | (Poland) Patryk Kun | (Poland) Wisła Płock | Free | |
| 22 May 2026 | RW | (Kosovo) Ermal Krasniqi | (Czech Republic) AC Sparta Prague | End of loan | |
| 19 June 2026 | CB | (Poland) Artur Jędrzejczyk | Free agent | Free | |
| 23 June 2026 | CF | (Cameroon) Jean-Pierre Nsame | (Poland) Pogoń Szczecin | Free | |
| 27 June 2026 | CM | (Poland) Kacper Urbański | (Poland) Górnik Zabrze | Free | |
| 30 June 2026 | CB | (Spain) Sergio Barcia | (Portugal) Braga | €1.5M | |
| 30 June 2026 | DM | (Poland) Jakub Adkonis | (Poland) Lechia Gdańsk | Free | |
| 30 June 2026 | DM | (Poland) Pascal Mozie | (France) FC Annecy | Free | |
| 3 July 2026 | CB | (Poland) Jan Leszczyński | (Germany) Borussia Mönchengladbach | €3M | |
| 6 July 2026 | CM | (Portugal) Claude Gonçalves | (Slovenia) NK Maribor | Free | |
| 9 July 2026 | GK | (Poland) Marcel Mendes-Dudziński | (Poland) Piast Gliwice | Free | |

=== Loaned in ===
| Date | Position | Player | From | Date until | Ref |
|---|---|---|---|---|---|
| 10 July 2026 | | | | | |

=== Loaned out ===
| Date | Position | Player | To | Date until | Ref |

=== Overall transfer activity ===
==== Expenditure ====
Summer:

Winter:

Total:

==== Income ====
Summer:

Winter:

Total:

==== Net totals ====
Summer:

Winter:

Total:

== Pre-season and friendlies ==
Win Draw Loss Fixtures

=== Pre-season friendlies ===
| 27 June 2026 | FC Bayern Munich II | 0–2 | Legia Warsaw | Herzogenaurach, Germany |
| 16:30 CEST | | Legia.Net | Kapustka 27'; Adamski 58' | Stadium: adidas training centre |

| 2 July 2026 | 1. FC Nürnberg II | 2–2 | Legia Warsaw | Herzogenaurach, Germany |
| 17:00 CEST | Wiezorrek 13'; Rau 19' | Legia.Net | Adamski 37'; Rajović 77' (pen.) | Stadium: adidas training centre |

| 7 July 2026 | Legia Warsaw | 3–1 | Hapoel Be'er Sheva | Książenice |
| 16:30 CEST | Zjawiński 60' 66'; Wszołek 68' | Legia.Net | Ganah 24' | Stadium: Legia Training Center |

| 10 July 2026 | Legia Warsaw | 1–0 | AS Trenčín | Książenice |
| 16:00 CEST | Rajović 77' (pen.) | Legia.Net | | Stadium: Legia Training Center |

| 14 July 2026 | Legia Warsaw | 3–1 | Radomiak Radom | Książenice |
| 12:00 CEST | Deziel Junior 53'; Ševčík 68'; Piątkowski 74' | Legia.Net | Alves 11' (pen.) | Stadium: Legia Training Center |

| 18 July 2026 | Legia Warsaw | 2–1 | Pogoń Grodzisk Mazowiecki | Książenice |
| 13:00 CEST | Zjawiński 45'; Żewłakow 57' | Legia.Net | Jaroń 46' (pen.) | Stadium: Legia Training Center |

| 18 July 2026 | Legia Warsaw | 0–2 | Aris Limassol | Książenice |
| 17:00 CEST | | Legia.Net | Charalabous 41' (pen.); Nikolić 90+5' (pen.) | Stadium: Legia Training Center; Referee: Paweł Raczkowski |

=== Mid-season friendlies ===
| 26 September 2026 | Zagłębie Sosnowiec | 2–4 | Legia Warsaw | Sosnowiec |
| 14:00 CEST | Barć 38'; Gogół 57' (pen.) | 90minut.pl | Zjawiński 6', 45'; Reca 67', 90' | Stadium: ArcelorMittal Park; Attendance: 9,131; Referee: Mateusz Piszczelok (Katowice) |

== Competitions ==
=== Overview ===
| Competition | First match | Last match | Starting round | Final position | Record | | | | | | | |
| Competition | First match | Last match | Starting round | Final position | Pld | W | D | L | GF | GA | GD | Win % |
|---|---|---|---|---|---|---|---|---|---|---|---|---|
| Ekstraklasa | 24 Jul 2026 | 1 Jun 2025 | Matchday 1 | Matchday 34 | 8 | 4 | 4 | 0 | 16 | 7 | +9 | 50.00 |
| Polish Cup | 2 Aug 2026 | | Round of 32 | Round of 32 | 1 | 0 | 0 | 1 | 0 | 3 | −3 | 0.00 |
| Total | | | | | 9 | 4 | 4 | 1 | 16 | 10 | +6 | 44.44 |

Last updated: 13 Sep 2026
Source: Soccerway

=== Ekstraklasa ===
==== League table ====
| Pos | Team | Pld | W | D | L | GF | GA | GD | Pts | Qualification or relegation |
|---|---|---|---|---|---|---|---|---|---|---|
| 1 | Lech Poznań | 13 | 10 | 2 | 1 | 34 | 13 | +21 | 32 | Qualification for the Champions League play-off round |
| 2 | Górnik Zabrze | 14 | 9 | 4 | 1 | 23 | 12 | +11 | 31 | Qualification for the Champions League second qualifying round |
| 3 | Legia Warsaw | 14 | 6 | 6 | 2 | 25 | 15 | +10 | 24 | Qualification for the Europa League second qualifying round |
| 4 | Pogoń Szczecin | 13 | 7 | 3 | 3 | 20 | 15 | +5 | 24 | Qualification for the Conference League second qualifying round |
| 5 | Wisła Kraków | 14 | 7 | 3 | 4 | 22 | 19 | +3 | 24 | |

Updated to match(es) played on 8 November 2026. Source: ekstraklasa.org 90minut.pl
Rules for classification: 1) Points; 2) Head-to-head points; 3) Head-to-head goal difference; 4) Goal difference; 5) Goals scored; 6) Number of wins; 7) Number of away wins; 8) Lower number of points based on yellow and red cards (red card = 3 points, yellow card = 1 point, sending-off = 3 points - including 1 point for first yellow card); 9) Fairplay ranking; 10) Draw.
(Note: Head-to-head record is used only after all the matches between the teams in question have been played)

==== Results summary ====
| Overall | | | | | | | | Home | | | | | | Away | | | | | |
| Pld | W | D | L | GF | GA | GD | Pts | W | D | L | GF | GA | GD | W | D | L | GF | GA | GD |
|---|---|---|---|---|---|---|---|---|---|---|---|---|---|---|---|---|---|---|---|
| 14 | 6 | 6 | 2 | 25 | 15 | +10 | 24 | 3 | 2 | 2 | 15 | 9 | +6 | 3 | 4 | 0 | 10 | 6 | +4 |

Last updated: 8 Nov 2026.
Source: Legia Warsaw

==== Results by round ====
| Round | 1 | 2 | 3 | 4 | 5 | 6 | 7 | 8 | 9 | 10 | 11 | 12 | 13 | 14 | 15 | 16 | 17 | 18 | 19 | 20 | 21 | 22 | 23 | 24 | 25 | 26 | 27 | 28 | 29 | 30 | 31 | 32 | 33 | 34 |
|---|---|---|---|---|---|---|---|---|---|---|---|---|---|---|---|---|---|---|---|---|---|---|---|---|---|---|---|---|---|---|---|---|---|---|
| Ground | A | H | A | H | A | H | A | H | A | H | A | H | A | H | | | | | | | | | | | | | | | | | | | | |
| Result | W | W | D | W | D | D | W | D | W | W | D | L | D | L | | | | | | | | | | | | | | | | | | | | |
| Position | 6 | 1 | 2 | 1 | 1 | 1 | 2 | 2 | 2 | 3 | 3 | 4 | 3 | 3 | | | | | | | | | | | | | | | | | | | | |
| Points | 3 | 6 | 7 | 10 | 11 | 12 | 15 | 16 | 19 | 22 | 23 | 23 | 24 | 24 | | | | | | | | | | | | | | | | | | | | |

Updated to match(es) played on 8 Nov 2026. Source: PKO Ekstraklasa
A = Away; H = Home; W = Win; D = Draw; L = Loss

==== Matches ====
| 24 July 2026 1 | Pogoń Szczecin | 0–1 | Legia Warsaw | Szczecin |
| 20:30 CEST | | Report | Arsenić 90+6' | Stadium: Florian Krygier Stadium; Attendance: 20,757; Referee: Bartosz Frankowski |

| 2 August 2026 2 | Legia Warsaw | 3–1 | Zagłębie Lubin | Warsaw |
| 14:45 CEST | Zjawiński 25'; Vinagre 72'; Adamski 90+1' | Report | Kocaba 4' | Stadium: Polish Army Stadium; Attendance: 26,762; Referee: Karol Arys |

| 8 August 2026 3 | Korona Kielce | 1–1 | Legia Warsaw | Kielce |
| 20:15 CEST | Stępiński 70' | Report | Zjawiński 28' | Stadium: Stadion Miejski; Attendance: 14,561; Referee: Jarosław Przybył |

| 14 August 2026 4 | Legia Warsaw | 5–0 | Radomiak Radom | Warsaw |
| 20:30CEST | Ševčík 7'; Augustyniak 10'; Adamski 17'; Kapustka 44', 51' | Report | | Stadium: Polish Army Stadium; Attendance: 26,473; Referee: Wojciech Myć |

| 22 August 2026 5 | Piast Gliwice | 1–1 | Legia Warsaw | Gliwice |
| 17:30 CEST | Sanca 90+5' | Report | Zjawiński 7' | Stadium: Piotr Wieczorek Stadium; Attendance: 7,008; Referee: Bartosz Frankowski |

| 28 August 2026 6 | Legia Warsaw | 1–1 | Śląsk Wrocław | Warsaw |
| 20:30 CEST | Adamski 90+4' | Report | Samiec-Talar 35' (pen.) | Stadium: Polish Army Stadium; Attendance: 27,072; Referee: Marcin Szczerbowicz |

| 5 September 2026 7 | Motor Lublin | 2–3 | Legia Warsaw | Lublin |
| 20:15 CEST | Czubak 65', 68' | Report | Augustyniak 45' (pen.); Żewłakow 90+5', 90+11' | Stadium: Arena Lublin; Attendance: 15,200; Referee: Jarosław Przybył |

| 13 September 2026 8 | Legia Warsaw | 1–1 | Widzew Łódź | Warsaw |
| 17:30 CEST | Augustyniak 19' | Report | Piątkowski 21' (o.g.) | Stadium: Polish Army Stadium; Attendance: 27,098; Referee: Jarosław Przybył |

| 20 September 2026 9 | Jagiellonia Białystok | 1–3 | Legia Warsaw | Białystok |
| 17:30 CEST | Imaz 35' (pen.) | Report | Augustyniak 15' (pen.); Prelec 20' (o.g.); Wszołek 75' | Stadium: Chorten Arena; Attendance: 20,456; Referee: Karol Arys |

| 11 October 2026 10 | Legia Warsaw | 2–0 | Wisła Kraków | Warsaw |
| 20:15 CEST | Zjawiński 18'; Adamski 70' | Report | | Stadium: Polish Army Stadium; Attendance: 26,352; Referee: Damian Sylwestrzak |

| 17 October 2026 11 | Cracovia | 1–1 | Legia Warsaw | Kraków |
| 20:15 CEST | Nordås 44' | Report | Ševčík 26' | Stadium: Józef Piłsudski Cracovia Stadium; Attendance: 14,018; Referee: Piotr Lasyk |

| 25 October 2026 12 | Legia Warsaw | 1–2 | Lech Poznań | Warsaw |
| 17:30 CET | Viunnyk 74' | Report | Agnero 56'; Palma 87' | Stadium: Polish Army Stadium; Attendance: 27,410; Referee: Szymon Marciniak |

| 30 October 2026 13 | Górnik Zabrze | 0–0 | Legia Warsaw | Zabrze |
| 20:30 CET | | Report | | Stadium: Arena Zabrze; Attendance: 27,659; Referee: Marcin Szczerbowicz |

| 8 November 2026 14 | Legia Warsaw | 2–4 | Raków Częstochowa | Warsaw |
| 17:30 CET | Chodyna 56'; Bichakhchyan 63' | Report | Makuch 21'; Otieno 58'; Oliwier Kwiatkowski 61', 72' | Stadium: Polish Army Stadium; Attendance: 24,337; Referee: Jarosław Przybył |

=== Polish Cup ===
| 1 September 2026 Round of 32 | Motor Lublin | 3–0 | Legia Warsaw | Lublin |
| 18:00 CET | Czubak 3'; Ronaldo 40'; N'Diaye 90' | Report | | Stadium: Arena Lublin; Attendance: 11,348; Referee: Piotr Lasyk (Bytom) |

== Statistics ==
=== Goalscorers ===
| Rank | Number | Position | Nation | Name | Ekstraklasa | Polish Cup | Total | Career club total |
|---|---|---|---|---|---|---|---|---|
| 1 | 79 | FW | (Poland) | Łukasz Zjawiński | 2 | 0 | 2 | 2 |
| 2 | 9 | FW | (Poland) | Rafał Adamski | 2 | 0 | 2 | 4 |
| 3 | 67 | AM | (Poland) | Bartosz Kapustka | 2 | 0 | 2 | 27 |
| 4 | 24 | CB | (Croatia) | Zoran Arsenić | 1 | 0 | 1 | 1 |
| 5 | 19 | LW | (Portugal) | Rúben Vinagre | 1 | 0 | 1 | 3 |
| 6 | 8 | CB | (Poland) | Rafał Augustyniak | 1 | 0 | 1 | 16 |
| Own goals | | | | | | | | |
| TOTALS | | | | | 10 | 0 | 10 | |

Last updated: 15 Aug 2026.
Source: FBref.com

==== Hat-tricks ====
Includes all competitions for senior teams. Players with no hat-tricks not included in the list.

Keys

- Score – The score at the time of each goal. Legia's score listed first.
- Final score – The score at full time; Legia's listed first.

=== Assists ===
| Place | Number | Position | Nation | Name | Ekstraklasa | Polish Cup | Total |
|---|---|---|---|---|---|---|---|
| 1 | 22 | RW | (Poland) | Paweł Wszołek | 4 | 0 | 4 |
| 2 | 21 | RW | (Armenia) | Vahan Bichakhchyan | 1 | 0 | 1 |
| 3 | 91 | CB | (Poland) | Kamil Piątkowski | 1 | 0 | 1 |
| 4 | 19 | LW | (Portugal) | Rúben Vinagre | 1 | 0 | 1 |
| TOTALS | | | | | 7 | 0 | 7 |

Last updated: 15 Aug 2026.
Source: FBref.com

=== Home attendances ===
Matches played behind closed doors for which tickets could not be sold are not counted.

| | Matches | Total attendances | % | Average attendance | Highest attendance | % | Lowest attendance | % |
|---|---|---|---|---|---|---|---|---|
| Ekstraklasa | 1 | 26,762 | 86,0% | 26,762 | 26,762 | 86,0% | 26,762 | 86,0% |
| Polish Cup | - | - | - | - | - | - | - | - |
| All | 1 | 26,762 | 86,0% | 26,762 | 26,762 | 86,0% | 26,762 | 86,0% |

Last updated: 8 Aug 2026.
Source: legionisci.com

== Awards ==
=== Ekstraklasa Player of the Month ===
| Month | Player | Ref. |

=== Ekstraklasa Young Player of the Month ===
| Month | Player | Ref. |

== Milestones ==
=== Games ===
The following players made their competitive debuts for Legia's first team during the season.
