= 2020–21 Górnik Zabrze season =

Górnik Zabrze
2020-21 season
- Chairman: Bartosz Sarnowski
- Manager: Marcin Brosz
- Stadium: Arena Zabrze, Zabrze
- Ekstraklasa: 10th
- Polish Cup: Round of 16
- Top goalscorer: League: Jesús Jiménez (12); All: Jesús Jiménez (15)
Home colours	Away colours

Górnik Zabrze competed in Ekstraklasa and this season's edition of the Polish Cup.

== Players ==
As of 5 September 2020.

Note: Flags indicate national team as defined under FIFA eligibility rules; some limited exceptions apply. Players may hold more than one non-FIFA nationality.

No.	Pos.	Nation	Player
1	GK	POL	Dawid Kudła
2	DF	POL	Przemysław Wiśniewski
3	MF	POL	Krzysztof Kubica
4	DF	POL	Aleksander Paluszek
5	DF	GRE	Stefanos Evangelou
6	MF	SVK	Roman Procházka
7	MF	POL	Michał Rostkowski
8	MF	GAM	Alasana Manneh
9	MF	ESP	Jesús Jiménez
10	MF	POL	Łukasz Wolsztyński
11	MF	POL	Adam Ryczkowski
13	DF	POL	Kacper Michalski
14	DF	POL	Michał Koj

No.	Pos.	Nation	Player
15	MF	POL	Norbert Wojtuszek
16	DF	POL	Dariusz Pawłowski
17	MF	POL	Bartosz Nowak
18	MF	POL	Wojciech Hajda
20	MF	POL	Daniel Ściślak
21	FW	POL	Piotr Krawczyk
23	DF	GRE	Giannis Masouras (on loan from Olympiacos)
24	FW	AUT	Alex Sobczyk
27	DF	POL	Adrian Gryszkiewicz
31	GK	POL	Bartosz Neugebauer
44	MF	SRB	Filip Bainović
64	DF	SLO	Erik Janža
84	GK	SVK	Martin Chudý

== Competitions ==
=== Ekstraklasa ===
==== Standings ====
Pos	Team	Pld	W	D	L	GF	GA	GD	Pts
8	Zagłębie Lubin	30	11	8	11	38	40	−2	41
9	Jagiellonia Białystok	30	10	7	13	39	48	−9	37 (Note: Head-to-head points: Jagiellonia Białystok 9, Górnik Zabrze 5, Lech Poznań 2.)
10	Górnik Zabrze	30	10	7	13	31	33	−2	37
11	Lech Poznań	30	9	10	11	39	38	+1	37
12	Wisła Płock	30	8	9	13	37	44	−7	33 (Note: Head-to-head matches: Wisła Kraków 0–3 Wisła Płock, Wisła Płock 1–3 Wisła Kraków.)

Source: ekstraklasa.org
Rules for classification: 1) Points; 2) Head-to-head points; 3) Head-to-head goal difference; 4) Head-to-head goals scored; 5) Head-to-head away goals scored (only if between two teams); 6) Goal difference; 7) Goals scored; 8) Number of wins; 9) Number of away wins; 10) Fairplay ranking; 11) Draw

==== Results summary ====
Overall								Home						Away					
Pld	W	D	L	GF	GA	GD	Pts	W	D	L	GF	GA	GD	W	D	L	GF	GA	GD
14	7	2	5	18	14	+4	23	3	1	3	11	10	+1	4	1	2	7	4	+3

Last updated: 20 December 2020.
Source: Soccerway

===== Results by round =====
Round	1	2	3	4	5	6	7	8	9	10	11	12	13	14	15
Ground	H	A	H	A	H	A	H	A	A	H	H	A	H	A	H
Result	W	W	W	W	D	L	L	W	D	L	W	W	L	L	
Position	1	1	1	1	1	1	1	2	2	2	3	3	5	5	

Updated to match(es) played on 20 December 2020. Source:
A = Away; H = Home; W = Win; D = Draw; L = Loss

==== Matches ====
23 August 2020 1	Górnik Zabrze	4–2	Podbeskidzie	Zabrze
17:30 CET	Jesús Jiménez 1' 23' (pen.) 90+1'; Krawczyk 45+1'; Hajda (yellow card) 87'	Report	Biliński (yellow card) 4' (goal) 57' 82'; Bashlay (yellow card) 22'; Michał Rzuchowski (yellow card) 48'	Stadium: Arena Zabrze; Attendance: 7,368; Referee: (Poland) Mariusz Zlotek

28 August 2020 2	Stal Mielec	0–2	Górnik Zabrze	Mielec
20:30 CET	Kościelny (yellow card) 39'; Tomasiewicz (yellow card) 78'	Report	Bochniewicz 36'; Sobczyk (yellow card) 38'; Manneh 47'; Wiśniewski (yellow card) 58'	Stadium: Stadion MOSIR; Attendance: 3,420; Referee: (Poland) Paweł Gil

13 September 2020 3	Górnik Zabrze	3–0	Lechia Gdańsk	Zabrze
17:30 CET	Jesús Jiménez 34' (pen.); Koj (yellow card) 53'; Procházka (yellow card) 57'; Nowak 60'; Ściślak 81'	Report	Sopoćko (yellow card) 88'	Stadium: Arena Zabrze; Attendance: 10,270; Referee: (Poland) Daniel Stefański

19 September 2020 4	Legia Warsaw	1–3	Górnik Zabrze	Warsaw
20:00 CET	Slisz 60'; Rafael Lopes (yellow card) 70'; Juranović (yellow card) 90+5'	Report	Sobczyk 4'; Nowak 17'; Jesús Jiménez 47'; Wiśniewski (yellow card) 54'	Stadium: Stadion Wojska Polskiego; Attendance: 11,510; Referee: (Poland) Paweł Gil

25 September 2020 5	Górnik Zabrze	0–0	Wisła Kraków	Zabrze
20:30 CET	Janža (yellow card) 32'; Manneh (yellow card) 33'	Report	Frydrych (yellow card) 12'; Mehremić (yellow card) 39'; Burliga (yellow card) 90+4'	Stadium: Arena Zabrze; Attendance: 12,492; Referee: (Poland) Szymon Marciniak

3 October 2020 6	Zagłębie Lubin	2–0	Górnik Zabrze	Lubin
20:00 CET	Chudý 39' (o.g.); Szysz 45'; Sirk (yellow card) 90+1'	Report	Manneh (yellow card) 47'	Stadium: Zagłębie Lubin Stadium; Attendance: 2,883; Referee: (Poland) Jarosław Przybył

17 October 2020 7	Górnik Zabrze	1–3	Raków Częstochowa	Zabrze
17:30 CET	Nowak 4'; Masouras (yellow card) 44'; Manneh (yellow card) 48'; Janža (yellow card) 51'	Report	Ivi 20' 52'; Tijanić 31'	Stadium: Arena Zabrze; Attendance: 0 Referee: (Poland) Tomasz Kwiatkowski

26 October 2020 8	Warta Poznań	0–1	Górnik Zabrze	Grodzisk Wielkopolski
18:00 CET	Adrian Laskowski (yellow card) 55'	Report	Masouras (yellow card) 17'; Jesús Jiménez 55' (pen.)	Stadium: Stadion Groclinu Dyskobolii; Attendance: 0 Referee: (Poland) Łukasz Szczech

=== Polish Cup ===
13 August 2020 Round of 64	Górnik Zabrze	3–1	Jagiellonia Białystok	Zabrze
20:30 CEST (UTC+02:00)	Nowak 15'; Jiménez 61'; Bochniewicz 66'	Łączy nas piłka 90minut	Puljić 33'	Stadium: Arena Zabrze; Attendance: 4,568; Referee: Wojciech Myć (Lublin)

30 October 2020 Round of 32	KSZO Ostrowiec Świętokrzyski	2–3	Górnik Zabrze	Ostrowiec Świętokrzyski
18:00 CET (UTC+01:00)	Trochim 3'; Zaklika 62'	Łączy nas piłka 90minut	Evangelou 39'; Wiśniewski 90+1'; Manneh 90+2'	Stadium: Miejski Stadion Sportowy "KSZO"; Attendance: 0 Referee: Karol Iwanowicz (Lublin)

10 February 2021 Round of 16	Raków Częstochowa	4–2	Górnik Zabrze	Bełchatów
20:30 CET (UTC+01:00)	Gutkovskis 3'; Ivi 13' 87' (pen.); Sapała (yellow card) 50'; Mikołajewski (yellow card) 70'; Piątkowski (yellow card) 90'; Jach 90+2'	Report	Kubica (yellow card) 23'; Nowak (yellow card) 33'; Jesús Jiménez 55' 72' (pen.); Wiśniewski (yellow card) 84'; Kudła (yellow card) 86'	Stadium: GIEKSA Arena; Attendance: 0 Referee: Łukasz Szczech (Warsaw)
