= Drągowski =

Drągowski (feminine: Drągowska, plural: Drągowscy), sometimes spelled Drongowski, is a Polish surname. It may refer to:

- Bartłomiej Drągowski (born 1997), Polish footballer
- Dariusz Drągowski (born 1970), Polish footballer
