= 2025–26 Widzew Łódź season =

Widzew Łódź
2025–26 season
- Manager: Željko Sopić (until 25 August); Patryk Czubak (26 August–15 October); Igor Jovićević (15 October–5 March); Aleksandar Vuković (from 5 March)
- Ekstraklasa: 12th
- Polish Cup: Quarter-finals
- Top goalscorer: League: Sebastian Bergier (12); All: Sebastian Bergier (12)
- Biggest win: Widzew Łódź 3–0 GKS Katowice

Widzew Łódź is competing in its 91st competitive season and its fourth consecutive season in the top-tier Ekstraklasa, as well as in the Polish Cup. On 25 August, Croatian head coach Željko Sopić was dismissed after six matches of the season, with the team having collected seven points. He was replaced by Patryk Czubak, who had previously served as his assistant coach. Under Czubak, the team recorded two league victories and three defeats, while in the Polish Cup they won their first match on penalties.

On 15 October, Croatian manager Igor Jovićević was appointed head coach on a contract running until June 2027, with an option for extension. On 5 March, Jovićević was dismissed following a defeat to GKS Katowice that resulted in the team's elimination from the Polish Cup, as well as a run of four points from five matches after the winter break.

== Transfers ==
=== In ===
Pos.	Player	Transferred from	Fee	Date	Source
MF	(Nigeria) Samuel Akere	(Bulgaria) Botev Plovdiv		1 July 2025	
MF	(Spain) Ángel Baena	(Poland) Wisła Kraków	Free	1 July 2025	
FW	(Poland) Sebastian Bergier	(Poland) GKS Katowice	Free	1 July 2025	
MF	(Poland) Mariusz Fornalczyk	(Poland) Korona Kielce		1 July 2025	
DF	(Kosovo) Dion Gallapeni	(Kosovo) Prishtina		1 July 2025	
FW	(Poland) Antoni Klukowski	(Poland) Pogoń Szczecin	Free	1 July 2025	
MF	(Albania) Lindon Selahi	(Croatia) Rijeka	Free	1 July 2025	
DF	(Denmark) Peter Therkildsen	(Sweden) Djurgården		1 July 2025	
DF	(Spain) Ricardo Visus	(Spain) Real Betis		2 July 2025	
MF	(Croatia) Tonio Teklić	(Turkey) Trabzonspor	Free	22 July 2025	
DF	(Cyprus) Stelios Andreou	(Belgium) Charleroi		12 August 2025	
GK	(Serbia) Veljko Ilić	(Serbia) TSC		2 September 2025	
FW	(Senegal) Pape Meïssa Ba	(Germany) Schalke 04	Free	5 September 2025	
FW	(Switzerland) Andi Zeqiri	(Belgium) Genk		8 September 2025	
MF	(Denmark) Emil Kornvig	(Norway) Brann	€3.5 million	23 January 2026	
MF	(Ghana) Osman Bukari	(United States) Austin FC		26 January 2026	
DF	(Norway) Christopher Cheng	(Norway) Sandefjord		26 January 2026	
GK	(Poland) Bartłomiej Drągowski	(Greece) Panathinaikos		26 January 2026	
DF	(Spain) Carlos Isaac	(Spain) Córdoba		26 January 2026	
MF	(Denmark) Lukas Lerager	(Denmark) Copenhagen	Free	26 January 2026	
DF	(Poland) Przemysław Wiśniewski	(Italy) Spezia		29 January 2026	
DF	(Democratic Republic of the Congo) Steve Kapuadi	(Poland) Legia Warsaw		25 February 2026	

== Pre-season and friendlies ==
21 June 2025	Widzew Łódź	1–2	Odra Opole
12:30

28 June 2025	Widzew Łódź	2–0	Znicz Pruszków
12:00

2 July 2025	Widzew Łódź	2–0	Baník Ostrava
17:00

6 July 2025	Widzew Łódź	7–1	Jagiellonia Białystok
10:00

10 July 2025	Widzew Łódź	1–0	Piast Gliwice
11:00

10 July 2025	Widzew Łódź	0–3	Miedź Legnica
16:30

10 October 2025	Pogoń Grodzisk Mazowiecki	3–6	Widzew Łódź
12:00

12 January 2026	Widzew Łódź	1–1	Universitatea Cluj
15:00

16 January 2026	Widzew Łódź	2–1	Paks
13:00

22 January 2026	Widzew Łódź	3–2	Baník Ostrava
09:30

== Competitions ==
=== Ekstraklasa ===
Pos	Team	Pld	W	D	L	GF	GA	GD	Pts	Qualification or relegation
14	Motor Lublin	31	9	12	10	39	46	−7	39	
15	Lechia Gdańsk (Note: Lechia Gdańsk were deducted 5 points due to financial arrears.)	31	12	7	12	58	57	+1	38	
16	Widzew Łódź	31	10	6	15	36	38	−2	36	Relegation to I liga
17	Arka Gdynia	31	9	8	14	32	55	−23	35	Relegation to I liga
18	Bruk-Bet Termalica Nieciecza (R)	31	7	7	17	37	60	−23	28	Relegation to I liga

Updated to match(es) played on 8 May 2026. Source: ekstraklasa.org 90minut.pl
Rules for classification: 1) Points; 2) Head-to-head points; 3) Head-to-head goal difference; 4) Goal difference; 5) Goals scored; 6) Number of wins; 7) Number of away wins; 8) Lower number of points based on yellow and red cards (red card = 3 points, yellow card = 1 point, sending-off = 3 points - including 1 point for first yellow card); 9) Fairplay ranking; 10) Draw.
(Note: Head-to-head record is used only after all the matches between the teams in question have been played)
(R) Relegated

==== Results summary ====
Overall								Home						Away					
Pld	W	D	L	GF	GA	GD	Pts	W	D	L	GF	GA	GD	W	D	L	GF	GA	GD
32	11	6	15	39	39	0	39	8	4	4	22	15	+7	3	2	11	17	24	−7

Last updated: 9 May 2026.

==== Results by round ====
Round	1	2	3	4	5	6	7	8	9	10	11	12	13	14	15	16	17	18	19	20	21	22	23	24	25	26	27	28	29	30	31	32
Ground	H	A	H	H	A	H	A	H	A	H	A	H	A	H	A	H	A	A	H	A	A	H	A	H	A	H	A	H	A	H	A	H
Result	W	L	W	D	L	L	L	W	L	L	W	W	L	D	L	L	W	L	L	L	W	D	L	W	D	D	D	W	L	W	L	W
Position																																

Updated to match(es) played on 9 May 2026. Source:
A = Away; H = Home; W = Win; D = Draw; L = Loss

==== Matches ====
19 July 2025 1	Widzew Łódź	1–0	Zagłębie Lubin
14:45

27 July 2025 2	Jagiellonia Białystok	3–2	Widzew Łódź
17:30

2 August 2025 3	Widzew Łódź	3–0	GKS Katowice
17:30

9 August 2025 4	Widzew Łódź	1–1	Wisła Płock
20:15

15 August 2025 5	Cracovia	1–0	Widzew Łódź
20:30

22 August 2025 6	Widzew Łódź	1–2	Pogoń Szczecin
20:30

31 August 2025 7	Lech Poznań	2–1	Widzew Łódź
17:30

14 September 2025 8	Widzew Łódź	2–0	Arka Gdynia
17:30

21 September 2025 9	Górnik Zabrze	3–2	Widzew Łódź
17:30

28 September 2025 10	Widzew Łódź	0–1	Raków Częstochowa
12:15

4 October 2025 11	Bruk-Bet Termalica Nieciecza	2–4	Widzew Łódź
14:45

17 October 2025 12	Widzew Łódź	3–2	Radomiak Radom
20:30

24 October 2025 13	Motor Lublin	3–0	Widzew Łódź
20:30

2 November 2025 14	Widzew Łódź	1–1	Legia Warsaw
20:15

8 November 2025 15	Lechia Gdańsk	2–1	Widzew Łódź
14:45

23 November 2025 16	Widzew Łódź	1–3	Korona Kielce
17:30

28 November 2025 17	Piast Gliwice	0–2	Widzew Łódź
18:00

6 December 2025 18	Zagłębie Lubin	2–1	Widzew Łódź
17:30

31 January 2026 19	Widzew Łódź	1–3	Jagiellonia Białystok
17:30

8 February 2026 20	GKS Katowice	1–0	Widzew Łódź
17:30

14 February 2026 21	Wisła Płock	0–2	Widzew Łódź
20:15

20 February 2026 22	Widzew Łódź	0–0	Cracovia
20:30

28 February 2026 23	Pogoń Szczecin	1–0	Widzew Łódź
14:45

7 March 2026 24	Widzew Łódź	2–1	Lech Poznań
20:15

15 March 2026 25	Arka Gdynia	0–0	Widzew Łódź	Gdynia
12:15

22 March 2026 26	Widzew Łódź	0–0	Górnik Zabrze	Łódź
17:30				Stadium: Widzew Łódź Stadium

4 April 2026 27	Raków Częstochowa	1–1	Widzew Łódź	Częstochowa
14:45

11 April 2026 28	Widzew Łódź	1–0	Bruk-Bet Termalica Nieciecza	Łódź
14:45				Stadium: Widzew Łódź Stadium

18 April 2026 29	Radomiak Radom	2–1	Widzew Łódź	Radom
14:45				Stadium: Stadion im. Braci Czachorów

26 April 2026 30	Widzew Łódź	2–0	Motor Lublin	Łódź
14:45	Isaac 15'; Lerager 55'			Stadium: Widzew Łódź Stadium; Referee: Łukasz Kuźma

1 May 2026 31	Legia Warsaw	1–0	Widzew Łódź	Warsaw
20:30	Adamski 90+7'			Stadium: Polish Army Stadium

9 May 2026 32	Widzew Łódź	3–1	Lechia Gdańsk	Łódź
14:45				Stadium: Widzew Łódź Stadium

=== Polish Cup ===
24 September 2025 First round	Bruk-Bet Termalica Nieciecza	2–2 (4–5 p)	Widzew Łódź	Nieciecza
21:00

29 October 2025 Round of 32	Widzew Łódź	1–0 (a.e.t.)	Zagłębie Lubin	Łódź
17:30				Stadium: Widzew Łódź Stadium

2 December 2025 Round of 16	Pogoń Szczecin	0–1	Widzew Łódź	Szczecin
20:30

3 March 2026 Quarter-finals	GKS Katowice	1–1 (a.e.t.) (4–2 p)	Widzew Łódź	Katowice
20:45
