= 2026–27 Widzew Łódź season =

Widzew Łódź
2026–27 season
- Manager: Aleksandar Vuković
- Stadium: Widzew Łódź Stadium
- Ekstraklasa: Pre-season
- Polish Cup: Pre-season
Home colours	Away colours	Third colours

The 2026–27 season is the 117th season in the history of Widzew Łódź and their fifth consecutive season in the Ekstraklasa. The club will also compete in the Polish Cup.

== Transfers ==
=== In ===
Pos.	Player	Transferred from	Fee	Date	Source
FW	(Poland) Karol Świderski	(Greece) Panathinaikos		1 July 2026	
DF	(Spain) Mario García	(Spain) Racing de Santander	Undisclosed	10 July 2026	
DF	(Bosnia and Herzegovina) Jusuf Gazibegović	(Germany) 1. FC Köln	Loan	26 July 2026	

=== Out ===
Pos.	Player	Transferred to	Fee	Date	Source
DF	(Kosovo) Dion Gallapeni	(Poland) Wisła Płock	Loan made permanent	1 July 2026	
GK	(Poland) Maciej Kikolski	(Poland) GKS Katowice	Loan	1 July 2026	
DF	(Slovakia) Samuel Kozlovský	(Slovakia) Slovan Bratislava	End of contract	1 July 2026	

== Pre-season and friendlies ==
On 22 June, the pre-season friendly fixture list was announced, including five matches in an Austrian camp, which features a mini-competition with Mattersburger SV 2020 and Beşiktaş.

27 June 2026 Friendly	Widzew Łódź (Poland)	4–0	(Poland) Stal Rzeszów	Łódź
13:00	Zeqiri 28' (pen.); Bergier 74', 77' (pen.), 85' (pen.)

4 July 2026 Friendly	Widzew Łódź (Poland)	0–0	(Slovakia) DAC 1904 Dunajská Streda	Austria
17:30	Bergier (red card) 45+1'

5 July 2026 Friendly	Widzew Łódź (Poland)	v	(United States) New England Revolution	Austria
17:00

10 July 2026 Tournament	Widzew Łódź (Poland)	2–0	(Turkey) Beşiktaş	Austria
18:30	Kornvig 31'; Álvarez 46'
Note: The match consists of two 35-minute halves

10 July 2026 Tournament	Widzew Łódź (Poland)	v	(Austria) Mattersburger SV 2020	Austria
20:00
Note: The match consists of two 35-minute halves

19 July 2026 Friendly	Widzew Łódź (Poland)	2–0	(Poland) Puszcza Niepołomice
17:00	Fornalczyk 35'; Bergier 73'

== Competitions ==
=== Overall record ===
Competition	First match	Last match	Starting round	Record							
Competition	First match	Last match	Starting round	Pld	W	D	L	GF	GA	GD	Win %
Ekstraklasa	26 July 2026		Matchday 1	1	0	1	0	2	2	+0	0.00
Polish Cup				0	0	0	0	0	0	+0	—
Total				1	0	1	0	2	2	+0	0.00

Last updated: 26 July 2026
Source: Competitions

=== Ekstraklasa ===
Pos	Team	Pld	W	D	L	GF	GA	GD	Pts
7	Wisła Kraków	2	1	0	1	5	5	0	3
8	Piast Gliwice	2	1	0	1	4	5	−1	3
9	Widzew Łódź	2	0	2	0	2	2	0	2
10	Cracovia	1	0	1	0	0	0	0	1
10	Lech Poznań	1	0	1	0	0	0	0	1

Updated to match(es) played on 27 July 2026. Source: ekstraklasa.org 90minut.pl
Rules for classification: 1) Points; 2) Head-to-head points; 3) Head-to-head goal difference; 4) Goal difference; 5) Goals scored; 6) Number of wins; 7) Number of away wins; 8) Lower number of points based on yellow and red cards (red card = 3 points, yellow card = 1 point, sending-off = 3 points - including 1 point for first yellow card); 9) Fairplay ranking; 10) Draw.
(Note: Head-to-head record is used only after all the matches between the teams in question have been played)

==== Matches ====
26 July 2026 1	Widzew Łódź	2–2	Motor Lublin	Łódź
17:30	Fornalczyk 20'; Bergier 28' (pen.)		Bergier 13' (o.g.); Ndiaye 49'
