= Kamil Piątkowski =

Polish footballer

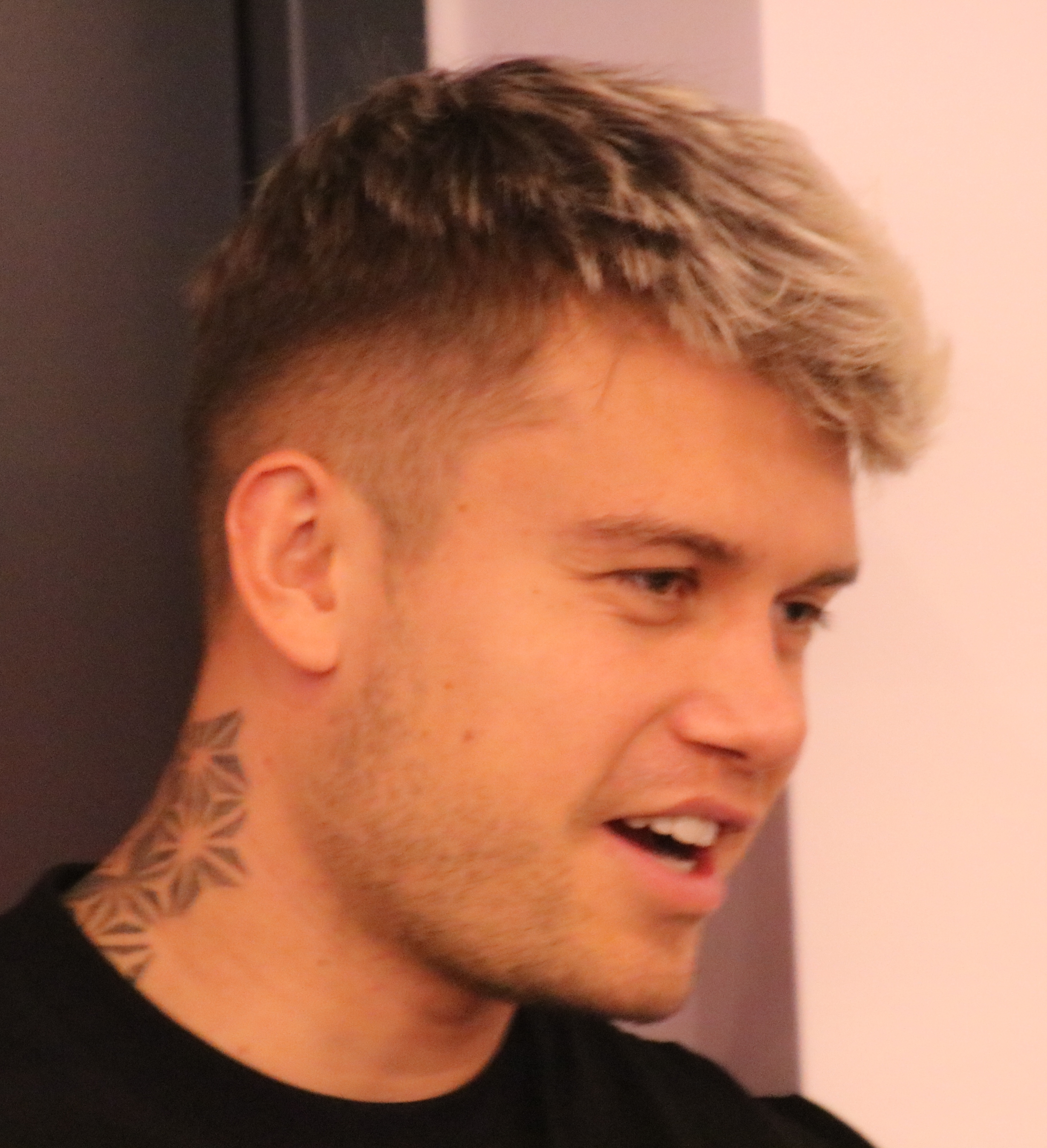
- Piątkowski with Red Bull Salzburg in 2024

Personal information
- Full name: Kamil Dawid Piątkowski
- Date of birth: 21 June 2000 (age 26)
- Place of birth: Jasło, Poland
- Height: 1.91 m (6 ft 3 in)
- Position: Defender

Team information
- Current team: Legia Warsaw
- Number: 91

Youth career
- UKS 6 Jasło
- 2014–2016: Karpaty Krosno
- 2016–2017: Zagłębie Lubin

Senior career*
| Years | Team | Apps | (Gls) |
| 2017–2019 | Zagłębie Lubin II | 23 | (0) |
| 2019–2021 | Raków Częstochowa | 51 | (3) |
| 2021–2025 | Red Bull Salzburg | 37 | (1) |
| 2023 | → Gent (loan) | 17 | (0) |
| 2024 | → Granada (loan) | 9 | (0) |
| 2025 | → Kasımpaşa (loan) | 13 | (0) |
| 2025– | Legia Warsaw | 39 | (0) |

International career^{‡}
| 2014 | Poland U15 | 2 | (0) |
| 2018–2019 | Poland U19 | 2 | (0) |
| 2019 | Poland U20 | 2 | (0) |
| 2020–2022 | Poland U21 | 7 | (0) |
| 2021– | Poland | 8 | (1) |
- * Club domestic league appearances and goals as of 12:37, 10 November 2026 (UTC) ‡ National team caps and goals as of 22:50, 24 March 2025 (UTC)

Kamil Dawid Piątkowski (born 21 June 2000) is a Polish professional footballer who plays as a defender for Ekstraklasa club Legia Warsaw and the Poland national team.

== Early and personal life ==
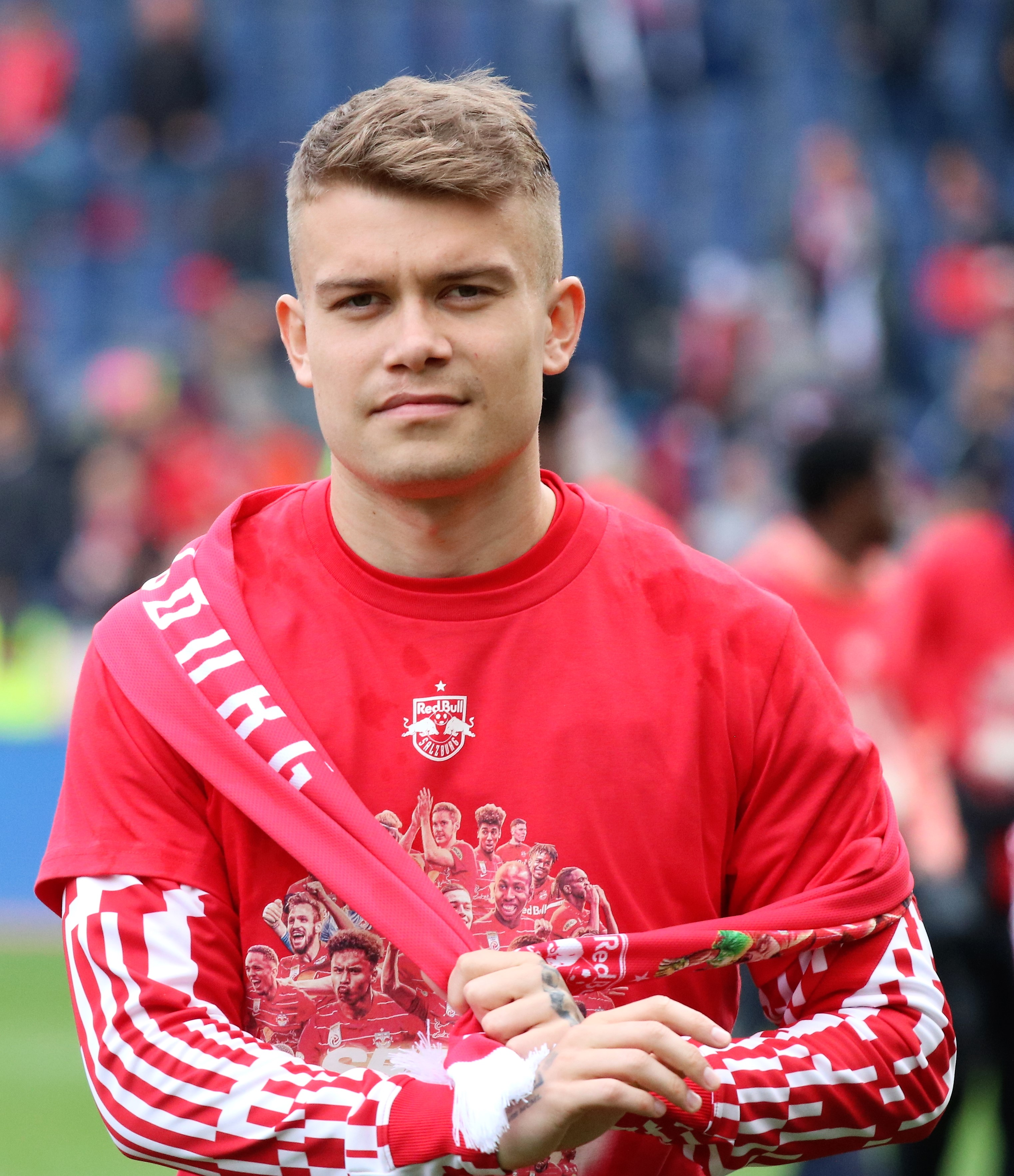
Piątkowski in 2022 with Red Bull Salzburg

Born in Jaslo as the oldest of two children, Piątkowski moved to Zagłębie Lubin when he was attending high school. Piątkowski is in relationship with his partner, Katarzyna Noga.

== Club career ==
Piątkowski moved to Austria in 2021, signing for Red Bull Salzburg. During the 2024–25 UEFA Champions League play-off round on 21 August 2024, he scored a header for Red Bull Salzburg in a 2–0 victory against Dynamo Kyiv.

He joined Spanish La Liga club Granada CF on a six-month loan in January 2024. Piątkowski returned to Red Bull Salzburg at the end of the season. On 31 January 2025, he moved to Turkish club Kasımpaşa on loan for the remainder of the season.

On 30 August 2025, Piątkowski joined Ekstraklasa club Legia Warsaw on a four-year deal.

== International career ==
On 28 March 2021, Piątkowski debuted for the Polish senior squad in a World Cup qualification against Andorra.

He scored his first international goal for Poland on 18 November 2024, in a UEFA Nations League match against Scotland. The goal came just after the hour mark, when Piotr Zieliński set him up for a powerful strike from outside the box that found the top corner of the net, leveling the score at 1–1. Despite Piątkowski's goal, Poland ultimately lost 2–1 after a last-minute goal from Andy Robertson, which led to Poland's relegation from League A for the first time in the competition's history.

== Career statistics ==
=== Club ===
As of match played 8 November 2026

Appearances and goals by club, season and competition
| Club | Season | League | | | National cup (Note: Includes Polish Cup, Austrian Cup) | | Europe | | Other | | Total | |
| Club | Season | Division | Apps | Goals | Apps | Goals | Apps | Goals | Apps | Goals | Apps | Goals |
|---|---|---|---|---|---|---|---|---|---|---|---|---|
| Zagłębie Lubin II | 2016–17 | IV liga Low. Sil. | 1 | 0 | — | | — | | — | | 1 | 0 |
| Zagłębie Lubin II | 2017–18 | III liga, gr. III | 2 | 0 | 0 | 0 | — | | — | | 2 | 0 |
| Zagłębie Lubin II | 2018–19 | III liga, gr. III | 20 | 0 | — | | — | | — | | 20 | 0 |
| Zagłębie Lubin II | Total | | 23 | 0 | 0 | 0 | — | | — | | 23 | 0 |
| Raków Częstochowa | 2019–20 | Ekstraklasa | 24 | 1 | 2 | 0 | — | | — | | 26 | 1 |
| Raków Częstochowa | 2020–21 | Ekstraklasa | 27 | 2 | 6 | 1 | — | | — | | 33 | 3 |
| Raków Częstochowa | Total | | 51 | 3 | 8 | 1 | — | | — | | 59 | 4 |
| Red Bull Salzburg | 2021–22 | Austrian Bundesliga | 13 | 0 | 1 | 0 | 2 (Note: Appearances in UEFA Champions League) | 0 | — | | 16 | 0 |
| Red Bull Salzburg | 2022–23 | Austrian Bundesliga | 3 | 0 | 1 | 0 | 0 | 0 | — | | 4 | 0 |
| Red Bull Salzburg | 2023–24 | Austrian Bundesliga | 7 | 1 | 0 | 0 | 3 | 0 | — | | 10 | 1 |
| Red Bull Salzburg | 2024–25 | Austrian Bundesliga | 14 | 0 | 3 | 0 | 10 | 0 | 0 | 0 | 27 | 0 |
| Red Bull Salzburg | Total | | 37 | 1 | 5 | 0 | 15 | 0 | 0 | 0 | 57 | 1 |
| Gent (loan) | 2022–23 | Belgian First Division A | 17 | 0 | 0 | 0 | 5 (Note: Appearances in UEFA Conference League) | 0 | — | | 22 | 0 |
| Granada (loan) | 2023–24 | La Liga | 9 | 0 | — | | — | | — | | 9 | 0 |
| Kasımpaşa (loan) | 2024–25 | Süper Lig | 13 | 0 | 0 | 0 | — | | — | | 13 | 0 |
| Legia Warsaw | 2025–26 | Ekstraklasa | 26 | 0 | 1 | 1 | 4 | 0 | — | | 31 | 1 |
| Legia Warsaw | 2026–27 | Ekstraklasa | 13 | 0 | 1 | 0 | — | | — | | 14 | 0 |
| Legia Warsaw | Total | | 39 | 0 | 2 | 1 | 4 | 0 | — | | 45 | 1 |
| Career total | | | 189 | 4 | 15 | 2 | 24 | 0 | 0 | 0 | 228 | 6 |

=== International ===
As of match played 24 March 2025

Appearances and goals by national team and year
| National team | Year | Apps | Goals |
|---|---|---|---|
Poland
| Poland | 2021 | 3 | 0 |
| Poland | 2022 | 0 | 0 |
| Poland | 2023 | 0 | 0 |
| Poland | 2024 | 3 | 1 |
| Poland | 2025 | 2 | 0 |
| Total | | 8 | 1 |

Scores and results list Poland goal tally first, score column indicates score after each Piątkowski goal

List of international goals scored by Kamil Piątkowski
| No. | Date | Venue | Opponent | Score | Result | Competition |
|---|---|---|---|---|---|---|
| 1 | 18 November 2024 | Kazimierz Górski National Stadium, Warsaw, Poland | Scotland | 1–1 | 1–2 | 2024–25 UEFA Nations League A |

== Honours ==
Zagłębie Lubin II

- IV liga Lower Silesia West: 2016–17
- Polish Cup (Legnica regionals): 2018–19

Raków Częstochowa

- Polish Cup: 2020–21

Red Bull Salzburg

- Austrian Bundesliga: 2021–22
- Austrian Cup: 2021–22

Individual

- Ekstraklasa Young Player of the Season: 2020–21
- Ekstraklasa Young Player of the Month: March 2021, April 2021
