= Jesús Jiménez (footballer) =

Spanish footballer

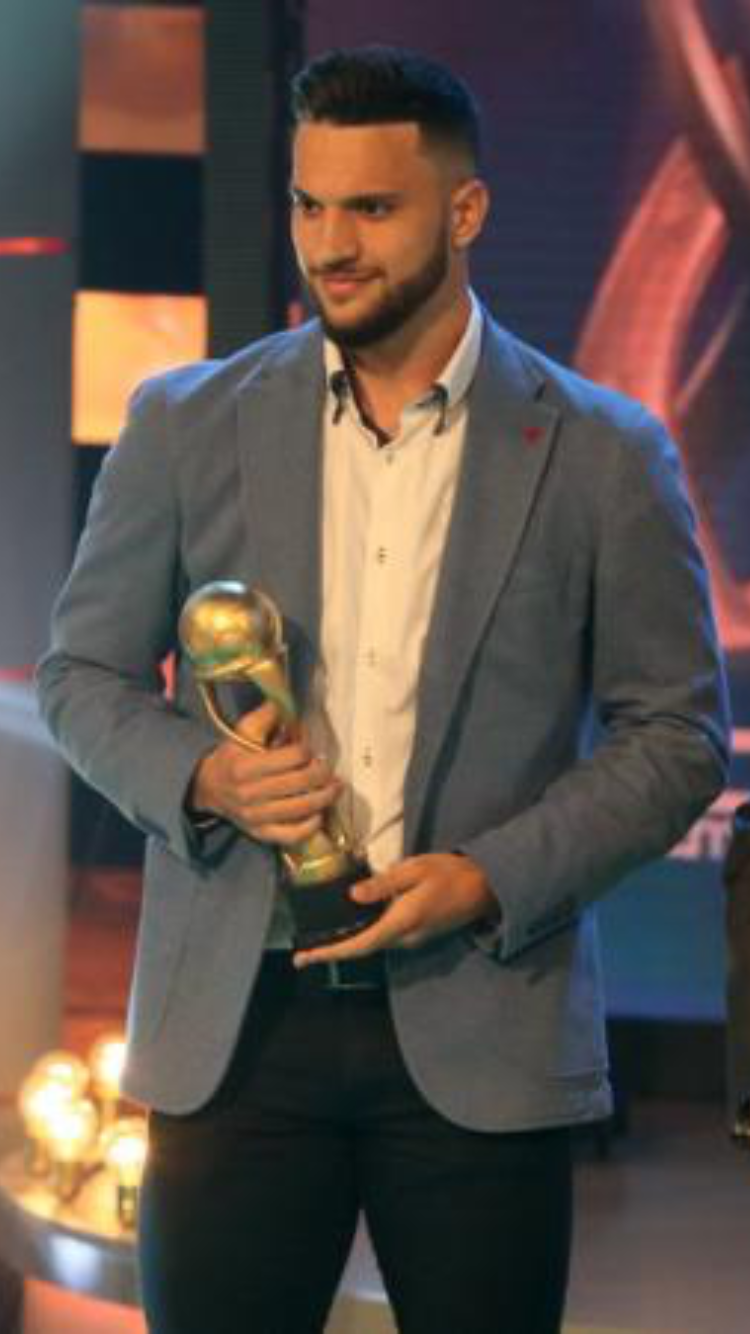
- Jiménez in 2018

Personal information
- Full name: Jesús Jiménez Núñez
- Date of birth: 5 November 1993 (age 33)
- Place of birth: Leganés, Spain
- Height: 1.83 m (6 ft 0 in)
- Position: Striker

Team information
- Current team: Bruk-Bet Termalica Nieciecza
- Number: 9

Youth career
- Lugo de Fuenlabrada
- Atlético Madrid
- 2011–2012: Leganés

Senior career*
Years	Team	Apps	(Gls)
2012–2013	Leganés B		
2013–2014	Unión Adarve	27	(5)
2014–2015	Alcorcón B	13	(1)
2015	Atlético Pinto	16	(2)
2015–2016	Illescas	36	(15)
2016–2018	Talavera	68	(36)
2018–2022	Górnik Zabrze	121	(37)
2022	Toronto FC	33	(10)
2023	FC Dallas	22	(0)
2024	OFI	6	(1)
2024–2025	Kerala Blasters	18	(11)
2025–	Bruk-Bet Termalica Nieciecza	31	(5)
- * Club domestic league appearances and goals as of 21:45, 25 May 2026 (UTC)

Jesús Jiménez Núñez (born 5 November 1993) is a Spanish professional footballer who plays as a striker for Polish I liga club Bruk-Bet Termalica Nieciecza.

== Early life ==
Jiménez began playing youth football with Lugo de Fuenlabrada, later attending the Atlético Madrid youth school. At age 16 or 17, he joined the academy of CD Leganés.

== Club career ==
After having spent two seasons with CD Leganés B, he went on to represent AD Unión Adarve, AD Alcorcón B, Atlético Pinto in Tercera División.

On 18 July 2015, Jiménez joined newly promoted club CD Illescas. He scored 15 goals in 36 matches that season.

In the summer of 2016, he moved to CF Talavera de la Reina. On 27 November, he scored four goals in a 5–0 victory against his former club Illescas. He scored 26 league goals in his first season with his club winning promotion to Segunda División B. On 6 September 2017, he scored twice in a 3–1 Copa del Rey victory against Antequera CF.

On 1 June 2018, Jiménez moved abroad and joined Polish club Górnik Zabrze on a three-year contract. On 12 July, he made his first team debut, starting in a 1–0 win against Moldovan club Zaria Bălți in the UEFA Europa League qualifiers. In his second season, he scored 12 goals and compatriot teammate Igor Angulo scored 16. He recorded the same figures in 2020–21, including a hat-trick on the opening day in a 4–2 home win over Podbeskidzie Bielsko-Biała.

On 7 February 2022, Jiménez signed with Major League Soccer club Toronto FC on an initial two-and-a-half-year deal. He made his debut on 26 February in the season opener against FC Dallas. He scored his first goal in the next match on 5 March, in a 4–1 loss against the New York Red Bulls.

In February 2023, ahead of the 2023 MLS season, he was traded to FC Dallas in exchange for Brandon Servania. After dealing with visa issues, he made his debut for the club on 18 March 2023, in a match against Sporting Kansas City. After the season, he agreed to mutually terminate the remainder of his contract.

In February 2024, he signed with Super League Greece club OFI. In late August 2024, he agreed to mutually terminate his contract with the Greek club.

On 30 August 2024, following heavy media speculation, Jiménez left OFI and joined the Indian Super League club Kerala Blasters FC on a two-year deal until 2026. He debuted for the Blasters on 15 September 2024 in a 2–1 loss against Punjab, in a substitute appearance, also scoring his first goal for the club in the match. After scoring in a 3–0 win against Chennaiyin on 24 November 2025, he became the first player in Kerala Blasters' history to score in six consecutive matches.

In July 2025, he signed with Polish Ekstraklasa club Bruk-Bet Termalica Nieciecza through June 2027.

== Career statistics ==
As of match played 23 May 2026

Appearances and goals by club, season and competition
Club	Season	League			National cup (Note: Includes Copa del Rey, Polish Cup, U.S. Open Cup, Super Cup)		Continental		Other		Total	
Club	Season	Division	Apps	Goals	Apps	Goals	Apps	Goals	Apps	Goals	Apps	Goals
Alcorcón B	2014–15	Tercera División	13	1	—		—		—		13	1
Atlético Pinto	2014–15	Tercera División	16	2	—		—		—		16	2
Illescas	2015–16	Tercera División	36	15	—		—		—		36	15
Talavera	2016–17	Tercera División	33	26	—		—		2 (Note: Appearances in Tercera División play-offs)	1	35	27
Talavera	2017–18	Segunda División B	35	10	2	2	—		—		37	12
Talavera	Total		68	36	2	2	—		2	1	72	39
Górnik Zabrze	2018–19	Ekstraklasa	36	5	4	2	4 (Note: Appearances in UEFA Europa League)	0	—		44	7
Górnik Zabrze	2019–20	Ekstraklasa	37	12	1	0	—		—		38	12
Górnik Zabrze	2020–21	Ekstraklasa	29	12	2	3	—		—		31	15
Górnik Zabrze	2021–22	Ekstraklasa	19	8	2	1	—		—		21	9
Górnik Zabrze	Total		121	37	9	6	4	0	—		134	43
Toronto FC	2022	Major League Soccer	33	9	3	1	—		1 (Note: Appearance in 2020 Canadian Championship final)	0	37	10
FC Dallas	2023	Major League Soccer	23	0	0	0	—		1 (Note: Appearance in the MLS Playoffs)	0	24	0
OFI	2023–24	Super League Greece	4	1	—		—		—		4	1
OFI	2024–25	Super League Greece	2	0	—		—		—		2	0
OFI	Total		6	1	—		—		—		6	1
Kerala Blasters	2024–25	Indian Super League	18	11	2	1	—		0	0	20	12
Bruk-Bet Termalica	2025–26	Ekstraklasa	31	5	1	0	—		—		32	5
Career total			365	117	17	10	4	0	4	1	390	128

== Honours ==
Toronto

- Canadian Championship: 2020

Individual

- Ekstraklasa Player of the Month: August 2020
