= Robert Deziel Jr. =

American soccer player (born 2005)

Personal information
- Full name: Robert Edward Deziel Jr.
- Date of birth: June 30, 2005 (age 21)
- Place of birth: Palm Beach, Florida, United States
- Height: 1.86 m (6 ft 1 in)
- Positions: Center-back; defensive midfielder

Team information
- Current team: Legia Warsaw
- Number: 5

Youth career
- 2015–2017: Real Madrid
- 2017–2018: Unión Adarve
- 2018–2020: Celta Vigo
- 2020–2023: Bayern Munich

Senior career*
Years	Team	Apps	(Gls)
2023–2026	Bayern Munich II	28	(4)
2023–2025	→ VSG Altglienicke (loan)	33	(1)
2023	→ VSG Altglienicke II (loan)	3	(0)
2026–	Legia Warsaw	13	(0)

International career^{‡}
2019	United States U15	1	(1)
2026–	United States U23	2	(0)
- * Club domestic league appearances and goals as of November 9, 2026 ‡ National team caps and goals as of November 17, 2026

Robert Edward Deziel Jr. (born June 30, 2005) is an American professional soccer player who plays as a center-back and defensive midfielder for Ekstraklasa club Legia Warsaw.

== Club career ==
=== Youth career ===
Deziel was born in Palm Beach, Florida, United States. He moved to Spain in 2014 at nine years old, and soon thereafter joined the youth academy of La Liga giants Real Madrid. He then moved to fellow Spanish club Unión Adarve in 2017. In early 2018, Deziel moved to the youth academy of fellow La Liga club Celta Vigo, where he continued his development until 2020.

=== Bayern Munich ===
In 2020 he moved to Germany and joined the youth academy of Bundesliga giants Bayern Munich. Deziel was named by the Bundesliga website as one of the top five Bayern's youngster to watch ahead of the 2023–24 season.

After his loan return, he made his debut with Bayern Munich II in the Regionalliga Bayern during the 2025–26 season.

==== Loan to VSG Altglienicke ====
Deziel moved to the Regionalliga Nordost club VSG Altglienicke on loan for the 2023–24 season, with whom he also played through the 2024–25 season.

=== Legia Warsaw ===
On July 18, 2026, Deziel moved to Poland and signed a four-year contract with Ekstraklasa club Legia Warsaw as a free agent, ahead of the 2026–27 season.

== International career ==
He was called up with the United States under-15s in 2019, scoring a goal during his debut. Deziel was called up for the under-19s in 2022. He was one of the 23 players called up for the under-23s by head coach Steve Cherundolo on November 2026, ahead of the team's first camp of the 2028 Summer Olympics cycle, for the matches against Scotland and Ukraine, to be held from November 15 and 17 respectively, in San Pedro del Pinatar, Spain.

== Style of play ==
Deziel primarily plays as a centre-back, but has also been deployed as a defensive midfielder. His style of play has been characterized by his passing ability, positional awareness, and defensive contributions. He has also been noted for his physical attributes and has scored goals from set-piece situations.

== Career statistics ==
As of match played November 8, 2026

Appearances and goals by club, season and competition
Club	Season	League			National cup (Note: Includes Polish Cup)		Other		Total	
Club	Season	Division	Apps	Goals	Apps	Goals	Apps	Goals	Apps	Goals
VSG Altglienicke (loan)	2023–24	Regionalliga Nordost	6	1	—		6 (Note: Appearances in Berlin Cup)	1	12	2
VSG Altglienicke (loan)	2024–25	Regionalliga Nordost	27	0	—		—		27	0
VSG Altglienicke (loan)	Total		33	1	—		6	0	39	2
VSG Altglienicke II (loan)	2023–24	Berlin-Liga	3	0	—		—		3	0
Bayern Munich II	2025–26	Regionalliga Bayern	28	4	—		—		28	4
Legia Warsaw	2026–27	Ekstraklasa	13	0	1	0	—		14	0
Career total			77	5	7	1	0	0	84	6
