= Bartłomiej Drągowski =

Polish footballer (born 1997)

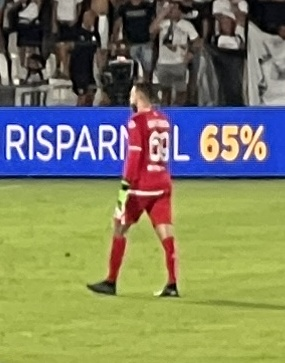
- Drągowski playing for Spezia in 2022

Personal information
- Date of birth: 19 August 1997 (age 29)
- Place of birth: Białystok, Poland
- Height: 1.91 m (6 ft 3 in)
- Position: Goalkeeper

Team information
- Current team: Widzew Łódź
- Number: 1

Youth career
- 2010–2012: MOSP Jagiellonia Białystok
- 2012–2013: Jagiellonia Białystok

Senior career*
Years	Team	Apps	(Gls)
2013–2014	Jagiellonia Białystok II	16	(0)
2014–2016	Jagiellonia Białystok	64	(0)
2016–2022	Fiorentina	81	(0)
2019	→ Empoli (loan)	14	(0)
2022–2024	Spezia	48	(0)
2024	→ Panathinaikos (loan)	12	(0)
2024–2026	Panathinaikos	35	(0)
2026–	Widzew Łódź	29	(0)

International career^{‡}
2011	Poland U15	1	(0)
2012–2013	Poland U16	6	(0)
2013–2014	Poland U17	8	(0)
2014–2016	Poland U19	10	(0)
2015–2017	Poland U20	5	(0)
2015–2019	Poland U21	6	(0)
2020–	Poland	5	(0)
- * Club domestic league appearances and goals as of 13:14, 10 November 2026 (UTC) ‡ National team caps and goals as of 23:41, 14 November 2026 (UTC)

Bartłomiej Drągowski (Polish pronunciation: [barˈtwɔmjɛj drɔŋˈɡɔfskʲi]; born 19 August 1997) is a Polish professional footballer who plays as a goalkeeper for Ekstraklasa club Widzew Łódź and the Poland national team. He began his career with Polish side Jagiellonia Białystok where he made over 60 appearances before joining Fiorentina in 2016.

== Early and personal life ==
Dragowski was born on 19 August 1997 in Białystok, Poland. He is in relationship with Agnieszka Abram. His father Dariusz Drągowski was also a professional footballer.

== Club career ==
=== Jagiellonia Białystok ===
An academy graduate of the former club himself, Drągowski made his Ekstraklasa debut at the age of 16 in a 4–4 draw with Korona Kielce on 27 May 2014. Following his performance during the match, he was named the division's Best Goalkeeper, Discovery of the Season and voted third-best player overall. He ultimately made 69 appearances for the club across all competitions, including in which were appearances in the league, Polish Cup and UEFA Europa League.

=== Fiorentina ===
On 4 July 2016, he signed a five-year contract with Serie A side Fiorentina. His debut and only league appearance for the season, came on the final day of the campaign, when he started in a 2–2 draw with Pescara.

==== Loan to Empoli ====
On 22 January 2019, Drągowski joined to Empoli on loan until 30 June 2019. He made the headlines after keeping a clean sheet and having made 17 saves in the Serie A match against Atalanta on 15 April, a new league record. In total, he faced 47 shots, of which 18 were on target.

=== Spezia and loan to Panathinaikos ===
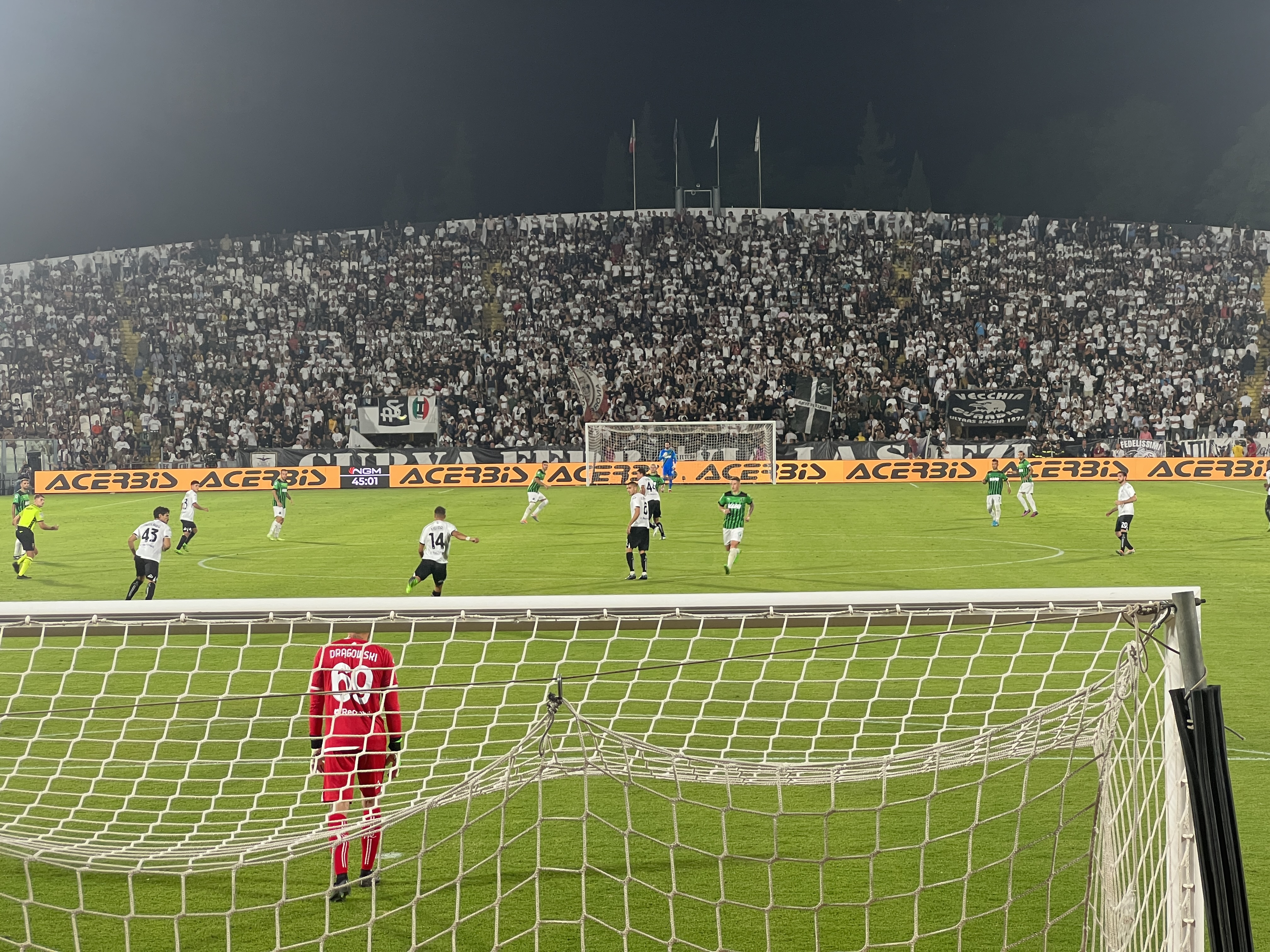
Drągowski (goalkeeper in red, number 69) with Spezia during a match

On 10 August 2022, Drągowski joined Serie A club Spezia on a three-year contract. On 19 January 2024, Drągowski went on loan to Greek side Panathinaikos until the end of the season, with an option to buy.

=== Widzew Łódź ===
On 12 January 2026, it was announced that Drągowski would return to Poland as a new Widzew Łódź player, signing a contract until June 2029.

== International career ==
In June 2017, Drągowski was one of 23 players named in the U21 squad by Marcin Dorna for the 2017 UEFA European Under-21 Championship, where Poland were the hosts.

In October 2020, Drągowski received his call-up to the Polish senior squad for 2020–21 UEFA Nations League along with three friendly matches against Finland, Netherlands, and Bosnia and Herzegovina. He debuted against the first opponent the same year on 7 October.

Drągowski was named in the final Polish 26-man squad for the 2022 FIFA World Cup, but missed the tournament due to an injury and was replaced by Kamil Grabara.

== Career statistics ==
=== Club ===
As of match played 7 November 2026

Appearances and goals by club, season and competition
Club	Season	League			National cup (Note: Includes Polish Cup, Coppa Italia, Greek Football Cup)		Continental		Other		Total	
Club	Season	Division	Apps	Goals	Apps	Goals	Apps	Goals	Apps	Goals	Apps	Goals
Jagiellonia Białystok II	2013–14	III liga, group B	14	0	—		—		—		14	0
Jagiellonia Białystok II	2014–15	III liga, group B	2	0	—		—		—		2	0
Jagiellonia Białystok II	Total		16	0	—		—		—		16	0
Jagiellonia Białystok	2013–14	Ekstraklasa	1	0	—		—		—		1	0
Jagiellonia Białystok	2014–15	Ekstraklasa	29	0	1	0	—		—		30	0
Jagiellonia Białystok	2015–16	Ekstraklasa	34	0	0	0	4 (Note: Appearances in UEFA Europa League)	0	—		38	0
Jagiellonia Białystok	Total		64	0	1	0	4	0	—		69	0
Fiorentina	2016–17	Serie A	1	0	0	0	0	0	—		1	0
Fiorentina	2017–18	Serie A	3	0	2	0	—		—		5	0
Fiorentina	2018–19	Serie A	3	0	0	0	—		—		3	0
Fiorentina	2019–20	Serie A	31	0	1	0	—		—		32	0
Fiorentina	2020–21	Serie A	36	0	0	0	—		—		36	0
Fiorentina	2021–22	Serie A	7	0	2	0	—		—		9	0
Fiorentina	Total		81	0	5	0	0	0	—		86	0
Empoli (loan)	2018–19	Serie A	14	0	0	0	—		—		14	0
Spezia	2022–23	Serie A	35	0	0	0	—		1 (Note: Appearance in Serie A relegation play-off)	0	36	0
Spezia	2023–24	Serie B	13	0	1	0	—		—		14	0
Spezia	Total		48	0	1	0	—		1	0	50	0
Panathinaikos (loan)	2023–24	Super League Greece	12	0	4	0	—		—		16	0
Panathinaikos	2024–25	Super League Greece	29	0	0	0	13 (Note: Four appearances in UEFA Europa League, nine appearances in UEFA Conference League)	0	—		42	0
Panathinaikos	2025–26	Super League Greece	6	0	0	0	8 (Note: Two appearances in UEFA Champions League, six appearances in UEFA Europa League)	0	—		14	0
Panathinaikos	Total		47	0	4	0	21	0	0	0	72	0
Widzew Łódź	2025–26	Ekstraklasa	15	0	1	0	—		—		16	0
Widzew Łódź	2026–27	Ekstraklasa	14	0	0	0	—		—		14	0
Widzew Łódź	Total		29	0	1	0	—		—		30	0
Career total			299	0	12	0	25	0	1	0	337	0

=== International ===
As of match played 14 November 2026

Appearances and goals by national team and year
National team	Year	Apps	Goals
Poland	2020	1	0
Poland	2022	1	0
Poland	2025	2	0
Poland	2026	1	0
Total		5	0

== Honours ==
Panathinaikos

- Greek Cup: 2023–24

Individual

- Ekstraklasa Goalkeeper of the Season: 2014–15
- Ekstraklasa Discovery of the Season: 2014–15
