= Michał Rosiak =

Polish footballer (born 2005)

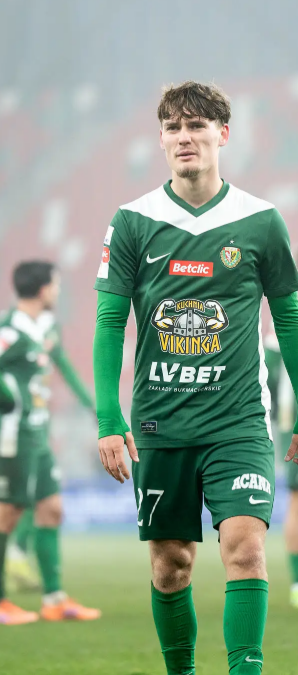
- Rosiak with Śląsk Wrocław in 2025

Personal information
- Date of birth: 12 October 2005 (age 21)
- Place of birth: Białogard, Poland
- Height: 1.80 m (5 ft 11 in)
- Positions: Defender; midfielder

Team information
- Current team: Twente
- Number: 2

Youth career
- Głaz Tychowo
- –2016: Kotwica Kołobrzeg
- 2016–2025: Arsenal

Senior career*
Years	Team	Apps	(Gls)
2025	Arsenal	0	(0)
2025–2026	Śląsk Wrocław	28	(4)
2025	Śląsk Wrocław II	1	(0)
2026–	Twente	1	(0)

International career^{‡}
2019	Poland U15	2	(0)
2023	Poland U18	2	(0)
2023	Poland U19	5	(0)
2025	Poland U20	1	(0)
- * Club domestic league appearances and goals as of 22:00, 25 October 2026 (UTC) ‡ National team caps and goals as of 11:15, 15 November 2025 (UTC)

Michał Rosiak (born 12 October 2005) is a Polish professional footballer who plays as a defender or midfielder for Eredivisie club Twente.

== Early life ==
Rosiak was born on 12 October 2005 in Białogard, Poland. Moving with his family to London, England at a young age, he is the son of Polish footballer Mariusz Rosiak.

== Club career ==
As a youth player, Rosiak joined the youth academy of Polish side Kotwica Kołobrzeg. Subsequently, he joined the youth academy of English Premier League side Arsenal. Polish newspaper wrote in 2025 that he was "a key figure in the [club's] Premier League 2 side".

On 3 September 2025, Rosiak joined Polish I liga club Śląsk Wrocław on a deal until the end of the season, with a one-year extension option.

On 2 September 2026, Rosiak moved to Eredivisie club FC Twente on a four-year contract, for a reported fee of €1 million. He made his debut on 25 October, coming onto the pitch in the 72nd minute of a 2–0 league win against AZ.

== International career ==
Rosiak is a Poland youth international. During October 2023, he played for the Poland under-19s during the 2024 UEFA European Under-19 Championship qualification.

== Style of play ==
Rosiak plays as a defender or as a midfielder and is right-footed. Known for his versatility, he is also known for his free kick taking ability and his goalscoring ability.

== Career statistics ==
As of match played 25 October 2026

Appearances and goals by club, season and competition
Club	Season	League			Cup		Europe		Other		Total	
Club	Season	Division	Apps	Goals	Apps	Goals	Apps	Goals	Apps	Goal	Apps	Goal
Arsenal U21	2023–24	—			—		—		1 (Note: Appearances in EFL Trophy)	0	1	0
Arsenal U21	2024–25	—			—		—		3	0	3	0
Arsenal U21	Total		—		—		—		4	0	4	0
Arsenal	2024–25	Premier League	0	0	0	0	0	0	0	0	0	0
Śląsk Wrocław	2025–26	I liga	22	4	2	0	—		—		24	4
Śląsk Wrocław	2026–27	Ekstraklasa	6	0	0	0	—		—		6	0
Śląsk Wrocław	Total		28	4	2	0	—		—		30	4
Śląsk Wrocław II	2025–26	II liga	1	0	—		—		—		1	0
Twente	2026–27	Eredivisie	1	0	0	0	0	0	—		1	0
Career total			30	4	2	0	0	0	4	0	36	4
