= Przemysław Wiśniewski =

Polish footballer

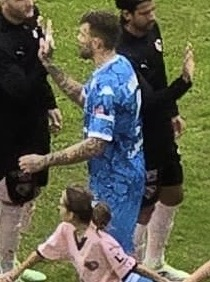
- Wiśniewski in 2024 with Spezia

Personal information
- Date of birth: 27 July 1998 (age 28)
- Place of birth: Zabrze, Poland
- Height: 1.95 m (6 ft 5 in)
- Position: Centre-back

Team information
- Current team: Widzew Łódź
- Number: 25

Youth career
- –2014: Stadion Śląski Chorzów
- 2015–2016: Górnik Zabrze

Senior career*
Years	Team	Apps	(Gls)
2016–2019	Górnik Zabrze II	34	(3)
2018–2022	Górnik Zabrze	122	(2)
2022–2023	Venezia	19	(0)
2023–2026	Spezia	66	(3)
2026–	Widzew Łódź	29	(1)

International career^{‡}
2019	Poland U20	1	(0)
2019	Poland U21	2	(0)
2025–	Poland	9	(1)
- * Club domestic league appearances and goals as of 13:25, 8 November 2026 (UTC) ‡ National team caps and goals as of 22:10, 28 September 2026 (UTC)

Przemysław Wiśniewski (born 27 July 1998) is a Polish professional footballer who plays as a centre-back for Ekstraklasa club Widzew Łódź and the Poland national team.

== Club career ==
Wiśniewski comes from the Górnik Zabrze youth ranks.

On 27 May 2022, Wiśniewski signed a contract with Serie B club Venezia in Italy for three seasons with an option for a fourth.

On 26 January 2023, Wiśniewski moved to Spezia in Serie A on a four-and-a-half-year contract.

On 29 January 2026, Wiśniewski returned to Poland and signed with Widzew Łódź until 2030.

== International career ==
Wiśniewski was called up for the senior Polish senior squad for matches against Germany and against Moldova (UEFA Euro 2024 qualifying, respectively on 16 and 20 June 2023.

On 4 September 2025, Wiśniewski debuted for Poland as a starter in a 2026 FIFA World Cup qualification match against the Netherlands, which ended in a 1–1 draw.

He scored his first international goal on 3 June 2026, in a friendly against Nigeria scoring from around 40 meters away in the last kick of the game, equalizing for 2–2.

== Personal life ==
He is the son of former footballer Jacek Wiśniewski, who also played as a centre-back.

== Career statistics ==
=== Club ===
As of match played 18 September 2026

Appearances and goals by club, season and competition
Club	Season	League			National cup (Note: Includes Polish Cup, Coppa Italia)		Continental		Other		Total	
Club	Season	Division	Apps	Goals	Apps	Goals	Apps	Goals	Apps	Goals	Apps	Goals
Górnik Zabrze II	2016–17	III liga, gr. III	13	2	—		—		—		13	2
Górnik Zabrze II	2017–18	III liga, gr. III	17	0	—		—		—		17	0
Górnik Zabrze II	2018–19	III liga, gr. III	4	1	—		—		—		4	1
Górnik Zabrze II	Total		34	3	—		—		—		34	3
Górnik Zabrze	2018–19	Ekstraklasa	25	0	2	0	4 (Note: Appearances in UEFA Europa League)	0	—		31	0
Górnik Zabrze	2019–20	Ekstraklasa	35	1	2	1	—		—		37	2
Górnik Zabrze	2020–21	Ekstraklasa	29	1	3	1	—		—		32	2
Górnik Zabrze	2021–22	Ekstraklasa	33	0	3	0	—		—		36	0
Górnik Zabrze	Total		122	2	10	2	4	0	0	0	136	4
Venezia	2022–23	Serie B	19	0	1	0	—		—		20	0
Spezia	2022–23	Serie A	14	1	—		—		1 (Note: Appearance in Serie A relegation play-off)	0	15	1
Spezia	2023–24	Serie B	1	0	0	0	—		—		1	0
Spezia	2024–25	Serie B	32	2	1	0	—		4 (Note: Appearances in Serie B promotion play-offs)	1	37	3
Spezia	2025–26	Serie B	19	0	1	0	—		—		20	0
Spezia	Total		66	3	2	0	—		5	1	73	4
Widzew Łódź	2025–26	Ekstraklasa	16	0	1	0	—		—		17	0
Widzew Łódź	2026–27	Ekstraklasa	8	0	1	0	—		—		9	0
Widzew Łódź	Total		24	0	2	0	—		—		26	0
Career total			265	8	15	2	4	0	5	1	289	11

=== International ===
As of match played 28 September 2026

Appearances and goals by national team and year
National team	Year	Apps	Goals
Poland
Poland	2025	5	0
Poland	2026	4	1
Total		9	1

Scores and results list Poland's goal tally first, score column indicates score after each Wiśniewski goal.

List of international goals scored by Przemysław Wiśniewski
No.	Date	Venue	Cap	Opponent	Score	Result	Competition
1	3 June 2026	Stadion Narodowy, Warsaw, Poland	8	Nigeria	2–2	2–2	Friendly
