= Adrian Gryszkiewicz =

Polish association football player

Personal information
- Full name: Adrian Gryszkiewicz
- Date of birth: 13 December 1999 (age 26)
- Place of birth: Bytom, Poland
- Height: 1.85 m (6 ft 1 in)
- Position: Defender

Team information
- Current team: Zagłębie Sosnowiec
- Number: 37

Youth career
- –2018: Gwarek Zabrze

Senior career*
| Years | Team | Apps | (Gls) |
| 2018–2022 | Górnik Zabrze | 81 | (1) |
| 2018–2020 | Górnik Zabrze II | 9 | (0) |
| 2022–2023 | SC Paderborn | 0 | (0) |
| 2023–2024 | Raków Częstochowa | 0 | (0) |
| 2023–2024 | Raków Częstochowa II | 6 | (0) |
| 2024–2025 | Warta Poznań | 16 | (0) |
| 2025– | Zagłębie Sosnowiec | 22 | (1) |

International career
| 2018–2019 | Poland U20 | 7 | (0) |
- * Club domestic league appearances and goals as of 09:44, 31 May 2026 (UTC)

Adrian Gryszkiewicz (born 13 December 1999) is a Polish professional footballer who plays as a defender for III liga club Zagłębie Sosnowiec.

== Club career ==
On 5 June 2022, Gryszkiewicz signed with SC Paderborn in Germany.

On 10 January 2023, Gryszkiewicz returned to his native Poland when he joined Raków Częstochowa on a three-and-a-half-year deal with the option for a further year. On 18 March 2023, while playing for Raków's reserve side in a league match against Stal Brzeg, Gryszkiewicz suffered an injury to his articular cartilage and meniscus, ruling him out for approximately one year. He left the club after terminating his contract on 26 June 2024, without making a single appearance for Raków's senior team.

On 30 October 2024, Gryszkiewicz joined I liga side Warta Poznań for the remainder of the season with the option of a further year. The following day, he made his first appearance and start for the club in a 0–3 Polish Cup loss to Zagłębie Lubin.

On 27 June 2025, Gryszkiewicz agreed on a two-year deal with II liga club Zagłębie Sosnowiec.

== Career statistics ==
As of match played 30 May 2026

Appearances and goals by club, season and competition
| Club | Season | League | | | National cup (Note: Includes Polish Cup, DFB-Pokal) | | Europe | | Other | | Total | |
| Club | Season | Division | Apps | Goals | Apps | Goals | Apps | Goals | Apps | Goals | Apps | Goals |
|---|---|---|---|---|---|---|---|---|---|---|---|---|
| Górnik Zabrze | 2017–18 | Ekstraklasa | 9 | 0 | 2 | 0 | — | | — | | 11 | 0 |
| Górnik Zabrze | 2018–19 | Ekstraklasa | 22 | 0 | 2 | 0 | 4 (Note: Appearances in UEFA Europa League) | 0 | — | | 28 | 0 |
| Górnik Zabrze | 2019–20 | Ekstraklasa | 1 | 0 | — | | — | | — | | 1 | 0 |
| Górnik Zabrze | 2020–21 | Ekstraklasa | 27 | 0 | 2 | 0 | — | | — | | 29 | 0 |
| Górnik Zabrze | 2021–22 | Ekstraklasa | 22 | 1 | 3 | 0 | — | | — | | 25 | 1 |
| Górnik Zabrze | Total | | 81 | 1 | 9 | 0 | 4 | 0 | 0 | 0 | 94 | 1 |
| Górnik Zabrze II | 2017–18 | III liga, gr. III | 1 | 0 | — | | — | | — | | 1 | 0 |
| Górnik Zabrze II | 2018–19 | III liga, gr. III | 4 | 0 | — | | — | | — | | 4 | 0 |
| Górnik Zabrze II | 2019–20 | III liga, gr. III | 4 | 0 | — | | — | | — | | 4 | 0 |
| Górnik Zabrze II | Total | | 9 | 0 | — | | — | | — | | 9 | 0 |
| SC Paderborn | 2022–23 | 2. Bundesliga | 0 | 0 | 1 | 0 | — | | — | | 1 | 0 |
| Raków Częstochowa | 2022–23 | Ekstraklasa | 0 | 0 | 0 | 0 | — | | — | | 0 | 0 |
| Raków Częstochowa II | 2022–23 | III liga, gr. III | 2 | 0 | — | | — | | — | | 2 | 0 |
| Raków Częstochowa II | 2023–24 | III liga, gr. III | 4 | 0 | — | | — | | — | | 4 | 0 |
| Raków Częstochowa II | Total | | 6 | 0 | — | | — | | — | | 6 | 0 |
| Warta Poznań | 2024–25 | I liga | 16 | 0 | 1 | 0 | — | | — | | 17 | 0 |
| Zagłębie Sosnowiec | 2025–26 | II liga | 22 | 1 | 1 | 0 | — | | — | | 23 | 1 |
| Career total | | | 134 | 2 | 12 | 0 | 4 | 0 | 0 | 0 | 150 | 2 |

== Honours ==
Individual

- Ekstraklasa Young Player of the Month: September 2020
