= Dariusz Drągowski =

Polish footballer

Personal information
- Date of birth: 3 November 1970 (age 56)
- Place of birth: Białystok, Poland
- Height: 1.71 m (5 ft 7 in)
- Position: Midfielder

Youth career
- –1988: Jagiellonia Białystok

Senior career*
Years	Team	Apps	(Gls)
1988–1990	Jagiellonia Białystok	5	(0)
1990	Jagiellonia Białystok II		
1992–1995	Jagiellonia Białystok	83	(1)
1995–1997	Siarka Tarnobrzeg	54	(2)
1997–2002	Hetman Białystok	135	(11)
2000	→ Wigry Suwałki (loan)	8	(1)
Total		285	(15)
- * Club domestic league appearances and goals

Dariusz Drągowski (born 3 November 1970) is a Polish former professional footballer who played as a midfielder. He is the father of Bartłomiej Drągowski.

He graduated from the Mechanical School in Białystok. He is the product of the local Jagiellonia's youth system, and won the national junior championship in 1988 under Stefan Brewczyk. He debuted in the senior team the same year, and stayed until 1995, amassing 88 caps, of which 12 in the top division.

He then played for Siarka Tarnobrzeg, with 21 top division caps in the 1995–96 season. Having stayed another season after relegation, he returned to Białystok in 1997 to play for Hetman. He was loaned out to Wigry Suwałki in 2000, before retiring in 2002. After retirement, he became a customs officer.
