= Eniss Shabani =

Albania footballer (born 2003)

Personal information
- Date of birth: 29 May 2003 (age 23)
- Place of birth: Giessen, Germany
- Height: 1.80 m (5 ft 11 in)
- Position: Midfielder

Team information
- Current team: Śląsk Wrocław
- Number: 77

Youth career
- –2008: TSV Krofdorf-Gleiberg
- 2008–2012: FSG Wettenberg
- 2012–2014: TSG Wieseck
- 2015–2021: 1. FSV Mainz 05

Senior career*
Years	Team	Apps	(Gls)
2021–2025	1. FSV Mainz 05 II	85	(5)
2022–2025	1. FSV Mainz 05	1	(0)
2025–2026	Vukovar 1991	27	(0)
2026–	Śląsk Wrocław	3	(1)

International career
2018	Germany U16	1	(0)
2022	Germany U19	1	(0)
2023–2024	Albania U21	2	(0)
- * Club domestic league appearances and goals as of 23 August 2026

Eniss Shabani (born 29 May 2003) is a professional footballer who plays as a midfielder for Ekstraklasa club Śląsk Wrocław. Born in Germany, he is an Albania and Germany youth international.

== Early life ==
Shabani was born on 29 May 2003 in Giessen, Germany and is a native of Giessen. He was born to Kosovan father Veton Shabani and a mother from Bosnia and Herzegovina.

== Club career ==
As a youth player, Shabani joined the youth academy of German side TSV Krofdorf-Gleiberg. In 2008, he joined the youth academy of German side FSG Wettenberg. Four years later, he joined the youth academy of German side TSG Wieseck. Subsequently, he joined the youth academy of German side TSG Wieseck in 2014.

Following his stint there, he joined the youth academy of German Bundesliga side 1. FSV Mainz 05 and was promoted to the club's reserve team in 2021. Six months later, he was promoted to their senior team. On 13 May 2023, he debuted for them during a 3–0 away loss to Eintracht Frankfurt in the league.

== International career ==
Shabani is an Albania and Germany youth international. During October and November 2023, he played for the Albania under-21 team for the 2025 UEFA European Under-21 Championship qualification.
