= Zagłębie Lubin II =

Polish football club

Zagłębie Lubin
- Full name: Zagłębie Lubin Spółka Akcyjna
- Nickname: Miedziowi (The Coppers)
- Ground: Lubin City Stadium
- Capacity: 16,100
- Chairman: Artur Jankowski
- Manager: Arkadiusz Radomski
- League: III liga, group III
- 2025–26: III liga, group III, 5th of 18
- Website: www.zaglebie.com
Home colours	Away colours

Zagłębie Lubin II is a Polish football team, which serves as the reserve side of Zagłębie Lubin. They compete in the fourth division of Polish football.

The club participated in the Polish Cup in the 2007–08, 2014–15, 2017–18, 2019–20, 2023–24, 2024–25 and 2025–26seasons.

== Current squad ==
As of 1 March 2025

Note: Flags indicate national team as defined under FIFA eligibility rules; some limited exceptions apply. Players may hold more than one non-FIFA nationality.

No.	Pos.	Nation	Player
—	GK	POL	Adam Matysek
—	GK	POL	Daniel Słobodzian
—	DF	POL	Mateusz Bondarenko
—	DF	POL	Kamil Fura
—	DF	POL	Filip Jakubowski (on loan from Warta Poznań)
—	DF	POL	Kacper Lepczyński
—	DF	POL	Mateusz Lipp
—	DF	POL	Natan Malczuk (on loan from Chrobry Głogów)
—	DF	POL	Jeremi Osuch
—	DF	POL	Maciej Urbański
—	DF	POL	Marcel Wramba
—	MF	POL	Franciszek Antkiewicz
—	MF	POL	Maksym Czekała

No.	Pos.	Nation	Player
—	MF	POL	Jan Dorożko
—	MF	POL	Martin Frankowski
—	MF	POL	Kamil Koczy
—	MF	POL	Kacper Laskowski
—	MF	POL	Bartosz Moczyński
—	MF	POL	Kamil Nowogoński
—	MF	POL	Martin Rachubiński
—	MF	POL	Patryk Sobolewski
—	MF	POL	Tobiasz Starosta
—	MF	POL	Bartosz Zynek
—	FW	POL	Rafał Adamski
—	FW	POL	Dominik Gregorski
—	FW	POL	Paweł Kruszelnicki

=== Out on loan ===
Note: Flags indicate national team as defined under FIFA eligibility rules; some limited exceptions apply. Players may hold more than one non-FIFA nationality.

No.	Pos.	Nation	Player
—	DF	POL	Hubert Czerwiński (at Iskra Księginice until 30 June 2025)
—	MF	POL	Maciej Maćkow (at Iskra Księginice until 30 June 2025)

No.	Pos.	Nation	Player
—	DF	POL	Wiktor Maliszewski (at Carina Gubin until 30 June 2025)
—	MF	POL	Odyseusz Sygieniewicz (at Iskra Księginice until 30 June 2025)

== Honours ==
From the 2001–02 season onwards

- III liga
  - Lower Silesia
    - Champions: 2005–06 (Lower Silesia)
  - Lower Silesia-Lubusz
    - Runners-up: 2014–15
  - Group III
    - Champions: 2021–22
- IV liga
  - Legnica
    - Champions: 2002–03
  - Lower Silesia West
    - Champions: 2016–17
- Polish Cup (Lower Silesia regionals)
  - Winners: 2013–14, 2016–17, 2018–19
  - Runners-up: 2006–07, 2019–20
- Polish Cup (Legnica regionals)
  - Winners: 1985–86, 1986–87, 2006–07, 2008–09, 2013–14, 2016–17, 2018–19, 2019–20, 2020–21, 2021–22
  - Runners-up: 2005–06, 2017–18
