= Wojciech Hajda =

Polish footballer

Personal information
- Date of birth: 23 May 2000 (age 26)
- Place of birth: Bytom, Poland
- Height: 1.82 m (6 ft 0 in)
- Position: Midfielder

Team information
- Current team: Miedź Legnica
- Number: 70

Youth career
- –2013: Ruch Radzionków
- 2013–2017: Gwarek Zabrze

Senior career*
Years	Team	Apps	(Gls)
2017–2019	Górnik Zabrze II	19	(0)
2018–2022	Górnik Zabrze	13	(0)
2019–2020	→ Stomil Olsztyn (loan)	28	(1)
2021	→ Sandecja Nowy Sącz (loan)	16	(0)
2021–2022	→ Puszcza Niepołomice (loan)	30	(0)
2022–2025	Puszcza Niepołomice	75	(1)
2025–	Miedź Legnica	18	(1)
2025–	Miedź Legnica II	7	(0)
2026	→ Puszcza Niepołomice (loan)	14	(1)

International career
2015	Poland U15	2	(0)
2017	Poland U18	5	(0)
- * Club domestic league appearances and goals as of 20:36, 26 May 2026 (UTC)

Wojciech Hajda (born 23 May 2000) is a Polish professional footballer who plays as a midfielder for I liga club Miedź Legnica.

== Honours ==
Miedź Legnica II

- Lower Silesia Super Cup: 2025
