= Dawid Kudła =

Polish footballer

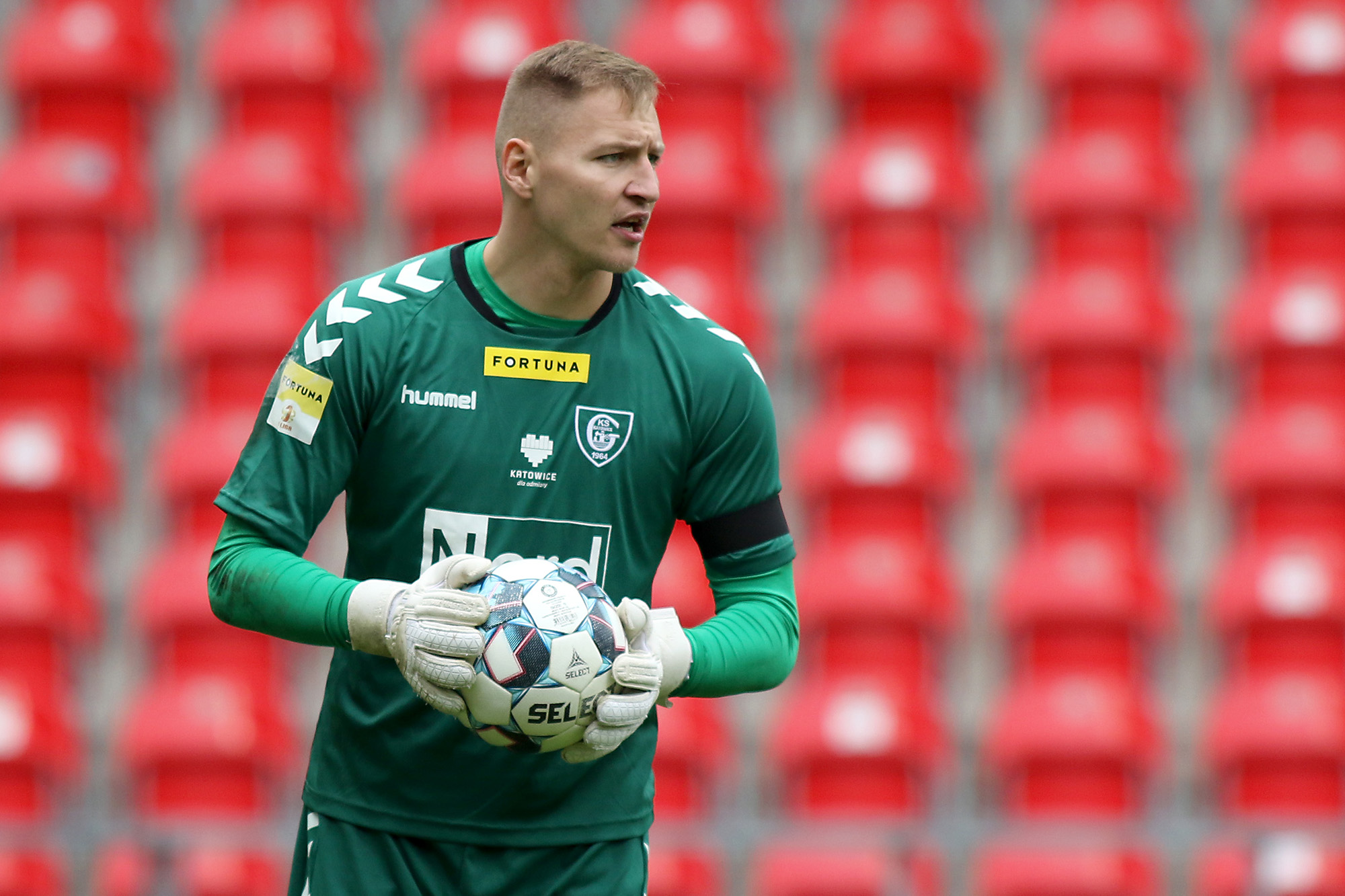
- Kudła with GKS Katowice in 2022

Personal information
- Full name: Dawid Kudła
- Date of birth: 21 March 1992 (age 34)
- Place of birth: Ruda Śląska, Poland
- Height: 1.90 m (6 ft 3 in)
- Position: Goalkeeper

Team information
- Current team: Zagłębie Sosnowiec
- Number: 1

Youth career
- –2011: Górnik Zabrze

Senior career*
| Years | Team | Apps | (Gls) |
| 2011–2012 | Dynamo Pervolion | | |
| 2012–2013 | Zagłębie Sosnowiec | 29 | (0) |
| 2013–2017 | Pogoń Szczecin | 40 | (0) |
| 2013–2017 | Pogoń Szczecin II | 13 | (0) |
| 2017–2019 | Zagłębie Sosnowiec | 57 | (0) |
| 2019–2021 | Górnik Zabrze | 0 | (0) |
| 2019–2021 | Górnik Zabrze II | 4 | (0) |
| 2021–2026 | GKS Katowice | 139 | (0) |
| 2026– | Zagłębie Sosnowiec | 0 | (0) |
- * Club domestic league appearances and goals as of 10:08, 30 May 2026 (UTC)

Dawid Kudła (born 21 March 1992) is a Polish professional footballer who plays as a goalkeeper for III liga club Zagłębie Sosnowiec.

== Career ==
Kudła joined Zagłębie Sosnowiec in June 2017. On 17 June 2019, the club announced that Kudła's contract had been terminated by mutual consent.

On 11 July 2019, he signed a two-year deal with Górnik Zabrze with an option for one further year.
