= Mariusz Fornalczyk =

Polish footballer (born 2003)

Personal information
- Date of birth: 15 January 2003 (age 23)
- Place of birth: Bytom, Poland
- Height: 1.75 m (5 ft 9 in)
- Position: Winger

Team information
- Current team: Widzew Łódź
- Number: 7

Youth career
- –2018: Polonia Bytom

Senior career*
Years	Team	Apps	(Gls)
2018–2020	Polonia Bytom	32	(3)
2020–2024	Pogoń Szczecin	50	(3)
2020–2023	Pogoń Szczecin II	18	(6)
2023	→ Bruk-Bet Termalica (loan)	14	(0)
2024–2025	Korona Kielce	41	(4)
2025–	Widzew Łódź	37	(3)

International career
2020	Poland U17	3	(1)
2021	Poland U19	5	(0)
2023	Poland U20	5	(0)
2022–2025	Poland U21	17	(3)
- * Club domestic league appearances and goals as of 20:29, 30 August 2026 (UTC)

Mariusz Fornalczyk (born 15 January 2003) is a Polish professional footballer who plays as a winger for Ekstraklasa club Widzew Łódź.

== Career ==
At the age of 15, Fornalczyk debuted for Polish fifth division side Polonia Bytom.

In 2020, he signed for Pogoń Szczecin in the Polish top flight.

On 23 February 2023, Fornalczyk was loaned until the end of the season to I liga side Bruk-Bet Termalica Nieciecza.

On 8 January 2024, Fornalczyk moved to fellow Ekstraklasa side Korona Kielce, signing a contract until mid-2026.

On 12 June 2025, Fornalczyk signed a five-year deal with another top-flight club Widzew Łódź, after Widzew activated his €1.5 million release clause.

== Career statistics ==
As of match played 23 May 2026

Appearances and goals by club, season and competition
Club	Season	League			Polish Cup		Europe		Other		Total	
Club	Season	Division	Apps	Goals	Apps	Goals	Apps	Goals	Apps	Goals	Apps	Goals
Polonia Bytom	2017–18	IV liga Silesia II	1	0	—		—		—		1	0
Polonia Bytom	2018–19	IV liga Silesia I	17	1	—		—		1 (Note: Appearance in IV liga Silesia promotion play-offs)	0	18	1
Polonia Bytom	2019–20	III liga, gr. III	13	2	—		—		—		13	2
Polonia Bytom	Total		31	3	—		—		1	0	32	3
Pogoń Szczecin	2020–21	Ekstraklasa	6	0	2	0	—		—		8	0
Pogoń Szczecin	2021–22	Ekstraklasa	18	1	1	0	—		—		19	1
Pogoń Szczecin	2022–23	Ekstraklasa	11	0	1	0	4 (Note: Appearances in UEFA Europa Conference League)	0	—		16	0
Pogoń Szczecin	2023–24	Ekstraklasa	15	2	2	0	3	1	—		0	0
Pogoń Szczecin	Total		50	3	6	0	7	1	—		63	4
Pogoń Szczecin II	2020–21	III liga, gr. II	9	4	—		—		—		9	4
Pogoń Szczecin II	2021–22	III liga, gr. II	5	0	—		—		—		5	0
Pogoń Szczecin II	2022–23	III liga, gr. II	4	2	0	0	—		—		0	0
Pogoń Szczecin II	Total		18	6	0	0	—		—		18	6
Bruk-Bet Termalica (loan)	2022–23	I liga	13	0	—		—		1 (Note: Appearance in I liga promotion play-offs)	0	14	0
Korona Kielce	2023–24	Ekstraklasa	11	0	1	0	—		—		12	0
Korona Kielce	2024–25	Ekstraklasa	30	3	4	0	—		—		34	3
Korona Kielce	Total		41	3	5	0	—		—		46	3
Widzew Łódź	2025–26	Ekstraklasa	31	1	4	0	—		—		35	1
Career total			184	16	15	0	7	1	2	0	208	17

== Honours ==
Polonia Bytom

- IV liga Silesia: 2017–18 (group II), 2018–19 (group I)
- Polish Cup (Bytom regionals): 2018–19

Individual

- Ekstraklasa Young Player of the Month: March 2025
