= Piotr Samiec-Talar =

Polish association football player

Personal information
- Full name: Piotr Samiec-Talar
- Date of birth: 2 November 2001 (age 25)
- Place of birth: Środa Śląska, Poland
- Height: 1.81 m (5 ft 11 in)
- Position: Forward

Team information
- Current team: Śląsk Wrocław
- Number: 7

Youth career
- –2017: Polonia Środa Śląska
- 2017–2018: Śląsk Wrocław

Senior career*
Years	Team	Apps	(Gls)
2018–	Śląsk Wrocław	138	(24)
2018–2023	Śląsk Wrocław II	46	(22)
2021	→ Widzew Łódź (loan)	17	(1)
2021	→ GKS Katowice (loan)	11	(0)

International career
2018	Poland U18	1	(0)
- * Club domestic league appearances and goals as of 09:58, 7 September 2026 (UTC)

Piotr Samiec-Talar (born 2 November 2001) is a Polish professional footballer who plays as a forward for and captains Ekstraklasa club Śląsk Wrocław.

== Senior career ==
Samiec-Talar began his career with Śląsk Wrocław. In 2018 he started training with the first team, making his first team appearance coming on as a substitute in the 5–0 away win against Miedź Legnica.

== International career ==
Samiec-Talar has played for the Poland U18's team, having made his youth international debut against Macedonia in a 1–0 win.

== Honours ==
Śląsk Wrocław II

- III liga, group III: 2019–20
- IV liga Lower Silesia East: 2018–19
- Ekstraklasa Player of the Month: August 2026
