= Sebastian Bergier =

Polish footballer

Personal information
- Date of birth: 20 December 1999 (age 26)
- Place of birth: Wrocław, Poland
- Height: 1.83 m (6 ft 0 in)
- Position: Forward

Team information
- Current team: Widzew Łódź
- Number: 99

Youth career
- –2017: Śląsk Wrocław

Senior career*
Years	Team	Apps	(Gls)
2017–2023	Śląsk Wrocław II	88	(48)
2017–2023	Śląsk Wrocław	31	(0)
2018	→ Stal Mielec (loan)	14	(0)
2019	→ Wigry Suwałki (loan)	4	(0)
2023–2025	GKS Katowice	70	(28)
2025–	Widzew Łódź	33	(16)

International career
2018	Poland U19	3	(1)
- * Club domestic league appearances and goals as of 23:28, 10 August 2026 (UTC)

Sebastian Bergier (born 20 December 1999) is a Polish professional footballer who plays as a forward for Ekstraklasa club Widzew Łódź.

== Honours ==
Śląsk Wrocław II

- III liga, group III: 2019–20
