= Mbaye Ndiaye =

Mbaye Ndiaye may refer to:

- Mbaye Ndiaye (politician) (fl. 2012-present), Senegalese politician
- Mbaye Ndiaye (basketball) (born 1999), Senegalese basketball player
- Mbaye Ndiaye (footballer) (born 2003), Senegalese football player
