= Rafał Adamski =

Polish footballer (born 2001)

Personal information
- Date of birth: 21 November 2001 (age 24)
- Place of birth: Dzierżoniów, Poland
- Height: 1.95 m (6 ft 5 in)
- Position: Forward

Team information
- Current team: Legia Warsaw
- Number: 9

Youth career
- Zieloni Łagiewniki
- –2017: Lechia Dzierżoniów
- 2017–2018: Miedź Legnica

Senior career*
Years	Team	Apps	(Gls)
2018–2020	Miedź Legnica II	24	(7)
2020	Miedź Legnica	0	(0)
2021–2025	Zagłębie Lubin II	96	(43)
2022–2025	Zagłębie Lubin	27	(2)
2024–2025	→ Warta Poznań (loan)	19	(2)
2025–2026	Pogoń Grodzisk Mazowiecki	20	(11)
2026–	Legia Warsaw	22	(8)
- * Club domestic league appearances and goals as of 13 October 2026

Rafał Adamski (born 21 November 2001) is a Polish professional footballer who plays as a forward for Ekstraklasa club Legia Warsaw.

== Career ==
Adamski began his career in the youth teams of Zieloni Łagiewniki, before moving to the youth side of Lechia Dzierżoniów. In July 2017, he joined the youth teams of Miedź Legnica. From the 2018–19 season, he played for the club's reserve team in the III liga. He also made one appearance for the first team, playing on 22 August 2020 in a 0–4 defeat against Radomiak Radom in the first round of the Polish Cup.

In December 2020, Adamski joined Zagłębie Lubin. Thanks to his performances in the reserves, Adamski made his debut for the first team and in the Ekstraklasa on 6 May 2022 in a 6–1 win against Radomiak Radom.

In the autumn round of the 2022–23 Ekstraklasa season, due to problems with other Zagłębie forwards (injury to Dawid Kurminowski and poor form of Martin Doležal and Szymon Kobusiński), Adamski began to play an important role in the first team, making 14 league appearances and scoring two goals. In the spring round, however, following the return to fitness of Kurminowski and the signing of Jakub Świerczok, he made only five appearances.

In the 2022–23 season, Adamski also played for Zagłębie's reserve team in the II liga, making 16 appearances, scoring seven goals and providing one assist. In the 2024–25 season, he was loaned to Warta Poznań.

On 1 July 2025, Adamski joined I liga side Pogoń Grodzisk Mazowiecki. In Pogoń, he had an excellent first half of the season, recording 11 goals and 10 assists in 20 league matches. This form resulted in a transfer and a three-and-a-half-year contract with Ekstraklasa side Legia Warsaw. Adamski was officially announced as a Legia player on 11 February 2026. He made his debut on 21 February in a 2–1 home win over Wisła Płock in the Ekstraklasa, scoring a goal.

== Honours ==
Zagłębie Lubin II

- III liga, group III: 2021–22
- Polish Cup (Legnica regionals): 2021–22

Individual

- I liga Discovery of the Season: 2025–26
