= 2024–25 Polish Cup =

Puchar Polski

Tournament details
- Country: Poland
- Dates: 6 August 2024 – 2 May 2025
- Teams: 70

Final positions
- Champions: Legia Warsaw (21st title)
- Runners-up: Pogoń Szczecin
- UEFA Europa League: Legia Warsaw

Tournament statistics
- Matches played: 69
- Goals scored: 220 (3.19 per match)
- Top goal scorer(s): Szymon Krocz; Ryōya Morishita (4 goals each)

The 2024–25 Polish Cup (Polish: Puchar Polski [ˌpuxar ˈpɔlskʲi]) was the 71st season of the annual Polish football knockout tournament. The competition began on 6 August 2024 with the preliminary round and ended on 2 May 2025 with the final match at the Stadion Narodowy in Warsaw. The Polish Cup is considered the second-most important club title in Polish football after the Ekstraklasa championship. The competition was organised by the Polish Football Association (PZPN). Winners of the competition qualified for the first qualifying round of the 2025–26 UEFA Europa League.

The defending champions Wisła Kraków were knocked out by fellow second-tier side Polonia Warsaw in the round of 16. In the final, Legia Warsaw defeated Pogoń Szczecin 4–3 to win their 21st cup title.

== Participating teams ==
Teams starting the competition from the round of 32	Teams starting the competition from the first round			Teams starting the competition from the preliminary round	
2024–25 UEFA club competitions 4 teams	2023–24 Ekstraklasa; 15 teams (teams not participating in 2024–25 UEFA club competitions)	2023–24 I liga 15 teams (from position 1–16, teams not participating in 2024–25 UEFA club competitions)	Winners of 16 regional cup competitions 16 teams	2023–24 I liga 2 teams (from position 17–18)	2023–24 II liga 18 teams
Jagiellonia Białystok; Śląsk Wrocław; Legia Warsaw; Wisła Kraków	Pogoń Szczecin; Lech Poznań; Górnik Zabrze; Raków Częstochowa; Zagłębie Lubin; Widzew Łódź; Piast Gliwice; Stal Mielec; Puszcza Niepołomice; Cracovia; Korona Kielce; Radomiak Radom; Warta Poznań; Ruch Chorzów; ŁKS Łódź	Lechia Gdańsk; GKS Katowice; Arka Gdynia; Motor Lublin; Górnik Łęczna; Odra Opole; Wisła Płock; Miedź Legnica; GKS Tychy; Stal Rzeszów; Chrobry Głogów; Znicz Pruszków; Bruk-Bet Termalica Nieciecza; Polonia Warsaw; Resovia Rzeszów	Barycz Sułów (dolnośląskie); Elana Toruń (kujawsko-pomorskie); Avia Świdnik (lubelskie); Lechia Zielona Góra (lubuskie); Unia Skierniewice (łódzkie); Podhale Nowy Targ (małopolskie); Pogoń Grodzisk Mazowiecki (mazowieckie); MKS Kluczbork (opolskie); Siarka Tarnobrzeg (podkarpackie); Wigry Suwałki (podlaskie); Grom Nowy Staw (pomorskie); Podbeskidzie Bielsko-Biała II (śląskie); Star Starachowice (świętokrzyskie); Concordia Elbląg (warmińsko-mazurskie); Unia Swarzędz (wielkopolskie); Świt Szczecin (zachodniopomorskie)	Podbeskidzie Bielsko-Biała; Zagłębie Sosnowiec	Pogoń Siedlce; Kotwica Kołobrzeg; KKS 1925 Kalisz; Stal Stalowa Wola; Chojniczanka Chojnice; Polonia Bytom; Radunia Stężyca; Hutnik Kraków; Zagłębie Lubin II; ŁKS Łódź II; GKS Jastrzębie; Wisła Puławy; Olimpia Elbląg; Olimpia Grudziądz; Skra Częstochowa; Lech Poznań II; Sandecja Nowy Sącz; Stomil Olsztyn

== Prize money ==
The PZPN Board of Directors determined the size of the prizes.

Round reached	Amount
First round	regional cup winner: 40,000 PLN remainder teams: 15,000 PLN
Round of 32	45,000 PLN
Round of 16	90,000 PLN
Quarter-finals	190,000 PLN
Semi-finals	380,000 PLN
Final	1,000,000 PLN
Winner	5,000,000 PLN

== Round and draw dates ==
Round	Draw date	Number of teams	Date of matches	Teams entered for the competition
Preliminary round	None	70 → 60	6–7 August 2024	• 2023–24 I liga teams from positions 17–18, • 2023–24 II liga teams.
First round	20 August 2024	60 → 32	24 September – 2 October 2024	• 2023–24 Ekstraklasa and top 15 2023–24 I liga teams not participating in 2024–25 UEFA club competitions, • 16 winners of the regional cups.
Round of 32	30 September 2024	32 → 16	12–31 October 2024	• 2023–24 Ekstraklasa and 2023–24 I liga teams participating in 2024–25 UEFA club competitions.
Round of 16	4 November 2024	16 → 8	3–5 December 2024	None
Quarter-finals	6 December 2024	8 → 4	25–27 February 2025	None
Semi-finals	2 March 2025	4 → 2	1–2 April 2025	None
Final	None	2	2 May 2025	None

== Preliminary round ==
The matches were played on 6–7 August 2024. Participating in this round were the 2 lowest ranked teams from 2023–24 I liga (which finished 2023–24 season on positions 17–18) and 18 teams from the 2023–24 II liga. With reference to the competition regulations, the matches were played according to the following scheme:

- 17th team of 2023–24 I liga season will be a host of match against 18th team of 2023–24 II liga season,
- 18th team of I liga season will be a host of match against 17th team of II liga season,
- 1st team of II liga season will be a host of match against 16th team of II liga season,
- 2nd team of II liga season will be a host of match against 15th team of II liga season,
- 3rd team of II liga season will be a host of match against 14th team of II liga season,
- 4th team of II liga season will be a host of match against 13th team of II liga season,
- 5th team of II liga season will be a host of match against 12th team of II liga season,
- 6th team of II liga season will be a host of match against 11th team of II liga season,
- 7th team of II liga season will be a host of match against 10th team of II liga season,
- 8th team of II liga season will be a host of match against 9th team of II liga season.

Number of teams per tier still in competition
2023–24 Ekstraklasa	2023–24 I liga	2023–24 II liga	2023–24 Regional cup winners	Total
18 / 18	18 / 18	18 / 18	16 / 16	70 / 70

Team 1	Score	Team 2
6 August 2024
Podbeskidzie Bielsko-Biała (3)	2–0	Stomil Olsztyn (4)
Pogoń Siedlce (2)	0–2	Lech Poznań II (4)
Polonia Bytom (3)	2–0	GKS Jastrzębie (3)
Hutnik Kraków (3)	4–1 (a.e.t.)	Zagłębie Lubin II (3)
7 August 2024
Zagłębie Sosnowiec (3)	0–1	Sandecja Nowy Sącz (4)
Kotwica Kołobrzeg (2)	2–1	Skra Częstochowa (3)
KKS 1925 Kalisz (3)	0–2	Olimpia Grudziądz (3)
Stal Stalowa Wola (2)	4–2	Olimpia Elbląg (3)
Chojniczanka Chojnice (3)	3–2	Wisła Puławy (3)
Radunia Stężyca (5)	1–2	ŁKS Łódź II (3)

6 August 2024	Hutnik Kraków (3)	4–1 (a.e.t.)	Zagłębie Lubin II (3)	Kraków
16:00	Szablowski 5'; Urbańczyk 114'; Rakels 120'; Budziński 120+3'	Report	Tarkowski 54'	Stadium: Suche Stawy Stadium; Attendance: 300; Referee: Rafał Szydełko (Rzeszów)

6 August 2024	Pogoń Siedlce (2)	0–2	Lech Poznań II (4)	Siedlce
17:00		Report	Wilak 6'; Wichtowski 34'	Stadium: Stadion Miejski; Attendance: 873; Referee: Sebastian Godek (Rzeszów)

6 August 2024	Podbeskidzie Bielsko-Biała (3)	2–0	Stomil Olsztyn (4)	Bielsko-Biała
19:00	Gach 23'; Jakubowski 90+2' (o.g.)	Report		Stadium: Bielsko-Biała Stadium; Attendance: 1,564; Referee: Patryk Świerczek (Brzesko)

6 August 2024	Polonia Bytom (3)	2–0	GKS Jastrzębie (3)	Bytom
19:20	Andrzejczak 17'; Wypart 56'	Report		Stadium: Polonia Stadium; Attendance: 760; Referee: Aleksander Kozieł (Kielce)

7 August 2024	KKS 1925 Kalisz (3)	0–2	Olimpia Grudziądz (3)	Kalisz
17:00		Report	Kaczmarek 51' (pen.); Frelek 81'	Stadium: Stadion Miejski; Attendance: 380; Referee: Albert Różycki (Łódź)

7 August 2024	Stal Stalowa Wola (2)	4–2	Olimpia Elbląg (3)	Stalowa Wola
17:00	Pchełka 4'; Łącki 8'; Švec 21'; Wojtkowski 66'	Report	Kordykiewicz 45+1'; Kuzimski 61'	Stadium: Subcarpathian Football Center; Attendance: 1,971; Referee: Maciej Kuropatwa (Katowice)

7 August 2024	Radunia Stężyca (5)	1–2	ŁKS Łódź II (3)	Stężyca
17:30	Maliszewski 5'	Report	Rozwandowicz 31'; Sławiński 54' (pen.)	Stadium: Arena Radunia; Attendance: 250; Referee: Paweł Wrzeszczyński (Kalisz)

7 August 2024	Zagłębie Sosnowiec (3)	0–1	Sandecja Nowy Sącz (4)	Sosnowiec
18:00		Report	Kwietniewski 43'	Stadium: Zagłębiowski Park Sportowy; Attendance: 4,656; Referee: Michał Kramski (Świebodzin)

7 August 2024	Kotwica Kołobrzeg (2)	2–1	Skra Częstochowa (3)	Kołobrzeg
18:00	Petrović 55'; Kreković 83'	Report	Stangret 40'	Stadium: Stadion Miejski; Attendance: 837; Referee: Filip Kaliszewski (Gdańsk)

7 August 2024	Chojniczanka Chojnice (3)	3–2	Wisła Puławy (3)	Chojnice
19:30	Boczek 2'; Kamiński 20'; Biskup 68' (pen.)	Report	Gałązka 56'; Kumoch 65'	Stadium: Stadion Miejski; Attendance: 995; Referee: Szymon Rutkowski (Bydgoszcz)

== First round ==
The draw for this round was conducted in the headquarter of Telewizja Polska on 20 August 2024. The matches were played from 24 September to 2 October 2024. Participating in this round were the 10 winners from the previous round, 15 teams from 2023–24 Ekstraklasa and top 15 teams of 2023–24 I liga which were not qualified to 2024–25 UEFA club competitions together with the 16 winners of the regional cup competitions. Games were hosted by teams playing in the lower division in the 2024–25 season or by first drawn team in a case of match between clubs from the same division.

Number of teams per tier still in competition
2023–24 Ekstraklasa	2023–24 I liga	2023–24 II liga	2023–24 Regional cup winners	Total
18 / 18	17 / 18	9 / 18	16 / 16	60 / 70

Team 1	Score	Team 2
24 September 2024
ŁKS Łódź II (3)	2–3	Kotwica Kołobrzeg (2)
Elana Toruń (4)	1–3	Widzew Łódź (1)
Bruk-Bet Termalica Nieciecza (2)	1–2	GKS Katowice (1)
Pogoń Grodzisk Mazowiecki (3)	1–1 (a.e.t.) (4–3 p)	Lechia Gdańsk (1)
Podbeskidzie Bielsko-Biała II (5)	0–5	Odra Opole (2)
Wisła Płock (2)	0–1	Warta Poznań (2)
Stal Rzeszów (2)	0–3	Pogoń Szczecin (1)
Sandecja Nowy Sącz (4)	3–2 (a.e.t.)	Cracovia (1)
25 September 2024
MKS Kluczbork (4)	2–1	Unia Swarzędz (4)
Podhale Nowy Targ (4)	0–2	Ruch Chorzów (2)
Stal Stalowa Wola (2)	2–2 (a.e.t.) (2–3 p)	Arka Gdynia (2)
Chojniczanka Chojnice (3)	3–2	Znicz Pruszków (2)
Olimpia Grudziądz (3)	4–2	GKS Tychy (2)
Górnik Łęczna (2)	1–1 (a.e.t.) (9–10 p)	Puszcza Niepołomice (1)
Hutnik Kraków (3)	3–3 (a.e.t.) (3–5 p)	Piast Gliwice (1)
Barycz Sułów (5)	0–0 (a.e.t.) (3–5 p)	Lech Poznań II (4)
Miedź Legnica (2)	0–0 (a.e.t.) (4–3 p)	Raków Częstochowa (1)
Siarka Tarnobrzeg (4)	4–1	Star Starachowice (4)
Górnik Zabrze (1)	0–1 (a.e.t.)	Radomiak Radom (1)
Avia Świdnik (4)	3–3 (a.e.t.) (6–5 p)	Polonia Bytom (3)
Concordia Elbląg (5)	0–2	Lechia Zielona Góra (4)
Korona Kielce (1)	1–1 (a.e.t.) (4–3 p)	Stal Mielec (1)
Chrobry Głogów (2)	1–2	Polonia Warsaw (2)
Wigry Suwałki (4)	3–1 (a.e.t.)	Świt Szczecin (3)
26 September 2024
Podbeskidzie Bielsko-Biała (3)	0–0 (a.e.t.) (3–4 p)	Zagłębie Lubin (1)
Grom Nowy Staw (5)	0–2	ŁKS Łódź (2)
Resovia (3)	1–0	Lech Poznań (1)
2 October 2024
Unia Skierniewice (4)	1–1 (a.e.t.) (5–4 p)	Motor Lublin (1)

24 September 2024	Sandecja Nowy Sącz	3–2 (a.e.t.)	Cracovia	Nowy Sącz
13:00 CEST (UTC+02:00)	Wilczyński 56', 117'; Kowalik 90'	Report	Ghiță 81'; Hasić 85'	Stadium: Stadion im. Ojca Władysława Augustynka; Attendance: 0 Referee: Patryk Świerczek (Brzesko)

24 September 2024	Pogoń Grodzisk Mazowiecki	1–1 (a.e.t.) (4–3 p)	Lechia Gdańsk	Grodzisk Mazowiecki
14:30 CEST (UTC+02:00)	Noiszewski 90'	Report	D'Arrigo 50'	Stadium: Stadion Miejski; Attendance: 945; Referee: Piotr Idzik (Poznań)
	Penalties
	Jaroń (penalty scored); Łoś (penalty missed); Dias (penalty scored); Noiszewski (penalty scored); Niewiadomski (penalty scored)		(penalty scored) Kapić; (penalty scored) Zhelizko; (penalty missed) Pllana; (penalty scored) Guého; (penalty missed) Vyunnyk

24 September 2024	Podbeskidzie Bielsko-Biała II	0–5	Odra Opole	Bielsko-Biała
15:00 CEST (UTC+02:00)		Report	Domínguez 9'; Kamiński 36'; Szkliński 38', 57'; Czupryński 87' (o.g.)	Stadium: Boisko Piłkarskie Zapora; Attendance: 255; Referee: Paweł Pskit (Łódź)

24 September 2024	ŁKS Łódź II	2–3	Kotwica Kołobrzeg	Łódź
17:00 CEST (UTC+02:00)	Wzięch 66'; Popławski 90'	Report	Rajsel 47'; Jonathan 48', 72' (pen.)	Stadium: Stadion Miejski im. Władysława Króla; Attendance: 310; Referee: Damian Gawęcki (Kielce)

24 September 2024	Elana Toruń	1–3	Widzew Łódź	Toruń
17:30 CEST (UTC+02:00)	Kuropatwiński 29' (pen.)	Report	Kerk 65'; Kwiatkowski 87'; Łukowski 90'	Stadium: Stadion Miejski im. Grzegorza Duneckiego; Attendance: 4,123; Referee: Marcin Szczerbowicz (Olsztyn)

24 September 2024	Wisła Płock	0–1	Warta Poznań	Płock
18:00 CEST (UTC+02:00)		Report	Kocyła 59' (o.g.)	Stadium: Orlen Stadion im. Kazimierza Górskiego; Attendance: 4,013; Referee: Wojciech Myć (Lublin)

24 September 2024	Bruk-Bet Termalica Nieciecza	1–2	GKS Katowice	Nieciecza
19:22 CEST (UTC+02:00)	Karasek 45'	Report	Jaroszek 19'; Antczak 66'	Stadium: Nieciecza Stadium; Attendance: 2,348; Referee: Piotr Urban (Warsaw)

24 September 2024	Stal Rzeszów	0–3	Pogoń Szczecin	Rzeszów
20:30 CEST (UTC+02:00)		Report	Kurzawa 24'; Koulouris 71'; Bichakhchyan 85'	Stadium: Stadion Miejski; Attendance: 5,176; Referee: Łukasz Kuźma (Białystok)

25 September 2024	Hutnik Kraków	3–3 (a.e.t.) (3–5 p)	Piast Gliwice	Kraków
14:30 CEST (UTC+02:00)	Szablowski 80'; Belych 87', 117'	Report	Piasecki 7'; Kostadinov 40'; Félix 110' (pen.)	Stadium: Suche Stawy Stadium; Attendance: 557; Referee: Damian Kos (Gdańsk)
	Penalties
	Belych (penalty scored); Głogowski (penalty scored); Hoyo-Kowalski (penalty missed); Kędziora (penalty scored)		(penalty scored) Tomasiewicz; (penalty scored) Félix; (penalty scored) Szczepański; (penalty scored) Pyrka; (penalty scored) Huk

25 September 2024	Podhale Nowy Targ	0–2	Ruch Chorzów	Nowy Targ
15:00 CEST (UTC+02:00)		Report	Kozak 30'; Novothny 54'	Stadium: Stadion Miejski; Attendance: 950; Referee: Łukasz Szczech (Warsaw)

25 September 2024	Siarka Tarnobrzeg	4–1	Star Starachowice	Tarnobrzeg
15:30 CEST (UTC+02:00)	Lisowski 30', 45'; Iwao 60'; Lisowski 87'	Report	Wcisło 5'	Stadium: Tarnobrzeg Municipal Stadium; Attendance: 829; Referee: Rafał Szydełko (Rzeszów)

25 September 2024	Concordia Elbląg	0–2	Lechia Zielona Góra	Elbląg
15:30 CEST (UTC+02:00)		Report	Zientarski 52' (pen.); Mycan 77'	Stadium: Stadion Miejski; Attendance: 140; Referee: Filip Kaliszewski (Gdańsk)

25 September 2024	Avia Świdnik	3–3 (a.e.t.) (6–5 p)	Polonia Bytom	Świdnik
15:30 CEST (UTC+02:00)	Remenyuk 39', 97'; Marek 90'	Report	Wojtyra 13'; Szumilas 37'; Konieczny 95'	Stadium: Stadion Miejski; Attendance: 1,110; Referee: Sebastian Godek (Rzeszów)
	Penalties
	Galara (penalty scored); Maj (penalty scored); Kursa (penalty scored); Wróblewski (penalty scored); Małecki (penalty scored); Zagórski (penalty scored)		(penalty scored) Ściślak; (penalty scored) Andrzejczak; (penalty scored) Żagiel; (penalty scored) Wojtyra; (penalty scored) Konieczny; (penalty missed) Piekarski

25 September 2024	Korona Kielce	1–1 (a.e.t.) (4–3 p)	Stal Mielec	Kielce
17:30 CEST (UTC+02:00)	Resta 15'	Report	Dadok 83'	Stadium: Exbud Arena; Attendance: 6,053; Referee: Patryk Gryckiewicz (Toruń)
	Penalties
	Nuno (penalty scored); Trojak (penalty scored); Konstantyn (penalty missed); Matuszewski (penalty scored); Długosz (penalty scored)		(penalty scored) Wołkowicz; (penalty scored) Matras; (penalty missed) Assayag; (penalty missed) Gerbowski; (penalty scored) Dadok

25 September 2024	Wigry Suwałki	3–1 (a.e.t.)	Świt Szczecin	Suwałki
18:00 CEST (UTC+02:00)	Zalewski 47'; Ozga 105'; Cudowski 117'	Report	Ropski 58'	Stadium: Stadion Miejski; Attendance: 693; Referee: Damian Krumplewski (Olsztyn)

25 September 2024	Olimpia Grudziądz	4–2	GKS Tychy	Grudziądz
18:00 CEST (UTC+02:00)	Krocz 26', 71', 86'; Cichoń 59'	Report	Hołownia 20'; Błachewicz 38'	Stadium: Bronisław Malinowski Stadium; Attendance: 600; Referee: Łukasz Karski (Słupsk)

25 September 2024	MKS Kluczbork	2–1	Unia Swarzędz	Kluczbork
18:00 CEST (UTC+02:00)	Janicki 31', 90'	Report	Chromiński 36'	Stadium: Stadion Miejski; Attendance: 210; Referee: Paweł Wrzeszczyński (Kalisz)

25 September 2024	Chrobry Głogów	1–2	Polonia Warsaw	Głogów
18:00 CEST (UTC+02:00)	Biel 90'	Report	Kobusiński 18'; Koton 59'	Stadium: Stadion GOS; Attendance: 589; Referee: Albert Różycki (Łódź)

25 September 2024	Barycz Sułów	0–0 (a.e.t.) (3–5 p)	Lech Poznań II	Sułów
18:30 CEST (UTC+02:00)		Report		Stadium: Stadion Miejski; Attendance: 1,000; Referee: Michał Kramski (Świebodzin)
	Penalties
	Bogusławski (penalty scored); Smektała (penalty scored); Kacprzak (penalty missed); Puchała (penalty scored)		(penalty scored) Wichtowski; (penalty scored) Gmur; (penalty scored) Szymczak; (penalty scored) Falkiewicz; (penalty scored) Niedzielski

25 September 2024	Stal Stalowa Wola	2–2 (a.e.t.) (2–3 p)	Arka Gdynia	Stalowa Wola
19:00 CEST (UTC+02:00)	Švec 15'; Tavares 116'	Report	Czubak 80'; Navarro 109'	Stadium: Subcarpathian Football Center; Attendance: 1,950; Referee: Jacek Małyszek (Lublin)
	Penalties
	Kukułowicz (penalty missed); Soszyński (penalty missed); Zaucha (penalty scored); Tavares (penalty missed); Furtak (penalty scored)		(penalty scored) Marcjanik; (penalty missed) Rzuchowski; (penalty scored) Navarro; (penalty missed) Kocaba; (penalty scored) Oliveira

25 September 2024	Miedź Legnica	0–0 (a.e.t.) (4–3 p)	Raków Częstochowa	Legnica
19:00 CEST (UTC+02:00)		Report		Stadium: White Eagle Municipal Stadium; Attendance: 3,553; Referee: Jarosław Przybył (Kluczbork)
	Penalties
	Mioč (penalty scored); Mansfeld (penalty scored); Hartherz (penalty missed); Bida (penalty scored); Drzazga (penalty scored)		(penalty missed) Svárnas; (penalty scored) Rundić; (penalty scored) Kocherhin; (penalty missed) Carlos; (penalty scored) Berggren

25 September 2024	Górnik Łęczna	1–1 (a.e.t.) (9–10 p)	Puszcza Niepołomice	Łęczna
19:00 CEST (UTC+02:00)	Akhmedov 33'	Report	Kosidis 74'	Stadium: Łęczna Stadium; Attendance: 1,418; Referee: Grzegorz Kawałko (Olsztyn)
	Penalties
	Turski (penalty scored); de Amo (penalty scored); Orlik (penalty scored); Barauskas (penalty scored); Warchoł (penalty scored); Ogaga (penalty scored); Akhmedov (penalty scored); Szabaciuk (penalty scored); Roginić (penalty scored); Traoré (penalty missed); Pindroch (penalty missed); Turski (penalty missed)		(penalty scored) Crăciun; (penalty scored) Sipľak; (penalty scored) Yakuba; (penalty scored) Kosidis; (penalty scored) Jin-hyun; (penalty scored) Mroziński; (penalty scored) Revenco; (penalty scored) Abramowicz; (penalty scored) Perchel; (penalty missed) Tomalski; (penalty missed) Serafin; (penalty scored) Crăciun

25 September 2024	Chojniczanka Chojnice	3–2	Znicz Pruszków	Chojnice
19:30 CEST (UTC+02:00)	Kozina 17'; Bąkowicz 71'; Kamiński 90'	Report	Stanclik 24'; Olejarka 36'	Stadium: Stadion Miejski; Attendance: 711; Referee: Sylwester Rasmus (Toruń)

25 September 2024	Górnik Zabrze	0–1 (a.e.t.)	Radomiak Radom	Zabrze
20:30 CEST (UTC+02:00)		Report	Alves 93'	Stadium: Arena Zabrze; Attendance: 8,741; Referee: Marcin Kochanek (Opole)

26 September 2024	Grom Nowy Staw	0–2	ŁKS Łódź	Nowy Staw
12:15 CEST (UTC+02:00)		Report	Arasa 83'; Panek 90' (o.g.)	Stadium: Stadion Miejski; Attendance: 800; Referee: Karol Arys (Szczecin)

26 September 2024	Podbeskidzie Bielsko-Biała	0–0 (a.e.t.) (3–4 p)	Zagłębie Lubin	Bielsko-Biała
14:30 CEST (UTC+02:00)		Report		Stadium: Bielsko-Biała Stadium; Attendance: 1,052; Referee: Sebastian Krasny (Kraków)
	Penalties
	Tomczyk (penalty scored); Biernat (penalty scored); Mršić (penalty scored); Majsterek (penalty missed); Zając (penalty missed)		(penalty missed) Dąbrowski; (penalty scored) Mikołajewski; (penalty scored) Reguła; (penalty scored) Adamczyk; (penalty scored) Radwański

26 September 2024	Resovia	1–0	Lech Poznań	Rzeszów
17:00 CEST (UTC+02:00)	Hebel 16'	Report		Stadium: Stal Rzeszów Municipal Stadium; Attendance: 3,656; Referee: Tomasz Kwiatkowski (Warsaw)

2 October 2024	Unia Skierniewice	1–1 (a.e.t.) (5–4 p)	Motor Lublin	Skierniewice
19:00 CEST (UTC+02:00)	Papikyan 30'	Report	Luberecki 54'	Stadium: Stadion Miejski; Attendance: 2,232; Referee: Piotr Rzucidło (Warsaw)
	Penalties
	Stępień (penalty scored); Sołtysiński (penalty scored); Kowalczyk (penalty scored); Łapiński (penalty scored); Sabiłło (penalty scored)		(penalty scored) Scalet; (penalty scored) Wolski; (penalty scored) Rudol; (penalty missed) Caliskaner; (penalty scored) Wójcik

== Round of 32 ==
The draw for this round was conducted in the headquarter of Telewizja Polska on 30 September 2024. The matches were played from 12 to 31 October 2024. Participating in this round were the 28 winners from the previous round and 4 teams which were qualified to 2024–25 UEFA club competitions. Games were hosted by teams playing in a lower division in the 2024–25 season or by first drawn team in a case of match between clubs from the same division.

Number of teams per tier still in competition
2023–24 Ekstraklasa	2023–24 I liga	2023–24 II liga	2023–24 Regional cup winners	Total
13 / 18	7 / 18	5 / 18	7 / 16	32 / 70

Team 1	Score	Team 2
12 October 2024
Siarka Tarnobrzeg (4)	2–3	Wisła Kraków (2)
29 October 2024
Kotwica Kołobrzeg (2)	0–1	Puszcza Niepołomice (1)
Radomiak Radom (1)	0–3	Śląsk Wrocław (1)
Avia Świdnik (4)	1–3	Ruch Chorzów (2)
Odra Opole (2)	0–1 (a.e.t.)	Pogoń Szczecin (1)
Olimpia Grudziądz (3)	3–2	Resovia (3)
30 October 2024
MKS Kluczbork (4)	0–1	ŁKS Łódź (2)
Chojniczanka Chojnice (3)	0–3	Jagiellonia Białystok (1)
Sandecja Nowy Sącz (4)	1–0	Pogoń Grodzisk Mazowiecki (3)
Wigry Suwałki (4)	2–3	Polonia Warsaw (2)
Lech Poznań II (4)	1–3	Korona Kielce (1)
Unia Skierniewice (4)	2–1	GKS Katowice (1)
Arka Gdynia (2)	1–3 (a.e.t.)	Piast Gliwice (1)
31 October 2024
Miedź Legnica (2)	1–2	Legia Warsaw (1)
Lechia Zielona Góra (4)	3–3 (a.e.t.) (3–5 p)	Widzew Łódź (1)
Warta Poznań (2)	0–3	Zagłębie Lubin (1)

12 October 2024	Siarka Tarnobrzeg	2–3	Wisła Kraków	Tarnobrzeg
14:15 CEST (UTC+02:00)	Lisowski 49'; Iwao 68'	Report	Rodado 37'; Zwoliński 47'; Uryga 89'	Stadium: Tarnobrzeg Municipal Stadium; Attendance: 2,680; Referee: Piotr Szypuła (Bielsko-Biała)

29 October 2024	Avia Świdnik	1–3	Ruch Chorzów	Świdnik
12:00 CET (UTC+01:00)	Uliczny 56' (pen.)	Report	Szczepan 15'; Myszor 57'; Ventúra 77'	Stadium: Stadion Miejski; Attendance: 1,980; Referee: Łukasz Szczech (Warsaw)

29 October 2024	Odra Opole	0–1 (a.e.t.)	Pogoń Szczecin	Opole
15:00 CET (UTC+01:00)		Report	Grosicki 92'	Stadium: Stadion Miejski; Attendance: 2,173; Referee: Damian Sylwestrzak (Wrocław)

29 October 2024	Kotwica Kołobrzeg	0–1	Puszcza Niepołomice	Kołobrzeg
17:00 CET (UTC+01:00)		Report	Siemaszko 53'	Stadium: Stadion Miejski; Attendance: 300; Referee: Sylwester Rasmus (Toruń)

29 October 2024	Olimpia Grudziądz	3–2	Resovia	Grudziądz
18:00 CET (UTC+01:00)	Rychert 44', 48'; Krocz 67'	Report	Górski 61'; Wasiluk 90+6' (pen.)	Stadium: Bronisław Malinowski Stadium; Attendance: 460; Referee: Filip Kaliszewski (Gdańsk)

29 October 2024	Radomiak Radom	0–3	Śląsk Wrocław	Radom
21:00 CET (UTC+01:00)		Report	Paluszek 45', 61'; Musiolik 74'	Stadium: Czachor Brothers Stadium; Attendance: 4,004; Referee: Daniel Stefański (Bydgoszcz)

30 October 2024	Sandecja Nowy Sącz	1–0	Pogoń Grodzisk Mazowiecki	Nowy Sącz
13:00 CET (UTC+01:00)	Smajdor 59'	Report		Stadium: Father Władysław Augustynek Stadium; Attendance: 0 Referee: Damian Gawęcki (Kielce)

30 October 2024	Lech Poznań II	1–3	Korona Kielce	Wronki
13:00 CET (UTC+01:00)	Warciarek 83'	Report	Shikavka 7', 15'; Trejo 30'	Stadium: Lech Academy Stadium; Attendance: 260; Referee: Tomasz Wajda (Żywiec)

30 October 2024	Chojniczanka Chojnice	0–3	Jagiellonia Białystok	Chojnice
17:30 CET (UTC+01:00)		Report	Hansen 23', 42'; Nguiamba 66'	Stadium: Stadion Miejski; Attendance: 2,900; Referee: Paweł Raczkowski (Warsaw)

30 October 2024	MKS Kluczbork	0–1	ŁKS Łódź	Kluczbork
18:00 CET (UTC+01:00)		Report	Feiertag 45'	Stadium: Stadion Miejski; Attendance: 970; Referee: Maciej Kuropatwa (Katowice)

30 October 2024	Wigry Suwałki	2–3	Polonia Warsaw	Suwałki
18:00 CET (UTC+01:00)	Berezynskyi 20'; Makuszewski 80'	Report	Kobusiński 24'; Durmuş 34'; Ozga 59' (o.g.)	Stadium: Stadion Miejski; Attendance: 864; Referee: Damian Krumplewski (Olsztyn)

30 October 2024	Unia Skierniewice	2–1	GKS Katowice	Skierniewice
19:00 CET (UTC+01:00)	Szmyd 41'; Sabiłło 45'	Report	Galán 59'	Stadium: Stadion Miejski; Attendance: 2,936; Referee: Jacek Małyszek (Lublin)

30 October 2024	Arka Gdynia	1–3 (a.e.t.)	Piast Gliwice	Gdynia
20:30 CET (UTC+01:00)	Skóra 57'	Report	Rosołek 60'; Szczepański 113'; Piasecki 118' (pen.)	Stadium: Gdynia Municipal Stadium; Attendance: 4,786; Referee: Grzegorz Kawałko (Olsztyn)

31 October 2024	Lechia Zielona Góra	3–3 (a.e.t.) (3–5 p)	Widzew Łódź	Zielona Góra
13:00 CET (UTC+01:00)	Lisowski 32' (pen.), 120+4' (pen.); Mycan 88'	Report	Hamulić 66'; Cybulski 69'; Sypek 115'	Stadium: Stadion Miejski; Attendance: 949; Referee: Sebastian Jarzębak (Bytom)
	Penalties
	Maćkowiak (penalty scored); Figiel (penalty scored); Zientarski (penalty scored); Mycan (penalty missed)		(penalty scored) Sobol; (penalty scored) Hanousek; (penalty scored) Łukowski; (penalty scored) Żyro; (penalty scored) Álvarez

31 October 2024	Warta Poznań	0–3	Zagłębie Lubin	Grodzisk Wielkopolski
17:30 CET (UTC+01:00)		Report	Grzybek 24'; Nalepa 72'; Jach 89'	Stadium: Dyskobolia Grodzisk Wielkopolski Stadium; Attendance: 753; Referee: Piotr Urban (Warsaw)

31 October 2024	Miedź Legnica	1–2	Legia Warsaw	Legnica
20:30 CET (UTC+01:00)	Letniowski 49'	Report	Kapustka 57' (pen.); Luquinhas 77'	Stadium: White Eagle Municipal Stadium; Attendance: 4,922; Referee: Jarosław Przybył (Kluczbork)

== Round of 16 ==
The draw for this round was conducted in the headquarter of Telewizja Polska on 4 November 2024. The matches were played from 3 to 5 December 2024. Participating in this round were the 16 winners from the previous round. Games were hosted by teams playing in a lower division in the 2024–25 season or by first drawn team in a case of match between clubs from the same division.

Number of teams per tier still in competition
2023–24 Ekstraklasa	2023–24 I liga	2023–24 II liga	2023–24 Regional cup winners	Total
11 / 18	2 / 18	2 / 18	1 / 16	16 / 70

Team 1	Score	Team 2
3 December 2024
Sandecja Nowy Sącz (4)	0–1	Puszcza Niepołomice (1)
Śląsk Wrocław (1)	1–1 (a.e.t.) (7–8 p)	Piast Gliwice (1)
Polonia Warsaw (2)	3–2 (a.e.t.)	Wisła Kraków (2)
4 December 2024
Korona Kielce (1)	1–0	Widzew Łódź (1)
Pogoń Szczecin (1)	4–3	Zagłębie Lubin (1)
Unia Skierniewice (4)	0–2	Ruch Chorzów (2)
5 December 2024
Olimpia Grudziądz (3)	1–3	Jagiellonia Białystok (1)
ŁKS Łódź (2)	0–3	Legia Warsaw (1)

3 December 2024	Sandecja Nowy Sącz	0–1	Puszcza Niepołomice	Nowy Sącz
12:00 CET (UTC+01:00)		Report	Cholewiak 9'	Stadium: Stadion im. Ojca Władysława Augustynka; Attendance: 0 Referee: Sebastian Krasny (Kraków)

3 December 2024	Śląsk Wrocław	1–1 (a.e.t.) (7–8 p)	Piast Gliwice	Wrocław
15:00 CET (UTC+01:00)	Samiec-Talar 86'	Report	Muñoz 25'	Stadium: Tarczyński Arena; Attendance: 4,459; Referee: Patryk Gryckiewicz (Toruń)
	Penalties
	Pokorný (penalty scored); Petkov (penalty scored); Żukowski (penalty scored); Băluță (penalty missed); Musiolik (penalty scored); Sharabura (penalty scored); Paluszek (penalty scored); Guercio (penalty scored); Gerstenstein (penalty missed)		(penalty scored) Katsantonis; (penalty missed) Szczepański; (penalty scored) Karbowy; (penalty scored) Mokwa; (penalty scored) Szymański; (penalty scored) Rosołek; (penalty scored) Muñoz; (penalty scored) Drapiński; (penalty scored) Czerwiński

3 December 2024	Polonia Warsaw	3–2 (a.e.t.)	Wisła Kraków	Warsaw
21:00 CET (UTC+01:00)	Durmuş 55', 56'; Poczobut 108'	Report	Duarte 6', 39'	Stadium: Stadion Miejski im. gen. Kazimierza Sosnkowskiego; Attendance: 2,244; Referee: Marcin Szczerbowicz (Olsztyn)

4 December 2024	Unia Skierniewice	0–2	Ruch Chorzów	Skierniewice
15:00 CET (UTC+01:00)		Report	Szwoch 34'; Barański 71'	Stadium: Stadion Miejski; Attendance: 3,000; Referee: Albert Różycki (Łódź)

4 December 2024	Korona Kielce	1–0	Widzew Łódź	Kielce
18:00 CET (UTC+01:00)	Remacle 57' (pen.)	Report		Stadium: Stadion Miejski; Attendance: 7,393; Referee: Karol Arys (Szczecin)

4 December 2024	Pogoń Szczecin	4–3	Zagłębie Lubin	Szczecin
21:00 CET (UTC+01:00)	Grosicki 19'; Bichakhchyan 24'; Gorgon 51'; Paryzek 88'	Report	Pieńko 44' (pen.); Kurminowski 62', 77'	Stadium: Stadion Miejski im. Floriana Krygiera; Attendance: 7,192; Referee: Jarosław Przybył (Kluczbork)

5 December 2024	Olimpia Grudziądz	1–3	Jagiellonia Białystok	Grudziądz
15:00 CET (UTC+01:00)	Kaczmarek 15' (pen.)	Report	Nené 21'; Pululu 22'; Imaz 30'	Stadium: Bronisław Malinowski Stadium; Attendance: 3,000; Referee: Damian Kos (Gdańsk)

5 December 2024	ŁKS Łódź	0–3	Legia Warsaw	Łódź
18:00 CET (UTC+01:00)		Report	Gual 48', 62'; Dankowski 57' (o.g.)	Stadium: Stadion Miejski im. Władysława Króla; Attendance: 8,951; Referee: Łukasz Kuźma (Białystok)

== Quarter-finals ==
The draw for this round was conducted in the headquarter of Telewizja Polska on 6 December 2024. The matches were played from 25 to 27 February 2025. Participating in this round were the 8 winners from the previous round. Games were hosted by teams playing in a lower division in the 2024–25 season or by first drawn team in a case of match between clubs from the same division.

Number of teams per tier still in competition
2023–24 Ekstraklasa	2023–24 I liga	2023–24 II liga	2023–24 Regional cup winners	Total
7 / 18	1 / 18	0 / 18	0 / 16	8 / 70

Team 1	Score	Team 2
25 February 2025
Ruch Chorzów (2)	2–0	Korona Kielce (1)
26 February 2025
Legia Warsaw (1)	3–1	Jagiellonia Białystok (1)
Pogoń Szczecin (1)	2–0 (a.e.t.)	Piast Gliwice (1)
27 February 2025
Polonia Warsaw (2)	1–2 (a.e.t.)	Puszcza Niepołomice (1)

25 February 2025	Ruch Chorzów	2–0	Korona Kielce	Chorzów
20:00 CET (UTC+01:00)	Tsykalo 14', 51'	Report		Stadium: Stadion Śląski; Attendance: 11,107; Referee: Damian Sylwestrzak (Wrocław)

26 February 2025	Pogoń Szczecin	2–0 (a.e.t.)	Piast Gliwice	Szczecin
18:00 CET (UTC+01:00)	Koulouris 106'; Grosicki 120+3'	Report		Stadium: Stadion Miejski im. Floriana Krygiera; Attendance: 15,942; Referee: Wojciech Myć (Lublin)

26 February 2025	Legia Warsaw	3–1	Jagiellonia Białystok	Warsaw
21:00 CET (UTC+01:00)	Ziółkowski 53'; Morishita 85', 90+9'	Report	Kubicki 30'	Stadium: Stadion Wojska Polskiego; Attendance: 23,816; Referee: Piotr Lasyk (Bytom)

27 February 2025	Polonia Warsaw	1–2 (a.e.t.)	Puszcza Niepołomice	Warsaw
18:00 CET (UTC+01:00)	Koton 49'	Report	Barkouski 63'; Szymonowicz 108'	Stadium: Stadion Miejski im. gen. Kazimierza Sosnkowskiego; Attendance: 2,233; Referee: Paweł Malec (Łódź)

== Semi-finals ==
The draw for this round was conducted in the headquarter of Telewizja Polska on 2 March 2025. The matches will be played on 1 and 2 April 2025. Participating in this round are the 4 winners from the previous round. Games will be hosted by teams playing in a lower division in the 2024–25 season or by first drawn team in a case of match between clubs from the same division.

Number of teams per tier still in competition
2023–24 Ekstraklasa	2023–24 I liga	2023–24 II liga	2023–24 Regional cup winners	Total
3 / 18	1 / 18	0 / 18	0 / 16	4 / 70

Team 1	Score	Team 2
1 April 2025
Puszcza Niepołomice (1)	0–3	Pogoń Szczecin (1)
2 April 2025
Ruch Chorzów (2)	0–5	Legia Warsaw (1)

1 April 2025	Puszcza Niepołomice	0–3	Pogoń Szczecin	Niepołomice
18:30 CEST (UTC+02:00)		Report	Koútris 5'; Wahlqvist 36'; Kouloúris 52'	Stadium: Stadion Miejski; Attendance: 2,000; Referee: Bartosz Frankowski (Toruń)

2 April 2025	Ruch Chorzów	0–5	Legia Warsaw	Chorzów
18:00 CEST (UTC+02:00)		Report	Chodyna 5'; Gual 28'; Wszołek 56'; Morishita 79'; Shkurin 84'	Stadium: Stadion Śląski; Attendance: 25,496; Referee: Damian Sylwestrzak (Wrocław)

== Final ==
2 May 2025
16:00 CEST (UTC+02:00)

Pogoń Szczecin	3–4	Legia Warsaw
Lončar 41'; Koulouris 67'; Smoliński 90+5'	90minut Łączy nas piłka	Luquinhas 13'; Morishita 46'; Shkurin 64'; Vinagre 85'

PGE Narodowy, Warsaw
Attendance: 51,233
Referee: Szymon Marciniak (Płock)
