= 2013–14 Polish Cup =

Puchar Polski
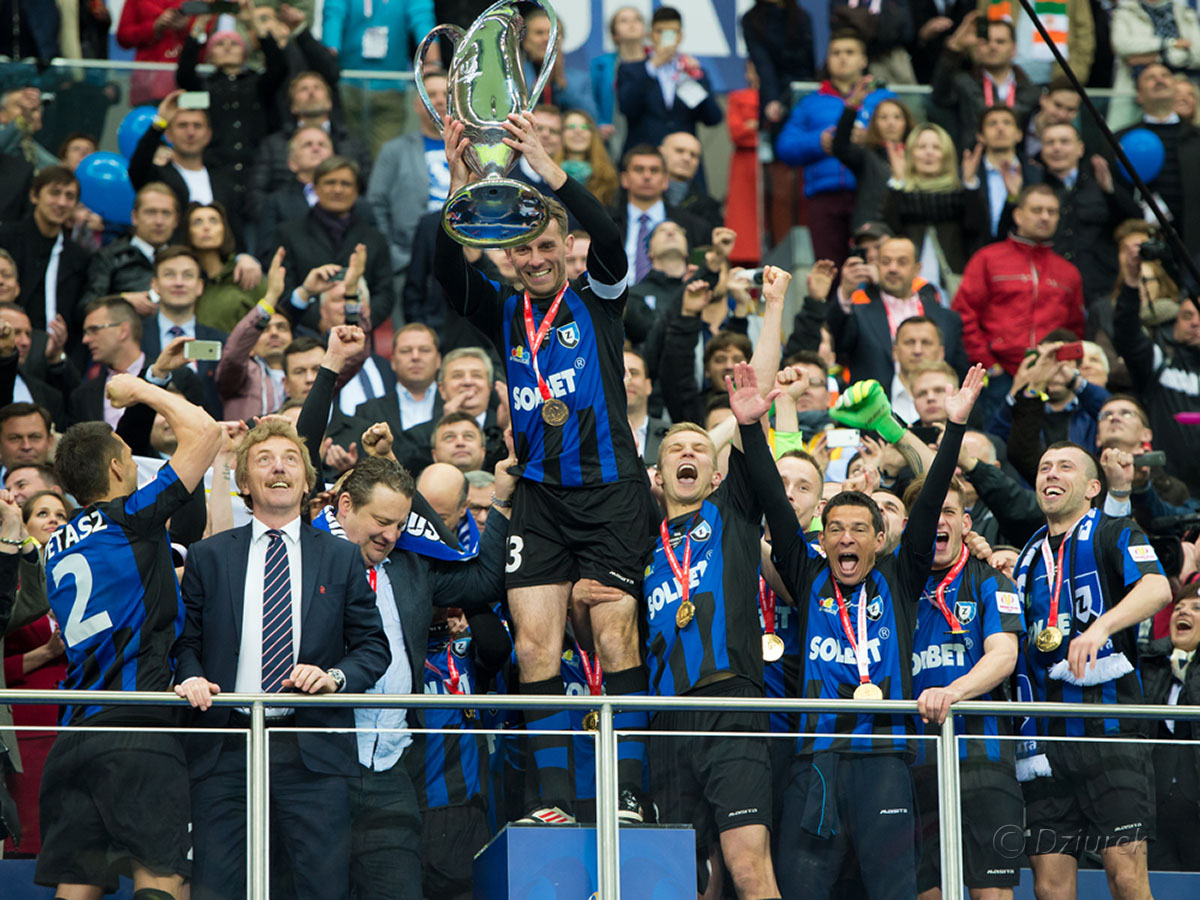

Tournament details
- Country: Poland
- Dates: 13 July 2013 – 2 May 2014
- Teams: 86

Final positions
- Champions: Zawisza Bydgoszcz
- Runners-up: Zagłębie Lubin

Tournament statistics
- Matches played: 91
- Goals scored: 318 (3.49 per match)
- Top goal scorer(s): Arkadiusz Piech (5 goals)

The 2013–14 Polish Cup was the 60th season of the annual Polish football knockout tournament. It began on 13 July 2013 with the first matches of the extra preliminary round and ended on 2 May 2014 with the Final. The winners qualified for the second qualifying round of the 2014–15 UEFA Europa League.

Legia Warsaw were the defending champions, having won their record breaking 16th title in the previous season. Zawisza Bydgoszcz won the match 6–5 on penalties following a 0–0 draw after extra time, thus winning the first Polish Cup trophy in the club's history.

== Participating teams ==
Enter in Round of 32	Enter in First Round	Enter in Extra Preliminary Round		
2012–13 Ekstraklasa; 16 teams	2012–13 I Liga; 18 teams	2012–13 II liga 36 teams		Winners of 16 regional cup competitions
Legia Warsaw^{1}; Lech Poznań^{1}; Śląsk Wrocław^{1}; Piast Gliwice^{1}; Górnik Zabrze; Polonia Warsaw; Wisła Kraków; Lechia Gdańsk; Zagłębie Lubin; Jagiellonia Białystok; Korona Kielce; Pogoń Szczecin; Widzew Łódź; Podbeskidzie Bielsko-Biała; Ruch Chorzów; GKS Bełchatów	Zawisza Bydgoszcz; KS Cracovia; Termalica Bruk-Bet Nieciecza; Flota Świnoujście; Arka Gdynia; GKS Tychy; Dolcan Ząbki; Miedź Legnica; Olimpia Grudziądz; GKS Katowice; Kolejarz Stróże; Górnik Łęczna; Stomil Olsztyn; Sandecja Nowy Sącz; Okocimski KS Brzesko; Warta Poznań; Polonia Bytom; ŁKS Łódź	Wisła Płock; Puszcza Niepołomice; Pelikan Łowicz; Resovia; Wisła Puławy; Znicz Pruszków; Olimpia Elbląg; Pogoń Siedlce; Radomiak Radom; Stal Stalowa Wola; Wigry Suwałki; Stal Rzeszów; Unia Tarnów; Motor Lublin; Garbarnia Kraków; Świt Nowy Dwór Mazowiecki; Concordia Elbląg; Siarka Tarnobrzeg	Energetyk ROW Rybnik; Chojniczanka Chojnice; Bytovia Bytów; Zagłębie Sosnowiec; MKS Kluczbork; KS Polkowice; Rozwój Katowice; Chrobry Głogów; Calisia Kalisz; Jarota Jarocin; Gryf Wejherowo; Raków Częstochowa; Tur Turek; Górnik Wałbrzych; Ruch Zdzieszowice; MKS Oława; Elana Toruń; Lech Rypin	Czarni II Rokitki (Lower Silesia); Włocłavia Włocławek (Kujawy-Pomerania); AMSPN Hetman Zamość (Lublin); Formacja Port 2000 Mostki (Lubusz); Lechia Tomaszów Mazowiecki (Łódź); ~~KS Tymbark~~^{2} (Lesser Poland); Ursus Warszawa (Mazovia); Odra Opole (Opole); Stal Sanok (Podkarpacie); ŁKS 1926 Łomża (Podlasie); Cartusia Kartuzy (Pomerania); Skra II Częstochowa (Silesia); KSZO Ostrowiec Świętokrzyski (Świętokrzyskie); GKS Wikielec (Warmia-Masuria); Sokół Kleczew (Greater Poland); Bałtyk Koszalin (West Pomerania)

Notes:

1. The top seeds can't meet prior to the semi-finals.
2. The winners of the Lesser Poland regional Cup were disqualified from 2013–14 Polish Cup, as the Lesser Poland FA were unable to determine the winner within the time limit set by the 2013–14 Polish Cup rulebook.

== Round and draw dates ==
Round	Draw date	First leg	Second leg
Extra preliminary round	14 June 2013	13 July 2013	—
Preliminary roud	14 June 2013	17 July 2013	—
First round	14 June 2013	24 July 2013	—
Round of 32	25 July 2013	16–17 August 2013	—
Round of 16	25 July 2013	16 October–18 December 2013	—
Quarter-finals	25 July 2013	18–19 March 2014	25–26 March 2014
Semi-finals	25 July 2013	8–9 April 2014	15–16 April 2014
Final	25 July 2013	21 May 2014 at National Stadium, Warsaw	—

== Extra preliminary round ==
The draw for this round was conducted at the headquarters of the Polish FA on 14 June 2013. Participating in this round are 16 regional cup winners and 36 teams from the 2012–13 II Liga. The matches will be played on 13 July 2013.

Team 1	Score	Team 2
9 July 2013
ASMPN Hetman Zamość (4)	1–0	MKS Oława (4)
13 July 2013
Cartusia Kartuzy (4)	0–0 (a.e.t.) (3–5 p)	Wigry Suwałki (3)
Lechia Tomaszów Mazowiecki (4)	2–1	MKS Kluczbork (3)
KS Tymbark (5)	0–3 (awarded)^{1}	Calisia Kalisz (3)
KSZO Ostrowiec Świętokrzyski (4)	0–2	Pelikan Łowicz (3)
ŁKS 1926 Łomża (4)	3–0 (awarded)^{2}	Radomiak Radom (3)
Formacja Port 2000 Mostki (4)	0–1	Raków Częstochowa (3)
Włocłavia Włocławek (4)	1–3	Chojniczanka Chojnice (2)
Elana Toruń (4)	0–1	Motor Lublin (3)
Ruch Zdzieszowice (3)	1–2	Siarka Tarnobrzeg (3)
Wisła Puławy (3)	1–3	Pogoń Siedlce (3)
Bytovia Bytów (3)	2–3	Gryf Wejherowo (3)
Ursus Warszawa (4)	2–0	Jarota Jarocin (3)
Sokół Kleczew (4)	1–0	Wisła Płock (2)
GKS Wikielec (5)	2–4	Garbarnia Kraków (3)
Skra II Częstochowa (7)	2–1	Górnik Wałbrzych (3)
Stal Sanok (4)	1–1 (a.e.t.) (0–2 p)	Puszcza Niepołomice (2)
Czarni II Rokitki (8)	2–4	Stal Stalowa Wola (3)
Odra Opole (3)	2–2 (a.e.t.) (4–2 p)	Energetyk ROW Rybnik (2)
Bałtyk Koszalin (4)	3–0 (awarded)^{2}	Resovia (4)
Lech Rypin (5)	3–0 (awarded)^{2}	Tur Turek (-)
Olimpia Elbląg (3)	1–4	Chrobry Głogów (3)
Znicz Pruszków (3)	3–0 (awarded)^{2}	Unia Tarnów (4)
Rozwój Katowice (3)	4–2 (a.e.t.)	Świt Nowy Dwór Mazowiecki (3)
Zagłębie Sosnowiec (3)	2–0	Concordia Elbląg (3)
14 July 2013
KS Polkowice (3)	2–0	Stal Rzeszów (3)

Notes

- Note 1: KS Tymbark were disqualified from the competition.
- Note 2: Radomiak, Resovia, Tur and Unia Tarnów withdrew from the competition.

== Preliminary round ==
The draw for this round was conducted at the headquarters of the Polish FA on 14 June 2013. The matches were played on 17 July 2013. Gryf Wejherowo and Zagłębie Sosnowiec received a bye to the First Round.

Team 1	Score	Team 2
17 July 2013
ASMPN Hetman Zamość (4)	1–1 (a.e.t.) (4–5 p)	Rozwój Katowice (3)
Wigry Suwałki (3)	1–0	Znicz Pruszków (3)
Lechia Tomaszów Mazowiecki (4)	2–1 (a.e.t.)	Chrobry Głogów (3)
Calisia Kalisz (3)	0–3	Lech Rypin (5)
Pelikan Łowicz (3)	3–2	Bałtyk Koszalin (4)
ŁKS 1926 Łomża (4)	2–3 (a.e.t.)	Odra Opole (3)
Stal Stalowa Wola (3)	2–0	Raków Częstochowa (3)
Puszcza Niepołomice (2)	2–0	Chojniczanka Chojnice (2)
Skra II Częstochowa (7)	1–0	Motor Lublin (3)
Garbarnia Kraków (3)	1–2^{1}	Siarka Tarnobrzeg (3)
Sokół Kleczew (4)	1–1 (a.e.t.) (0–3 p)	KS Polkowice (3)
Ursus Warszawa (4)	1–0	Pogoń Siedlce (3)

Notes

- Note 1: Played at Stadion Miejski, Tarnobrzeg, as Garbarnia's home stadium did not meet the PZPN criteria.

== First round ==
The draw for this round was conducted at the headquarters of the Polish FA on 24 June 2013. Participating in this round are the 12 winners of the preliminary round along with Gryf Wejherowo and Zagłębie Sosnowiec and the 18 teams from 2012–13 I Liga (Poland). The matches will be played on 23 and 24 July 2013.

Team 1	Score	Team 2
23 July 2013
Lech Rypin (5)	0–2	Zawisza Bydgoszcz (1)
ŁKS Łódź (5)	0–3 (awarded)^{1}	Termalica Bruk-Bet Nieciecza (2)
Pelikan Łowicz (3)	1–2	Arka Gdynia (2)
Siarka Tarnobrzeg (3)	2–0	Kolejarz Stróże (2)
Gryf Wejherowo (3)	2–0	Dolcan Ząbki (2)
Odra Opole (3)	0–4	Miedź Legnica (2)
24 July 2013
KS Polkowice (3)	0–3	Flota Świnoujście (2)
Lechia Tomaszów Mazowiecki (4)	1–2	GKS Tychy (2)
Puszcza Niepołomice (2)	2–0	Okocimski KS Brzesko (2)
Rozwój Katowice (3)	0–0 (a.e.t.) (4–2 p)	Stomil Olsztyn (2)
Stal Stalowa Wola (3)	1–0	KS Cracovia (1)
Ursus Warszawa (4)	1–0	Górnik Łęczna (2)
Polonia Bytom (3)	1–2	Sandecja Nowy Sącz (2)
Skra II Częstochowa (7)	0–2	Olimpia Grudziądz (2)
Wigry Suwałki (3)	0–2	GKS Katowice (2)
Zagłębie Sosnowiec (3)	4–1	Warta Poznań (3)

Notes

- Note 1: ŁKS Łódź withdrew from the competition.

== Bracket ==
Round of 32
Piast Gliwice	0
Zagłębie Lubin	0
Gryf Wejherowo	1
GKS Tychy	3
Sandecja Nowy Sącz	4
Flota Świnoujście	2
Ursus Warszawa	0
Widzew Łódź	1
Arka Gdynia	3
Ruch Chorzów	2
Polonia Warszawa	0
Korona Kielce	3 (awd)
Olimpia Grudziądz	0
Miedź Legnica	3
Nieciecza KS	0
Lech Poznań	4
Stal Stalowa Wola	1
Śląsk Wrocław	3
Puszcza Niepołomice	0
Jagiellonia Białystok	3
Zagłębie Sosnowiec	0
Wisła Kraków	4
Siarka Tarnobrzeg	0
Lechia Gdańsk	2
GKS Katowice	2
Podbeskidzie B.-B.	1
Pogoń Szczecin	1
Zawisza Bydgoszcz	3
GKS Bełchatów	0
Górnik Zabrze	2
Rozwój Katowice	0
Legia Warsaw	3

Round of 16
GKS Tychy	0
Zagłębie Lubin	1
Sandecja Nowy Sącz	2 (5)
Widzew Łódź	2 (4)
Arka Gdynia	5
Korona Kielce	1
Miedź Legnica	2
Lech Poznań	0
Śląsk Wrocław	0
Jagiellonia Białystok	1
Wisła Kraków	0
Lechia Gdańsk	1
GKS Katowice	0
Zawisza Bydgoszcz	1
Górnik Zabrze	3
Legia Warsaw	1

Quarterfinals
Zagłębie Lubin	2	5
Sandecja Nowy Sącz	0	0
Arka Gdynia	1	3
Miedź Legnica	1	2
Jagiellonia Białystok	2	1
Lechia Gdańsk	1	1
Zawisza Bydgoszcz	2	3
Górnik Zabrze	1	0

Semifinals
Zagłębie Lubin	3	0
Arka Gdynia	0	0
Jagiellonia Białystok	0	1
Zawisza Bydgoszcz	2	1

Final
Zagłębie Lubin	0 (5)
Zawisza Bydgoszcz	0 (6)

== Round of 32 ==
The draw for this round was conducted at Stadion Wojska Polskiego, Warsaw on 25 July 2013. Participating in this round are the 16 winners of the first round along with the 16 teams from 2012–13 Ekstraklasa. The matches were played on 16 and 17 August 2013.

Team 1	Score	Team 2
16 August 2013
GKS Katowice (2)	2–1 (a.e.t.)	Podbeskidzie Bielsko-Biała (1)
Zagłębie Sosnowiec (3)	0–4	Wisła Kraków (1)
17 August 2013
Polonia Warsaw (5)	0–3 (awarded)	Korona Kielce (1)
GKS Bełchatów (2)	0–2	Górnik Zabrze (1)
Stal Stalowa Wola (3)	1–3 (a.e.t.)	Śląsk Wrocław (1)
Siarka Tarnobrzeg (3)	0–2	Lechia Gdańsk (1)
Rozwój Katowice (3)	0–3	Legia Warsaw (1)
Gryf Wejherowo (3)	1–3	GKS Tychy (2)
Sandecja Nowy Sącz (2)	4–2	Flota Świnoujście (2)
Olimpia Grudziądz (2)	0–3	Miedź Legnica (2)
Pogoń Szczecin (1)	1–3	Zawisza Bydgoszcz (1)
18 August 2013
Termalica Bruk-Bet Nieciecza (2)	0–4	Lech Poznań (1)
Puszcza Niepołomice (2)	0–3	Jagiellonia Białystok (1)
Ursus Warszawa (4)	0–1	Widzew Łódź (1)
Arka Gdynia (2)	3–2 (a.e.t.)	Ruch Chorzów (1)
Piast Gliwice (1)	0–0 (a.e.t.) (4–5 p)	Zagłębie Lubin (1)

16 August 2013	GKS Katowice	2–1 (a.e.t.)	Podbeskidzie Bielsko-Biała	Katowice
18:30 CEST (UTC+02:00)	Duda 74' (pen.); Pitry 104'		Deja 78'	Stadium: Stadion GKS Katowice; Attendance: 2,200; Referee: Mariusz Złotek (Stalowa Wola)

16 August 2013	Zagłębie Sosnowiec	0–4	Wisła Kraków	Sosnowiec
18:30 CEST (UTC+02:00)			Chrapek 41'; Garguła 50', 54'; Brożek 81'	Stadium: Stadion Ludowy; Attendance: 5,000; Referee: Jarosław Przybył (Kluczbork)

17 August 2013	GKS Bełchatów	0–2	Górnik Zabrze	Bełchatów
14:30 CEST (UTC+02:00)			Sobolewski 54'; Skrzypczak 76'	Stadium: Stadion GKS; Attendance: 1,400; Referee: Jarosław Rynkiewicz (Zielona Góra)

17 August 2013	Stal Stalowa Wola	1–3 (a.e.t.)	Śląsk Wrocław	Stalowa Wola
15:30 CEST (UTC+02:00)	Bogacz 73'		Hołota 86'; Paixão 110'; Więzik 118'	Stadium: Stadion MOSiR; Attendance: 3,000; Referee: Wojciech Krztoń (Olsztyn)

17 August 2013	Siarka Tarnobrzeg	0–2	Lechia Gdańsk	Tarnobrzeg
15:30 CEST (UTC+02:00)			Makowski 49' (o.g.); Wiśniewski 61' (pen.)	Stadium: Stadion Miejski; Attendance: 3,000; Referee: Jacek Małyszek (Lublin)

17 August 2013	Rozwój Katowice	0–3	Legia Warsaw	Katowice
16:30 CEST (UTC+02:00)			Saganowski 16', 46'; Kosecki 39'	Stadium: Stadion Rozwoju; Attendance: 800; Referee: Sebastian Tarnowski (Wrocław)

17 August 2013	Gryf Wejherowo	1–3	GKS Tychy	Wejherowo
18:00 CEST (UTC+02:00)	Siemaszko 82'		Flis 51'; Smółka 67' (pen.); Szczęsny 85'	Stadium: Stadion WKS Gryf; Referee: Zbigniew Dobrynin (Łódź)

17 August 2013	Sandecja Nowy Sącz	4–2	Flota Świnoujście	Nowy Sącz
18:00 CEST (UTC+02:00)	Bębenek 5'; Czarnecki 38'; Szarek 54'; Mójta 78'		Arifović 15', 60'	Stadium: Stadion im. Ojca W. Augustynka; Referee: Sebastian Jarzębak (Bytom)

17 August 2013	Olimpia Grudziądz	0–3	Miedź Legnica	Grudziądz
18:00 CEST (UTC+02:00)			Grzegorzewski 32', 41', 48' (pen.)	Stadium: Stadion Centralny; Referee: Dawid Piasecki (Słupsk)

17 August 2013	Pogoń Szczecin	1–3	Zawisza Bydgoszcz	Szczecin
19:30 CEST (UTC+02:00)	Robak 27'		Vasconselos 2'; Petasz 11'; Masłowski 90'	Stadium: Stadion im. Floriana Krygiera; Referee: Tomasz Radkiewicz (Łódź)

18 August 2013	Termalica Bruk-Bet Nieciecza	0–4	Lech Poznań	Nieciecza
13:00 CEST (UTC+02:00)			Teodorczyk 63'; Ślusarski 65'; Pawłowski 78'; Drewniak 90+1'	Stadium: Stadion Niecieczy KS; Attendance: 2,244; Referee: Tomasz Kwiatkowski (Warsaw)

18 August 2013	Puszcza Niepołomice	0–3	Jagiellonia Białystok	Niepołomice
15:30 CEST (UTC+02:00)			Gajos 53'; Quintana 67' (pen.); Piątkowski 90'	Stadium: Stadion Miejski; Referee: Adam Lyczmański (Bydgoszcz)

18 August 2013	Ursus Warszawa	0–1	Widzew Łódź	Warsaw
17:30 CEST (UTC+02:00)			Višņakovs 3'	Stadium: Stadion KS Ursus; Attendance: 1,200; Referee: Paweł Dreschel (Gdańsk))

18 August 2013	Arka Gdynia	3–2 (a.e.t.)	Ruch Chorzów	Gdynia
18:30 CEST (UTC+02:00)	Marcus Vinicius 63'; Szubert 98'; Tomasik 112'		Brodziński 45'; Włodyka 96'	Stadium: Stadion GOSiR; Attendance: 4,303; Referee: Tomasz Garbowski (Kluczbork)

18 August 2013	Piast Gliwice	0–0 (a.e.t.) (4–5 p)	Zagłębie Lubin	Gliwice
20:30 CEST (UTC+02:00)				Stadium: Stadion Miejski; Referee: Krzysztof Jakubik (Siedlce)
	Penalties
	Podgórski (penalty scored); Wilczek (penalty scored); Jurado (penalty scored); Ižvolt (penalty missed); Matras (penalty scored); Lazdiņš (penalty missed)		Rymaniak (penalty missed); Piątek (penalty scored); Čotra (penalty scored); Woźniak (penalty scored); Kwiek (penalty scored); Vidanov (penalty scored)

== Round of 16 ==
Competing in this round are the 16 winners from the previous round. Matches were played on 16, 21, 22 & 23 October 2013, 5, 6 & 7 November 2013 & 18 December 2013. Numbers in brackets associate what tier of Polish football the club compete in. Katowice, Tychy, Arka Gdynia, Miedź Legnica & Sandecja Nowy Sącz are the five lowest ranked teams left in the competition, all competing in the second tier of Polish football.

Team 1	Score	Team 2
16 October 2013
GKS Katowice (2)	0–1	Zawisza Bydgoszcz (1)
21 October 2013
Śląsk Wrocław (1)	0–1	Jagiellonia Białystok (1)
22 October 2013
Wisła Kraków (1)	0–1	Lechia Gdańsk (1)
23 October 2013
GKS Tychy (2)	0−1	Zagłębie Lubin (1)
5 November 2013
Arka Gdynia (2)	5−1	Korona Kielce (1)
6 November 2013
Miedź Legnica (2)	2–0	Lech Poznań (1)
7 November 2013
Sandecja Nowy Sącz (2)	2–2 (a.e.t.) (5–4 p)	Widzew Łódź (1)
18 December 2013
Górnik Zabrze (1)	3−1	Legia Warsaw (1)

16 October 2013	GKS Katowice	0–1	Zawisza Bydgoszcz	Katowice
18:30 CEST (UTC+02:00)			Petasz 69'	Stadium: Stadion GKS Katowice; Attendance: 4,000; Referee: Jarosław Przybył (Kluczbork)

21 October 2013	Śląsk Wrocław	0–1	Jagiellonia Białystok	Wrocław
20:00 CEST (UTC+02:00)			Drażba 90+2'	Stadium: Stadion Miejski; Attendance: 13,533; Referee: Jarosław Rynkiewicz (Zielona Góra)

22 October 2013	Wisła Kraków	0–1	Lechia Gdańsk	Kraków
18:00 CEST (UTC+02:00)			Buzała 75'	Stadium: Stadion im. Henryka Reymana; Attendance: 5,331; Referee: Bartosz Frankowski (Toruń)

23 October 2013	GKS Tychy	0−1	Zagłębie Lubin	Jaworzno
13:00 CEST (UTC+02:00)			Piech 78'	Stadium: Stadion Miejski; Attendance: 250; Referee: Tomasz Radkiewicz (Łódź)

5 November 2013	Arka Gdynia	5−1	Korona Kielce	Gdynia
18:00 CET (UTC+01:00)	Rzuchowski 12', 90+3'; Jamróz 58'; Szwoch 73'; Tomasik 88'		Janiec 23'	Stadium: Stadion GOSiR; Attendance: 3,485; Referee: Łukasz Bednarek (Koszalin)

6 November 2013	Miedź Legnica	2–0	Lech Poznań	Legnica
18:00 CET (UTC+01:00)	Szczepaniak 75'; Henríquez 78' (o.g.)			Stadium: Stadion im. Orła Białego; Attendance: 5,500; Referee: Adam Lyczmański (Bydgoszcz)

7 November 2013	Sandecja Nowy Sącz	2–2 (a.e.t.) (5–4 p)	Widzew Łódź	Nowy Sącz
17:00 CET (UTC+01:00)	Mójta 40' (pen.); Grzeszczyk 73'		Kaczmarek 52'; E. Višņakovs 79'	Stadium: Stadion im. Ojca W. Augustynka; Attendance: 2,500; Referee: Sebastian Jarzębak (Bytom)
	Penalties
	Petrán (penalty scored); Náther (penalty scored); Grzeszczyk (penalty scored); Gorski (penalty scored); Mójta (penalty scored)		(penalty scored) E. Višņakovs; (penalty scored) A. Višņakovs; (penalty scored) Melunović; (penalty missed) Batrović; (penalty scored) Kaczmarek

18 December 2013	Górnik Zabrze	3−1	Legia Warsaw	Zabrze
19:00 CET (UTC+01:00)	Zachara 5'; Łuczak 60'; Oziębała 89'		Pinto 71'	Stadium: Stadion Ernest Pohl; Attendance: 3,000; Referee: Bartosz Frankowski (Toruń)

== Quarter-finals ==
The 8 winners from Round of 16 competed in this round.
The matches will be played in two legs. The first leg took place on 11, 12 and 19 March 2014, while the second legs were played on 25 and 26 March 2014.
Pairs were determined on 25 July 2013.

Team 1	Agg.	Team 2	1st leg	2nd leg
Zagłębie Lubin (1)	7–0	Sandecja Nowy Sącz (2)	2–0	5–0
Jagiellonia Białystok (1)	3–2	Lechia Gdańsk (1)	2–1	1–1
Zawisza Bydgoszcz (1)	5–1	Górnik Zabrze (1)	2–1	3–0
Arka Gdynia (2)	4–3	Miedź Legnica (2)	1–1	3–2 (a.e.t.)

=== First leg ===
11 March 2014	Zagłębie Lubin	2–0	Sandecja Nowy Sącz	Lubin
18:30 CET (UTC+01:00)	Kwiek 13' (pen.); Papadopulos 38'			Stadium: Stadion Zagłębia; Attendance: 2,879; Referee: Piotr Lasyk (Bytom)

12 March 2014	Jagiellonia Białystok	2–1	Lechia Gdańsk	Białystok
18:30 CET (UTC+01:00)	Ukah 25'; Bala 27'		Tuszyński 66'	Stadium: Stadion Miejski; Attendance: 4,034; Referee: Tomasz Musiał (Kraków)

18 March 2014	Zawisza Bydgoszcz	2−1	Górnik Zabrze	Bydgoszcz
18:30 CET (UTC+01:00)	Masłowski 40'; Petasz 70'		Majtán 21'	Stadium: Kompleks Sportowy Zawisza; Attendance: 500; Referee: Mariusz Złotek (Stalowa Wola)

19 March 2014	Arka Gdynia	1–1	Miedź Legnica	Gdynia
18:30 CET (UTC+01:00)	Vinícius 83'		Zakrzewski 18'	Stadium: Stadion GOSiR; Attendance: 4,367; Referee: Jarosław Rynkiewicz (Zielona Góra)

=== Second leg ===
25 March 2014	Miedź Legnica	2–3 (a.e.t.) (3–4 agg.)	Arka Gdynia	Legnica
18:30 CET (UTC+01:00)	Burkhardt 49'; Wołczek 120'		Szwoch 54' (pen.); Tomasik 100'; Aleksander 119'	Stadium: Stadion im. Orła Białego; Attendance: 4,600; Referee: Łukasz Bednarek (Koszalin)

25 March 2014	Lechia Gdańsk	1–1 (2–3 agg.)	Jagiellonia Białystok	Gdańsk
20:30 CET (UTC+01:00)	Frankowski 72'		Balaj 28'	Stadium: PGE Arena; Attendance: 9,579; Referee: Jarosław Rynkiewicz (Zielona Góra)

26 March 2014	Sandecja Nowy Sącz	0–5 (0–7 agg.)	Zagłębie Lubin	Nowy Sącz
18:00 CET (UTC+01:00)			Piech 12', 50'; Papadopulos 56'; Bertilsson 58', 69'	Stadium: Stadion im. Ojca W. Augustynka; Attendance: 2,500; Referee: Tomasz Radkiewicz (Łódź)

26 March 2014	Górnik Zabrze	0−3 (1–5 agg.)	Zawisza Bydgoszcz	Zabrze
19:45 CET (UTC+01:00)			Drygas 35', 69'; Iwan 52' (o.g.)	Stadium: Stadion Ernest Pohl; Attendance: 2,500; Referee: Tomasz Kwiatkowski (Warsaw)

== Semi-finals ==
The 4 winners from the quarterfinals competed in this round.
The matches will be played in two legs. The first leg took place on 8 & 9 April 2014, while the second legs were played on 16 April 2014.
Pairs were determined on 25 July 2013.

Team 1	Agg.	Team 2	1st leg	2nd leg
Zagłębie Lubin (1)	3–0	Arka Gdynia (2)	3–0	0–0
Jagiellonia Białystok (1)	1–3	Zawisza Bydgoszcz (1)	0–2	1–1

=== First leg ===
8 April 2014	Zagłębie Lubin	3–0	Arka Gdynia	Lubin
18:30 CEST (UTC+02:00)	Piech 15', 70'; Abwo 76'			Stadium: Stadion Zagłębia; Attendance: 3,257; Referee: Bartosz Frankowski (Toruń)

9 April 2014	Jagiellonia Białystok	0–2	Zawisza Bydgoszcz	Białystok
18:30 CEST (UTC+02:00)			Gevorgyan 5'; Drygas 65'	Stadium: Stadion Miejski; Attendance: 6,272; Referee: Paweł Gil (Lubin)

=== Second leg ===
15 April 2014	Zawisza Bydgoszcz	1−1 (3–1 agg.)	Jagiellonia Białystok	Bydgoszcz
18:30 CEST (UTC+02:00)	Kadú 87'		Dźwigała 22'	Stadium: Kompleks Sportowy Zawisza; Attendance: 1,000; Referee: Szymon Marciniak (Płock)

16 April 2014	Arka Gdynia	0–0 (3–0 agg.)	Zagłębie Lubin	Gdynia
18:30 CEST (UTC+02:00)				Stadium: Stadion GOSiR; Attendance: 3,709; Referee: Paweł Raczkowski (Warsaw)

== Final ==
2 May 2014
18:30 CEST (UTC+02:00)

Zagłębie Lubin	0–0 (a.e.t.)	Zawisza Bydgoszcz
Penalties
Bílek (penalty scored); Piech (penalty scored); Błąd (penalty scored); Čotra (penalty missed); Vidanov (penalty scored); Guldan (penalty scored); Bonecki (penalty missed)	5–6	(penalty missed) Dudek; (penalty scored) Drygas; (penalty scored) Kadú; (penalty scored) Álvarinho; (penalty scored) Gevorgyan; (penalty scored) Luís Carlos; (penalty scored) Lewczuk

Stadion Narodowy, Warsaw
Attendance: 37,120
Referee: Jarosław Przybył (Kluczbork)

== See also ==
- 2013–14 Ekstraklasa
