= 2024–25 GKS Górnik Łęczna season =

Górnik Łęczna
2024–25 season
- Manager: Pavol Staňo
- Stadium: Łęczna Stadium
- I liga: 3rd
- Polish Cup: First round
| Home colours | Away colours |

The 2024–25 season is the 46th season in the history of GKS Górnik Łęczna, and the club's third consecutive season in I liga. In addition to the domestic league, the team is scheduled to participate in the Polish Cup.

== Transfers ==
=== In ===
| Pos. | Player | Transferred from | Fee | Date | Source |
|---|---|---|---|---|---|
| FW | (Poland) Michał Litwa | (Poland) Górnik Polkowice | | 4 July 2024 | |
| DF | (Poland) Filip Szabaciuk | (Poland) Stomil Olsztyn | | 5 July 2024 | |
| MF | (Poland) Kamil Orlik | (Poland) Siarka Tarnobrzeg | | 10 July 2024 | |
| FW | (Poland) Hubert Turski | (Poland) Pogoń Szczecin | Loan | 19 July 2024 | |
| DF | (Niger) Ogaga Oduko | (Slovakia) FC Petržalka | Free | 25 July 2024 | |
| FW | (Spain) Solo Traoré | (Spain) Zamora CF | | 25 July 2024 | |

=== Out ===
| Pos. | Player | Transferred to | Fee | Date | Source |
|---|---|---|---|---|---|
| MF | (Turkey) İlkay Durmuş | (Poland) Polonia Warsaw | Undisclosed | 16 July 2024 | |

== Friendlies ==
=== Pre-season ===
| 26 June 2024 Friendly | Górnik Łęczna (Poland) | 2–1 | (Poland) Znicz Pruszków | Polkowice |
| 15:15 | Gąska 34'; Solo Traoré 72' | | Kacper Flisiuk 84' | Stadium: Stadion Górnik |

| 29 June 2024 Friendly | Górnik Łęczna (Poland) | 3–1 | (Poland) Pogoń Siedlce | Łęczna |
| 11:30 | Warchoł 29'; Janaszek 52'; Turski 108' | | Majewski 88' | Stadium: Łęczna Stadium; Attendance: 100; Referee: Jacek Małyszek |
Note: Two periods of 60 minutes

| 3 July 2024 Friendly | Górnik Łęczna (Poland) | 1–4 | (Israel) Hapoel Be'er Sheva |
| 17:00 |

| 6 July 2024 Friendly | Korona Kielce (Poland) | 6–1 | (Poland) Górnik Łęczna | Kielce |
| 11:00 | Shikavka 36'; Strzeboński 41'; Dalmau 67', 100', 113'; Bąk 84' | | Spacil 6' | Stadium: Kielce Stadium |
Note: Two periods of 60 minutes

| 12 July 2024 Friendly | Górnik Łęczna (Poland) | 1–1 | (Poland) Wieczysta Kraków |
| 15:45 | Turski 44' | | Swędrowski 50' |

| 22 July 2024 Friendly | Górnik Łęczna (Poland) | 1–2 | (Israel) Hapoel Hadera |
| 17:00 |

| 28 July 2024 Friendly | Górnik Łęczna (Poland) | 0–1 | (Poland) Chełmianka Chełm | Łęczna |
| 10:00 | | | | Stadium: Łęczna Stadium |

== Competitions ==
=== Overall record ===
| Competition | First match | Last match | Starting round | Record | | | | | | | |
| Competition | First match | Last match | Starting round | Pld | W | D | L | GF | GA | GD | Win % |
|---|---|---|---|---|---|---|---|---|---|---|---|
| I liga | 20 July 2024 | 25–26 May 2025 | Matchday 1 | 5 | 4 | 1 | 0 | 10 | 5 | +5 | 80.00 |
| Polish Cup | 24 September 2024 | | First round | 0 | 0 | 0 | 0 | 0 | 0 | +0 | — |
| Total | | | | 5 | 4 | 1 | 0 | 10 | 5 | +5 | 80.00 |

Last updated: 18 August 2024
Source: Soccerway

=== I liga ===
==== League table ====
| Pos | Team | Pld | W | D | L | GF | GA | GD | Pts |
|---|---|---|---|---|---|---|---|---|---|
| 7 | GKS Tychy | 34 | 13 | 14 | 7 | 47 | 36 | +11 | 53 |
| 8 | Znicz Pruszków | 34 | 14 | 10 | 10 | 52 | 43 | +9 | 52 |
| 9 | Górnik Łęczna | 34 | 13 | 11 | 10 | 50 | 42 | +8 | 50 |
| 10 | Ruch Chorzów | 34 | 13 | 9 | 12 | 50 | 46 | +4 | 48 |
| 11 | ŁKS Łódź | 34 | 13 | 8 | 13 | 50 | 41 | +9 | 47 |

Source: 1liga.org, 90minut.pl
Rules for classification: 1) Points; 2) Head-to-head points; 3) Head-to-head goal difference; 4) Goal difference; 6) Goals scored; 7) Number of wins; 8) Number of away wins.
(Note: Head-to-head record is used only after all the matches between the teams in question have been played)

Semi-finals; 29 May 2025
3 | Wisła Płock | 2
6 | Polonia Warsaw | 1
4 | Wisła Kraków | 0
5 | Miedź Legnica | 1

Final; 1 June 2025
3 | Wisła Płock | 2
5 | Miedź Legnica | 0

==== Results summary ====
| Overall | | | | | | | | Home | | | | | | Away | | | | | |
| Pld | W | D | L | GF | GA | GD | Pts | W | D | L | GF | GA | GD | W | D | L | GF | GA | GD |
|---|---|---|---|---|---|---|---|---|---|---|---|---|---|---|---|---|---|---|---|
| 5 | 4 | 1 | 0 | 10 | 5 | +5 | 13 | 2 | 0 | 0 | 5 | 2 | +3 | 2 | 1 | 0 | 5 | 3 | +2 |

Last updated: 18 August 2024.

==== Results by round ====
| Round | 1 | 2 | 3 | 4 |
|---|---|---|---|---|
| Ground | A | H | A | H |
| Result | W | W | D | W |
| Position | 4 | 2 | | |

Updated to match(es) played on 10 August 2024. Source:
A = Away; H = Home; W = Win; D = Draw; L = Loss

==== Matches ====
The match schedule was released on 12 June 2024.

| 20 July 2024 1 | Stal Stalowa Wola | 0–1 | Górnik Łęczna | Stalowa Wola |
| 19:35 UTC+2 | Soszyński (yellow card) 26'; Furtak (yellow card) 61' | | Warchoł 90+5'; Spáčil (yellow card) 90+7' | Stadium: Subcarpathian Football Center; Referee: Piotr Szypuła |

| 27 July 2024 2 | Górnik Łęczna | 2–1 | Stal Rzeszów | Łęczna |
| 17:00 UTC+2 | Banaszak 19'; Bednarczyk (yellow card) 22'; Pindroch (red card) 39'; Warchoł 84' | | Prokić (yellow card) 22'; Bała 50' | Stadium: Łęczna Stadium; Referee: Piotr Rzucidło |

| 5 August 2024 3 | ŁKS Łódź | 1–1 | Górnik Łęczna | Łódź |
| 20:30 | Majcenić (yellow card) 11'; Arasa Fort 50'; Louveau (red card) 56'; Mokrzycki (yellow card) 64'; Kupczak (yellow card) 77' | | Warchoł 89', (yellow card) 90+7' | Stadium: Władysław Król Stadium; Attendance: 6,421; Referee: Leszek Lewandowski |

| 10 August 2024 4 | Górnik Łęczna | 3–1 | Polonia Warsaw | Łęczna |
| 14:30 UTC+2 | | | | Stadium: Łęczna Stadium; Referee: Tomasz Wajda |

=== Polish Cup ===
| 24 September 2024 First round | Górnik Łęczna | v | Puszcza Niepołomice | Łęczna |
| 18:00 | | | | Stadium: Łęczna Stadium |
