= 2024–25 Puszcza Niepołomice season =

Puszcza Niepołomice
2024–25 season
- Manager: Tomasz Tulacz
- Stadium: Józef Piłsudski Stadium and Niepołomice Stadium
- Ekstraklasa: 18th
- Polish Cup: Semi-finals
Home colours	Away colours	Third colours

The 2024–25 season was the 102nd season in the history of Puszcza Niepołomice, and the club's second consecutive season in Ekstraklasa. In addition to the domestic league, the team participated in the Polish Cup.

== Transfers ==
=== In ===
Pos.	Player	Transferred from	Fee	Date	Source
DF	(Poland) Dawid Abramowicz	(Poland) Radomiak Radom	>200,000 zł	1 July 2024	
MF	(Croatia) Jakov Blagaić	(Bosnia and Herzegovina) Borac Banja Luka	Free	4 July 2024	
FW	(Greece) Michalis Kosidis	(Greece) AEK Athens B	Loan	23 July 2024	

=== Out ===
Pos.	Player	Transferred to	Fee	Date	Source
GK	(Bosnia and Herzegovina) Muris Mešanović	(Czech Republic) Dukla Prague	Undisclosed	1 July 2024	
MF	(Poland) Bartłomiej Poczobut	(Poland) Polonia Warsaw	Contract termination	8 July 2024	
GK	(Poland) Krzysztof Wróblewski	(Poland) Chrobry Głogów		10 July 2024	
MF	(Poland) Jakub Stec	(Poland) Skra Częstochowa	Loan	26 July 2024	
MF	(South Korea) Lee Jin-hyun	(South Korea) Ulsan HD	Undisclosed	1 January 2025	

== Friendlies ==
=== Pre-season ===
22 June 2024 Friendly	Ruch Chorzów (Poland)	0–1	(Poland) Puszcza Niepołomice	Chorzów
11:30			Thiago 73'	Stadium: Stadion Miejski

28 June 2024 Friendly	Wisła Kraków (Poland)	0–1	(Poland) Puszcza Niepołomice	Wola Chorzelowska
10:30			Barauskas 78'	Stadium: Hotel Rado

3 July 2024 Friendly	Raków Częstochowa (Poland)	1–1	(Poland) Puszcza Niepołomice	Arłamów
11:00	Walczak 56'		Cholewiak 3'	Stadium: Arłamów Arena

6 July 2024 Friendly	Puszcza Niepołomice (Poland)	1–1	(Poland) Polonia Bytom	Niepołomice
11:00	Siemaszko 71'		Gajda 33'	Stadium: Stadion Miejski

9 July 2024 Friendly	Puszcza Niepolomice (Poland)	0–0	(Poland) ŁKS Łódź	Wola Chorzelowska
11:30 UTC+3				Stadium: Hotel Rado

12 July 2024 Friendly	Bruk-Bet Termalica Nieciecza (Poland)	1–1	(Poland) Puszcza Niepołomice	Nieciecza
11:00	Trubeha 53'	Report	Stępień 5'	Stadium: Nieciecza Stadium

12 July 2024 Friendly	Puszcza Niepołomice (Poland)	2–1	(Poland) Podhale Nowy Targ	Niepołomice
15:00	Klisiewicz 4'; Mroziński 16'		36'	Stadium: Stadion Miejski

== Competitions ==
=== Overall record ===
Competition	First match	Last match	Starting round	Record							
Competition	First match	Last match	Starting round	Pld	W	D	L	GF	GA	GD	Win %
Ekstraklasa	19 July 2024	24–25 May 2025	Matchday 1	3	0	1	2	2	5	−3	0.00
Polish Cup				0	0	0	0	0	0	+0	—
Total				3	0	1	2	2	5	−3	0.00

Last updated: 2 August 2024
Source: Soccerway

=== Ekstraklasa ===
==== League table ====
Pos	Team	Pld	W	D	L	GF	GA	GD	Pts	Qualification or relegation
14	Lechia Gdańsk	34	10	7	17	44	59	−15	37	
15	Zagłębie Lubin	34	10	6	18	33	51	−18	36	
16	Stal Mielec (R)	34	7	10	17	39	56	−17	31	Relegation to I liga
17	Śląsk Wrocław (R)	34	6	12	16	38	53	−15	30	Relegation to I liga
18	Puszcza Niepołomice (R)	34	6	10	18	37	63	−26	28	Relegation to I liga

Source: ekstraklasa.org 90minut.pl
Rules for classification: 1) Points; 2) Head-to-head points; 3) Head-to-head goal difference; 4) Goal difference; 5) Goals scored; 6) Number of wins; 7) Number of away wins; 8) Lower number of points based on yellow and red cards (red card = 3 points, yellow card = 1 point, sending-off = 3 points - including 1 point for first yellow card); 9) Fairplay ranking; 10) Draw.
(Note: Head-to-head record is used only after all the matches between the teams in question have been played)
(R) Relegated

==== Results summary ====
Overall								Home						Away					
Pld	W	D	L	GF	GA	GD	Pts	W	D	L	GF	GA	GD	W	D	L	GF	GA	GD
3	0	1	2	2	5	−3	1	0	1	0	2	2	0	0	0	2	0	3	−3

Last updated: 2 August 2024.

==== Results by round ====
Round	1	2	3
Ground	A	H	A
Result	L	D	L
Position	14		

Updated to match(es) played on 2 August 2024. Source:
A = Away; H = Home; W = Win; D = Draw; L = Loss

==== Matches ====
19 July 2024 1	Jagiellonia Białystok	2–0	Puszcza Niepołomice	Białystok
18:00	Skrzypczak (yellow card) 55'; Nené 78'; Diaby-Fadiga (yellow card) 87', (goal) 90+8'; Abramowicz (yellow card) 90+5'		Abramowicz (yellow card) 41'; Crăciun (yellow card) 76'; Stępień (yellow card) 83'	Stadium: Białystok Stadium; Attendance: 17,157; Referee: Damian Kos

26 July 2024 2	Puszcza Niepołomice	2–2	Górnik Zabrze	Kraków
18:00	Kosidis 52'; Serafin 60'		Sánchez 11'; Rasak 56'	Stadium: Józef Piłsudski Stadium; Referee: Daniel Stefański

2 August 2024 3	Zagłębie Lubin	1–0	Puszcza Niepołomice	Lubin
18:00	Orlikowski 53'			Stadium: Lubin Stadium; Referee: Patryk Gryckiewicz

11 August 2024 4	Puszcza Niepołomice	2–2	Legia Warsaw	Kraków
17:30				Stadium: Józef Piłsudski Stadium

16 August 2024 5	Puszcza Niepołomice	4–1	Lechia Gdańsk	Kraków
18:00				Stadium: Józef Piłsudski Stadium

24 August 2024 6	Motor Lublin	0–0	Puszcza Niepołomice	Lublin

31 August 2024 7	Puszcza Niepołomice	0–0	Korona Kielce	Kraków
				Stadium: Józef Piłsudski Stadium

15 September 2024 8	Piast Gliwice	1–1	Puszcza Niepołomice	Gliwice
12:15				Stadium: Piotr Wieczorek Municipal Stadium; Attendance: 5,779

21 September 2024 9	Puszcza Niepołomice	1–2	Cracovia	Kraków
12:15				Stadium: Józef Piłsudski Stadium; Attendance: 4,095; Referee: Sebastian Krasny

28 September 2024 10	Raków Częstochowa	2–0	Puszcza Niepołomice	Częstochowa
14:45				Stadium: Raków Municipal Stadium

4 October 2024 11	Puszcza Niepołomice	v	GKS Katowice	Kraków
18:00				Stadium: Józef Piłsudski Stadium
