= Igor Pieprzyca =

Polish footballer (born 2008)

Personal information
- Full name: Igor Franciszek Pieprzyca
- Date of birth: 8 October 2008 (age 18)
- Place of birth: Niepołomice, Poland
- Height: 1.80 m (5 ft 11 in)
- Position: Midfielder

Team information
- Current team: Puszcza Niepołomice
- Number: 28

Youth career
- 2015–2018: UKS Kazimierz
- 2018–2023: Puszcza Niepołomice

Senior career*
Years	Team	Apps	(Gls)
2023–	Puszcza Niepołomice	10	(0)

International career^{‡}
2024–2025	Poland U17	5	(0)
- * Club domestic league appearances and goals as of 20:40, 26 May 2026 (UTC) ‡ National team caps and goals as of 22:20, 10 February 2025 (UTC)

Igor Franciszek Pieprzyca (born 8 October 2008) is a Polish professional footballer who plays as a midfielder for I liga club Puszcza Niepołomice.

== Career ==
A youth product of UKS Kazimierz, Pieprzyca moved to the youth academy of Puszcza Niepołomice in 2018. He made his senior and professional debut with Puszcza Niepołomice as a late substitute in a 5–3 Ekstraklasa loss to Korona Kielce on 27 October 2023. At 15 years and 19 days old, Pieprzyca is the youngest player in Ekstraklasa history, taking the record from Janusz Sroka.

== Personal life ==
Pieprzyca is the son of the president of his club Puszcza Niepołomice, Jarosław Pieprzyca. In June 2025, Pieprzyca caused an accident by driving a car into the side of a neighbor's house; 16-years-old at the time of the incident, he was under the influence of alcohol and without a driver's license.

== Career statistics ==
As of match played 24 May 2026

Appearances and goals by club, season and competition
Club	Season	League			Polish Cup		Europe		Other		Total	
Club	Season	Division	Apps	Goals	Apps	Goals	Apps	Goals	Apps	Goals	Apps	Goals
Puszcza Niepołomice	2023–24	Ekstraklasa	2	0	0	0	—		—		2	0
Puszcza Niepołomice	2024–25	Ekstraklasa	2	0	0	0	—		—		2	0
Puszcza Niepołomice	2025–26	I liga	6	0	0	0	—		—		6	0
Career total			10	0	0	0	0	0	0	0	10	0
