= Bębenek =

Bębenek, less commonly Bembenek or Benbenek, is a Polish surname. Bembenek and Benbenek are non-standard spellings of Bębenek.

- Maciej Bębenek (born 1984), Polish footballer
- Laurie Bembenek (1958–2010), American convict

== See also ==
- Ę
