= Tomasz Tułacz =

Polish footballer (born 1969)

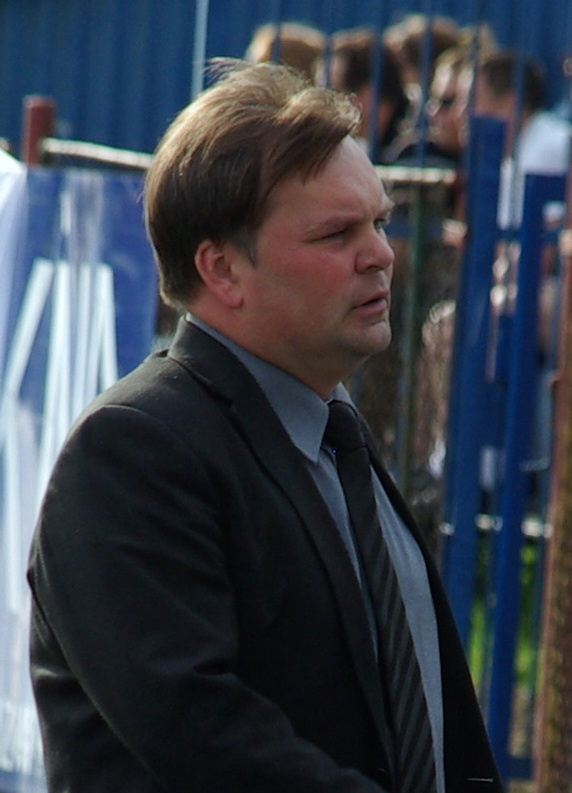
- Tułacz in 2011 as manager of Stal Mielec

Personal information
- Date of birth: 29 December 1969 (age 56)
- Place of birth: Mielec, Poland
- Height: 1.70 m (5 ft 7 in)
- Position: Midfielder

Team information
- Current team: Puszcza Niepołomice (manager)

Senior career*
Years	Team	Apps	(Gls)
1988–1992	Stal Mielec	87	(8)
1992–1993	Stal Stalowa Wola		
1994	Stal Mielec	39	(3)
1995	Stal Rzeszów		
1995–1996	Kamax Kańczuga		
1996–1997	Stal Mielec		
1997–2004	Tłoki Gorzyce		

Managerial career
- 2004–2005: Tłoki Gorzyce
- 2006: Stal Mielec
- 2007–2009: Resovia
- 2011–2012: Stal Mielec
- 2012–2013: Resovia
- 2013–2014: Siarka Tarnobrzeg
- 2015–: Puszcza Niepołomice
- * Club domestic league appearances and goals

Tomasz Tułacz (born 29 December 1969) is a Polish professional football manager and former player, who is the current manager of I liga club Puszcza Niepołomice.

== Career ==
From 1988 to 1994 he was a Stal Mielec's player in Ekstraklasa, with a seasonal spell at Stal Stalowa Wola, which played in the lower league. He ended his football career with Tłoki Gorzyce in 2004.

He has been the coach of Puszcza Niepołomice since 13 August 2015. During his tenure, he led the team to two promotions, the first of which came at the end of 2016–17 campaign, after finishing 3rd in the II liga. On 11 June 2023, Puszcza defeated Bruk-Bet Termalica Nieciecza in the 2022–23 I liga play-off final and achieved their first-ever promotion to Ekstraklasa.

== Personal life ==
His son Kamil was also a footballer who spent his career playing for Stal Mielec.

== Managerial statistics ==
As of match played 20 November 2026

Managerial record by team and tenure
Team	From	To	Record							
Team	From	To	G	W	D	L	GF	GA	GD	Win %
Tłoki Gorzyce	22 June 2004	19 April 2005	28	13	8	7	43	35	+8	46.43
Stal Mielec	24 April 2006	30 June 2006	13	4	2	7	9	14	−5	30.77
Resovia	30 November 2007	30 June 2009	61	37	14	10	129	44	+85	60.66
Stal Mielec	8 January 2011	14 February 2012	36	13	7	16	44	36	+8	36.11
Resovia	27 June 2012	30 June 2013	35	17	9	9	42	30	+12	48.57
Siarka Tarnobrzeg	1 July 2013	2 September 2014	47	26	8	13	74	50	+24	55.32
Puszcza Niepołomice	13 August 2015	Present	420	151	119	150	510	513	−3	35.95
Total			640	261	167	212	851	722	+129	40.78

== Honours ==
=== Manager ===
Resovia

- III liga Lublin-Subcarpathia: 2008–09
- Polish Cup (Subcarpathia regionals): 2008–09
- Polish Cup (Rzeszów-Dębica regionals): 2007–08, 2008–09

Individual

- Ekstraklasa Coach of the Month: December 2023
- I liga Coach of the Month: February & March 2026
