= Adam Deja =

Polish footballer

Personal information
- Full name: Adam Deja
- Date of birth: 24 June 1993 (age 33)
- Place of birth: Olesno, Poland
- Height: 1.85 m (6 ft 1 in)
- Position: Midfielder

Team information
- Current team: Górnik Łęczna
- Number: 10

Youth career
- Stobrawa Wachowice
- 2008–2010: OKS Olesno
- 2011: Górnik Zabrze

Senior career*
Years	Team	Apps	(Gls)
2009–2011	OKS Olesno		
2011–2012	MKS Kluczbork	42	(1)
2013–2017	Podbeskidzie	99	(1)
2013–2016	Podbeskidzie II	15	(3)
2017–2018	Cracovia	14	(0)
2018–2022	Arka Gdynia	104	(12)
2022–2023	Korona Kielce	19	(0)
2023	Korona Kielce II	1	(1)
2023–	Górnik Łęczna	92	(4)
- * Club domestic league appearances and goals as of 16:11, 26 May 2026 (UTC)

Adam Deja (born 24 June 1993) is a Polish professional footballer who plays as a midfielder for II liga club Górnik Łęczna.

== Career statistics ==
As of match played 24 May 2026

Appearances and goals by club, season and competition
Club	Season	League			Polish Cup		Europe		Other		Total	
Club	Season	Division	Apps	Goals	Apps	Goals	Apps	Goals	Apps	Goals	Apps	Goals
MKS Kluczbork	2011–12	II liga West	26	0	1	1	—		—		27	1
MKS Kluczbork	2012–13	II liga West	16	1	1	0	—		—		17	1
MKS Kluczbork	Total		42	1	2	1	—		—		44	2
Podbeskidzie Bielsko-Biała	2012–13	Ekstraklasa	10	0	—		—		—		10	0
Podbeskidzie Bielsko-Biała	2013–14	Ekstraklasa	17	0	1	0	—		—		18	0
Podbeskidzie Bielsko-Biała	2014–15	Ekstraklasa	21	0	4	0	—		—		25	0
Podbeskidzie Bielsko-Biała	2015–16	Ekstraklasa	25	1	1	0	—		—		26	1
Podbeskidzie Bielsko-Biała	2016–17	I liga	26	0	1	0	—		—		27	0
Podbeskidzie Bielsko-Biała	Total		99	1	7	0	—		—		106	1
Podbeskidzie II	2013–14	III liga, gr. F	9	3	—		—		—		9	3
Podbeskidzie II	2014–15	III liga, gr. F	5	0	—		—		—		5	0
Podbeskidzie II	2015–16	III liga, gr. F	1	0	—		—		—		1	0
Podbeskidzie II	Total		15	3	—		—		—		15	3
Cracovia	2017–18	Ekstraklasa	14	0	2	1	—		—		16	1
Arka Gdynia	2017–18	Ekstraklasa	27	2	2	0	—		—		29	2
Arka Gdynia	2019–20	Ekstraklasa	21	1	0	0	—		—		21	1
Arka Gdynia	2020–21	I liga	28	5	4	1	—		1 (Note: Appearance in I liga promotion play-offs)	0	33	6
Arka Gdynia	2021–22	I liga	26	4	2	0	—		1	0	29	4
Arka Gdynia	Total		102	12	8	1	—		2	0	112	13
Korona Kielce	2022–23	Ekstraklasa	19	0	1	0	—		—		20	0
Korona Kielce II	2022–23	III liga, gr. IV	1	1	—		—		—		1	1
Górnik Łęczna	2023–24	I liga	30	2	1	1	—		1	0	32	3
Górnik Łęczna	2024–25	I liga	32	2	1	0	—		—		33	2
Górnik Łęczna	2025–26	I liga	29	3	1	0	—		—		30	3
Górnik Łęczna	Total		91	7	3	1	—		1	0	95	8
Career total			383	25	23	4	0	0	3	0	409	29
