= Łukasz Bogusławski =

Polish footballer (born 1993)

Personal information
- Date of birth: 11 February 1993 (age 33)
- Place of birth: Augustów, Poland
- Height: 1.89 m (6 ft 2 in)
- Position: Centre-back

Team information
- Current team: Barycz Sułów
- Number: 93

Youth career
- MOSiR Grajewo
- Jagiellonia Białystok

Senior career*
Years	Team	Apps	(Gls)
2010–2011	Jagiellonia Białystok	0	(0)
2011–2013	Legia Warsaw II	13	(0)
2013–2014	Widzew Łódź II	9	(0)
2014–2016	Chrobry Głogów	50	(1)
2016–2017	Górnik Łęczna	14	(0)
2017	→ Zagłębie Sosnowiec (loan)	14	(0)
2017–2019	GKS Tychy	35	(2)
2019–2020	Olimpia Grudziądz	25	(1)
2020–2022	Wigry Suwałki	34	(2)
2022–2023	Znicz Pruszków	21	(0)
2023–2024	Radunia Stężyca	28	(1)
2024	Olimpia Elbląg	7	(0)
2024–	Barycz Sułów	50	(8)

International career
2008	Poland U16	2	(0)
2009	Poland U17	2	(0)
2010	Poland U18	1	(0)
- * Club domestic league appearances and goals as of 08:56, 26 June 2026 (UTC)

Łukasz Bogusławski (born 11 February 1993) is a Polish professional footballer who plays as a centre-back for III liga club Barycz Sułów.

== Career ==
=== Olimpia Grudziądz ===
On 29 August 2019, Olimpia Grudziądz announced that Bogusławski had joined on a contract until the summer of 2020, with an option for another year.

=== Wigry Suwałki ===
On 11 September 2020, he signed with Wigry Suwałki.

=== Znicz Pruszków ===
Following Wigry's withdrawal from II liga, on 25 June 2022 Bogusławski joined Znicz Pruszków on a one-year contract.

=== Radunia Stężyca ===
On 18 June 2023, Bogusławski signed a one-year deal with II liga side Radunia Stężyca. He left the club by mutual consent on 21 June 2024.

=== Olimpia Elbląg ===
On 5 July 2024, Bogusławski joined another third-tier club Olimpia Elbląg. He made eight appearances across all competitions for Olimpia, including seven starts, before amicably parting ways with the club on 5 September 2024.

=== Barycz Sułów ===
The following day, fifth division club Barycz Sułów announced the signing of Bogusławski.

== Honours ==
Barycz Sułów

- IV liga Lower Silesia: 2025–26
- Polish Cup (Wrocław regionals): 2024–25
