= Jorge Kadú =

Cape Verdean footballer (born 1991)

Personal information
- Full name: Jorge Paulo Lima Alves
- Date of birth: 10 April 1991 (age 35)
- Place of birth: Mindelo, Cape Verde
- Height: 1.74 m (5 ft 8 1/2 in)
- Position: Forward

Youth career
- 1999–2005: Académica do Mindelo

Senior career*
Years	Team	Apps	(Gls)
2011–2012	Operário	8	(0)
2012–2013	Sintrense	9	(1)
2013–2014	Quarteirense	32	(14)
2014	Zawisza Bydgoszcz	26	(5)
2015	Miedź Legnica	9	(2)
2015–2018	Académica Lobito	31	(11)
- * Club domestic league appearances and goals

Jorge Paulo Lima Alves (born 10 April 1991), known as Kadú, is a Cape Verdean former professional footballer who played as a forward.

== Honours ==
Zawisza Bydgoszcz

- Polish Cup: 2013–14
- Polish Super Cup: 2014
