= Michał Ozga =

Polish footballer

Personal information
- Full name: Michał Ozga
- Date of birth: 23 June 2000 (age 26)
- Place of birth: Kraków, Poland
- Height: 1.82 m (6 ft 0 in)
- Positions: Centre-back; defensive midfielder

Team information
- Current team: Chemik Bydgoszcz

Youth career
- Hutnik Nowa Huta
- 2012–2017: Progres Kraków
- 2017–2018: Jagiellonia Białystok

Senior career*
Years	Team	Apps	(Gls)
2018–2024	Jagiellonia Białystok	1	(0)
2019–2022	→ Wigry Suwałki (loan)	63	(1)
2022–2024	Jagiellonia Białystok II	37	(2)
2024–2026	Wigry Suwałki	60	(5)
2026–	Chemik Bydgoszcz	0	(0)

International career
2017–2018	Poland U18	4	(0)
2018	Poland U19	2	(0)
2019	Poland U20	2	(0)
- * Club domestic league appearances and goals as of 23:31, 3 June 2026 (UTC)

Michał Ozga (born 23 June 2000) is a Polish professional footballer who plays as a centre-back or defensive midfielder for III liga club Chemik Bydgoszcz.

== Honours ==
Jagiellonia Białystok II

- Polish Cup (Podlasie regionals): 2022–23

Wigry Suwałki

- Polish Cup (Podlasie regionals): 2025–26
