= Andrzej Trubeha =

Polish professional footballer (born 1997)

Personal information
- Full name: Andrzej Trubeha
- Date of birth: 22 November 1997 (age 28)
- Place of birth: Yavoriv, Ukraine
- Height: 1.86 m (6 ft 1 in)
- Position: Forward

Team information
- Current team: Puszcza Niepołomice
- Number: 53

Youth career
- –2012: JKS 1909 Jarosław
- 2012–2014: Stal Rzeszów

Senior career*
Years	Team	Apps	(Gls)
2014–2015	Stal Rzeszów II		
2015–2016	Stal Rzeszów	0	(0)
2016–2017	Górnik Zabrze II	35	(10)
2017–2019	Stal Stalowa Wola	40	(6)
2019–2020	KKS 1925 Kalisz	12	(3)
2020–2021	Legionovia Legionowo	44	(23)
2021–2023	Jagiellonia Białystok	31	(1)
2022	Jagiellonia Białystok II	4	(2)
2023–2026	Bruk-Bet Termalica Nieciecza	88	(14)
2026–	Puszcza Niepołomice	7	(1)
- * Club domestic league appearances and goals as of 13 September 2026

Andrzej Trubeha (born 22 November 1997) is a Ukrainian-born Polish professional footballer who plays as a forward for I liga club Puszcza Niepołomice.

== Career ==
A youth academy player for JKS 1909 Jarosław and Stal Rzeszów, he played in his senior career for Stal Rzeszów, Górnik Zabrze's second team, Stal Stalowa Wola, KKS 1925 Kalisz, Legionovia Legionowo, and Jagiellonia Białystok.

== Personal life ==
Trubeha was on born 22 November 1997 in Yavoriv, Ukraine. Until 2014, he held Ukrainian citizenship.

== Honours ==
Górnik Zabrze II

- Polish Cup (Zabrze regionals): 2015–16, 2016–17
