= Hubert Turski =

Polish footballer

Personal information
- Date of birth: 31 January 2003 (age 23)
- Place of birth: Szczecin, Poland
- Height: 1.92 m (6 ft 4 in)
- Position: Forward

Team information
- Current team: Pogoń Grodzisk Mazowiecki
- Number: 19

Youth career
- Unia Dolice
- 2014–2018: Pogoń Szczecin

Senior career*
Years	Team	Apps	(Gls)
2018–2025	Pogoń Szczecin II	51	(27)
2020–2025	Pogoń Szczecin	9	(0)
2021–2022	→ Chrobry Głogów (loan)	14	(1)
2024	→ Arka Gdynia (loan)	10	(1)
2024	→ Górnik Łęczna (loan)	6	(0)
2025–2026	Flota Świnoujście	34	(16)
2026–	Pogoń Grodzisk Mazowiecki	0	(0)

International career
2018	Poland U15	6	(8)
2019	Poland U16	1	(0)
2018–2019	Poland U17	7	(2)
2020–2021	Poland U19	2	(0)
2021	Poland U20	1	(0)
- * Club domestic league appearances and goals as of 22:36, 31 May 2026 (UTC)

Hubert Turski (born 31 January 2003) is a Polish professional footballer who plays as a forward for I liga club Pogoń Grodzisk Mazowiecki.

== Career statistics ==
As of match played 30 May 2026

Appearances and goals by club, season and competition
Club	Season	League			Polish Cup		Continental		Other		Total	
Club	Season	Division	Apps	Goals	Apps	Goals	Apps	Goals	Apps	Goals	Apps	Goals
Pogoń Szczecin II	2018–19	III liga, gr. II	9	8	—		—		—		9	8
Pogoń Szczecin II	2019–20	III liga, gr. II	3	0	—		—		—		3	0
Pogoń Szczecin II	2020–21	III liga, gr. II	12	5	—		—		—		12	5
Pogoń Szczecin II	2021–22	III liga, gr. II	2	2	—		—		—		2	2
Pogoń Szczecin II	2022–23	III liga, gr. II	2	0	0	0	—		—		2	0
Pogoń Szczecin II	2023–24	III liga, gr. II	8	5	0	0	—		—		8	5
Pogoń Szczecin II	2024–25	III liga, gr. II	15	7	—		—		—		15	7
Pogoń Szczecin II	Total		51	27	0	0	—		—		51	27
Pogoń Szczecin	2019–20	Ekstraklasa	8	0	0	0	—		—		8	0
Pogoń Szczecin	2020–21	Ekstraklasa	1	0	1	0	—		—		2	0
Pogoń Szczecin	Total		9	0	1	0	—		—		10	0
Chrobry Głogów (loan)	2021–22	I liga	14	1	1	0	—		—		15	1
Arka Gdynia (loan)	2023–24	I liga	9	1	—		—		1 (Note: Appearance in I liga promotion play-offs)	0	10	1
Górnik Łęczna (loan)	2024–25	I liga	6	0	1	0	—		—		7	0
Flota Świnoujście	2025–26	III liga, gr. II	34	16	2	1	—		—		36	17
Pogoń Grodzisk Mazowiecki	2026–27	I liga	0	0	0	0	—		—		0	0
Career total			123	45	5	1	0	0	1	0	129	46

== Honours ==
Pogoń Szczecin II

- Polish Cup (West Pomerania regionals): 2022–23

Individual

- III liga, group II top scorer: 2025–26
