= Branislav Pindroch =

Slovak footballer

Personal information
- Full name: Branislav Pindroch
- Date of birth: 30 October 1991 (age 35)
- Place of birth: Banská Bystrica, Czechoslovakia
- Height: 1.94 m (6 ft 4 1/2 in)
- Position: Goalkeeper

Team information
- Current team: Komárno
- Number: 32

Youth career
- Dukla Banská Bystrica

Senior career*
Years	Team	Apps	(Gls)
2010–2013	Dukla Banská Bystrica	9	(0)
2013–2017	Karviná	73	(0)
2017–2019	Notts County	1	(0)
2019	Nitra	10	(0)
2019–2020	ViOn Zlaté Moravce	25	(0)
2020–2021	Raków Częstochowa	2	(0)
2021–2024	Resovia	77	(0)
2024–2026	Górnik Łęczna	44	(0)
2026–	Komárno	7	(0)
- * Club domestic league appearances and goals as of 22 September 2026

Branislav Pindroch (born 30 October 1991) is a Slovak professional footballer who plays as a goalkeeper for Slovak First Football League club Komárno.

== Club career ==
He was offered new contract by Notts County at the end of the 2017–18 season. He was released from his contract by Notts County in January 2019.

After his return from the United Kingdom, he had played for top division Slovak clubs Nitra and ViOn Zlaté Moravce.

== Career statistics ==
As of match played 7 December 2025

Appearances and goals by club, season and competition
Club	Season	League			National cup (Note: Includes Czech Cup, Slovak Cup, Polish Cup)		League cup		Other		Total	
Club	Season	Division	Apps	Goals	Apps	Goals	Apps	Goals	Apps	Goals	Apps	Goals
Dukla Banská Bystrica	2010–11	Slovak Super Liga	9	0	0	0	—		0	0	9	0
Dukla Banská Bystrica	2011–12	Slovak Super Liga	0	0	0	0	—		—		0	0
Dukla Banská Bystrica	2012–13	Slovak Super Liga	0	0	0	0	—		—		0	0
Dukla Banská Bystrica	Total		9	0	0	0	—		0	0	9	0
Karviná	2012–13	CNFL	1	0	—		—		—		1	0
Karviná	2013–14	CNFL	26	0	2	0	—		—		28	0
Karviná	2014–15	CNFL	17	0	0	0	—		—		17	0
Karviná	2015–16	CNFL	28	0	1	0	—		—		29	0
Karviná	2016–17	Czech First League	1	0	4	0	—		—		5	0
Karviná	Total		73	0	7	0	—		—		80	0
Notts County	2017–18	EFL League Two	1	0	0	0	0	0	3 (Note: Appearances in EFL Trophy)	0	4	0
Notts County	2018–19	EFL League Two	0	0	0	0	0	0	1	0	1	0
Notts County	Total		1	0	0	0	0	0	4	0	5	0
Nitra	2018–19	Slovak Super Liga	10	0	1	0	—		—		11	0
ViOn Zlaté Moravce	2019–20	Slovak Super Liga	25	0	2	0	—		—		27	0
Raków Częstochowa	2020–21	Ekstraklasa	2	0	1	0	—		—		3	0
Resovia	2021–22	I liga	31	0	0	0	—		—		31	0
Resovia	2022–23	I liga	28	0	0	0	—		—		28	0
Resovia	2023–24	I liga	18	0	1	0	—		—		19	0
Resovia	Total		77	0	1	0	—		—		78	0
Górnik Łęczna	2024–25	I liga	26	0	1	0	—		—		27	0
Górnik Łęczna	2025–26	I liga	18	0	0	0	—		—		18	0
Górnik Łęczna	Total		44	0	1	0	—		—		45	0
Career total			241	0	13	0	0	0	4	0	258	0

== Honours ==
Raków Częstochowa

- Polish Cup: 2020–21

Raków Częstochowa II

- IV liga Silesia I: 2020–21
