= Aleksander Kwiek =

Polish footballer

Personal information
- Full name: Aleksander Kwiek
- Date of birth: 13 January 1983 (age 43)
- Place of birth: Wodzisław Śląski, Poland
- Height: 1.76 m (5 ft 9 in)
- Position: Midfielder

Team information
- Current team: Rymer Rybnik
- Number: 6

Senior career*
Years	Team	Apps	(Gls)
1999–2000	Rymer Niedobczyce		
2001–2004	Odra Wodzisław Śląski	35	(2)
2004–2005	Wisła Kraków	13	(0)
2005–2008	Korona Kielce	20	(0)
2007	→ Górnik Łęczna (loan)	12	(0)
2007–2008	→ Jagiellonia Białystok (loan)	25	(2)
2008–2010	Odra Wodzisław Śląski	34	(3)
2010–2013	Górnik Zabrze	73	(9)
2013–2015	Zagłębie Lubin	61	(12)
2015–2017	Górnik Zabrze	28	(3)
2017–2018	Widzew Łódź	17	(3)
2018–2020	Rymer Rybnik	32	(20)
2021–2022	Silesia Lubomia	17	(5)
2024–	Rymer Rybnik	0	(0)

International career
	Poland U21	4	(1)
- * Club domestic league appearances and goals as of 6 January 2025

Aleksander Kwiek (born 13 January 1983) is a Polish footballer who plays as a midfielder for Rymer Rybnik.

== Club career ==
Born in Wodzisław Śląski, Kwiek started his career with Rymer Niedobczyce. In 2000, he moved to Odra Wodzisław Śląski where he was a key player. In 2004, he joined Wisła Kraków with whom he won the league title, but never established himself as a key player, and left Wisła in mid-2005 to join Korona Kielce, where he stayed for two seasons. In 2006, he signed for Górnik Łęczna. Upon the expiry of his contract, he joined Jagiellonia Białystok. In 2008, he re-signed with Korona Kielce.

== Honours ==
Wisła Kraków

- Ekstraklasa: 2004–05

Zagłębie Lubin

- I liga: 2014–15

Widzew Łódź

- III liga, group I: 2017–18
