= Krzysztof Koton =

Polish footballer (born 2003

Personal information
- Date of birth: 17 May 2003 (age 23)
- Place of birth: Warsaw, Poland
- Height: 1.72 m (5 ft 8 in)
- Position: Midfielder

Team information
- Current team: Dender
- Number: 15

Youth career
- –2021: Polonia Warsaw

Senior career*
Years	Team	Apps	(Gls)
2021–2025	Polonia Warsaw	126	(10)
2025–	Dender	13	(0)

International career^{‡}
2023–2024	Poland U20	3	(0)
- * Club domestic league appearances and goals as of 11 May 2026 ‡ National team caps and goals as of 26 March 2024

Krzysztof Koton (born 17 May 2003) is a Polish professional footballer who plays as a midfielder for Challenger Pro League club Dender.

== Early life ==
Koton was born on 17 May 2003 in Warsaw, Poland and is a native of the city. Growing up, he was a supporter of Polish side Polonia Warsaw.

== Club career ==
As a youth player, Koton joined the youth academy of Polish side Polonia Warsaw and was promoted to the club's senior team ahead of the 2021–22 season, where he made 126 league appearances and scored ten goals and helped them achieve two consecutive promotions from the fourth tier to the second tier. Polish news website wrote in 2025 that he "became a key player for the Warsaw team" while playing for them. Following his stint there, he signed for Belgian side Dender in 2025.

== International career ==
Koton is a Poland youth international. During October and November 2023 and March 2024, he played for the Poland under-20s in the 2023–24 Under 20 Elite League.

== Honours ==
Polonia Warsaw

- II liga: 2022–23
- III liga, group I: 2021–22
