= Lee Jin-hyun =

South Korean footballer (born 1997)

Lee Jin-hyun 이진현
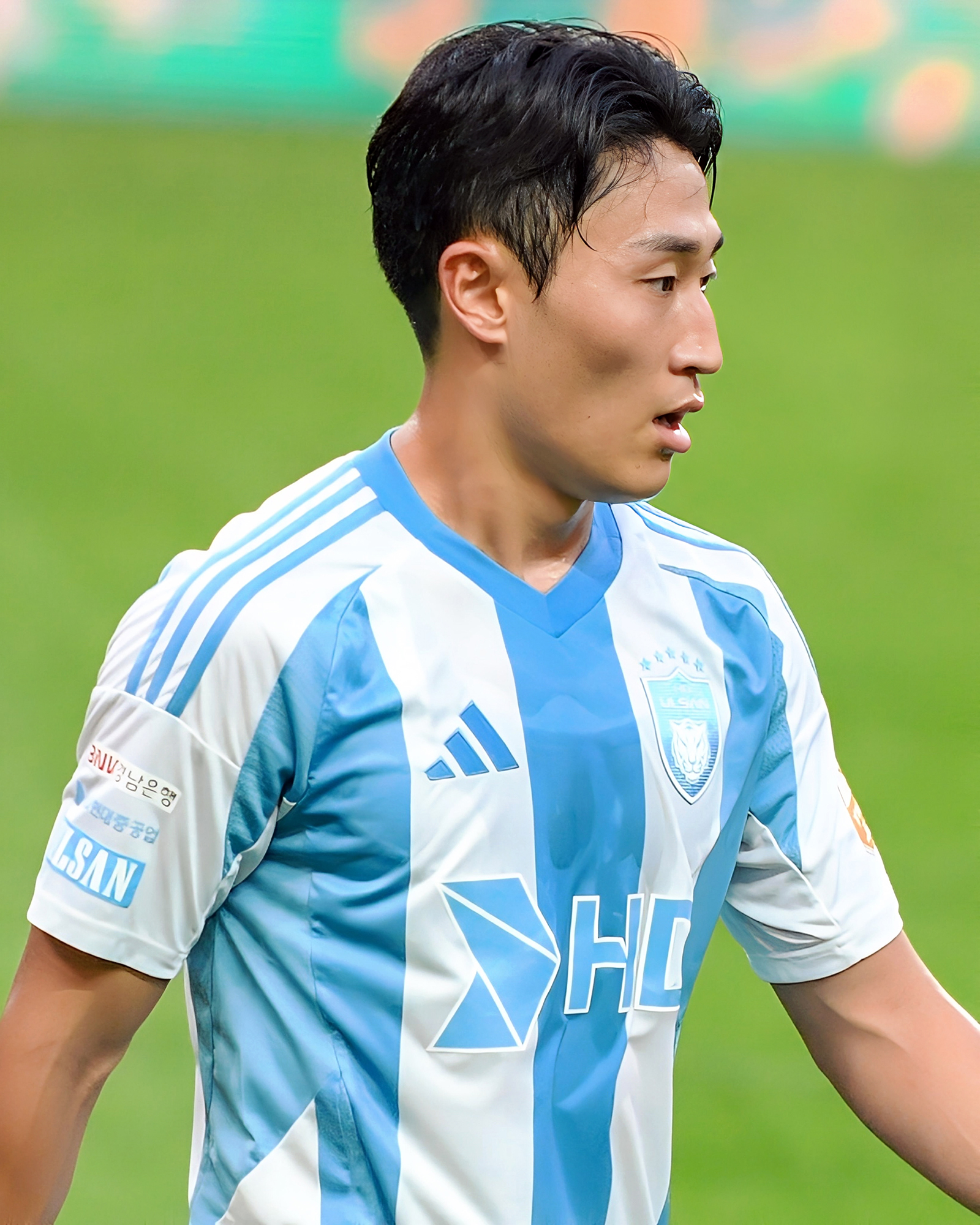
- Lee in 2025

Personal information
- Full name: Lee Jin-hyun
- Date of birth: 26 August 1997 (age 29)
- Place of birth: Pohang, Gyeongbuk, South Korea
- Height: 1.73 m (5 ft 8 in)
- Position: Central midfielder

Team information
- Current team: Ulsan HD
- Number: 14

Youth career
- Pohang Pocheol High School
- 2016–2017: Sungkyunkwan University

Senior career*
Years	Team	Apps	(Gls)
2017–2019	Pohang Steelers	37	(6)
2017–2018	→ Austria Wien (loan)	13	(1)
2020	Daegu FC	21	(1)
2021–2023	Daejeon Hana Citizen	78	(8)
2024–2025	Puszcza Niepołomice	31	(0)
2025–	Ulsan HD	43	(1)

International career
2015–2017	South Korea U20	14	(0)
2017–2018	South Korea U23	8	(0)
2018–2021	South Korea	4	(0)
Medal record
Representing South Korea
Men's football
Asian Games
Gold medal – first place	2018 Jakarta-Palembang	Team
- * Club domestic league appearances and goals as of 3 August 2026

- Lee Jin-hyun
- Hangul: 이진현
- RR: I Jinhyeon
- MR: I Chinhyŏn

Lee Jin-hyun (Korean: 이진현; born 26 August 1997) is a South Korean professional footballer who plays as a midfielder for K League 1 club Ulsan HD.

== Club career ==
He graduated from Pohang Iron & Steel Elementary School, Pohang Steel Middle School, and Pohang Steel High School, which are affiliated with the Pohang Steelers, and entered Sungkyunkwan University after being selected by the Pohang Steelers in 2016.

=== Austria Wien ===
On 11 August 2017, he moved to Austrian Bundesliga side Austria Wien on a one-year loan with an additional purchase option for another three years.

On 27 August 2017, Lee made his debut appearance against Admira Wacker and he also scored his debut goal at the 76th minute.

== International career ==
Lee made his debut for the South Korea U-20 national team on 4 January 2015 in a draw against Finland in the 2015 Granatkin Memorial.

He won the gold medal with the South Korea U-23 national team at the 2018 Asian Games.

== Career statistics ==
=== Club ===
As of match played on 8 December 2024.

Appearances and goals by club, season and competition
Club	Season	League			National cup (Note: includes Austrian Cup, Korean FA Cup, Polish Cup)		Continental		Other		Total	
Club	Season	Division	Apps	Goals	Apps	Goals	Apps	Goals	Apps	Goals	Apps	Goals
Austria Wien (loan)	2017–18	Austrian Bundesliga	13	1	2	0	3 (Note: Appearances in UEFA Europa League)	0	—		18	1
Pohang Steelers	2018	K League 1	17	5	1	0	—		—		18	5
Pohang Steelers	2019	K League 1	20	1	0	0	—		—		20	1
Pohang Steelers	Total		37	6	1	0	—		—		38	6
Daegu FC	2020	K League 1	21	1	2	0	—		—		23	1
Daejeon Hana Citizen	2021	K League 2	22	1	0	0	—		—		22	1
Daejeon Hana Citizen	2022	K League 2	27	4	1	0	—		2 (Note: Appearances in K League promotion-relegation playoffs)	2	30	6
Daejeon Hana Citizen	2023	K League 1	29	3	0	0	—		—		29	3
Daejeon Hana Citizen	Total		78	8	1	0	—		2	2	81	10
Puszcza Niepołomice	2023–24	Ekstraklasa	13	0	—		—		—		13	0
Puszcza Niepołomice	2024–25	Ekstraklasa	18	0	3	0	—		—		21	0
Puszcza Niepołomice	Total		31	0	3	0	—		—		34	0
Career totals			180	16	9	0	3	0	2	2	194	18

=== International ===
Appearances and goals by national team and year
National team	Year	Apps	Goals
South Korea
South Korea	2018	2	0
South Korea	2019	1	0
South Korea	2021	1	0
Total		4	0

== Honours ==
South Korea U23

- Asian Games gold medal: 2018
