= Dawid Abramowicz =

Polish footballer

Personal information
- Full name: Dawid Abramowicz
- Date of birth: 16 May 1991 (age 35)
- Place of birth: Brzeg Dolny, Poland
- Height: 1.86 m (6 ft 1 in)
- Position: Left-back

Team information
- Current team: Olimpia Grudziądz
- Number: 33

Youth career
- –2008: KP Brzeg Dolny

Senior career*
Years	Team	Apps	(Gls)
2008–2009	KP Brzeg Dolny		
2009–2010	Śląsk Wrocław II		
2010–2013	Śląsk Wrocław	0	(0)
2012	→ Olimpia Grudziądz (loan)	14	(0)
2013	→ Chojniczanka Chojnice (loan)	14	(1)
2013–2014	Wisła Płock	2	(0)
2014	Skra Częstochowa	20	(0)
2015	Odra Opole	15	(2)
2015	Bruk-Bet Termalica Nieciecza	0	(0)
2015–2016	Puszcza Niepołomice	23	(1)
2016–2017	GKS Katowice	31	(3)
2017–2019	GKS Tychy	59	(5)
2019–2020	Radomiak Radom	33	(3)
2020–2021	Wisła Kraków	12	(0)
2021–2024	Radomiak Radom	116	(11)
2024–2025	Puszcza Niepołomice	28	(1)
2025–2026	Arka Gdynia	14	(1)
2026–	Olimpia Grudziądz	0	(0)
- * Club domestic league appearances and goals as of 17:40, 25 May 2026 (UTC)

Dawid Abramowicz (born 16 May 1991) is a Polish professional footballer who plays as a left-back for II liga club Olimpia Grudziądz.

== Club career ==
On 14 August 2020, Abramowicz signed a two-year contract with Wisła Kraków.

== Personal life ==
He has a brother, Mateusz, who is also a footballer, currently playing for Świt Szczecin.

== Honours ==
Odra Opole

- Polish Cup (Opole regionals): 2014–15

Radomiak Radom

- I liga: 2020–21
