= Łukasz Grzeszczyk =

Polish footballer

Personal information
- Full name: Łukasz Grzeszczyk
- Date of birth: 29 July 1987 (age 39)
- Place of birth: Ostrołęka, Poland
- Height: 1.83 m (6 ft 0 in)
- Position: Attacking midfielder

Team information
- Current team: Podlesianka Katowice
- Number: 8

Senior career*
Years	Team	Apps	(Gls)
2004–2006	Narew Ostrołęka		
2006–2009	Wisła Płock	17	(1)
2006	→ Mazowsze Płock (loan)		
2007–2008	→ Znicz Pruszków (loan)		
2009–2011	Widzew Łódź	33	(2)
2012	Warta Poznań	26	(5)
2013	GKS Bełchatów	4	(0)
2013–2014	Sandecja Nowy Sącz	51	(8)
2015–2022	GKS Tychy	222	(60)
2022–2023	Górnik Łęczna	22	(2)
2023–	Podlesianka Katowice	63	(11)
- * Club domestic league appearances and goals as of 21:42, 18 June 2025 (UTC)

Łukasz Grzeszczyk (born 29 July 1987) is a Polish professional footballer who plays as an attacking midfielder for IV liga Silesia club Podlesianka Katowice.

== Honours ==
Widzew Łódź

- I liga: 2008–09, 2009–10

Podlesianka Katowice

- IV liga Silesia I: 2023–24

Individual

- II liga top scorer: 2015–16
