= Maciej Bębenek =

Polish footballer

Personal information
- Full name: Maciej Bębenek
- Date of birth: 22 September 1984 (age 42)
- Place of birth: Kraków, Poland
- Height: 1.73 m (5 ft 8 in)
- Position: Midfielder

Team information
- Current team: Wieczysta Kraków (team manager)

Youth career
- Wieczysta Kraków

Senior career*
Years	Team	Apps	(Gls)
2002	Olimpic Kraków		
2003–2006	Kmita Zabierzów		
2006	Widzew Łódź	2	(0)
2007–2008	Kmita Zabierzów	72	(4)
2009	Polonia Bytom	2	(0)
2009–2010	Sandecja Nowy Sącz	31	(7)
2010–2013	Górnik Zabrze	9	(0)
2013–2015	Sandecja Nowy Sącz	75	(7)
2015–2017	GKS Katowice	27	(1)
2017–2019	Wiślanie Jaśkowice	44	(5)
2019	Wieczysta Kraków	24	(16)
- * Club domestic league appearances and goals

Maciej Bębenek (born 22 September 1984) is a Polish former professional footballer who played as a midfielder. He is currently the team manager of Ekstraklasa club Wieczysta Kraków.

== Career ==
In September 2017, Bębenek joined Wiślanie Jaśkowice. He played for the club until January 2019, when he re-joined his childhood club Wieczysta Kraków.
