= Damian Warchoł =

Polish footballer

Personal information
- Full name: Damian Warchoł
- Date of birth: 19 July 1995 (age 31)
- Place of birth: Łódź, Poland
- Height: 1.83 m (6 ft 0 in)
- Position: Attacking midfielder

Team information
- Current team: Śląsk Wrocław

Youth career
- –2011: Widok Skierniewice
- 2011–2013: GKS Bełchatów
- 2013–2015: Widzew Łódź

Senior career*
Years	Team	Apps	(Gls)
2013–2014	Widzew Łódź II	25	(9)
2014–2015	Widzew Łódź	10	(2)
2015–2018	Raków Częstochowa	28	(13)
2016–2017	→ Olimpia Grudziądz (loan)	10	(1)
2017	→ MKS Kluczbork (loan)	13	(2)
2018	KKS Kalisz	4	(0)
2018–2019	Unia Skierniewice	25	(13)
2019	Pelikan Łowicz	16	(17)
2020–2021	Legia Warsaw II	25	(19)
2020	Legia Warsaw	1	(1)
2021–2023	Wisła Płock	38	(9)
2024–2025	Górnik Łęczna	44	(17)
2025–	Śląsk Wrocław	19	(5)
- * Club domestic league appearances and goals as of 12:52, 26 May 2026 (UTC)

Damian Warchoł (born 19 July 1995) is a Polish professional footballer who plays as a midfielder for Ekstraklasa club Śląsk Wrocław.

== Career ==
After one season with Unia Skierniewice, Warchoł joined Pelikan Łowicz on 23 July 2019. In 2020, he was signed as the Legia Warsaw II player. On 14 July 2020 Damian Warchoł was reported to the games as a player of its PKO Ekstraklasa first team. He made his debut on 19 July 2020 in the match against Pogoń Szczecin, as he scored to 1–2.

On 14 July 2021, Warchoł joined Wisła Płock on a deal until June 2022 with an option for one further year.

Warchoł left Wisła after it was relegated to I liga at the end of the 2022–23 season and remained a free agent until 30 January 2024, when he signed an eighteen-month contract with Górnik Łęczna.

On 23 June 2025, Warchoł moved to fellow second division club Śląsk Wrocław on a two-year deal, with an option for a further year.

== Honours ==
Unia Skierniewice

- Polish Cup (Łódź regionals): 2018–19

Legia Warsaw

- Ekstraklasa: 2019–20

Individual

- III liga, group I top scorer: 2019–20
