= Father Władysław Augustynek Stadium =

Football stadium in Nowy Sącz, Poland

Stadion im. Ojca Władysława Augustynka
- Interactive map of Stadion im. Ojca Władysława Augustynka
- Former names: Stadion XXV-lecia PRL (PRL 25th Anniversary Stadium)
- Location: ul. Jana Kilińskiego 47, Nowy Sącz
- Coordinates: 49°37′12.36″N 20°42′16.92″E
- Owner: Sandecja Nowy Sącz
- Capacity: 2,500
- Surface: Grass
- Field size: 110 m × 70 m (360 ft × 230 ft)

Construction
- Built: 1968–1970
- Opened: 2 May 1970
- Closed: 2021
- Demolished: 2022

Tenants
- Sandecja Nowy Sącz

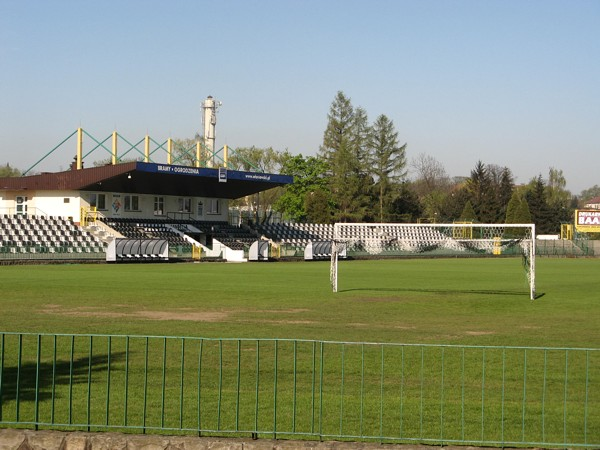

Stadion im. Ojca Władysława Augustynka (Father Władysław Augustynek Stadium) was a football stadium in Nowy Sącz, Poland. Home to Sandecja Nowy Sącz, it was closed in 2021 and demolished the following year, with Sandecja Stadium being built as its replacement in the same location.

== History ==
Władysław Augustynek Stadium was opened on 2 May 1970, hosting a football match between the youth national teams of Poland and Hungary, with the latter winning 3–2.

The stadium was originally named Stadion XXV-lecia PRL (PRL 25th Anniversary Stadium), at the initiative of the then Communist leaders of the city, to celebrate 25 years of existence of the PRL. In 1998, nive years after the fall of communism in Poland, the stadium was renamed in the honour of Father Władysław Augustynek, a popular local Catholic priest, who was a passionate fan of the club.

In 2017, following Sandecja's promotion to the Ekstraklasa, the club was forced to play at the Bruk-Bet Stadium throughout the 2017–18 Ekstraklasa season, since the stadium did not meet PZPN and league regulations.

In 2018, Sandecja returned to Władysław Augustynek Stadium following their relegation from Ekstraklasa. The club was forced to spend 720,000 zł (approx. £150,000) to refurbish the stadium to comply with I liga regulations, which included installing new seats.

== Failed expansion plans, closure ==
In 2017, the club announced that the stadium would be fully renovated in order to comply with Ekstraklasa regulations. The stadium would include four brand new stands, each with a roof, and the stadium's capacity would increase to 8,000. However, these plans were never realised, and throughout the 2017–18 Ekstraklasa season, while Sandecja was playing in Nieciecza, no works have been done at the stadium. The club's hierarchy has been met with heavy criticism from Sandecja fans and from Polish former footballer and then PZPN chairman Zbigniew Boniek for their failure to renovate the stadium.

In 2018, the Mayor of Nowy Sącz Ryszard Nowak, presented the design of the new venue, which has been approved by PZPN. The new stadium is expected to hold 8,111 people and meet UEFA category III regulations. The stadium will cost 85 million PLN (approx. £20 million), and is set to be officially opened in 2025.

In 2021, deconstruction work began and was completed the following year.
