= Wigry Suwałki =

Polish football club

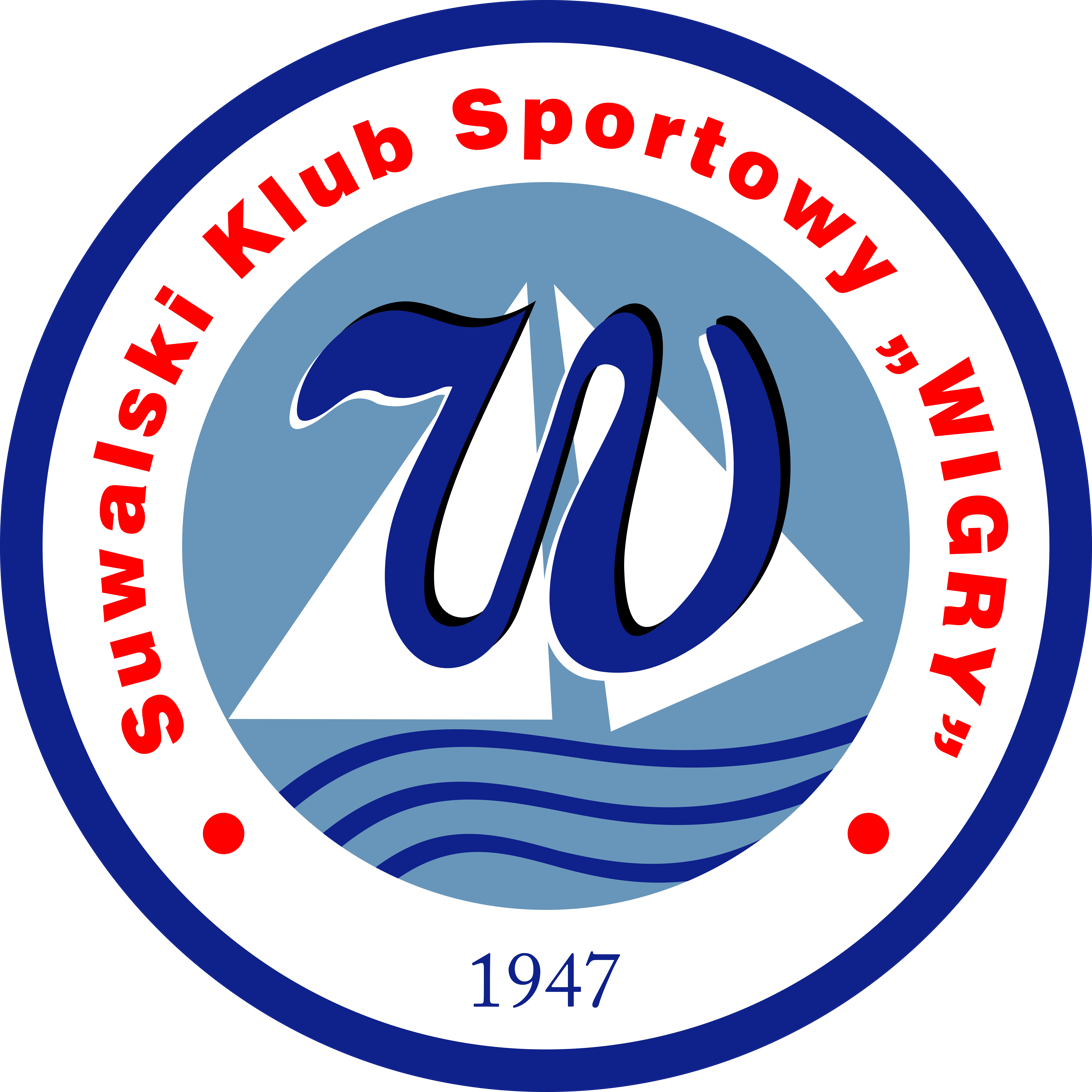
- Full name: Suwalski Klub Sportowy; Wigry Suwałki
- Founded: 1947; 79 years ago (as WKS Suwałki)
- Ground: Municipal Stadium in Suwałki
- Capacity: 2,910
- Chairman: Dariusz Mazur (acting)
- Manager: Arkadiusz Szczerbowski
- League: III liga, group I
- 2025–26: III liga, group I, 4th of 18
- Website: wigrysuwalki.eu/strona-glowna/
Home colours	Away colours

Wigry Suwałki is a Polish football club based in Suwałki, Podlaskie Voivodeship. In the 2026–27 season, they compete in group I of the III liga. They play their home games at the Municipal Stadium in Suwałki.

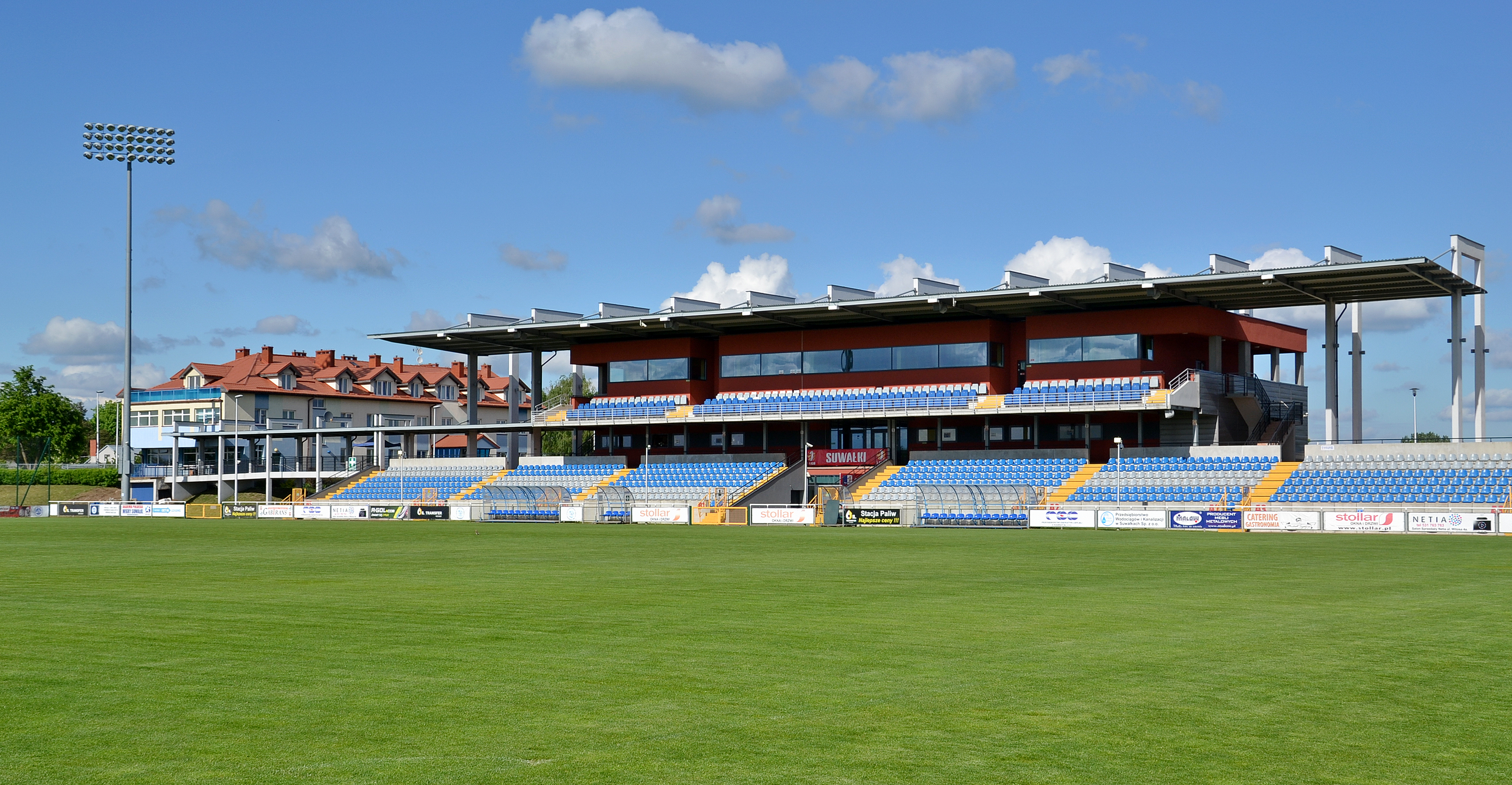
Municipal Stadium in Suwałki

== Players ==
=== Current squad ===
As of 1 March 2025

Note: Flags indicate national team as defined under FIFA eligibility rules; some limited exceptions apply. Players may hold more than one non-FIFA nationality.

No.	Pos.	Nation	Player
3	MF	POL	Kacper Babkowski
4	MF	POL	Przemysław Modzelewski
5	MF	POL	Michał Ozga
6	DF	POL	Nataniel Wybraniec
8	MF	POL	Oskar Osipiuk
10	MF	POL	Maciej Makuszewski
11	MF	POL	Kacper Głowicki
14	MF	POL	Michał Mościcki
16	FW	POL	Patryk Bednarczyk
27	DF	POL	Eryk Matus
30	GK	POL	Michał Dębski
34	DF	UKR	Pavlo Berezyanskyi

No.	Pos.	Nation	Player
43	GK	POL	Mateusz Taudul (captain)
89	MF	POL	Bartosz Gużewski
94	DF	POL	Jakub Paszkowski
—	MF	POL	Igor Bartoszuk
—	MF	POL	Jakub Guzewicz
—	GK	POL	Jakub Kanclerz
—	FW	POL	Jakub Lutostański (on loan from Pogoń Siedlce)
—	MF	POL	Mateusz Malec
—	DF	POL	Konrad Magnuszewski
—	MF	POL	Kacper Rejterada
—	DF	POL	Bruno Sowulewski
—	MF	POL	Konrad Zaklika

=== Out on loan ===
Note: Flags indicate national team as defined under FIFA eligibility rules; some limited exceptions apply. Players may hold more than one non-FIFA nationality.

No.	Pos.	Nation	Player
99	MF	POL	Łukasz Trąbka (at Olimpia Zambrów until 30 June 2025)

=== Retired numbers ===
Note: Flags indicate national team as defined under FIFA eligibility rules; some limited exceptions apply. Players may hold more than one non-FIFA nationality.

No.	Pos.	Nation	Player
7	MF	POL	Rafał Trocki (2000–08 – posthumous honour)

=== Notable players ===
Notable Polish players

- (Poland) Rafał Augustyniak
- (Poland) Jacek Bayer
- (Poland) Jarosław Gierejkiewicz
- (Poland) Zbigniew Kaczmarek
- (Poland) Damian Kądzior
- (Poland) Wojciech Kowalewski
- (Poland) Zbigniew Kwaśniewski
- (Poland) Maciej Makuszewski
- (Poland) Patryk Małecki

Notable foreign players

- (Latvia) Maksims Rafaļskis
- (Lithuania) Paulius Grybauskas
- (Lithuania) Povilas Lukšys
- (Lithuania) Gražvydas Mikulėnas
- (Lithuania) Darvydas Šernas
- (Lithuania) Vaidas Žutautas
- (Nigeria) Michael Sanni
- (Slovakia) Martin Dobrotka
