= Puszcza Niepołomice =

Polish football club located in Niepołomice, Poland

- Full name: Miejski Klub Sportowy; Puszcza Niepołomice
- Nickname: Żubry (the Wisents)
- Founded: 1923; 103 years ago
- Ground: Niepołomice Stadium
- Capacity: 2,000
- Chairman: Jarosław Pieprzyca
- Manager: Tomasz Tułacz
- League: I liga
- 2025–26: I liga, 9th of 18
- Website: www.puszcza-niepolomice.pl
Home colours	Away colours

MKS Puszcza Niepołomice (Polish pronunciation: [ˈpuʂt͡ʂa ɲɛpɔwɔˈmit͡sɛ]) is a professional football club located in Niepołomice, Poland. The team competes in the I liga, the second level of the Polish football league system. The team's colors are yellow, white and green.

In 2023, the club secured promotion to the Ekstraklasa for the first time in its history, remaining in the top flight until 2025.

== History ==
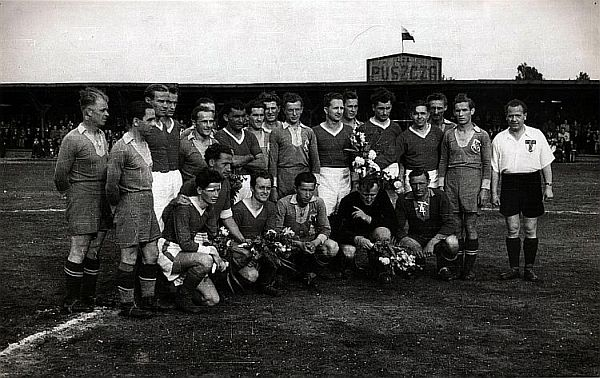
Puszcza Niepołomice team in the interwar period

Puszcza Niepołomice was originally called Sports Club Niepołomianka. The team was established on the initiative of mayor Andrzej Wimer and Stanisław Ziemba, Władysław Iwański, Stanisław Brudnik and Adolf Engel in 1923.

The first president of KS Niepołomianka was Władysław Iwański. The then board also included the treasurer Stanisław Brudnik and the manager of the team - Stanisław Ziemba.

On 11 June 2023, a year in which Puszcza celebrated their 100th anniversary, they won the 2022–23 I liga play-off final and achieved promotion to Ekstraklasa for the first time in the club's history.

In their first-ever top-flight season, Puszcza recorded upset wins and draws against title contenders, and were praised for their effective use of set-pieces to score the majority of their goals, as they finished the 2023–24 campaign in 12th. For their efforts, Tomasz Tułacz and Oliwier Zych were nominated for Coach of the Season and Goalkeeper of the Season awards, respectively.

In the 2024–25 season, after finishing in last place, the club was relegated from the Ekstraklasa. Apart from the relegation, the season also went down in history as the club's greatest success in the Polish Cup as the team from Niepołomice reached the semi-finals, coming within touching distance of the National Stadium where the finals are held.

== Honours ==
- I liga
  - Promotion play-off winner: 2022–23
- Polish Cup
  - Semi-finalists: 2024–25

== Stadium ==
After earning promotion to Ekstraklasa in 2023, Puszcza Niepołomice played their home games at the Józef Piłsudski Cracovia Stadium in Kraków, due to their ground in Niepołomice not meeting the requirements to host top-flight matches. They returned to their home stadium on 2 March 2025, playing against Motor Lublin.

== Players ==
=== Current squad ===
As of 15 September 2026

Note: Flags indicate national team as defined under FIFA eligibility rules; some limited exceptions apply. Players may hold more than one non-FIFA nationality.

No.	Pos.	Nation	Player
1	GK	POL	Filip Andrzejczak
2	DF	POL	Konrad Kasolik
5	DF	POL	Konrad Stępień (captain)
6	MF	SVN	Omar Kočar
8	MF	POR	Filipe Nascimento
9	FW	ALB	Amarildo Gjoni
10	MF	POL	Mateusz Cholewiak
11	MF	POL	Olaf Korczakowski
13	MF	POL	Filip Jaworski
14	DF	POL	Filip Szabaciuk
17	FW	JPN	Kōsei Iwao
21	FW	POL	Oskar Gerstenstein
23	DF	POL	Kacper Przybyłko
28	MF	POL	Igor Pieprzyca

No.	Pos.	Nation	Player
33	DF	SVN	Mark Strajnar
34	DF	POL	Adrian Piekarski
41	GK	POL	Kacper Smok
53	FW	POL	Andrzej Trubeha
64	DF	POL	Kacper Wołowiec
77	FW	POL	Wiktor Kamiński
80	MF	POL	Szymon Mendalski
88	MF	POL	Szymon Fielek
91	GK	POL	Jakub Grębla
97	GK	POL	Wiktor Kowal
99	FW	POL	Bartosz Kurzeja
—	MF	POL	Filip Cisak
—	MF	POL	Szymon Mendalski

=== Out on loan ===
Note: Flags indicate national team as defined under FIFA eligibility rules; some limited exceptions apply. Players may hold more than one non-FIFA nationality.

No.	Pos.	Nation	Player
4	MF	POL	Adam Gałązka (at Wieczysta Kraków II until 30 June 2027)
25	MF	POL	Przemysław Sajdak (at Hutnik Kraków until 30 June 2027)

No.	Pos.	Nation	Player
47	MF	POL	Adam Sendor (at Olimpia Zambrów until 30 June 2027)

=== Notable players ===
The players below played for their respective countries at any point during their career.

Notable Polish players

- (Poland) Rafał Boguski
- (Poland) Piotr Madejski
- (Poland) Tomasz Moskała

Notable foreign players

- (Belarus) Herman Barkouski
- (Guinea-Bissau) José Embaló
- (Kazakhstan) Georgy Zhukov
- (South Korea) Lee Jin-hyun
- (Moldova) Artur Crăciun
- (Moldova) Ioan-Călin Revenco
- (North Macedonia) Jani Atanasov
- (Philippines) Diego Bardanca
- (Slovakia) Erik Čikoš
