= 2023–24 Legia Warsaw season =

Legia Warsaw
2023–24 season
- Chairman: Dariusz Mioduski
- Manager: Kosta Runjaić (until 9 April 2024); Gonçalo Feio (from 10 April 2024)
- Stadium: Stadion Wojska Polskiego
- Ekstraklasa: 3rd
- Polish Cup: Round of 16
- Polish Super Cup: Winners
- UEFA Europa Conference League: Knockout round play-offs
- Top goalscorer: League: Tomáš Pekhart (8); All: Tomáš Pekhart (13)
- Highest home attendance: 29,028 v Lech Poznań (12 November 2023, Ekstraklasa)
- Lowest home attendance: 20,116 v MKS Cracovia (17 December 2023, Ekstraklasa)
- Average home league attendance: 24,689
- Biggest win: 3-0 v ŁKS Łódź (21 July 2023); 3-0 v Ruch Chorzów (6 August 2023); 0-3 v Zagłębie Lubin (3 December 2023)
- Biggest defeat: 4-0 v Śląsk Wrocław (21 October 2023)
Home colours	Away colours

The 2023–24 season was Legia Warsaw's 107th season in existence and the club's 76th consecutive season in the top flight of Polish football. In addition to the domestic league, they also participated in this season's editions of the Polish Super Cup, Polish Cup, Polish, and UEFA Europa Conference League, returning to the European football after a year-long absence. The season covered the period from 1 July 2023 to 25 May 2024.

== Management team ==
Position	Name
Head coach	(Germany) Kosta Runjaić
Assistant coaches	(Poland) Przemysław Małecki, (Spain) Inaki Astiz
Fitness coaches	(Poland) Bartosz Bibrowicz, (Greece) Stergios Fotopoulos, (Poland) Dawid Goliński
Goalkeeping coaches	(Poland) Arkadiusz Malarz, (Poland) Krzysztof Dowhań
Analysts	(Poland) Piotr Parchan, (Poland) Przemysław Małecki

- Last updated: June 2023

== Players ==
=== First-team squad ===
As of 22 August 2022

Note: Flags indicate national team as defined under FIFA eligibility rules; some limited exceptions apply. Players may hold more than one non-FIFA nationality.

No.	Pos.	Nation	Player
1	GK	POL	Kacper Tobiasz
3	DF	FRA	Steve Kapuadi
4	DF	SUI	Marco Burch
5	DF	POR	Yuri Ribeiro
6	MW	RUS	Ramil Mustafajew
7	FW	CZE	Tomáš Pekhart
8	MF	POL	Rafał Augustyniak
9	FW	SLO	Blaž Kramer
11	MF	SVK	Róbert Pich
12	DF	SRB	Radovan Pankov
13	MF	POL	Paweł Wszołek
14	MF	UKR	Ihor Kharatin
17	MF	POR	Gil Dias
18	MF	POL	Patryk Sokołowski
20	FW	ALB	Ernest Muçi
21	MF	ALB	Jurgen Çelhaka
22	MF	COL	Juergen Elitim

No.	Pos.	Nation	Player
24	DF	POL	Jan Ziółkowski
26	MF	POL	Filip Rejczyk
27	MF	POR	Josué (captain)
28	FW	ESP	Marc Gual
29	DF	MRI	Lindsay Rose
30	GK	POL	Dominik Hładun
31	GK	POL	Cezary Miszta
32	MF	GER	Makana Baku
33	MF	POL	Patryk Kun
39	FW	POL	Maciej Rosołek
55	DF	POL	Artur Jędrzejczyk
63	MF	POL	Jakub Kisiel
67	MF	POL	Bartosz Kapustka
77	MF	POL	Jakub Jędrasik
81	GK	POL	Jakub Trojanowski
86	MF	POL	Igor Strzałek
99	MF	POL	Bartosz Slisz

=== Transfers ===
==== In ====
Pos	Player	From	Type	Fee	Date	Source
FW	(Spain) Marc Gual	Jagiellonia Białystok	Transfer	Free	30 June 2023	
MF	(Poland) Patryk Kun	Raków Częstochowa	Transfer	Free	30 June 2023	
DF	(Serbia) Radovan Pankov	Red Star Belgrade	Transfer	Free	30 June 2023	
MF	(Colombia) Juergen Elitim	Watford F.C.	Transfer	Free	30 June 2023	
GK	(Poland) Gabriel Kobylak	Radomiak Radom	End of loan	Free	1 July 2023	
DF	(Poland) Ramil Mustafajew	Stal Rzeszów	End of loan	Free	1 July 2023	
DF	(France) Steve Kapuadi	Wisła Płock	Transfer	?	22 August 2023	
DF	(Switzerland) Marco Burch	FC Luzern	Transfer	?	3 September 2023	
MF	(Portugal) Gil Dias	VfB Stuttgart	Loan	?	4 September 2023	
MF	(Japan) Ryoya Morishita	Nagoya Grampus	Loan	?	9 January 2024	
MF	(Kosovo) Qëndrim Zyba	FC Ballkani	Loan	?	2 February 2024	

==== Out ====
Pos	Player	To	Type	Fee	Date	Source
DF	(Serbia) Filip Mladenović	Panathinaikos F.C.	Transfer	Free	12 June 2023	
DF	(Poland) Kacper Skibicki	GKS Tychy	Transfer	Undisclosed	30 June 2023	
DF	(Israel) Joel Abu Hanna	Maccabi Netanya F.C.	Transfer	Free	27 June 2023	
DF	(Poland) Maik Nawrocki	Celtic F.C.	Transfer	£4,300,000	26 July 2023	
DF	(Poland) Nikodem Niski	Pogoń Grodzisk Mazowiecki	Transfer	?	1 August 2023	
MF	(Poland) Bartosz Slisz	Atlanta United FC	Transfer	$3,500,000	17 January 2024	
MF	(Poland) Jakub Jędrasik	Bruk-Bet Termalica Nieciecza	Transfer	?	24 January 2024	
MF	(Albania) Ernest Muçi	Beşiktaş J.K.	Transfer	€10,000,000	9 February 2024	

===== Out on loan =====
Pos	Player	To	On loan until	Fee	Date	Source
FW	(Poland) Jordan Majchrzak	Puszcza Niepołomice	End of season	?	20 July 2023	
MF	(Poland) Maddox Sobociński	GKS Wikielec	End of season	?	27 July 2023	
MF	(Poland) Bartłomiej Ciepiela	Resovia Rzeszów	End of season	?	11 August 2023	
MF	(Germany) Makana Baku	OFI	End of season	?	15 January 2024	
MF	(Poland) Igor Strzałek	Stal Mielec	End of season	?	15 January 2024	
MF	(Poland) Cezary Miszta	Rio Ave F.C.	End of season	?	30 January 2024	
GK	(Poland) Gabriel Kobylak	Radomiak Radom	End of season	?	29 January 2024	

===== Released =====
Pos	Player	Subsequent club	Type	Date	Source
MF	(Sweden) Mattias Johansson	–	End of contract	30 June 2023	
GK	(Poland) Jakub Trojanowski	GKS Jastrzębie	End of contract	30 June 2023	
FW	(Spain) Carlitos	PAS Lamia 1964	Contract termination	1 August 2023	
DF	(Mauritius) Lindsay Rose	Aris Thessaloniki	Contract termination	29 December 2023	
MF	(Poland) Patryk Sokołowski	Cracovia	End of contract	31 December 2023	
MF	(Poland) Kacper Bogusiewicz	Pogoń Siedlce	End of contract	31 December 2023	
MF	(Slovakia) Róbert Pich	Othellos Athienou FC	Contract termination	4 January 2024	

== Pre-season and friendlies ==
On 26 June, Legia left for a 10-day training camp in Kranzach in the municipality of Kössen, Austria. The footballers stayed at the Hotel Seehof. Missing from the first-team players was Igor Strzałek, who was included in the Under-19 national team playing in the European Championships at the time. Before the trip, the players won a friendly against Lechia Gdańsk at the Legia Training Center. In Austria, Legia played three friendly matches. The first against FC Botoșani was won confidently 5–0, with a hattrick scored by Blaž Kramer. In the next match against Qarabağ FK, Legia were led by assistant coach Przemysław Małecki as Kosta Runjaić left the training camp for private reasons. Legia won 2–0, with newly acquired Juergen Elitim scoring his first goal for the team. The last and most difficult opponent during the training camp was the Austrian champion FC Red Bull Salzburg, against whom Legia, however, won 2:0 after a good game.

During the training camp in Austria, Israeli Ilay Elmkies was tested and played in a game against FC Botoșani, but the club decided not to sign him and the player left the training camp on 1 July.

Win Draw Loss Fixtures

24 June 2023 Friendly	Legia Warsaw	3–1	Lechia Gdańsk	Książenice, Poland
13:00 CEST	Carlitos 22'; Josué 28'; Mustafajew 68'	Report	Sezonienko 85'	Stadium: Legia Training Center

28 June 2023 Friendly	Legia Warsaw	5–0	FC Botoșani	Schwaz, Austria
18:00 CEST	Kramer 10'; Gual 11'; Kramer 38'; Kramer 39'; Gual 42'	Report		Stadium: Silberstadt-Arena

1 July 2023 Friendly	Legia Warsaw	2–0	Qarabağ FK	Kössen, Austria
18:00 CEST	Rosołek 74'; Elitim 80'	Report		Stadium: Kaiserwinkl Arena

4 July 2023 Friendly	Legia Warsaw	2–0	FC Red Bull Salzburg	Saalfelden, Austria
18:00 CEST	Augustyniak 66'; Nawrocki 72'	Report		Stadium: Saalfelden Arena

14 January 2024 Friendly	Legia Warsaw	6–0	Olimpia Elbląg	Książenice, Poland
14:00 CEST	Witan 18' (o.g.); Rosołek 25'; Gual 34'; Gual 36'; Rosołek 44'; Urbański 83'			Stadium: Legia Training Center

20 January 2024 Friendly	Legia Warsaw	1–0	FC Ordabasy	Belek, Turkey
15:00 CEST	Elitim 77'	Report

25 January 2024 Friendly	Legia Warsaw	1–1	Rapid Wien	Belek, Turkey
15:00 CEST	Josué 77'	Report	Burgstaller 62'

29 January 2024 Friendly	Legia Warsaw	3–1	Dinamo Kyiv	Belek, Turkey
15:00 CEST	Muçi 31'; Augustyniak 45'; Kramer 55'	Report	Benito 34'	Referee: Damian Sylwestrzak

2 February 2024 Friendly	Legia Warsaw	3–1	Stal Rzeszów	Książenice, Poland
14:00 CEST	Muçi 38'; Pekhart 49'; Ribeiro 59'	Report	Bukowski 7'	Stadium: Legia Training Center; Referee: Damian Sylwestrzak

== Competitions ==
=== Overview ===
Competition	First match	Last match	Starting round	Final position	Record							
Competition	First match	Last match	Starting round	Final position	Pld	W	D	L	GF	GA	GD	Win %
Ekstraklasa	21 July 2023	27 May 2024	Matchday 1	Matchday 34	19	9	5	5	29	23	+6	47.37
Polish Cup	2 November 2023	6 December 2023	Round of 32	Round of 16	2	1		1	3	3	+0	50.00
Polish Super Cup	15 July 2023		Final	Winner	1	1			0	0	+0	100.00
UEFA Europa Conference League	27 July 2023		First qualifying round		12	7	2	3	25	19	+6	58.33
Total					34	18	7	9	57	45	+12	52.94

Last updated: 26 September 2023
Source: Competitions

=== Ekstraklasa ===
==== League table ====
Pos	Team	Pld	W	D	L	GF	GA	GD	Pts	Qualification or relegation
1	Jagiellonia Białystok	34	18	9	7	77	45	+32	63 (Note: Jagiellonia Białystok finished ahead of Śląsk Wrocław on head-to-head goal difference: Śląsk Wrocław 2–1 Jagiellonia Białystok, Jagiellonia Białystok 3–1 Śląsk Wrocław)	Qualification for the Champions League second qualifying round
2	Śląsk Wrocław	34	18	9	7	50	31	+19	63	Qualification for the Conference League second qualifying round
3	Legia Warsaw	34	16	11	7	51	39	+12	59	Qualification for the Conference League second qualifying round
4	Pogoń Szczecin	34	16	7	11	59	38	+21	55	
5	Lech Poznań	34	14	11	9	47	41	+6	53	

Source: ekstraklasa.org 90minut.pl
Rules for classification: 1) Points; 2) Head-to-head points; 3) Head-to-head goal difference; 4) Goal difference; 5) Goals scored; 6) Number of wins; 7) Number of away wins; 8) Lower number of points based on yellow and red cards (red card = 3 points, yellow card = 1 point, sending-off = 3 points - including 1 point for first yellow card); 9) Fairplay ranking; 10) Draw.
(Note: Head-to-head record is used only after all the matches between the teams in question have been played)

==== Results summary ====
Overall								Home						Away					
Pld	W	D	L	GF	GA	GD	Pts	W	D	L	GF	GA	GD	W	D	L	GF	GA	GD
7	5	2	0	14	4	+10	17	5	0	0	12	2	+10	0	2	0	2	2	0

Last updated: 26 September 2023.
Source: PKO Ekstraklasa

==== Results by round ====
Round	1
Ground	
Result	
Position	

Updated to match(es) played on June 2023. Source: PKO Ekstraklasa
A = Away; H = Home; W = Win; D = Draw; L = Loss

==== Matches ====
The league fixtures were announced on 14 June 2023.

21 July 2023 1	Legia Warsaw	3–0	ŁKS Łódź	Warsaw
20:30 CEST	Pekhart 25', 56', 68'			Stadium: Stadion Wojska Polskiego; Attendance: 26,584; Referee: Karol Arys

6 August 2023 3	Legia Warsaw	3–0	Ruch Chorzów	Warsaw
20:00 CEST	Gual 19'; Pekhart 43'; Josué 68'	Report		Stadium: Stadion Wojska Polskiego; Attendance: 25,247; Referee: Paweł Malec

13 August 2023 4	Puszcza Niepołomice	1–1	Legia Warsaw	Kraków
17:30 CEST	Sołowiej 26'	Report	Josué 34'	Stadium: Stadion Cracovii im. Józefa Piłsudskiego; Attendance: 5,313; Referee: Jarosław Przybył

20 August 2023 5	Legia Warsaw	1–0	Korona Kielce	Warsaw
20:00 CEST	Baku 26'			Stadium: Stadion Wojska Polskiego; Attendance: 20,648; Referee: Damian Sylwestrzak

3 September 2023 7	Legia Warsaw	3–1	Widzew Łódź	Warsaw
17:30 CEST	Muçi 5', 75'; Josué 90+7' (pen.)	Report	Sánchez 44'	Stadium: Stadion Wojska Polskiego; Attendance: 27,079; Referee: Tomasz Musiał

16 September 2023 8	Piast Gliwice	1–1	Legia Warsaw	Gliwice
20:00 CEST	Krykun 45+5'	Report	Muçi 69'	Stadium: Stadion Miejski im. Piotra Wieczorka; Attendance: 7,467; Referee: Patryk Gryckiewicz

23 September 2023 9	Legia Warsaw	2–1	Górnik Zabrze	Warsaw
17:30 CEST	Pekhart 8'; Strzałek 90+2'	Report	Musiolik 12'	Stadium: Stadion Wojska Polskiego; Attendance: 24,409; Referee: Szymon Marciniak

27 September 2023 6	Pogoń Szczecin	3–4	Legia Warsaw	Szczecin
20:00 CEST	Grosicki 29'; Koulouris 51'; Bichakhchyan 71'	Report	Pekhart 33'; Jędrzejczyk (yellow card) 45' (red card); Wszołek 69'; Elitim 78'; Kapuadi 84'	Stadium: Stadion Miejski im. Floriana Krygiera; Attendance: 19,551; Referee: Tomasz Musiał

1 October 2023 10	Jagiellonia Białystok	2–0	Legia Warsaw	Białystok
20:00 CEST	Naranjo 13'; Imaz 29'	Report	Burch (yellow card) 49' (yellow-red card) 87'	Stadium: Stadion Miejski w Białymstoku; Attendance: 17,892; Referee: Szymon Marciniak

8 October 2023 11	Legia Warsaw	1–2	Raków Częstochowa	Warsaw
17:30 CEST	Wszołek 45+2'	Report	Kocherhin 26'; Augustyniak 73' (o.g.)	Stadium: Stadion Wojska Polskiego; Attendance: 25,368; Referee: Szymon Marciniak

21 October 2023 12	Śląsk Wrocław	4–0	Legia Warsaw	Wrocław
17:30 CEST	Schwarz 46'; Expósito 71', 77'; Samiec-Talar 73'	Report		Stadium: Stadion Wrocław; Attendance: 39,583; Referee: Piotr Lasyk

29 October 2023 13	Legia Warsaw	1–3	Stal Mielec	Warsaw
15:00 CET	Kramer 89'	Report	Shkurin 38'; Wołkowicz 50'; Hinokio 82'	Stadium: Stadion Wojska Polskiego; Attendance: 23,314; Referee: Karol Arys

5 November 2023 14	Radomiak Radom	0–1	Legia Warsaw	Radom
17:30 CET		Report	Josué 28'	Stadium: Stadion im. Braci Czachorów; Attendance: 8,569; Referee: Łukasz Kuźma

12 November 2023 15	Legia Warsaw	0–0	Lech Poznań	Warsaw
17:30 CET		Report		Stadium: Stadion Wojska Polskiego; Attendance: 29,028; Referee: Piotr Lasyk

25 November 2023 16	Legia Warsaw	2–2	Warta Poznań	Warsaw
20:00 CET	Josué 45+5' (pen.); Muçi 63'	Report	Přikryl 7'; Eppel 40' (pen.)	Stadium: Stadion Wojska Polskiego; Attendance: 25,656; Referee: Damian Kos

3 December 2023 17	Zagłębie Lubin	0–3	Legia Warsaw	Lubin
15:00 CET		Report	Augustyniak 2'; Pankov 4'; Josué 64' (pen.)	Stadium: Stadion Miejski; Attendance: 6,235; Referee: Piotr Lasyk

9 December 2023 18	ŁKS Łódź	1–1	Legia Warsaw	Łódź
15:00 CEST	Zając 45'	Report	Wszołek 51'	Stadium: Stadion Miejski im. Władysława Króla; Attendance: 10,087; Referee: Tomasz Musiał

17 December 2023 19	Legia Warsaw	2–0	Cracovia	Warsaw
17:30 CEST	Kun 46'; Kramer (penalty scored)	Report		Stadium: Stadion Wojska Polskiego; Attendance: 20,116; Referee: Łukasz Kuźma

20 December 2023 2	Cracovia	2–0	Legia Warsaw	Kraków
17:30 CEST	Källman 25'; Källman 57'	Report		Stadium: Stadion Cracovii im. Józefa Piłsudskiego; Attendance: 8,093; Referee: Karol Arys

9 February 2024 20	Ruch Chorzów	0–1	Legia Warsaw	Chorzów
20:30 CEST	Gual 56'	Report		Stadium: Stadion Śląski; Attendance: 37,223; Referee: Damian Sylwestrzak

18 February 2024 21	Legia Warsaw	1–1	Puszcza Niepołomice	Warsaw
15:00 CEST	Rosołek 86'	Report	Koj 42'	Stadium: Stadion Wojska Polskiego; Attendance: 21,341; Referee: Wojciech Myć

25 February 2024 22	Korona Kielce	3–3	Legia Warsaw	Kielce
20:00 CEST	Remacle 45'; Shikavka 69'; Dalmau 90'	Report	Kramer 6', 30'; Kapustka 60'	Stadium: Stadion Miejski; Attendance: 14,141; Referee: Szymon Marciniak

2 March 2024 23	Legia Warsaw	1–1	Pogoń Szczecin	Warsaw
20:00 CEST	Wszołek 49'	Report	Koulouris 60'	Stadium: Stadion Wojska Polskiego; Attendance: 25,126; Referee: Piotr Lasyk

10 March 2024 24	Widzew Łódź	1–0	Legia Warsaw	Łódź
17:30 CEST	Álvarez 90'	Report		Stadium: Stadion Miejski Widzewa; Attendance: 17,481; Referee: Szymon Marciniak

17 March 2024 25	Legia Warsaw	3–1	Piast Gliwice	Warsaw
17:30 CEST	Josué 17'; Gual 41'; Gual 47'	Report	Piasecki 33'	Stadium: Stadion Wojska Polskiego; Attendance: 21,853; Referee: Tomasz Musiał

1 April 2024 26	Górnik Zabrze	1–3	Legia Warsaw	Zabrze
20:00 CEST	Ennali 61'	Report	Pekhart 42'; Kapustka 68'; Josué 75'	Stadium: Arena Zabrze; Attendance: 22,889; Referee: Jarosław Przybył

7 April 2024 27	Legia Warsaw	1–1	Jagiellonia Białystok	Warsaw
17:30 CEST	Gual 30'	Report	Imaz 83'	Stadium: Stadion Wojska Polskiego; Attendance: 27,354; Referee: Szymon Marciniak

13 April 2024 28	Raków Częstochowa	1–1	Legia Warsaw	Częstochowa
20:00 CEST	Crnac 82'	Report	Pekhart 17'	Stadium: Miejski Stadion Piłkarski "Raków"; Attendance: 5,500; Referee: Piotr Lasyk

21 April 2024 29	Legia Warsaw	0–0	Śląsk Wrocław	Warsaw
17:30 CEST		Report		Stadium: Stadion Wojska Polskiego; Attendance: 25,573; Referee: Szymon Marciniak

28 April 2024 30	Stal Mielec	1–3	Legia Warsaw	Mielec
15:00 CEST	Shkurin 39'	Report	Josué 21'; Kapustka 76'; Rosołek 90' (pen.)	Stadium: Stadion Miejski; Attendance: 6,514; Referee: Damian Sylwestrzak

4 May 2024 31	Legia Warsaw	0–3	Radomiak Radom	Warsaw
17:30 CEST		Report	Semedo 66'; Gonçalves 73'; Vušković 79'	Stadium: Stadion Wojska Polskiego; Attendance: 26,326; Referee: Jarosław Przybył

12 May 2024 32	Lech Poznań	1–2	Legia Warsaw	Poznań
17:30 CEST	Pereira 83'	Report	Blažič 15' (o.g.); Salamon 45' (o.g.)	Stadium: Stadion Poznań; Attendance: 40,278; Referee: Szymon Marciniak

19 May 2024 33	Warta Poznań	0–0	Legia Warsaw	Grodzisk Wielkopolski
15:00 CEST	Pankov 26'	Report		Stadium: Stadion Dyskobolii Grodzisk Wielkopolski; Referee: Tomasz Musiał

25 May 2024 34	Legia Warsaw	2–1	Zagłębie Lubin	Warsaw
17:30 CEST	Gual 6'; Gual 40'	Report	Mróz 76'	Stadium: Stadion Wojska Polskiego; Attendance: 25,153; Referee: Patryk Gryckiewicz

=== Polish Cup ===
2 November 2023 Round of 32	GKS Tychy	0–3	Legia Warsaw	Tychy
21:00 CET		Report	Kramer 10'; Gual 13'; Kramer 35'	Stadium: Stadion Miejski w Tychach; Attendance: 13 218; Referee: Jarosław Przybył

6 December 2023 Round of 16	Korona Kielce	2–1	Legia Warsaw	Kielce
21:00 CET	Dalmau 17'; Remacle 120'	Report	Pekhart 42'	Stadium: Suzuki Arena; Attendance: 6 563; Referee: Jarosław Przybył

=== Polish Super Cup ===
15 July 2023 Final	Legia Warsaw	0–0 (6–5 p)	Raków Częstochowa	Częstochowa
20:10 CEST (UTC+2)				Stadium: Miejski Stadion Piłkarski "Raków"; Attendance: 5,500; Referee: Szymon Marciniak (Płock)
	Penalties
	Tudor (penalty scored); Zwoliński (penalty scored); Cebula (penalty missed); Rundić (penalty scored); Papanikolaou (penalty scored); Lederman (penalty scored); Jean Carlos (penalty missed)		(penalty scored) Slisz; (penalty scored) Augustyniak; (penalty scored) Kramer; (penalty missed) Rosołek; (penalty scored) Josué; (penalty scored) Gual; (penalty scored) Nawrocki

=== UEFA Europa Conference League ===
==== Second qualifying round ====
27 July 2023 First leg	FC Ordabasy (Kazakhstan)	2–2	Legia Warsaw	Shymkent, Kazakhstan
17:00 CEST	Sadovsky 13'; Mbodj 48'	Report	Pekhart 63'; Kramer 86'	Stadium: Kazhymukan Munaitpasov Stadium; Attendance: 18,056; Referee: Helgi Mikael Jónasson

3 August 2023 Second leg	Legia Warsaw	3–2 (5-4 agg.)	(Kazakhstan) FC Ordabasy	Warsaw, Poland
21:00 CEST	Wszołek 18'; Ribeiro 42'; Pekhart 71'	Report	Sadovsky 57'; Malyi 84'	Stadium: Stadion Wojska Polskiego; Attendance: 23,517; Referee: Kevin Clancy

==== Third qualifying round ====
10 August 2023 First leg	Legia Warsaw	1–2	FK Austria Wien	Warsaw, Poland
21:00 CEST	Muçi 87'	Report	Huskovic 11'; Huskovic 56'	Stadium: Stadion Wojska Polskiego; Attendance: 26,519; Referee: Pierre Gaillouste

17 August 2023 Second leg	FK Austria Wien	3–5 (5–6 agg.)	Legia Warsaw	Vienna, Austria
19:00 CEST	Gruber 69'; Gruber 83'; Ranftl 90'	Report	Elitim 39'; Gual 45'; Pekhart 58'; Rosołek 87'; Muçi 90'	Stadium: Franz Horr Stadium; Attendance: 10,288; Referee: István Vad

==== Fourth qualifying round ====
24 August 2023 First leg	FC Midtjylland (Denmark)	3–3	Legia Warsaw	Herning, Denmark
20:00 CEST	Juninho 16'; Franculino 34'; Franculino 71'	Report	Gual 26'; Slisz 64'; Kramer 86'	Stadium: MCH Arena; Attendance: 7,228; Referee: Mykola Balakin

31 August 2023 Second leg	Legia Warsaw	1–1 (4–4 agg.) (6–5 p)	FC Midtjylland (Denmark)	Warsaw, Poland
21:00 CEST	Pekhart 53'	Report	Paulinho 70'	Stadium: Stadion Wojska Polskiego; Attendance: 27,312; Referee: Simone Sozza
	Penalties
	Slisz (penalty scored); Muçi (penalty scored); Pankov (penalty scored); Kramer (penalty scored); Josué (penalty scored); Rosołek (penalty scored)		(penalty scored) Cho; (penalty scored) Juninho; (penalty scored) Rømer; (penalty scored) Sørensen; (penalty scored) Dyhr; (penalty missed) Gartenmann

==== Group stage ====
On 1 September 2023, the draw took place for the UEFA Europa League group stage. Legia Warsaw was drawn in Group E, alongside AZ Alkmaar, Aston Villa and Zrinjski Mostar.

Pos	Team	Pld	W	D	L	GF	GA	GD	Pts	Qualification	AVL	LEG	AZ	ZRI
1	(England) Aston Villa	6	4	1	1	12	7	+5	13	Advance to round of 16	—	2–1	2–1	1–0
2	(Poland) Legia Warsaw	6	4	0	2	10	6	+4	12	Advance to knockout round play-offs	3–2	—	2–0	2–0
3	(Netherlands) AZ	6	2	0	4	7	12	−5	6		1–4	1–0	—	1–0
4	(Bosnia and Herzegovina) Zrinjski Mostar	6	1	1	4	6	10	−4	4		1–1	1–2	4–3	—

Source: UEFA
Rules for classification: Group stage tiebreakers

21 September 2023 1	Legia Warsaw	3–2	Aston Villa (England)	Warsaw, Poland
18:45 CEST	Wszołek 3'; Muçi 26', 51'	Report	Durán 6'; Digne 38'	Stadium: Stadion Wojska Polskiego; Attendance: 27,801; Referee: Evángelos Manoúchos; Assistant referees: Konstantinos Nikolaidis, Konstantinos Psárris; Fourth official: Anastasios Papapetrou; Fifth official: Angelos Evangelou; Man of the Match: Ernest Muçi

5 October 2023 2	AZ Alkmaar (Netherlands)	1–0	Legia Warsaw	Alkmaar, Netherlands
21:00 CEST	Pavlidis 52'; Lahdo (red card) 65'	Report		Stadium: AFAS Stadion; Attendance: 14,239; Referee: Nenad Minaković

26 October 2023 3	HŠK Zrinjski Mostar (Bosnia and Herzegovina)	1–2	Legia Warsaw	Mostar, Bosnia and Herzegovina
21:00 CEST	Bilbija 30'	Report	Jakovljević 32' (o.g.); Kramer 62'	Stadium: Stadion pod Bijelim Brijegom; Attendance: 6,300; Referee: Andrei Chivulete

9 November 2023 4	Legia Warsaw	2–0	HŠK Zrinjski Mostar (Bosnia and Herzegovina)	Warsaw, Poland
18:45 CEST	Augustyniak 14'; Josué 30'	Report		Stadium: Stadion Wojska Polskiego; Attendance: 24,616; Referee: Ricardo de Burgos Bengoetxea

30 November 2023 5	Aston Villa (England)	2–1	Legia Warsaw	Aston, England
21:00 CEST	Diaby 4'; Moreno 58'	Report	Muçi 20'	Stadium: Villa Park; Attendance: 37,866; Referee: Marco di Bello

14 December 2023 6	Legia Warsaw	2–0	AZ Alkmaar (Netherlands)	Warsaw, Poland
18:45 CEST	Ribeiro 34'; Kramer 81'	Report		Stadium: Stadion Wojska Polskiego; Attendance: 27,369; Referee: Harald Lechner

==== Knockout round play-offs ====
The draw for the knockout round play-offs was held on 18 December 2023.

15 February 2024 First leg	Molde FK (Norway)	3–2	Legia Warsaw	Reknes, Molde, Norway
18:45 CET (UTC+1)	Gulbrandsen 12'; Gulbrandsen 19'; Kaasa 24'	Report	Josué 63'; Rafał Augustyniak 71'	Stadium: Aker Stadion; Attendance: 11,348; Referee: Enea Jorgji

22 February 2024 Second leg	Legia Warsaw	0–3 (2–6 agg.)	Molde FK (Norway)	Warsaw, Poland
21:00 CET (UTC+1)		Report	Gulbrandsen 2', 67'; Hestad 20'	Stadium: Stadion Wojska Polskiego; Attendance: 27,459; Referee: Harm Osmers

== Statistics ==
=== Appearances and goals ===
As of 24 August 2023.

No.	Pos	Player	Ekstraklasa		Polish Cup		UEFA Europa Conf. League		Total	
No.	Pos	Player	Apps	Goals	Apps	Goals	Apps	Goals	Apps	Goals
Goalkeepers
1	GK	(Poland) Kacper Tobiasz	3	0	0	0	5	0	8	0
30	GK	(Poland) Dominik Hładun	0	0	0	0	0	0	0	0
35	GK	(Poland) Cezary Miszta	0	0	0	0	0	0	0	0
80	GK	(Poland) Jakub Trojanowski	0	0	0	0	0	0	0	0
Defenders
3	DF	(France) Steve Kapuadi	0	0	0	0	0	0	0	0
5	DF	(Portugal) Yuri Ribeiro	4	0	0	0	4	1	8	1
12	DF	(Serbia) Radovan Pankov	2	0	0	0	2	0	4	0
24	DF	(Poland) Jan Ziółkowski	0	0	0	0	0	0	0	0
29	DF	(Mauritius) Lindsay Rose	1	0	0	0	1	0	2	0
55	DF	(Poland) Artur Jędrzejczyk	3	0	0	0	5	0	8	0
Midfielders
8	MF	(Poland) Rafał Augustyniak	3	0	0	0	5	0	8	0
11	MF	(Slovakia) Robert Pich	0	0	0	0	0	0	0	0
13	MF	(Poland) Paweł Wszołek	3	0	0	0	5	1	8	1
14	MF	(Ukraine) Ihor Kharatin	0	0	0	0	0	0	0	0
16	MF	(Albania) Jurgen Çelhaka	4	0	0	0	3	0	7	0
18	MF	(Poland) Patryk Sokołowski	0	0	0	0	0	0	0	0
22	MF	(Colombia) Juergen Elitim	4	0	0	0	5	1	9	1
25	MF	(Japan) Ryoya Morishita	1	0	0	0	0	0	1	0
26	MF	(Poland) Filip Rejczyk	1	0	0	0	0	0	1	0
27	MF	(Portugal) Josué Pesqueira	4	2	0	0	5	1	9	3
28	MF	(Germany) Makana Baku	3	1	0	0	3	0	6	1
33	MF	(Poland) Patryk Kun	4	0	0	0	5	0	9	0
67	MF	(Poland) Bartosz Kapustka	1	0	0	0	0	0	1	0
77	MF	(Poland) Jakub Jędrasik	0	0	0	0	0	0	0	0
86	MF	(Poland) Igor Strzałek	1	0	0	0	0	0	1	0
99	MF	(Poland) Bartosz Slisz	4	0	0	0	5	1	9	1
Forwards
7	FW	(Czech Republic) Tomáš Pekhart	3	4	0	0	5	3	8	7
9	FW	(Slovenia) Blaž Kramer	2	0	0	0	3	2	5	2
19	FW	(Albania) Ernest Muçi	4	0	0	0	5	2	9	2
28	FW	(Spain) Marc Gual	4	1	0	0	5	1	9	2
39	FW	(Poland) Maciej Rosołek	4	0	0	0	5	1	9	1

=== Goalscorers ===
As of 21 July 2023.

Place	Number	Position	Nation	Name	Ekstraklasa	Polish Cup	UEFA Europa Conference League	Total
1	7	FW	(Czech Republic)	Tomas Pekhart	3	0	0	3
TOTALS					0	0	0	0

=== Assists ===
As of 2 July 2023.

Place	Number	Position	Nation	Name	Ekstraklasa	Polish Cup	UEFA Europa Conference League	Total
TOTALS					0	0	0	0

=== Clean sheets ===
As of 2 July 2023.

Place	Number	Nation	Name	Ekstraklasa	Polish Cup	UEFA Europa Conference League	Total
TOTALS				0	0	0	0

=== Disciplinary record ===
As of 2 July 2023.

Number	Position	Nation	Name	Ekstraklasa			Polish Cup			UEFA Europa Conference League			Total		
Number	Position	Nation	Name	Yellow card	(yellow card) (yellow-red card)	Red card	Yellow card	(yellow card) (yellow-red card)	Red card	Yellow card	(yellow card) (yellow-red card)	Red card	Yellow card	(yellow card) (yellow-red card)	Red card
1	GK	(Poland)	Kacper Tobiasz	–									0	0	0
3	DF	(France)	Steve Kapuadi	–									0	0	0
5	DF	(Portugal)	Yuri Ribeiro	–									0	0	0
7	FW	(Czech Republic)	Tomáš Pekhart	–									0	0	0
8	MF	(Poland)	Rafał Augustyniak	–									0	0	0
9	FW	(Slovenia)	Blaž Kramer	–									0	0	0
11	MF	(Slovakia)	Róbert Pich	–									0	0	0
12	DF	(Poland)	Radovan Pankov	–									0	0	0
13	MF	(Poland)	Paweł Wszołek	–									0	0	0
14	MF	(Ukraine)	Ihor Kharatin	–									0	0	0
16	MF	(Albania)	Jurgen Çelhaka	–									0	0	0
18	MF	(Poland)	Patryk Sokołowski	–									0	0	0
22	MF	(Poland)		–									0	0	0
19	FW	(Spain)	Carlitos	–									0	0	0
20	FW	(Albania)	Ernest Muçi	–									0	0	0
22	MF	(Poland)	Juergen Elitim	–									0	0	0
26	MF	(Poland)	Filip Rejczyk	–									0	0	0
27	MF	(Portugal)	Josué	–									0	0	0
28	FW	(Spain)	Marc Gual	–									0	0	0
29	DF	(Mauritius)	Lindsay Rose	–									0	0	0
30	GK	(Poland)	Dominik Hładun	–									0	0	0
31	GK	(Poland)	Cezary Miszta}	–									0	0	0
32	MF	(Germany)	Makana Baku	–									0	0	0
33	MF	(Poland)	Patryk Kun	–									0	0	0
39	FW	(Poland)	Maciej Rosołek	–									0	0	0
55	DF	(Poland)	Artur Jędrzejczyk	–									0	0	0
63	MF	(Poland)	Jakub Kisiel	–									0	0	0
67	MF	(Poland)	Bartosz Kapustka	–									0	0	0
77	MF	(Poland)	Jakub Jędrasik	–									0	0	0
81	GK	(Poland)	Jakub Trojanowski	–									0	0	0
86	MF	(Poland)	Igor Strzałek	–									0	0	0
99	MF	(Poland)	Bartosz Slisz	–									0	0	0
TOTALS				0	0	0	0	0	0	0	0	0	0	0	0

=== Home attendances ===
As of 31 May 2024.

	Matches	Total attendances	Average attendance	Capacity	Highest attendance	Lowest attendance
Ekstraklasa	17	420,175	24,716	79,4%	29,028	20,116
Polish Cup	0	0	0	–	0	0
UEFA Europa Conference League	6	184,593	26,370	84,7%	27,801	23,517
All	23	604,768	25,199	81,0%	29,028	20,116
