= 2022–23 Legia Warsaw season =

Legia Warsaw
2022–23 season
- Chairman: Dariusz Mioduski
- Manager: Kosta Runjaić
- Stadium: Stadion Wojska Polskiego
- Ekstraklasa: 2nd
- Polish Cup: Winners
- Top goalscorer: League: Josué (12); All: Josué (15)
- Highest home attendance: 28,034 v Raków Częstochowa (1 April 2023)
- Average home league attendance: 19,861
- Biggest win: 5–1 v Jagiellonia Białystok (12 May 2023)
- Biggest defeat: 4–0 v Raków Częstochowa (11 September 2022)
Home colours	Away colours	Third colours

The 2022–23 season is Legia Warsaw's 106th season in existence and the club's 75th consecutive season in the top flight of Polish football. In addition to the domestic league, Legia Warsaw participated in this season's edition of the Polish Cup, beating Raków Częstochowa in the final. The season covers the period from 1 July 2022 to 30 June 2023.

== Players ==
=== First-team squad ===
As of 29 August 2022

Note: Flags indicate national team as defined under FIFA eligibility rules; some limited exceptions apply. Players may hold more than one non-FIFA nationality.

No.	Pos.	Nation	Player
1	GK	POL	Kacper Tobiasz
5	DF	POR	Yuri Ribeiro
6	DF	SWE	Mattias Johansson
8	MF	POL	Rafał Augustyniak
9	FW	SLO	Blaž Kramer
11	MF	SVK	Róbert Pich
13	MF	POL	Paweł Wszołek
14	MF	UKR	Ihor Kharatin
16	MF	ALB	Jurgen Çelhaka
17	DF	POL	Maik Nawrocki
18	MF	POL	Patryk Sokołowski
19	FW	ESP	Carlitos
20	FW	ALB	Ernest Muçi

No.	Pos.	Nation	Player
22	MF	POL	Kacper Skibicki
25	DF	SRB	Filip Mladenović
27	MF	POR	Josué (captain)
28	MF	GER	Makana Baku
29	DF	MRI	Lindsay Rose
30	GK	POL	Dominik Hładun
31	GK	POL	Cezary Miszta
39	FW	POL	Maciej Rosołek
55	DF	POL	Artur Jędrzejczyk
63	MF	POL	Jakub Kisiel
67	MF	POL	Bartosz Kapustka
86	MF	POL	Igor Strzałek
99	MF	POL	Bartosz Slisz

=== Out on loan ===
Note: Flags indicate national team as defined under FIFA eligibility rules; some limited exceptions apply. Players may hold more than one non-FIFA nationality.

No.	Pos.	Nation	Player
—	GK	POL	Gabriel Kobylak (at Radomiak Radom until 30 June 2023)
—	GK	POL	Maciej Kikolski (at Pogoń Siedlce until 30 June 2023)
—	DF	ISR	Joel Abu Hanna (at Lechia Gdańsk until 30 June 2023)
—	MF	POL	Bartłomiej Ciepiela (at Stal Mielec until 30 June 2023)
—	MF	POL	Patryk Pierzak (at Górnik Łęczna until 30 June 2023)

== Competitions ==
=== Overview ===
Competition	First match	Last match	Starting round	Record							
Competition	First match	Last match	Starting round	Pld	W	D	L	GF	GA	GD	Win %
Ekstraklasa	15 July 2022	27 May 2023	Matchday 1	17	9	5	3	24	19	+5	52.94
Polish Cup	30 August 2022		First round	3	2	1	0	8	4	+4	66.67
Total				20	11	6	3	32	23	+9	55.00

Last updated: July 2022
Source: Competitions

=== Ekstraklasa ===
==== League table ====
Pos	Team	Pld	W	D	L	GF	GA	GD	Pts	Qualification or relegation
1	Raków Częstochowa (C)	34	23	6	5	63	24	+39	75	Qualification for the Champions League first qualifying round
2	Legia Warsaw	34	19	9	6	57	37	+20	66	Qualification for the Europa Conference League second qualifying round (Note: Since the winner of the 2022–23 Polish Cup qualified for the Europa Conference League based on league position, the third Europa Conference League second qualifying round berth was transferred to the 4th-placed team.)
3	Lech Poznań	34	17	10	7	51	29	+22	61	Qualification for the Europa Conference League second qualifying round
4	Pogoń Szczecin	34	17	9	8	57	46	+11	60	Qualification for the Europa Conference League second qualifying round
5	Piast Gliwice	34	15	8	11	40	31	+9	53	

Source: ekstraklasa.org
Rules for classification: 1) Points; 2) Head-to-head points; 3) Head-to-head goal difference; 4) Goal difference; 5) Goals scored; 6) Number of wins; 7) Number of away wins; 8) Lower number of points based on yellow and red cards (red card = 3 points, yellow card = 1 point, sending-off = 3 points - including 1 point for first yellow card); 9) Fairplay ranking; 10) Draw. (Note: Head-to-head record is used only after all the matches between the teams in question have been played)
(C) Champions

==== Matches ====
The league fixtures were announced on 1 June 2022.

=== Polish Cup ===
30 August 2022 Round 1	Nieciecza	2–3 (a.e.t.)	Legia Warsaw	Nieciecza
20:30 CEST	Błachewicz 53'; Daniel Pietraszkiewicz 86'; Tekijaški (yellow card) 97'; Putivtsev (yellow card) 115'; Bartłomiej Kukułowicz (yellow card) 115' (yellow-red card) 117'; Mešanović (yellow card) 118'; Loska (yellow card) 119'; Zaviyskyi (yellow card) 120'	Report	Carlitos 7' 112'; Rose (yellow card) 45+1'; Josué 90+2' (pen.) (yellow card) 119'; Jędrzejczyk (yellow card) 90+3'; Slisz (yellow card) 116'; Yuri Ribeiro (yellow card) 120+1'	Stadium: Stadion Sportowy Bruk-Bet Termalica; Attendance: 4,258; Referee: (Poland) Jarosław Przybył

18 October 2022 Round of 32	Wisła Płock	0–3	Legia Warsaw	Płock
20:30 CEST	Sekulski (yellow card) 78'; Lesniak (yellow card) 83'; Vallo (yellow card) 90+3'	Report	Muçi 28'; Josué 49'; Nawrocki (yellow card) 58'; Jędrzejczyk (yellow card) 64'; Yuri Ribeiro (yellow card) 90+3'; Kramer 90+5' (yellow card) 90+5'	Stadium: Stadion im. Kazimierza Górskiego; Attendance: 4,100; Referee: (Poland) Damian Sylwestrzak

8 November 2022 Round of 16	Lechia Gdańsk	2–2 (a.e.t.) (2–4 p)	Legia Warsaw	Gdańsk
20:30 CEST	Durmuş 41'; Zwoliński 93' (yellow card) 109'	Report	Mladenović (yellow card) 44'; Josué 52' (pen.) (yellow card) 107'; Rose 117'	Stadium: Polsat Plus Arena Gdańsk; Attendance: 9,101; Referee: (Poland) Tomasz Musial

28 February 2023 Quarter Finals	Lechia Zielona Góra	0–3	Legia Warsaw	Zielona Góra
13:00 CET	Przemyslaw Mycan (yellow card) 38'; Mykyta Loboda (yellow card) 45+1'; Rafal Ostrowski (yellow card) 77'	Report	Nawrocki (yellow card) 6'; Pekhart 8'; Kapustka 43'; Carlitos 71'	Stadium: Stadion MOSiR; Attendance: 4,999; Referee: (Poland) Damian Kos

4 April 2023 Semi Finals	KKS 1925 Kalisz	0–1	Legia Warsaw	Kalisz
20:30 CET	Adrian Łuszkiewicz (yellow card) 12'; Nikodem Zawistowski (yellow card) 90+3' (yellow-red card) 90+3'; Jakub Głaz (yellow card) 90+4'	Report	Igor Strzałek 2'; Jędrzejczyk (yellow card) 56'; Josué (yellow card) 90+3'	Stadium: Stadion Miejski; Attendance: 8,166; Referee: (Poland) Jarosław Przybył

2 May 2023 Final	Legia Warsaw	0–0 (a.e.t.) (6–5 p)	Raków Częstochowa	Warsaw
16:00 CET	Yuri Ribeiro (red card) 6'; Josué (yellow card) 7'; Wszołek (yellow card) 10'; Pekhart (yellow card) 59'; Augustyniak (yellow card) 79'; Kapustka (yellow card) 80'; Tobiasz (yellow card) 114'; Mladenović (yellow card) 120+1' (red card) 120+10'	Report	Arsenić (yellow card) 13'; Gutkovskis (yellow card) 27'; Papanikolaou (yellow card) 110'; Jean Carlos (red card) 120+10'	Stadium: Stadion Narodowy; Attendance: 44,701; Referee: (Poland) Piotr Lasyk
