= Przemysław Małecki =

Polish footballer and manager

Personal information
- Date of birth: 20 January 1983 (age 43)
- Place of birth: Poznań, Poland

Youth career
- Amica Wronki

Senior career*
Years	Team	Apps	(Gls)
2002–2004	Amica Wronki II		
2004–2006	Warta Poznań		
2005–2006	Sparta Oborniki		
2006–2009	Polonia Nowy Tomyśl		
2009–2016	Błękitni Wronki		

Managerial career
- 2015–2017: Lech Poznań (youth coordinator)
- 2017: Zagłębie Lubin U19
- 2017–2018: Poland U16
- 2018–2019: Poland U17
- * Club domestic league appearances and goals

Przemysław Małecki (born 20 January 1983) is a Polish professional football manager and former player who was most recently the assistant manager of Serie A club Udinese. In the past, he was in charge of the Poland national under-16 and under-17 teams.

== Coaching career ==
On 29 December 2024, Małecki officially served as Udinese's head coach during the Serie A match against Torino, stepping in for Kosta Runjaić who had fallen ill. It was the first time in 32 years that a Pole had managed a team in an Italian top league match; the previous Polish coach to serve as a head coach in Serie A was Zbigniew Boniek, who was in charge of Bari in 1992.

== Honours ==
=== Assistant manager ===
Legia Warsaw

- Ekstraklasa: 2020–21; runner-up: 2022–23
- Polish Cup: 2022–23
- Polish Super Cup: 2023; runner-up: 2021
