= Kacper Tobiasz =

Polish footballer

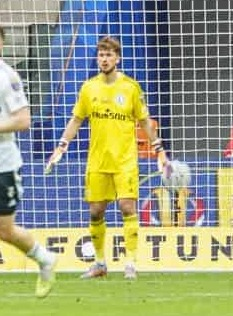
- Tobiasz with Legia Warsaw in 2023

Personal information
- Date of birth: 4 November 2002 (age 24)
- Place of birth: Płock, Poland
- Height: 1.91 m (6 ft 3 in)
- Position: Goalkeeper

Team information
- Current team: Gaziantep
- Number: 25

Youth career
- –2012: SEMP Ursynów
- 2012–2013: Legia Warsaw
- 2013–2019: SEMP Ursynów
- 2016–2019: Legia Warsaw

Senior career*
Years	Team	Apps	(Gls)
2019–2026	Legia Warsaw II	33	(0)
2021–2026	Legia Warsaw	98	(0)
2022	→ Stomil Olsztyn (loan)	13	(0)
2026–	Gaziantep	9	(0)

International career
2021–2022	Poland U20	4	(0)
2022–2025	Poland U21	16	(0)
- * Club domestic league appearances and goals as of 00:12, 18 November 2026 (UTC)

Kacper Tobiasz (born 4 November 2002) is a Polish professional footballer who plays as a goalkeeper for Süper Lig club Gaziantep.

== Club career ==
=== First stint at Legia ===
He played his first match at the Ekstraklasa tier on 24 July 2021 against Wisła Płock.

=== Loan to Stomil ===
On 25 February 2022, Legia agreed to loan Tobiasz to I liga club Stomil Olsztyn. He made his debut on 26 February in a 1–1 draw away to Korona Kielce at the Municipal Stadium.

=== Breakthrough ===
Having completed the spring round in Olsztyn, he returned to Warsaw and became Legia's first goalkeeper for the 2022–23 season.

On 2 May 2023, he was named top player of the 2022–23 Polish Cup final match against Raków Częstochowa, won by Legia following a penalty shootout.

In the 2023–24 season, he contributed to Legia's UEFA Europa Conference League campaign, with the club advancing from their group following wins against Aston Villa, AZ Alkmaar and Zrinjski Mostar. Until February 2024, he continued to feature regularly in the first team in the league as well. However, after several months of weaker form, and directly after losing a UECL play-off match against Norwegian side Molde (0–3) on 22 February, he forfeited his place in the starting line-up to Dominik Hładun. On 3 March 2024, he appeared in a match for their III liga reserves, during which he saved a penalty kick. He rejoined the first team on 12 May 2024 for a blockbuster 2–1 away win over Lech Poznań.

Tobiasz started the 2025–26 season as Legia's first-choice goalkeeper before losing his spot to Otto Hindrich in February 2026. On 22 May 2026, Legia announced that Tobiasz's contract would not be renewed, and he departed the club at the end of the season.

=== Gaziantep ===
On 29 July 2026, Tobiasz joined Turkish club Gaziantep on a three-year contract.

== Career statistics ==
As of match played 24 October 2026

Appearances and goals by club, season and competition
Club	Season	League			National cup (Note: Includes Polish Cup)		Europe		Other		Total	
Club	Season	Division	Apps	Goals	Apps	Goals	Apps	Goals	Apps	Goals	Apps	Goals
Legia Warsaw II	2018–19	III liga, gr. I	5	0	0	0	—		—		5	0
Legia Warsaw II	2020–21	III liga, gr. I	20	0	0	0	—		—		20	0
Legia Warsaw II	2021–22	III liga, gr. I	2	0	0	0	—		—		2	0
Legia Warsaw II	2023–24	III liga, gr. I	3	0	0	0	—		—		3	0
Legia Warsaw II	2025–26	III liga, gr. I	3	0	0	0	—		—		3	0
Legia Warsaw II	Total		33	0	0	0	—		0	0	33	0
Legia Warsaw	2021–22	Ekstraklasa	4	0	0	0	0	0	0	0	4	0
Legia Warsaw	2022–23	Ekstraklasa	27	0	1	0	—		0	0	28	0
Legia Warsaw	2023–24	Ekstraklasa	23	0	2	0	12 (Note: Appearances in UEFA Conference League)	0	1 (Note: Appearance in Polish Super Cup)	0	38	0
Legia Warsaw	2024–25	Ekstraklasa	22	0	2	0	9	0	—		33	0
Legia Warsaw	2025–26	Ekstraklasa	22	0	0	0	13 (Note: Six appearances in UEFA Europa League, seven appearances in UEFA Conference League)	0	1	0	36	0
Legia Warsaw	Total		98	0	5	0	34	0	2	0	139	0
Stomil Olsztyn (loan)	2021–22	I liga	13	0	—		—		—		13	0
Gaziantep	2026–27	Süper Lig	9	0	0	0	—		—		9	0
Career total			153	0	5	0	34	0	2	0	194	0

== Honours ==
Legia Warsaw

- Polish Cup: 2022–23, 2024–25
- Polish Super Cup: 2023, 2025

Legia Warsaw II

- III liga, group I: 2025–26
