= Bartosz Slisz =

Polish footballer (born 1999)

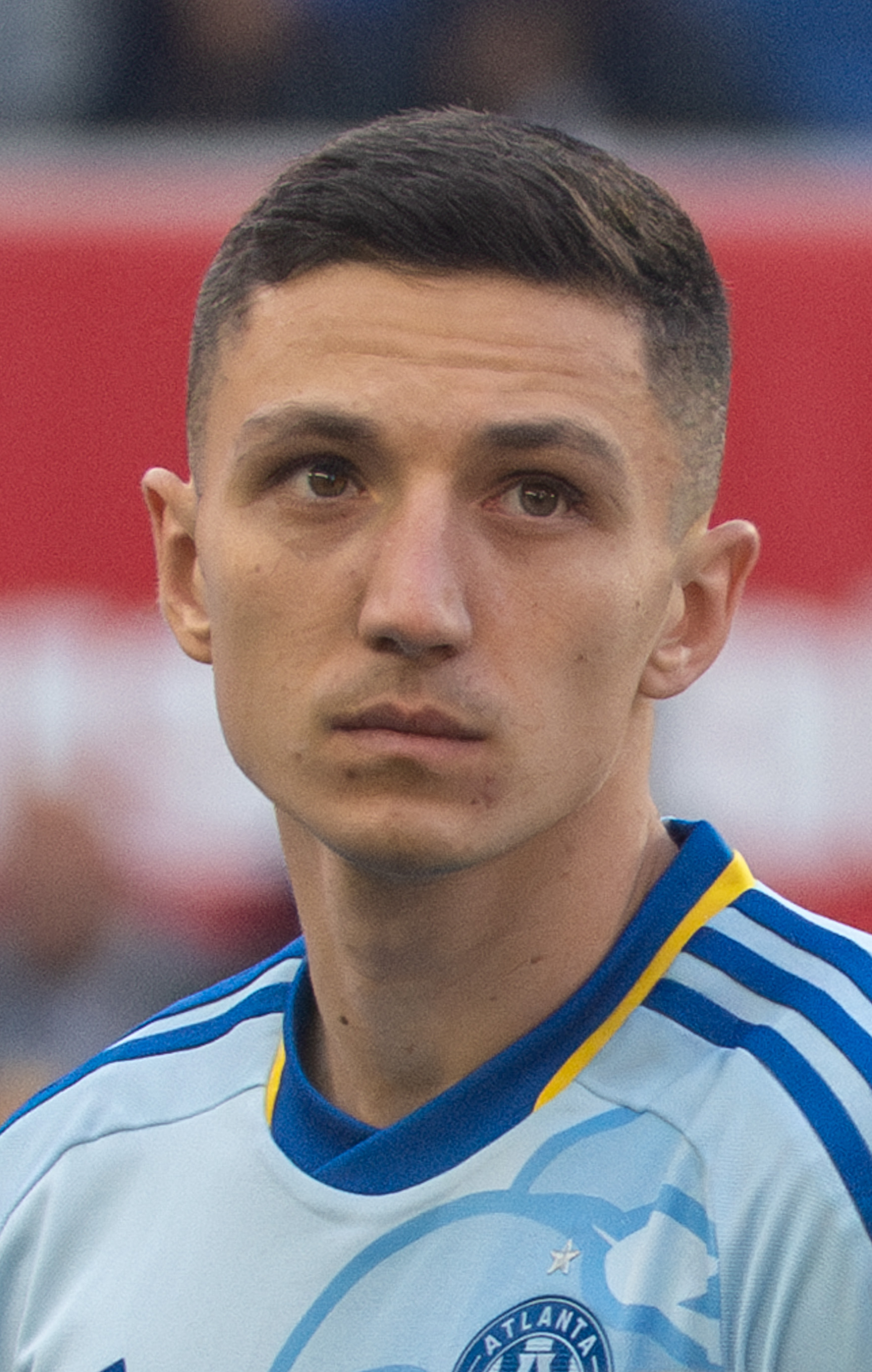
- Slisz in 2025 with Atlanta United

Personal information
- Full name: Bartosz Piotr Slisz
- Date of birth: 29 March 1999 (age 27)
- Place of birth: Rybnik, Poland
- Height: 1.80 m (5 ft 11 in)
- Position: Midfielder

Team information
- Current team: Brøndby
- Number: 99

Youth career
- 2012–2014: RKP Rybnik
- 2014–2015: ROW Rybnik

Senior career*
Years	Team	Apps	(Gls)
2015–2017	ROW Rybnik	25	(3)
2017–2020	Zagłębie Lubin	48	(2)
2020–2024	Legia Warsaw	116	(3)
2024–2026	Atlanta United	57	(3)
2026–	Brøndby	21	(1)

International career^{‡}
2016–2017	Poland U18	7	(0)
2018–2019	Poland U20	14	(0)
2019–2020	Poland U21	7	(0)
2021–	Poland	26	(1)
- * Club domestic league appearances and goals as of 20:57, 20 September 2026 (UTC) ‡ National team caps and goals as of 22:40, 2 October 2026 (UTC)

Bartosz Piotr Slisz (born 29 March 1999) is a Polish professional footballer who plays as a midfielder for Danish Superliga club Brøndby and the Poland national team.

== Club career ==
=== Early career ===
Slisz started his football career at his local club RKP Rybnik in 2012. In 2015, Slisz was a ROW Rybnik player where he stayed until 2017.

=== Zagłębie Lubin and Legia Warsaw ===
In 2017, Slisz signed for Zagłębie Lubin. On 28 February 2020, he signed a four-and-a-half-year contract with Legia Warsaw. The team from Warsaw paid €1.8 million for the transfer, which was at the time the highest transfer fee ever paid by any Ekstraklasa club.

=== Atlanta United ===
In January 2024, he signed for Major League Soccer club Atlanta United on a four-year contract.

=== Brøndby ===
On 8 January 2026, Danish Superliga club Brøndby announced the signing of Slisz on a three-and-a-half-year contract, set to run until June 2029. Slisz stated that he joined the club with the ambition of competing for domestic titles and European qualification, citing Brøndby's stature within Scandinavian football as a key factor in his decision.

He made his competitive debut on 8 February in a 0–0 home draw against Randers, playing the full match.

== International career ==
Slisz made his debut for the Poland national team on 5 September 2021 in a World Cup qualifier against San Marino, a 7–1 away victory. He substituted Jakub Moder at half-time.

He was called up for his first international tournament in June 2024, making Poland's final roster for UEFA Euro 2024 in Germany.

== Career statistics ==
=== Club ===
As of match played 17 September 2026

Appearances and goals by club, season and competition
Club	Season	League			National cup (Note: Includes Polish Cup, U.S. Open Cup, Danish Cup)		Continental		Other		Total	
Club	Season	Division	Apps	Goals	Apps	Goals	Apps	Goals	Apps	Goals	Apps	Goals
ROW Rybnik	2015–16	II liga	11	2	0	0	—		—		11	2
ROW Rybnik	2016–17	II liga	14	1	2	0	—		—		16	1
ROW Rybnik	Total		25	3	2	0	—		—		27	3
Zagłębie Lubin	2017–18	Ekstraklasa	5	0	0	0	—		—		5	0
Zagłębie Lubin	2018–19	Ekstraklasa	22	0	0	0	—		—		22	0
Zagłębie Lubin	2019–20	Ekstraklasa	21	2	3	0	—		—		24	2
Zagłębie Lubin	Total		48	2	3	0	—		—		51	2
Legia Warsaw	2019–20	Ekstraklasa	7	0	2	0	—		—		9	0
Legia Warsaw	2020–21	Ekstraklasa	27	2	4	1	4 (Note: Two appearances in UEFA Champions League, two appearances in UEFA Europa League)	0	0	0	35	3
Legia Warsaw	2021–22	Ekstraklasa	32	1	4	0	13 (Note: Six appearances in UEFA Champions League, seven appearances in UEFA Europa League)	0	1 (Note: Appearance in Polish Super Cup)	0	50	1
Legia Warsaw	2022–23	Ekstraklasa	32	0	6	0	—		—		38	0
Legia Warsaw	2023–24	Ekstraklasa	18	0	2	0	12 (Note: Appearances in UEFA Europa Conference League)	1	1	0	33	1
Legia Warsaw	Total		116	3	18	1	29	1	2	0	165	5
Atlanta United	2024	Major League Soccer	28	1	2	0	—		7 (Note: Five appearances and one goal in MLS Cup playoffs, two appearances in Leagues Cup)	1	37	2
Atlanta United	2025	Major League Soccer	29	2	—		—		3 (Note: Appearances in Leagues Cup)	0	32	2
Atlanta United	Total		57	3	2	0	—		10	1	69	4
Brøndby	2025–26	Danish Superliga	13	0	0	0	—		1 (Note: Appearance in Danish Superliga play-off)	0	14	0
Brøndby	2026–27	Danish Superliga	8	1	1	0	—		—		9	1
Brøndby	Total		21	1	1	0	—		1	0	23	1
Career total			267	12	26	1	29	1	13	1	335	15

=== International ===
As of match played 2 October 2026

National team	Year	Apps	Goals
Poland
Poland	2021	1	0
Poland	2023	5	0
Poland	2024	8	0
Poland	2025	7	1
Poland	2026	5	0
Total		26	1

Scores and results list Poland goal tally first, score column indicates score after each Slisz goal

List of international goals scored by Bartosz Slisz
No.	Date	Venue	Opponent	Score	Result	Competition
1	6 June 2025	Stadion Śląski, Chorzów, Poland	Moldova	2–0	2–0	Friendly

== Honours ==
Zagłębie Lubin II

- IV liga Lower Silesia West: 2016–17

Legia Warsaw

- Ekstraklasa: 2019–20, 2020–21
- Polish Cup: 2022–23
- Polish Super Cup: 2023

Individual

- Ekstraklasa Young Player of the Month: September 2019
