= Yuri Ribeiro =

Footballer (born 1997)

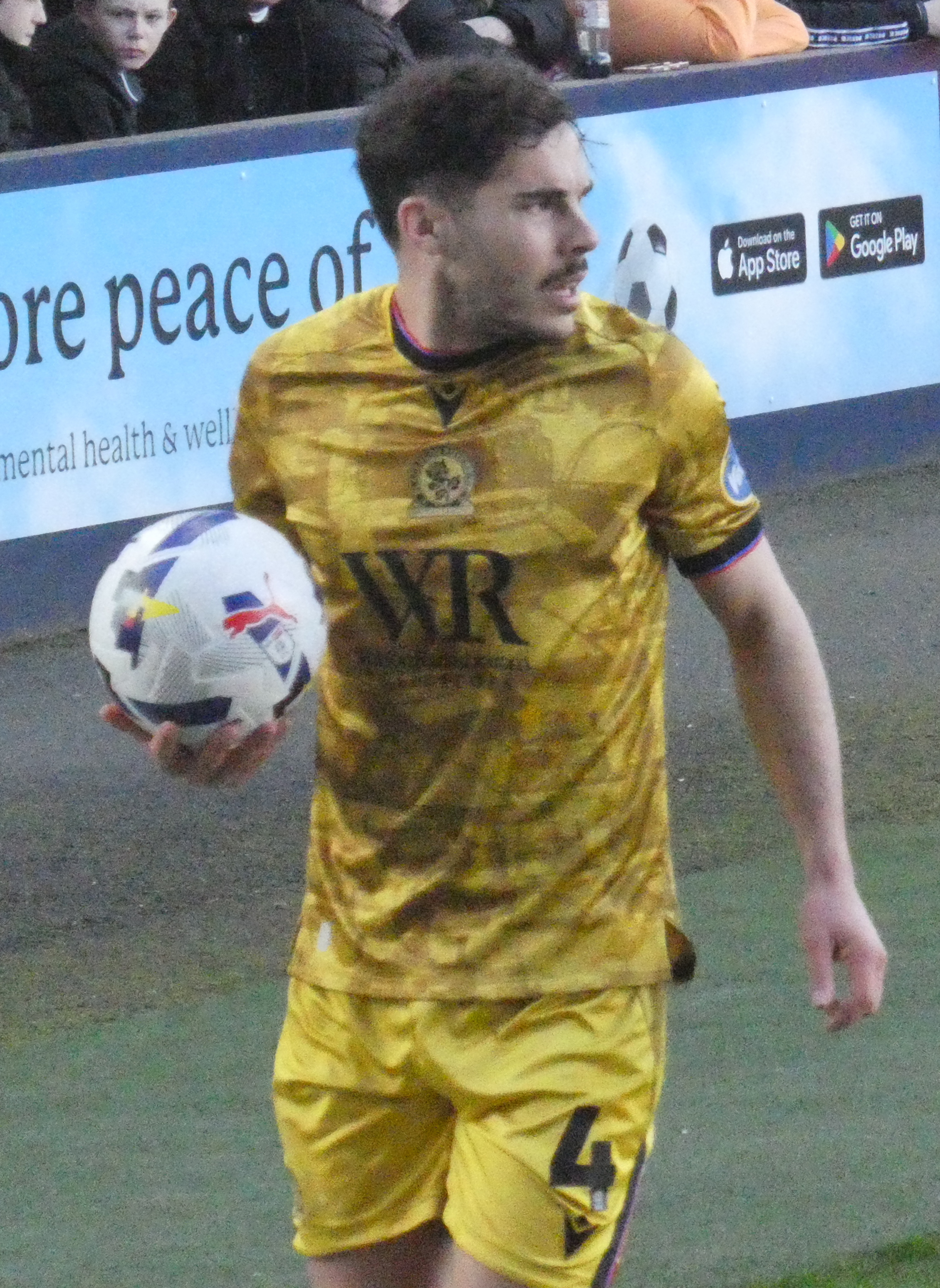
- Ribeiro with Blackburn Rovers in 2026

Personal information
- Full name: Yuri Oliveira Ribeiro
- Date of birth: 24 January 1997 (age 29)
- Place of birth: Switzerland
- Height: 1.80 m (5 ft 11 in)
- Positions: Left-back; wing-back

Team information
- Current team: Blackburn Rovers
- Number: 4

Youth career
- 2006–2010: Escola Os Craques
- 2010–2012: Braga
- 2012–2016: Benfica

Senior career*
Years	Team	Apps	(Gls)
2015–2017	Benfica B	47	(0)
2016–2019	Benfica	0	(0)
2017–2018	→ Rio Ave (loan)	25	(1)
2019–2021	Nottingham Forest	52	(1)
2021–2024	Legia Warsaw	63	(1)
2024–2025	Braga	9	(0)
2025–	Blackburn Rovers	43	(0)

International career
2012–2013	Portugal U16	10	(0)
2013–2014	Portugal U17	15	(1)
2015	Portugal U18	5	(0)
2015–2016	Portugal U19	13	(0)
2016–2017	Portugal U20	10	(0)
2016–2018	Portugal U21	13	(0)
- * Club domestic league appearances and goals as of 17:03, 12 September 2026 (UTC)

Yuri Oliveira Ribeiro (born 24 January 1997) is a Portuguese professional footballer who plays as a left-back or wing-back for EFL Championship club Blackburn Rovers.

== Club career ==
=== Benfica ===
Born in Switzerland to Portuguese migrant parents, Ribeiro moved to Vieira do Minho, Braga District at the age of two. He started playing football at Escola Os Craques, joined Braga's academy four years later and, at the age of 13, signed for Benfica, where he went on to finish his development and win the 2013 national championship.

Ribeiro made his senior debut for Benfica's reserves on 29 May 2015, starting in a 2–1 home win over Vitória de Guimarães B in the Segunda Liga. He started the following season as a backup to Pedro Rebocho, but was called to action when the latter injured himself at Varzim.

Ribeiro first appeared in official matches with the first team on 14 December 2016, playing the entire 3–0 away victory over Real Massamá in the round of 16 of the Taça de Portugal. On 3 January 2017, he also started against Vizela in the Taça da Liga (4–0 win at the Estádio da Luz in the group stage).

On 30 June 2017, Ribeiro joined Rio Ave on a season-long loan deal. His maiden appearance in the Primeira Liga took place on 7 August, in a 1–0 home defeat of Belenenses. He totalled 29 games in his year in Vila do Conde, and scored a first career goal in a 2–0 home win over Boavista the following 21 January.

Ribeiro returned to Benfica for the 2018–19 campaign, extending his contract with the club for an additional five years. On 14 February 2019, he made his European debut as they beat Galatasaray 2–1 in the first leg of the round of 32 of the UEFA Europa League, their first-ever victory in Turkey.

=== Nottingham Forest ===
On 8 July 2019, Ribeiro joined English side Nottingham Forest on a permanent deal, along with Benfica teammate Alfa Semedo who also moved to the City Ground but on a season-long loan. He made his debut on 13 August in the first round of the EFL Cup, playing the full 90 minutes of a 3–0 home win over Fleetwood Town, and went on to make the starting position his own ahead of Jack Robinson.

Ribeiro scored his first goal for the club on 15 December 2020, in a 2–0 victory against Sheffield Wednesday. He was released the following June.

=== Legia Warsaw ===
On 23 August 2021, Ribeiro signed a three-year contract with Legia Warsaw. He was released at the end of 2023–24.

=== Braga ===
On 23 August 2024, Ribeiro returned to Braga 12 years after leaving, agreeing to a two-year deal. He took part in 15 games during his short spell, leaving as a free agent.

=== Blackburn Rovers ===
Ribeiro returned to the EFL Championship on 3 February 2025, on a four-month contact at Blackburn Rovers. Two months later, he agreed to an extension until June 2027.

== International career ==
Ribeiro represented Portugal in the 2014 UEFA European Under-17 Championship, helping his team reach the semi-finals, where they lost to eventual winners England. On 7 July 2016, he was selected by the under-19 side for that year's European Championship in Germany.

On 2 September 2016, Ribeiro won his first cap for the under-21s at 19, featuring the full 90 minutes in a 0–0 home draw with Israel in the 2017 European Championship qualifiers.

== Personal life ==
Ribeiro was named after Youri Djorkaeff after his parents saw the French international play. His father was a goalkeeper, and his older brother, Romeu, also played for Benfica and Portugal at youth level.

== Career statistics ==
As of match played 12 September 2026

Appearances and goals by club, season and competition
Club	Season	League			National cup (Note: Includes Taça de Portugal, FA Cup, Polish Cup)		League cup (Note: Includes Taça da Liga, EFL Cup)		Europe		Total	
Club	Season	Division	Apps	Goals	Apps	Goals	Apps	Goals	Apps	Goals	Apps	Goals
Benfica B	2014–15	Segunda Liga	1	0	—		—		—		1	0
Benfica B	2015–16	LigaPro	16	0	—		—		—		16	0
Benfica B	2016–17	LigaPro	30	0	—		—		—		30	0
Benfica B	Total		47	0	—		—		—		47	0
Benfica	2016–17	Primeira Liga	0	0	1	0	1	0	0	0	2	0
Benfica	2018–19	Primeira Liga	0	0	2	0	3	0	2 (Note: Appearances in UEFA Europa League)	0	7	0
Benfica	Total		0	0	3	0	4	0	2	0	9	0
Rio Ave (loan)	2017–18	Primeira Liga	25	1	3	0	1	0	—		29	1
Nottingham Forest	2019–20	Championship	27	0	1	0	3	0	—		31	0
Nottingham Forest	2020–21	Championship	25	1	0	0	1	0	—		26	1
Nottingham Forest	Total		52	1	1	0	4	0	—		57	1
Legia Warsaw	2021–22	Ekstraklasa	12	0	3	0	—		3	0	18	0
Legia Warsaw	2022–23	Ekstraklasa	24	1	5	0	—		—		29	1
Legia Warsaw	2023–24	Ekstraklasa	27	0	0	0	—		12 (Note: Eleven appearances in UEFA Europa Conference League, and one appearance in Polish Super Cup)	2	39	2
Legia Warsaw	Total		63	1	8	0	—		15	2	86	3
Legia Warsaw II	2021–22	III liga, gr. I	1	0	—		—		—		1	0
Braga	2024–25	Primeira Liga	9	0	2	0	1	0	3	0	15	0
Blackburn Rovers	2024–25	Championship	15	0	1	0	0	0	—		16	0
Blackburn Rovers	2025–26	Championship	22	0	1	0	0	0	—		23	0
Blackburn Rovers	2026–27	Championship	6	0	0	0	0	0	—		6	0
Blackburn Rovers	Total		43	0	2	0	0	0	—		45	0
Career total			240	3	19	0	10	0	20	2	289	5

== Honours ==
Benfica

- Taça de Portugal: 2016–17

Legia Warsaw

- Polish Cup: 2022–23
- Polish Super Cup: 2023
