= Maciej Rosołek =

Polish footballer

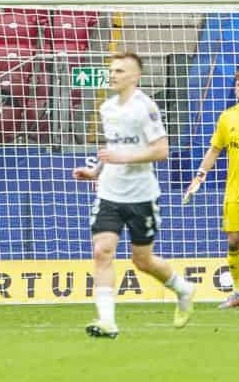
- Rosołek playing for Legia Warsaw in 2023

Personal information
- Date of birth: 2 September 2001 (age 25)
- Place of birth: Siedlce, Poland
- Height: 1.83 m (6 ft 0 in)
- Position: Forward

Team information
- Current team: Pogoń Siedlce
- Number: 9

Youth career
- –2015: Pogoń Siedlce
- 2015–2018: Legia Warsaw

Senior career*
Years	Team	Apps	(Gls)
2018–2024	Legia Warsaw II	34	(16)
2019–2024	Legia Warsaw	101	(13)
2021	→ Arka Gdynia (loan)	17	(10)
2021–2022	→ Arka Gdynia (loan)	14	(1)
2024–2025	Piast Gliwice	32	(4)
2025–2026	GKS Katowice	8	(0)
2026	→ Pogoń Siedlce (loan)	15	(2)
2026–	Pogoń Siedlce	0	(0)

International career
2015–2016	Poland U15	2	(0)
2016–2017	Poland U16	3	(0)
2019	Poland U19	1	(0)
2021	Poland U20	1	(0)
2020	Poland U21	3	(0)
- * Club domestic league appearances and goals as of 20:27, 26 May 2026 (UTC)

Maciej Rosołek (born 2 September 2001) is a Polish professional footballer who plays as a forward for I liga club Pogoń Siedlce.

== Career ==
Rosołek started his career in the youth setup of Pogoń Siedlce. In 2015, he moved to Legia Warsaw. At the start of the 2021–22 season, he joined Arka Gdynia on loan for the second time, which ended on 3 January 2022. In his first match after returning to Legia, on 4 February, he scored the opening goal in a 3–1 victory at Zagłębie Lubin.

On 25 July 2024, Rosołek moved to another Ekstraklasa club Piast Gliwice on a one-year deal, with an option for another year, reuniting with his former Legia manager Aleksandar Vuković.

On 16 June 2025, Rosołek joined fellow top-flight club GKS Katowice on a free transfer, signing a two-year contract with an option for a further year.

On 4 February 2026, he returned to his hometown club Pogoń Siedlce on loan for the remainder of the season. On 27 June 2026, Pogoń announced they have signed Rosołek on a permanent basis.

== Career statistics ==
As of match played 24 May 2026

Appearances and goals by club, season and competition
Club	Season	League			Polish Cup		Continental		Other		Total	
Club	Season	Division	Apps	Goals	Apps	Goals	Apps	Goals	Apps	Goals	Apps	Goals
Legia Warsaw II	2017–18	III liga, gr. I	1	0	—		—		—		1	0
Legia Warsaw II	2018–19	III liga, gr. I	18	7	—		—		—		18	7
Legia Warsaw II	2019–20	III liga, gr. I	13	7	2	0	—		—		15	7
Legia Warsaw II	2023–24	III liga, gr. I	2	2	0	0	—		—		2	2
Legia Warsaw II	Total		34	16	2	0	—		—		36	16
Legia Warsaw	2019–20	Ekstraklasa	14	3	3	0	—		—		17	3
Legia Warsaw	2020–21	Ekstraklasa	8	0	1	3	2 (Note: Appearances in UEFA Champions League)	0	—		11	3
Legia Warsaw	2021–22	Ekstraklasa	16	3	2	0	1 (Note: Appearance(s) in UEFA Europa League)	0	—		19	3
Legia Warsaw	2022–23	Ekstraklasa	34	5	6	0	—		—		40	5
Legia Warsaw	2023–24	Ekstraklasa	29	2	2	0	14 (Note: Appearances in UEFA Europa Conference League)	1	1 (Note: Appearance in Polish Super Cup)	0	46	3
Legia Warsaw	Total		101	13	14	3	17	1	1	0	133	17
Arka Gdynia (loan)	2020–21	I liga	16	10	4	1	—		1 (Note: Appearance in I liga promotion play-offs)	0	21	11
Arka Gdynia (loan)	2021–22	I liga	14	1	2	0	—		—		16	1
Piast Gliwice	2024–25	Ekstraklasa	32	4	4	1	—		—		36	5
GKS Katowice	2025–26	Ekstraklasa	8	0	1	0	—		—		9	0
Pogoń Siedlce (loan)	2025–26	I liga	15	2	—		—		—		15	2
Pogoń Siedlce	2026–27	I liga	0	0	0	0	—		—		0	0
Pogoń Siedlce	Total		15	2	0	0	—		—		15	2
Career total			220	46	27	5	17	1	2	0	266	52

== Honours ==
Legia Warsaw

- Ekstraklasa: 2019–20, 2020–21
- Polish Cup: 2022–23
- Polish Super Cup: 2023

Legia Warsaw II

- Polish Cup (Masovia regionals): 2018–19

Individual

- Ekstraklasa Young Player of the Month: May 2023
