= Juergen Elitim =

Colombian footballer (born 1999)

Personal information
- Full name: Juergen Farid Elitim Sepúlveda
- Date of birth: 13 July 1999 (age 27)
- Place of birth: Cartagena, Colombia
- Height: 1.73 m (5 ft 8 in)
- Position: Midfielder

Team information
- Current team: Bursaspor
- Number: 6

Youth career
- 2007–2014: Club Cyclones
- 2014–2017: Leones
- 2017–2018: Granada

Senior career*
| Years | Team | Apps | (Gls) |
| 2016 | Leones | 2 | (0) |
| 2018–2019 | Granada B | 0 | (0) |
| 2018–2019 | → Marbella (loan) | 33 | (2) |
| 2019–2023 | Watford | 0 | (0) |
| 2019–2020 | → Marbella (loan) | 22 | (1) |
| 2020–2021 | → Ponferradina (loan) | 41 | (0) |
| 2021–2022 | → Deportivo La Coruña (loan) | 36 | (1) |
| 2022–2023 | → Racing Santander (loan) | 29 | (2) |
| 2023–2026 | Legia Warsaw | 73 | (3) |
| 2026– | Bursaspor | 0 | (0) |
- * Club domestic league appearances and goals as of 00:02, 24 May 2026 (UTC)

Juergen Farid Elitim Sepúlveda (born 13 July 1999) is a Colombian professional footballer who plays as a midfielder for TFF 1. Lig club Bursaspor.

== Career ==
Born in Cartagena, Elitim moved to Cali at the age of 12, joining Club JC FC Cyclones' youth setup. After impressing in a tournament at the age of 15, he agreed to a deal with Granada CF, but was unable to join the club until the age of 18; he was assigned to Leones FC instead.

Elitim made his first team debut for Leones on 9 October 2016, aged 17, by playing the last eight minutes of a 2–1 Categoría Primera B home win against Tigres. In July 2017, he moved to Granada after his 18th birthday.

On 22 August 2018, Elitim joined Segunda División B side Marbella FC for the 2018–19 season. On 31 July of the following year, after having his federative rights assigned to Watford, his loan was renewed for a further year.

On 9 August 2020, Elitim agreed to a one-year loan deal with Segunda División side Ponferradina. He made his professional debut on 20 September, coming on as a late substitute for Yuri de Souza in a 2–0 away win against Albacete Balompié.

On 9 July 2021, Elitim returned to Spain, joining Deportivo de La Coruña on a season-long loan deal. On 2 July of the following year, he moved to Racing de Santander on a one-year loan deal.

On 27 June 2023, he signed a three-year contract with the Polish Ekstraklasa side Legia Warsaw.

On 23 May 2026, Elitim signed with Turkish side Bursaspor on a free transfer.

== Personal life ==
Elitim is of Lebanese and Turkish descent through his father's side.

== Career statistics ==
As of match played 23 May 2026

Appearances and goals by club, season and competition
| Club | Season | League | | | National cup (Note: Includes Copa del Rey, Polish Cup) | | Continental | | Other | | Total | |
| Club | Season | Division | Apps | Goals | Apps | Goals | Apps | Goals | Apps | Goals | Apps | Goals |
|---|---|---|---|---|---|---|---|---|---|---|---|---|
| Leones | 2016 | Categoría Primera B | 2 | 0 | — | | — | | — | | 2 | 0 |
| Marbella (loan) | 2018–19 | Segunda División B | 33 | 2 | 1 | 0 | — | | — | | 34 | 2 |
| Marbella (loan) | 2019–20 | Segunda División B | 22 | 1 | 2 | 0 | — | | — | | 24 | 1 |
| Ponferradina (loan) | 2020–21 | Segunda División | 41 | 0 | 0 | 0 | — | | — | | 41 | 0 |
| Deportivo La Coruña (loan) | 2021–22 | Primera Federación | 36 | 1 | 0 | 0 | — | | — | | 36 | 1 |
| Racing Santander (loan) | 2022–23 | Segunda División | 29 | 2 | 0 | 0 | — | | — | | 29 | 2 |
| Legia Warsaw | 2023–24 | Ekstraklasa | 33 | 1 | 2 | 0 | 14 (Note: Appearances in UEFA Conference League) | 1 | 1 (Note: Appearance in Polish Super Cup) | 0 | 50 | 2 |
| Legia Warsaw | 2024–25 | Ekstraklasa | 15 | 0 | 3 | 0 | 4 | 0 | — | | 22 | 0 |
| Legia Warsaw | 2025–26 | Ekstraklasa | 25 | 2 | 1 | 0 | 9 (Note: Four appearances and one goal in UEFA Europa League, three appearances and one goal in UEFA Conference League) | 2 | 1 | 0 | 36 | 4 |
| Legia Warsaw | Total | | 73 | 3 | 6 | 0 | 27 | 3 | 2 | 0 | 108 | 6 |
| Career total | | | 236 | 9 | 9 | 0 | 27 | 3 | 2 | 0 | 274 | 12 |

== Honours ==
Legia Warsaw

- Polish Cup: 2024–25
- Polish Super Cup: 2023, 2025
