= Makana Baku =

German footballer (born 1998)

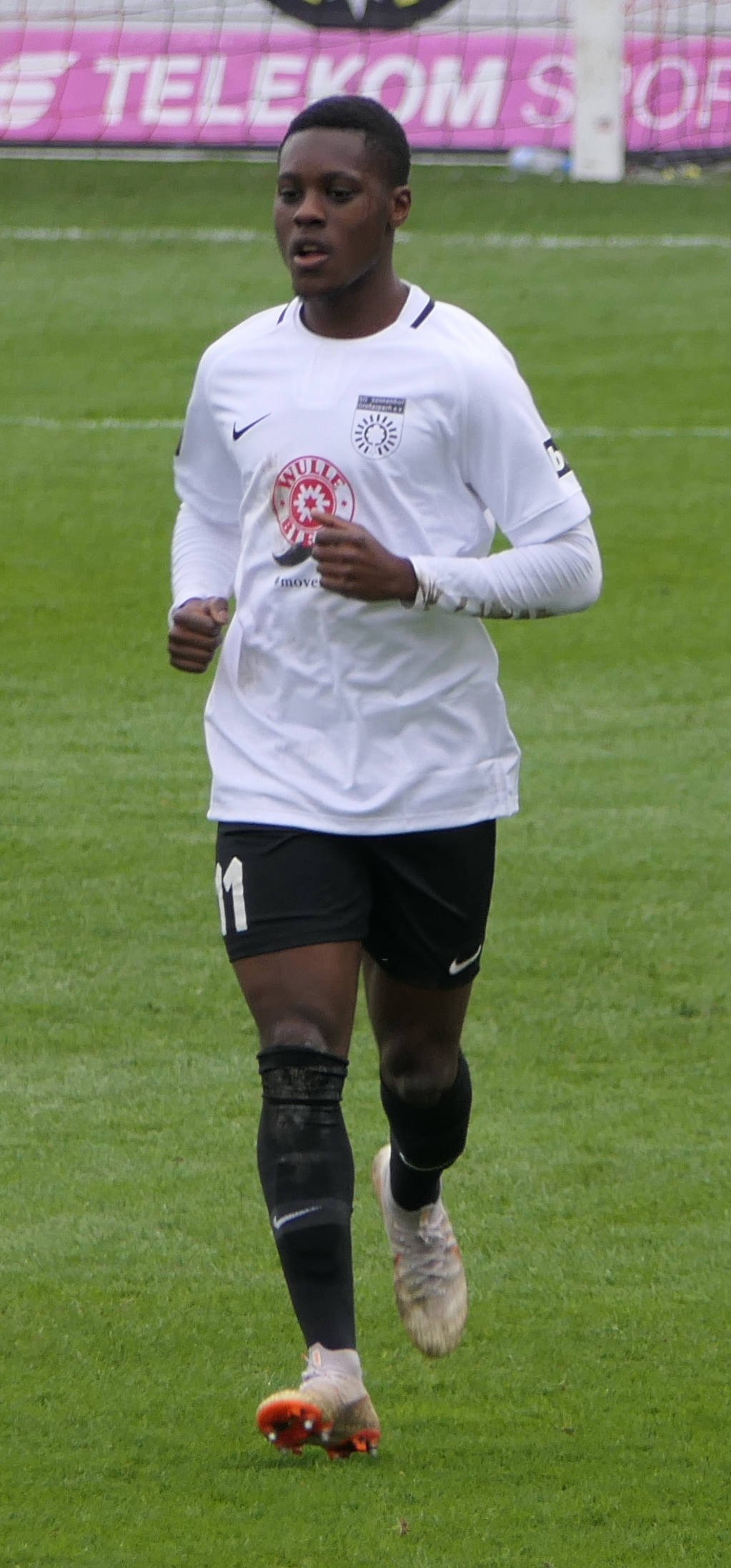
- Baku with Sonnenhof Großaspach in 2018

Personal information
- Full name: Makana Nsimba Baku
- Date of birth: 8 April 1998 (age 28)
- Place of birth: Mainz, Germany
- Height: 1.77 m (5 ft 10 in)
- Position: Left winger

Team information
- Current team: Kocaelispor
- Number: 32

Youth career
- 2007–2015: Mainz 05
- 2015–2016: SV Gonsenheim
- 2016–2017: Mainz 05

Senior career*
Years	Team	Apps	(Gls)
2015–2016	SV Gonsenheim	7	(1)
2017–2019	Sonnenhof Großaspach	66	(5)
2019–2021	Holstein Kiel	20	(4)
2021	→ Warta Poznań (loan)	13	(6)
2021–2022	Göztepe	20	(2)
2022–2024	Legia Warsaw	29	(1)
2024	→ OFI (loan)	14	(2)
2024–2026	Atromitos	66	(15)
2026–	Kocaelispor	8	(0)

International career
2018	Germany U20	2	(0)
2019	Germany U21	3	(0)
- * Club domestic league appearances and goals as of 18 October 2026

Makana Nsimba Baku (born 8 April 1998) is a German professional footballer who plays as a left winger for Süper Lig club Kocaelispor.

== Club career ==
In June 2019, it was announced Baku would join 2. Bundesliga side Holstein Kiel from SG Sonnenhof Großaspach for an undisclosed transfer fee having agreed a three-year contract.

On 24 July 2024, Atromitos officially announced the signing of Baku on a two-year deal, with Legia Warsaw retaining a resale rate.

== International career ==
Baku is available to play for either Germany or DR Congo. He appeared in five games for Germany's youth teams, though never made any major appearance for the senior team.

== Personal life ==
Born in Germany, Baku is of Congolese descent. He is the twin brother of the footballer Ridle Baku.

== Career statistics ==
As of match played 10 June 2025

Appearances and goals by club, season and competition
Club	Season	League			National cup (Note: Includes Greek Cup, Polish Cup, Turkish Cup)		Continental		Other		Total	
Club	Season	Division	Apps	Goals	Apps	Goals	Apps	Goals	Apps	Goals	Apps	Goals
SV Gonsenheim	2015–16	Oberliga	7	1	—		—		—		7	1
Sonnenhof Großaspach	2017–18	3. Liga	28	1	—		—		3 (Note: Appearances in the Württemberg Cup)	0	31	1
Sonnenhof Großaspach	2018–19	3. Liga	38	4	—		—		3	1	41	5
Sonnenhof Großaspach	Total		66	5	—		—		6	1	72	6
Holstein Kiel	2019–20	2. Bundesliga	20	4	2	3	—		—		22	7
Warta Poznań (loan)	2020–21	Ekstraklasa	13	6	—		—		—		13	6
Göztepe	2021–22	Süper Lig	20	2	2	1	—		—		22	3
Legia Warsaw	2022–23	Ekstraklasa	22	0	5	0	—		—		27	0
Legia Warsaw	2023–24	Ekstraklasa	7	1	—		5 (Note: Appearances in UEFA Europa Conference League)	0	1 (Note: Appearance in Polish Super Cup)	0	13	1
Legia Warsaw	Total		29	1	5	0	5	0	1	0	40	1
OFI (loan)	2023–24	Super League Greece	14	2	3	0	—		—		17	2
Atromitos	2024–25	Super League Greece	31	5	3	2	—		—		34	7
Career total			200	26	15	6	5	0	7	1	227	33

== Honours ==
Legia Warsaw

- Polish Cup: 2022–23
- Polish Super Cup: 2023
