= Blaž Kramer =

Slovenian footballer (born 1996)

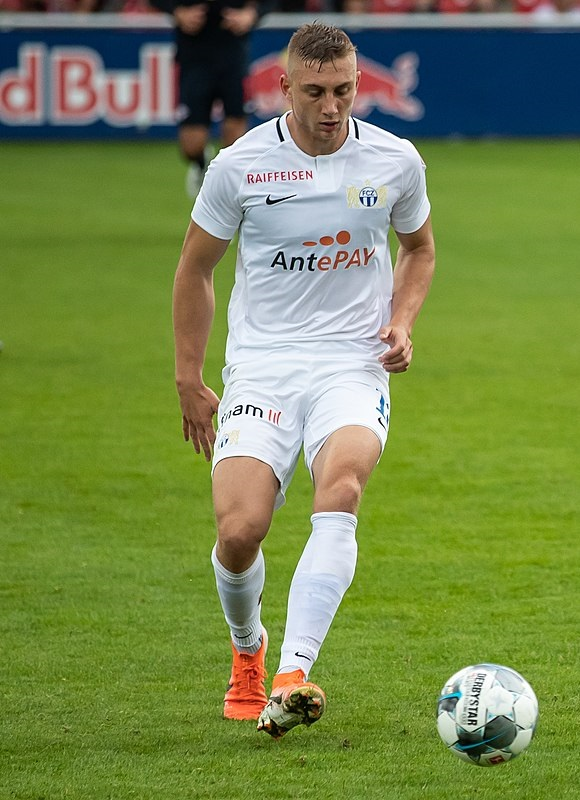
- Kramer with FC Zürich in 2019

Personal information
- Date of birth: 1 June 1996 (age 30)
- Place of birth: Celje, Slovenia
- Height: 1.91 m (6 ft 3 in)
- Position: Forward

Team information
- Current team: Celje
- Number: 9

Youth career
- Zreče
- –2015: Šampion

Senior career*
Years	Team	Apps	(Gls)
2014–2016	Šampion	32	(25)
2016–2017	Aluminij	28	(6)
2017–2019	VfL Wolfsburg II	46	(27)
2019–2022	Zürich	86	(21)
2022–2024	Legia Warsaw	36	(8)
2023	Legia Warsaw II	4	(1)
2024–2026	Konyaspor	43	(14)
2025–2026	→ Al-Okhdood (loan)	13	(1)
2026–	Celje	1	(0)

International career^{‡}
2014	Slovenia U19	4	(0)
2017	Slovenia U21	2	(0)
2020–	Slovenia	10	(0)
- * Club domestic league appearances and goals as of 6 September 2026 ‡ National team caps and goals as of 10 June 2025

Blaž Kramer (born 1 June 1996) is a Slovenian professional footballer who plays as a forward for Slovenian PrvaLiga club Celje.

== Club career ==
=== FC Zürich ===
After a spell with VfL Wolfsburg II, Kramer joined FC Zürich on a three-year contract on 19 June 2019. One month later, on 21 July, he made his debut for the club in a 4–0 Swiss Super League loss to Lugano. With Zürich, he won the league title in the 2021–22 season, the club's first title in 13 years.

=== Legia Warsaw ===
On 25 May 2022, Kramer signed a three-year contract with Polish Ekstraklasa side Legia Warsaw. After being assigned a squad number 9, he debuted on 11 September 2022 in a 4–0 away loss against Raków Częstochowa. He scored his first goal for Legia in a Polish Cup match on 18 October, a 3–0 away victory over Wisła Płock. Throughout the 2022–23 season, he scored two goals, and also won the 2022–23 Polish Cup.

On 2 November 2023, in a 3–0 Polish Cup victory over GKS Tychy, Kramer scored his first brace with Legia. He repeated the feat four months later, on 25 February 2024, in a 3–3 away draw against Korona Kielce. On 14 December 2023, he scored in a 2–0 home win over AZ Alkmaar in the UEFA Europa Conference League group stage to help Legia progress to the knockout stage. During the 2023–24 season, Kramer scored ten goals in total.

=== Konyaspor ===
In July 2024, Kramer successfully underwent medical tests at Turkish Süper Lig side Konyaspor. On 13 September 2024, he moved there on a three-year deal for a reported transfer fee of €700,000.

== International career ==
Kramer made his debut for Slovenia on 6 September 2020 in a UEFA Nations League game against Moldova, where he substituted Andraž Šporar in the 85th minute of the 1–0 home victory.

== Career statistics ==
=== Club ===
As of match played 29 August 2024

Appearances and goals by club, season and competition
Club	Season	League			National cup (Note: Includes Slovenian Cup, Swiss Cup, Polish Cup)		Europe		Other		Total	
Club	Season	Division	Apps	Goals	Apps	Goals	Apps	Goals	Apps	Goals	Apps	Goals
Aluminij	2016–17	Slovenian PrvaLiga	28	6	3	0	—		—		31	6
VfL Wolfsburg II	2017–18	Regionalliga	30	19	—		—		—		30	19
VfL Wolfsburg II	2018–19	Regionalliga	16	8	—		—		2 (Note: Appearances in promotion playoffs)	0	18	8
VfL Wolfsburg II	Total		46	27	—		—		2	0	48	27
Zürich	2019–20	Swiss Super League	31	10	2	0	—		—		33	10
Zürich	2020–21	Swiss Super League	32	7	1	0	—		—		33	7
Zürich	2021–22	Swiss Super League	23	4	0	0	—		—		23	4
Zürich	Total		86	21	3	0	—		—		89	21
Legia Warsaw	2022–23	Ekstraklasa	12	1	2	1	—		—		14	2
Legia Warsaw	2023–24	Ekstraklasa	18	4	2	2	11 (Note: Appearances in UEFA Conference League)	4	1 (Note: Appearance in Polish Super Cup)	0	32	10
Legia Warsaw	2024–25	Ekstraklasa	6	3	0	0	5	2	—		11	5
Legia Warsaw	Total		36	8	4	3	16	6	1	0	57	17
Legia Warsaw II	2022–23	III liga, gr. I	3	1	0	0	—		—		3	1
Legia Warsaw II	2023–24	III liga, gr. I	1	0	0	0	—		—		1	0
Legia Warsaw II	Total		4	1	0	0	—		—		4	1
Career total			200	63	10	3	16	6	3	0	229	72

== Honours ==
FC Zürich

- Swiss Super League: 2021–22

Legia Warsaw

- Polish Cup: 2022–23
- Polish Super Cup: 2023
