= Lindsay Rose =

Footballer (born 1992)

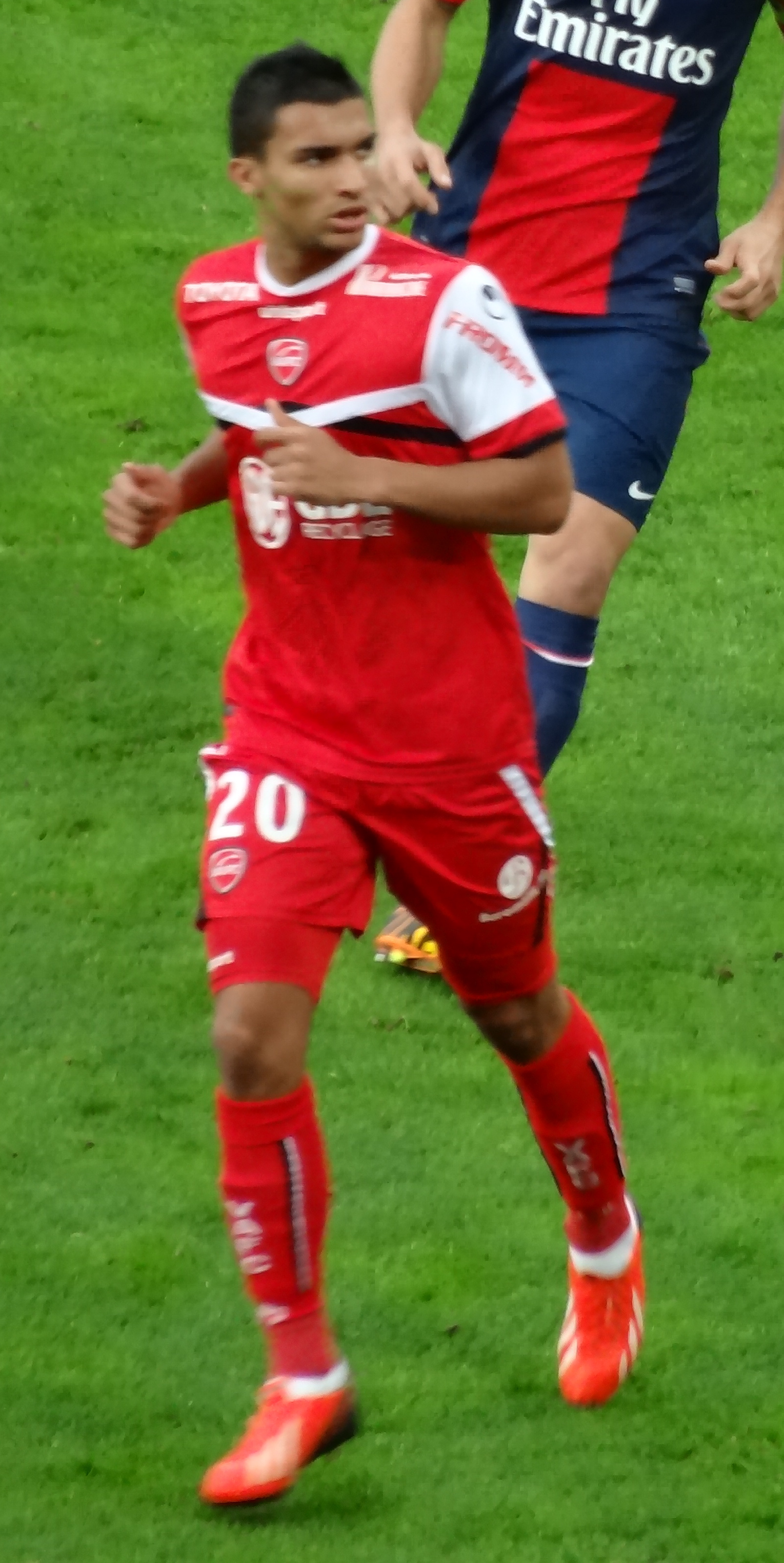
- Rose with VAFC in 2013

Personal information
- Full name: Lindsay Marc Rose
- Date of birth: 8 February 1992 (age 34)
- Place of birth: Rennes, France
- Height: 1.84 m (6 ft 0 in)
- Positions: Centre back; right back

Team information
- Current team: Sepsi OSK
- Number: 31

Youth career
- 1998–2000: CPB Rennes
- 2000–2008: Rennes
- 2008–2010: Laval

Senior career*
Years	Team	Apps	(Gls)
2010–2013	Laval	69	(3)
2013–2014	Valenciennes	24	(1)
2014–2016	Lyon	16	(0)
2014–2015	Lyon B	5	(0)
2016	→ Lorient (loan)	10	(0)
2016–2019	Lorient	27	(5)
2016–2019	Lorient B	6	(0)
2017	→ Bastia (loan)	9	(0)
2019	→ Aris (loan)	13	(2)
2019–2021	Aris	68	(5)
2021–2024	Legia Warsaw	37	(1)
2021–2023	Legia Warsaw II	10	(0)
2024–2026	Aris	44	(0)
2026–	Sepsi OSK	8	(1)

International career^{‡}
2008	Mauritius U17		
2010	France U18	8	(1)
2010–2011	France U19	10	(1)
2011–2013	France U20	10	(0)
2013–2014	France U21	4	(1)
2018–	Mauritius	29	(2)
- * Club domestic league appearances and goals as of 26 October 2026 ‡ National team caps and goals as of 27 March 2026

Lindsay Marc Rose (born 8 February 1992) is a professional footballer who plays as a centre back or a right back for Liga I club Sepsi OSK. Born in France, he plays for the Mauritius national team, which he captains.

He was a France youth international and previously played at under-18 and under-19 level.

== Club career ==
=== Youth career and Laval ===
Rose began his career in 1998 with hometown club CPB Rennes. After training there for three years, he moved to professional club Rennes. After spending nine years in the club's academy, Rose was released without Rennes offering him a professional contract. Soon after, he signed on with Ligue 2 club Laval, appearing for the club's reserve team in the Championnat de France amateur 2 numerous times.

Rose made his professional debut on 9 April 2010 in a league match against Châteauroux. On 21 May 2010, Rose signed his first professional contract agreeing to a three-year deal with Laval.

=== Valenciennes and Lyon ===
On 17 July 2014, after a season-and-a-half at Ligue 1 side Valenciennes, he signed a four-year deal with Olympique Lyonnais prior to the 2014–15 season.

=== Aris ===
On 24 January 2019, Rose joined Aris on a six-month loan deal from Lorient. On 3 March 2019, he scored his first goal for the club, sealing a 2–0 home win against AEK Athens, in the battle for a Europa League ticket. On 31 March 2019, he scored equalizing the score in an eventual 3–1 home win against OFI.

On 29 June 2019, Aris announced the signing of Rose on a three-year contract. On 2 November 2019, he scored with an excellent finesse shot in a 1–1 away draw against Panionios.

On 4 January 2020, he scored with a close range header, in a massive 4–2 home win against PAOK, at the Derby of Thessaloniki. Fifteen days later, he scored in a disappointing 4–2 away loss against Olympiacos.

Rose impressed with his performances throughout the 2019–20 season, In late April, Aris reportedly rejected an offer from Crvena Zvezda, estimated to be around €600,000.

=== Legia Warsaw ===
In July 2021, even though he was part of the summer pre-season preparation of Aris, he was transferred to Polish Ekstraklasa club Legia Warsaw, expressing, though, that his leave is only an "au revoir" and not a final goodbye, after stating he will return one day to the club of Aris. On 28 October 2021, he scored his premier goal in the Polish Cup game against Świt Szczecin.

On 29 December 2023, amidst rumours linking him with a return to Aris, Rose terminated his contract with Legia by mutual consent.

== International career ==
Rose's first international experience came with the Mauritius U-17 team in 2008, playing several games for the team in various competitions. Soon after, he was called up to the France U-18 team and, a year later, to the France U-19 team. He aspired to play for the France national team internationally, but said that he was definitely open to playing with the Mauritius national team should the former not work out.

Rose was called up to the Brittany national team in 2016 by Raymond Domenech.

In October 2017, Rose pledged his international allegiance to Mauritius. He was called up for a friendly match against Equatorial Guinea on 8 October, but withdrew due to an injury. He made his senior debut for Mauritius in a 1–0 friendly win over Macau on 22 March 2018.

== Career statistics ==
=== Club ===
As of 26 October 2026

Appearances and goals by club, season and competition
Club	Season	League			National cup (Note: Includes Coupe de France, Greek Cup, Polish Cup, Cupa României)		League cup (Note: Includes Coupe de la Ligue)		Europe		Other		Total	
Club	Season	Division	Apps	Goals	Apps	Goals	Apps	Goals	Apps	Goals	Apps	Goals	Apps	Goals
Laval	2009–10	Ligue 2	1	0	0	0	—		—		—		1	0
Laval	2010–11	Ligue 2	22	1	1	0	0	0	—		—		23	1
Laval	2011–12	Ligue 2	29	2	2	0	1	0	—		—		32	2
Laval	2012–13	Ligue 2	17	0	1	0	1	0	—		—		19	0
Laval	Total		69	3	4	0	2	0	—		—		75	3
Valenciennes	2012–13	Ligue 1	15	1	—		—		—		—		15	1
Valenciennes	2013–14	Ligue 1	9	0	0	0	0	0	—		—		9	0
Valenciennes	Total		24	1	0	0	0	0	—		—		24	1
Lyon	2014–15	Ligue 1	15	0	1	0	0	0	2 (Note: Appearances in UEFA Europa League)	0	—		18	0
Lyon	2015–16	Ligue 1	1	0	0	0	0	0	0	0	0	0	1	0
Lyon	Total		16	0	1	0	0	0	2	0	0	0	19	0
Lyon B	2014–15	CFA	3	0	—		—		—		—		3	0
Lyon B	2015–16	CFA	2	0	—		—		—		—		2	0
Lyon B	Total		5	0	—		—		—		—		5	0
Lorient (loan)	2015–16	Ligue 1	10	0	2	0	—		—		—		12	0
Lorient	2016–17	Ligue 1	3	0	1	0	0	0	—		—		4	0
Lorient	2017–18	Ligue 2	20	4	3	0	2	0	—		—		25	4
Lorient	2018–19	Ligue 2	4	1	1	0	4	0	—		—		9	1
Lorient	Total		27	5	5	0	6	0	—		—		38	5
Lorient B	2016–17	CFA	4	0	—		—		—		—		4	0
Lorient B	2017–18	Championnat National 2	1	0	—		—		—		—		2	0
Lorient B	2018–19	Championnat National 2	1	0	—		—		—		—		2	0
Lorient B	Total		6	0	—		—		—		—		6	0
Bastia (loan)	2016–17	Ligue 1	9	0	—		—		—		—		9	0
Aris (loan)	2018–19	Super League Greece	13	2	—		—		—		—		13	2
Aris	2019–20	Super League Greece	34	3	6	0	—		4	0	—		44	3
Aris	2020–21	Super League Greece	34	2	4	0	—		1	0	—		39	2
Aris	Total		68	5	10	0	—		5	0	—		83	5
Legia Warsaw	2021–22	Ekstraklasa	19	0	3	1	—		1	0	1 (Note: Appearance in Polish Super Cup)	0	24	1
Legia Warsaw	2022–23	Ekstraklasa	17	1	3	1	—		—		—		20	2
Legia Warsaw	2023–24	Ekstraklasa	1	0	0	0	—		1 (Note: Appearance in UEFA Europa Conference League)	0	0	0	2	0
Legia Warsaw	Total		37	1	6	2	—		2	0	1	0	46	3
Legia Warsaw II	2021–22	III liga	1	0	—		—		—		—		1	0
Legia Warsaw II	2022–23	III liga	2	0	—		—		—		—		2	0
Legia Warsaw II	2023–24	III liga	7	0	2	1	—		—		—		9	1
Legia Warsaw II	Total		10	0	2	1	—		—		—		12	1
Aris	2023–24	Super League Greece	17	0	3	0	—		—		—		20	0
Aris	2024–25	Super League Greece	8	0	1	0	—		—		—		9	0
Aris	2025–26	Super League Greece	19	0	6	1	—		0	0	—		25	1
Aris	Total		44	0	10	1	—		0	0	—		54	1
Sepsi OSK	2026–27	Liga I	8	1	1	0	—		—		—		9	1
Career total			344	18	40	3	8	0	9	0	1	0	402	21

=== International ===
As of match played 31 March 2026

Appearances and goals by national team and year
National team	Year	Apps	Goals
Mauritius	2018	3	0
Mauritius	2019	2	0
Mauritius	2020	0	0
Mauritius	2021	0	0
Mauritius	2022	2	0
Mauritius	2023	5	0
Mauritius	2024	6	1
Mauritius	2025	9	1
Mauritius	2026	2	0
Total		29	2

Scores and results list Mauritius goal tally first, score column indicates score after each Rose goal.

List of international goals scored by Lindsay Rose
No.	Date	Venue	Opponent	Score	Result	Competition
1	11 June 2024	Complexe Sportif de Côte d'Or, Saint Pierre, Mauritius	Eswatini	2–0	2–1	2026 FIFA World Cup qualification
2	23 March 2025	Mbombela Stadium, Mbombela, South Africa	Eswatini	1–2	3–3	2023 Africa Cup of Nations qualification

== Honours ==
Lyon

- Trophée des Champions runner-up: 2015

Legia Warsaw

- Polish Cup: 2022–23

Aris

- Greek Cup runner-up: 2023–24
