= Rafał Augustyniak =

Polish footballer (born 1993)

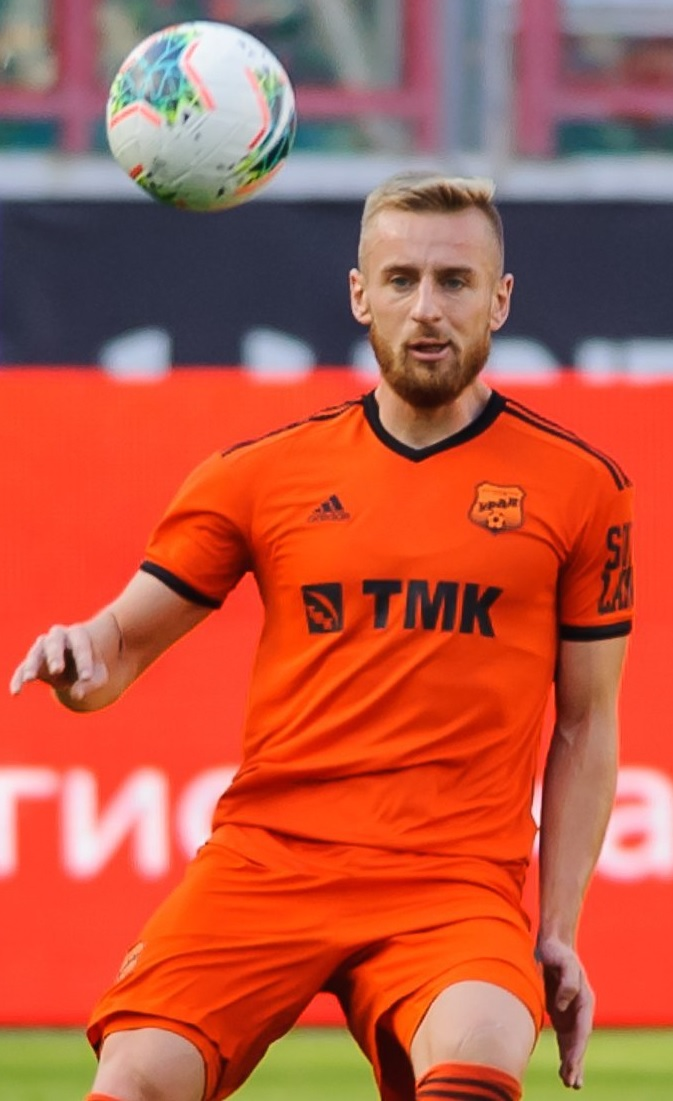
- Augustyniak with FC Ural Yekaterinburg in 2019

Personal information
- Date of birth: 14 October 1993 (age 33)
- Place of birth: Zduńska Wola, Poland
- Height: 1.85 m (6 ft 1 in)
- Position: Defensive midfielder

Team information
- Current team: Legia Warsaw
- Number: 8

Youth career
- 2005–2007: MKS MOS Zduńska Wola
- 2007–2009: Pogoń Zduńska Wola
- 2011–2012: Widzew Łódź

Senior career*
Years	Team	Apps	(Gls)
2009–2011	Pogoń Zduńska Wola		
2012–2015	Widzew Łódź	37	(2)
2013–2014	Widzew Łódź II	8	(1)
2012–2013	→ Pogoń Siedlce (loan)	29	(1)
2015–2018	Jagiellonia Białystok	5	(0)
2015–2018	Jagiellonia Białystok II	19	(3)
2016	→ Pogoń Siedlce (loan)	15	(0)
2016–2017	→ Wigry Suwałki (loan)	28	(1)
2017–2018	→ Miedź Legnica (loan)	29	(3)
2018–2019	Miedź Legnica	22	(2)
2018	Miedź Legnica II	2	(0)
2019–2022	Ural Yekaterinburg	80	(8)
2022–	Legia Warsaw	105	(14)
2023	Legia Warsaw II	1	(0)

International career
2021	Poland	1	(0)
- * Club domestic league appearances and goals as of 11:38, 15 September 2026 (UTC)

Rafał Augustyniak (born 14 October 1993) is a Polish professional footballer who plays as a defensive midfielder for Ekstraklasa club Legia Warsaw.

== Club career ==
In 2018, he signed for Miedź Legnica.

On 21 June 2019, he signed with the Russian Premier League club FC Ural Yekaterinburg. Augustyniak left Ural on 31 May 2022 as his contract expired.

On 30 July 2022, he returned to Polish Ekstraklasa, signing a three-year deal with Legia Warsaw.

== International career ==
Augustyniak was called up for the 2022 FIFA World Cup qualification matches against Hungary, Andorra and England. He made his debut for Poland against England on 31 March 2021, coming in as a substitute.

== Career statistics ==
=== Club ===
As of match played 23 May 2026

Appearances and goals by club, season and competition
Club	Season	League			National cup (Note: Includes Polish Cup, Russian Cup)		Continental		Other		Total	
Club	Season	Division	Apps	Goals	Apps	Goals	Apps	Goals	Apps	Goals	Apps	Goals
Pogoń Zduńska Wola	2009–10	III liga, gr. A	3	0	—		—		—		3	0
Pogoń Siedlce (loan)	2012–13	II liga	29	1	2	0	—		—		31	1
Widzew Łódź	2013–14	Ekstraklasa	19	0	1	0	—		—		20	0
Widzew Łódź	2014–15	I liga	18	2	1	0	—		—		19	2
Widzew Łódź	Total		37	2	2	0	0	0	0	0	39	2
Widzew Łódź II	2013–14	III liga, gr. A	8	1	—		—		—		8	1
Jagiellonia Białystok	2014–15	Ekstraklasa	1	0	—		—		—		1	0
Jagiellonia Białystok	2015–16	Ekstraklasa	4	0	1	0	0	0	—		5	0
Jagiellonia Białystok	Total		5	0	1	0	0	0	0	0	6	0
Jagiellonia Białystok II	2014–15	III liga, gr. B	10	1	—		—		—		10	1
Jagiellonia Białystok II	2015–16	III liga, gr. B	9	2	—		—		—		9	2
Jagiellonia Białystok II	Total		19	3	0	0	0	0	0	0	19	3
Pogoń Siedlce (loan)	2015–16	I liga	15	0	—		—		—		15	0
Wigry Suwałki (loan)	2016–17	I liga	28	1	5	0	—		—		33	1
Miedź Legnica	2017–18	I liga	29	3	2	0	—		—		31	3
Miedź Legnica	2018–19	Ekstraklasa	22	2	2	0	—		—		24	2
Miedź Legnica	Total		51	5	4	0	0	0	0	0	55	5
Miedź Legnica II	2017–18	III liga, gr. III	1	0	—		—		—		1	0
Miedź Legnica II	2018–19	III liga, gr. III	1	0	—		—		—		1	0
Miedź Legnica II	Total		2	0	0	0	0	0	0	0	2	0
Ural Yekaterinburg	2019–20	RPL	29	1	3	1	—		1 (Note: Appearance in FNL Cup)	0	33	2
Ural Yekaterinburg	2020–21	RPL	25	4	3	0	—		—		28	4
Ural Yekaterinburg	2021–22	RPL	26	3	1	0	—		—		27	3
Ural Yekaterinburg	Total		80	8	7	1	0	0	1	0	88	9
Legia Warsaw	2022–23	Ekstraklasa	25	4	5	0	—		—		30	4
Legia Warsaw	2023–24	Ekstraklasa	22	1	2	0	10 (Note: Appearances in UEFA Conference League)	2	1 (Note: Appearance in Polish Super Cup)	0	35	3
Legia Warsaw	2024–25	Ekstraklasa	25	4	4	0	13	0	—		42	4
Legia Warsaw	2025–26	Ekstraklasa	24	2	0	0	13 (Note: Six appearances in UEFA Europa League, seven appearances and two goals in UEFA Conference League)	2	1	0	38	4
Legia Warsaw	Total		96	11	11	0	36	4	2	0	145	15
Legia Warsaw II	2023–24	III liga, gr. I	1	0	0	0	—		—		1	0
Career total			374	32	32	1	36	4	3	0	445	37

=== International ===
Appearances and goals by national team and year
National team	Year	Apps	Goals
Poland
Poland	2021	1	0
Total		1	0

== Honours ==
Miedź Legnica

- I liga: 2017–18

Legia Warsaw

- Polish Cup: 2022–23, 2024–25
- Polish Super Cup: 2023, 2025
