= 2023 Polish Super Cup =

Football competition

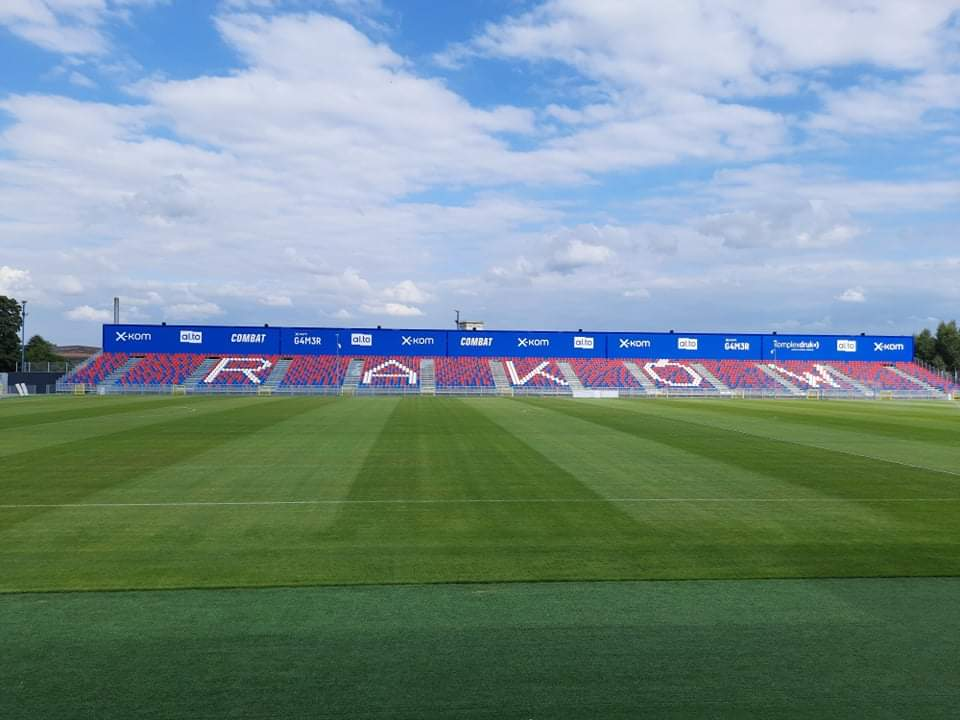
- The Miejski Stadion Piłkarski "Raków" in Częstochowa hosted the final.
Raków Częstochowa	Legia Warsaw
0	0
- Legia Warsaw won 6–5 on penalties
- Date: 15 July 2023
- Venue: Miejski Stadion Piłkarski "Raków", Częstochowa
- Referee: Szymon Marciniak (Płock)
- Attendance: 5,500

The 2023 Polish Super Cup was the 32nd Polish Super Cup, an annual Polish football match played between the reigning winners of the Ekstraklasa and Polish Cup. The Ekstraklasa champions Raków Częstochowa faced Polish Cup winners Legia Warsaw.

Raków were the defending champions. The match finished with a 0–0 draw after regular time. There was no extra-time played. Legia won 6–5 on penalties.

== Match ==
15 July 2023
20:10 CEST (UTC+02:00)

Raków Częstochowa	0–0	Legia Warsaw
	Report
Penalties
Tudor (penalty scored); Zwoliński (penalty scored); Cebula (penalty missed); Rundić (penalty scored); Papanikolaou (penalty scored); Lederman (penalty scored); Jean Carlos (penalty missed)	5–6	(penalty scored) Slisz; (penalty scored) Augustyniak; (penalty scored) Kramer; (penalty missed) Rosołek; (penalty scored) Josué; (penalty scored) Gual; (penalty scored) Nawrocki

Miejski Stadion Piłkarski "Raków", Częstochowa
Attendance: 5,500
Referee: Szymon Marciniak (Płock)

Raków Częstochowa	Legia Warsaw

GK	1	(Bosnia and Herzegovina) Vladan Kovačević
CB	25	(Romania) Bogdan Racovițan
CB	24	(Croatia) Zoran Arsenić (c)
CB	3	(Serbia) Milan Rundić
RM	7	(Croatia) Fran Tudor
CM	66	(Greece) Giannis Papanikolaou	(yellow card) 90+6'
CM	5	(Sweden) Gustav Berggren		(substituted off) 81'
LM	22	(Romania) Deian Sorescu		(substituted off) 77'
RF	11	(Germany) John Yeboah		(substituted off) 61'
CF	99	(Poland) Fabian Piasecki		(substituted off) 61'
LF	11	(Ukraine) Vladyslav Kocherhin		(substituted off) 61'
Substitutes:
GK	89	(Poland) Kacper Bieszczad
DF	4	(Greece) Stratos Svarnas
MF	8	(Poland) Ben Lederman		(substituted on) 81'
MF	17	(Poland) Mateusz Wdowiak
MF	20	(Brazil) Jean Carlos		(substituted on) 77'
MF	23	(Switzerland) Maxime Dominguez		(substituted on) 61'
MF	27	(Poland) Bartosz Nowak
MF	77	(Poland) Marcin Cebula		(substituted on) 61'
FW	9	(Poland) Łukasz Zwoliński	(yellow card) 84'	(substituted on) 61'
Manager:
(Poland) Dawid Szwarga

GK	1	(Poland) Kacper Tobiasz
CB	55	(Poland) Artur Jędrzejczyk		(substituted off) 64'
CB	8	(Poland) Rafał Augustyniak	(yellow card) 90+8'
CB	5	(Portugal) Yuri Ribeiro
RM	13	(Poland) Paweł Wszołek
CM	99	(Poland) Bartosz Slisz	(yellow card) 69'
CM	22	(Colombia) Juergen Elitim		(substituted off) 64'
LM	33	(Poland) Patryk Kun		(substituted off) 90'
AM	27	(Portugal) Josué (c)
CF	7	(Czech Republic) Tomáš Pekhart		(substituted off) 64'
CF	20	(Albania) Ernest Muçi		(substituted off) 64'
Substitutes:
GK	30	(Poland) Dominik Hładun
DF	12	(Serbia) Radovan Pankov
DF	17	(Poland) Maik Nawrocki		(substituted on) 64'
MF	18	(Poland) Patryk Sokołowski
MF	26	(Poland) Filip Rejczyk
MF	32	(Germany) Makana Baku	(yellow card) 90+3'	(substituted on) 90'
MF	9	(Slovenia) Blaž Kramer		(substituted on) 64'
FW	28	(Spain) Marc Gual	(yellow card) 73'	(substituted on) 64'
FW	39	(Poland) Maciej Rosołek		(substituted on) 84'
Manager:
(Germany) Kosta Runjaić

Match rules

- 90 minutes.
- Penalty shoot-out if scores still level.
- Nine named substitutes.
- Maximum of five substitutions.

== See also ==
- 2023–24 Ekstraklasa
- 2023–24 Polish Cup
