= Carlitos (footballer, born 1990) =

Spanish footballer

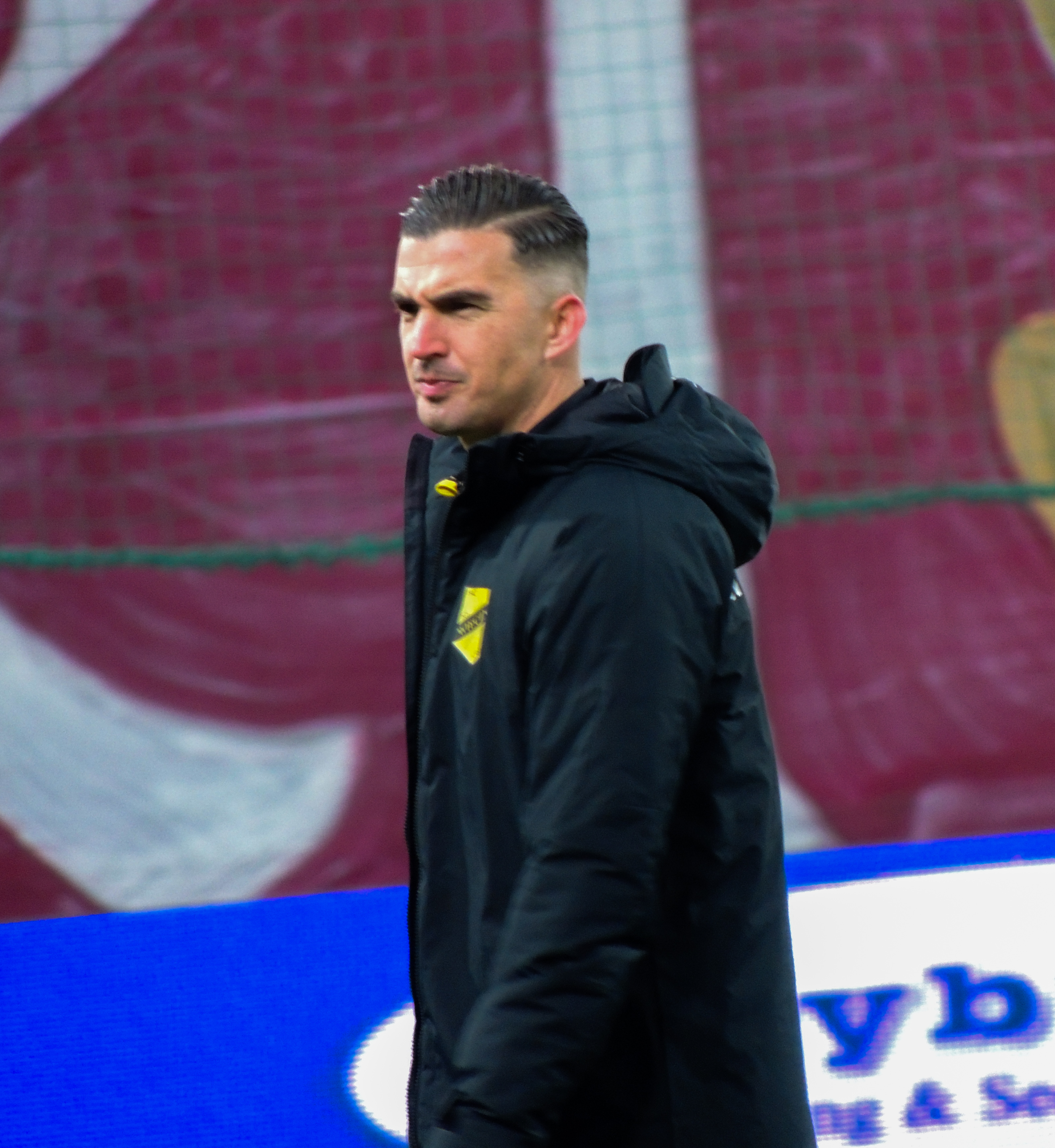
- Carlitos with Wieczysta Kraków in 2026

Personal information
- Full name: Carlos Daniel López Huesca
- Date of birth: 12 June 1990 (age 36)
- Place of birth: Alicante, Spain
- Height: 1.76 m (5 ft 9 in)
- Position: Forward

Team information
- Current team: Intercity

Youth career
- 1998–2000: Alicante
- 2000–2004: Hércules
- 2004–2006: Torrellano
- 2006–2008: Murcia
- 2008–2009: Elche

Senior career*
Years	Team	Apps	(Gls)
2009–2011	Torrellano Illice	32	(2)
2011–2012	Ontinyent	28	(6)
2012–2013	Petrotrest	20	(2)
2013–2014	Fuenlabrada	23	(2)
2014–2015	Novelda	20	(13)
2015	Aris Limassol	9	(2)
2015–2016	Eldense	33	(13)
2016–2017	Villarreal B	37	(13)
2017–2018	Wisła Kraków	36	(24)
2018–2019	Legia Warsaw	38	(16)
2019–2020	Al Wahda	9	(5)
2020–2022	Panathinaikos	62	(16)
2022–2023	Legia Warsaw	21	(1)
2023–2024	Lamia	22	(10)
2024	Astana	3	(0)
2024–2025	Atromitos	20	(5)
2025–2026	Wieczysta Kraków	25	(5)
2026–	Intercity	9	(5)
- * Club domestic league appearances and goals as of 00:58, 12 November 2026 (UTC)

Carlos Daniel López Huesca (born 12 June 1990), commonly known as Carlitos, is a Spanish professional footballer who plays as a forward for Segunda Federación club Intercity.

Having played no higher than Segunda División B in his own country, he spent most of his career abroad, with spells in Russia, Cyprus, Poland, the United Arab Emirates, Greece and Kazakhstan. He was the top scorer of the 2017–18 Ekstraklasa with 24 goals for Wisła Kraków.

== Career ==
=== Early years ===
Carlitos was born in Alicante, Valencian Community. He played youth football for a number of clubs, and made his debut as a senior in the Tercera División with Torrellano Illice.

Carlitos spent the 2011–12 season with neighbouring Ontinyent, in the Segunda División B. In the summer of 2012 he moved abroad, going on to make his first appearances as a professional with Petrotrest Saint Petersburg in the National League of Russia.

In January 2015, as he was top scorer with fourth-tier side Novelda, Carlitos joined Aris Limassol in the Cypriot Second Division. In the summer, after helping to promotion, he returned to his country and signed for Eldense.

=== Wisła Kraków ===
On 22 June 2017, Carlitos left Villarreal B and moved to Polish club Wisła Kraków. In his first season in the Ekstraklasa, he won the Player of the Season as well as the Striker of the Season awards after finishing top scorer with 24 goals in 36 matches. This tally included a brace in a 2–1 home win in the local derby against KS Cracovia on 12 August, a hat-trick on 9 March 2018 against Śląsk Wrocław and a penalty nine days later in a 2–0 victory at Legia Warsaw; this was his team's first in the city in eight years.

=== Legia Warsaw ===
In the summer of 2018, Carlitos was linked with a move away from cash-strapped Wisła to Lech Poznań, before joining Legia on 5 July. He made his debut nine days later in the Super Cup, coming on as a 57th-minute substitute for Miroslav Radović in a 3–2 home defeat to Arka Gdynia. On 17 July he played the first European game of his career, coming off the bench to conclude a 3–0 win (4–0 aggregate) over Cork City in the first qualifying round of the UEFA Champions League.

Carlitos was the league season's joint third top scorer with 16 for the runners-up. This included two on 21 October in a 3–3 draw when his former team visited the Stadion Wojska Polskiego.

=== Al Wahda ===
On 9 September 2019, Carlitos joined the UAE Pro League's Al Wahda for €1.8 million. On 1 November, he sored twice in the 3–1 home win over Al Dhafra.

=== Panathinaikos ===
On 28 January 2020, Carlitos signed a three-and-a-half-year contract with Panathinaikos for an undisclosed fee. His first Super League Greece goal came in a 2–2 away draw against OFI Crete on 18 October. The following weekend, he missed a penalty seconds before scoring through a header in the 1–1 home draw with Volos.

Carlitos scored a hat-trick on 16 October 2021 in a 4–1 home win over Ionikos, becoming the first player since Marcus Berg in 2017 to achieve this feat for the club.

=== Return to Legia ===
On 16 August 2022, after again being linked with their archrivals Lech Poznań, Carlitos returned to Legia Warsaw on a two-year deal. In July 2023, he left by mutual consent.

=== Astana ===
In March 2024, Kazakhstan Premier League club Astana announced the signing of Carlitos from Lamia. On 6 May, having grown unsettled in the country, he requested to terminate his contract.

=== Atromitos ===
On 12 June 2024, Carlitos joined Atromitos of the Greek top division on a two-year deal. The following 12 January, he scored a brace in a 3–0 away defeat of his former employers Lamia.

=== Wieczysta Kraków ===
In February 2025, Polish media reported Carlitos would be returning to Kraków to join II liga side Wieczysta Kraków for the 2025–26 season. His transfer was confirmed on 15 June, hours after the team earned promotion to the I liga; he signed a one-year deal with an option for another year.

=== Later career ===
Carlitos returned to Spain on 3 July 2026, on a contract at Intercity in the Segunda Federación.

== Personal life ==
Carlitos' younger brother, Rubén, was also a footballer. He too played in Kraków, but for Wisła's rivals Cracovia.

== Career statistics ==
As of match played 24 May 2026

Appearances and goals by club, season and competition
Club	Season	League			National cup (Note: Includes Russian Cup, Polish Cup, UAE President's Cup, Greek Cup)		Continental		Other		Total	
Club	Season	Division	Apps	Goals	Apps	Goals	Apps	Goals	Apps	Goals	Apps	Goals
Ontinyent	2011–12	Segunda División B	28	6	0	0	—		—		28	6
Petrotrest	2012–13	National Football League	20	2	1	0	—		—		21	2
Fuenlabrada	2013–14	Segunda División B	23	2	0	0	—		—		23	2
Eldense	2015–16	Segunda División B	33	13	0	0	—		—		33	13
Villarreal B	2015–16	Segunda División B	4	0	—		—		—		4	0
Villarreal B	2016–17	Segunda División B	33	13	—		—		—		33	13
Villarreal B	Total		37	13	—		—		—		37	13
Wisła Kraków	2017–18	Ekstraklasa	36	24	0	0	—		—		36	24
Legia Warsaw	2018–19	Ekstraklasa	36	16	3	1	5 (Note: Three appearances and one goal in UEFA Champions League, two appearances and one goal in UEFA Europa League)	2	1 (Note: Appearance in Polish Super Cup)	0	45	19
Legia Warsaw	2019–20	Ekstraklasa	2	0	0	0	6 (Note: Appearances in UEFA Europa League)	2	0	0	8	2
Legia Warsaw	Total		38	16	3	1	11	4	1	0	53	21
Al Wahda	2019–20	UAE Pro League	9	5	4	2	—		—		13	7
Panathinaikos	2020–21	Super League Greece	32	6	2	0	—		—		34	6
Panathinaikos	2021–22	Super League Greece	30	10	5	2	—		—		35	12
Panathinaikos	2022–23	Super League Greece	0	0	0	0	1 (Note: Appearance in UEFA Europa Conference League)	0	—		1	0
Panathinaikos	Total		62	16	7	2	1	0	0	0	70	18
Legia Warsaw	2022–23	Ekstraklasa	21	1	4	3	—		—		25	4
Lamia	2023–24	Super League Greece	22	10	0	0	—		—		22	10
Astana	2024	Kazakhstan Premier League	3	0	0	0	—		—		3	0
Atromitos	2024–25	Super League Greece	20	5	2	0	—		—		22	5
Wieczysta Kraków	2025–26	I liga	25	5	1	0	—		—		26	5
Career total			377	118	22	8	12	4	1	0	412	130

== Honours ==
Legia Warsaw

- Ekstraklasa: 2019–20
- Polish Cup: 2022–23

Panathinaikos

- Greek Cup: 2021–22

Individual

- Ekstraklasa top scorer: 2017–18 (24 goals)
- Ekstraklasa Player of the Season: 2017–18
- Ekstraklasa Forward of the Season: 2017–18
- Ekstraklasa Player of the Month: October 2017
