= Cezary Miszta =

Polish footballer

Personal information
- Full name: Cezary Miszta
- Date of birth: 30 October 2001 (age 25)
- Place of birth: Łuków, Poland
- Height: 1.93 m (6 ft 4 in)
- Position: Goalkeeper

Team information
- Current team: Rio Ave
- Number: 1

Youth career
- ŁSR Łuków
- 2013–2016: Orlęta Łuków
- 2016: Motor Lublin
- 2016–2017: Legia Warsaw

Senior career*
Years	Team	Apps	(Gls)
2017–2024	Legia Warsaw II	36	(0)
2019–2024	Legia Warsaw	21	(0)
2019	→ Zagłębie Sosnowiec (loan)	0	(0)
2020	→ Radomiak Radom (loan)	13	(0)
2024	→ Rio Ave (loan)	1	(0)
2024–	Rio Ave	47	(0)

International career
2019	Poland U19	6	(0)
2021	Poland U20	1	(0)
2021–2022	Poland U21	8	(0)
- * Club domestic league appearances and goals as of 25 May 2026

Cezary Miszta (born 30 October 2001) is a Polish professional footballer who plays as a goalkeeper for Primeira Liga club Rio Ave.

== Career ==
On 29 January 2024, Legia Warsaw sent Miszta on loan to Portuguese Primeira Liga club Rio Ave until the end of the 2023–24 season. His first appearance for the club came on the final matchday, in a 1–1 home draw against Benfica on 17 May 2024.

In June 2024, Rio Ave opted to sign Miszta on a permanent basis to a three-year contract.

== Career statistics ==
As of match played 11 May 2026

Appearances and goals by club, season and competition
Club	Season	League			National cup (Note: Includes Polish Cup, Taça de Portugal)		Continental		Other		Total	
Club	Season	Division	Apps	Goals	Apps	Goals	Apps	Goals	Apps	Goals	Apps	Goals
Legia Warsaw	2020–21	Ekstraklasa	6	0	3	0	0	0	0	0	9	0
Legia Warsaw	2021–22	Ekstraklasa	15	0	3	0	4 (Note: Appearances in UEFA Europa League)	0	1 (Note: Appearance in Polish Super Cup)	0	23	0
Legia Warsaw	2022–23	Ekstraklasa	0	0	4	0	—		—		4	0
Legia Warsaw	Total		21	0	10	0	4	0	1	0	36	0
Zagłębie Sosnowiec (loan)	2019–20	I liga	0	0	—		—		—		0	0
Radomiak Radom (loan)	2019–20	I liga	11	0	—		—		2 (Note: Appearances in I liga promotion play-offs)	0	13	0
Rio Ave (loan)	2023–24	Primeira Liga	1	0	—		—		—		1	0
Rio Ave	2024–25	Primeira Liga	26	0	5	0	—		—		31	0
Rio Ave	2025–26	Primeira Liga	21	0	0	0	—		—		21	0
Rio Ave	Total		48	0	5	0	—		—		53	0
Career total			80	0	14	0	4	0	2	0	100	0

== Honours ==
Legia Warsaw

- Ekstraklasa: 2020–21
- Polish Cup: 2022–23

Legia Warsaw II

- Polish Cup (Masovia regionals): 2018–19

Individual

- Primeira Liga Goalkeeper of the Month: January 2025
