= Ramil Mustafaev =

Russian footballer (born 2003)

Personal information
- Date of birth: 20 December 2003 (age 22)
- Place of birth: Makhachkala, Russia
- Height: 1.83 m (6 ft 0 in)
- Positions: Right-back; winger

Team information
- Current team: Chojniczanka Chojnice
- Number: 6

Youth career
- –2014: GKP Targówek
- 2014–2019: Talent Warsaw
- 2019–2020: Stal Rzeszów

Senior career*
Years	Team	Apps	(Gls)
2020–2022	Stal Rzeszów	28	(5)
2022–2025	Legia Warsaw II	10	(1)
2023–2025	Legia Warsaw	0	(0)
2022–2023	→ Stal Rzeszów (loan)	24	(0)
2025–2026	Cracovia II	32	(9)
2026–	Chojniczanka Chojnice	5	(0)
- * Club domestic league appearances and goals as of 15:49, 15 September 2026 (UTC)

Ramil Mustafaev (Russian: Рамиль Мустафаев; born 20 December 2003) is a Russian professional footballer who plays as a right-back or winger for II liga club Chojniczanka Chojnice.

== Early life ==
Born in Makhachkala, Russia, Mustafaev moved to Poland at the age of six.

== Career ==
Mustafaev started his career with Polish side Stal Rzeszów. In July 2023, shortly after being promoted to Legia Warsaw's senior team and being registered to play in Ekstraklasa, Mustafaev suffered an ACL tear.

On 21 February 2025, he moved to the reserve side of fellow Ekstraklasa club Cracovia on a half-year deal.

On 10 July 2026, Mustafaev signed for II liga side Chojniczanka Chojnice on a year-long contract, with a one-year extension option.

== Style of play ==
Mustafaev mainly operates on the right wing and is known for his versatility.

== Personal life ==
He is the brother of Russian mixed martial arts fighter Azamat Mustafaev. As of 2023, he was in the process of obtaining a Polish passport.

== Honours ==
Legia Warsaw II

- Polish Cup (Masovia regionals): 2021–22

Cracovia II

- IV liga Lesser Poland: 2024–25
