= Jakub Kisiel =

Polish footballer

Personal information
- Date of birth: 5 February 2003 (age 23)
- Place of birth: Wyszków, Poland
- Height: 1.84 m (6 ft 0 in)
- Position: Midfielder

Team information
- Current team: Mławianka Mława

Youth career
- –2016: Nadnarwianka Pułtusk
- 2016–2020: Polonia Warsaw
- 2020: Legia Warsaw

Senior career*
Years	Team	Apps	(Gls)
2020–2025	Legia Warsaw II	55	(3)
2020–2024	Legia Warsaw	5	(0)
2022	→ Stomil Olsztyn (loan)	10	(0)
2023–2024	→ Podbeskidzie (loan)	25	(1)
2025–2026	Elana Toruń	28	(0)
2026–	Mławianka Mława	0	(0)

International career
2019	Poland U16	5	(0)
2019–2020	Poland U17	8	(0)
2021	Poland U19	4	(0)
- * Club domestic league appearances and goals as of 17:13, 4 June 2026 (UTC)

Jakub Kisiel (born 5 February 2003) is a Polish professional footballer who plays as a midfielder for III liga club Mławianka Mława.

== Club career ==
Kisiel came through the ranks of Polonia Warsaw, before joining their local Legia rivals in February 2020. He then fell victim to abuse from Legia fans, including a hostile banner at the stadium even before he played his first game, as he was viewed as a "traitor" by some hooligans.

He still went on to become a professional player with Legia, making his team debut on 6 February 2021 in a 2–0 Ekstraklasa home win against Raków Częstochowa. On 4 February 2022, Kisiel joined I liga side Stomil Olsztyn on loan from Legia.

On 12 July 2023, he went on another loan, this time joining Podbeskidzie Bielsko-Biała until the end of the season.

On 10 July 2025, Kisiel joined fourth tier club Elana Toruń on a season-long contract, with an option for another year. On 3 June 2026, he left the club by mutual consent.

On 17 June 2026, Kisiel signed with Mławianka Mława.

== Honours ==
Legia Warsaw

- Ekstraklasa: 2020–21

Legia Warsaw II

- Polish Cup (Masovia regionals): 2022–23, 2024–25
