= Igor Strzałek =

Polish footballer (born 2004

Personal information
- Date of birth: 19 January 2004 (age 22)
- Place of birth: Siedlce, Poland
- Height: 1.83 m (6 ft 0 in)
- Position: Attacking midfielder

Team information
- Current team: ŁKS Łódź
- Number: 10

Youth career
- 2013–2015: Naprzód Siedlce
- 2015–2017: Pogoń Siedlce
- 2017–2020: Legia Warsaw

Senior career*
Years	Team	Apps	(Gls)
2021–2023	Legia Warsaw II	27	(7)
2022–2026	Legia Warsaw	23	(1)
2024	→ Stal Mielec (loan)	10	(0)
2024–2026	→ Bruk-Bet Termalica (loan)	57	(3)
2026–	ŁKS Łódź	0	(0)

International career
2023	Poland U19	7	(2)
- * Club domestic league appearances and goals as of 21:29, 25 May 2026 (UTC)

Igor Strzałek (born 19 January 2004) is a Polish professional footballer who plays as an attacking midfielder for I liga club ŁKS Łódź.

== Club career ==
Strzałek began his youth career at the clubs Naprzód Skórzec and Pogoń Siedlce, where he caught the attention of scouts from Legia Warsaw. In 2017, he joined Legia's youth teams, and in 2022, he made his debut with the first team. He spent the spring round of the 2023–24 season on loan at Ekstraklasa club Stal Mielec.

At the beginning of the 2024–25 season, he was loaned out to Bruk-Bet Termalica Nieciecza, a club playing one tier lower. In June 2025, the loan was extended for another season.

After leaving Legia at the end of his contract, Strzałek joined I liga club ŁKS Łódź on 6 August 2026 on a one-year deal.

== Honours ==
Legia Warsaw

- Polish Cup: 2022–23

Legia Warsaw II

- Polish Cup (Masovia regionals): 2021–22
