= Kosta Runjaić =

German footballer and manager

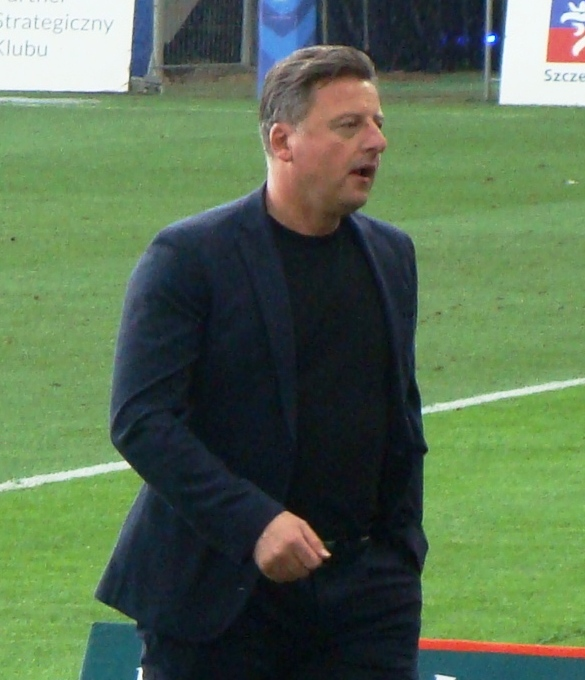
- Runjaić in 2021 managing Pogoń Szczecin

Personal information
- Date of birth: 4 June 1971 (age 55)
- Place of birth: Vienna, Austria

Youth career
- Türk Gücü Rüsselsheim

Senior career*
Years	Team	Apps	(Gls)
1989-1997	Türk Gücü Rüsselsheim		
1997-2002	SV 07 Raunheim		
2002	FSV Frankfurt		

Managerial career
- 2006: 1. FC Kaiserslautern II (caretaker)
- 2007–2008: Wehen Wiesbaden II
- 2008: VfR Aalen (caretaker)
- 2010–2012: SV Darmstadt
- 2012–2013: MSV Duisburg
- 2013–2015: 1.FC Kaiserslautern
- 2016: 1860 Munich
- 2017–2022: Pogoń Szczecin
- 2022–2024: Legia Warsaw
- 2024–2026: Udinese
- * Club domestic league appearances and goals

Kosta Runjaić (Serbo-Croatian pronunciation: [kôsta ruɲǎːitɕ]; born 4 June 1971) is an German professional football manager and former player.

== Life and club career ==
Runjaic, whose parents are from Yugoslavia, was born in Vienna, Austria in 1971 and grew up in Rüsselsheim, Germany. He is married and has three children.

Runjaić played during his club career for Türk Gücü Rüsselsheim, SV 07 Raunheim and FSV Frankfurt in Germany.

== Managerial career ==
=== In Germany ===
After two years as a regional coach for the DFB, he became manager of 1. FC Kaiserslautern II in 2004. In 2006, he moved to SV Wehen Wiesbaden, initially as a youth coach, before being handed responsibility for the reserve team after a year. With this team, he secured promotion from the Oberliga Hessen to the Regionalliga Süd in 2008.

In 2008, he became assistant manager at third-tier side VfR Aalen under Jürgen Kohler and, following Kohler’s resignation, served as interim manager for one match. He remained assistant manager under Kohler’s successor, Petrik Sander.

In March 2010, he succeeded Živojin Juškić at SV Darmstadt 98, a Regionalliga side then facing the threat of relegation, and achieved the club’s goal of avoiding the drop. Following the team’s success the following season, his contract was extended in March 2011 until June 2012. A nine-match winning streak laid the foundations for promotion to the 3. Liga.

On 3 September 2012, Runjaic moved to second-division side MSV Duisburg as the successor to the sacked head coach Oliver Reck. He signed a contract running until 30 June 2014. Kosta Runjaic, who had taken charge of MSV Duisburg whilst they were bottom of the table, managed to stabilise the team and save the club from relegation. Following Duisburg’s forced relegation to the 3. Liga at the end of the 2012–13 season due to financial problems, Runjaic left the club of his own accord.

Runjaić as manager of 1. FC Kaiserslautern in 2013

From 16 September 2013, he was head coach of 1. FC Kaiserslautern. He took over from Franco Foda, who had been sacked, and Oliver Schäfer, who had stepped in as interim coach for two matches. Following a poor start to the 2015–16 season, with just two wins from eight matches, he resigned on 23 September 2015.

Runjaic took charge of TSV 1860 Munich from the 2016–17 season onwards. On 22 November 2016, he was suspended from his duties.

=== In Poland ===
Runjaić moved to Poland to coach Ekstraklasa side Pogoń Szczecin from 2017 to 2022. In mid-2022, Runjaić was appointed the new manager of Legia Warsaw. He won the 2022–23 Polish Cup and 2023 Polish Super Cup with Legia, and led the team to the knockout round play-offs of the 2023–24 UEFA Europa Conference League, before being sacked on 9 April 2024.

=== Udinese ===
On 14 June 2024, Runjaić was announced as the new head coach of Italian Serie A club Udinese.

On 2 November 2026, Runjaić was dismissed by Udinese after the club started the 2026–27 Serie A season with just five points in ten matches.

== Managerial statistics ==
As of match played 31 October 2026

Managerial record by team and tenure
Team	Nat.	From	To	Record							
Team	Nat.	From	To	G	W	D	L	GF	GA	GD	Win %
1. FC Kaiserslautern II (caretaker)	(Germany)	15 August 2006	23 August 2006	1	0	0	1	1	2	−1	0.00
Wehen Wiesbaden II	(Germany)	1 July 2007	30 June 2008	34	19	7	8	71	37	+34	55.88
VfR Aalen (caretaker)	(Germany)	20 November 2008	24 November 2008	1	0	0	1	0	4	−4	0.00
SV Darmstadt	(Germany)	23 March 2010	3 September 2012	91	36	29	26	122	98	+24	39.56
MSV Duisburg	(Germany)	3 September 2012	30 June 2013	31	11	10	10	35	38	−3	35.48
1.FC Kaiserslautern	(Germany)	16 September 2013	23 September 2015	77	32	27	18	109	79	+30	41.56
1860 Munich	(Germany)	7 June 2016	22 November 2016	15	4	4	7	19	22	−3	26.67
Pogoń Szczecin	(Poland)	6 November 2017	23 May 2022	169	74	47	48	244	191	+53	43.79
Legia Warsaw	(Poland)	23 May 2022	9 April 2024	85	47	20	18	167	118	+49	55.29
Udinese	(Italy)	1 July 2024	2 November 2026	94	33	18	43	110	132	−22	35.11
Total				598	256	162	180	878	720	+158	42.81

== Honours ==
=== Manager ===
SV Darmstadt

- Regionalliga Süd: 2010–11

Legia Warsaw

- Polish Cup: 2022–23
- Polish Super Cup: 2023

Individual

- Ekstraklasa Coach of the Month: October 2018, November 2018, July 2019, December 2020, August 2022
- Piłka Nożna Foreigner of the Year: 2021
- Serie A Coach of the Month: May 2026
