= Dominik Hładun =

Polish footballer (born 1995)

Personal information
- Date of birth: 17 September 1995 (age 31)
- Place of birth: Lubin, Poland
- Height: 1.90 m (6 ft 3 in)
- Position: Goalkeeper

Team information
- Current team: Zagłębie Lubin
- Number: 30

Youth career
- –2014: Zagłębie Lubin

Senior career*
Years	Team	Apps	(Gls)
2014–2022	Zagłębie Lubin	109	(0)
2015	→ Chojniczanka Chojnice (loan)	10	(0)
2022–2024	Legia Warsaw	18	(0)
2022–2023	Legia Warsaw II	5	(0)
2024–	Zagłębie Lubin	41	(0)
- * Club domestic league appearances and goals as of 17:38, 29 May 2026 (UTC)

Dominik Hładun (born 17 September 1995) is a Polish professional footballer who plays as a goalkeeper for Ekstraklasa club Zagłębie Lubin.

== Honours ==
Zagłębie Lubin II

- IV liga Lower Silesia West: 2016–17
- Polish Cup (Lower Silesia regionals): 2016–17
- Polish Cup (Legnica regionals): 2016–17

Legia Warsaw

- Polish Cup: 2022–23
