= 2025–26 Legia Warsaw season =

Legia Warsaw
2025–26 season
- Chairman: Dariusz Mioduski
- Manager: Edward Iordănescu
- Stadium: Polish Army Stadium
- Ekstraklasa: 17th
- Polish Cup: Round of 32
- Polish Super Cup: Winners
- UEFA Europa League: Third qualifying round
- UEFA Conference League: League stage
- Top goalscorer: League: Mileta Rajović (3); All: Mileta Rajović (7)
- Average home league attendance: 23,490
Home colours	Away colours	Third colours

The 2025–26 season is Legia Warsaw's 108th season in existence and the club's 77th consecutive season in the top flight of Polish football. In addition to the domestic league, they will also participate in this season's editions of the Polish Cup, Polish, and UEFA Europa League. The season covers the period from 1 July 2025 to 30 June 2026.

== Review ==
=== Background ===
The 2024–25 season was a disappointing one for many Legia Warsaw fans. Despite winning the Polish Cup and reaching the quarterfinals of the Conference League, finishing only 5th in the league was seen as a major failure, as Legia had failed to win the Polish championship for the fourth consecutive season. Poor performance on the pitch led to significant changes at the club. Midway through the previous season, Jacek Zieliński ceased to serve as sporting director; after a few weeks, Michał Żewłakow, who had already held this position from 2015 to 2017, was appointed in his place. The club also hired Fredi Bobić as Head of Football Operations.

Despite the disappointing results, the new sporting director had planned to extend the contract of head coach Gonçalo Feio. However, disagreements over the scope of his responsibilities, as well as the situation in the last match against Stal Mielec—in which the coach did not field the talented Mateusz Szczepaniak, thereby preventing his contract from being automatically extended—led to the breakdown of talks, and Feio left the club. The club also parted ways with scouting director Radosław Mozyrko, whose position was taken over by Piotr Zasada, previously deputy director of the Legia Warsaw Football Academy for scouting, recruitment, and individual development. The scouting department was also left by Tomasz Kiełbowicz, Piotr Włodarczyk, and Mateusz Mazur.

Finally, on June 12, Legia's new coach was presented — the former head coach of the Romanian national team, Edward Iordănescu. On June 16, the team departed for a training camp in Austria, where they played two friendly matches: one ended in a draw against Ludogorets Razgrad, and the other was a win against FK Jablonec.

=== Super Cup victory ===
Prior to the league and European commitments, Legia secured the 2025 Polish Super Cup on 13 July 2025, defeating Lech Poznań 2–1 at the Enea Stadium in Poznań, thus claiming their sixth Super Cup title.

=== European campaign ===
Following their Polish Super Cup triumph, Legia Warsaw progressed through the early stages of the 2025–26 UEFA Europa League qualifiers with gathered momentum. The club navigated the first qualifying round, achieving a 1–0 victory at home and securing a decisive stoppage-time 1–0 win away against Kazakhstan's FC Aktobe, thus advancing 2–0 on aggregate. In the second qualifying round, Legia overcame Czech side Baník Ostrava with a 2–1 home win following a 2–2 draw away, progressing 4–3 on aggregate.

However, in a stunning turn of events during the third qualifying round, Legia suffered a heavy 4–1 defeat in the first leg away to AEK Larnaca, leaving them with a significant deficit to overcome. Despite mounting a spirited 2–1 home win in the return leg, Legia were eliminated 5–3 on aggregate.

== Board and management team ==
Position	Name
President of the Management Board and Owner	(Poland) Dariusz Mioduski
Vice Presidents of the Management Board	(Poland) Marcin Herra, (Poland) Jarosław Jurczak
Sporting Advisor to the Board	(Poland) Jacek Zieliński
Supervisory Board	(Poland) Anna Mioduska (President), (Poland) Jarosław Jankowski, (Poland) Jerzy Kowalski, (Poland) Marian Owerko, (Poland) Robert Jędrzejczyk
Sporting Director	(Poland) Michał Żewłakow
Head of Football Operations	(Germany) Fredi Bobic

- Last updated: June 2025

== First team ==
=== Coaching staff ===
Position	Name
Head coach	(Romania) Edward Iordănescu
Assistant coaches	(Romania) Alexandru Radu, (Spain) Inaki Astiz, (Poland) Grzegorz Mokry, (Poland) Daniel Wojtasz
Goalkeeping coaches	(Poland) Arkadiusz Malarz, (Poland) Krzysztof Dowhań
Fitness coaches	(Poland) Bartosz Bibrowicz, (Romania) Bogdan Merișanu, (Spain) Sebastián López Bascón, (Poland) Dawid Goliński,
Analysts	(Italy) Michele Iannucci, (Poland) Maciej Krzymień

- Last updated: June 2025

=== First-team squad ===
No.	Player	Nat.	Positions	Date of birth (age)	Signed in	Contract ends	Previous club	Transfer fee
Goalkeepers
1	Kacper Tobiasz	(Poland)	GK	4 November 2002 (age 22)	2020	2026	(Poland) Legia Warsaw II	Free
23	Gabriel Kobylak	(Poland)	GK	20 February 2002 (age 23)	2020	2027	(Poland) Legia Warsaw II	Free
31	Marcel Mendes-Dudziński	(Poland)	GK	14 May 2004 (age 21)	2024	2028	(Portugal) S.L. Benfica	Free
Defenders
3	Steve Kapuadi	(Poland)	CB	30 April 1998 (age 27)	2023	2026	(Poland) Wisła Płock	Free
4	Marco Burch	(France)	CB	19 October 2000 (age 24)	2023	2029	(Switzerland) FC Luzern	€0.55-0.8M
12	Radovan Pankov	(Serbia)	CB	5 August 1995 (age 29)	2023	2026	(Serbia) Red Star Belgrade	Free
13	Arkadiusz Reca	(Poland)	LB	17 June 1995 (age 30)	2025	2028	(Italy) Spezia Calcio	Free
19	Rúben Vinagre	(Portugal)	LB / LW	9 April 1999 (age 26)	2024	2028	(Portugal) Sporting CP	€2.3-2.5M
24	Jan Ziółkowski (U23)	(Poland)	CB	5 June 2005 (age 20)	2023	2025	(Poland) Legia Warsaw II	Free
30	Petar Stojanović	(Slovenia)	RB	7 October 1995 (age 29)	2025	2028	(Italy) US Salernitana 1919	Free
33	Patryk Kun	(Poland)	LB / LW	20 April 1995 (age 30)	2023	2026	(Poland) Raków Częstochowa	Free
55	Artur Jędrzejczyk	(Poland)	CB	4 November 1987 (age 37)	2017	2026	(Russia) FC Krasnodar	€0.9M
91	Kamil Piątkowski	(Poland)	CB	21 June 2000 (age 25)	2025	2029	(Austria) FC Red Bull Salzburg	Free
Midfielders
5	Claude Gonçalves	(Portugal)	DM	9 April 1994 (age 31)	2024	2027	(Bulgaria) PFC Ludogorets Razgrad	Free
6	Henrique Arreiol	(Portugal)	CM	26 February 2005 (age 20)	2025	2029	(Portugal) Sporting CP	Free
7	Paweł Wszołek	(Poland)	RW	30 April 1992 (age 33)	2022	2025	(Germany) 1. FC Union Berlin	Free
8	Rafał Augustyniak	(Poland)	CB / DM	14 October 1993 (age 31)	2023	2025	(Russia) FC Ural Yekaterinburg	Free
11	Kacper Chodyna	(Poland)	RW	24 May 1999 (age 26)	2024	2028	(Poland) Zagłębie Lubin	€0.86M
20	Jakub Żewłakow (U23)	(Poland)	AM	2 December 2006 (age 18)		2027	(Poland) Legia Warsaw II	Free
21	Vahan Bichakhchyan	(Armenia)	RW	9 July 1999 (age 25)	2025	2028	(Poland) Pogoń Szczecin	€0.25M
22	Juergen Elitim	(Colombia)	CM	13 July 1999 (age 25)	2023	2026	(England) Watford F.C.	Free
25	Ryōya Morishita	(Japan)	RW	11 April 1997 (age 28)	2023	2024	(Japan) Nagoya Grampus	Loan
44	Damian Szymański	(Poland)	CM	16 June 1995 (age 30)	2025	2029	(Greece) AEK Athens F.C.	Free
53	Wojciech Urbański (U23)	(Poland)	AM	12 January 2005 (age 20)	2023	2025	(Poland) Wisła Kraków U19	?
67	Bartosz Kapustka	(Poland)	CM	23 December 1996 (age 28)	2020	2026	(England) Leicester City F.C.	Free
77	Ermal Krasniqi	(Kosovo)	LW	7 September 1996 (age 26)	2025	2026	(Czech Republic) AC Sparta Prague	Loan
82	Kacper Urbański	(Poland)	AM	7 September 2004 (age 20)	2025	2028	(Italy) Bologna FC 1909	€.2.5M
99	Noah Weißhaupt	(Germany)	LW	20 September 2001 (age 23)	2025	2026	(Germany) SC Freiburg	Loan
	Aleksander Wyganowski (U23)	(Poland)	CM	11 June 2009 (age 16)	2023	2026	(Poland) Escola Varsovia	
Forwards
9	Migouel Alfarela	(France)	CF	15 February 1997 (age 28)	2024	2027	(France) SC Bastia	€1.4M
17	Illia Shkuryn	(Belarus)	CF	17 August 1999 (age 25)	2025	2028	(Poland) Stal Mielec	€1.5M
28	Marc Gual	(Spain)	CF	13 March 1996 (age 29)	2023	2026	(Poland) Jagiellonia Białystok	Free
29	Mileta Rajović	(Denmark)	CF	17 July 1999 (age 25)	2025	2029	(England) Watford F.C.	€3M
77	Jean-Pierre Nsame	(Cameroon)	CF	1 May 1993 (age 32)	2024	2025	(Italy) Como 1907	Loan

Notes:

- Player (U23) – Player who fulfils the PZPN's Młodzieżowiec 2.0 criteria, that is, Polish footballers who will be 21 years old or younger in the year the season ends (2026), so born in 2005 or later.
- – Player who left before the end of the season, but played in at least one official match.
- – Player who was loaned out before the end of the season, but played in at least one official match.

== Transfers ==
=== In ===
Date	Position	Player	From	Fee	Ref
16 May 2025	FW	(France) Migouel Alfarela	(Greece) Athens Kallithea F.C.	End of loan	
27 May 2025	DM	(Poland) Jakub Adkonis	(Poland) Ruch Chorzów	End of loan	
30 May 2025	FW	(Poland) Jordan Majchrzak	(Poland) Arka Gdynia	End of loan	
9 June 2025	FW	(Cameroon) Jean-Pierre Nsame	(Switzerland) FC St. Gallen	End of loan	
16 June 2025	FW	(Switzerland) Marco Burch	(Poland) Radomiak Radom	End of loan	
26 June 2025	RB	(Slovenia) Petar Stojanović	(Italy) US Salernitana 1919	Free	
15 July 2025	CF	(Denmark) Mileta Rajović	(England) Watford F.C.	€3M	
18 July 2025	LB	(Poland) Arkadiusz Reca	(Italy) Spezia Calcio	Free	
14 August 2025	CM	(Poland) Damian Szymański	(Greece) AEK Athens F.C.	Free	
15 August 2025	CM	(Portugal) Henrique Arreiol	(Portugal) Sporting CP	Free	
30 August 2025	CB	(Poland) Kamil Piątkowski	(Austria) FC Red Bull Salzburg	Free	
2 September 2025	AM	(Poland) Kacper Urbański	(Italy) Bologna FC 1909	€2.5M	

=== Out ===
Date	Position	Player	Next club	Fee	Ref
23 May 2025	RW	(Brazil) Luquinhas	(Brazil) Fortaleza Esporte Clube	End of loan	
23 May 2025	FW	(Czech Republic) Tomáš Pekhart	free agent	End of contract	
3 June 2025	GK	(Bosnia and Herzegovina) Vladan Kovačević	(Portugal) Sporting CP	End of loan	
16 June 2025	GK	(Poland) Maciej Kikolski	(Poland) Widzew Łódź	€0.3M	
16 July 2025	DM	(Poland) Maxi Oyedele	(France) RC Strasbourg Alsace	€6M (€3.6M) (Note: Former Oyedele's club, Manchester United, received 40% of the transfer fee.)	
18 July 2025	RF	(Poland) Jakub Jędrasik	(Poland) Pogoń Grodzisk Mazowiecki	Released	
8 August 2025	CF	(Poland) Jordan Majchrzak	(Germany) VfB Stuttgart	€0.15M	
9 August 2025	CF	(Spain) Marc Gual	(Portugal) Rio Ave F.C.	€0.25M	
25 August 2025	RW	(Japan) Ryōya Morishita	(England) Blackburn Rovers F.C.	€2.00M	
29 August 2025	CB	(Poland) Jan Ziółkowski	(Italy) AS Roma	€6.60M	

=== Loaned in ===
Date	Position	Player	From	Date until	Ref
25 August 2025	LW	(Kosovo) Ermal Krasniqi	(Czech Republic) AC Sparta Prague	End of season	
1 September 2025	LW	(Germany) Noah Weißhaupt	(Germany) SC Freiburg	End of season	

=== Loaned out ===
Date	Position	Player	To	Date until	Ref
25 June 2025	AM	(Poland) Igor Strzałek	(Poland) Bruk-Bet Termalica Nieciecza	End of season	
9 July 2025	CB	(Spain) Sergio Barcia	(Spain) UD Las Palmas	End of season	
18 July 2025	DM	(Poland) Jakub Adkonis	(Poland) Pogoń Grodzisk Mazowiecki	End of season	
18 July 2025	CF	(Poland) Stanisław Gieroba	(Poland) Pogoń Grodzisk Mazowiecki	End of season	
18 July 2025	RB	(Poland) Oliwier Olewiński	(Poland) Pogoń Grodzisk Mazowiecki	End of season	
18 July 2025	RW	(Poland) Mateusz Szczepaniak	(Poland) Pogoń Grodzisk Mazowiecki	End of season	
18 July 2025	CB	(Poland) Bartosz Dembek	(Poland) Pogoń Siedlce	End of season	

=== Overall transfer activity ===
==== Expenditure ====
Summer: €3M

Winter:

Total: €3M

==== Income ====
Summer: €12.9M

Winter:

Total: €12.9M

==== Net totals ====
Summer: €9.9M

Winter:

Total: €9.9M

== Pre-season and friendlies ==
Win Draw Loss Fixtures

=== Pre-season friendlies ===
21 June 2025	Legia Warsaw	2–3	Wisła Płock	Książenice
12:00 CEST	Alfarela 6'; Augustyniak 45'	Report	Strózik 3'; Famulak 49'; Jime 62'	Stadium: Legia Training Center

25 June 2025	Legia Warsaw	2–2	PFC Ludogorets Razgrad	Waidring, Austria
00:00 CEST		Report		Stadium: Dr. Gredler & Dr. Schwentner Arena; Referee: Nenad Kostacevic (Tyrol)

30 June 2025	Legia Warsaw	1–0	FK Jablonec	Leogang, Austria
00:00 CEST		Report		Stadium: Steinbergstadion; Referee: Sebastian Gishamer (Salzburg)

== Competitions ==
=== Overview ===
Competition	First match	Last match	Starting round	Final position	Record							
Competition	First match	Last match	Starting round	Final position	Pld	W	D	L	GF	GA	GD	Win %
Ekstraklasa	27 Jul 2025	23 May 2026	Matchday 1	Matchday 34	31	9	13	9	35	36	−1	29.03
Polish Super Cup	13 July 2025		Final	Winners	1	1	0	0	2	1	+1	100.00
Polish Cup	30 Oct 2025		Round of 32		0	0	0	0	0	0	+0	—
UEFA Europa League	10 Jul 2025	14 Aug 2025	First qualifying round	Third qualifying round	6	4	1	1	9	8	+1	66.67
UEFA Conference League	21 Aug 2025	18 Dec 2025	Play-off round	League Phase	8	3	1	4	13	12	+1	37.50
Total					46	17	15	14	59	57	+2	36.96

Last updated: 6 May 2026
Source: Soccerway

=== Polish Super Cup ===
As the reigning Polish Cup winners Legia Warsaw faced Lech Poznań, Ekstraklasa champion, in the traditional season opener.

13 July 2025 Final	Lech Poznań	1–2	Legia Warsaw	Poznań
18:00 CEST	Szymczak 81'	Report	Wszołek 33'; Shkurin 43'	Stadium: Poznań Stadium; Attendance: 40,368; Referee: Łukasz Kuźma

=== Ekstraklasa ===
==== League table ====
Pos	Team	Pld	W	D	L	GF	GA	GD	Pts	Qualification or relegation
4	Raków Częstochowa	34	16	7	11	51	40	+11	55	Qualification for the Conference League second qualifying round
5	GKS Katowice	34	14	8	12	51	45	+6	50	Qualification for the Conference League second qualifying round
6	Legia Warsaw	34	12	13	9	42	37	+5	49	
7	Zagłębie Lubin	34	13	9	12	45	38	+7	48	
8	Wisła Płock	34	12	10	12	34	38	−4	46	

Source: ekstraklasa.org 90minut.pl
Rules for classification: 1) Points; 2) Head-to-head points; 3) Head-to-head goal difference; 4) Goal difference; 5) Goals scored; 6) Number of wins; 7) Number of away wins; 8) Lower number of points based on yellow and red cards (red card = 3 points, yellow card = 1 point, sending-off = 3 points - including 1 point for first yellow card); 9) Fairplay ranking; 10) Draw.
(Note: Head-to-head record is used only after all the matches between the teams in question have been played)

==== Results summary ====
Overall								Home						Away					
Pld	W	D	L	GF	GA	GD	Pts	W	D	L	GF	GA	GD	W	D	L	GF	GA	GD
31	9	13	9	35	36	−1	40	7	6	3	19	12	+7	2	7	6	16	24	−8

Last updated: 6 May 2026.

==== Results by round ====
Round	1^{a}	2	3	4	5	6^{b}	7	8	9	6^{b}	10	11	12	13	14	15	16	17	18	1^{a}	19	20	21	22	23	24	25	26	27	28	39	30	31	32	33	34
Ground	–	A	H	H	A	–	A	H	A	H	H	A	A	H	A	H	H	A	A	H	H	A	A	H	A	H	A	H	A	H	H	A	H	A	A	H
Result	–	W	D	W	L	–	L	W	D	D	W	L	L	D	D	L	D	D	L	L	L	D	D	W	D	W	D	D	W	D	W	L	W			
Position	9	6	8	2	5	9	13	8	7	7	6	8	9	10	10	11	13	15	15	17	17	16	17	16	16	16	16	15	15	14	10	15	11			
Points	0	3	4	7	7	7	7	10	11	12	15	15	15	16	17	17	18	19	19	19	19	20	21	24	25	28	29	30	33	34	37	37	40			

Updated to match(es) played on 6 May 2026. Source: PKO Ekstraklasa
A = Away; H = Home; W = Win; D = Draw; L = Loss

^{a} Matchday 1 game vs Piast Gliwice was postponed due to Europa League qualification

^{b} Matchday 6 game vs Jagiellonia Białystok was postponed due to Conference League qualification

==== Matches ====
27 July 2025 2	Korona Kielce	0–2	Legia Warsaw	Kielce
20:15 CEST		Report	Nsame 9'; Alfarela 47'	Stadium: Arena Kielce; Attendance: 13,952; Referee: Szymon Marciniak

3 August 2025 3	Legia Warsaw	0–0	Arka Gdynia	Warsaw
20:15 CEST		Report		Stadium: Polish Army Stadium; Attendance: 26,415; Referee: Piotr Lasyk

10 August 2025 4	Legia Warsaw	3–1	GKS Katowice	Warsaw
20:15 CEST	Wszołek 43'; Jędrzejczyk 90+5'; Morishita 90+7'	Report	Nowak 84'	Stadium: Polish Army Stadium; Attendance: 22,488; Referee: Damian Kos

17 August 2025 5	Wisła Płock	1–0	Legia Warsaw	Płock
20:15 CEST	Kamiński 11'	Report		Stadium: Kazimierz Górski Stadium; Attendance: 14,256; Referee: Łukasz Kuźma

31 August 2025 7	Cracovia	2–1	Legia Warsaw	Kraków
20:15 CEST	Stojilković 24'; Perković 66'	Report	Rajović 46'	Stadium: Józef Piłsudski Cracovia Stadium; Attendance: 14,016; Referee: Piotr Lasyk

14 September 2025 8	Legia Warsaw	4–1	Radomiak Radom	Warsaw
14:45 CEST	Elitim 41'; Szymański 69'; Rajović 72'; Wszołek 80'	Report	Dieguez 90+5'	Stadium: Polish Army Stadium; Attendance: 27,019; Referee: Szymon Marciniak

20 September 2025 9	Raków Częstochowa	1–1	Legia Warsaw	Częstochowa
20:15 CEST	Lopez 45+7'	Report	Stojanović 41'	Stadium: Miejski Stadion Piłkarski Raków; Attendance: 5,500; Referee: Jarosław Przybył

24 September 2025 6	Legia Warsaw	0–0	Jagiellonia Białystok	Warsaw
21:00 CEST		Report		Stadium: Polish Army Stadium; Attendance: 24,884; Referee: Damian Sylwestrzak

28 September 2025 10	Legia Warsaw	1–0	Pogoń Szczecin	Warsaw
17:30 CEST	Rajović 4'	Report		Stadium: Polish Army Stadium; Attendance: 25,127; Referee: Wojciech Myć

5 October 2025 11	Górnik Zabrze	3–1	Legia Warsaw	Zabrze
20:15 CEST	Khlan 22'; Sow 31'; Sow 83'	Report	Bichakhchyan 4'	Stadium: Arena Zabrze; Attendance: 26,501; Referee: Łukasz Kuźma

19 October 2025 11	Zagłębie Lubin	3–1	Legia Warsaw	Lubin
17:30 CEST	Piątkowski 31' (o.g.); Rocha 45+1'; Sypek 90+6'	Report	Szmyt 53' (o.g.)	Stadium: Lubin Stadium; Attendance: 13,106; Referee: Patryk Gryckiewicz

26 October 2025 13	Legia Warsaw	0–0	Lech Poznań	Warsaw
20:15 CET		Report		Stadium: Polish Army Stadium; Attendance: 26,498; Referee: Piotr Lasyk

2 November 2025 14	Widzew Łódź	1–1	Legia Warsaw	Łódź
20:15 CET	Bergier 66' (pen.)	Report	Krasniqi 85'	Stadium: Stadion Widzewa; Attendance: 17,894; Referee: Patryk Gryckiewicz

9 November 2025 15	Legia Warsaw	1–2	Bruk-Bet Termalica Nieciecza	Warsaw
14:45 CET	Krasniqi 73'	Report	Kubica 23' *Trubeha 90+4'	Stadium: Polish Army Stadium; Attendance: 22,205; Referee: Karol Arys

22 November 2025 16	Legia Warsaw	2–2	Lechia Gdańsk	Warsaw
20:15 CET	Kapustka 53' *Urbański 90+4'	Report	Żelizko 42' *Ćirković 77'	Stadium: Polish Army Stadium; Attendance: 21,138; Referee: Paweł Malec

1 December 2025 17	Motor Lublin	1–1	Legia Warsaw	Lublin
19:00 CET	Czubak 11' (pen.)	Report	Augustyniak 25'	Stadium: Arena Lublin; Attendance: 15,200; Referee: Piotr Lasyk

6 December 2025 18	Piast Gliwice	2–0	Legia Warsaw	Gliwice
20:15 CET	Chrapek 85' *Félix 90+3' (pen.)	Report		Stadium: Stadion Miejski w Gliwicach; Attendance: 15,410; Referee: Łukasz Kuźma

14 December 2025 1	Legia Warsaw	0–1	Piast Gliwice	Warsaw
20:15 CET		Report	Chrapek 83'	Stadium: Polish Army Stadium; Attendance: 17,516; Referee: Mohammad Al-Emara

1 February 2026 19	Legia Warsaw	1–2	Korona Kielce	Warsaw
17:30 CET	Kapustka 76' (pen.)	Report	Stępiński 23' 90'	Stadium: Polish Army Stadium; Attendance: 14,585; Referee: Patryk Gryckiewicz

7 February 2026 20	Arka Gdynia	2–2	Legia Warsaw	Gdynia
14:45 CET	Marcjanik 26' *Rusyn 58'	Report	Čolak 90' 90+4'	Stadium: Stadion GOSiR; Attendance: 12,497; Referee: Wojciech Myć

13 February 2026 21	GKS Katowice	1–1	Legia Warsaw	Katowice
20:30 CET	Galán 45+3'	Report	Bichakhchyan 26'	Stadium: Arena Katowice; Attendance: 14,279; Referee: Damian Sylwestrzak

21 February 2026 22	Legia Warsaw	2–1	Wisła Płock	Warsaw
20:30 CET	Adamski 23' *Chodyna 83'	Report	Nowak 73'	Stadium: Polish Army Stadium; Attendance: 18,378; Referee: Jarosław Przybył

1 March 2026 23	Jagiellonia Białystok	2–2	Legia Warsaw	Białystok
14:45 CET	Flach 17' *Pululu 22'	Report	Vital 45' (o.g.) *Flach 56' (o.g.)	Stadium: Białystok City Stadium; Attendance: 20,048; Referee: Karol Arys

8 March 2026 24	Legia Warsaw	1–0	Cracovia	Warsaw
20:15 CET	Rajović 31'	Report		Stadium: Polish Army Stadium; Attendance: 21,083; Referee: Patryk Gryckiewicz

13 March 2026 25	Radomiak Radom	1–1	Legia Warsaw	Radom
20:30 CET	Maurides 2'	Report	Pankov 7'	Stadium: Stadion im. Braci Czachorów; Attendance: 13,902; Referee: Piotr Lasyk

22 March 2026 26	Legia Warsaw	1–1	Raków Częstochowa	Warsaw
20:15 CET	Nsame 71' (pen.)	Report	Diaby-Fadiga 6'	Stadium: Polish Army Stadium; Attendance: 24,788; Referee: Łukasz Kuźma

6 April 2026 27	Pogoń Szczecin	0–2	Legia Warsaw	Szczecin
17:30 CEST		Report	Rajović 32' 46'	Stadium: Stadion Miejski im. Floriana Krygiera; Attendance: 20,602; Referee: Wojciech Myć

11 April 2026 28	Legia Warsaw	1–1	Górnik Zabrze	Warsaw
20:15 CEST	Augustyniak 82' (pen.)	Report	Bochniewicz 90+6'	Stadium: Polish Army Stadium; Attendance: 26,635; Referee: Damian Kos

17 April 2026 29	Legia Warsaw	1–0	Zagłębie Lubin	Warsaw
20:30 CEST	Adamski 29'	Report		Stadium: Polish Army Stadium; Attendance: 25,042; Referee: Koki Nagamine

26 April 2026 30	Lech Poznań	4–0	Legia Warsaw	Poznań
17:30 CEST	Gholizadeh 3' *Ishak 31' 43' *Gurgul 38'	Report		Stadium: Poznań Stadium; Attendance: 40,810; Referee: Piotr Lasyk

1 May 2026 31	Legia Warsaw	1–0	Widzew Łódź	Warsaw
20:30 CEST	Rafał Adamski 90+5'	Report		Stadium: Polish Army Stadium; Attendance: 28,103; Referee: Wojciech Myć

10 May 2026 32	Bruk-Bet Termalica Nieciecza	0–1	Legia Warsaw	Nieciecza
17:30 CEST		Report	Rafał Adamski 19'	Stadium: Stadion Sportowy Bruk-Bet Termalica; Attendance: 4,595; Referee: Karol Arys

17 May 2026 33	Lechia Gdańsk	1–2	Legia Warsaw	Gdańsk
17:30 CEST	Bobček 63'	Report	Nsame 11' *Čolak 90+4'	Stadium: Stadion Gdańsk; Attendance: 35,000; Referee: Damian Sylwestrzak

23 May 2026 34	Legia Warsaw	4–0	Motor Lublin	Warsaw
17:30 CEST	Nsame 32' 55' *Chodyna 39' *Elitim 48'	Report		Stadium: Polish Army Stadium; Attendance: 27,432; Referee: Jarosław Przybył

=== Polish Cup ===
30 October 2025 Round of 32	Legia Warsaw	1–2 (a.e.t.)	Pogoń Szczecin	Warsaw
21:00 CET (UTC+01:00)	Piątkowski 77'	90minut Łączy nas piłka	Grosicki 58'; Przyborek 117'	Stadium: Polish Army Stadium; Attendance: 18,741; Referee: Szymon Marciniak (Płock)

=== UEFA Europa League ===
==== First qualifying round ====
10 July 2025 First leg	Legia Warsaw	1–0	(Kazakhstan) Aktobe	Warsaw, Poland
21:00 CEST	Bichakhchyan 25'	Report		Stadium: Polish Army Stadium; Attendance: 12,239; Referee: Dalibor Černý

17 July 2025 Second leg	Aktobe (Kazakhstan)	0–1 (0–2 agg.)	(Poland) Legia Warsaw	Actobe, Kazakhstan
18:00 CEST		Report	Elitim 90+1'	Stadium: Koblandy Batyr Stadium; Referee: Granit Maqedonci

==== Second qualifying round ====
24 July 2025 First leg	Banik Ostrava (Czech Republic)	2–2	Legia Warsaw	Ostrava, Czechia
19:00 CEST	Šín 12'; Frydrych 64'	Report	Kapustka 32'; Nsame 88'	Stadium: Ostrava Stadium; Attendance: 15,047; Referee: Christian-Petru Ciochirca

31 July 2025 Second leg	Legia Warsaw	2–1 (4–3 agg.)	(Czech Republic) Banik Ostrava	Warsaw, Poland
21:00 CEST	Nsame 54'; Pojezný 15' (o.g.)	Report	Prekop 15'	Stadium: Polish Army Stadium; Attendance: 20,226; Referee: Novak Simović

==== Third qualifying round ====
7 August 2025 First leg	AEK Larnaca (Cyprus)	4–1	Legia Warsaw	Larnaca, Cyprus
18:30 CEST	Pons 16'; Angielski 48'; Chacon 78'; Rajović , 85' (o.g.)	Report	Nsame 18'	Stadium: AEK Arena; Attendance: 4,102; Referee: Horațiu Feșnic

14 August 2025 Second leg	Legia Warsaw	2–1 (3–5 agg.)	(Cyprus) AEK Larnaca	Warsaw, Poland
21:00 CEST	Nsame 11'; Rajović 16'	Report	Ivanović 53'	Stadium: Polish Army Stadium; Attendance: 23,673; Referee: Andris Treimanis

=== UEFA Conference League ===
==== Fourth qualifying round ====
21 August 2025 First leg	Hibernian (Scotland)	1–2	Legia Warsaw	Edinburgh, Scotland
21:00 CEST	Mulligan 86'	Report	Nsame 35'; Wszołek 45+3'	Stadium: Easter Road; Referee: Mohammad Al-Emara

28 August 2025 Second leg	Legia Warsaw	3–3	Hibernian (Scotland)	Warsaw, Poland
21:00 CEST	Bichakhchyan 13'; Elitim 90+3'; Rajović 98'	Report	Bushiri 50'; Boyle 59'; Chaiwa 61'	Stadium: Polish Army Stadium; Attendance: 27,659; Referee: Lawrence Visser

==== League phase ====
===== Table =====
Pos	Team	Pld	W	D	L	GF	GA	GD	Pts
26	(Gibraltar Football Association) Lincoln Red Imps	6	2	1	3	7	15	−8	7
27	(Ukrainian Association of Football) Dynamo Kyiv	6	2	0	4	9	9	0	6
28	(Polish Football Association) Legia Warsaw	6	2	0	4	8	8	0	6
29	(Slovak Football Association) Slovan Bratislava	6	2	0	4	5	9	−4	6
30	(Football Association of Iceland) Breiðablik	6	1	2	3	6	11	−5	5

Source: UEFA
Rules for classification: League phase tiebreakers

===== Result by round =====
Round	1	2	3	4	5	6
Ground	H	A	A	H	A	H
Result	L	W	L	L	L	W
Position	23	18	25	28	30	28
Points	0	3	3	3	3	6

Updated to match(es) played on 23 October 2025. Source: UEFA
A = Away; H = Home; W = Win; D = Draw; L = Loss

Win Draw Loss Fixtures

===== Matches =====
2 October 2025 1	Legia Warsaw	0–1	(Turkey) Samsunspor	Warsaw, Poland
21:00 CEST		Report	Musaba 10'	Stadium: Polish Army Stadium; Attendance: 18,712; Referee: Jérémie Pignard (France)

23 October 2025 2	Shakhtar Donetsk (Ukraine)	1–2	Legia Warsaw	Kraków, Poland
18:45 CEST	Marlon (yellow card) 33'; Meirelles 61'; Konoplya (yellow card) 82'; Nazaryna (yellow card) 90+3'	Report	Augustyniak 16', 90+4'; Rajović (yellow card) 43'	Stadium: Henryk Reyman Stadium; Attendance: 13,936; Referee: Gustavo Correia (Portugal)
Note: Due to the Russian invasion of Ukraine, Ukrainian teams were required to play their home matches at neutral venues until further notice.

6 November 2025 3	Celje (Slovenia)	2–1	(Poland) Legia Warsaw	Stadion Z'dežele, Celje
18:45	Iosifov 72'; Karničnik 77'	Report	Urbański 17'	Attendance: 8,000; Referee: Javier Alberola Rojas (Spain)

27 November 2025 4	Legia Warsaw (Poland)	0–1	(Czech Republic) Sparta Prague	Polish Army Stadium, Warsaw
21:00		Report	Preciado 41'	Attendance: 17,743; Referee: Anastasios Sidiropoulos (Greece)

11 December 2025 5	Noah (Armenia)	2–1	(Poland) Legia Warsaw	Vazgen Sargsyan Republican Stadium, Yerevan
18:45 (21:45 UTC+4)	Aiás 57'; Mulahusejnović 84'	Report	Rajović 3'	Attendance: 8,500; Referee: Bulat Sariyev (Kazakhstan)

18 December 2025 6	Legia Warsaw (Poland)	4–1	(Gibraltar) Lincoln Red Imps	Polish Army Stadium, Warsaw
21:00	Čolak 21'; Kapustka 62'; Rajović 70'; Bichakhchyan 83'	Report	De Barr 89'	Attendance: 9,429; Referee: Danilo Nikolić (Serbia)

== Statistics ==
=== Goalscorers ===
Rank	Number	Position	Nation	Name	Supercup	Ekstraklasa	Polish Cup	UEFA Europa League	UEFA Conference League	Total	Career club total
1	18	CF	(Cameroon)	Jean-Pierre Nsame	0	1	0	4	1	6	8
3	29	CF	(Denmark)	Mileta Rajović	0	3	0	1	1	5	5
2	13	RW	(Poland)	Paweł Wszołek	1	2	0	0	1	4	41
4	22	CM	(Colombia)	Juergen Elitim	0	1	0	1	1	3	5
5	21	RW	(Armenia)	Vahan Bichakhchyan	0	0	0	1	1	2	2
6	17	CF	(Belarus)	Ilya Shkurin	1	0	0	0	0	1	5
7	67	CM	(Poland)	Bartosz Kapustka	0	0	0	1	0	1	22
8	17	CF	(France)	Migouel Alfarela	0	1	0	0	0	1	2
9	55	CB	(Poland)	Artur Jędrzejczyk	0	1	0	0	0	1	11
10	25	RW	(Japan)	Ryōya Morishita	0	1	0	0	0	1	15
11	44	DM	(Poland)	Damian Szymański	0	1	0	0	0	1	0
12	30	RB	(Slovenia)	Petar Stojanović	0	1	0	0	0	1	1
Own goals								1	0	1	
TOTALS					2	12	0	9	5	28	

Last updated: 1 Oct 2025.
Source: FBref.com

==== Hat-tricks ====
Includes all competitions for senior teams. Players with no hat-tricks not included in the list.

Keys

- Score – The score at the time of each goal. Legia's score listed first.
- Final score – The score at full time; Legia's listed first.

=== Assists ===
Place	Number	Position	Nation	Name	Supercup	Ekstraklasa	Polish Cup	UEFA Europa League	UEFA Conference League	Total
1	7	RW	(Poland)	Paweł Wszołek	0	1	0	3	0	4
2	22	CM	(Spain)	Juergen Elitim	1	1	0	1	0	3
3	67	AM	(Poland)	Bartosz Kapustka	0	1	0	1	1	3
4	21	RW	(Armenia)	Vahan Bichakhchyan	0	1	0	1	0	2
5	33	RB	(Poland)	Patryk Kun	1	0	0	0	0	1
6	11	RW	(Poland)	Kacper Chodyna	0	0	0	1	0	1
7	17	CF	(France)	Migouel Alfarela	0	1	0	0	0	1
8	55	CB	(Poland)	Artur Jędrzejczyk	0	1	0	0	0	1
9	30	RB	(Slovenia)	Petar Stojanović	0	1	0	0	0	1
10	18	CF	(Cameroon)	Jean-Pierre Nsame	0	0	0	0	1	1
11	19	LB	(Portugal)	Rúben Vinagre	0	0	0	0	1	1
12	24	CB	(Poland)	Jan Ziółkowski	0	0	0	0	1	1
TOTALS					2	5	0	6	4	20

Last updated: 1 Oct 2025.
Source: FBref.com

=== Home attendances ===
Matches played behind closed doors for which tickets could not be sold are not counted.

	Matches	Total attendances	%	Average attendance	Highest attendance	%	Lowest attendance	%
Ekstraklasa	2	48,903	78,9%	24,452	26,415	85,2%	22,488	72,5%
Polish Cup								
UEFA Conference League	3	56,138	60,4%	18,713	23,673	76,3%	20,226	65,2%
All	5	105,041	67,8%	21,008	26,415	85,2%	12,239	39,5%

Last updated: 14 Aug 2025.
Source: legionisci.com

== Awards ==
=== Ekstraklasa Player of the Month ===
Month	Player	Ref.

=== Ekstraklasa Young Player of the Month ===
Month	Player	Ref.

== Milestones ==
=== Games ===
The following players made their competitive debuts for Legia's first team during the season.
