= List of Polish football transfers summer 2024 =

This is a list of Polish football transfers for the 2024 summer transfer window. Only transfers featuring Ekstraklasa are listed.

== Ekstraklasa ==
Note: Flags indicate national team as has been defined under FIFA eligibility rules. Players may hold more than one non-FIFA nationality.

=== Jagiellonia Białystok ===
In:

No.	Pos.	Nation	Player
1	GK	POL	Max Stryjek (from (England) Wycombe Wanderers, previously on loan at (England) Crewe Alexandra)
9	FW	FRA	Lamine Diaby-Fadiga (from (France) Paris FC)
20	MF	ESP	Miki Villar (from Wisła Kraków)
25	MF	POL	Filip Wolski (from Lech Poznań II)
44	DF	POR	João Moutinho (on loan from (Italy) Spezia)

Out:

No.	Pos.	Nation	Player
1	GK	SRB	Zlatan Alomerović (to (Cyprus) AEK Larnaca)
5	DF	BIH	Bojan Nastić (to Wisła Płock)
9	FW	GER	Kaan Caliskaner (loan return to (Germany) Eintracht Braunschweig)
18	MF	POL	Tomasz Kupisz (free agent)
21	FW	POL	Krzysztof Toporkiewicz (free agent)
27	DF	POL	Bartłomiej Wdowik (to (Portugal) Braga)
28	FW	ESP	José Naranjo (free agent)
31	DF	POL	Michał Ozga (free agent)
98	FW	BRA	Vinícius Matheus (free agent)
—	DF	POL	Kacper Tabiś (to Chrobry Głogów, previously on loan)
—	MF	POL	Oliwier Wojciechowski (to Polonia Warsaw, previously on loan)
—	MF	POL	Bartosz Bayer (free agent, previously on loan at Olimpia Zambrów)

=== Śląsk Wrocław ===
In:

No.	Pos.	Nation	Player
1	GK	POL	Tomasz Loska (from Bruk-Bet Termalica)
3	DF	POL	Serafin Szota (from Widzew Łódź)
9	FW	SUI	Junior Eyamba (from (Switzerland) Young Boys youth)
11	FW	POL	Sebastian Musiolik (from Górnik Zabrze)
14	DF	POL	Mateusz Bartolewski (from Ruch Chorzów)
18	MF	GER	Simon Schierack (from (Germany) RB Leipzig youth)
27	MF	POL	Filip Rejczyk (from Legia Warsaw)
77	MF	POL	Marcin Cebula (from Raków Częstochowa)
87	DF	BUL	Simeon Petrov (from (Bulgaria) CSKA 1948, previously on loan)

Out:

No.	Pos.	Nation	Player
9	FW	ESP	Erik Expósito (to (Qatar) Al Ahli)
19	DF	POL	Patryk Janasik (to Cracovia)
20	MF	BIH	Alen Mustafić (loan return to (Denmark) OB)
23	MF	POL	Daniel Łukasik (free agent)
27	DF	POL	Martin Konczkowski (to Ruch Chorzów)
28	MF	POL	Michał Rzuchowski (to Arka Gdynia)
31	FW	POL	Jakub Lutostański (to Pogoń Siedlce)
35	GK	POL	Kacper Trelowski (loan return to Raków Częstochowa)
36	MF	POL	Miłosz Kurowski (free agent)
39	GK	POL	Mateusz Górski (to GKS Tychy)
—	GK	POL	Oskar Mielcarz (on loan to Wieczysta Kraków, previously on loan at Wisła Puławy)

=== Legia Warsaw ===
In:

No.	Pos.	Nation	Player
5	MF	POR	Claude Gonçalves (from (Bulgaria) Ludogorets Razgrad)
11	MF	POL	Kacper Chodyna (from Zagłębie Lubin)
19	DF	POR	Rúben Vinagre (on loan from (Portugal) Sporting CP, previously on loan at (Italy) Hellas Verona)
31	GK	POL	Marcel Mendes-Dudziński (from (Portugal) Benfica B)
42	DF	ESP	Sergio Barcia (from (Spain) Mirandés)
77	FW	CMR	Jean-Pierre Nsame (on loan from (Italy) Como)
82	MF	BRA	Luquinhas (on loan from (Brazil) Fortaleza)

Out:

No.	Pos.	Nation	Player
5	DF	POR	Yuri Ribeiro (free agent)
11	MF	KOS	Qëndrim Zyba (loan return to (Kosovo) Ballkani)
17	MF	POR	Gil Dias (loan return to (Germany) VfB Stuttgart)
26	MF	POL	Filip Rejczyk (to Śląsk Wrocław)
27	MF	POR	Josué (free agent)
—	GK	POL	Maciej Kikolski (on loan to Radomiak Radom, previously on loan at GKS Tychy)
—	GK	POL	Cezary Miszta (to (Portugal) Rio Ave, previously on loan)
—	MF	POL	Bartłomiej Ciepiela (free agent, previously on loan at Resovia)

=== Pogoń Szczecin ===
In:

No.	Pos.	Nation	Player
31	GK	POL	Krzysztof Kamiński (from Wisła Płock)
77	GK	ROU	Valentin Cojocaru (from (Belgium) OH Leuven, previously on loan)

Out:

No.	Pos.	Nation	Player
10	FW	SVN	Luka Zahović (to Górnik Zabrze)
81	GK	POL	Bartosz Klebaniuk (to Znicz Pruszków)
83	GK	POL	Axel Holewiński (on loan to Polonia Bytom)
—	FW	POL	Kacper Kostorz (on loan to (Netherlands) NAC Breda, previously on loan at (Netherlands) Den Bosch)

=== Lech Poznań ===
In:

No.	Pos.	Nation	Player
3	DF	SWE	Alex Douglas (from (Sweden) Västerås)
19	FW	NOR	Bryan Fiabema (from (Spain) Real Sociedad B)

Out:

No.	Pos.	Nation	Player
3	DF	SCO	Barry Douglas (free agent)
19	MF	POL	Maksymilian Dziuba (on loan to GKS Tychy)
30	MF	GEO	Nika Kvekveskiri (free agent)
33	GK	POL	Mateusz Pruchniewski (on loan to Pogoń Siedlce)
44	DF	POL	Alan Czerwiński (to GKS Katowice)
90	FW	POL	Artur Sobiech (free agent)
—	GK	POL	Krzysztof Bąkowski (on loan to Stal Rzeszów, previously on loan at Polonia Warsaw)

=== Górnik Zabrze ===
In:

No.	Pos.	Nation	Player
1	GK	POL	Filip Majchrowicz (from Radomiak Radom)
7	FW	SVN	Luka Zahović (from Pogoń Szczecin)
8	MF	CZE	Patrik Hellebrand (from (Czech Republic) České Budějovice)
18	MF	CZE	Lukáš Ambros (from (Germany) VfL Wolfsburg, previously on loan at (Germany) Freiburg II)
20	DF	ESP	Josema (from Ruch Chorzów)
22	DF	ESP	Manu Sánchez (from (Spain) Castellón)
44	FW	POL	Aleksander Buksa (from (Italy) Genoa, previously on loan at (Austria) WSG Tirol)

Out:

No.	Pos.	Nation	Player
1	GK	POL	Daniel Bielica (to (Netherlands) NAC Breda)
2	DF	SVK	Boris Sekulić (to (Cyprus) Karmiotissa)
7	FW	SVK	Adrián Kaprálik (loan return to (Slovakia) Žilina)
8	MF	ESP	Dani Pacheco (free agent)
9	FW	POL	Sebastian Musiolik (to Śląsk Wrocław)
13	DF	GRE	Konstantinos Triantafyllopoulos (to (Greece) Asteras Tripolis)
24	MF	POL	Krzysztof Kolanko (to Zagłębie Lubin II)
25	DF	SVK	Michal Sipľak (to Puszcza Niepołomice)
55	MF	POL	Szymon Czyż (loan return to Raków Częstochowa)
—	FW	POL	Jan Ciućka (on loan to Rekord Bielsko-Biała, previously on loan at Skra Częstochowa)
—	MF	POL	Mateusz Chmarek (to Ruch Chorzów, previously on loan at GKS Jastrzębie)

=== Raków Częstochowa ===
In:

No.	Pos.	Nation	Player
6	MF	GRE	Vasilios Sourlis (from (Greece) Asteras Tripolis)
9	FW	POL	Patryk Makuch (from Cracovia)
77	GK	NOR	Kristoffer Klaesson (from (England) Leeds United)
84	FW	BRA	Adriano Amorim (from (Brazil) Coimbra)
97	MF	GRE	Lazaros Lamprou (from (Netherlands) Excelsior)

Out:

No.	Pos.	Nation	Player
1	GK	BIH	Vladan Kovačević (to (Portugal) Sporting CP)
16	DF	POL	Oskar Krzyżak (to Pogoń Siedlce)
18	DF	POL	Adrian Gryszkiewicz (free agent)
28	MF	POL	Patryk Malamis (to Górnik Łęczna)
66	MF	GRE	Giannis Papanikolaou (to (Turkey) Çaykur Rizespor)
77	MF	POL	Marcin Cebula (to Śląsk Wrocław)
89	GK	POL	Kacper Bieszczad (loan return to Zagłębie Lubin)
—	MF	POL	Daniel Szelągowski (free agent)
—	GK	POL	Jakub Mądrzyk (on loan to Stal Mielec, previously on loan at Miedź Legnica)
—	MF	POL	Tobiasz Kubik (on loan to GKS Tychy, previously on loan at Skra Częstochowa)
—	GK	POL	Xavier Dziekoński (to Korona Kielce, previously on loan)
—	MF	POL	Wiktor Długosz (to Korona Kielce, previously on loan at Ruch Chorzów)

=== Zagłębie Lubin ===
In:

No.	Pos.	Nation	Player
—	MF	POL	Adam Radwański (from Bruk-Bet Termalica)
—	MF	POL	Kajetan Szmyt (from Warta Poznań)
—	FW	CZE	Václav Sejk (on loan from (Czech Republic) Sparta Prague, previously on loan at (Netherlands) Roda JC)

Out:

No.	Pos.	Nation	Player
7	MF	POL	Kacper Chodyna (to Legia Warsaw)
20	MF	SRB	Marko Poletanović (to (Serbia) Vojvodina)
22	GK	POL	Szymon Weirauch (to Lechia Gdańsk)
—	FW	POL	Szymon Kobusiński (to Polonia Warsaw, previously on loan)

=== Widzew Łódź ===
In:

No.	Pos.	Nation	Player

Out:

No.	Pos.	Nation	Player
5	DF	POL	Serafin Szota (to Śląsk Wrocław)

=== Piast Gliwice ===
In:

No.	Pos.	Nation	Player

Out:

No.	Pos.	Nation	Player

=== Stal Mielec ===
In:

No.	Pos.	Nation	Player
—	GK	POL	Jakub Mądrzyk (on loan from Raków Częstochowa, previously on loan at Miedź Legnica)

Out:

No.	Pos.	Nation	Player

=== Puszcza Niepołomice ===
In:

No.	Pos.	Nation	Player
18	DF	SVK	Michal Sipľak (from Górnik Zabrze)

Out:

No.	Pos.	Nation	Player

=== Cracovia ===
In:

No.	Pos.	Nation	Player
77	DF	POL	Patryk Janasik (from Śląsk Wrocław)

Out:

No.	Pos.	Nation	Player
7	FW	POL	Patryk Makuch (to Raków Częstochowa)

=== Korona Kielce ===
In:

No.	Pos.	Nation	Player
55	GK	POL	Xavier Dziekoński (from Raków Częstochowa, previously on loan)
—	MF	POL	Wiktor Długosz (from Raków Częstochowa, previously on loan at Ruch Chorzów)

Out:

No.	Pos.	Nation	Player

=== Radomiak Radom ===
In:

No.	Pos.	Nation	Player
1	GK	POL	Maciej Kikolski (on loan from Legia Warsaw, previously on loan at GKS Tychy)

Out:

No.	Pos.	Nation	Player
1	GK	POL	Filip Majchrowicz (to Górnik Zabrze)

=== Lechia Gdańsk ===
In:

No.	Pos.	Nation	Player
—	GK	POL	Szymon Weirauch (from Zagłębie Lubin)

Out:

No.	Pos.	Nation	Player

=== GKS Katowice ===
In:

No.	Pos.	Nation	Player
—	DF	POL	Alan Czerwiński (from Lech Poznań)

Out:

No.	Pos.	Nation	Player

=== Motor Lublin ===
In:

No.	Pos.	Nation	Player

Out:

No.	Pos.	Nation	Player

== See also ==
- 2024–25 Ekstraklasa
