= 2024–25 Legia Warsaw season =

Legia Warsaw
2024–25 season
- Chairman: Dariusz Mioduski
- Coach: Gonçalo Feio
- Stadium: Polish Army Stadium
- Ekstraklasa: 5th
- Polish Cup: Winners
- UEFA Conference League: Quarter-finals
- Top goalscorer: League: Bartosz Kapustka (9); All: Marc Gual (19)
- Highest home attendance: 29,055 v Chelsea FC (10 Apr 2025, Conference League)
- Lowest home attendance: 18,406 v Puszcza Niepołomice (15 Feb 2025, Ekstraklasa)
- Average home league attendance: 24,867
- Biggest win: 6–0 v Caernarfon Town FC (Home, 25 Jul 2024, Conference League)
- Biggest defeat: 0–3 v Chelsea FC (Home, 10 Apr 2025, Conference League)
Home colours	Away colours	Third colours

The 2024–25 season was Legia Warsaw's 108th season in existence and the club's 77th consecutive season in the top flight of Polish football. In addition to the domestic league, they also participated in this season's editions of the Polish Cup and UEFA Conference League. The season covered the period from 1 July 2024 to 24 May 2025.

== First team ==
=== Coaching staff ===
Position	Name
Head coach	(Portugal) Gonçalo Feio
Assistant coaches	(Spain) Inaki Astiz, (Portugal) Emanuel Ribeiro
Goalkeeping coaches	(Poland) Arkadiusz Malarz, (Poland) Krzysztof Dowhań
Fitness coaches	(Poland) Bartosz Bibrowicz, (Poland) Dawid Goliński, (Spain) Jose Antonio Asian Clemente
Analysts	(Poland) Piotr Parchan

- Last updated: June 2024

=== First-team squad ===
No.	Player	Nat.	Positions	Date of birth (age)	Signed in	Contract ends	Previous club	Transfer fee
Goalkeepers
1	Kacper Tobiasz	(Poland)	GK	4 November 2002 (age 21)	2020	2026	(Poland) Legia Warsaw II	Free
23	Gabriel Kobylak	(Poland)	GK	20 February 2002 (age 22)	2020	2027	(Poland) Legia Warsaw II	Free
31	Marcel Mendes-Dudziński (U23)	(Poland)	GK	14 May 2004 (age 20)	2024	2028	(Portugal) S.L. Benfica	Free
77	Vladan Kovačević	(Bosnia and Herzegovina)	GK	11 April 1998 (age 26)	2025	2025	(Portugal) Sporting CP	Loan
Defenders
3	Steve Kapuadi	(Poland)	CB	30 April 1998 (age 26)	2023	2026	(Poland) Wisła Płock	Free
4	Marco Burch	(France)	CB	19 October 2000 (age 23)	2023	2029	(Switzerland) FC Luzern	€0.55-0.8M
12	Radovan Pankov	(Serbia)	CB	5 August 1995 (age 28)	2023	2026	(Serbia) Red Star Belgrade	Free
19	Rúben Vinagre	(Portugal)	LB / LW	9 April 1999 (age 25)	2024	2025	(Portugal) Sporting CP	Loan
24	Jan Ziółkowski (U23)	(Poland)	CB	5 June 2005 (age 19)	2023	2025	(Poland) Legia Warsaw II	Free
33	Patryk Kun	(Poland)	LB / LW	20 April 1995 (age 29)	2023	2026	(Poland) Raków Częstochowa	Free
42	Sergio Barcia	(Spain)	CB	31 December 2000 (age 23)	2024	2027	(Spain) CD Mirandés	€0.5M
55	Artur Jędrzejczyk	(Poland)	CB	4 November 1987 (age 36)	2017	2026	(Russia) FC Krasnodar	€0.9M
Midfielders
5	Claude Gonçalves	(Portugal)	DM	9 April 1994 (age 30)	2024	2027	(Bulgaria) PFC Ludogorets Razgrad	Free
	Ramil Mustafaev	(Russia)	CM	20 December 2003 (age 20)	2023	2025	(Poland) Stal Rzeszów	Free
6	Maxi Oyedele	(Poland)	DM / CM	7 November 2004 (age 19)	2024		(England) Manchester United F.C.	
8	Rafał Augustyniak	(Poland)	CB / DM	14 October 1993 (age 30)	2023	2025	(Russia) FC Ural Yekaterinburg	Free
11	Kacper Chodyna	(Poland)	RW	24 May 1999 (age 25)	2024	2028	(Poland) Zagłębie Lubin	€0.86M
13	Paweł Wszołek	(Poland)	RW	30 April 1992 (age 32)	2022	2025	(Germany) 1. FC Union Berlin	Free
16	Jurgen Çelhaka	(Albania)	CM	6 December 2000 (age 23)	2021	2025	(Albania) KF Tirana	€0.25M
20	Jakub Żewłakow (U23)	(Poland)	AM	2 December 2006 (age 17)		2027	(Poland) Legia Warsaw II	Free
21	Vahan Bichakhchyan	(Armenia)	RW	9 July 1999 (age 24)	2025	2028	(Poland) Pogoń Szczecin	€0.25M
22	Juergen Elitim	(Colombia)	CM	13 July 1999 (age 24)	2023	2026	(England) Watford F.C.	Free
25	Ryōya Morishita	(Japan)	RW	11 April 1997 (age 27)	2023	2024	(Japan) Nagoya Grampus	Loan
53	Wojciech Urbański (U23)	(Poland)	AM	12 January 2005 (age 19)	2023	2025	(Poland) Wisła Kraków U19	?
67	Bartosz Kapustka	(Poland)	CM	23 December 1996 (age 27)	2020	2026	(England) Leicester City F.C.	Free
71	Mateusz Szczepaniak (U23)	(Poland)	RW	5 January 2007 (age 17)		2025	(Poland) Legia Warsaw II	Free
80	Jakub Adkonis (U23)	(Poland)	DM / CM	10 June 2007 (age 17)		2026	(Poland) Legia Warsaw II	Free
82	Luquinhas	(Brazil)	AM	28 September 1996 (age 27)	2024	2025	(Brazil) Fortaleza Esporte Clube	Loan
86	Igor Strzałek (U23)	(Poland)	CM	19 January 2004 (age 20)		2026	(Poland) Legia Warsaw II	Free
	Aleksander Wyganowski (U23)	(Poland)	CM	11 June 2009 (age 15)	2023	2026	(Poland) Escola Varsovia	
Forwards
7	Tomáš Pekhart	(Czech Republic)	CF	26 May 1989 (age 35)	2023	2024	(Turkey) Gaziantep F.K.	Free
9	Blaž Kramer	(Slovenia)	CF	1 June 1996 (age 28)	2022	2025	(Switzerland) FC Zürich	Free
17	Migouel Alfarela	(France)	CF	15 February 1997 (age 27)	2024	2027	(France) SC Bastia	€1.4M
17	Illia Shkuryn	(Belarus)	CF	17 August 1999 (age 24)	2025	2028	(Poland) Stal Mielec	€1.5M
28	Marc Gual	(Spain)	CF	13 March 1996 (age 28)	2023	2026	(Poland) Jagiellonia Białystok	Free
39	Maciej Rosołek	(Poland)	CF	2 September 2001 (age 22)	2019	2024	(Poland) Legia Warsaw U19	Free
77	Jean-Pierre Nsame	(Cameroon)	CF	1 May 1993 (age 31)	2024	2025	(Italy) Como 1907	Loan
99	Jordan Majchrzak (U23)	(Poland)	CF	8 October 2004 (age 19)		2026	(Poland) Legia Warsaw II	Free

Notes:

- Player (U23) – Player who fulfils the Ekstraklasa's Pro Junior System, criteria, that is, Polish footballers who will be 22 years old or younger in the year the season ends (2025).
- – Player who left before the end of the season, but played in at least one official match.
- – Player who was loaned out before the end of the season, but played in at least one official match.

== Transfers ==
=== In ===
Date	Position	Player	From	Fee	Ref
12 June 2024	RW	(Poland) Kacper Chodyna	(Poland) Zagłębie Lubin	€0.86M	
15 June 2024	DM	(Portugal) Claude Gonçalves	(Bulgaria) PFC Ludogorets Razgrad	Free	
15 June 2024	FW	(Poland) Jordan Majchrzak	(Poland) Puszcza Niepołomice	End of loan	
15 June 2024	CM	(Poland) Jakub Kisiel	(Poland) Podbeskidzie Bielsko-Biała	End of loan	
15 June 2024	GK	(Poland) Maciej Kikolski	(Poland) GKS Tychy	End of loan	
15 June 2024	GK	(Poland) Gabriel Kobylak	(Poland) Radomiak Radom	End of loan	
15 June 2024	CM	(Poland) Igor Strzałek	(Poland) Stal Mielec	End of loan	
15 June 2024	LW	(Germany) Makana Baku	(Greece) OFI	End of loan	
3 July 2024	GK	(Poland) Marcel Mendes-Dudziński	(Portugal) S.L. Benfica	Free	
11 July 2024	CB	(Spain) Sergio Barcia	(Spain) CD Mirandés	€0.5M	
24 July 2024	CF	(France) Migouel Alfarela	(France) SC Bastia	€1.4M	
22 August 2024	DM	(Poland) Maxi Oyedele	(England) Manchester United F.C.		
16 January 2025	RW	(Armenia) Vahan Bichakhchyan	(Poland) Pogoń Szczecin	€0.25M	
6 February 2025	LB	(Portugal) Rúben Vinagre	(Portugal) Sporting CP	€2.3M	
20 February 2025	CF	(Poland) Illia Shkuryn	(Poland) Stal Mielec	€1.5M	

=== Out ===
Date	Position	Player	Next club	Fee	Ref
30 June 2024	CM	(Portugal) Josué Pesqueira	Unattached	Released	
30 June 2024	LB	(Portugal) Yuri Ribeiro	Unattached	Released	
30 June 2024	LB	(Portugal) Gil Dias	(Germany) VfB Stuttgart	End of loan	
30 June 2024	CM	(Kosovo) Qëndrim Zyba	(Kosovo) FC Ballkani	End of loan	
30 June 2024	DM	(Poland) Filip Rejczyk	(Poland) Śląsk Wrocław	End of contract	
30 June 2024	GK	(Poland) Cezary Miszta	(Portugal) Rio Ave F.C.	€1.00M	
17 July 2024	GK	(Poland) Dominik Hładun	(Poland) Zagłębie Lubin		
24 July 2024	LW	(Germany) Makana Baku	(Greece) Atromitos F.C.		
25 July 2024	CF	(Poland) Maciej Rosołek	(Poland) Piast Gliwice		
13 September 2024	CF	(Slovenia) Blaž Kramer	(Turkey) Konyaspor	€0.70M	
12 January 2025	DM	(Albania) Jurgen Çelhaka	(Slovenia) NK Olimpija Ljubljana		
21 February 2025	RB	(Russia) Ramil Mustafaev	(Poland) Cracovia II	Released	

=== Loaned in ===
Date	Position	Player	From	Date until	Ref
16 June 2024	AM	(Brazil) Luquinhas	(Brazil) Fortaleza Esporte Clube	End of season	
18 June 2024	CF	(Cameroon) Jean-Pierre Nsame	(Italy) Como 1907	End of season (ended on 30 Jan 2025)	
3 July 2024	LB	(Portugal) Rúben Vinagre	(Portugal) Sporting CP	End of season (ended on 6 February 2025)	
6 February 2025	GK	(Bosnia and Herzegovina) Vladan Kovačević	(Portugal) Sporting CP	End of season	

=== Loaned out ===
Date	Position	Player	To	Date until	Ref
30 June 2024	GK	(Poland) Maciej Kikolski	(Poland) Radomiak Radom	End of season	
17 July 2024	AM	(Poland) Bartłomiej Ciepiela	(Poland) Znicz Pruszków	End of season	
21 August 2024	CM	(Poland) Igor Strzałek	(Poland) Bruk-Bet Termalica Nieciecza	End of season	
15 January 2025	CB	(Switzerland) Marco Burch	(Poland) Radomiak Radom	End of season	
22 January 2025	CF	(France) Migouel Alfarela	(Greece) Athens Kallithea F.C.	End of season	
28 January 2025	CM	(Poland) Jakub Adkonis	(Poland) Ruch Chorzów	End of season	
5 February 2025	CF	(Poland) Jordan Majchrzak	(Poland) Arka Gdynia	End of season	

=== Overall transfer activity ===
==== Expenditure ====
Summer: €2.76M

Winter: €4.05M

Total: €6.81M

==== Income ====
Summer: €1.70M

Winter: €0

Total: €1.70M

==== Net totals ====
Summer: -€1.06M

Winter: -€4.05M

Total: -€5.11M

== Pre-season and friendlies ==
Win Draw Loss Fixtures

=== Pre-season friendlies ===
21 June 2024 Friendly	Legia Warsaw	2–1	Odra Opole	Książenice, Poland
13:00 CEST	Baku 62'; Luquinhas 66'	Report	Tested player 30'	Stadium: Legia Training Center

24 June 2024 Friendly	Legia Warsaw	0–1	Universitatea Craiova	Jenbach, Austria
18:00 CEST		Report	Căpățînă 63'

27 June 2024 Friendly	Legia Warsaw	6–0	FC Botoșani	Kössen, Austria
17:30 CEST	Gual 60'; Urbański 65'; Pekhart 85'; Rosołek 103'; Majchrzak 117' 120'	Report

30 June 2024 Friendly	Legia Warsaw	0–1	Pafos FC	Saalfelden, Austria
18:00 CEST		Report	Jairo 30'

6 July 2024 Friendly	Legia Warsaw	2–0	Jagiellonia Białystok	Książenice, Polska
11:00 CEST	Gual 30'; Nsame 46'	Report		Stadium: Legia Training Center; Referee: Maciej Lewicki

6 July 2024 Friendly	Legia Warsaw	1–1	Lechia Gdańsk	Książenice, Polska
13:00 CEST	Majchrzak 55'	Report	Mena 18'	Stadium: Legia Training Center

12 July 2024 Friendly	Legia Warsaw	2–1	Widzew Łódź	Książenice, Polska
11:30 CEST	Gual 67'; Kapuadi 82'	Report	Cybulski 42'	Stadium: Legia Training Center

=== Mid-season friendlies ===
11 January 2025 Friendly	Legia Warsaw	2–2	CFR Cluj	Oliva, Spain
15:45 CEST	Morishita 4'; Szczepaniak 90'	Report	Tachtsidis 7'; Tachtsidis 44'	Stadium: Oliva Nova Sports Center; Attendance: 50; Referee: Jorge Tárraga

18 January 2025 Friendly	Legia Warsaw	0–0	Piast Gliwice	Oliva, Spain
15:30 CEST		Report		Stadium: Oliva Nova Sports Center; Attendance: 50

19 January 2025 Friendly	Legia Warsaw	2–1	Stal Mielec	Oliva, Spain
11:30 CEST	Ziółkowski 21'; Wszołek 80'	Report	Esselink 67'	Stadium: Oliva Nova Sports Center; Attendance: 40

25 January 2025 Friendly	Legia Warsaw	6–3	Górnik Łęczna	Książenice, Poland
13:00 CEST	Kapustka 12'; Augustyniak 56' 90'; Gonçalves 80'; Urbański 109'; Pekhart 131'	Report	Orlik 67'; Janaszek 43'; Litwa 98'	Stadium: Legia Training Center; Attendance: 0 Referee: Tomasz Kwiatkowski

== Competitions ==
=== Overview ===
Competition	First match	Last match	Starting round	Final position	Record							
Competition	First match	Last match	Starting round	Final position	Pld	W	D	L	GF	GA	GD	Win %
Ekstraklasa	20 Jul 2024	25 May 2025	Matchday 1	Fifth place	34	15	9	10	60	45	+15	44.12
Polish Cup	31 Oct 2024	2 May 2025	Round of 32	Final	5	5	0	0	17	5	+12	100.00
UEFA Conference League	25 Jul 2024	17 Apr 2025	Second qualifying round	Quarter-finals	16	11	1	4	37	15	+22	68.75
Total					55	31	10	14	114	65	+49	56.36

Last updated: 25 May 2025
Source: Soccerway

=== Ekstraklasa ===
==== League table ====
Pos	Team	Pld	W	D	L	GF	GA	GD	Pts	Qualification or relegation
3	Jagiellonia Białystok	34	17	10	7	56	42	+14	61	Qualification for Conference League second qualifying round
4	Pogoń Szczecin	34	17	7	10	59	40	+19	58	
5	Legia Warsaw	34	15	9	10	60	45	+15	54	Qualification for Europa League first qualifying round (Note: The 2024–25 Polish Cup winners (Legia Warsaw) qualify for the Europa League first qualifying round.)
6	Cracovia	34	14	9	11	58	53	+5	51	
7	Motor Lublin	34	14	7	13	48	59	−11	49 (Note: Ranked based on head-to-head points: Motor Lublin 4 pts, GKS Katowice - 1 pt.)	

Source: ekstraklasa.org 90minut.pl
Rules for classification: 1) Points; 2) Head-to-head points; 3) Head-to-head goal difference; 4) Goal difference; 5) Goals scored; 6) Number of wins; 7) Number of away wins; 8) Lower number of points based on yellow and red cards (red card = 3 points, yellow card = 1 point, sending-off = 3 points - including 1 point for first yellow card); 9) Fairplay ranking; 10) Draw.
(Note: Head-to-head record is used only after all the matches between the teams in question have been played)

==== Results summary ====
Overall								Home						Away					
Pld	W	D	L	GF	GA	GD	Pts	W	D	L	GF	GA	GD	W	D	L	GF	GA	GD
34	15	9	10	60	45	+15	54	9	4	4	32	18	+14	6	5	6	28	27	+1

Last updated: 25 May 2025.

==== Results by round ====
Round	1	2	3	4	5	6	7	8	9	10	11	12	13	14	15	16	17	18	19	20	21	22	23	24	25	26	27	28	29	30	31	32	33	34
Ground	H	A	H	A	H	A	H	H	A	H	A	A	H	H	A	H	A	A	H	A	H	A	H	A	A	H	A	H	H	A	H	A	A	H
Result	W	W	L	D	W	D	W	L	L	D	D	W	W	W	L	W	D	W	D	L	W	L	W	D	L	D	W	L	W	W	L	W	L	D
Position	3	2	5	6	1	3	2	4	8	7	6	5	5	5	5	5	5	4	4	4	4	5	4	4	5	5	5	5	5	5	5	5	5	5
Points	3	6	6	7	10	11	14	14	14	15	16	19	22	25	25	28	29	32	33	33	36	36	39	40	40	41	44	44	47	50	50	53	53	54

Updated to match(es) played on 25 May 2025. Source: PKO Ekstraklasa
A = Away; H = Home; W = Win; D = Draw; L = Loss

==== Matches ====
The league fixtures were announced on 6 June 2024.

20 July 2024 1	Legia Warsaw	2–0	Zagłębie Lubin	Warsaw
20:15 CEST	Augustyniak 86'; Luquinhas 90'	Report		Stadium: Polish Army Stadium; Attendance: 25,542; Referee: Piotr Lasyk

28 July 2024 2	Korona Kielce	0–1	Legia Warsaw	Kielce
20:15 CEST	Luquinhas 74'	Report		Stadium: Arena Kielce; Attendance: 14,229; Referee: Karol Arys

4 August 2024 3	Legia Warsaw	1–2	Piast Gliwice	Warsaw
20:15 CEST	Kramer 45'	Report	Chrapek 20'; Kostadinov 85'	Stadium: Polish Army Stadium; Attendance: 24,633; Referee: Łukasz Kuźma

11 August 2024 4	Puszcza Niepołomice	2–2	Legia Warsaw	Kraków
17:30 CEST	Crăciun 17'; Blagaić 41'	Report	Morishita 14'; Kramer 22'	Stadium: Józef Piłsudski Cracovia Stadium; Attendance: 3,495; Referee: Paweł Malec

18 August 2024 5	Legia Warsaw	4–1	Radomiak Radom	Warsaw
CEST	Kramer 39' (pen.); Kapustka 45+4'; Gual 71' (pen.); Urbański 90'	Report	Capita 62'	Stadium: Polish Army Stadium; Attendance: 24,376; Referee: Damian Sylwestrzak

25 August 2024 6	Śląsk Wrocław	1–1	Legia Warsaw	Wrocław
20:15 CEST	Guercio 66'	Report	Kapustka 53'	Stadium: Wrocław Stadium; Attendance: 36,208; Referee: Szymon Marciniak

1 September 2024 7	Legia Warsaw	5–2	Motor Lublin	Warsaw
14:45 CEST	Kapustka 30', 69'; Wszołek 36' (pen.); Alfarela 48'; Nsame 90+1'	Report	Rudol 9'; Ndiaye 90'	Stadium: Polish Army Stadium; Attendance: 27,142; Referee: Damian Kos

15 September 2024 8	Legia Warsaw	0–1	Raków Częstochowa	Warsaw
17:30 CEST		Report	Carlos 41'	Stadium: Polish Army Stadium; Attendance: 26,102; Referee: Jarosław Przybył

20 September 2024 9	Pogoń Szczecin	1–0	Legia Warsaw	Szczecin
20:30 CEST		Report	Gorgon 67'	Stadium: Florian Krygier Stadium; Attendance: 20,415; Referee: Wojciech Myć

28 September 2024 10	Legia Warsaw	1–1	Górnik Zabrze	Warsaw
20:15 CEST	Pankov 35'	Report	Lukoszek 10'	Stadium: Polish Army Stadium; Attendance: 24,438

6 October 2024 11	Jagiellonia Białystok	1–1	Legia Warsaw	Białystok
20:15 CEST	Imaz 35'	Report	Gual 67'	Stadium: Chorten Arena; Attendance: 20,029; Referee: Szymon Marciniak

18 October 2024 12	Lechia Gdańsk	0–2	Legia Warsaw	Gdańsk
20:30 CEST		Report	Morishita 58'; Chodyna 63'	Stadium: Gdańsk Stadium; Attendance: 25,000; Referee: Piotr Lasyk

27 October 2024 13	Legia Warsaw	4–1	GKS Katowice	Warsaw
20:15 CEST	Kapuadi 28'; Chodyna 45+1'; Jędrych 60' (o.g.); Augustyniak 65'	Report	Zreľák 25'	Stadium: Polish Army Stadium; Attendance: 25,188; Referee: Karol Arys

3 November 2024 14	Legia Warsaw	2–1	Widzew Łódź	Warsaw
CET	Kapustka 37'; Wszołek 88'	Report	Kerk 41'	Stadium: Polish Army Stadium; Attendance: 26,236; Referee: Damian Sylwestrzak

10 November 2024 15	Lech Poznań	5–2	Legia Warsaw	Poznań
17:30 CET	Gholizadeh 5'; Kozubal 39'; Sousa 50', 69'; Ishak 59'	Report	Gual 29'; Augustyniak 45+2'	Stadium: Poznań Stadium; Attendance: 40,838; Referee: Szymon Marciniak

23 November 2024 16	Legia Warsaw	3–2	Cracovia	Warsaw
20:15 CET	Kapustka 17'; Gual 26'; Urbański 39'	Report	Källman 34'; Maigaard 79'	Stadium: Polish Army Stadium; Attendance: 25,121; Referee: Piotr Lasyk

30 November 2024 17	Stal Mielec	2–2	Legia Warsaw	Mielec
CET	Wlazło 28'; Wolsztyński 90+1'	Report	Morishita 12'; Augustyniak 63'	Stadium: Mielec Stadium; Attendance: 6,337; Referee: Karol Arys

8 December 2024 18	Zagłębie Lubin	0–3	Legia Warsaw	Lubin
17:30 CET		Report	Barcia 17'; Kapustka 26' (pen.); Morishita 31'	Stadium: Lubin Stadium; Attendance: 7,859; Referee: Wojciech Myć

2 February 2025 19	Legia Warsaw	1–1	Korona Kielce	Warsaw
17:30 CET	Kapuadi 40'	Report	Dalmau 22'	Stadium: Polish Army Stadium; Attendance: 24,169; Referee: Jarosław Przybył

8 February 2025 20	Piast Gliwice	1–0	Legia Warsaw	Gliwice
20:15 CET	Felix 40'	Report		Stadium: Piotr Wieczorek Municipal Stadium; Attendance: 8,304; Referee: Szymon Marciniak

15 February 2025 21	Legia Warsaw	2–0	Puszcza Niepołomice	Warsaw
20:15 CET	Kapustka 15'; Kapuadi 35'	Report		Stadium: Polish Army Stadium; Attendance: 18,406; Referee: Wojciech Myć

22 February 2025 22	Radomiak Radom	3–1	Legia Warsaw	Radom
20:15 CET	Materazzi 19'; Grzesik 42'; Capita 54'	Report	Kapustka 6'	Stadium: Czachor Brothers Stadium; Attendance: 8,227; Referee: Łukasz Kuźma

2 March 2025 23	Legia Warsaw	3–1	Śląsk Wrocław	Warsaw
14:45 CET	Gual 35'; Vinagre 49'; Urbański 87'	Report	Al Hamlawi 36'	Stadium: Polish Army Stadium; Attendance: 24,089; Referee: Damian Kos

10 March 2025 24	Motor Lublin	3–3	Legia Warsaw	Lublin
14:45 CET	van Hoeven 37'; Mraz 65' 90+10'	Report	Gual 11'; Chodyna 55'; Morishita 71'	Stadium: Arena Lublin; Attendance: 15,200; Referee: Jarosław Przybył

16 March 2025 25	Raków Częstochowa	3–2	Legia Warsaw	Częstochowa
17:30 CET	Svarnas 10'; Braut Brunes 32'; Amorim 47'	Report	Gual 50'; Luquinhas 85'	Stadium: Miejski Stadion Piłkarski Raków; Attendance: 5,500; Referee: Wojciech Myć

28 March 2025 26	Legia Warsaw	0–0	Pogoń Szczecin	Warsaw
20:30 CET		Report		Stadium: Polish Army Stadium; Attendance: 27,424; Referee: Wojciech Myć

6 April 2025 27	Górnik Zabrze	1–2	Legia Warsaw	Zabrze
14:45 CET	Ismaheel 8'	Report	Luquinhas 58', 67'	Stadium: Arena Zabrze; Attendance: 23,438; Referee: Szymon Marciniak

13 April 2025 28	Legia Warsaw	0–1	Jagiellonia Białystok	Warsaw
20:15 CET		Report	Čurlinov 41'	Stadium: Polish Army Stadium; Attendance: 25,347; Referee: Damian Sylwestrzak

21 April 2025 29	Legia Warsaw	2–1	Lechia Gdańsk	Warsaw
17:30 CET	Materazzi 19'	Report	Luquinhas 45+2'; Ziółkowski 90+5'	Stadium: Polish Army Stadium; Attendance: 21,841; Referee: Patryk Gryckiewicz

26 April 2025 30	GKS Katowice	0–3	Legia Warsaw	Katowice
20:15 CET	Szymczak 63'	Report	Goncalves 15'; Shkurin 18'; Gual 90+3'	Stadium: Arena Katowice; Attendance: 14,611; Referee: Karol Arys

11 May 2025 32	Legia Warsaw	0–1	Lech Poznań	Warsaw
17:30 CET		Report	Gholizadeh 77'	Stadium: Polish Army Stadium; Attendance: 27,341; Referee: Marcin Kochanek

18 May 2025 33	KS Cracovia	3–1	Legia Warsaw	Kraków
14:45 CET	Rózga 19'; Källman 55'; Henriksson 69'	Report	Shkurin 21'	Stadium: Józef Piłsudski Cracovia Stadium; Attendance: 13,709; Referee: Damian Sylwestrzak

15 May 2025 31	Widzew Łódź	0–2	Legia Warsaw	Łódź
20:30 CET		Report	Morishita 17'; Gual 34'	Stadium: Widzew Łódź Stadium; Attendance: 17,492; Referee: Piotr Lasyk

24 May 2025 34	Legia Warsaw	2–2	Stal Mielec	Warsaw
17:30 CET	Pekhart 64'; Wszołek 79'	Report	Wolsztyński 57'; Matras 77'	Stadium: Polish Army Stadium; Attendance: 25,344; Referee: Marcin Kochanek

=== Polish Cup ===
31 October 2024 Round of 32	Miedź Legnica	1–2	Legia Warsaw	Legnica
20:30 CET	Letniowski 49'	Report	Kapustka 57'; Luquinhas 77'	Stadium: White Eagle Municipal Stadium; Attendance: 4,922; Referee: Jarosław Przybył

5 December 2024 Round of 16	ŁKS Łódź	0–3	Legia Warsaw	Łódź
18:00 CET		Report	Gual 49'; Dankowski 57' (o.g.); Gual 62'	Stadium: Władysław Król Municipal Stadium; Attendance: 8,951; Referee: Łukasz Kuźma

26 February 2025 Quarter-finals	Legia Warsaw	3–1	Jagiellonia Białystok	Warsaw
21:00 CET	Ziółkowski 53'; Morishita 85' 90+9'	Report	Kubicki 30'	Stadium: Polish Army Stadium; Attendance: 23,816; Referee: Piotr Lasyk

2 April 2025 Semi-finals	Ruch Chorzów	0–5	Legia Warsaw	Chorzów
18:00 CET		Report	Chodyna 5'; Gual 28'; Wszołek 56'; Morishita 79'; Shkurin 84'	Stadium: Silesian Stadium; Attendance: 25,496; Referee: Damian Sylwestrzak

2 May 2025 Final	Pogoń Szczecin	3–4	Legia Warsaw	Warsaw
16:00 CET	Lončar 40'; Koulouris 67'; Smoliński 90+5'	Report	Luquinhas 13'; Morishita 46'; Shkurin 64'; Vinagre 85'	Stadium: National Stadium; Attendance: 51,233; Referee: Szymon Marciniak

=== UEFA Conference League ===
==== Second qualifying round ====
25 July 2024 First leg	Legia Warsaw (Poland)	6–0	(Wales) Caernarfon Town	Warsaw, Poland
20:45 CEST	Gual 22'; McMullan 44' (o.g.); Gual 48'; Gual 53'; Kramer 71'; Gonçalves 90'	Report		Stadium: Polish Army Stadium; Attendance: 0 Referee: Juri Frischer

1 August 2024 Second leg	Caernarfon Town (Wales)	0–5 (0–11 agg.)	(Poland) Legia Warsaw	Bangor, Wales
20:45 CEST		Report	Kapustka 46'; Jędrzejczyk 48'; Pekhart 54'; Nsame 72'; Barcia 83'	Stadium: Nantporth; Attendance: 863; Referee: Ivar Orri Kristjansson

==== Third qualifying round ====
8 August 2024 First leg	Brøndby IF (Denmark)	2–3	(Poland) Legia Warsaw	Brøndbyvester, Denmark
19:00 CEST	Bundgaard 19'; Kvistgaarden 36'	Report	Pekhart 24'; Luquinhas 70'; Pekhart 86'	Stadium: Brøndby Stadium; Attendance: 19,502; Referee: Martin Dohál

15 August 2024 Second leg	Legia Warsaw (Poland)	1–1 (4–3 agg.)	(Denmark) Brøndby IF	Warsaw, Poland
18:00 CEST	Pankov 48'	Report	Wass 38'	Stadium: Stadion Wojska Polskiego; Attendance: 26,823; Referee: Chryssovalántis Theoulí

==== Fourth qualifying round ====
22 August 2024 First leg	Legia Warsaw (Poland)	2–0	FC Drita (Kosovo)	Warsaw, Poland
18:00 CEST	Kramer 56'; Gual 83'	Report	Gonda (red card) 30'	Stadium: Stadion Wojska Polskiego; Attendance: 19,316; Referee: Chris Kavanagh

29 August 2024 Second leg	FC Drita (Kosovo)	0–1 (0–3 agg.)	(Poland) Legia Warsaw	Pristina, Kosovo
20:00 CEST	Pekhart 90+1'	Report		Stadium: Fadil Vokrri Stadium; Attendance: 6,000; Referee: Daniel Schlager

==== League phase ====
The league phase draw was held on 30 August 2024.

===== Table =====
Pos	Team	Pld	W	D	L	GF	GA	GD	Pts	Qualification
5	(Sweden) Djurgårdens IF	6	4	1	1	11	7	+4	13 (Note: Away goals scored: Djurgårdens IF 5, Lugano 4.)	Advance to round of 16 (seeded)
6	(Switzerland) Lugano	6	4	1	1	11	7	+4	13	Advance to round of 16 (seeded)
7	(Poland) Legia Warsaw	6	4	0	2	13	5	+8	12	Advance to round of 16 (seeded)
8	(Belgium) Cercle Brugge	6	3	2	1	14	7	+7	11	Advance to round of 16 (seeded)
9	(Poland) Jagiellonia Białystok	6	3	2	1	10	5	+5	11	Advance to knockout phase play-offs (seeded)

Source: UEFA
Rules for classification: League phase tiebreakers

===== Result by round =====
Round	1	2	3	4	5	6
Ground	H	A	H	A	H	A
Result	W	W	W	W	L	L
Position	15	3	2	2	4	7
Points	3	6	9	12	12	12

Updated to match(es) played on 20 Dec 2024. Source: UEFA
A = Away; H = Home; W = Win; D = Draw; L = Loss

Win Draw Loss Fixtures

===== Matches =====
3 October 2024	Legia Warsaw (Poland)	1–0	(Spain) Real Betis	Warsaw, Poland
18:45 CEST	Kapuadi 23'	Report		Stadium: Stadion Wojska Polskiego; Attendance: 25,385; Referee: Luca Pairetto

24 October 2024	FK TSC (Serbia)	0–3	(Poland) Legia Warsaw	Bačka Topola, Serbia
21:00 CEST		Report	Kapustka 11'; Luquinhas 47'; Chodyna 62'	Stadium: TSC Arena; Attendance: 5,000; Referee: Julian Weinberger

7 November 2024	Legia Warsaw (Poland)	4–0	(Belarus) FC Dinamo Minsk	Warsaw, Poland
18:45 CEST	Luquinhas 10'; Gual 51' (pen.); Luquinhas 55'; Gual 59'	Report		Stadium: Stadion Wojska Polskiego; Attendance: 22,723; Referee: Atilla Karaoğlan

28 November 2024	AC Omonia (Cyprus)	0–3	(Poland) Legia Warsaw	Strovolos, Cyprus
21:00 CEST		Report	Morishita 17'; Szczepaniak 77'; Wszołek 86'	Stadium: GSP Stadium; Referee: Radoslav Gidzhenov

12 December 2024	Legia Warsaw (Poland)	1–2	(Switzerland) FC Lugano	Warsaw, Poland
18:45 CEST	Morishita 11'	Report	Bottani 40'; Hajdari 74'	Stadium: Stadion Wojska Polskiego; Attendance: 21,767; Referee: Juan Martínez Munuera

19 December 2024	Djurgården (Sweden)	3–1	(Poland) Legia Warsaw	Stockholm, Sweden
21:00 CEST	Nguen 24'; Hümmet 45+3'; Aslund 76'	Report	Wszołek 57'	Stadium: Tele2 Arena; Attendance: 23,270; Referee: David Šmajc

==== Knockout phase ====
===== Round of 16 =====
The round of 16 draw was held on 21 February 2025.

6 March 2025 First leg	Molde FK (Norway)	3–2	(Poland) Legia Warsaw	Molde, Norway
18:45 CEST	Hestad 11'; Eriksen 17'; Gulbrandsen 43'	Report	Chodyna 64'; Luquinhas 67'	Stadium: Aker Stadion; Attendance: 4,098; Referee: Horațiu Feșnic

13 March 2025 Second leg	Legia Warsaw (Poland)	2–0 (a.e.t.) (4–3 agg.)	(Norway) Molde FK	Warsaw, Poland
21:00 CEST	Morishita 34'; Gual 108'	Report		Stadium: Stadion Wojska Polskiego; Attendance: 26,153; Referee: Matej Jug

===== Quarter-finals =====
The quarter-finals draw was held on 21 February 2025, after the round of 16 draw. The order of legs was reversed in order to avoid a scheduling conflict with the Europa League's Tottenham Hotspur v Eintracht Frankfurt match in London.

10 April 2025 First leg	Legia Warsaw (Poland)	0–3	(England) Chelsea	Warsaw, Poland
18:45 CEST		Report	George 49'; Madueke 57', 74'; Nkunku (penalty missed) 73'	Stadium: Polish Army Stadium; Attendance: 29,055; Referee: Serdar Gözübüyük (Netherlands)

17 April 2025 Second leg	Chelsea (England)	1–2 (4–2 agg.)	(Poland) Legia Warsaw	London, England
20:00	Cucurella 33'	Report	Pekhart 10' (pen.); Kapuadi 53'	Stadium: Stamford Bridge; Attendance: 29,027; Referee: Alejandro Hernández Hernández (Spain)

== Statistics ==
=== Goalscorers ===
Rank	Number	Position	Nation	Name	Ekstraklasa	Polish Cup	UEFA Conference League	Total	Career club total
1	28	CF	(Spain)	Marc Gual	9	3	7	19	30
2	25	RW	(Japan)	Ryōya Morishita	6	4	4	14	14
3	82	AM	(Brazil)	Luquinhas	6	2	5	13	25
4	67	CM	(Poland)	Bartosz Kapustka	9	1	2	12	21
5	11	RW	(Poland)	Kacper Chodyna	3	1	2	6	6
6	3	CB	(France)	Steve Kapuadi	3	0	2	6	6
7	13	RW	(Poland)	Paweł Wszołek	3	1	2	6	37
8	9	CF	(Slovenia)	Blaž Kramer	3	0	2	5	17
9	7	CF	(Czech Republic)	Tomáš Pekhart	1	0	4	5	63
10	8	CB	(Poland)	Rafał Augustyniak	4	0	0	4	10
11	17	CG	(Belarus)	Illia Shkuryn	2	2	0	4	4
12	53	AM	(Poland)	Wojciech Urbański	3	0	0	3	3
13	77	CF	(Cameroon)	Jean-Pierre Nsame	1	0	1	2	2
14	12	CB	(Serbia)	Radovan Pankov	1	0	1	2	4
15	42	CB	(Poland)	Sergio Barcia	1	0	1	2	2
16	24	CB	(Poland)	Jan Ziółkowski	1	1	0	2	2
17	5	DM	(Portugal)	Claude Gonçalves	1	0	1	2	2
18	55	CB	(Poland)	Artur Jędrzejczyk	0	0	1	1	10
19	17	CF	(France)	Migouel Alfarela	1	0	0	1	1
20	71	RW	(Poland)	Mateusz Szczepaniak	0	0	1	1	1
21	19	LB	(Portugal)	Rúben Vinagre	1	1	0	2	2
Own goals					1	1	1	3	
TOTALS					60	17	37	114	

Last updated: 25 May 2025.
Source: FBref.com

==== Hat-tricks ====
Includes all competitions for senior teams. Players with no hat-tricks not included in the list.

Keys

- Score – The score at the time of each goal. Legia's score listed first.
- Final score – The score at full time; Legia's listed first.

Date	No.	Pos.	Player	Score	Final score	Opponent	Competition	Ref.
25 Jul 2024	28	CF	(Spain) Marc Gual	1–0, 3–0, 4–0 (A)	6–0 (A)	Caernarfon Town F.C.	UEFA Conference League	

=== Assists ===
Place	Number	Position	Nation	Name	Ekstraklasa	Polish Cup	UEFA Conference League	Total
1	25	RW	(Japan)	Ryōya Morishita	4	3	6	13
2	19	LB	(Portugal)	Rúben Vinagre	5	0	5	10
3	13	CB	(Poland)	Paweł Wszołek	3	2	4	9
4	28	CF	(Spain)	Marc Gual	4	0	2	6
5	11	RW	(Poland)	Kacper Chodyna	3	1	1	5
6	82	AM	(Brazil)	Luquinhas	4	0	1	5
7	9	CF	(Slovenia)	Blaž Kramer	1	0	3	4
8	67	CM	(Poland)	Bartosz Kapustka	1	1	1	3
9	8	CB	(Poland)	Rafał Augustyniak	2	0	1	3
10	17	CF	(France)	Migouel Alfarela	2	0	0	2
11	24	CB	(Poland)	Jan Ziółkowski	2	0	0	2
12	17	CF	(Belarus)	Illia Shkuryn	2	0	0	2
13	5	DM	(Portugal)	Claude Gonçalves	0	0	2	2
14	12	CB	(Serbia)	Radovan Pankov	0	2	0	2
15	22	CM	(Colombia)	Juergen Elitim	2	0	0	2
16	3	CB	(France)	Steve Kapuadi	0	0	1	1
17	71	AM	(Poland)	Mateusz Szczepaniak	0	0	1	1
18	53	AM	(Poland)	Wojciech Urbański	0	0	1	1
19	16	DM	(Albania)	Jurgen Çelhaka	1	0	0	1
20	53	AM	(Poland)	Wojciech Urbański	1	0	0	1
21	6	DM	(Poland)	Maxi Oyedele	0	0	1	1
22	21	RW	(Armenia)	Vahan Bichakhchyan	1	0	0	1
TOTALS					37	9	25	67

Last updated: 25 May 2025.
Source: FBref.com

=== Pro Junior System ===
The Pro Junior System is a program aimed at promoting the participation of young Polish footballers in the top Polish leagues. Clubs earn points based on the amount of time players under the age of 23 spend on the pitch. In the 2024–25 season, this includes players born in 2004 or later. For a player's minutes to count towards the ranking, they must appear in at least 5 matches and spend a total of at least 270 minutes on the field. Points earned by club-trained players are counted double. At the end of the season, the total points accumulated by each club are calculated, and the 7 clubs with the highest scores receive prizes ranging from 3.25 to 0.25 million PLN. Clubs that score fewer than 3,000 points in the ranking will face penalties ranging from 3 to 0.5 million PLN.

Round	Jordan Majchrzak	Oliwier Olewiński	Maxi Oyedele	Igor Strzałek	Mateusz Szczepaniak	Wojciech Urbański	Jan Ziółkowski	Total
1.	0	–	–	12	0	–	65	77
2.	–	–	–	8	–	–	90	98
3.	–	–	–	–	–	–	90	90
4.	–	–	–	–	–	–	66	66
5.	–	–	–	–	–	11	–	10
6.	–	–	–	–	–	0	0	0
7.	–	–	–	–	–	0	90	90
8.	–	–	–	–	–	–	0	0
9.	–	–	22	–	–	10	0	32
10.	–	–	78	–	–	12	0	90
11.	–	–	86	–	–	4	0	90
12.	–	–	45	–	–	54	0	99
13.	–	–	0	–	–	78	0	78
14.	–	–	–	–	1	24	0	25
15.	–	–	–	–	14	27	8	49
16.	–	–	–	–	0	58	32	90
17.	–	–	–	–	13	57	0	70
18.	0	–	–	–	12	–	28	40
19.	1	–	13	–	0	45	0	59
20.	–	0	24	–	11	–	23	58
21.	–	6	85	–	–	27	90	208
22.	–	–	45	–	–	0	90	135
23.	–	–	76	–	–	14	–	90
24.	–	–	0	–	–	–	90	90
25.	–	–	0	–	–	3	0	3
26.	–	–	0	–	–	27	0	27
27.	–	–	15	–	–	4	90	109
28.	–	–	90	–	0	14	90	194
29.	–	–	90	–	8	20	90	208
30.	–	–	78	–	–	–	71	149
31.	–			–				
32.	–			–				
33.	–			–				
34.	–			–				
Games	1	1	13	2	6	18	16	–
Minutes	1	5	747	20	59	489	1103	2425
Points	0	0	747	0	0	489	1103	2339

Last updated: 27 Apr 2025.
Source: laczynaspilka.pl

=== Home attendances ===
Matches played behind closed doors for which tickets could not be sold are not counted.

	Matches	Total attendances	%	Average attendance	Highest attendance	%	Lowest attendance	%
Ekstraklasa	17	423,459	80,3%	24,909	27,424	88,4%	18,406	59,4%
Polish Cup	1	23,816	76,8%	23,816	23,816	76,8%	23,816	76,8%
UEFA Conference League	7	171,222	78,9%	24,460	29,055	93,7%	19,316	62,3%
All	25	618,497	79,8%	25,771	29,055	93,7%	18,406	59,4%

Last updated: 25 May 2025.
Source: legionisci.com

== Awards ==
=== Ekstraklasa Player of the Month ===
Month	Player	Ref.
August	(Poland) Bartosz Kapustka	

=== Ekstraklasa Young Player of the Month ===
Month	Player	Ref.
July	(Poland) Jan Ziółkowski	

== Milestones ==
=== Games ===
The following players made their competitive debuts for Legia's first team during the season.

Date	No.	Pos.	Player	Age	Final score	Opponent	Competition
20 Jul 2024	5	DF	(Portugal) Claude Gonçalves	30	2–0 (A)	Zagłębie Lubin	Ekstraklasa
20 Jul 2024	19	LB	(Portugal) Rúben Vinagre	25	2–0 (A)	Zagłębie Lubin	Ekstraklasa
25 Jul 2024	11	RB	(Poland) Kacper Chodyna	25	6–0 (H)	Caernarfon Town	Conference League
25 Jul 2024	99	CF	(Poland) Jordan Majchrzak	19	6–0 (H)	Caernarfon Town	Conference League
25 Jul 2024	71	RW	(Poland) Mateusz Szczepaniak	17	6–0 (H)	Caernarfon Town	Conference League
1 Aug 2024	77	CF	(Cameroon) Jean-Pierre Nsame	31	0–5 (A)	Caernarfon Town	Conference League
1 Aug 2024	42	CB	(Spain) Sergio Barcia	23	0–5 (A)	Caernarfon Town	Conference League
1 Aug 2024	23	GK	(Poland) Gabriel Kobylak	20	0–5 (A)	Caernarfon Town	Conference League
1 Aug 2024	20	AM	(Poland) Jakub Żewłakow	17	0–5 (A)	Caernarfon Town	Conference League
1 Aug 2024	80	DM	(Poland) Jakub Adkonis	17	0–5 (A)	Caernarfon Town	Conference League
4 Aug 2024	17	CF	(France) Migouel Alfarela	27	1–2 (H)	Piast Gliwice	Ekstraklasa
20 Aug 2024	6	DM	(Poland) Maxi Oyedele	19	1–0 (A)	Pogoń Szczecin	Ekstraklasa
2 Feb 2025	21	RW	(Armenia) Vahan Bichakhchyan	25	1–1 (H)	Korona Kielce	Ekstraklasa
8 Feb 2025	77	GK	(Bosnia and Herzegovina) Vladan Kovačević	26	1–0 (A)	Piast Gliwice	Ekstraklasa
15 Feb 2025	52	RB	(Poland) Oliwier Olewiński	19	2–0 (H)	Puszcza Niepołomice	Ekstraklasa
22 Feb 2025	17	CF	(Belarus) Illia Shkuryn	25	3–1 (A)	Radomiak Radom	Ekstraklasa
18 May 2025	51	DM	(Poland) Pascal Mozie	17	3–1 (A)	KS Cracovia	Ekstraklasa
24 May 2025	70	DM	(Poland) Aleksander Wyganowski	15	2–2 (H)	Stal Mielec	Ekstraklasa
100th appearances
6 Apr 2025	8	DM	(Poland) Rafał Augustyniak	31	1–2 (A)	Górnik Zabrze	Ekstraklasa
200th appearances
16 Mar 2025	13	RW	(Poland) Paweł Wszołek	32	3–2 (A)	Raków Częstochowa	Ekstraklasa
400th appearances
17 Apr 2025	55	CB	(Poland) Artur Jędrzejczyk	37	1–2 (A)	Chelsea F.C.	Conference League
