= Mateusz Szczepaniak =

Mateusz Szczepaniak may refer to:

- Mateusz Szczepaniak (footballer, born 1991), Polish football forward
- Mateusz Szczepaniak (speedway rider) (born 1987), Polish speedway rider
- Mateusz Szczepaniak (footballer, born 2007), Polish football midfielder
