= Steve Kapuadi =

French footballer (born 1998)

Personal information
- Full name: Steve Nkanu Kapuadi
- Date of birth: 30 April 1998 (age 28)
- Place of birth: Le Mans, France
- Height: 1.96 m (6 ft 5 in)
- Position: Centre-back

Team information
- Current team: Widzew Łódź
- Number: 3

Youth career
- –2016: Zulte Waregem

Senior career*
Years	Team	Apps	(Gls)
2016–2019	Gent II		
2019	Inter Bratislava	10	(0)
2020−2022	Trenčín	22	(0)
2022−2023	Wisła Płock	26	(0)
2023–2026	Legia Warsaw	69	(4)
2024	Legia Warsaw II	1	(0)
2026–	Widzew Łódź	24	(4)

International career^{‡}
2025–	DR Congo	8	(0)
- * Club domestic league appearances and goals as of 13:22, 8 November 2026 (UTC) ‡ National team caps and goals as of 20:20, 5 October 2026 (UTC)

Steve Nkanu Kapuadi (born 30 April 1998) is a professional footballer who plays as a centre-back for Polish club Widzew Łódź. Born in France, he represents the DR Congo national team.

== Club career ==
After passing through the Le Mans training center up to U17 level, he left his hometown club for Angers, before joining the Zulte Waregem training center in Belgium. He then moved to La Gantoise, where he joined the club's reserve team. Kapuadi moved to AS Trenčín from partner club of Inter Bratislava during the winter of 2020. He made his professional Fortuna Liga debut for Trenčín during a home fixture, at their temporary home ground at pod Dubňom, against Zemplín Michalovce on 15 February 2020. He played the entire 90 minutes of the match as a centre back, along with another winter arrival Richard Križan. Trenčín went on to win 8–1. Kapuadi also made three further appearances in the remaining games of the regular season, becoming a regular in the starting eleven.

On 2 June 2022, Kapuadi was announced as Polish Ekstraklasa side Wisła Płock's new signing, penning a one-and-a-half-year deal, with an extension option until June 2025. On 22 August 2023, he moved to another Polish top division side Legia Warsaw.

On 25 February 2026, Kapuadi moved to league rivals Widzew Łódź on a deal until 2030, for a reported fee of €2 million plus €1 million in potential add-ons - the highest ever fee paid between two Polish clubs.

== International career ==
Kapuadi was born in France and is of Congolese descent.

On 8 May 2025, Kapuadi received his first call-up to the DR Congo national team for friendlies against Mali and Madagascar. He made his international debut against the latter in a 3–1 win on 8 June.

On 19 May 2026, he was included in the 26-man squad selected by head coach Sébastien Desabre to represent the DR Congo at the 2026 FIFA World Cup.

== Career statistics ==
=== Club ===
As of match played 7 November 2026

Appearances and goals by club, season and competition
Club	Season	League			National cup (Note: Includes Slovak Cup, Polish Cup)		Continental		Other		Total	
Club	Season	Division	Apps	Goals	Apps	Goals	Apps	Goals	Apps	Goals	Apps	Goals
Trenčín	2019–20	Slovak Super Liga	8	0	1	0	—		—		9	0
Trenčín	2020–21	Slovak Super Liga	14	0	2	0	—		—		16	0
Trenčín	Total		22	0	3	0	—		—		25	0
Wisła Płock	2022–23	Ekstraklasa	26	0	2	1	—		—		28	1
Legia Warsaw	2023–24	Ekstraklasa	23	1	2	0	6 (Note: Appearances in UEFA Conference League)	0	0	0	31	1
Legia Warsaw	2024–25	Ekstraklasa	30	3	4	0	13	2	—		47	5
Legia Warsaw	2025–26	Ekstraklasa	16	0	1	0	12 (Note: Six appearances in UEFA Europa League, six appearances in UEFA Conference League)	0	1 (Note: Appearance in Polish Super Cup)	0	30	0
Legia Warsaw	Total		69	4	7	0	31	2	1	0	108	6
Legia Warsaw II	2023–24	III liga, group I	1	0	0	0	—		—		1	0
Widzew Łódź	2025–26	Ekstraklasa	11	1	1	0	—		—		12	1
Widzew Łódź	2026–27	Ekstraklasa	13	3	1	0	—		—		14	3
Widzew Łódź	Total		24	4	2	0	—		—		26	4
Career total			142	8	14	1	31	2	1	0	188	11

=== International ===
As of match played 5 October 2026

Appearances and goals by national team and year
National team	Year	Apps	Goals
DR Congo	2025	2	0
DR Congo	2026	6	0
Total		8	0

== Honours ==
Legia Warsaw

- Polish Cup: 2024–25
- Polish Super Cup: 2025
