= Wojciech Urbański =

Polish footballer

Personal information
- Date of birth: 12 January 2005 (age 21)
- Place of birth: Limanowa, Poland
- Height: 1.84 m (6 ft 0 in)
- Position: Attacking midfielder

Team information
- Current team: Legia Warsaw
- Number: 53

Youth career
- 2014–2017: KS Tymbark
- 2017–2018: Turbacz Mszana Dolna
- 2018–2023: Wisła Kraków

Senior career*
Years	Team	Apps	(Gls)
2023–2025	Legia Warsaw II	18	(2)
2024–	Legia Warsaw	60	(4)

International career^{‡}
2018	Poland U14	1	(0)
2023	Poland U18	2	(0)
2023	Poland U19	2	(0)
2024–2025	Poland U20	5	(1)
2024–	Poland U21	7	(0)
- * Club domestic league appearances and goals as of 14:56, 10 November 2026 (UTC) ‡ National team caps and goals as of 21:26, 19 November 2026 (UTC)

Wojciech Urbański (born 12 January 2005) is a Polish professional footballer who plays as an attacking midfielder for Ekstraklasa club Legia Warsaw.

== Club career ==
=== Early career ===
Urbański grew up playing in the youth teams of KS Tymbark, Turbacz Mszana Dolna and Wisła Kraków. In 2023, he transferred to Legia Warsaw. He started the 2023–24 season playing in the under-19 team in the Central Junior League and for Legia's reserve team in group I of the III liga.

=== Legia Warsaw ===
Urbański made his first-team debut on 10 March 2024 in a 0–1 loss against Widzew Łódź. He scored his debut goal on 18 August 2024 in a league game against Radomiak Radom.

== Career statistics ==
As of match played 8 November 2026

Appearances and goals by club, season and competition
Club	Season	League			Polish Cup		Continental		Other		Total	
Club	Season	Division	Apps	Goals	Apps	Goals	Apps	Goals	Apps	Goals	Apps	Goals
Legia Warsaw II	2023–24	III liga, gr. I	15	2	1	0	—		—		16	2
Legia Warsaw II	2024–25	III liga, gr. I	1	0	—		—		—		1	0
Legia Warsaw II	2025–26	III liga, gr. I	2	0	—		—		—		2	0
Legia Warsaw II	Total		18	2	1	0	—		—		19	2
Legia Warsaw	2023–24	Ekstraklasa	6	0	—		—		—		6	0
Legia Warsaw	2024–25	Ekstraklasa	20	3	4	0	1 (Note: Appearance in UEFA Conference League)	0	—		25	3
Legia Warsaw	2025–26	Ekstraklasa	21	1	0	0	8 (Note: Three appearances in UEFA Europa League, five appearances in UEFA Conference League)	0	1 (Note: Appearance in Polish Super Cup)	0	30	1
Legia Warsaw	2026–27	Ekstraklasa	13	0	1	0	—		—		14	0
Legia Warsaw	Total		60	4	5	0	9	0	1	0	75	4
Career total			78	6	6	0	9	0	1	0	94	6

== Honours ==
Legia Warsaw

- Polish Cup: 2024–25
- Polish Super Cup: 2025

Legia Warsaw II

- III liga, group I: 2025–26
