= Gabriel Kobylak =

Polish footballer (born 2002)

Personal information
- Full name: Gabriel Kobylak
- Date of birth: 20 February 2002 (age 24)
- Place of birth: Brzozów, Poland
- Height: 1.90 m (6 ft 3 in)
- Position: Goalkeeper

Team information
- Current team: GKS Katowice
- Number: 87

Youth career
- Zgoda Zarszyn
- Orzeł Bażanówka
- 2014–2016: Ekoball Sanok
- 2016–2018: Karpaty Krosno

Senior career*
Years	Team	Apps	(Gls)
2018	Karpaty Krosno	0	(0)
2018–2026	Legia Warsaw II	26	(0)
2020–2022	→ Puszcza Niepołomice (loan)	50	(0)
2022–2023	→ Radomiak Radom (loan)	29	(0)
2023–2026	Legia Warsaw	7	(0)
2024	→ Radomiak Radom (loan)	11	(1)
2026–	GKS Katowice	2	(0)

International career
2020	Poland U19	1	(0)
- * Club domestic league appearances and goals as of 22:08, 12 August 2026 (UTC)

Gabriel Kobylak (born 20 February 2002) is a Polish professional footballer who plays as a goalkeeper for Ekstraklasa club GKS Katowice.

== Club career ==
=== Early career and Legia Warsaw ===
Kobylak began playing football in the youth team of Zgoda Zarszyn. He subsequently trained with Orzeł Bażanówka, Ekoball Sanok and Karpaty Krosno.

In 2018, at the age of 16, he joined the academy of Legia Warsaw. He initially played for the club's under-19 and reserve teams. He made his senior competitive debut with Legia Warsaw II, appearing four times in the III liga during the 2018–19 season. The reserve team also won the Masovian regional stage of the Polish Cup that season.

=== Loan to Puszcza Niepołomice ===
On 14 August 2020, Kobylak joined Puszcza Niepołomice on a season-long loan in order to gain experience in the I liga. He made 20 competitive appearances during his first campaign, recording seven clean sheets. He also helped Puszcza eliminate Lechia Gdańsk from the Polish Cup.

His loan was extended for the 2021–22 season. Kobylak established himself as Puszcza's first-choice goalkeeper, making 33 league appearances and keeping six clean sheets. Across his two seasons in Niepołomice, he made 50 league appearances and three further appearances in the Polish Cup.

=== Radomiak Radom ===
On 18 June 2022, Kobylak joined Ekstraklasa club Radomiak Radom on loan for the 2022–23 season. He made his top-flight debut with the club and appeared in 29 league matches during the campaign.

Kobylak recorded four consecutive clean sheets after the 2022–23 winter break. His run without conceding lasted 442 minutes and earned him the Ekstraklasa Young Player of the Month award for February 2023.

He returned to Legia following the loan but did not make a first-team appearance during the first half of the 2023–24 season. Kobylak instead played nine league matches for the reserve team. On 29 January 2024, he signed a new contract with Legia running until June 2027 and returned to Radomiak on loan for the remainder of the season.

On 1 April 2024, Kobylak scored the first goal of his professional career in a 1–1 league draw against his former club Puszcza Niepołomice. In the 66th minute, his long clearance bounced over the opposing goalkeeper, Oliwier Zych, and entered the net. He made 11 league appearances and scored once during his second spell with Radomiak.

=== Legia Warsaw first team ===
After returning to Warsaw, Kobylak made his Legia first-team debut on 1 August 2024. He kept a clean sheet in a 5–0 away victory over Caernarfon Town in the second qualifying round of the 2024–25 UEFA Conference League.

During the 2024–25 season, he made seven Ekstraklasa, two Polish Cup and five European appearances. Legia finished the campaign by winning the 2024–25 Polish Cup, defeating Pogoń Szczecin 4–3 in the final.

Kobylak made two further first-team appearances in the 2025–26 season, one in the Polish Cup and one in the UEFA Conference League. He also appeared six times for Legia's reserve team, which won its III liga group and earned promotion to the II liga. In total, he made 16 appearances for Legia's first team.

=== GKS Katowice ===
On 22 June 2026, Kobylak transferred permanently from Legia to GKS Katowice. He signed a contract until 30 June 2028, with an option for an additional season.

== International career ==
In September 2020, Kobylak was called up to the Poland under-19 team. He made one appearance for the team.

== Career statistics ==
As of match played 12 August 2026

Appearances and goals by club, season and competition
Club	Season	League			Polish Cup		Europe		Other		Total	
Club	Season	Division	Apps	Goals	Apps	Goals	Apps	Goals	Apps	Goals	Apps	Goals
Legia Warsaw II	2018–19	III liga, gr. I	4	0	—		—		—		4	0
Legia Warsaw II	2019–20	III liga, gr. I	2	0	1	0	—		—		3	0
Legia Warsaw II	2023–24	III liga, gr. I	9	0	0	0	—		—		9	0
Legia Warsaw II	2024–25	III liga, gr. I	5	0	—		—		—		5	0
Legia Warsaw II	2025–26	III liga, gr. I	6	0	—		—		—		6	0
Legia Warsaw II	Total		26	0	1	0	—		—		27	0
Puszcza Niepołomice (loan)	2020–21	I liga	17	0	3	0	—		—		20	0
Puszcza Niepołomice (loan)	2021–22	I liga	33	0	0	0	—		—		33	0
Puszcza Niepołomice (loan)	Total		50	0	3	0	—		—		53	0
Radomiak Radom (loan)	2022–23	Ekstraklasa	29	0	1	0	—		—		30	0
Radomiak Radom (loan)	2023–24	Ekstraklasa	11	1	—		—		—		11	1
Legia Warsaw	2024–25	Ekstraklasa	7	0	2	0	5 (Note: Appearance(s) in UEFA Conference League)	0	—		14	0
Legia Warsaw	2025–26	Ekstraklasa	0	0	1	0	1	0	0	0	2	0
Legia Warsaw	Total		7	0	3	0	6	0	0	0	16	0
GKS Katowice	2026–27	Ekstraklasa	2	0	0	0	4	0	—		6	0
Career total			123	1	8	0	7	0	0	0	138	1

== Honours ==
Legia Warsaw

- Polish Cup: 2024–25

Legia Warsaw II

- III liga, group I: 2025–26
- Polish Cup (Masovia regionals): 2018–19

Individual

- Ekstraklasa Young Player of the Month: February 2023
