= Jordan Majchrzak =

Polish footballer (born 2004)

Personal information
- Full name: Jordan Aleksander Majchrzak
- Date of birth: 8 October 2004 (age 22)
- Place of birth: Zawiercie, Poland
- Height: 1.86 m (6 ft 1 in)
- Position: Forward

Team information
- Current team: VfB Stuttgart II
- Number: 30

Youth career
- 2011–2014: Warta Zawiercie
- 2014–2015: AF Silent Dąbrowa Górnicza
- 2015–2016: MUKP Dąbrowa Górnicza
- 2016–2020: Rozwój Katowice
- 2020–2021: Legia Warsaw

Senior career*
Years	Team	Apps	(Gls)
2021–2025	Legia Warsaw II	24	(10)
2022–2023	→ Roma (loan)	1	(0)
2023–2024	→ Puszcza Niepołomice (loan)	19	(1)
2024–2025	Legia Warsaw	1	(0)
2025	→ Arka Gdynia (loan)	15	(1)
2025–	VfB Stuttgart II	11	(2)

International career^{‡}
2023	Poland U19	6	(0)
2023–2025	Poland U20	13	(1)
- * Club domestic league appearances and goals as of 30 May 2026 ‡ National team caps and goals as of 18:14, 25 March 2025 (UTC)

Jordan Aleksander Majchrzak (born 8 October 2004) is a Polish professional footballer who plays as a forward for 3. Liga club VfB Stuttgart II.

== Club career ==
Majchrzak is a youth product of Warta Zawiercie, AF Silent Dąbrowa Górnicza, Rozwój Katowice and Legia Warsaw. On 23 September 2022, he joined Serie A club Roma on a season-long loan, with an option to buy.

Having originally been assigned to their under-19 team, Majchrzak made his professional debut for Roma on 12 March 2023, as a late substitute in a 4–3 Serie A home loss against Sassuolo. In April of the same year, he was part of Roma's under-19 squad that won the Coppa Italia Primavera.

After returning from Italy, he extended his contract with Legia on 19 July 2023 and was sent on another season-long loan, this time joining Ekstraklasa newcomers Puszcza Niepołomice. He scored his first top division goal on 13 April 2024, opening the score in a 2–1 win over Lech Poznań.

On 2 February 2025, Majchrzak made his first top-flight appearance for Legia as a late substitute in a 1–1 home draw against Korona Kielce. Three days later, he joined I liga side Arka Gdynia on loan for the rest of the season.

On 8 August 2025, Majchrzak joined German 3. Liga side VfB Stuttgart II, the reserve team of VfB Stuttgart.

== International career ==
Majchrzak was called up to a training camp with the Poland under-19 national team in February 2023.

In June of the same year, he was included in the Polish squad that took part in the 2023 UEFA European Under-19 Championship in Malta.

== Personal life ==
Majchrzak's father, Robert, is a former footballer who played as a defender, and made 14 Ekstraklasa appearances for Raków Częstochowa in 1998. He currently works as a coach, and previously managed his son's first youth club, Warta Zawiercie.

== Style of play ==
Majchrzak has been described as a headstrong and composed forward, who is tall and strong, as well as aggressive and good at linking-up with his teammates in the final meters. An energetic presser, he has also been regarded for his work rate.

== Career statistics ==
As of match played 16 May 2026

Appearances and goals by club, season and competition
Club	Season	League			National cup (Note: Includes Polish Cup)		Europe		Other		Total	
Club	Season	Division	Apps	Goals	Apps	Goals	Apps	Goals	Apps	Goals	Apps	Goals
Legia Warsaw II	2020–21	III liga, gr. I	3	0	—		—		—		3	0
Legia Warsaw II	2021–22	III liga, gr. I	6	0	—		—		—		6	0
Legia Warsaw II	2022–23	III liga, gr. I	4	1	0	0	—		—		4	1
Legia Warsaw II	2024–25	III liga, gr. I	10	6	—		—		—		10	6
Legia Warsaw II	2025–26	III liga, gr. I	1	3	—		—		—		1	3
Legia Warsaw II	Total		24	10	0	0	—		—		24	10
Roma (loan)	2022–23	Serie A	1	0	0	0	0	0	—		1	0
Puszcza Niepołomice (loan)	2023–24	Ekstraklasa	19	1	2	0	—		—		21	1
Legia Warsaw	2024–25	Ekstraklasa	1	0	0	0	3 (Note: Appearances in UEFA Conference League)	0	—		4	0
Arka Gdynia (loan)	2024–25	I liga	15	1	—		—		—		15	1
VfB Stuttgart II	2025–26	3. Liga	11	2	—		—		—		11	2
Career total			71	14	2	0	3	0	0	0	76	14

== Honours ==
Legia Warsaw II

- Polish Cup (Masovia regionals): 2021–22

Roma U19

- Coppa Italia Primavera: 2022–23

Arka Gdynia

- I liga: 2024–25
