= Marcel Mendes-Dudziński =

Polish footballer (born 2005)

Personal information
- Full name: Marcel Mendes-Dudziński
- Date of birth: 14 May 2005 (age 21)
- Place of birth: Szczecin, Poland
- Height: 1.93 m (6 ft 4 in)
- Position: Goalkeeper

Team information
- Current team: Piast Gliwice
- Number: 12

Youth career
- 2014–2015: Kluczevia Stargard
- 2015–2016: Brazil da Bola Stargard
- 2016–2017: Błękitni Stargard
- 2017–2021: Pogoń Szczecin
- 2021–2024: Benfica

Senior career*
Years	Team	Apps	(Gls)
2021	Pogoń Szczecin II	3	(0)
2024–2026	Legia Warsaw	0	(0)
2024–2026	Legia Warsaw II	10	(0)
2026	→ Świt Szczecin (loan)	0	(0)
2026–	Piast Gliwice	0	(0)

International career
2019	Poland U15	3	(0)
2021	Poland U16	1	(0)
2021	Poland U17	6	(0)
2023	Poland U18	1	(0)
2023	Poland U19	3	(0)
- * Club domestic league appearances and goals as of 18:55, 31 May 2026 (UTC)

Marcel Mendes-Dudziński (born 14 May 2005) is a Polish professional footballer who plays as a goalkeeper for Ekstraklasa club Piast Gliwice.

== Early life ==
Mendes-Dudziński started playing football at the age of five.

== Club career ==
On 3 July 2024, after spending three years in Benfica's youth system, Mendes-Dudziński returned to Poland to join Ekstraklasa club Legia Warsaw on a four-year contract. On 16 January 2026, he joined II liga side Świt Szczecin on loan for the remainder of the season. He left Legia on 9 July 2026 without making a first-team appearance.

Two days later, Mendes-Dudziński signed a three-year deal with fellow Ekstraklasa club Piast Gliwice.

== International career ==
He has captained the Poland national under-17 team.

== Style of play ==
Mendes-Dudziński has received comparisons to Cameroon international Andre Onana.

== Personal life ==
Born to a Polish mother and a Brazilian father, he also holds Brazilian citizenship. He has regarded Brazil international Ederson as his football idol.

== Career statistics ==
As of match played 30 April 2025

Appearances and goals by club, season and competition
Club	Season	League			Polish Cup		Europe		Other		Total	
Club	Season	Division	Apps	Goals	Apps	Goals	Apps	Goals	Apps	Goals	Apps	Goals
Pogoń Szczecin II	2020–21	III liga, gr. I	3	0	—		—		—		3	0
Legia Warsaw	2024–25	Ekstraklasa	0	0	0	0	0	0	0	0	0	0
Legia Warsaw	2025–26	Ekstraklasa	0	0	0	0	0	0	0	0	0	0
Legia Warsaw	Total		0	0	0	0	0	0	0	0	0	0
Legia Warsaw II	2024–25	III liga, gr. I	10	0	—		—		—		10	0
Świt Szczecin (loan)	2025–26	II liga	0	0	—		—		—		0	0
Piast Gliwice	2026–27	Ekstraklasa	0	0	0	0	—		—		0	0
Career total			13	0	0	0	0	0	0	0	13	0

== Honours ==
Legia Warsaw II

- Polish Cup (Masovia regionals): 2024–25
