= Maciej Kikolski =

Polish footballer (born 2004)

Personal information
- Date of birth: 23 February 2004 (age 22)
- Place of birth: Warsaw, Poland
- Height: 1.93 m (6 ft 4 in)
- Position: Goalkeeper

Team information
- Current team: GKS Katowice (on loan from Widzew Łódź)
- Number: 1

Youth career
- –2016: Escola Varsovia
- 2016–2017: Legia Warsaw
- 2017–2019: Legionovia Legionowo
- 2019–2020: Miedź Legnica
- 2020–2022: Legia Warsaw

Senior career*
Years	Team	Apps	(Gls)
2020–2022	Legia Warsaw II	23	(0)
2021–2025	Legia Warsaw	0	(0)
2022–2023	→ Pogoń Siedlce (loan)	31	(0)
2023–2024	→ GKS Tychy (loan)	34	(0)
2024–2025	→ Radomiak Radom (loan)	31	(0)
2025–	Widzew Łódź	9	(0)
2026	Widzew Łódź II	1	(0)
2026–	→ GKS Katowice (loan)	0	(0)

International career^{‡}
2022	Poland U19	1	(0)
2023–2025	Poland U20	7	(0)
- * Club domestic league appearances and goals as of 24 June 2026 ‡ National team caps and goals as of 21 March 2025

Maciej Kikolski (born 23 February 2004) is a Polish professional footballer who plays as a goalkeeper for Ekstraklasa club GKS Katowice, on loan from Widzew Łódź. He has represented Poland at under-19 and under-20 level.

== Club career ==
=== Early career ===
Kikolski was born in Warsaw and began playing football in the academy of Escola Varsovia. He subsequently trained with Legia Warsaw, Legionovia Legionowo and Miedź Legnica before returning to Legia in 2020.

He made his senior football debut for Legia's reserve team in the spring of 2021. He went on to make 23 appearances for the reserves and a further 21 appearances for the club's under-19 side. Kikolski also trained with Legia's first team and took part in first-team training camps, but did not make a competitive first-team appearance for the club.

=== Loans from Legia Warsaw ===
In July 2022, Kikolski joined II liga club Pogoń Siedlce on loan for the 2022–23 season. He made 31 league appearances and kept nine clean sheets during the campaign.

In June 2023, he moved on a season-long loan to I liga side GKS Tychy. He was the club's first-choice goalkeeper throughout the 2023–24 season, playing in all 34 league matches and recording 12 clean sheets.

After returning from Tychy, Kikolski extended his contract with Legia until June 2028. Four days later, he was loaned to Ekstraklasa club Radomiak Radom for the 2024–25 season.

Kikolski made his Ekstraklasa debut on 20 July 2024, starting in Radomiak's 2–1 away win against GKS Katowice. He made 31 league appearances and two appearances in the Polish Cup, keeping six clean sheets in all competitions.

=== Widzew Łódź ===
On 16 June 2025, Kikolski completed a permanent transfer from Legia Warsaw to Widzew Łódź. He signed a contract until June 2029, with an option to extend it for a further year.

He made his Widzew debut on 2 August 2025, keeping a clean sheet in a 3–0 league victory over GKS Katowice. During the 2025–26 season, he made nine Ekstraklasa appearances and one Polish Cup appearance, recording three clean sheets.

On 24 June 2026, Kikolski joined GKS Katowice on loan until June 2027. The agreement included an option for GKS to sign him permanently.

== International career ==
Kikolski made his debut for the Poland under-19 team on 29 November 2022. He played the full match as Poland defeated Malta 5–1 in a friendly tournament in Malta.

He made his first appearance for the Poland under-20 team on 13 October 2023, playing the full match in a 1–0 defeat to Italy in the Under 20 Elite League.

His later under-20 appearances included a 4–2 victory over Turkey in October 2024 and a 1–0 win against Romania on 21 March 2025. Kikolski captained the team in the latter match.

== Honours ==
Legia Warsaw II

- Polish Cup (Masovia regionals): 2021–22
