= Kacper Chodyna =

Polish footballer (born 1999)

Personal information
- Full name: Kacper Chodyna
- Date of birth: 24 May 1999 (age 27)
- Place of birth: Drawsko Pomorskie, Poland
- Height: 1.76 m (5 ft 9 in)
- Positions: Right-back; midfielder

Team information
- Current team: Legia Warsaw
- Number: 11

Youth career
- 2007–2009: Ina Ińsko
- 2009–2012: Światowid Łobez
- 2012–2016: Lech Poznań

Senior career*
Years	Team	Apps	(Gls)
2016–2017	Lech Poznań II	13	(1)
2017–2020	Zagłębie Lubin II	41	(4)
2018	→ Bytovia Bytów (loan)	3	(0)
2020–2024	Zagłębie Lubin	123	(20)
2024–	Legia Warsaw	51	(6)

International career
2014–2015	Poland U16	8	(2)
2015–2016	Poland U17	7	(0)
2016	Poland U18	3	(0)
2017	Poland U19	5	(0)
2018	Poland U20	1	(0)
- * Club domestic league appearances and goals as of 08:46, 9 November 2026 (UTC)

Kacper Chodyna (born 24 May 1999) is a Polish professional footballer who plays for Ekstraklasa club Legia Warsaw.

== Early career ==
At the age of 10, Chodyna was invited to train with AC Milan youth groups. In 2012, he moved to Lech Poznań.

== Club career ==
=== Lech Poznań II ===
On 6 August 2016, Chodyna made his professional debut for Lech Poznań II in a 0–1 away win against Pogoń Szczecin II.

=== Zagłębie Lubin ===
On 10 March 2017, he moved to Zagłębie Lubin II with his teammate Serafin Szota.

==== Loan to Bytovia Bytów ====
On 28 August 2018, his loan to Bytovia Bytów was announced. He made his debut there in a 1–1 home draw with Wigry Suwałki. Throughout the loan, which lasted until 14 December, he appeared in five matches and did not score any goals.

==== Return to Zagłębie Lubin ====
On 9 February 2020, he made his Ekstraklasa debut in a 2–0 away loss against Piast Gliwice. In the 2023–24 season, Chodyna recorded seven goals and ten assists in 31 league appearances, and was Zagłębie's second-best goalscorer during that campaign.

=== Legia Warsaw ===
On 12 June 2024, Legia Warsaw announced the signing of Chodyna on a four-year deal, for a reported fee of €860,000. He made his debut there on 25 July, in the second round of UEFA Conference League eliminations, which was a 6–0 home victory over Caernarfon Town F.C.

== Career statistics ==
As of match played 23 May 2026

Appearances and goals by club, season and competition
Club	Season	League			Polish Cup		Europe		Other		Total	
Club	Season	Division	Apps	Goals	Apps	Goals	Apps	Goals	Apps	Goals	Apps	Goals
Lech Poznań II	2016–17	III liga, gr. II	13	1	—		—		—		13	1
Zagłębie Lubin II	2016–17	IV liga	3	2	—		—		—		3	2
Zagłębie Lubin II	2017–18	III liga, gr. III	19	1	1	0	—		—		20	1
Zagłębie Lubin II	2018–19	III liga, gr. III	3	1	—		—		—		3	1
Zagłębie Lubin II	2019–20	III liga, gr. III	16	0	1	0	—		—		17	0
Zagłębie Lubin II	Total		41	4	2	0	—		—		43	4
Bytovia Bytów (loan)	2018–19	I liga	3	0	2	0	—		—		5	0
Zagłębie Lubin	2019–20	Ekstraklasa	1	0	0	0	—		—		1	0
Zagłębie Lubin	2020–21	Ekstraklasa	24	2	2	0	—		—		26	2
Zagłębie Lubin	2021–22	Ekstraklasa	32	4	3	0	—		—		35	4
Zagłębie Lubin	2022–23	Ekstraklasa	33	7	1	0	—		—		34	7
Zagłębie Lubin	2023–24	Ekstraklasa	33	7	1	0	—		—		34	7
Zagłębie Lubin	Total		123	20	7	0	—		—		130	20
Legia Warsaw	2024–25	Ekstraklasa	27	3	5	1	13 (Note: Appearances in UEFA Conference League)	2	—		45	6
Legia Warsaw	2025–26	Ekstraklasa	16	2	1	0	9 (Note: Five appearances in UEFA Europa League, four appearances in UEFA Conference League)	0	1 (Note: Appearance in Polish Super Cup)	0	27	2
Legia Warsaw	Total		43	5	6	1	22	2	1	0	72	8
Career total			223	30	17	1	22	2	1	0	263	33

== Honours ==
Zagłębie Lubin II

- IV liga Lower Silesia West: 2016–17
- Polish Cup (Lower Silesia regionals): 2016–17
- Polish Cup (Legnica regionals): 2016–17, 2019–20

Legia Warsaw

- Polish Cup: 2024–25
- Polish Super Cup: 2025

Individual

- Ekstraklasa Young Player of the Month: November 2020
