= Rúben Vinagre =

Portuguese footballer (born 1999)

Personal information
- Full name: Rúben Gonçalo da Silva Nascimento Vinagre
- Date of birth: 9 April 1999 (age 27)
- Place of birth: Charneca de Caparica, Portugal
- Height: 1.74 m (5 ft 9 in)
- Position: Wing-back

Team information
- Current team: Legia Warsaw
- Number: 19

Youth career
- 2008–2009: Barreirense
- 2009–2010: Sporting CP
- 2010–2012: Belenenses
- 2012–2015: Sporting CP
- 2015–2016: Monaco

Senior career*
Years	Team	Apps	(Gls)
2016–2018	Monaco	0	(0)
2017–2018	→ Wolverhampton Wanderers (loan)	9	(1)
2018–2022	Wolverhampton Wanderers	34	(0)
2020	→ Olympiacos (loan)	2	(0)
2021	→ Famalicão (loan)	20	(0)
2021–2022	→ Sporting CP (loan)	12	(0)
2022–2025	Sporting CP	0	(0)
2022–2023	→ Everton (loan)	2	(0)
2023–2024	→ Hull City (loan)	10	(0)
2024	→ Hellas Verona (loan)	12	(0)
2024–2025	→ Legia Warsaw (loan)	18	(0)
2025–	Legia Warsaw	32	(2)

International career
2015	Portugal U16	7	(0)
2015–2016	Portugal U17	16	(0)
2016–2017	Portugal U18	3	(0)
2017–2018	Portugal U19	16	(0)
2019	Portugal U20	9	(0)
2018–2020	Portugal U21	4	(0)
Medal record
Men's football
Representing Portugal
UEFA European Under-19 Championship
Winner	2018 Finland
UEFA European Under-17 Championship
Winner	2016 Azerbaijan
- * Club domestic league appearances and goals as of 20:36, 3 August 2026 (UTC)

Rúben Gonçalo da Silva Nascimento Vinagre (born 9 April 1999) is a Portuguese professional footballer who plays as a left wing-back for Ekstraklasa club Legia Warsaw.

== Club career ==
=== Early career ===
Born in Charneca de Caparica, Almada, Lisbon metropolitan area, Vinagre had two spells in the academy of Sporting CP before joining Ligue 1 club Monaco on 12 June 2015. After spending his first season with the youth side, he signed a professional contract.

In August 2016, a deal was agreed for Vinagre to be loaned to LigaPro side Académica to gain experience, but FIFA, whose approval was required due to the player being under 18, refused to sanction the deal. After an unsuccessful appeal, he returned to his parent club without making any competitive appearances.

=== Wolverhampton Wanderers ===
Vinagre agreed to a new deal with Monaco in June 2017, running until summer 2022. Shortly after, he moved on loan to English side Wolverhampton Wanderers for the upcoming season. He made his senior debut on 8 August in a 1–0 win against Yeovil Town in the first round of the EFL Cup. He scored his first goal in professional football on 30 September, the third of his team's 4–0 away victory over Burton Albion in the Championship.

After their promotion to the Premier League as champions, Vinagre signed a five-year contract for an undisclosed fee on 30 June 2018. The subsequent recruitment of Jonny meant that he was primarily used as a back-up, but still made 17 appearances (21 in all competitions) as they qualified for the UEFA Europa League through a seventh-place finish; his first league match took place on 11 August 2018, when he came on as a late substitute in the 2–2 home draw with Everton.

Vinagre made his European debut on 25 July 2019, in Wolves's 2–0 home win over Crusaders in the Europa League second qualifying round, closing the score in injury time. With Jonny seriously injured, he totalled 13 games in the team's run to the quarter-finals, where they were ousted by eventual winners Sevilla.

On 5 October 2020, Vinagre moved to Olympiacos of the Super League Greece on a season-long loan, with an option to make the deal permanent. However, after failing to impose himself at the Pedro Martins-led squad, mainly due to injury problems, he joined Famalicão also on loan, rejoining former Wolverhampton teammates Leonardo Campana and Bruno Jordão. He made his Primeira Liga debut for the latter on 8 January 2021, starting in a 1–4 home loss to Porto.

=== Sporting CP ===
Vinagre was loaned to Sporting on 9 July 2021, with a buying option. He made only 18 competitive appearances in his first season, and on 1 July 2022 the club signed him permanently.

On 27 July 2022, Vinagre joined Everton on a season-long loan; an option to buy was also included in the deal. During his spell at Goodison Park, he totalled only four games.

On 20 July 2023, Championship club Hull City announced the signing of Vinagre on loan for the season. He made his debut on 5 August, in the 2–1 loss away to Norwich City. He was recalled by Sporting on 26 January 2024 and, later that day, moved to Serie A club Hellas Verona until the end of the campaign, with a reported buying option of €4 million.

=== Legia Warsaw ===
Vinagre joined Legia Warsaw of the Polish Ekstraklasa in July 2024, on a season-long loan with an option to make the move permanent. On 6 February 2025, after providing nine assists in 28 appearances, a permanent move was agreed; his transfer was linked to that of goalkeeper Vladan Kovačević due to Sporting having already reached their loan limit, and Vinagre reportedly signed for a €2.3 million fee, the most expensive in the history of the Polish top division at the time.

On 2 May 2025, Vinagre was one of seven players on target as Legia defeated Pogoń Szczecin 4–3 to win the Polish Cup.

== International career ==
Vinagre contributed five appearances as Portugal won the 2016 UEFA European Under-17 Championship in Azerbaijan, following a penalty shoot-out defeat of Spain. He helped the under-19s to the same achievement two years later, playing the entire 4–3 extra-time victory against Italy in Seinäjoki.

On 11 October 2018, Vinagre won his first cap at under-21 level, in a 9–0 rout in Liechtenstein in the 2019 European Championship qualifiers.

== Career statistics ==
As of match played 23 May 2026

Appearances and goals by club, season and competition
Club	Season	League			National cup (Note: Includes FA Cup, Taça de Portugal, Polish Cup)		League cup (Note: Includes EFL Cup, Taça da Liga)		Europe		Total	
Club	Season	Division	Apps	Goals	Apps	Goals	Apps	Goals	Apps	Goals	Apps	Goals
Wolverhampton Wanderers	2017–18	EFL Championship	9	1	1	0	3	0	—		13	1
Wolverhampton Wanderers	2018–19	Premier League	17	0	2	0	2	0	—		21	0
Wolverhampton Wanderers	2019–20	Premier League	15	0	2	0	2	0	13 (Note: Appearances in UEFA Europa League)	2	32	2
Wolverhampton Wanderers	2020–21	Premier League	2	0	0	0	1	0	—		3	0
Wolverhampton Wanderers	Total		43	1	5	0	8	0	13	2	69	3
Olympiacos (loan)	2020–21	Super League Greece	2	0	0	0	—		2 (Note: Appearances in UEFA Champions League)	0	4	0
Famalicão (loan)	2020–21	Primeira Liga	20	0	0	0	—		—		20	0
Sporting CP (loan)	2021–22	Primeira Liga	12	0	2	0	2	0	2	0	18	0
Sporting CP	2022–23	Primeira Liga	—		—		—		—		—	
Sporting CP	2023–24	Primeira Liga	—		—		—		—		—	
Sporting CP	Total		0	0	0	0	0	0	0	0	0	0
Everton (loan)	2022–23	Premier League	2	0	0	0	2	0	—		4	0
Hull City (loan)	2023–24	EFL Championship	10	0	0	0	1	0	—		11	0
Hellas Verona (loan)	2023–24	Serie A	12	0	—		—		—		12	0
Legia Warsaw	2024–25	Ekstraklasa	33	1	5	1	—		12 (Note: Appearances in UEFA Conference League)	0	50	2
Legia Warsaw	2025–26	Ekstraklasa	15	0	1	0	—		11 (Note: Four appearances in UEFA Europa League, seven appearances in UEFA Conference League)	0	27	0
Legia Warsaw	Total		48	1	6	1	—		23	0	77	2
Career total			149	2	13	1	13	0	40	2	215	5

== Honours ==
Wolverhampton Wanderers

- EFL Championship: 2017–18

Olympiacos

- Super League Greece: 2020–21

Sporting CP

- Taça da Liga: 2021–22
- Supertaça Cândido de Oliveira: 2021

Legia Warsaw

- Polish Cup: 2024–25

Portugal U17

- UEFA European Under-17 Championship: 2016

Portugal U19

- UEFA European Under-19 Championship: 2018

Individual

- UEFA European Under-17 Championship Team of the Tournament: 2016
- UEFA European Under-19 Championship Team of the Tournament: 2018
