= Mateusz Szczepaniak (footballer, born 2007) =

Polish footballer

Personal information
- Date of birth: 5 January 2007 (age 19)
- Height: 1.79 m (5 ft 10 in)
- Position: Midfielder

Team information
- Current team: Legia Warsaw
- Number: 17

Youth career
- –2016: ŁSR Łuków
- 2016–2018: Orlęta Radzyń Podlaski
- 2018–2020: Wisła Puławy
- 2020: Górnik Łęczna
- 2020–2024: Legia Warsaw

Senior career*
Years	Team	Apps	(Gls)
2024–	Legia Warsaw II	20	(2)
2024–	Legia Warsaw	14	(0)
2025–2026	→ Pogoń Grodzisk Maz. (loan)	32	(7)

International career^{‡}
2021–2022	Poland U15	5	(1)
2023	Poland U16	2	(1)
2023–2024	Poland U17	12	(3)
2024–2025	Poland U18	10	(0)
2025–2026	Poland U19	12	(1)
2026–	Poland U20	1	(0)
2026–	Poland U21	2	(0)
- * Club domestic league appearances and goals as of 14:57, 10 November 2026 (UTC) ‡ National team caps and goals as of 21:27, 19 November 2026 (UTC)

Mateusz Szczepaniak (born 5 January 2007) is a Polish professional footballer who plays as a midfielder for Ekstraklasa club Legia Warsaw.

== Club career ==
Szczepaniak began his youth career at ŁSR Łuków, Orlęta Radzyń Podlaski, Wisła Puławy and Górnik Łęczna before joining Legia Warsaw's academy. In the 2023–24 season, he achieved the runner-up position in the Central Junior League U-17. He played the full 90 minutes in both legs of the final against Śląsk Wrocław, contributing to a 3–2 away victory in the first leg on 8 June 2024, where he received a yellow card, and a 2–4 home defeat in the second leg on 12 June 2024.

He debuted for Legia's senior team during the 2024–25 season in a match against Caernarfon Town on 25 July 2024. His first Ekstraklasa appearance came on 3 November 2024, in a 2–1 win over Widzew Łódź, entering in the 90th minute. On 28 November 2024, he scored his first goal for the club in a 3–0 win over Omonia Nicosia during the league phase of the 2024–25 UEFA Conference League, becoming the youngest scorer in the competition's history.

Ahead of the 2025–26 season, Szczepaniak extended his deal with Legia to June 2027 with a one-year option. On 18 July 2025, he joined I liga newcomers Pogoń Grodzisk Mazowiecki on a season-long loan. Szczepaniak earned his first start for the club on 19 July 2025 in a 2–1 victory over Stal Rzeszów at the Grodzisk Mazowiecki Stadium.

== Career statistics ==
As of match played 8 November 2026

Appearances and goals by club, season and competition
Club	Season	League			Polish Cup		Continental		Other		Total	
Club	Season	Division	Apps	Goals	Apps	Goals	Apps	Goals	Apps	Goals	Apps	Goals
Legia Warsaw II	2024–25	III liga, gr. I	14	1	—		—		—		14	1
Legia Warsaw II	2026–27	III liga, gr. I	6	1	—		—		—		6	1
Legia Warsaw II	Total		20	2	—		—		—		20	2
Legia Warsaw	2024–25	Ekstraklasa	7	0	2	0	5 (Note: Appearances in UEFA Conference League)	1	—		14	1
Legia Warsaw	2026–27	Ekstraklasa	7	0	1	0	—		—		8	0
Legia Warsaw	Total		14	0	3	0	5	1	—		22	1
Pogoń Grodzisk Mazowiecki (loan)	2025–26	I liga	32	7	1	0	—		—		33	7
Career total			66	9	4	0	5	1	0	0	75	10

== Honours ==
Legia Warsaw

- Polish Cup: 2024–25
