= Legia Training Center =

Sports venue in Książenice, Poland

- Interactive map of Legia Training Center
- Address: ul. Legionistów 3
- Location: Książenice, Poland
- Coordinates: 52.0726°N 20.7261°E
- Owner: Legia Warsaw
- Type: Stadium, training center
- Event: Association football
- Surface: Grass
- Current use: Association football

Construction
- Built: April 2019 – July 2020
- Opened: July 2020

Tenants
- Legia Warsaw (training); Legia Warsaw II; Legionistki Warsaw

The Legia Training Center is the sports venue and the training center of Legia Warsaw in Książenice. Legia Warsaw II plays home matches in the center, and the first team also plays friendly matches. It is called "the most modern training center in this part of Europe".

== Infrastructure ==
- 8 pitches
- First team zone
- Football Academy
- Offices of the sports division and other club departments
- LegiaLab Research and Development Center
- Surfaces for sports startups
- Publicly accessible recreational and sports infrastructure for residents
