= Sergio Barcia =

Spanish footballer (born 2000)

Personal information
- Full name: Sergio Barcia Laranxeira
- Date of birth: 31 December 2000 (age 25)
- Place of birth: Vigo, Spain
- Height: 1.86 m (6 ft 1 in)
- Position: Centre-back

Team information
- Current team: Braga

Youth career
- Colegio Hogar
- 2010–2019: Celta

Senior career*
| Years | Team | Apps | (Gls) |
| 2019–2020 | Celta B | 0 | (0) |
| 2019–2020 | → Ourense (loan) | 24 | (0) |
| 2020–2022 | Granada B | 47 | (6) |
| 2020–2022 | Granada | 2 | (0) |
| 2022–2023 | Celta B | 29 | (1) |
| 2023–2024 | Mirandés | 40 | (2) |
| 2024–2026 | Legia Warsaw | 7 | (1) |
| 2025–2026 | → Las Palmas (loan) | 34 | (1) |
| 2026– | Braga | 6 | (0) |
- * Club domestic league appearances and goals as of 22:15, 25 October 2026 (UTC)

Sergio Barcia Laranxeira (born 31 December 2000) is a Spanish professional footballer who plays as a central defender for Primeira Liga club Braga.

== Club career ==
Barcia was born in Vigo, Galicia, and joined RC Celta de Vigo's youth setup in 2010, aged nine, from Club Colegio Hogar. On 23 August 2019, after finishing his formation, he was loaned to Tercera División side Ourense CF for the season.

Barcia made his senior debut on 1 September 2019, playing 31 minutes in a 2–0 away loss against Deportivo Fabril. He was a regular starter during the campaign, appearing in 26 matches as his side missed out promotion in the play-offs.

On 31 August 2020, Barcia signed a three-year contract with Granada CF and was initially assigned to the reserves in Segunda División B. He made his first team – and La Liga – debut on 8 November, starting in a 2–0 away loss against Real Sociedad, as his side was heavily impacted by the COVID-19 pandemic.

On 18 July 2022, Barcia returned to Celta and was assigned to the reserves in Primera Federación. On 4 July 2023, he signed a two-year deal with Segunda División side CD Mirandés.

On 11 July 2024, Barcia joined Polish Ekstraklasa club Legia Warsaw on a permanent deal, signing a three-year contract. Roughly one year later, after being rarely used, he returned to his home country after agreeing to a one-year loan deal with UD Las Palmas in the second division.

On 30 June 2026, Barcia signed with Primeira Liga side Braga.

== Career statistics ==
As of match played 29 October 2026

Appearances and goals by club, season and competition
| Club | Season | League | | | National cup (Note: Includes Copa del Rey, Polish Cup) | | League Cup | | Europe | | Other | | Total | |
| Club | Season | Division | Apps | Goals | Apps | Goals | Apps | Goals | Apps | Goals | Apps | Goals | Apps | Goals |
|---|---|---|---|---|---|---|---|---|---|---|---|---|---|---|
| Celta B | 2018–19 | Segunda División B | 0 | 0 | — | | — | | — | | — | | 0 | 0 |
| Ourense (loan) | 2019–20 | Tercera Federación | 24 | 0 | — | | — | | — | | 2 (Note: Appearances in Segunda División B play-offs) | 0 | 26 | 0 |
| Granada B | 2020–21 | Segunda División B | 18 | 0 | — | | — | | — | | — | | 18 | 0 |
| Granada B | 2021–22 | Segunda Federación | 29 | 6 | — | | — | | — | | — | | 29 | 6 |
| Granada B | Total | | 47 | 6 | — | | — | | — | | — | | 47 | 6 |
| Granada | 2020–21 | La Liga | 1 | 0 | 1 | 0 | — | | — | | — | | 2 | 0 |
| Granada | 2021–22 | La Liga | 1 | 0 | 0 | 0 | — | | — | | — | | 1 | 0 |
| Granada | Total | | 2 | 0 | 1 | 0 | — | | — | | — | | 3 | 0 |
| Celta B | 2022–23 | Primera Federación | 29 | 1 | — | | — | | — | | 2 (Note: Appearances in Primera Federación play-offs) | 0 | 31 | 1 |
| Mirandés | 2023–24 | Segunda División | 40 | 2 | 1 | 0 | — | | — | | — | | 41 | 2 |
| Legia Warsaw | 2024–25 | Ekstraklasa | 7 | 1 | 1 | 0 | — | | 7 (Note: Appearances in UEFA Conference League) | 1 | — | | 15 | 2 |
| Las Palmas (loan) | 2025–26 | Segunda División | 34 | 1 | 0 | 0 | — | | — | | 0 | 0 | 34 | 1 |
| Braga | 2026–27 | Primeira Liga | 6 | 0 | 0 | 0 | 1 | 0 | 7 | 0 | — | | 14 | 0 |
| Career total | | | 189 | 11 | 3 | 0 | 1 | 0 | 14 | 1 | 4 | 0 | 211 | 12 |

== Honours ==
Legia Warsaw

- Polish Cup: 2024–25
