= Legia Warsaw II =

- Full name: Legia II Warszawa SA
- Nicknames: Wojskowi (The Militarians); Legioniści (The Legionaries)
- Ground: Legia Training Center
- Capacity: 1,000
- Chairman: Dariusz Mioduski
- Manager: Marcin Matysiak
- League: II liga
- 2025-26: III liga, group I, 1st of 18 (promoted)
- Website: legia.com/pilka-nozna/druzyna-druga
| Home colours | Away colours |

Legia Warsaw II, in Poland known as Legia II Warszawa, is a Polish football team, which serves as the reserve side of Legia Warsaw. They compete in the II liga, the third division of Polish football, and play their home matches at the Legia Training Center in Książenice.

== History ==
The team was established in the 1920s. After the World War II, the club resumed its activity. In 1952, the club surprisingly reached the final of the Polish Cup, previously eliminating Lechia Zielona Góra II (6–2), Naprzód Lipiny (2–1), ŁKS Łódź (7–1), Górnik Zabrze (2–1), Ruch Chorzów (2–1) and Wisła Kraków (0–0, 1–0). In the final Legia II lost 0–1 to Polonia Warsaw.

At the beginning of the 21st century, Legia Warsaw II played between the III and IV liga. After the 2006–07 season, the reserve team was withdrawn from the league, giving way to the Młoda Ekstraklasa team, which had its own separate competition. In 2013, after the elimination of this competition, Legia II returned to III liga.

Despite the existence of the Młoda Ekstraklasa, Legia's reserves continued to compete in the Polish Cup at the regional level. In the 2007–08 season, Legia II reached the final of these games, losing 0–1 to Hutnik Warsaw. However, thanks to the participation in the finals, the reserve team got the right to start in the competition at the central level in the next season, where it ended its adventure in the first round. In the 2011–12 season, the reserves of the Warsaw club won the Polish Cup at the provincial level, defeating Broń Radom 2–1 in the final. In the next season, they started again in the central level competitions, also reaching the first round.

In the 2019–20 season, Legia II reached the round of 16 of the Polish Cup (previously eliminating higher-ranked teams of Wigry Suwałki and Odra Opole), where they were defeated by Piast Gliwice (0–2). All the games were held at the Ząbki City Stadium (then the home for Legia II games).

On 15 June 2022, Legia II defeated Legionovia Legionowo 1–0 and won the Mazovian Polish Cup, thus qualifying for the central tier of the cup in the 2022–23 season. On 30 August 2022, it lost in a home first round match against Wisła Kraków 0–5 and dropped out of the competition. In the 2022–23 season, Legia II successfully defended the Polish Cup at the Mazovian level, winning 3–0 against Pogoń Grodzisk Mazowiecki in the final. In the first round of the central level competition of the 2023–24 campaign, on 27 September 2023, Legia II unexpectedly eliminated Ekstraklasa club Ruch Chorzów. In the next round, after overtime, they suffered a loss to another representative of Poland's top league, Korona Kielce, effectively dropping out of the competition in the round of 32.

== Stadium ==
Legia II play their games at the Legia Training Center in Książenice, Grodzisk Mazowiecki Commune, Masovian Voivodeship. In 2020 they played their home games at the Grodzisk Mazowiecki City Stadium, and in 2016–2020 at the Ząbki City Stadium.

== Honours ==
- III liga
  - Champions: 2003–04 (Masovia), 2025–26 (Group I)
- Polish Cup
  - Runners-up: 1951–52
- Polish Cup (Masovia regionals)
  - Winners: 2011–12, 2018–19, 2021–22, 2022–23, 2024–25
  - Runners-up: 2000–01, 2007–08, 2014–15, 2017–18, 2020–21
- Polish Cup (Warsaw regionals)
  - Winners: 1986–87, 1993–94, 1997–98

== Players ==
=== Current squad ===
As of 9 September 2026

Note: Flags indicate national team as defined under FIFA eligibility rules; some limited exceptions apply. Players may hold more than one non-FIFA nationality.

| No. | Pos. | Nation | Player |
|---|---|---|---|
| 1 | GK | UKR | Denys Stolyarenko |
| 2 | DF | POL | Maksymilian Dołowy |
| 3 | DF | POL | Mateusz Lauryn |
| 4 | DF | POL | Łukasz Góra |
| 5 | DF | POL | Rafał Boczoń |
| 7 | FW | POL | Cyprian Pchełka |
| 8 | MF | POL | Maciej Saletra |
| 9 | FW | POL | Przemysław Mizera |
| 11 | FW | POL | Adam Ryczkowski |
| 12 | GK | POL | Jakub Trojanowski |
| 14 | MF | POL | Mateusz Możdżeń (captain) |
| 16 | DF | POL | Patryk Konik |
| 17 | FW | POL | Dawid Kiedrowicz |
| 18 | DF | USA | Jeremiah White IV |
| 19 | FW | POL | Edouard Etchemendigaray |
| 21 | DF | POL | Filip Jania |
| 22 | DF | POL | Karol Kosiorek |

| No. | Pos. | Nation | Player |
|---|---|---|---|
| 23 | MF | POL | Jakub Gliwa |
| 24 | MF | POL | Franciszek Stępniewski |
| 25 | FW | UKR | Danyil Pylypchuk |
| 26 | MF | POL | Igor Owczarczyk |
| 27 | FW | POL | Igor Skrobała |
| 28 | MF | POL | Marcel Laszczyk |
| 29 | FW | POL | Szymon Piasta |
| 30 | MF | POL | Maciej Ruszkiewicz |
| 32 | DF | POL | Oskar Krakowiak |
| 39 | FW | AUT | Bekem Bicki |
| — | DF | POL | Daniel Foks |
| — | MF | POL | Jan Gawarecki |
| — | GK | POL | Nikodem Gimiński |
| — | MF | POL | Jakub Lis |
| — | MF | POL | Norbert Merchel |
| — | DF | POL | Franciszek Pollok |
| — | DF | POL | Oskar Putrzyński |

=== Notable former players ===
Players who have been capped in their national teams

- (Poland) Paweł Golański
- (Poland) Bartosz Kapustka
- (Poland) Michał Karbownik
- (Poland) Robert Lewandowski
- (Hungary) Dominik Nagy
- (Serbia) Ivan Obradović
- (Cape Verde) Hildeberto Pereira
- (Luxembourg) Chris Philipps
- (Poland) Sebastian Szymański
- (Uzbekistan) Jasurbek Yakhshiboev
