= 2021–22 Legia Warsaw season =

Legia Warsaw
2021–22 season
- Chairman: Dariusz Mioduski
- Manager: Czesław Michniewicz (until 25 October 2021); Marek Gołębiewski (25 October – 13 December 2021); Aleksandar Vuković (from 13 December 2021)
- Stadium: Stadion Wojska Polskiego
- Ekstraklasa: 10th
- Polish Cup: Semi-finals
- Polish Super Cup: Runners-up
- UEFA Champions League: Third qualifying round
- UEFA Europa League: Group stage
- Top goalscorer: League: Tomáš Pekhart (9); All: Mahir Emreli (11)
- Biggest win: 4-0 v Zagłębie Lubin (15 December 2021)
- Biggest defeat: 4-1 v Piast Gliwice (24 October 2021); 1-4 v Napoli (4 November 2021)
| Home colours | Away colours | Third colours |
- All statistics correct as of 15 March 2022.

The 2021–22 Legia Warsaw season was the club's 105th season of existence, and their 85th in the top flight of Polish football. In addition to the domestic league, Legia Warsaw participated in this season's editions of the Polish Cup, the Polish Super Cup, the UEFA Champions League and the UEFA Europa League.

On 21 November 2021, Legia equaled their record of their Ekstraklasa defeats in a row, following their ninth loss at Górnik Zabrze (the same number of defeats was in their 1936 season). On 13 February 2022, with a 1–0 defeat against Warta Poznań, Legia broke their infamous record of defeats in one Ekstraklasa season by losing their fourteenth game in the season.

== Players ==
=== First-team squad ===
Note: Flags indicate national team as defined under FIFA eligibility rules; some limited exceptions apply. Players may hold more than one non-FIFA nationality.

| No. | Pos. | Nation | Player |
|---|---|---|---|
| 1 | GK | POL | Artur Boruc |
| 2 | DF | CRO | Josip Juranović ▼ |
| 3 | DF | POL | Mateusz Hołownia |
| 4 | DF | POL | Mateusz Wieteska |
| 5 | DF | POR | Yuri Ribeiro ▲ |
| 6 | DF | SWE | Mattias Johansson ▲ |
| 7 | FW | KOS | Lirim Kastrati ▲ |
| 8 | MF | POR | André Martins ▼ |
| 9 | FW | CZE | Tomáš Pekhart |
| 11 | FW | AZE | Mahir Emreli ▲▼ |
| 13 | MF | POL | Paweł Wszołek (on loan from Union Berlin) ▲ |
| 14 | MF | UKR | Ihor Kharatin ▲ |
| 15 | GK | AUT | Richard Strebinger ▲ |
| 16 | MF | ALB | Jurgen Çelhaka ▲ |
| 17 | DF | POL | Maik Nawrocki (on loan from Werder Bremen) ▲ |
| 18 | MF | POL | Patryk Sokołowski ▲ |
| 19 | GK | POL | Wojciech Muzyk |
| 20 | FW | ALB | Ernest Muçi ▲ |
| 21 | FW | POR | Rafael Lopes |
| 22 | MF | POL | Kacper Skibicki |
| 23 | DF | ISR | Joel Abu Hanna ▲ |

| No. | Pos. | Nation | Player |
|---|---|---|---|
| 25 | DF | SRB | Filip Mladenović |
| 27 | MF | POR | Josué ▲ |
| 28 | FW | POL | Szymon Włodarczyk |
| 29 | DF | MRI | Lindsay Rose ▲ |
| 30 | FW | POL | Kacper Kostorz ▼ |
| 31 | GK | POL | Cezary Miszta |
| 39 | FW | POL | Maciej Rosołek ▼▲ |
| 55 | DF | POL | Artur Jędrzejczyk (captain) |
| 59 | GK | POL | Kacper Tobiasz ▼ |
| 60 | FW | POR | Rui Gomes ▲▼ |
| 63 | MF | POL | Jakub Kisiel ▼ |
| 64 | DF | UKR | Yehor Matsenko ▼ |
| 67 | MF | POL | Bartosz Kapustka |
| 77 | MF | SLO | Benjamin Verbič ▲ |
| 82 | MF | BRA | Luquinhas ▼ |
| 92 | MF | POL | Bartłomiej Ciepiela |
| 97 | FW | POL | Wiktor Kamiński |
| 99 | MF | POL | Bartosz Slisz |
| — | DF | RUS | Ramil Mustafajew ▲ |
| — | MF | POL | Kacper Skwierczyński |

°▲ symbol applies for players who joined the club during the season or in the pre-season term.
°▼ symbol applies for players who left the club during the season or in the summer transfer window term, but had made at least one regular-season appearance.

=== Out on loan ===
Note: Flags indicate national team as defined under FIFA eligibility rules; some limited exceptions apply. Players may hold more than one non-FIFA nationality.

| No. | Pos. | Nation | Player |
|---|---|---|---|
| — | GK | POL | Gabriel Kobylak (at Puszcza Niepolomice until 30 June 2022) |
| — | GK | POL | Mateusz Kochalski (at Radomiak Radom until 30 June 2022) |
| — | MF | UZB | Jasurbek Yakhshiboev (at Sheriff Tiraspol until 30 June 2022) |

| No. | Pos. | Nation | Player |
|---|---|---|---|
| — | FW | POL | Maciej Rosołek (at Arka Gdynia until 2 February 2022 – shortened) |
| 63 | MF | POL | Jakub Kisiel (at Stomil Olsztyn until 30 June 2022) |
| 59 | GK | POL | Kacper Tobiasz (at Stomil Olsztyn until 30 June 2022) |

== Transfers ==
=== In ===
| No. | Pos | Player | Transferred from | Fee | Date | Source |
|---|---|---|---|---|---|---|
| 11 | FW | (Azerbaijan) Mahir Emreli | (Azerbaijan) Qarabağ | Undisclosed | 8 June 2021 | |
| 17 | DF | (Poland) Maik Nawrocki | (Germany) Werder Bremen | Loan | 15 June 2021 | |
| 6 | DF | (Sweden) Mattias Johansson | (Turkey) Gençlerbirliği | Undisclosed | 21 June 2021 | |
| 27 | MF | (Portugal) Josué | (Israel) Hapoel Be'er Sheva | Undisclosed | 21 June 2021 | |
| 29 | DF | (Mauritius) Lindsay Rose | (Greece) Aris | Undisclosed | 4 July 2021 | |
| 5 | DF | (Portugal) Yuri Ribeiro | (England) Nottingham Forest | Undisclosed | 23 August 2021 | |
| 7 | FW | (Kosovo) Lirim Kastrati | (Croatia) Dinamo Zagreb | Undisclosed | 1 September 2021 | |
| 14 | FW | (Ukraine) Ihor Kharatin | (Hungary) Ferencvárosi | Undisclosed | 1 September 2021 | |
| 60 | FW | (Portugal) Rui Gomes | (Poland) Legia Warsaw II | Free transfer | 26 November 2021 | |
| 18 | MF | (Poland) Patryk Sokołowski | (Poland) Piast Gliwice | Undisclosed | 6 January 2022 | |
| 13 | MF | (Poland) Paweł Wszołek | (Germany) Union Berlin | Loan | 27 January 2022 | |
| | DF | (Russia) Ramil Mustafajew | (Poland) Stal Rzeszów | Undisclosed | 31 January 2022 | |
| 39 | FW | (Poland) Maciej Rosołek | (Poland) Arka Gdynia | End of loan | 2 February 2022 | |
| 15 | GK | (Austria) Richard Strebinger | (Austria) Rapid Wien | Undisclosed | 20 February 2022 | |
| 77 | MF | (Slovenia) Benjamin Verbič | (Ukraine) Dynamo Kyiv | Undisclosed | 14 March 2022 | |

=== Out ===
| No. | Pos | Player | Transferred to | Fee | Date | Source |
|---|---|---|---|---|---|---|
| | DF | (Poland) Ariel Mosór | (Poland) Piast Gliwice | Undisclosed | 9 June 2021 | |
| | DF | (Poland) Mateusz Cholewiak | (Poland) Górnik Zabrze | Undisclosed | 18 June 2021 | |
| | MF | (Poland) Radosław Cielemęcki | (Poland) Wisła Płock | Undisclosed | 22 June 2021 | |
| | DF | (Poland) Igor Lewczuk | (Poland) Znicz Pruszków | Free transfer | 5 July 2021 | |
| | DF | (Spain) Iñaki Astiz | (Poland) Legia Warsaw II | Free transfer | 12 July 2021 | |
| 2 | DF | (Croatia) Josip Juranović | (Scotland) Celtic | £2,500,000 | 21 August 2021 | |
| | MF | (Uzbekistan) Jasurbek Yakhshiboev | (Moldova) Sheriff Tiraspol | Loan | 30 August 2021 | |
| | MF | (Georgia (country)) Valerian Gvilia | (Poland) Raków Częstochowa | Free transfer | 31 August 2021 | |
| 39 | FW | (Poland) Maciej Rosołek | (Poland) Arka Gdynia | Loan | 1 September 2021 | |
| 30 | FW | (Poland) Kacper Kostorz | (Poland) Pogoń Szczecin | Undisclosed | 7 January 2022 | |
| 8 | MF | (Portugal) André Martins | (Israel) Hapoel Be'er Sheva | Undisclosed | 13 January 2022 | |
| 60 | FW | (Portugal) Rui Gomes | (Portugal) Covilhã | Undisclosed | 22 January 2022 | |
| 11 | FW | (Azerbaijan) Mahir Emreli | (Croatia) Dinamo Zagreb | Free transfer | 2 February 2022 | |
| 63 | MF | (Poland) Jakub Kisiel | (Poland) Stomil Olsztyn | Loan | 4 February 2022 | |
| 82 | MF | (Brazil) Luquinhas | (United States) New York Red Bulls | Undisclosed | 16 February 2022 | |
| | MF | (Ukraine) Yehor Matsenko | (Poland) Śląsk Wrocław II | Undisclosed | 17 February 2022 | |
| 59 | GK | (Poland) Kacper Tobiasz | (Poland) Stomil Olsztyn | Loan | 25 February 2022 | |

== Pre-season and friendlies ==
Legia had a pre-season camp in Austria that ran from June 16 to 24. Azerbaijani champion Neftçi Baku and the Russian FC Krasnodar were scheduled be Legia's rivals during the training camp in Austrian Leogang. Ultimately, instead of Neftçi PFK, Legia played against Ferencvárosi TC on June 20 in Kössen. During the national teams break in October, Legia played against their junior team, winning 4–1. Winter training camp was spent in Dubai, United Arab Emirates, with the last matches played in Książenice, Poland. During the national teams break for the UEFA play-offs, Legia played sparring with Widzew Łódź, which ultimately lost 3–2.

Win Draw Loss

| 17 June 2021 Friendly | Legia Warsaw | 5–0 | SK Bischofshofen | Bischofshofen, Austria |
| 18:45 (UTC+2) | | 90minut | | Stadium: Sportplatz Bischofshofen |

| 20 June 2021 Friendly | Legia Warsaw | 0–2 | Ferencvárosi | Kössen, Austria |
| (UTC+2) | | 90minut | Baturina 52'; Ćivić 80' | Stadium: Kaiserwinkl Arena |

| 23 June 2021 Friendly | Legia Warsaw | 1–1 | FC Krasnodar | Saalfelden, Austria |
| 15:00 (UTC+2) | | 90minut | | Stadium: SaalfeldenArena |

| 30 June 2021 Friendly | Legia Warsaw | 3–2 | Lechia Gdańsk | Warsaw, Poland |
| (UTC+2) | | 90minut | | Stadium: Stadion Wojska Polskiego |

| 3 July 2021 Friendly | Legia Warsaw | 2–0 | Jagiellonia Białystok | Kępa, Poland |
| 11:00 (UTC+2) | | 90minut | | Stadium: BoniFaCio Spa & Sport Resort Stadium |

| 14 October 2021 Friendly | Legia Warsaw | 4–1 | Legia Warsaw (juniors) | Książenice, Poland |
| 17:00 (UTC+2) | Emreli 16'; Johansson 30'; Kostorz 50'; Włodarczyk 56' | 90minut | Romanowski 55' | Stadium: Legia Training Center |

| 15 January 2022 Friendly | Legia Warsaw | 2–0 | Botev Plovdiv | Dubai, United Arab Emirates |
| 13:00 (UTC+1) | | Soccerway | | Stadium: Jebel Ali Centre of Excellence |

| 19 January 2022 Friendly | Legia Warsaw | 2–1 | FC Krasnodar | Dubai, United Arab Emirates |
| 13:00 (UTC+1) | Slisz (yellow card) 34'; Josué 54'; Wieteska 82' | Soccerway | Wanderson 12'; Krychowiak (yellow card) 24'; Borodin (yellow card) 70' | Stadium: Jebel Ali Centre of Excellence; Referee: M. Ivkovic |

| 20 January 2022 Friendly | Legia Warsaw | 2–0 | Riga FC | Dubai, United Arab Emirates |
| 13:00 (UTC+1) | | Soccerway | | Stadium: Jebel Ali Centre of Excellence |

| 29 January 2022 Friendly | Legia Warsaw | 4–0 | Radomiak Radom | Książenice, Poland |
| 13:00 (UTC+1) | Mladenović 11'; Muçi 20', 81'; Włodarczyk 23' | 90minut | | Stadium: Legia Training Center; Referee: Piotr Rzucidło (Warsaw) |

| 6 February 2022 Friendly | Legia Warsaw | 4–0 | GKS Bełchatów | Książenice, Poland |
| 12:05 (UTC+1) | Muçi 14'; Włodarczyk 45'; Strzałek 63'; Skwierczyński 90' | Soccerway; 90minut | | Stadium: Legia Training Center; Referee: Łukasz Szczech (Warsaw) |

| 20 February 2022 Friendly | Legia Warsaw | 1–2 | Wigry Suwałki | Warsaw, Poland |
| 13:00 (UTC+1) | Wszołek 25' (pen.) | 90minut | Lewandowski 23'; Gojko 24' | Stadium: Stadion Wojska Polskiego (side pitch); Attendance: 0 Referee: Piotr Rzucidło (Warsaw) |
Note: Played 45 + 30 + 30 minutes.

| 26 March 2022 Friendly | Legia Warsaw | 2–3 | Widzew Łódź | Książenice, Poland |
| 13:00 (UTC+1) | Sokołowski; Wszołek | Report | Terpiłowski; Guzdek; Kun 56' | Stadium: Legia Training Center; Attendance: 0 |

| 12 April 2022 Tour for Peace | Legia Warsaw | 1–3 | Dynamo Kyiv | Warsaw, Poland |
| 20:30 EET (UTC+2) | Strzałek 54' | | Buyalskyi 4'; Besedin 56', 71' | Stadium: Stadion Wojska Polskiego |

== Competitions ==
=== Overall record ===
| Competition | First match | Last match | Starting round | Final position | Record | | | | | | | |
| Competition | First match | Last match | Starting round | Final position | Pld | W | D | L | GF | GA | GD | Win % |
|---|---|---|---|---|---|---|---|---|---|---|---|---|
| Ekstraklasa | 25 July 2021 | May 2022 | Matchday 1 | | 23 | 8 | 1 | 14 | 25 | 33 | −8 | 34.78 |
| Polish Cup | 22 September 2021 | | Round of 64 | | 4 | 4 | 0 | 0 | 8 | 2 | +6 | 100.00 |
| Polish SuperCup | 17 July 2021 | | Final | Runners-up | 1 | 0 | 1 | 0 | 1 | 1 | +0 | 0.00 |
| UEFA Champions League | 7 July 2021 | 10 August 2021 | First qualifying round | Third qualifying round | 6 | 4 | 1 | 1 | 9 | 5 | +4 | 66.67 |
| UEFA Europa League | 19 August 2021 | 9 December 2021 | Play-off round | Group stage | 8 | 3 | 1 | 4 | 8 | 14 | −6 | 37.50 |
| Total | | | | | 42 | 19 | 4 | 19 | 51 | 55 | −4 | 45.24 |

Last updated: 9 December 2021
Source: 90minut.pl

=== Ekstraklasa ===
==== League table ====
| Pos | Team | Pld | W | D | L | GF | GA | GD | Pts |
|---|---|---|---|---|---|---|---|---|---|
| 8 | Górnik Zabrze | 34 | 13 | 8 | 13 | 55 | 55 | 0 | 47 |
| 9 | Cracovia | 34 | 12 | 10 | 12 | 40 | 42 | −2 | 46 |
| 10 | Legia Warsaw | 34 | 13 | 4 | 17 | 46 | 48 | −2 | 43 |
| 11 | Warta Poznań | 34 | 11 | 9 | 14 | 35 | 38 | −3 | 42 |
| 12 | Jagiellonia Białystok | 34 | 9 | 13 | 12 | 39 | 50 | −11 | 40 |

Source: ekstraklasa.org
Rules for classification: 1) Points; 2) Head-to-head points; 3) Head-to-head goal difference; 4) Goal difference; 5) Goals scored; 6) Number of wins; 7) Number of away wins; 8) Lower number of points based on yellow and red cards (red card = 3 points, yellow card = 1 point, sending-off = 3 points - including 1 point for first yellow card); 9) Fairplay ranking; 10) Draw. (Note: Head-to-head record is used only after all the matches between the teams in question have been played)

==== Results by round ====
| Round | 1 | 2 | 3 | 4 | 5 | 6 | 7 | 8 | 9 | 10 | 11 | 12 | 13 | 14 | 15 | 16 | 17 | 18 | 19 | 20 | 21 | 22 | 23 | 24 | 25 | 26 | 27 | 28 | 29 | 30 | 31 | 32 | 33 | 34 |
|---|---|---|---|---|---|---|---|---|---|---|---|---|---|---|---|---|---|---|---|---|---|---|---|---|---|---|---|---|---|---|---|---|---|---|
| Ground | H | A | H | A | H | A | A | H | H | A | H | A | H | H | A | H | A | A | H | A | H | A | H | H | A | A | H | A | H | A | A | H | A | H |
| Result | W | L | W | W | W | L | L | W | L | L | L | L | L | L | L | W | L | L | L | W | L | D | W | W | W | | | | | | | | | |
| Position | 4 | 10 | 12 (Note: The match was played at a later date, between Matchday 14 and 15. The 12th position is counted after the matches of Matchday 4 have been played on the regular date.) | 8 | 10 (Note: The match was played at a later date, between Matchday 25 and 26. The 10th position is counted after the matches of Matchday 5 have been played on the regular date.) | 13 | 16 | 12 | 15 | 15 | 17 | 17 | 17 | 17 | 17 | 16 | 16 | 18 | 17 | 16 | 17 | 17 | 16 | 13 | 12 | | | | | | | | | |

Updated to match(es) played on 9 March 2022. Source: https://www.ekstraklasa.org/tabela/sezon
A = Away; H = Home; W = Win; D = Draw; L = Loss; P = Postponed

==== Matches ====
| 24 July 2021 1 | Legia Warsaw | 1–0 | Wisła Płock | Warsaw |
| 20:00 CEST | Muçi 28'; Nawrocki (yellow card) 34'; Jędrzejczyk (yellow card) 82' | Report | Lagator (yellow card) 29'; Tomasik (yellow card) 31' | Stadium: Stadion Wojska Polskiego; Attendance: 10,260; Referee: Damian Kos |

| 31 July 2021 2 | Radomiak Radom | 3–1 | Legia Warsaw | Radom |
| 20:00 CEST | Rondón (yellow card) 7'; Nascimento (yellow card) 25' (yellow-red card) 84'; Radecki 46' (yellow card) 69'; Jakubik (yellow card) 67'; Angielski 80'; Sokół 90+6' | Report | Muçi (yellow card) 55'; Mladenović (red card) 67'; Nawrocki 82'; Slisz (yellow card) 84'; Josué (red card) 87'; Wieteska (yellow card) 90+1' | Stadium: Stadion Lekkoatletyczno-Piłkarski; Attendance: 3,950; Referee: Jarosław Przybył |

| 14 August 2021 4 | Warta Poznań | 0–2 | Legia Warsaw | Poznań |
| 20:00 CEST | Ivanov (yellow card) 23'; Matuszewski (yellow card) 28' | Report | Pekhart 39'; Lopes 49' (yellow card) 72' | Stadium: Stadion Warty Poznań; Attendance: 3,871; Referee: Piotr Lasyk |

| 28 August 2021 6 | Wisła Kraków | 1–0 | Legia Warsaw | Kraków |
| CEST | Brown 29'; Plewka (yellow card) 31' | Report | Pekhart (yellow card) 58'; Abu Hanna (yellow card) 65' | Stadium: Stadion im. Henryka Reymana; Attendance: 23,717; Referee: Zbigniew Dobrynin (Łódź) |

| 11 September 2021 7 | Śląsk Wrocław | 1–0 | Legia Warsaw | Wrocław |
| CEST | | Report | | Stadium: Stadion Wrocław |

| 18 September 2021 8 | Legia Warsaw | 3–1 | Górnik Łęczna | Warsaw |
| CEST | | Report | | Stadium: Stadion Wojska Polskiego |

| 25 September 2021 9 | Legia Warsaw | 2–3 | Raków Częstochowa | Warsaw |
| 20:00 CEST | Emreli 33'; Kharatin 70' | Report | Ivi 29' (pen.), 57'; Tudor 53' | Stadium: Stadion Wojska Polskiego; Attendance: 15,870; Referee: Jarosław Przybył |

| 2 October 2021 10 | Lechia Gdańsk | 3–1 | Legia Warsaw | Gdańsk |
| CET | | Report | | Stadium: Stadion Gdańsk |

| 17 October 2021 11 | Legia Warsaw | 0–1 | Lech Poznań | Warsaw |
| 17:30 CEST (UTC+02:00) | | Report | Ishak 54' | Stadium: Stadion Wojska Polskiego; Referee: Tomasz Musiał (Kraków) |

| 24 October 2021 12 | Piast Gliwice | 4–1 | Legia Warsaw | Gliwice |
| | | | | Stadium: Stadion Miejski |

| 31 October 2021 13 | Legia Warsaw | 0–2 | Pogoń Szczecin | Warsaw |
| 17:30 CET | | Report | | Stadium: Stadion Wojska Polskiego |

| 7 November 2021 14 | Legia Warsaw | 1–3 | Stal Mielec | Warsaw |
| 17:30 CET | | Report | | Stadium: Stadion Wojska Polskiego |

| 21 November 2021 15 | Górnik Zabrze | 3–2 | Legia Warsaw | Zabrze |
| 17:30 CET | | Report | | Stadium: Arena Zabrze |

| 28 November 2021 16 | Legia Warsaw | 1–0 | Jagiellonia Białystok | Warsaw |
| 17:30 CET | | Report | | Stadium: Stadion Wojska Polskiego |

| 5 December 2021 17 | Cracovia | 1–0 | Legia Warsaw | Kraków |
| 20:00 CET | | Report | | Stadium: Stadion Cracovii im. Józefa Piłsudskiego |

| 12 December 2021 18 | Wisła Płock | 1–0 | Legia Warsaw | Płock |
| 15:00 CET | | Report | | Stadium: Stadion im. Kazimierza Górskiego |

| 15 December 2021 3 | Legia Warsaw | 4–0 | Zagłębie Lubin | Warsaw |
| CEST | Lopes 25', 38'; Pekhart 54'; Hołownia 58' | | | Stadium: Stadion Wojska Polskiego |
Note: At the original date (7 August 2021, 20:00), canceled at the request of Legia.

| 19 December 2021 19 | Legia Warsaw | 0–3 | Radomiak Radom | Warsaw |
| 17:30 CET | | Report | | Stadium: Stadion Wojska Polskiego |

| 4 February 2022 20 | Zagłębie Lubin | 1–3 | Legia Warsaw | Lubin |
| 20:30 CET | Szysz 48' | Report | Rosołek 40'; Kopacz 44' (o.g.); Wszołek 88' | Stadium: Stadion Miejski; Attendance: 5,237; Referee: Piotr Lasyk (Bytom) |

| 13 February 2022 21 | Legia Warsaw | 0–1 | Warta Poznań | Warsaw |
| 17:30 CET | Boruc (red card) 72' | Report | Szymonowicz 23'; Zreľák (penalty missed) 75 | Stadium: Stadion Wojska Polskiego; Attendance: 12,137; Referee: Łukasz Kuźma (Białystok) |

| 19 February 2022 22 | Bruk-Bet Termalica Nieciecza | 0–0 | Legia Warsaw | Nieciecza |
| 20:00 CET | | Report | | Stadium: Stadion Sportowy Bruk-Bet Termalica; Attendance: 4,564; Referee: Damian Sylwestrzak (Wrocław) |

| 25 February 2022 23 | Legia Warsaw | 2–1 | Wisła Kraków | Warsaw |
| 20:30 CET | Pekhart 8'; Josué (yellow card) 85'; Wieteska 90+4' | Report | Colley (yellow card) 35'; Hufi (yellow card) 77'; Gruszkowski 79'; Frydrych (yellow card) 90+5' (red card) 90+10' | Stadium: Stadion Wojska Polskiego; Attendance: 14,612; Referee: Piotr Lasyk (Bytom) |

| 7 March 2022 24 | Legia Warsaw | 1–0 | Śląsk Wrocław | Warsaw |
| 19:00 CEST | Çelhaka (yellow card) 49'; Nawrocki (yellow card) 61'; Wszołek 69' | Report | | Stadium: Stadion Wojska Polskiego; Attendance: 8,677; Referee: Tomasz Musiał (Kraków) |

| 11 March 2022 25 | Górnik Łęczna | 0–1 | Legia Warsaw | Łęczna |
| 20:30 CET | Gąska (yellow card) 60'; Drewniak (yellow card) 78' | Report | Johansson (yellow card) 38'; Çelhaka (yellow card) 42'; Rosołek 67' | Stadium: Stadion Górnika Łęczna; Attendance: 6,006; Referee: Szymon Marciniak (Płock) |

| 15 March 2022 5 | Legia Warsaw | 4–1 | Bruk-Bet Termalica Nieciecza | Warsaw |
| 18:45 CET | Rosołek (yellow card) 20'; Josué 26'; Pekhart 37', 72'; Wieteska 45'; Slisz (yellow card) 89' | | Putivtsev (yellow card) 44', (goal) 90' | Stadium: Stadion Wojska Polskiego; Attendance: 9,437; Referee: Jarosław Przybył (Kluczbork) |
Note: At the original date (22 August 2021, 20:00), canceled at the request of Legia. The second date of the match (8 February 2022, 20:30) has also been canceled.

| 19 March 2022 26 | Raków Częstochowa | 1–1 | Legia Warsaw | Częstochowa |
| 15:00 CET | Papanikolaou (yellow card) 26' (yellow-red card) 83'; Lederman (yellow card) 67'; Ivi 71' (pen.) | Report | Rosołek (yellow card) 24'; Wszołek 45'; Wieteska (yellow card) 57'; Lopes (yellow card) 90' | Stadium: Miejski Stadion Piłkarski "Raków"; Attendance: 5,200; Referee: Szymon Marciniak (Płock) |

=== Polish Cup ===
| 22 September 2021 Round of 64 | Wigry Suwałki | 1–3 | Legia Warsaw | Suwałki |
| 17:30 CEST (UTC+02:00) | Michalski 40' | Łączy nas piłka 90minut | Kostorz 42'; Kastrati 65'; Emreli 80' | Stadium: Stadion Miejski; Attendance: 2,905; Referee: Krzysztof Jakubik (Siedlce) |

| 28 October 2021 Round of 32 | Świt Szczecin | 0–1 | Legia Warsaw | Szczecin |
| 14:00 CEST (UTC+02:00) | | Łączy nas piłka 90minut | Rose 35' | Stadium: Stadion MOSRiR; Attendance: 986; Referee: Dominik Sulikowski (Gdańsk) |

| 1 December 2021 Round of 16 | Motor Lublin | 1–2 | Legia Warsaw | Lublin |
| 20:00 CET (UTC+01:00) | Fidziukiewicz 14' | Report | Luquinhas 56'; Włodarczyk 73' | Stadium: Arena Lublin; Attendance: 14,914; Referee: Łukasz Kuźma (Białystok) |

| 2 March 2022 Quarter-finals | Legia Warsaw | 2–0 | Górnik Łęczna | Warsaw |
| 20:45 CET (UTC+01:00) | Josué 22'; Muçi 86' | Report | | Stadium: Stadion Wojska Polskiego; Attendance: 6,529; Referee: Damian Kos (Gdańsk) |

=== Polish SuperCup ===
| 17 July 2021 Final | Legia Warsaw | 1–1 (3–4 p) | Raków Częstochowa | Warsaw |
| 20:00 CEST (UTC+02:00) | Emreli 90+3' | Report | Tudor 10' | Stadium: Stadion Wojska Polskiego; Attendance: 10,870; Referee: Damian Sylwestrzak (Wrocław) |
| | Penalties |
| | Pekhart (penalty scored); Kapustka (penalty missed); Emreli (penalty missed); Juranović (penalty scored); Mladenović (penalty scored) | | Petrášek (penalty scored); Ivi López (penalty scored); Arsenić (penalty missed); Arak (penalty scored); Rundić (penalty scored) |

=== UEFA Champions League ===
==== First qualifying round ====
| 7 July 2021 First leg | Bodø/Glimt (Norway) | 2–3 | Legia Warsaw | Bodø, Norway |
| 18:00 | Botheim 45+1'; Pernambuco 78' | Report | Luquinhas 2'; Emreli 41', 61' | Stadium: Aspmyra Stadion; Attendance: 2,283; Referee: Juxhin Xhaja (Albania) |

| 14 July 2021 Second leg | Legia Warsaw | 2–0 (5–2 agg.) | (Norway) Bodø/Glimt | Warsaw, Poland |
| 20:00 | Luquinhas 40'; Pekhart 90+5' | Report | | Stadium: Stadion Wojska Polskiego; Attendance: 17,473; Referee: Aristotelis Diamantopoulos (Greece) |

==== Second qualifying round ====
| 21 July 2021 First leg | Legia Warsaw | 2–1 | (Estonia) Flora | Warsaw, Poland |
| 21:00 | Kapustka 3'; Lopes 90+1' | Report | Sappinen 53' | Stadium: Stadion Wojska Polskiego; Attendance: 16,721; Referee: Vitali Meshkov (Russia) |

| 27 July 2021 Second leg | Flora (Estonia) | 0–1 (1–3 agg.) | Legia Warsaw | Tallinn, Estonia |
| 18:00 (19:00 EEST) | | Report | Lopes 67' | Stadium: A. Le Coq Arena; Attendance: 3,691; Referee: Anastasios Papapetrou (Greece) |

==== Third qualifying round ====
| 4 August 2021 First leg | Dinamo Zagreb (Croatia) | 1–1 | Legia Warsaw | Zagreb, Croatia |
| 20:00 | Jakić (yellow card) 27'; Petković 60' | Report | Slisz (yellow card) 7'; Jędrzejczyk (yellow card) 44'; Martins (yellow card) 72'; Muçi 82' | Stadium: Stadion Maksimir; Referee: Antonio Mateu Lahoz (Spain) |

| 10 August 2021 Second leg | Legia Warsaw | 0–1 (1–2 agg.) | (Croatia) Dinamo Zagreb | Warsaw, Poland |
| 21:00 | Wieteska (yellow card) 28'; Jędrzejczyk (yellow card) 28'; Josué (yellow card) 72'; Juranović (yellow card) 89' | Report | Franjić 20'; Perić (yellow card) 45+2'; Oršić (yellow card) 76'; Mišić (yellow card) 76'; Gojak (yellow card) 90+4' | Stadium: Stadion Wojska Polskiego; Attendance: 26,769; Referee: Benoît Bastien (France) |

=== UEFA Europa League ===
==== Play-off round ====
| 19 August 2021 First leg | Slavia Prague (Czech Republic) | 2–2 | Legia Warsaw | Prague, Czech Republic |
| 19:00 | Bah 33'; Masopust 45+3' | Report | Emreli 20'; Juranović 37' | Stadium: Sinobo Stadium; Referee: Felix Zwayer (Germany) |

| 26 August 2021 Second leg | Legia Warsaw | 2–1 (4–3 agg.) | (Czech Republic) Slavia Prague | Warsaw, Poland |
| 21:00 | Emreli 59', 70' | Report | Ekpai 45' | Stadium: Stadion Wojska Polskiego; Referee: Artur Soares Dias (Portugal) |

==== Group stage ====
| Pos | Team | Pld | W | D | L | GF | GA | GD | Pts | Qualification | SPM | NAP | LEI | LEG |
|---|---|---|---|---|---|---|---|---|---|---|---|---|---|---|
| 1 | (Russia) Spartak Moscow | 6 | 3 | 1 | 2 | 10 | 9 | +1 | 10 (Note: Head–to–head points: Spartak Moscow 6, Napoli 0.) | Advance to round of 16 | — | 2–1 | 3–4 | 0–1 |
| 2 | (Italy) Napoli | 6 | 3 | 1 | 2 | 15 | 10 | +5 | 10 | Advance to knockout round play-offs | 2–3 | — | 3–2 | 3–0 |
| 3 | (England) Leicester City | 6 | 2 | 2 | 2 | 12 | 11 | +1 | 8 | Transfer to Europa Conference League | 1–1 | 2–2 | — | 3–1 |
| 4 | (Poland) Legia Warsaw | 6 | 2 | 0 | 4 | 4 | 11 | −7 | 6 | | 0–1 | 1–4 | 1–0 | — |

Source: UEFA
Rules for classification: Group stage tiebreakers
Notes:

| 15 September 2021 (Note: All three home matches of Spartak Moscow are being played on Wednesdays instead of Thursdays to avoid scheduling conflicts with the home matches of Lokomotiv Moscow on the same day, as Lokomotiv Moscow (cup winners) have higher scheduling priority over Spartak Moscow (league runners-up) in the Europa League.) 1 | Spartak Moscow (Russia) | 0–1 | Legia Warsaw | Moscow, Russia |
| 16:30 (17:30 MSK) | | Report | Kastrati 90+1' | Stadium: Otkritie Arena; Attendance: 6,832; Referee: Nikola Dabanović (Montenegro) |

| 30 September 2021 2 | Legia Warsaw | 1–0 | (England) Leicester City | Warsaw, Poland |
| 18:45 | Emreli 31' | Report | | Stadium: Stadion Wojska Polskiego; Referee: Ivan Bebek (Croatia) |

| 21 October 2021 3 | Napoli (Italy) | 3–0 | Legia Warsaw | Naples, Italy |
| 21:00 | Juan Jesus (yellow card) 13'; Manolas (yellow card) 44'; Insigne 76'; Osimhen 80'; Politano 90+5' | Report | Johansson (yellow card) 73' | Stadium: Stadio Diego Armando Maradona, Naples; Referee: Carlos del Cerro Grande (Spain) |

| 4 November 2021 4 | Legia Warsaw | 1–4 | (Italy) Napoli | Warsaw, Poland |
| 18:45 | Emreli 10'; Jędrzejczyk (yellow card) 68'; Miszta (yellow card) 73'; Josué (yellow card) 75' | Report | Zieliński 51' (pen.); Elmas (yellow card) 54'; Mertens 75' (pen.); Lozano 79'; Ounas 90' | Stadium: Stadion Wojska Polskiego; Referee: Lawrence Visser (Belgium) |

| 25 November 2021 5 | Leicester City (England) | 3–1 | Legia Warsaw | Leicester, England |
| 21:00 (20:00 GMT) | Daka 11'; Maddison 21'; Ndidi 33'; Thomas (yellow card) 61'; Albrighton (yellow card) 89' | Report | Emreli (penalty missed) 26'; Mladenović 26', (yellow card) 39'; Wieteska (yellow card) 48'; Jędrzejczyk (yellow card) 87' | Stadium: King Power Stadium; Referee: Deniz Aytekin (Germany) |

| 9 December 2021 6 | Legia Warsaw | 0–1 | (Russia) Spartak Moscow | Warsaw, Poland |
| 18:45 CET (UTC+1) | Martins (yellow card) 24'; Josué (yellow card) 26'; Slisz (yellow card) 44'; Kastrat (yellow card) 61'; Wieteska (yellow card) 81'; Pekhart (penalty missed) 90 | Report | Bakaev 17'; Promes (yellow card) 34'; Dzhikiya (yellow card) 61'; Melkadze (yellow card) 80' | Stadium: Stadion Wojska Polskiego; Referee: Matej Jug (Slovenia) |

== Squad statistics ==
=== Goal scorers ===
As of 9 December 2021

| Rank | Number | Position | Player | Ekstraklasa | Polish Cup | Polish SuperCup | UEFA Champions League | UEFA Europa League | Total |
|---|---|---|---|---|---|---|---|---|---|
| 1 | 11 | FW | (Azerbaijan) Mahir Emreli | 2 | 1 | 1 | 2 | 5 | 11 |
| 2 | 20 | FW | (Albania) Ernest Muçi | 4 | 0 | 0 | 1 | 0 | 5 |
| 3 | 9 | FW | (Czech Republic) Tomáš Pekhart | 2 | 0 | 0 | 1 | 0 | 3 |
| 3 | 21 | FW | (Portugal) Rafael Lopes | 1 | 0 | 0 | 2 | 0 | 3 |
| 5 | 4 | DF | (Poland) Mateusz Wieteska | 2 | 0 | 0 | 0 | 0 | 2 |
| 5 | 7 | FW | (Kosovo) Lirim Kastrati | 0 | 1 | 0 | 0 | 1 | 2 |
| 5 | 82 | FW | (Brazil) Luquinhas | 0 | 0 | 0 | 2 | 0 | 2 |
| 8 | 6 | DF | (Sweden) Mattias Johansson | 1 | 0 | 0 | 0 | 0 | 1 |
| 8 | 14 | MF | (Ukraine) Ihor Kharatin | 1 | 0 | 0 | 0 | 0 | 1 |
| 8 | 17 | DF | (Poland) Maik Nawrocki | 1 | 0 | 0 | 0 | 0 | 1 |
| 8 | 25 | DF | (Serbia) Filip Mladenović | 0 | 0 | 0 | 0 | 1 | 1 |
| 8 | 29 | DF | (Mauritius) Lindsay Rose | 0 | 1 | 0 | 0 | 0 | 1 |
| 8 | 30 | FW | (Poland) Kacper Kostorz | 0 | 1 | 0 | 0 | 0 | 1 |
| 8 | 67 | MF | (Poland) Bartosz Kapustka | 0 | 0 | 0 | 1 | 0 | 1 |
| 8 | – | DF | (Croatia) Josip Juranović | 0 | 0 | 0 | 0 | 1 | 1 |
| Own goals | | | | 1 | 0 | 0 | 0 | 0 | 1 |
| Total | | | | 15 | 6 | 1 | 9 | 8 | 39 |
