= 2026–27 Polish Cup =

STS Puchar Polski

Tournament details
- Country: Poland
- Dates: 5 August 2026 – 2 May 2027
- Teams: 70

Tournament statistics
- Matches played: 37
- Goals scored: 122 (3.3 per match)
- Top goal scorer(s): Wojciech Jakubik; Szymon Pukała (3 goals each)
- All statistics correct as of 16 September 2026.

The 2026–27 Polish Cup (Polish: Puchar Polski [ˌpuxar ˈpɔlskʲi]) is the 73rd season of the annual Polish football knockout tournament. The competition will begin on 5 August 2026 with the preliminary round and will end on 2 May 2027 with the final match at the Stadion Narodowy in Warsaw. The Polish Cup is considered the second-most important club title in Polish football after the Ekstraklasa competition. The competition is organised by the Polish Football Association (PZPN).

On 19 August 2025, PZPN announced that the Polish Cup would be sponsored by STS for next three seasons, making the official name STS Puchar Polski. Winners of the competition will qualify for 2027–28 UEFA Europa League play-off round.

The defending champions is Górnik Zabrze.

Times up to 24 October 2026 and from 28 March 2027 are CEST (UTC+2). Times from 25 October 2026 to 27 March 2027 are CET (UTC+1).

== Participating teams ==
| Teams starting the competition from the round of 32 | Teams starting the competition from the first round | | | Teams starting the competition from the preliminary round | |
| 2026–27 UEFA club competitions 5 teams | 2025–26 Ekstraklasa; 13 teams (teams not participating in 2026–27 UEFA club competitions) | 2025–26 I liga 14 teams (from position 1–14) | Winners of 16 regional cup competitions 16 teams | 2025–26 I liga 4 teams (from position 15–18) | 2025–26 II liga 18 teams |
| Lech Poznań (round of 32); Górnik Zabrze; Jagiellonia Białystok; Raków Częstochowa; GKS Katowice (round of 32) | Legia Warsaw (first round); Zagłębie Lubin (first round); Wisła Płock; Pogoń Szczecin (first round); Radomiak Radom (round of 32); Korona Kielce (round of 32); Motor Lublin (round of 32); Cracovia (first round); Widzew Łódź (first round); Piast Gliwice (round of 32); Lechia Gdańsk (round of 32); Arka Gdynia (round of 32); Bruk-Bet Termalica Nieciecza | Wisła Kraków (first round); Śląsk Wrocław (round of 32); Wieczysta Kraków (first round); Chrobry Głogów; ŁKS Łódź (first round); Polonia Warsaw; Ruch Chorzów; Miedź Legnica (first round); Puszcza Niepołomice (round of 32); Polonia Bytom (round of 32); Pogoń Grodzisk Mazowiecki (first round); Odra Opole; Stal Rzeszów; Stal Mielec (first round) | Górnik Polkowice (dolnośląskie) (first round); Chemik Bydgoszcz (kujawsko-pomorskie) (first round); Avia Świdnik (lubelskie); Lechia Zielona Góra (lubuskie) (first round); Widzew Łódź II (łódzkie) (first round); Beskid Andrychów (małopolskie) (first round); Wisła Płock II (mazowieckie) (first round); MKS Kluczbork (opolskie) (first round); Siarka Tarnobrzeg (podkarpackie); Wigry Suwałki (podlaskie) (first round); Wikęd Luzino (pomorskie) (first round); Górnik Zabrze II (śląskie) (first round); Korona Kielce II (świętokrzyskie) (first round); Sokół Ostróda (warmińsko-mazurskie) (first round); Polonia Środa Wielkopolska (wielkopolskie); Kluczevia Stargard (zachodniopomorskie) (first round) | Pogoń Siedlce (round of 32); Znicz Pruszków (round of 32); Górnik Łęczna; GKS Tychy | Unia Skierniewice (preliminary round); Warta Poznań (preliminary round); Olimpia Grudziądz (round of 32); Podbeskidzie Bielsko-Biała (first round); Śląsk Wrocław II (round of 32); Sandecja Nowy Sącz (first round); Podhale Nowy Targ (round of 32); Chojniczanka Chojnice (preliminary round); Rekord Bielsko-Biała (preliminary round); Stal Stalowa Wola (preliminary round); Hutnik Kraków (preliminary round); Świt Szczecin (preliminary round); Resovia Rzeszów (first round); Sokół Kleczew; Zagłębie Sosnowiec (preliminary round); KKS 1925 Kalisz (preliminary round); ŁKS Łódź II (preliminary round); GKS Jastrzębie (preliminary round) |

== Prize money ==
The PZPN Board of Directors determined the size of the prizes.

| Round reached | Amount |
|---|---|
| First round | regional cup winner: 50,000 PLN remainder teams: 15,000 PLN |
| Round of 32 | 45,000 PLN |
| Round of 16 | 90,000 PLN |
| Quarter-finals | 190,000 PLN |
| Semi-finals | 380,000 PLN |
| Final | 1,000,000 PLN |
| Winner | 5,000,000 PLN |

== Round and draw dates ==
| Round | Draw date | Number of teams | Date of matches | Teams entered for the competition |
|---|---|---|---|---|
| Preliminary round | None | 70 → 59 | 5 August 2026 | • 2025–26 I liga teams from positions 15–18, • 2025–26 II liga teams. |
| First round | 6 August 2026 | 59 → 32 | 1–15 September 2026 | • 2025–26 Ekstraklasa teams not participating in 2026–27 UEFA club competitions, • top 14 2025–26 I liga teams, • 16 winners of the regional cups. |
| Round of 32 | 17 September 2026 | 32 → 16 | 27–29 October 2026 | • 2025–26 Ekstraklasa teams participating in 2026–27 UEFA club competitions. |
| Round of 16 | 30 October 2026 | 16 → 8 | 1–3 December 2026 | None |
| Quarter-finals | TBD | 8 → 4 | 2–4 March 2027 | None |
| Semi-finals | TBD | 4 → 2 | 6–8 April 2027 | None |
| Final | None | 2 | 2 May 2027 | None |

== Preliminary round ==
The matches were played on 5 August 2026. Participating in this round were the four lowest-ranked 2025–26 I liga teams (from positions 14–18) and 18 2025–26 II liga teams. According to the competition regulations, the matches were played under the following pairing scheme:

- The 15th-placed team of the 2025–26 I liga season hosted the 18th-placed team of the 2025–26 II liga season,
- The 16th-placed team of the I liga season hosted the 17th-placed team of the II liga season,
- The 17th-placed team of the I liga season hosted the 16th-placed team of the II liga season,
- The 18th-placed team of the I liga season hosted the 15th-placed team of the II liga season,
- The 1st-placed team of the II liga season hosted the 14th-placed team of the II liga season,
- The 2nd-placed team of the II liga season hosted the 13th-placed team of the II liga season,
- The 3rd-placed team of the II liga season hosted the 12th-placed team of the II liga season,
- The 4th-placed team of the II liga season hosted the 11th-placed team of the II liga season,
- The 5th-placed team of the II liga season hosted the 10th-placed team of the II liga season,
- The 6th-placed team of the II liga season hosted the 9th-placed team of the II liga season,
- The 7th-placed team of the II liga season hosted the 8th-placed team of the II liga season.

Number of teams per 2025–26 season tier still in competition
| 2025–26 Ekstraklasa | 2025–26 I liga | 2025–26 II liga | 2025–26 Regional cup winners | Total |
|---|---|---|---|---|
| 18 / 18 | 18 / 18 | 18 / 18 | 16 / 16 | 70 / 70 |

The number in brackets indicates the league level the club is competing in during the 2026–27 season.

| Team 1 | Score | Team 2 |
|---|---|---|
| Pogoń Siedlce (2) | 3–0 (w/o) | GKS Jastrzębie |
5 August 2026
| Znicz Pruszków (3) | 3–1 | ŁKS Łódź II (4) |
| Górnik Łęczna (3) | 2–0 | KKS 1925 Kalisz (4) |
| GKS Tychy (3) | 1–0 | Zagłębie Sosnowiec (4) |
| Unia Skierniewice (2) | 2–2 (a.e.t.) (1–4 p) | Sokół Kleczew (3) |
| Warta Poznań (2) | 0–1 | Resovia Rzeszów (3) |
| Olimpia Grudziądz (3) | 5–3 (a.e.t.) | Świt Szczecin (3) |
| Podbeskidzie Bielsko-Biała (2) | 2–0 | Hutnik Kraków (3) |
| Śląsk Wrocław II (3) | 3–2 | Stal Stalowa Wola (3) |
| Sandecja Nowy Sącz (3) | 3–0 | Rekord Bielsko-Biała (3) |
| Podhale Nowy Targ (3) | 2–0 | Chojniczanka Chojnice (3) |

| Pogoń Siedlce | 3–0 (w/o) | GKS Jastrzębie |
| | Report |
Note: GKS Jastrzębie has withdrawn from the competition.

| 5 August 2026 | Znicz Pruszków | 3–1 | ŁKS Łódź II | Pruszków |
| 16:00 CEST (UTC+02:00) | Kosmalski 7'; Barnowski 42'; Nadolski 90' | Report | Jurkiewicz 29' | Stadium: Stadion Znicza Pruszków; Attendance: 360; Referee: Łukasz Dobrzyński (Olsztyn) |

| 5 August 2026 | Podbeskidzie Bielsko-Biała | 2–0 | Hutnik Kraków | Dankowice |
| 16:00 CEST (UTC+02:00) | Twardosz 73', 88' | Report | | Stadium: Stadion LKS Pasjonat; Attendance: 510; Referee: Karol Wójcik (Siedlce) |

| 5 August 2026 | Śląsk Wrocław II | 3–2 | Stal Stalowa Wola | Wrocław |
| 16:00 CEST (UTC+02:00) | Kobelczuk 13'; Kamiński 73'; Zajączkowski 90' | Report | Chrzanowski 37'; Śliwa 56' | Stadium: Oporowska Stadium; Attendance: 233; Referee: Dorian Skwara (Łódź) |

| 5 August 2026 | Podhale Nowy Targ | 2–0 | Chojniczanka Chojnice | Nowy Targ |
| 16:30 CEST (UTC+02:00) | Kołtański 88'; Kubik 90' | Report | | Stadium: Stadion Miejski; Attendance: 450; Referee: Arkadiusz Nestorowicz (Biała Podlaska) |

| 5 August 2026 | Olimpia Grudziądz | 5–3 (a.e.t.) | Świt Szczecin | Świecie |
| 17:00 CEST (UTC+02:00) | Zbiciak 48'; Siemaszko 61'; Frelek 80' (pen.); Rogala 109' (o.g.); Fietz 118' | Report | Gorgon 16'; Kapelusz 30'; Wojdak 88' (pen.) | Stadium: Stadion Miejski; Attendance: 180; Referee: Adam Sekuterski (Łódź) |

| 5 August 2026 | Warta Poznań | 0–1 | Resovia Rzeszów | Środa Wielkopolska |
| 17:30 CEST (UTC+02:00) | | Report | Silný 28' | Stadium: Stadion Średzki; Attendance: 400; Referee: Piotr Pazdecki (Koszalin) |

| 5 August 2026 | Górnik Łęczna | 2–0 | KKS 1925 Kalisz | Łęczna |
| 18:00 CEST (UTC+02:00) | Walski 9' (pen.); Stadnicki 53' | Report | | Stadium: Stadion Miejski; Attendance: 1,033; Referee: Jan Chmielak (Warsaw) |

| 5 August 2026 | Sandecja Nowy Sącz | 3–0 | Rekord Bielsko-Biała | Nowy Sącz |
| 18:00 CEST (UTC+02:00) | Kolar 24'; Kowalik 78'; Danek 86' (pen.) | Report | | Stadium: Stadion Sandecji; Attendance: 5,256; Referee: Dawid Muc (Radom) |

| 5 August 2026 | GKS Tychy | 1–0 | Zagłębie Sosnowiec | Tychy |
| 19:00 CEST (UTC+02:00) | Lewandowski 37' | Report | | Stadium: Stadion Miejski; Attendance: 3,460; Referee: Leszek Lewandowski (Zabrze) |

| 5 August 2026 | Unia Skierniewice | 2–2 (a.e.t.) (1–4 p) | Sokół Kleczew | Skierniewice |
| 19:45 CEST (UTC+02:00) | Sabiłło 61'; Makuch 120' | Report | Woliński 37' (o.g.); Adamski 93' | Stadium: Stadion Miejski; Attendance: 1,465; Referee: Paweł Maćkowiak (Szczecin) |
| | Penalties |
| | Gąska (penalty scored); Toporkiewicz (penalty missed); Szmyd (penalty missed) | | (penalty scored) Śpiewak; (penalty scored) Dudziński; (penalty scored) Antczak; (penalty scored) Tkaczyk |

== First round ==
The draw for this round was conducted at the headquarters of Telewizja Polska on 6 August 2026. The matches were played on 1–15 September 2026. Participating in this round were the 11 winners from the preliminary round, 13 teams from the 2025–26 Ekstraklasa that did not qualify for 2026–27 UEFA club competitions, the top 14 teams from the 2025–26 I liga, and the 16 winners of the 2025–26 regional cup competitions. Matches were hosted by the team playing in a lower division in the 2026–27 season or by the team drawn first in the case of a match between clubs from the same division.

Number of teams per 2025–26 season tier still in competition
| 2025–26 Ekstraklasa | 2025–26 I liga | 2025–26 II liga | 2025–26 Regional cup winners | Total |
|---|---|---|---|---|
| 18 / 18 | 18 / 18 | 7 / 18 | 16 / 16 | 59 / 70 |

The number in brackets indicates the league level the club is competing in during the 2026–27 season.

| Team 1 | Score | Team 2 |
1 September 2026
| Korona Kielce II (4) | 0–1 | Radomiak Radom (1) |
| Chemik Bydgoszcz (4) | 0–3 | Piast Gliwice (1) |
| Kluczevia Stargard (4) | 2–3 (a.e.t.) | Pogoń Siedlce (2) |
| Wigry Suwałki (4) | 1–5 | Bruk-Bet Termalica Nieciecza (2) |
| Wisła Płock II (4) | 0–2 | Puszcza Niepołomice (2) |
| MKS Kluczbork (4) | 1–2 | Lechia Gdańsk (2) |
| Polonia Środa Wielkopolska (4) | 3–2 | Sandecja Nowy Sącz (3) |
| Siarka Tarnobrzeg (4) | 3–2 | Zagłębie Lubin (1) |
| Motor Lublin (1) | 3–0 | Legia Warsaw (1) |
| Odra Opole (2) | 2–1 | Wisła Kraków (1) |
| Stal Rzeszów (2) | 3–0 | Podbeskidzie Bielsko-Biała (2) |
| Podhale Nowy Targ (3) | 3–1 | Pogoń Grodzisk Mazowiecki (2) |
2 September 2026
| Lechia Zielona Góra (3) | 0–2 | Ruch Chorzów (2) |
| Górnik Polkowice (4) | 0–1 | Polonia Warsaw (2) |
| Beskid Andrychów (5) | 1–3 | Śląsk Wrocław II (3) |
| Wikęd Luzino (4) | 2–3 | Wisła Płock (1) |
| Sokół Ostróda (5) | 1–2 | Sokół Kleczew (3) |
| Górnik Zabrze II | 3–4 | Olimpia Grudziądz (3) |
| Widzew Łódź (1) | 0–1 | Korona Kielce (1) |
| Znicz Pruszków (3) | 1–1 (a.e.t.) (4–3 p) | Cracovia (1) |
| Górnik Łęczna (3) | 3–3 (a.e.t.) (4–3 p) | Stal Mielec (2) |
| Miedź Legnica (2) | 0–1 | Chrobry Głogów (2) |
| Resovia Rzeszów (3) | 0–4 | Arka Gdynia (2) |
3 September 2026
| Avia Świdnik (3) | 3–1 | Wieczysta Kraków (1) |
| Śląsk Wrocław (1) | 2–1 | Pogoń Szczecin (1) |
| GKS Tychy (3) | 1–0 | ŁKS Łódź (2) |
15 September 2026
| Widzew Łódź II (4) | 1–2 | Polonia Bytom (2) |

| 1 September 2026 | Korona Kielce II | 0–1 | Radomiak Radom | Kielce |
| 14:30 CEST (UTC+02:00) | | Report | Afonso 31' | Stadium: Korona Kielce Stadium; Attendance: 698; Referee: Daniel Stefański (Bydgoszcz) |

| 1 September 2026 | Podhale Nowy Targ | 3–1 | Pogoń Grodzisk Mazowiecki | Nowy Targ |
| 15:30 CEST (UTC+02:00) | Talar 26'; Voško 50'; Surzyn 54' | Report | Oshafi 9' | Stadium: Stadion Miejski; Attendance: 524; Referee: Leszek Lewandowski (Zabrze) |

| 1 September 2026 | Chemik Bydgoszcz | 0–3 | Piast Gliwice | Bydgoszcz |
| 16:00 CEST (UTC+02:00) | | Report | Karbowski 1' (o.g.); Kucharski 67'; Félix 77' (pen.) | Stadium: Czesław Kobus Stadium; Attendance: 940; Referee: Mateusz Stępniak (Gdańsk) |

| 1 September 2026 | Kluczevia Stargard | 2–3 (a.e.t.) | Pogoń Siedlce | Stargard |
| 16:00 CEST (UTC+02:00) | Rian 45' (pen.); Yefimenko 84' | Report | Dzięcioł 52'; Szczytniewski 90+4'; Kendzia 120' | Stadium: Stadion Kluczevii; Attendance: 600; Referee: Dorian Skwara (Łódź) |

| 1 September 2026 | Wisła Płock II | 0–2 | Puszcza Niepołomice | Płock |
| 16:00 CEST (UTC+02:00) | | Report | Trubeha 68'; Gerstenstein 79' | Stadium: Stadion Miejski im. Bernarda Szymańskiego; Attendance: 501; Referee: Paweł Wrzeszczyński (Kalisz) |

| 1 September 2026 | Siarka Tarnobrzeg | 3–2 | Zagłębie Lubin | Tarnobrzeg |
| 16:00 CEST (UTC+02:00) | Wacławek 6'; Peciak 47'; Kromka 77' | Report | Michalski 65'; Woźniak 90' (pen.) | Stadium: Stadion Miejski; Attendance: 1,540; Referee: Paweł Pskit (Łódź) |

| 1 September 2026 | Odra Opole | 2–1 | Wisła Kraków | Opole |
| 17:30 CEST (UTC+02:00) | Szysz 52'; Feliks 60' | Report | Kuziemka 16' | Stadium: Itaka Arena; Attendance: 6,421; Referee: Damian Kos (Gdańsk) |

| 1 September 2026 | MKS Kluczbork | 1–2 | Lechia Gdańsk | Kluczbork |
| 19:00 CEST (UTC+02:00) | Wojtyra 47' | Report | Ziółkowski 51'; Sonko 90+2' | Stadium: Stadion Miejski; Attendance: 999; Referee: Damian Krumplewski (Olsztyn) |

| 1 September 2026 | Polonia Środa Wielkopolska | 3–2 | Sandecja Nowy Sącz | Środa Wielkopolska |
| 19:00 CEST (UTC+02:00) | Skrobosiński 12'; Wilczyński 45', 65' | Report | Danek 19'; Kieliś 49' | Stadium: Stadion Średzki; Attendance: 731; Referee: Jan Chmielak (Warsaw) |

| 1 September 2026 | Stal Rzeszów | 3–0 | Podbeskidzie Bielsko-Biała | Rzeszów |
| 19:00 CEST (UTC+02:00) | Pukała 71', 74', 81' | Report | | Stadium: Stadion Miejski; Attendance: 1,493; Referee: Grzegorz Kawałko (Olsztyn) |

| 1 September 2026 | Wigry Suwałki | 1–5 | Bruk-Bet Termalica Nieciecza | Suwałki |
| 19:47 CEST (UTC+02:00) | Bajdur 57' | Report | Biniek 12', 26'; Jakubik 45', 52', 66' | Stadium: Stadion Miejski; Attendance: 862; Referee: Piotr Urban (Warsaw) |

| 1 September 2026 | Motor Lublin | 3–0 | Legia Warsaw | Lublin |
| 20:30 CEST (UTC+02:00) | Czubak 3'; Ronaldo 40'; Ndiaye 90' | Report | | Stadium: Arena Lublin; Attendance: 11,348; Referee: Piotr Lasyk (Bytom) |

| 2 September 2026 | Wikęd Luzino | 2–3 | Wisła Płock | Luzino |
| 14:30 CEST (UTC+02:00) | Ziętarski 64' (pen.); Kostuch 90+5' (pen.) | Report | Kościelecki 6'; Sekulski 45'; Pomorski 60' | Stadium: Stadion Gminny; Attendance: 600; Referee: Mateusz Jenda (Warsaw) |

| 2 September 2026 | Górnik Polkowice | 0–1 | Polonia Warsaw | Polkowice |
| 16:00 CEST (UTC+02:00) | | Report | Dadok 85' | Stadium: Stadion Miejski; Attendance: 500; Referee: Paweł Maćkowiak (Szczecin) |

| 2 September 2026 | Beskid Andrychów | 1–3 | Śląsk Wrocław II | Andrychów |
| 16:00 CEST (UTC+02:00) | Shkitun 2' (pen.) | Report | Stangret 13', 52'; Muszyński 89' | Stadium: Stadion Miejski; Attendance: 600; Referee: Rafał Szydełko (Rzeszów) |

| 2 September 2026 | Górnik Zabrze II | 3–4 | Olimpia Grudziądz | Zabrze |
| 16:00 CEST (UTC+02:00) | Podolski 24'; Pietrzyk 53' (pen.); Posmyk 83' | Report | Wichtowski 13' (pen.); Cichoń 19' (pen.); Szafranek 68'; Jarzec 90' | Stadium: Arena Zabrze; Attendance: 999; Referee: Hubert Zięba (Kielce) |

| 2 September 2026 | Górnik Łęczna | 3–3 (a.e.t.) (4–3 p) | Stal Mielec | Łęczna |
| 17:00 CEST (UTC+02:00) | Akhmedov 21', 110'; Myszor 54' | Report | Odolak 90+2'; Niedźwiedź 90+3'; Musiolik 111' | Stadium: Stadion Miejski; Attendance: 1,153; Referee: Patryk Świerczek (Brzesko) |
| | Penalties |
| | Deja (penalty scored); Walski (penalty scored); Hołownia (penalty scored); Akhmedov (penalty missed); Antkowiak (penalty scored) | | (penalty scored) Musiolik; (penalty missed) Cybulski; (penalty scored) Matynia; (penalty scored) Odolak; (penalty missed) Niedźwiedź |

| 2 September 2026 | Znicz Pruszków | 1–1 (a.e.t.) (4–3 p) | Cracovia | Pruszków |
| 17:30 CEST (UTC+02:00) | Proczek 90' (pen.) | Report | Hasić 80' | Stadium: Stadion Znicza Pruszków; Attendance: 990; Referee: Mateusz Piszczelok (Katowice) |
| | Penalties |
| | Barnowski (penalty scored); Proczek (penalty scored); Ratajczyk (penalty scored); Głowiński (penalty missed); Borecki (penalty missed); Kosmalski (penalty missed); Nadolski (penalty scored) | | (penalty scored) Hasić; (penalty scored) Klich; (penalty missed) Kameri; (penalty missed) Perković; (penalty scored) Kakabadze; (penalty missed) Traoré; (penalty missed) Berte |

| 2 September 2026 | Lechia Zielona Góra | 0–2 | Ruch Chorzów | Zielona Góra |
| 18:00 CEST (UTC+02:00) | | Report | Komor 3'; Chrapek 41' | Stadium: Stadion MOSiR; Attendance: 950; Referee: Aleksander Borowiak (Poznań) |

| 2 September 2026 | Sokół Ostróda | 1–2 | Sokół Kleczew | Ostróda |
| 19:00 CEST (UTC+02:00) | Nowicki 11' (pen.) | Report | Zimmer 30'; Adamski 78' | Stadium: Stadion Miejski; Attendance: 963; Referee: Dawid Muc (Radom) |

| 2 September 2026 | Miedź Legnica | 0–1 | Chrobry Głogów | Legnica |
| 19:00 CEST (UTC+02:00) | | Report | Rybak 21' | Stadium: White Eagle Municipal Stadium; Attendance: 3,151; Referee: Paweł Malec (Łódź) |

| 2 September 2026 | Resovia Rzeszów | 0–4 | Arka Gdynia | Rzeszów |
| 19:05 CEST (UTC+02:00) | | Report | Rama 3', 54'; Kowalski 48'; Demirović 80' | Stadium: Stadion Miejski; Attendance: 759; Referee: Sebastian Krasny (Kraków) |

| 2 September 2026 | Widzew Łódź | 0–1 | Korona Kielce | Łódź |
| 20:30 CEST (UTC+02:00) | | Report | Bąk 73' | Stadium: Widzew Łódź Stadium; Attendance: 15,578; Referee: Patryk Gryckiewicz (Toruń) |

| 3 September 2026 | Avia Świdnik | 3–1 | Wieczysta Kraków | Świdnik |
| 14:30 CEST (UTC+02:00) | Zuber 14'; Remenyuk 64'; Falbierski 85' | Report | Koulouris 40' | Stadium: Stadion Miejski; Attendance: 1,020; Referee: Piotr Rzucidło (Warsaw) |

| 3 September 2026 | GKS Tychy | 1–0 | ŁKS Łódź | Tychy |
| 17:30 CEST (UTC+02:00) | Kądzior 76' | Report | | Stadium: Stadion Miejski; Attendance: 2,710; Referee: Tomasz Marciniak (Płock) |

| 3 September 2026 | Śląsk Wrocław | 2–1 | Pogoń Szczecin | Wrocław |
| 20:30 CEST (UTC+02:00) | Samiec-Talar 4'; Matsenko 84' | Report | Mukairu 64' | Stadium: Tarczyński Arena Wrocław; Attendance: 10,238; Referee: Wojciech Myć (Lublin) |

| 15 September 2026 | Widzew Łódź II | 1–2 | Polonia Bytom | Łódź |
| 15:00 CEST (UTC+02:00) | Zieleniecki 70' | Report | Mioč 2'; Orlik 66' | Stadium: Łodzianka Training Center; Attendance: 320; Referee: Mateusz Mastaj (Rzeszów) |

== Round of 32 ==
The draw for this round was conducted at the headquarters of Telewizja Polska on 17 September 2026. The matches were played on 27–29 October 2026. Participating in this round were the 27 winners from the first round and five teams that qualified for 2026–27 UEFA club competitions. Matches were hosted by the team playing in a lower division in the 2026–27 season or by the team drawn first in the case of a match between clubs from the same division.

Number of teams per 2025–26 season tier still in competition
| 2025–26 Ekstraklasa | 2025–26 I liga | 2025–26 II liga | 2025–26 Regional cup winners | Total |
|---|---|---|---|---|
| 13 / 18 | 12 / 18 | 4 / 18 | 3 / 16 | 32 / 70 |

The number in brackets indicates the league level the club is competing in during the 2026–27 season.

| Team 1 | Score | Team 2 |
27 October 2026
| Motor Lublin (1) | 1–1 (a.e.t.) (1–3 p) | Raków Częstochowa (1) |
| Olimpia Grudziądz (3) | 0–1 | Bruk-Bet Termalica Nieciecza (2) |
| Piast Gliwice (1) | 0–0 (a.e.t.) (1–3 p) | Górnik Zabrze (1) |
| Górnik Łęczna (3) | 1–0 | GKS Katowice (1) |
28 October 2026
| Siarka Tarnobrzeg (4) | 1–0 | Lech Poznań (1) |
| Sokół Kleczew (3) | 2–1 | Podhale Nowy Targ (3) |
| Polonia Środa Wielkopolska (4) | 3–1 | Śląsk Wrocław II (3) |
| Lechia Gdańsk (2) | 0–6 | Jagiellonia Białystok (1) |
| Puszcza Niepołomice (2) | 1–2 (a.e.t.) | Wisła Płock (1) |
| Znicz Pruszków (3) | 0–1 | Ruch Chorzów (2) |
| GKS Tychy (3) | 4–2 (a.e.t.) | Pogoń Siedlce (2) |
29 October 2026
| Chrobry Głogów (2) | 2–0 | Polonia Bytom (2) |
| Avia Świdnik (3) | 2–1 (a.e.t.) | Radomiak Radom (1) |
| Arka Gdynia (2) | 1–2 | Stal Rzeszów (2) |
| Polonia Warsaw (2) | 2–1 | Korona Kielce (1) |
| Odra Opole (2) | 2–1 (a.e.t.) | Śląsk Wrocław (1) |

| 27 October 2026 | Olimpia Grudziądz | 0–1 | Bruk-Bet Termalica Nieciecza | Świecie |
| 12:30 CET (UTC+01:00) | | Report | Kubica 90+2' | Stadium: Stadion Miejski; Attendance: 210; Referee: Tomasz Marciniak (Płock) |

| 27 October 2026 | Górnik Łęczna | 1–0 | GKS Katowice | Łęczna |
| 12:30 CET (UTC+01:00) | Tkacz 32' | Report | | Stadium: Stadion Miejski; Attendance: 1,333; Referee: Paweł Malec (Łódź) |

| 27 October 2026 | Motor Lublin | 1–1 (a.e.t.) (1–3 p) | Raków Częstochowa | Lublin |
| 17:30 CET (UTC+01:00) | Ndiaye 51' (pen.) | Report | Diaby-Fadiga 90+4' | Stadium: Arena Lublin; Attendance: 7,183; Referee: Paweł Raczkowski (Warsaw) |
| | Penalties |
| | Bourhane (penalty missed); Lukoszek (penalty scored); Meyer (penalty missed); Aïko (penalty missed) | | (penalty scored) Diaby-Fadiga; (penalty scored) Pieńko; (penalty scored) Kocherhin; (penalty missed) Racovițan |

| 27 October 2026 | Piast Gliwice | 0–0 (a.e.t.) (1–3 p) | Górnik Zabrze | Gliwice |
| 20:30 CET (UTC+01:00) | | Report | | Stadium: Stadion Miejski im. Piotra Wieczorka; Attendance: 7,324; Referee: Damian Sylwestrzak (Wrocław) |
| | Penalties |
| | Łabojko (penalty missed); Ntamack (penalty scored); Vallejo (penalty missed); Juande (penalty missed) | | (penalty missed) Urbański; (penalty scored) Janicki; (penalty scored) Janža; (penalty scored) Bernardo |

| 28 October 2026 | Siarka Tarnobrzeg | 1–0 | Lech Poznań | Tarnobrzeg |
| 12:30 CET (UTC+01:00) | Kasia 64' | Report | | Stadium: Stadion Miejski; Attendance: 4,245; Referee: Daniel Stefański (Bydgoszcz) |

| 28 October 2026 | Sokół Kleczew | 2–1 | Podhale Nowy Targ | Kleczew |
| 12:30 CET (UTC+01:00) | Dudziński 14'; Śpiewak 38' | Report | Voško 81' | Stadium: Stadion Miejski; Attendance: 92; Referee: Piotr Rzucidło (Warsaw) |

| 28 October 2026 | Puszcza Niepołomice | 1–2 (a.e.t.) | Wisła Płock | Niepołomice |
| 17:30 CET (UTC+01:00) | Kurzeja 83' | Report | Hamulić 29'; Akere 109' | Stadium: Stadion GOSiR; Attendance: 987; Referee: Wojciech Myć (Lublin) |

| 28 October 2026 | Znicz Pruszków | 0–1 | Ruch Chorzów | Pruszków |
| 17:30 CET (UTC+01:00) | | Report | Chrapek 64' | Stadium: Stadion Znicza Pruszków; Attendance: 1,200; Referee: Filip Kaliszewski (Gdańsk) |

| 28 October 2026 | GKS Tychy | 4–2 (a.e.t.) | Pogoń Siedlce | Tychy |
| 18:30 CET (UTC+01:00) | Plichta 5', 18'; Chorosiński 97'; Lewandowski 120' | Report | Demianiuk 69'; Rosołek 90+3' | Stadium: Stadion Miejski; Attendance: 2,109; Referee: Piotr Idzik (Poznań) |

| 28 October 2026 | Polonia Środa Wielkopolska | 3–1 | Śląsk Wrocław II | Środa Wielkopolska |
| 19:00 CET (UTC+01:00) | Mikita 38'; Bartkowiak 44'; Skrobosiński 50' | Report | Kobelczuk 36' | Stadium: Stadion Średzki; Attendance: 910; Referee: Maciej Kuropatwa (Katowice) |

| 28 October 2026 | Lechia Gdańsk | 0–6 | Jagiellonia Białystok | Gdańsk |
| 20:30 CET (UTC+01:00) | | Report | Prelec 34'; Sow 40', 50', 61'; Imaz 54'; Rallis 68' | Stadium: Polsat Plus Arena Gdańsk; Attendance: 6,282; Referee: Tomasz Kwiatkowski (Warsaw) |

| 29 October 2026 | Avia Świdnik | 2–1 (a.e.t.) | Radomiak Radom | Świdnik |
| 12:30 CET (UTC+01:00) | Aftyka 90+5' (pen.); Wełniak 114' | Report | Tapsoba 25' | Stadium: Stadion Miejski; Attendance: 1,869; Referee: Damian Krumplewski (Olsztyn) |

| 29 October 2026 | Chrobry Głogów | 2–0 | Polonia Bytom | Głogów |
| 17:30 CET (UTC+01:00) | Sharabura 33'; Rybak 35' | Report | | Stadium: Stadion Miejski; Attendance: 1,177; Referee: Paweł Pskit (Łódź) |

| 29 October 2026 | Polonia Warsaw | 2–1 | Korona Kielce | Warsaw |
| 17:30 CET (UTC+01:00) | Pięczek 27' (o.g.); Kostorz 48' | Report | Bąk 51' | Stadium: Stadion Miejski im. gen. Kazimierza Sosnkowskiego; Attendance: 3,685; Referee: Jarosław Przybył (Kluczbork) |

| 29 October 2026 | Arka Gdynia | 1–2 | Stal Rzeszów | Gdynia |
| 19:00 CET (UTC+01:00) | Milewski 2' | Report | Buksa 77', 81' | Stadium: Stadion GOSiR; Attendance: 4,287; Referee: Szymon Łężny (Kluczbork) |

| 29 October 2026 | Odra Opole | 2–1 (a.e.t.) | Śląsk Wrocław | Opole |
| 20:30 CET (UTC+01:00) | Szysz 90+5'; Nalepa 100' | Report | Tomasiewicz 81' | Stadium: Itaka Arena; Attendance: 9,753; Referee: Piotr Lasyk (Bytom) |

== Round of 16 ==
The draw for this round was conducted at the headquarters of Telewizja Polska on 30 October 2026. The matches will be played on 1–3 December 2026. Participating in this round are the 16 winners from the previous round. Matches will be hosted by the team playing in a lower division in the 2026–27 season or by the team drawn first in the case of a match between clubs from the same division.

Number of teams per 2025–26 season tier still in competition
| 2025–26 Ekstraklasa | 2025–26 I liga | 2025–26 II liga | 2025–26 Regional cup winners | Total |
|---|---|---|---|---|
| 5 / 18 | 7 / 18 | 1 / 18 | 3 / 16 | 16 / 70 |

The number in brackets indicates the league level the club is competing in during the 2026–27 season.

| Team 1 | Score | Team 2 |
1–3 December 2026
| Polonia Środa Wielkopolska (4) | Match 55 | Sokół Kleczew (3) |
| Bruk-Bet Termalica Nieciecza (2) | Match 56 | Jagiellonia Białystok (1) |
| Siarka Tarnobrzeg (4) | Match 57 | Stal Rzeszów (2) |
| Polonia Warsaw (2) | Match 58 | Raków Częstochowa (1) |
| Avia Świdnik (3) | Match 59 | Górnik Zabrze (1) |
| GKS Tychy (3) | Match 60 | Chrobry Głogów (2) |
| Górnik Łęczna (3) | Match 61 | Wisła Płock (1) |
| Odra Opole (2) | Match 62 | Ruch Chorzów (2) |

| 1–3 December 2026 | Polonia Środa Wielkopolska | v | Sokół Kleczew | Środa Wielkopolska |
| CET (UTC+01:00) | | | | Stadium: Stadion Średzki |

| 1–3 December 2026 | Bruk-Bet Termalica Nieciecza | v | Jagiellonia Białystok | Nieciecza |
| CET (UTC+01:00) | | | | Stadium: Stadion Sportowy Bruk-Bet Termalica |

| 1–3 December 2026 | Siarka Tarnobrzeg | v | Stal Rzeszów | Tarnobrzeg |
| CET (UTC+01:00) | | | | Stadium: Stadion Miejski |

| 1–3 December 2026 | Polonia Warsaw | v | Raków Częstochowa | Warsaw |
| CET (UTC+01:00) | | | | Stadium: Stadion Miejski im. gen. Kazimierza Sosnkowskiego |

| 1–3 December 2026 | Avia Świdnik | v | Górnik Zabrze | Świdnik |
| CET (UTC+01:00) | | | | Stadium: Stadion Miejski |

| 1–3 December 2026 | GKS Tychy | v | Chrobry Głogów | Tychy |
| CET (UTC+01:00) | | | | Stadium: Stadion Miejski |

| 1–3 December 2026 | Górnik Łęczna | v | Wisła Płock | Łęczna |
| CET (UTC+01:00) | | | | Stadium: Stadion Miejski |

| 1–3 December 2026 | Odra Opole | v | Ruch Chorzów | Opole |
| CET (UTC+01:00) | | | | Stadium: Itaka Arena |

== Quarter-finals ==
The matches will be played on 2–4 March 2027. Participating in this round are the 8 winners from the previous round. Games will be hosted by teams playing in a lower division in the 2026–27 season or by first drawn team in a case of match between clubs from the same division.

| Team 1 | Score | Team 2 |
2–4 March 2027
| | Match 63 | |
| | Match 64 | |
| | Match 65 | |
| | Match 66 | |

== Semi-finals ==
The matches will be played on 6–8 April 2027. Participating in this round are the 4 winners from the previous round. Games will be hosted by teams playing in a lower division in the 2026–27 season or by first drawn team in a case of match between clubs from the same division.

| Team 1 | Score | Team 2 |
6–8 April 2027
| | Match 67 | |
| | Match 68 | |

== Final ==
2 May 2027
16:00 CEST (UTC+02:00)

| v |
|---|
| [ 90minut] [ Łączy nas piłka] |

Stadion Narodowy, Warsaw
