= Efimenko =

Efimenko, Yefimenko, or Jefimenko (Ukrainian: Єфименко; Russian: Ефименко) is a gender-neutral Ukrainian surname. It may refer to:

- Alexei Yefimenko (born 1985), Belarusian ice hockey player
- Anna Efimenko (born 1980), Russian Paralympic swimmer
- Dmytro Yefimenko (born 2001), Ukrainian footballer
- Liubov Efimenko (born 1999), Finnish figure skater
- Maria Efimenko (born 1996), Ukrainian chess player
- Oleg D. Jefimenko (1922–2009), Ukrainian-American physicist
- Olha Yefimenko (born 1978), Ukrainian diver
- Tatyana Efimenko (born 1981), Kyrgyzstani high jumper
- Zahar Efimenko (born 1985), Ukrainian chess player
