= Adrian Lis =

Polish footballer (born 1992)

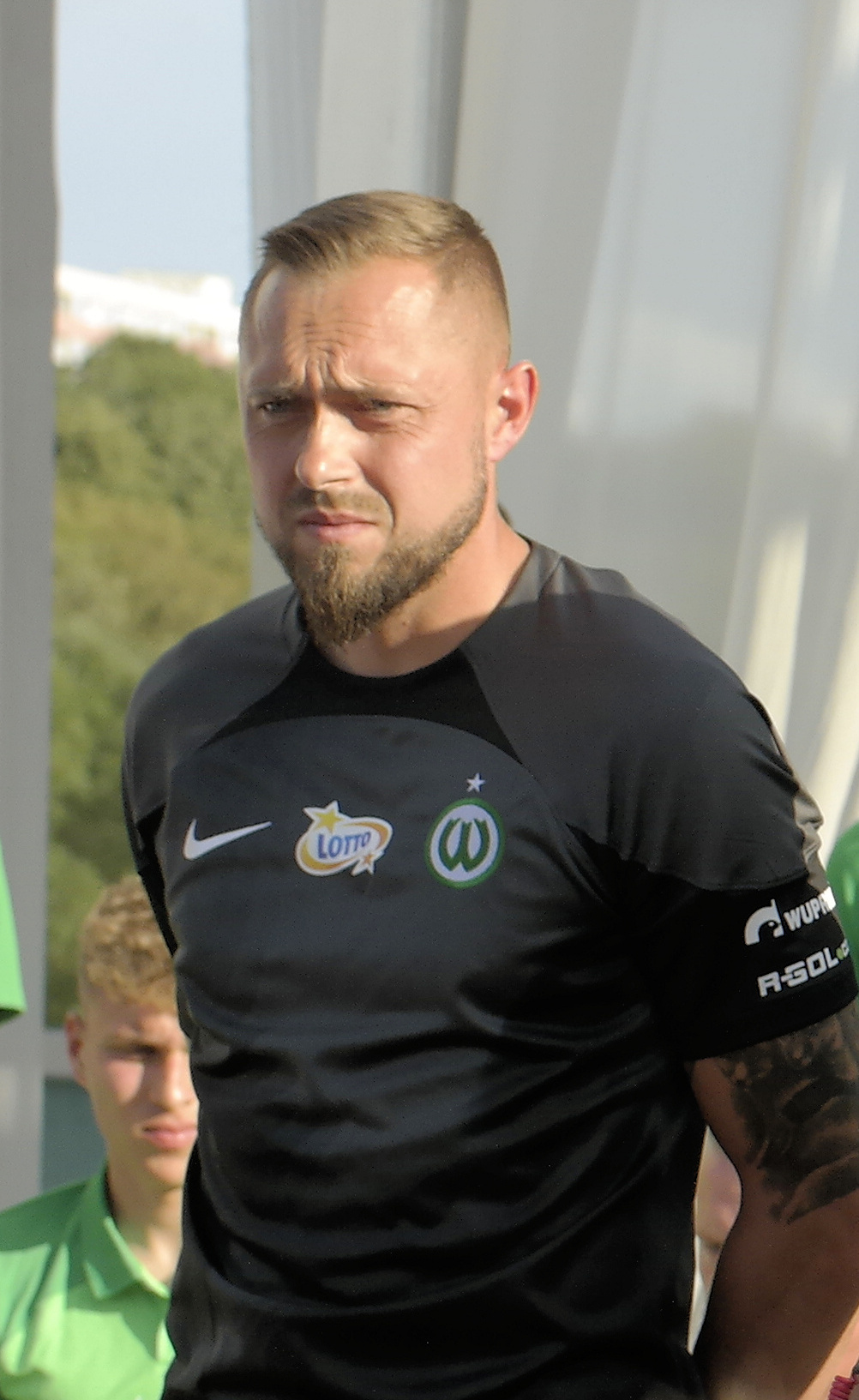
- Lis in 2023 with Warta Poznań

Personal information
- Full name: Adrian Lis
- Date of birth: 28 May 1992 (age 34)
- Place of birth: Poznań, Poland
- Height: 1.92 m (6 ft 4 in)
- Position: Goalkeeper

Team information
- Current team: Sokół Kleczew
- Number: 1

Youth career
- 2004–2005: Las Puszczykowo
- 2005–2009: Warta Poznań

Senior career*
Years	Team	Apps	(Gls)
2009–2014	Warta Poznań	26	(0)
2010	→ Polonia Środa Wlkp. (loan)	14	(0)
2011–2012	→ Polonia Warsaw (loan)	0	(0)
2014–2017	Polonia Środa Wlkp.	101	(1)
2017–2024	Warta Poznań	183	(1)
2024–2026	Lech Poznań II	21	(0)
2026–	Sokół Kleczew	0	(0)
- * Club domestic league appearances and goals as of 09:43, 4 June 2026 (UTC)

Adrian Lis (born 28 May 1992) is a Polish professional footballer who plays as a goalkeeper for II liga club Sokół Kleczew.

He netted his first Ekstraklasa goal on 6 February 2022, scoring an equalizer in stoppage time for Warta Poznań in a 1–1 draw against Górnik Łęczna.

== Career statistics ==
As of match played 13 May 2026

Appearances and goals by club, season and competition
Club	Season	League			Polish Cup		Other		Total	
Club	Season	Division	Apps	Goals	Apps	Goals	Apps	Goals	Apps	Goals
Warta Poznań	2010–11	I liga	2	0	0	0	—		2	0
Warta Poznań	2012–13	I liga	18	0	1	0	—		19	0
Warta Poznań	2013–14	II liga	6	0	1	0	—		7	0
Warta Poznań	Total		26	0	2	0	—		28	0
Polonia Środa Wlkp. (loan)	2010–11	IV liga GP	14	0	—		—		14	0
Polonia Warsaw (loan)	2011–12	Ekstraklasa	0	0	0	0	—		0	0
Polonia Środa Wlkp.	2013–14	III liga, gr. C	15	0	—		—		15	0
Polonia Środa Wlkp.	2014–15	III liga, gr. C	33	1	—		—		33	1
Polonia Środa Wlkp.	2015–16	III liga, gr. C	29	0	—		—		29	0
Polonia Środa Wlkp.	2016–17	III liga, gr. II	24	0	—		—		24	0
Polonia Środa Wlkp.	Total		101	1	—		—		101	1
Warta Poznań	2017–18	II liga	28	0	0	0	—		28	0
Warta Poznań	2018–19	I liga	30	0	1	0	—		31	0
Warta Poznań	2019–20	I liga	36	0	1	0	—		37	0
Warta Poznań	2020–21	Ekstraklasa	25	0	1	0	—		26	0
Warta Poznań	2021–22	Ekstraklasa	25	1	1	0	—		26	1
Warta Poznań	2022–23	Ekstraklasa	29	0	0	0	—		29	0
Warta Poznań	2023–24	Ekstraklasa	10	0	2	0	—		12	0
Warta Poznań	Total		183	1	6	0	—		189	1
Lech Poznań II	2024–25	III liga, gr. II	16	0	0	0	—		16	0
Lech Poznań II	2025–26	III liga, gr. II	5	0	—		—		5	0
Lech Poznań II	Total		21	0	0	0	—		21	0
Sokół Kleczew	2026–27	II liga	0	0	0	0	—		0	0
Career total			345	2	8	0	0	0	353	2

== Honours ==
Polonia Środa Wielkopolska

- IV liga Greater Poland North: 2010–11
- Polish Cup (Greater Poland regionals): 2016–17
- Polish Cup (Poznań regionals): 2014–15, 2015–16, 2016–17
