= 2026–27 Zagłębie Lubin season =

Zagłębie Lubin
2026–27 season
- Ekstraklasa: Pre-season
- Polish Cup: Pre-season

The 2026–27 season is the 82nd season in the history of Zagłębie Lubin.

== Transfers ==
=== In ===
| Pos. | Player | Transferred to | Fee | Date | Source |
|---|---|---|---|---|---|
| GK | (Serbia) Zlatan Alomerović | (Cyprus) AEK Larnaca | Free | 1 July 2026 | |
| FW | (Germany) Sebastian Kerk | (Poland) Arka Gdynia | Undisclosed | 1 July 2026 | |
| GK | (Croatia) David Čolina | (Germany) FC Augsburg | Undisclosed | 3 July 2026 | |

== Pre-season and friendlies ==
| 26 June 2026 Friendly | Zagłębie Lubin (Poland) | 3–0 | (Poland) Miedź Legnica | Lubin |
| 19:30 | 13'; 17'; 40' | | | Stadium: KGHM Zagłębie Football Academy |
Note: The match originally scheduled for 27 June was brought forward due to a heatwave.

| 1 July 2026 Friendly | Zagłębie Lubin (Poland) | 3–2 | (Slovakia) Železiarne Podbrezová |
| 17:00 | 8'; 64' (o.g.); 83' | | (red card) 43'; 51', 79' |

| 4 July 2026 Friendly | Zagłębie Lubin (Poland) | 2–0 | (Poland) Pogoń Szczecin |
| 15:00 | 9'; 29' |

| 8 July 2026 Friendly | Zagłębie Lubin (Poland) | 0–2 | (Czech Republic) Baník Ostrava |
| 14:00 |

| 17 July 2026 Friendly | Zagłębie Lubin (Poland) | 0–2 | (Czech Republic) Bohemians 1905 |
| 16:00 |

| 18 July 2026 Friendly | Zagłębie Lubin (Poland) | 3–0 | (Poland) Chrobry Głogów |
| 14:15 |

== Competitions ==
=== Overall record ===
| Competition | First match | Last match | Starting round | Record | | | | | | | |
| Competition | First match | Last match | Starting round | Pld | W | D | L | GF | GA | GD | Win % |
|---|---|---|---|---|---|---|---|---|---|---|---|
| Ekstraklasa | 24–27 July 2026 | | Matchday 1 | 0 | 0 | 0 | 0 | 0 | 0 | +0 | — |
| Polish Cup | | | | 0 | 0 | 0 | 0 | 0 | 0 | +0 | — |
| Total | | | | 0 | 0 | 0 | 0 | 0 | 0 | +0 | — |

Source: Competitions

=== Ekstraklasa ===
| Pos | Team | Pld | W | D | L | GF | GA | GD | Pts | Qualification or relegation |
|---|---|---|---|---|---|---|---|---|---|---|
| 1 | Jagiellonia Białystok | 2 | 2 | 0 | 0 | 3 | 1 | +2 | 6 | Qualification for the Champions League play-off round |
| 2 | Wisła Płock | 2 | 1 | 1 | 0 | 2 | 1 | +1 | 4 | Qualification for the Champions League second qualifying round |
| 3 | Zagłębie Lubin | 1 | 1 | 0 | 0 | 2 | 0 | +2 | 3 | Qualification for the Europa League second qualifying round |
| 4 | Górnik Zabrze | 1 | 1 | 0 | 0 | 2 | 1 | +1 | 3 | Qualification for the Conference League second qualifying round |
| 4 | Radomiak Radom | 1 | 1 | 0 | 0 | 2 | 1 | +1 | 3 | |

Updated to match(es) played on 27 July 2026. Source: ekstraklasa.org 90minut.pl
Rules for classification: 1) Points; 2) Head-to-head points; 3) Head-to-head goal difference; 4) Goal difference; 5) Goals scored; 6) Number of wins; 7) Number of away wins; 8) Lower number of points based on yellow and red cards (red card = 3 points, yellow card = 1 point, sending-off = 3 points - including 1 point for first yellow card); 9) Fairplay ranking; 10) Draw.
(Note: Head-to-head record is used only after all the matches between the teams in question have been played)

==== Matches ====
| 27 July 2026 1 | Zagłębie Lubin | 2–0 | Piast Gliwice | Lubin |
| 19:00 | Sypek 72'; Regula 86' | | | Referee: Piotr Rzucidło |

| 2 August 2026 2 | Legia Warsaw | v | Zagłębie Lubin | Warsaw |
| 14:45 | | | | Stadium: Polish Army Stadium |
