= Bartosz Guzdek =

Polish footballer (born 2002)

Personal information
- Full name: Bartosz Guzdek
- Date of birth: 28 July 2002 (age 24)
- Place of birth: Wadowice, Poland
- Height: 1.90 m (6 ft 3 in)
- Position: Forward

Team information
- Current team: Wigry Suwałki
- Number: 9

Youth career
- 2012–2013: Rekord Bielsko-Biała
- 2013–2015: Piast Cieszyn
- 2015–2019: Rekord Bielsko-Biała

Senior career*
Years	Team	Apps	(Gls)
2019–2021	Rekord Bielsko-Biała	24	(9)
2021	→ Ruch Chorzów (loan)	6	(0)
2021–2023	Widzew Łódź	27	(6)
2022–2023	→ Odra Opole (loan)	24	(2)
2023–2025	Miedź Legnica	13	(1)
2024–2025	→ Wisła Puławy (loan)	15	(4)
2025	→ Olimpia Grudziądz (loan)	6	(0)
2025–	Wigry Suwałki	31	(8)

International career
2021	Poland U20	2	(0)
- * Club domestic league appearances and goals as of 23:36, 3 June 2026 (UTC)

Bartosz Guzdek (born 28 July 2002) is a Polish professional footballer who plays as a forward for III liga club Wigry Suwałki.

== Career statistics ==
As of match played 22 May 2026

Appearances and goals by club, season and competition
Club	Season	League			Polish Cup		Europe		Other		Total	
Club	Season	Division	Apps	Goals	Apps	Goals	Apps	Goals	Apps	Goals	Apps	Goals
Rekord Bielsko-Biała	2019–20	III liga, gr. III	7	3	1	0	—		—		8	3
Rekord Bielsko-Biała	2020–21	III liga, gr. III	17	6	—		—		—		17	6
Rekord Bielsko-Biała	Total		24	9	1	0	—		—		25	9
Ruch Chorzów (loan)	2020–21	III liga, gr. III	6	0	—		—		—		6	0
Widzew Łódź	2021–22	I liga	27	6	3	1	—		—		30	6
Odra Opole (loan)	2022–23	I liga	24	2	1	0	—		—		25	2
Miedź Legnica	2023–24	I liga	13	1	0	0	—		—		13	1
Wisła Puławy (loan)	2024–25	II liga	15	4	0	0	—		—		15	4
Olimpia Grudziądz (loan)	2024–25	II liga	6	0	—		—		0	0	6	0
Wigry Suwałki	2025–26	III liga, gr. I	31	8	—		—		—		31	8
Career total			146	30	5	1	0	0	0	0	151	31

== Honours ==
Ruch Chorzów

- III liga, group III: 2020–21
- Polish Cup (Katowice regionals): 2020–21

Wigry Suwałki

- Polish Cup (Podlasie regionals): 2025–26
