= Sokół Kleczew =

Polish football club

- Full name: Klub Sportowy Sokół Kleczew
- Founded: 1928; 98 years ago as Spójnia Kleczew
- Ground: Kleczew Municipal Stadium
- Capacity: 800
- Chairman: Grzegorz Dobski
- Manager: Krzysztof Urtnowski
- League: II liga
- 2025–26: II liga, 14th of 18
- Website: sokolkleczew.pl

Klub Sportowy Sokół Kleczew is a Polish football club based in Kleczew, Greater Poland Voivodeship, established in 1928. As of the 2026–27 season, they compete in the II liga, the third tier of Polish football.

== Players ==
=== Current squad ===
As of 14 September 2026

Note: Flags indicate national team as defined under FIFA eligibility rules; some limited exceptions apply. Players may hold more than one non-FIFA nationality.

No.	Pos.	Nation	Player
1	GK	POL	Adrian Lis (vice-captain)
2	DF	POL	Michał Zimmer
3	DF	POL	Mateusz Gawlik
4	DF	POL	Mateusz Wypych
6	MF	POL	Mateusz Piotrowski
7	MF	POL	Jacek Tkaczyk
8	MF	POL	Daniel Dudziński (vice-captain)
9	MF	POL	Bartłomiej Juszczyk
10	FW	POL	Kacper Śpiewak
11	MF	POL	Filip Adamski (on loan from Górnik Zabrze)
14	DF	POL	Bartłomiej Zieliński (on loan from Raków Częstochowa II)
15	DF	POL	Jan Andrzejewski (captain)

No.	Pos.	Nation	Player
17	MF	POL	Bartosz Kosiba
19	DF	POL	Mateusz Książek (on loan from ŁKS Łódź)
22	MF	POL	Aleksander Kubacki
23	MF	POL	Igor Ławrynowicz
25	DF	POL	Eryk Marcinkowski
27	MF	POL	Jakub Antczak
28	DF	UKR	Volodymyr Kostevych
29	FW	POL	Igor Jagodziński
30	GK	POL	Adam Wójcik (on loan from Odra Opole)
47	MF	POL	Oskar Dari (on loan from Wisła Płock)
—	DF	POL	Krystian Szymocha

=== Out on loan ===
Note: Flags indicate national team as defined under FIFA eligibility rules; some limited exceptions apply. Players may hold more than one non-FIFA nationality.

No.	Pos.	Nation	Player
—	DF	POL	Jakub Bobrowski (at Czarni Ostrowite until 30 June 2027)
—	FW	POL	Hubert Kupczak (at Polonia Golina until 30 June 2027)

No.	Pos.	Nation	Player
—	MF	POL	Szymon Łukowski (at Wilki Wilczyn until 30 June 2027)
—	FW	POL	Dawid Szygenda (at Polonus Kazimierz Biskupi until 30 June 2027)

== Coaching staff ==
As of 23 December 2025

Position	Staff
Head coach	(Poland) Tomasz Pozorski
Assistant coach	(Poland) Albert Gośliński
Goalkeeping coach	(Poland) Konrad Winiarski
Fitness coach	(Poland) Jakub Wolski
Strength and conditioning coach	(Poland) Oliwier Wiśniewski
Physiotherapist	(Poland) Mateusz Łagodziński
Masseur	(Poland) Miłosz Wawrzyniak
Team manager	(Poland) Gracjan Dobski
Equipment manager	(Poland) Marek Rajtakowski

== Honours ==
- III liga
  - Group II
    - Champions: 2024–25
  - Kuyavia-Pomerania - Greater Poland
    - Champions: 2013–14
    - Runners-up: 2012–13, 2014–15
- IV liga Greater Poland (South)
  - Champions: 2010–11
  - Runners-up: 2008–09
- Polish Cup (Greater Poland regionals)
  - Winners: 2010–11, 2012–13, 2013–14, 2022–23
- Polish Cup (Konin regionals)
  - Winners: 2008–09, 2010–11, 2012–13, 2013–14, 2017–18, 2018–19
  - Runners-up: 2006–07, 2014–15, 2016–17

== Polish Cup records ==
Season	Round	Opponent	Result
2011–12	Extra preliminary round	Polonia Słubice	9–3
2011–12	Preliminary round	Lech Rypin	3–2
2011–12	First round	MKS Kluczbork	0–2
2013–14	Extra preliminary round	Wisła Płock	1–0
2013–14	Preliminary round	KS Polkowice	1–1 (0–2 p)
2014–15	Extra preliminary round	Zagłębie Sosnowiec	1–1 (5–4 p)
2014–15	Preliminary round	Unia Solec Kujawski	3–0
2014–15	First round	Miedź Legnica	1–4
2023–24	First round	Zagłębie Lubin	2–3 (a.e.t.)
2026–27	Preliminary round	Unia Skierniewice	2–2 (4–1 p)
2026–27	First round	Sokół Ostróda	2–1
2026–27	Round of 32		
