= 1936 Legia Warsaw season =

Legia Warsaw
1936 season
- Ekstraklasa: 10th (relegated)

During the 1936 season, Legia Warsaw participated in the Ekstraklasa.

It was the only season in history in which Legia were relegated from the top-division league. It was also a season that brought Legia long-term disgraceful records (a record number of lost matches in a row and in the season overall), the beating of which was brought about only in their 2021–22 season.

== Competitions ==
=== Ekstraklasa ===
==== League table ====
Pos	Team	Pld	W	D	L	GF	GA	GD	Pts	Qualification
1	Ruch Hajduki Wielkie (C)	18	11	2	5	50	33	+17	24	
2	Wisła Kraków	18	10	2	6	30	24	+6	22	
3	Warta Poznań	18	10	1	7	43	31	+12	21	
4	Garbarnia Kraków	18	9	3	6	32	27	+5	21	
5	Warszawianka	18	9	3	6	30	27	+3	21	
6	Pogoń Lwów	18	9	1	8	36	29	+7	19	
7	Łódzki KS	18	8	3	7	37	32	+5	19	
8	Dąb Katowice	18	7	0	11	29	43	−14	14	
9	Śląsk Świętochłowice (R)	18	4	3	11	21	40	−19	11	Relegated
10	Legia Warsaw (R)	18	3	2	13	24	46	−22	8	Relegated

Source: rsssf.com
(C) Champions; (R) Relegated

==== Match results ====
Ekstraklasa match details
Date	Opponents	Result	Score F–A	Attendance
5 April 1936	Dąb Katowice	W	2–1 (H)	1,000
19 April 1936	Śląsk Świętochłowice	D	1–1 (A)	2,000
26 April 1936	Garbarnia Kraków	D	1–1 (H)	2,500
3 May 1936	Pogoń Lwów	L	1–2 (A)	5,500
10 May 1936	Ruch Hajduki Wielkie	L	2–4 (H)	6,000
17 May 1936	Warta Poznań	L	1–2 (A)	4,000
7 June 1936	Wisła Kraków	L	0–1 (A)	3,000
14 June 1936	Warszawianka	W	2–1 (H)	3,000
21 June 1936	Łódzki KS	L	1–2 (H)	2,000
5 July 1936	Dąb Katowice	L	1–2 (A)	4,500
23 August 1936	Warta Poznań	L	1–5 (H)	2,500
30 August 1936	Garbarnia Kraków	L	2–6 (A)	2,000
20 September 1936	Warszawianka	L	1–2 (A)	3,500
27 September 1936	Pogoń Lwów	L	2–4 (H)	1,500
11 October 1936	Ruch Hajduki Wielkie	L	1–6 (A)	3,000
18 October 1936	Śląsk Świętochłowice	W	2–0 (H)	1,000
25 October 1936	Łódzki KS	L	1–3 (A)	1,500
1 November 1936	Wisła Kraków	L	2–3 (H)	1,000
