= Kacper Skwierczyński =

Polish footballer (born 2003)

Personal information
- Date of birth: 11 January 2003 (age 23)
- Place of birth: Siedlce, Poland
- Height: 1.70 m (5 ft 7 in)
- Position: Winger

Team information
- Current team: Mławianka Mława

Youth career
- –2016: Pogoń Siedlce
- 2016–2021: Legia Warsaw

Senior career*
Years	Team	Apps	(Gls)
2021–2023	Legia Warsaw II	43	(6)
2021–2023	Legia Warsaw	0	(0)
2023–2025	Ruch Chorzów	6	(0)
2024	→ Waterford (loan)	1	(0)
2025	Olimpia Elbląg	14	(0)
2025–2026	Mazovia Mińsk Mazowiecki	29	(1)
2026–	Mławianka Mława	0	(0)
- * Club domestic league appearances and goals as of 10:57, 11 July 2026 (UTC)

Kacper Skwierczyński (born 11 January 2003) is a Polish professional footballer who plays as a winger for III liga club Mławianka Mława.

== Club career ==
=== Legia Warsaw ===
Kacper Skwierczyński made his professional debut for Legia Warsaw on the 22 September 2021, coming on as a half-time substitute for Yuri Ribeiro during a 3–1 away cup win against Wigry Suwałki.

A few months later, he played his first European game, coming on as a substitute during the 0–1 UEFA Europa League loss at home to Spartak Moscow on 9 December 2021.

=== Ruch Chorzów ===
Having only played for Legia's reserve side since his European debut, on 3 January 2023 Skwierczyński signed a two-and-a-half-year contract with I liga club Ruch Chorzów.

==== Loan to Waterford ====
On 24 January 2024, Skwierczyński joined League of Ireland Premier Division club Waterford on loan. He made his debut in a 0–3 league loss to Derry City on 3 June 2024, coming onto the pitch in the 84th minute.

On 22 January 2025, soon after returning from loan, Skwierczyński's contract with Ruch was terminated by mutual consent.

=== Olimpia Elbląg ===
In late February 2025, Skwierczyński joined II liga side Olimpia Elbląg.

== Honours ==
Legia Warsaw II

- Polish Cup (Masovia regionals): 2021–22

Mazovia Mińsk Mazowiecki

- Polish Cup (Siedlce regionals): 2025–26
