= Rui Gomes (footballer, born 1997) =

Portuguese footballer

Personal information
- Full name: Rui Pedro Ribeiro Fernandes Duarte Gomes
- Date of birth: 4 September 1997 (age 29)
- Place of birth: Braga, Portugal
- Height: 1.72 m (5 ft 8 in)
- Position: Winger

Team information
- Current team: Académica de Coimbra
- Number: 23

Youth career
- 2006–2009: Merelinense
- 2009–2012: Braga
- 2012–2014: Benfica
- 2014–2016: Vitória SC

Senior career*
Years	Team	Apps	(Gls)
2015–2018	Vitória Guimarães B	37	(4)
2018–2019	Gil Vicente	22	(5)
2019–2020	Mafra	8	(0)
2020–2021	União Leiria	23	(3)
2021–2022	Legia Warsaw II	13	(2)
2021–2022	Legia Warsaw	1	(0)
2022	Covilhã	16	(2)
2022–2024	Portimonense	33	(1)
2023–2024	→ Tondela (loan)	31	(8)
2024–2025	Chaves	26	(2)
2025–2026	Mérida	15	(1)
2026–	Académica de Coimbra	6	(1)

International career
2016	Portugal U20	1	(1)
- * Club domestic league appearances and goals as of 11 September 2026

Rui Pedro Ribeiro Fernandes Duarte Gomes (born 4 September 1997) is a Portuguese professional footballer who plays as a winger for Liga Portugal 2 club Académica de Coimbra.

== Career ==
On 10 January 2016, Gomes made his professional debut with Vitória SC B in a 2015–16 Segunda Liga match against Santa Clara. He played one match in the Ekstraklasa for Legia Warsaw in their 2021–22 season, on 22 January 2022 moved to Covilhã.
