= Michał Walski =

Polish footballer (born 1997)

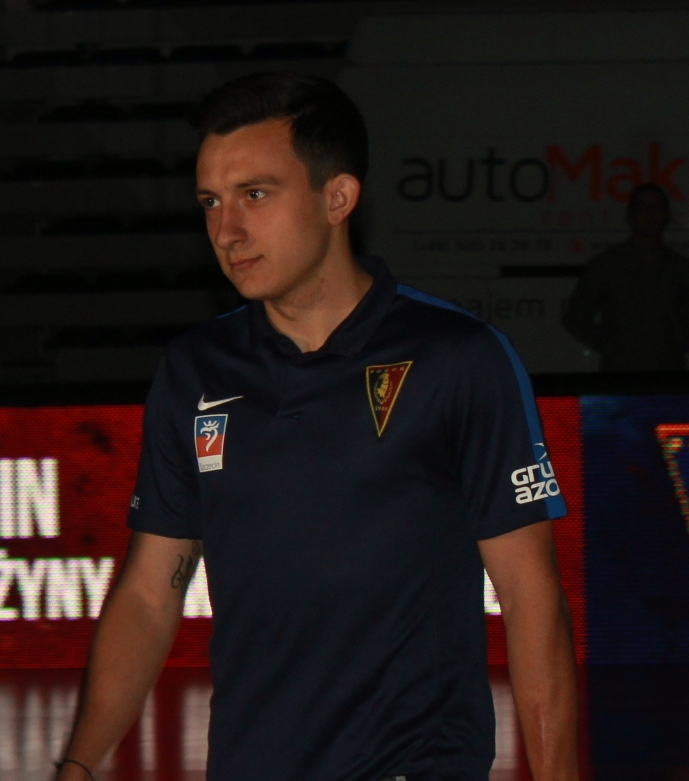
- Walski with Pogoń Szczecin in 2016

Personal information
- Full name: Michał Walski
- Date of birth: 27 February 1997 (age 29)
- Place of birth: Tarnobrzeg, Poland
- Height: 1.68 m (5 ft 6 in)
- Position: Midfielder

Team information
- Current team: Górnik Łęczna
- Number: 16

Youth career
- –2009: Siarka Tarnobrzeg
- 2009–2013: Stal Mielec

Senior career*
| Years | Team | Apps | (Gls) |
| 2013 | Stal Mielec | 13 | (1) |
| 2013–2016 | Pogoń Szczecin II | 33 | (8) |
| 2014–2016 | Pogoń Szczecin | 17 | (0) |
| 2016–2019 | Ruch Chorzów | 56 | (5) |
| 2019–2023 | Sandecja Nowy Sącz | 115 | (11) |
| 2023–2026 | Puszcza Niepołomice | 63 | (4) |
| 2025 | → Stal Stalowa Wola (loan) | 15 | (1) |
| 2026– | Górnik Łęczna | 0 | (0) |

International career
| 2013 | Poland U16 | 4 | (1) |
| 2013–2014 | Poland U17 | 8 | (1) |
| 2014–2015 | Poland U18 | 7 | (1) |
- * Club domestic league appearances and goals as of 20:32, 26 May 2026 (UTC)

Michał Walski (born 27 February 1997) is a Polish professional footballer who plays as a central midfielder for II liga club Górnik Łęczna.

== Career ==
On 8 January 2025, Walski was loaned from Ekstraklasa side Puszcza Niepołomice to the second-tier Stal Stalowa Wola for half a year.

On 18 June 2026, he signed a two-year contract with II liga club Górnik Łęczna.

== Honours ==
Stal Mielec

- III liga Lublin–Subcarpathia: 2012–13
