= II liga =

- Organising body: PZPN
- Founded: 26 February 1966; 60 years ago 1948–1950 (as A klasa); 1951–1952 (as Klasa wojewódzka); 1953–1956 (as Liga międzywojewódzka); 1957–1966 (as Liga okręgowa); 1966–2008 (as III liga); 2008– (as II liga)
- Country: Poland
- Confederation: UEFA
- Number of clubs: 18
- Level on pyramid: 3
- Promotion to: I liga
- Relegation to: III liga
- Domestic cup: Polish Cup
- Current champions: Unia Skierniewice (2026–27)
- Broadcaster(s): TVP Sport
- Sponsor(s): Betclic
- Website: laczynas2liga.pl
- Current: 2026–27 II liga

II liga (Druga liga, Polish pronunciation: [ˈdruɡa ˈliɡa], lit. 'Second League'), currently named Betclic II liga due to its sponsorship by Betclic, is a Polish football league that sits at the third tier of the Polish football league system. Until the end of the 2007–08 season, II Liga referred to a league at the 2nd tier, although this changed with the formation of the Ekstraklasa as the top level league in Poland. Currently, II liga is below I liga and above III liga.

Since the 2014–15 season, the league consists of a single division, unlike previous seasons when it was divided into two groups, West and East. The league consists of 18 teams.

The top two finishers are rewarded with automatic promotion to the I liga, while the teams ranked third to sixth face each other in promotion play-offs. Teams who finish 13th and 14th compete in the promotion/relegation play-offs against III liga group winners, and the last four teams are automatically relegated to the fourth division.

== Clubs ==
The following 18 clubs are competing in the II liga during the 2026–27 season.

Location of teams in 2026–27 II liga.

Note: Table lists in alphabetical order.

Team	Location	Venue	Capacity
Avia Świdnik	Świdnik	Czesław Krygier Municipal Stadium	2,886
Chojniczanka Chojnice	Chojnice	Chojniczanka 1930 Municipal Stadium	2,923
GKS Tychy	Tychy	Tychy Stadium	15,150
Górnik Łęczna	Łęczna	Górnik Łęczna Stadium	7,464
Hutnik Kraków	Kraków	Suche Stawy Stadium	6,000
Lechia Zielona Góra	Zielona Góra	MOSiR Stadium	1,000
Legia Warsaw II	Książenice	Legia Training Center	1,000
Olimpia Grudziądz	Grudziądz	Bronisław Malinowski Stadium	5,323
Podhale Nowy Targ	Nowy Targ	Marshal Józef Piłsudski Stadium	900
Rekord Bielsko-Biała	Bielsko-Biała	Centrum Sportu REKORD	593
Resovia Rzeszów	Rzeszów	Stal Stadium^{1} Subcarpathian Athletic Center	11,547; 8,000
Sandecja Nowy Sącz	Nowy Sącz	Sandecja Stadium	8,111
Sokół Kleczew	Kleczew	OSiR Stadium	800
Stal Stalowa Wola	Stalowa Wola	Subcarpathian Football Center	3,764
Śląsk Wrocław II	Wrocław	Oporowska Stadium	8,346
Świt Szczecin	Szczecin	Obiekt Sportowy Skolwin	974
Zawisza Bydgoszcz	Bydgoszcz	Zdzisław Krzyszkowiak Stadium	20,187
Znicz Pruszków	Pruszków	MZOS Stadium	1,977

1. Due to the renovation of the Resovia Stadium in Rzeszów, Resovia play their home games at the Stal Stadium. However, it is expected for them to play in a new stadium by the end of 2026.

== History ==
The history of II Liga, or the third level of Polish football system, dates back to the Second Polish Republic. In 1927, the Ekstraklasa, also called State League (Liga Państwowa) was established. Below the Ekstraklasa, there were several regional A Classes, which in most cases covered the territory of one Voivodeship (see Lower Level Football Leagues in Interwar Poland). Further below, there were B Classes (usually covering two-three counties), and, in the regions with enough football teams, C Classes (covering one county).

On 29 June 1945 in Kraków, officials of the Polish Football Association (PZPN) established three-tier system of regional championships in Poland. The first level was, following the pre-1939 pattern, A Classes, followed by B Classes, and C Classes. This system remained in use until 1951, when in March 1952, it was replaced by four classes, 1st, 2nd, 3rd and 4th. Meanwhile, the number of teams in the second level of Polish tier was reduced from 40 to 14 (March 1953), which meant that as many as 26 teams were automatically relegated to the third level. As a result, there were 93 teams in the third level, divided into 8 groups. Six of these groups covered more than one voivodeship, while two groups (Katowice and Kraków) covered only their provinces, due to the football potential in those regions. After the regular season, 8 winners played each other in two-level playoffs, with two winners winning promotion to the second level.

On 13 February 1955, in Warsaw, Third League was officially formed, with four groups. This idea was abandoned after a month, due to financial reasons. Instead, in 1956, the Regional Leagues were established, with 15 groups. In 1960, Polish football switched from spring-autumn to autumn-spring system. First games of the new system took place on 19 August 1960. 26 February 1966, PZPN decided to reduce the number of groups to 4, with 16 teams in each. The Macroregional League, as it was called at that time, existed in that form until 1973, when Polish football officials decided to reintroduce the Regional Leagues, with 20 groups (since 1974 - 24 groups). In 1976, 8 groups were established, with 112 teams. In 1980, the number of groups was reduced to 4, but in 1982, again 8 groups were established. The system of 8 groups of the third level remained unchanged until 1998, with the exception of 1989–90, when there were four groups.

=== The number of third level groups ===
- 1945 – 1951: 14 (1950: 17)
- 1952: 17
- 1953 – 1956: 8 (1956: 9)
- 1957 – 1965–66: 15 (1958: 16, 1959: 17, 1960: 18)
- 1966–67 – 1972–73: 4
- 1973–74 – 1975–76: 20 (1974–75: 24)
- 1976–77 – 1979–80: 8
- 1980–81 – 1981–82: 4
- 1982–83 – 1996–97: 8
- 1997–98 – 2007–08: 4
- 2008–09 – 2013–14: 2
- since 2014–15: 1

== Champions of the Polish third level since 2008 reform ==
- 2008–09: MKS Kluczbork, KSZO Ostrowiec Świętokrzyski
- 2009–10: Ruch Radzionków, Bruk-Bet Termalica Nieciecza
- 2010–11: Olimpia Grudziądz, Olimpia Elbląg
- 2011–12: Miedź Legnica, Okocimski KS Brzesko
- 2012–13: ROW 1964 Rybnik, Wisła Płock
- 2013–14: Chrobry Głogów, Wigry Suwałki
- 2014–15: MKS Kluczbork
- 2015–16: Stal Mielec
- 2016–17: Raków Częstochowa

- 2017–18: GKS Jastrzębie
- 2018–19: Radomiak Radom
- 2019–20: Górnik Łęczna
- 2020–21: Górnik Polkowice
- 2021–22: Stal Rzeszów
- 2022–23: Polonia Warsaw
- 2023–24: Pogoń Siedlce
- 2024–25: Polonia Bytom
- 2025–26: Unia Skierniewice

== See also ==
- Lower Level Football Leagues in Interwar Poland
