= Itaka Arena =

Football stadium in Poland

Coordinates: 50.6858°N 17.8740°E

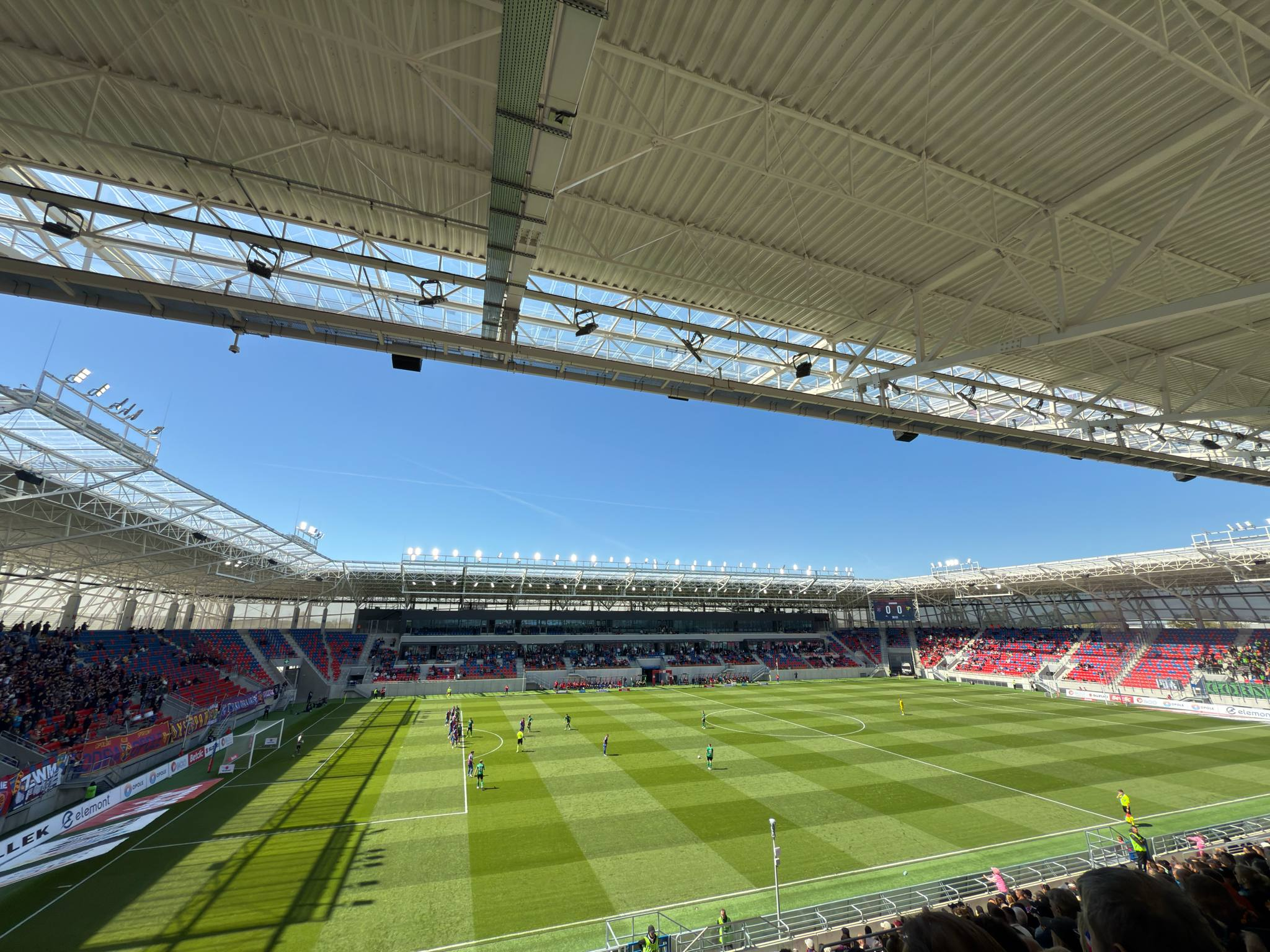
- Interactive map of Itaka Arena
- Location: Opole, ul. Leonarda Olejnika 1, Poland
- Owner: Zakład Komunalny w Opolu
- Capacity: 11,600
- Record attendance: 11,600; Odra Opole v Magdeburg (21 March 2025)

Construction
- Built: 2024
- Opened: 2025

Tenant
- Odra Opole

Stadion Miejski "Odra" or Itaka Arena is a football stadium in Opole, Poland. It is the home ground of Odra Opole. The venue holds up to 11,600 people and was opened in 2025.

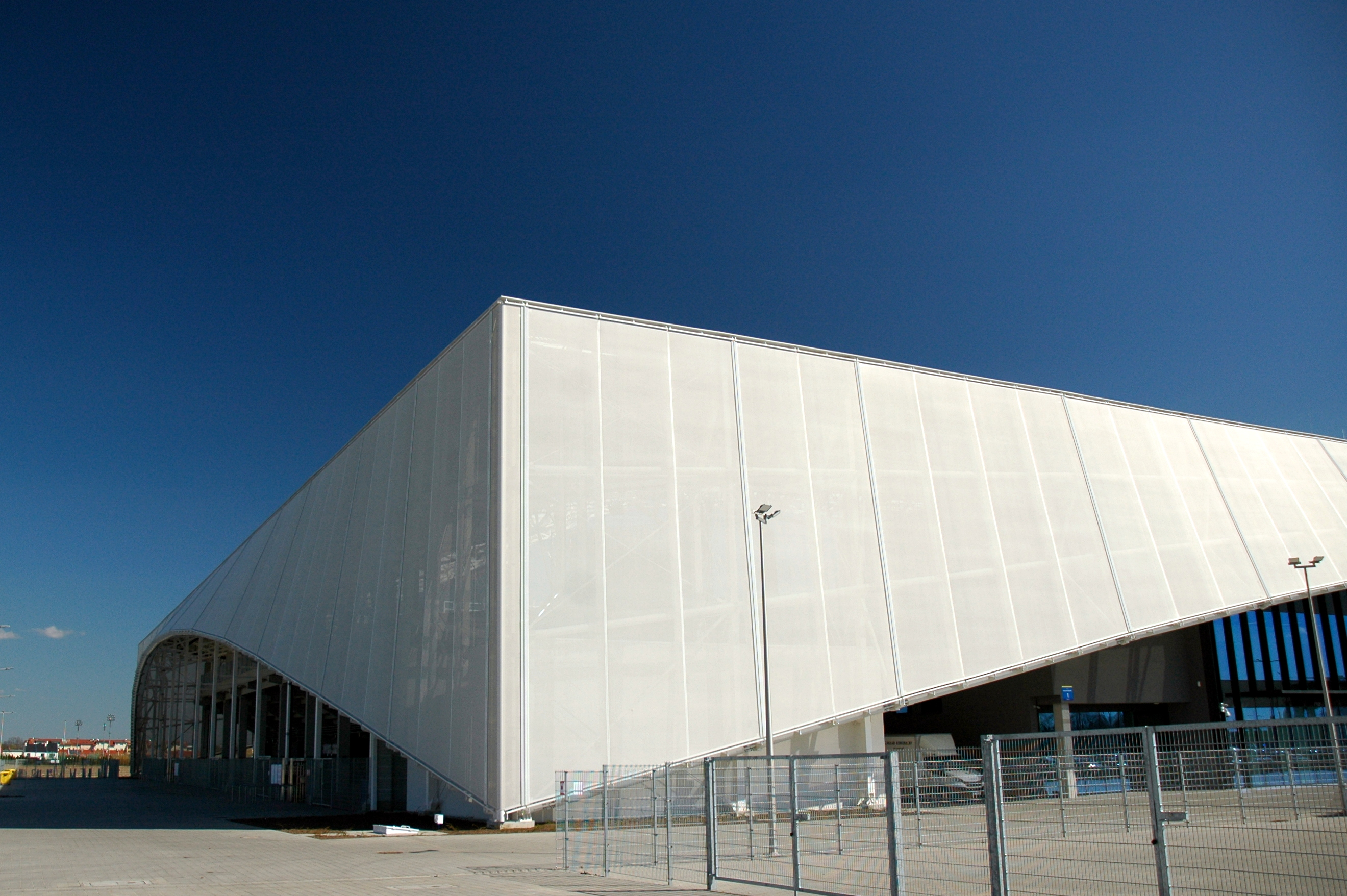
Itaka Arena exterior
