= Radosław Cielemęcki =

Polish footballer

Personal information
- Date of birth: 19 February 2003 (age 23)
- Place of birth: Świebodzice, Poland
- Height: 1.73 m (5 ft 8 in)
- Position: Midfielder

Team information
- Current team: Mazovia Mińsk Mazowiecki

Youth career
- –2013: Polonia Świdnica
- 2013–2015: Górnik Wałbrzych
- 2015–2016: Górnik Nowe Miasto Wałbrzych
- 2016–2019: Legia Warsaw

Senior career*
Years	Team	Apps	(Gls)
2019–2021	Legia Warsaw II	51	(7)
2020–2021	Legia Warsaw	2	(0)
2021–2024	Wisła Płock	31	(1)
2024–2025	Radomiak Radom	8	(0)
2025–2026	Podhale Nowy Targ	16	(0)
2026–	Mazovia Mińsk Mazowiecki	0	(0)

International career
2017	Poland U15	2	(0)
2018	Poland U16	12	(1)
2019	Poland U17	6	(2)
2022–2023	Poland U20	2	(0)
- * Club domestic league appearances and goals as of 11:01, 31 May 2026 (UTC)

Radosław Cielemęcki (born 19 February 2003) is a Polish professional footballer who plays as a midfielder for III liga club Mazovia Mińsk Mazowiecki.

== Honours ==
Legia Warsaw II

- Polish Cup (Masovia regionals): 2018–19

Wisła Płock II

- IV liga Masovia: 2023–24
- Polish Cup (Płock regionals): 2023–24
