= Kleczew =

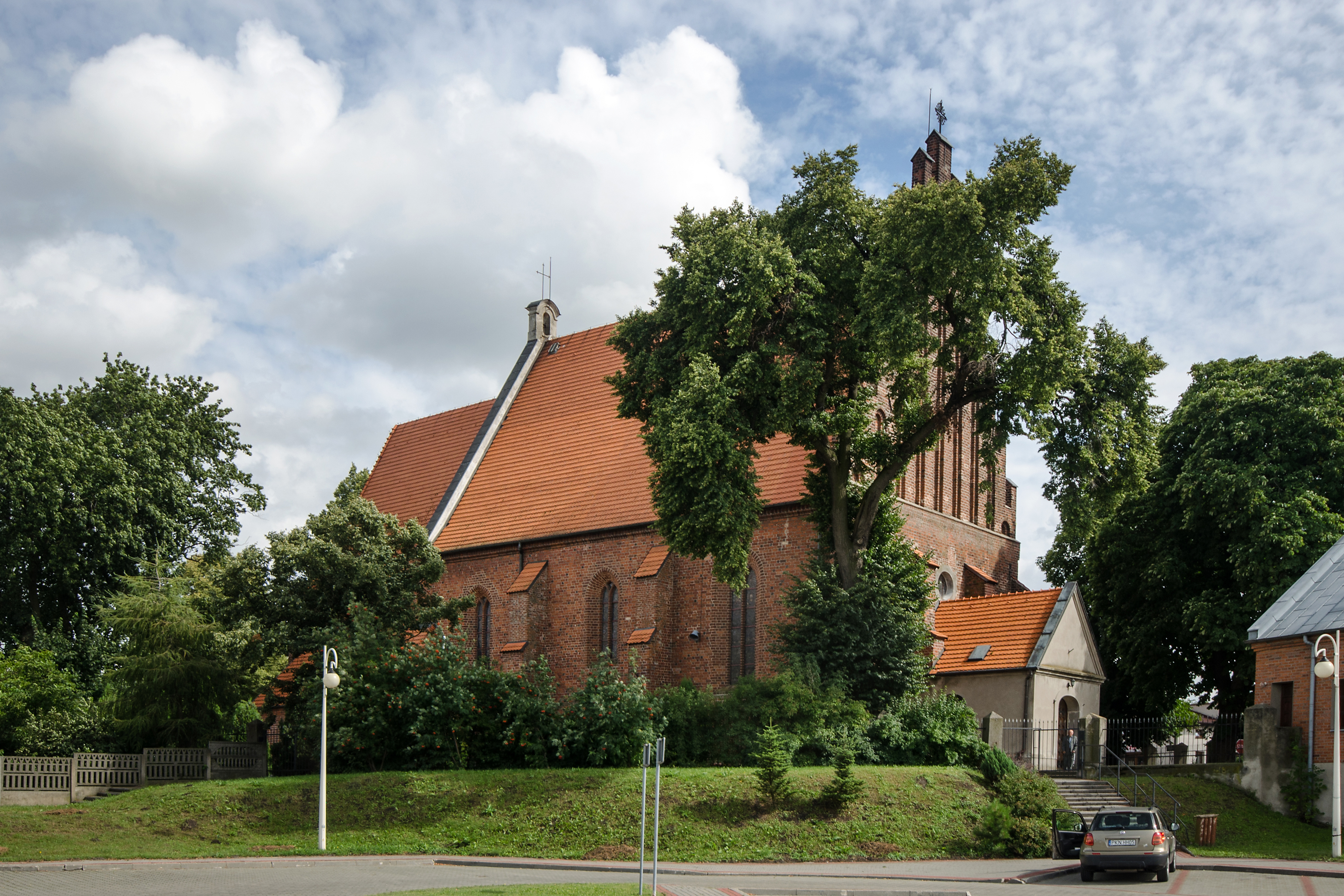
- Saint Andrew Church

- Flag Coat of arms

- Location within Poland
- Coordinates: 52°22′16″N 18°10′35″E
- Country: Poland
- Voivodeship: Greater Poland
- County: Konin
- Gmina: Kleczew
- Town rights: 1366

Area
  - Total: 6.68 km^{2} (2.58 sq mi)

Population (2006)
  - Total: 4,173
  - Density: 625/km^{2} (1,620/sq mi)
- Time zone: UTC+1 (CET)
  - Summer (DST): UTC+2 (CEST)
- Postal code: 62-540
- Vehicle registration: PKN
- Website: http://www.kleczew.pl

Kleczew ([ˈklɛt͡ʂɛf]; German: Lehmstädt) is a town in Konin County, Greater Poland Voivodeship, central Poland.

== History ==
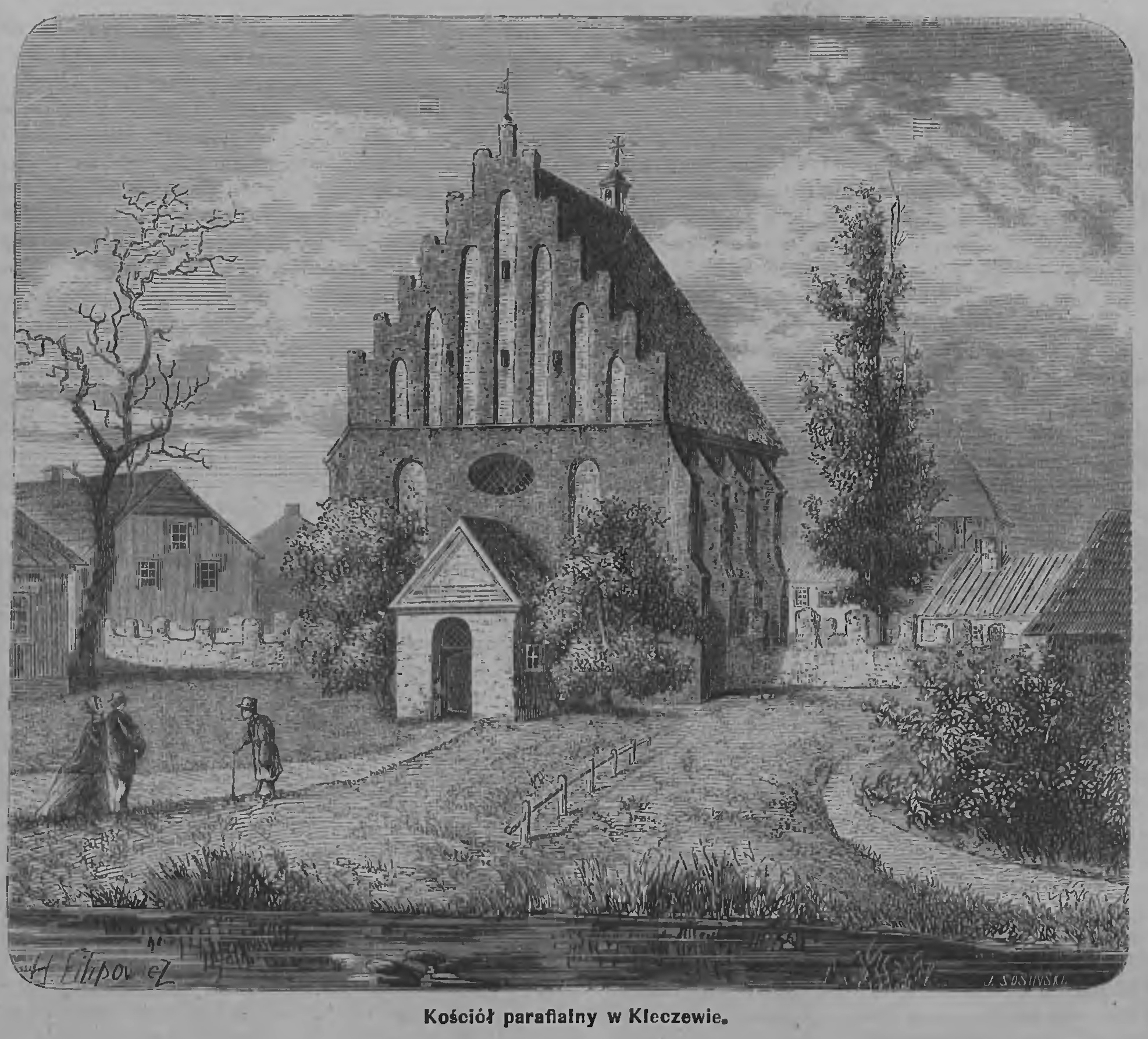
19th-century view of the Saint Andrew Church

Kleczew received town rights in 1366. It was a private town administratively located in the Konin County in the Kalisz Voivodeship in the Greater Poland Province of the Kingdom of Poland. A route connecting Warsaw with Poznań and Dresden ran through the town in the 18th century and King Augustus III of Poland often traveled that route. According to the 1921 census, the town had a population of 2,744, 87.1% Polish and 12.7% Jewish by declared nationality.

Following the joint German-Soviet invasion of Poland, which started World War II in September 1939, the town was occupied by Germany until 1945. A local Polish teacher was among the victims of a massacre of Poles, committed by the Germans in Konin on 10 November 1939 as part of the Intelligenzaktion. The Polish resistance movement was active in Kleczew. Polish underground press was distributed in the town.

== Demographics ==
Historical population

Year	Pop.	±%
1857	1,760	—
1871	1,987	+12.9%
1890	2,044	+2.9%
1897	2,371	+16.0%
1910	3,557	+50.0%
1921	2,744	−22.9%

Year	Pop.	±%
1931	2,946	+7.4%
1939	3,474	+17.9%
1950	1,956	−43.7%
1960	2,141	+9.5%
2010	4,232	+97.7%

== Sports ==
The local association football team is Sokół Kleczew.
