= Dmytro Yefimenko =

Ukrainian footballer

Personal information
- Full name: Dmytro Oleksandrovych Yefimenko
- Date of birth: 30 August 2001 (age 25)
- Place of birth: Ukraine
- Height: 1.81 m (5 ft 11 in)
- Position: Right winger

Team information
- Current team: Kluczevia Stargard
- Number: 88

Youth career
- 2013–2018: Dynamo Kyiv

Senior career*
Years	Team	Apps	(Gls)
2018–2021	Dynamo Kyiv	0	(0)
2021–2022	Uzhhorod	4	(0)
2022–2023	LZS Starowice Dolne	7	(0)
2023	Star Starachowice	12	(4)
2024	Piast Żmigród	12	(10)
2024–2025	Vineta Wolin	16	(5)
2025	Flota Świnoujście	14	(9)
2025–	Kluczevia Stargard	32	(11)
- * Club domestic league appearances and goals as of 22:30, 3 June 2026 (UTC)

Dmytro Oleksandrovych Yefimenko (Ukrainian: Дмитро Олександрович Єфіменко; born 30 August 2001) is a Ukrainian professional footballer who plays as a right winger for Polish III liga club Kluczevia Stargard.

== Honours ==
Star Starachowice

- IV liga Świętokrzyskie: 2022–23

Flota Świnoujście

- Polish Cup (West Pomerania regionals): 2024–25

Kluczevia Stargard

- Polish Cup (West Pomerania regionals): 2025–26
