= Yehor Matsenko =

Ukrainian footballer

Personal information
- Full name: Yehor Hennadiyovych Matsenko
- Date of birth: 23 January 2002 (age 24)
- Place of birth: Lysianka, Cherkasy Oblast, Ukraine
- Height: 1.88 m (6 ft 2 in)
- Position: Left-back

Team information
- Current team: Śląsk Wrocław
- Number: 33

Youth career
- 2015–2018: Dynamo Kyiv
- 2018–2019: Ursus Warsaw
- 2019–2020: Legia Warsaw

Senior career*
Years	Team	Apps	(Gls)
2020–2022	Legia Warsaw II	30	(1)
2022–2025	Śląsk Wrocław II	29	(3)
2023–	Śląsk Wrocław	80	(10)

International career
2024	Ukraine U23	1	(0)
- * Club domestic league appearances and goals as of 19:11, 11 November 2026 (UTC)

Yehor Matsenko (Ukrainian: Єгор Геннадійович Маценко; born 23 January 2002) is a Ukrainian professional footballer who plays as a left-back for Ekstraklasa club Śląsk Wrocław.

== Club career ==
Born in Lysianka, Cherkasy Oblast, Matsenko began his career in the Dynamo Kyiv academy, before transferring to Poland at the age of 16, where he joined the Ursus Warsaw, and later, the Legia Warsaw academies.

In February 2022 he was signed by another Ekstraklasa club, Śląsk Wrocław. After spending a year and a half with the reserves, Matsenko made his debut for the senior team in a 3–1 home league win over Lech Poznań on 20 March 2023.

== International career ==
On 6 March 2024, Matsenko was called up by Ruslan Rotan to the Ukraine Olympic football team preliminary squad in preparation for the 2024 Summer Olympics. On 25 March, he made his debut as a second-half substitute in a 2–0 loss to Japan.

== Honours ==
Śląsk Wrocław II

- III liga, group III: 2024–25
