= Książenice, Masovian Voivodeship =

Książenice
- Village
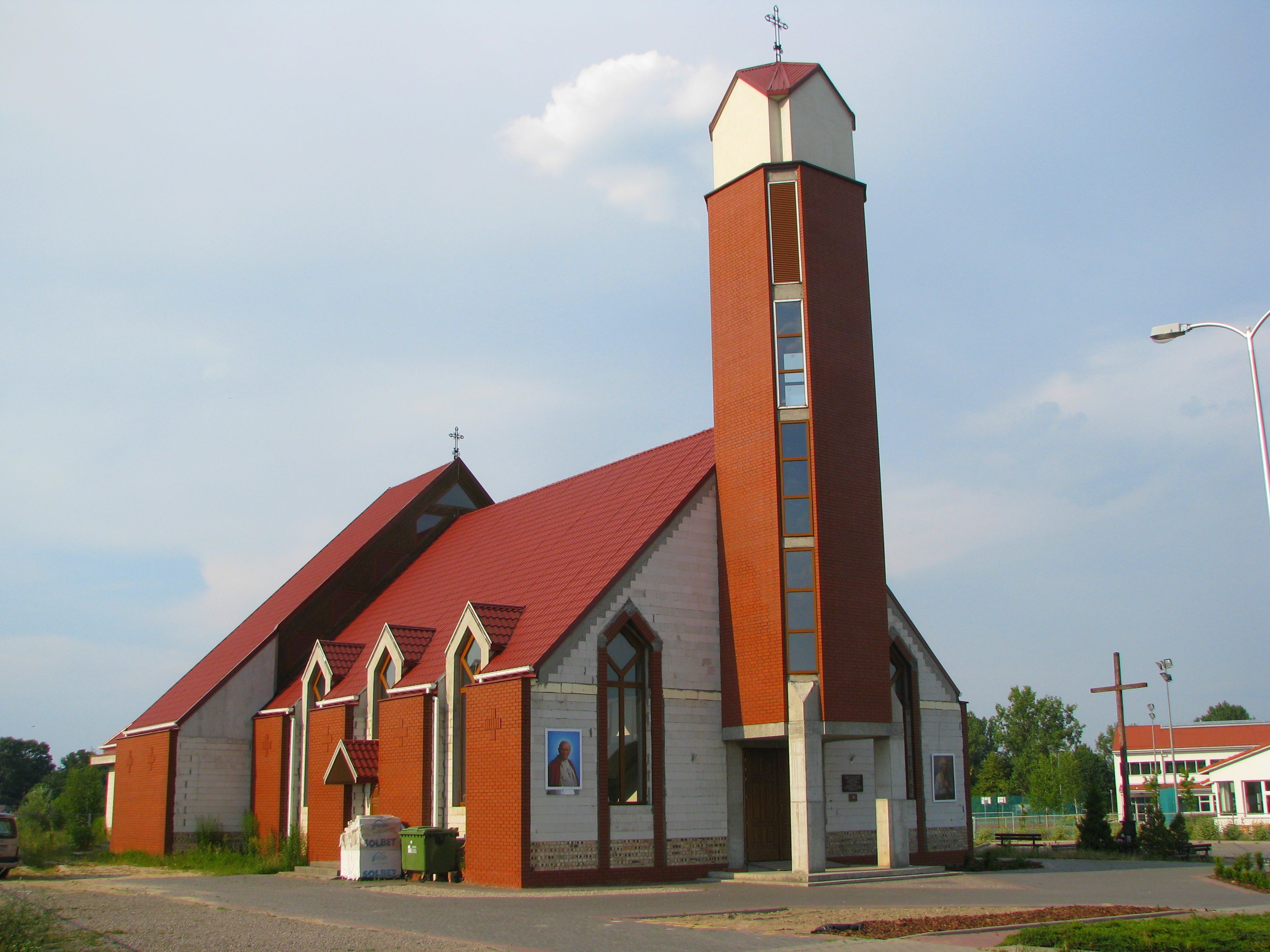
- Church of Saint John Maria Vianney

- Location within Poland
- Coordinates: 52°04′39″N 20°41′47″E
- Country: Poland
- Voivodeship: Masovian
- County: Grodzisk
- Gmina: Grodzisk Mazowiecki
- Time zone: UTC+1 (CET)
  - Summer (DST): UTC+2 (CEST)
- Vehicle registration: WGM

Książenice [kɕɔ̃ʐɛˈnit͡sɛ] is a village in the administrative district of Gmina Grodzisk Mazowiecki, within Grodzisk County, Masovian Voivodeship, in east-central Poland.

In the village there is located the Legia Training Center for the Legia Warsaw first team and their reserves and youth teams, as U18, U17, U16 and U15. The center facilities are, among others, eight pitches; six with natural turf and two with artificial turf, hotel part and dormitory for players aged 13–18.

In the 19th century, Książenice was often visited by poet Kazimierz Brodziński.
