= Łęczna Stadium =

Football stadium in Łęczna, Poland

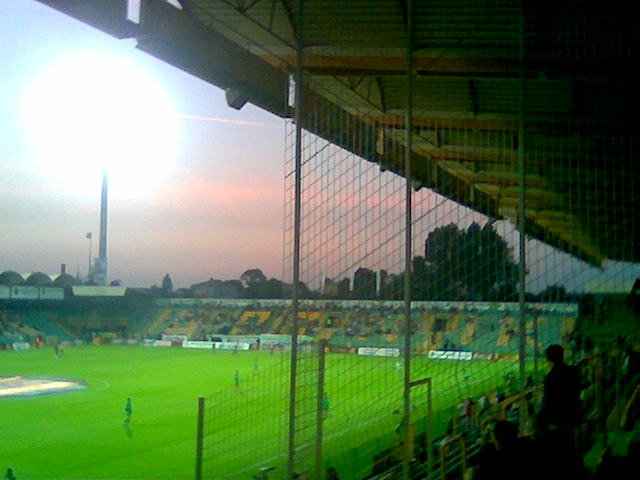
- Interactive map of Łęczna Stadium
- Location: Al. Jana Pawła II 13; 21-010 Łęczna, Poland
- Coordinates: 51°18′6″N 22°52′34″E
- Owner: City of Łęczna
- Capacity: 7,200
- Surface: Natural

Construction
- Built: 2003
- Opened: 2003

Tenants
- Górnik Łęczna, Górnik Łęczna (women)

The Stadion Górnika Łęczna is a football stadium in Łęczna, Poland. It is the home stadium of Górnik Łęczna. The stadium has a capacity of 7,200 people. The stadium also has a heated pitch as of 2006.
