= 2017–18 Lechia Gdańsk season =

Lechia Gdańsk
2017–18 season
- Manager: Piotr Nowak (-Sep 27) Adam Owen (Sep 27 – Mar 3) Piotr Stokowiec (Mar 5-)
- Stadium: Stadion Energa Gdańsk
- Ekstraklasa: 13th
- Polish Cup: Round of 32
- Top goalscorer: League: Marco Paixão (16 goals); All: Marco Paixão (16 goals)
- Highest home attendance: 22,871 vs Arka Gdynia
- Lowest home attendance: 2,235 vs Termalica Nieciecza
Home colours	Away colours	Third colours

The 2017–18 Ekstraklasa season was Lechia's 74th since their creation, and was their 10th continuous season in the top league of Polish football.

The season covered the period from 1 July 2017 to 30 June 2018.

== Players ==
=== First-team squad ===
Note: Flags indicate national team as defined under FIFA eligibility rules; some limited exceptions apply. Players may hold more than one non-FIFA nationality.

No.	Pos.	Nation	Player
1	GK	SRB	Dušan Kuciak
2	DF	CRO	Mato Miloš
3	DF	POL	Jakub Wawrzyniak
4	DF	BRA	Gerson
5	DF	CAN	Steven Vitória
6	MF	BUL	Simeon Slavchev
7	MF	SRB	Miloš Krasić
8	MF	POR	Romário Baldé
9	MF	POL	Patryk Lipski
10	MF	POL	Sebastian Mila
10	FW	IDN	Egy Maulana
11	FW	POL	Grzegorz Kuświk
13	DF	POL	Mateusz Lewandowski
16	MF	POL	Ariel Borysiuk
17	MF	SVK	Lukáš Haraslín
19	FW	POR	Marco Paixão
20	DF	POL	Adam Chrzanowski

No.	Pos.	Nation	Player
21	MF	POL	Sławomir Peszko
22	DF	SRB	Filip Mladenović
23	DF	POL	Grzegorz Wojtkowiak
25	DF	POL	Michał Nalepa
26	DF	POL	Błażej Augustyn
27	MF	POL	Rafał Wolski
28	MF	POR	Flávio Paixão
29	MF	POL	Karol Fila
29	FW	POL	Mateusz Żukowski
30	DF	POR	João Aniceto Grandela Nunes
31	MF	POL	Florian Schikowski
32	MF	POL	Mateusz Matras
33	GK	CRO	Oliver Zelenika
35	MF	POL	Daniel Łukasik
41	DF	POL	Paweł Stolarski
71	GK	POL	Maciej Woźniak
96	MF	POR	João Pedro Abreu de Oliveira

=== Transfers ===
==== Players In ====
No.	Pos.	Player	From	Type	Window	Fee	Date	Source
31	MF	Florian Schikowski	Borussia Mönchengladbach	Transfer	Summer	Free	1 July 2017	
25	DF	Michał Nalepa	Ferencvárosi TC	Transfer	Summer	Free	1 July 2017	
13	DF	Mateusz Lewandowski	Pogoń Szczecin	Transfer	Summer	Free	1 July 2017	
32	DF	Mateusz Matras	Pogoń Szczecin	Transfer	Summer	Free	1 July 2017	
26	DF	Błażej Augustyn	Ascoli Calcio	Transfer	Summer	Free	6 August 2017	
9	MF	Patryk Lipski	Ruch Chorzów	Transfer	Summer	Free	12 August 2017	
96	MF	João Oliveira	FC Luzern	Loan	Summer	–	15 August 2017	
8	FW	Romário Baldé	Benfica	Transfer	Summer	Free	25 August 2017	
6	MF	Simeon Slavchev	Sporting CP	Loan	Summer	–	30 August 2017	
2	DF	Mato Miloš	Benfica	Loan	Summer	–	31 August 2017	
16	MF	Ariel Borysiuk	Queens Park Rangers	Transfer	Winter	Free	26 January 2018	
22	DF	Filip Mladenović	Standard Liège	Transfer	Winter	Free	27 January 2018	
		12 players				€0k		

==== Players Out ====
No.	Pos.	Player	To	Type	Window	Fee	Date	Source
32	GK	Vanja Milinković-Savić	Torino F.C.	Transfer	Summer	€2.3 million	1 July 2017	
–	MF	Maciej Makuszewski	Lech Poznań	Transfer	Summer	€270K	1 July 2017	
–	DF	Adam Dźwigała	Wisła Płock	Transfer	Summer	Free	1 July 2017	
20	MF	Michał Chrapek	Śląsk Wrocław	Transfer	Summer	Free	1 June 2017	
9	MF	Michał Mak	Śląsk Wrocław	Loan	Summer	–	12 July 2017	
2	DF	Rafał Janicki	Lech Poznań	Loan	Summer	–	14 July 2017	
4	MF	Aleksandar Kovačević	FK Haugesund	Transfer	Summer	€70K	10 August 2017	
13	DF	Mateusz Lewandowski	Śląsk Wrocław	Loan	Winter	–	30 January 2018	
		8 players				€2.64m		

==== Retired ====
No.	Pos.	Player	Date
10	MF	Sebastian Mila	30 July 2018

== Friendlies ==
=== Summer ===
1 July 2017	Lechia Gdańsk	3–2	Chojniczanka Chojnice	Gniewino
16:00 BST	Grzegorz Kuświk 20'; Florian Schikowski 73'; Mateusz Lewandowski 77'		Mario Maloča 57 (OG)' Tomasz Mikołajczak 61'	Stadium: Stadion Miejski

4 July 2017	Lechia Gdańsk	3–2	Sandecja Nowy Sącz	Gniewino
9:00 BST	Aleksandar Kovačević 57', 76'; Mateusz Lewandowski 67'		Aleksandar Kolev 45'; Michal Piter-Bučko 55'	Stadium: Stadion Miejski

11 November 2017	Bałtyk Gdynia	0–5	Lechia Gdańsk	Gdynia
9:00 BST			Romário Baldé 11'; Marco Paixão 17'; Flávio Paixão 24'; Grzegorz Kuświk 83', 88'	Stadium: Stadion GOSiR

=== Winter ===
20 January 2018	Qarabağ FK	1–1	Lechia Gdańsk	Belek
11:30 BST	Dani Quintana 60'		Flávio Paixão 85'	Stadium: IC Hotels Football Center – Pitch A

21 January 2018	CS Universitatea Craiova	1–0	Lechia Gdańsk	Belek
13:00 BST	Gustavo Vagenin 33' (pen.)			Stadium: IC Hotels Football Center – Pitch A

28 January 2018	Lechia Gdańsk	4–1	Pogoń Siedlce	Gdańsk
15:30 BST	Sławomir Peszko 34'; Marco Paixão 61'; Rafał Wolski 71'; Przemysław Macierzyński 89' (pen.)		Grzegorz Tomasiewicz 64' (pen.)	Stadium: MOSiR Stadium

3 February 2018	Lechia Gdańsk	1–0	Chojniczanka Chojnice	Gdańsk
13:00 BST	Sławomir Peszko 58'			Stadium: MOSiR Stadium

== Regular season ==
=== Fixtures for the 2017–18 Ekstraklasa season ===
14 July 2017 1	Wisła Płock	0–2	Lechia Gdańsk	Płock
17:00 BST	Dominik Furman (red card) 56'		Marco Paixão 24' Mateusz Matras 37'	Stadium: Kazimierz Górski Stadium

22 July 2017 2	Lechia Gdańsk	0–1	Cracovia	Gdańsk
17:00 BST			Michał Helik 68'	Stadium: Stadion Energa Gdańsk

28 July 2017 3	Śląsk Wrocław	3–2	Lechia Gdańsk	Wrocław
19:30 BST	Piotr Celeban 5', 80'; Jakub Kosecki 30'		Marco Paixão 48', 52'	Stadium: Stadion Miejski

5 August 2017 4	Lechia Gdańsk	1–1	Górnik Zabrze	Gdańsk
14:30 BST	Marco Paixão 57' (pen.)		Igor Angulo 39'	Stadium: Stadion Energa Gdańsk

14 August 2017 5	Pogoń Szczecin	0–0	Lechia Gdańsk	Szczecin
17:00 BST				Stadium: Stadion Florian Krygier

18 August 2017 6	Lechia Gdańsk	2–3	Sandecja Nowy Sącz	Gdańsk
17:00 BST	Marco Paixão 51'; Sławomir Peszko 55'		Bartłomiej Dudzic 16', 43'; Wojciech Trochim 78'	Stadium: Stadion Energa Gdańsk

26 August 2017 7	Wisła Kraków	1–1	Lechia Gdańsk	Kraków
19:30 BST	Carlitos 79'		João Pedro Abreu de Oliveira 42'	Stadium: Stadion Miejski

11 September 2017 8	Piast Gliwice	1–2	Lechia Gdańsk	Piast
17:00 BST	Stojan Vranješ 30'		Marco Paixão 11'; Romário Baldé 87'; Simeon Slavchev (red card) 40'	Stadium: Stadion Piast

28 September 2017 9	Lechia Gdańsk	3–3	Jagiellonia Białystok	Gdańsk
17:00 BST	Błażej Augustyn 11'; Marco Paixão 59', 90+3'		Błażej Augustyn 24 (OG)'; Przemysław Frankowski 29'; Fedor Černych 49'	Stadium: Stadion Energa Gdańsk

23 September 2017 10	Bruk-Bet Termalica Nieciecza	2–1	Lechia Gdańsk	Nieciecza
14:30 BST	Bartosz Szeliga 48'; Gabriel Iancu 90+7' (pen.)		Rafał Wolski 60'; Romário Baldé (red card) 88'	Stadium: Stadion Termaliki Bruk-Bet

30 September 2017 11	Lechia Gdańsk	1–0	Zagłębie Lubin	Gdańsk
14:30 BST	Flávio Paixão 60'			Stadium: Stadion Energa Gdańsk

15 October 2017 12	Legia Warsaw	1–0	Lechia Gdańsk	Warsaw
17:00 BST	Jarosław Niezgoda 6'			Stadium: Polish Army Stadium

21 October 2017 13	Lechia Gdańsk	3–3	Lech Poznań	Gdańsk
19:30 BST	Błażej Augustyn 13'; Marco Paixão 45+6' (pen.); Emir Dilaver 77 (OG)'; Michał Nalepa (red card) 52'		Maciej Gajos 37'; Christian Gytkjær 70'; Maciej Makuszewski 72'; Mihai Răduț (red card) 74'	Stadium: Stadion Energa Gdańsk

30 October 2017 14	Lechia Gdańsk	0–5	Korona Kielce	Gdańsk
15:00 BST			Nika Kacharava 26', 44'; Maciej Górski 31'; Bartosz Rymaniak 39'; Elia Soriano 74'	Stadium: Stadion Energa Gdańsk

3 November 2017 15	Arka Gdynia	0–1	Lechia Gdańsk	Gdynia
19:30 BST			Flávio Paixão 90+5'	Stadium: Stadion GOSiR

18 November 2017 16	Lechia Gdańsk	3–0	Wisła Płock	Gdańsk
19:30 GMT	Marco Paixão 3', 45+2'; Miloš Krasić 17'		Igor Łasicki (red card) 74'	Stadium: Stadion Energa Gdańsk

24 November 2017 17	Cracovia	2–1	Lechia Gdańsk	Kraków
17:00 GMT	Krzysztof Piątek 72', 90+7'		Michał Helik 64 (OG)'; Grzegorz Wojtkowiak (red card) 90+10'	Stadium: Marshal Józef Piłsudski Stadium

1 December 2017 18	Lechia Gdańsk	3–1	Śląsk Wrocław	Gdańsk
19:30 GMT	Marco Paixão 40', 80'; Flávio Paixão 56' (pen.)		Łukasz Madej 82'	Stadium: Stadion Energa Gdańsk

8 December 2017 19	Górnik Zabrze	1–1	Lechia Gdańsk	Zabrze
19:30 GMT	Dani Suárez 48'		Flávio Paixão 70'	Stadium: Ernest Pohl Stadium

13 December 2017 20	Lechia Gdańsk	1–3	Pogoń Szczecin	Gdańsk
17:00 GMT	Marco Paixão 83'		Adam Frączczak 17', 72' (pen.); Jakub Piotrowski 33'	Stadium: Stadion Energa Gdańsk

16 December 2017 21	Sandecja Nowy Sącz	2–2	Lechia Gdańsk	Nowy Sącz
17:00 GMT	Aleksandar Kolev 16'; Patrik Mráz 90+2'		Flávio Paixão 51'; João Pedro Abreu de Oliveira 87'	Stadium: Władysław Augustynek Stadium

10 February 2018 22	Lechia Gdańsk	1–1	Wisła Kraków	Gdańsk
19:30 GMT	Sławomir Peszko 33'		Carlitos 15'	Stadium: Stadion Energa Gdańsk

18 February 2018 23	Lechia Gdańsk	0–2	Piast Gliwice	Gdańsk
14:30 GMT			Mateusz Szczepaniak 63'; Michal Papadopulos 90+3'	Stadium: Stadion Energa Gdańsk

23 February 2018 24	Jagiellonia Białystok	4–1	Lechia Gdańsk	Białystok
19:30 GMT	Piotr Wlazło 28'; Roman Bezjak 42'; Martin Pospíšil 53'; Karol Świderski 90+2'		Flávio Paixão 26'	Stadium: Białystok City Stadium

27 February 2018 25	Lechia Gdańsk	2–2	Bruk-Bet Termalica Nieciecza	Gdańsk
17:00 GMT	Marco Paixão 44' (pen.); Adam Chrzanowski 57'		Roman Gergel 26'; Joona Toivio 90+2'	Stadium: Stadion Energa Gdańsk

2 March 2018 26	Zagłębie Lubin	0–0	Lechia Gdańsk	Lubin
19:30 GMT				Stadium: Stadion Zagłębia Lubin

11 March 2018 27	Lechia Gdańsk	1–3	Legia Warsaw	Gdańsk
17:00 GMT	Simeon Slavchev 66'		Jarosław Niezgoda 24'; William Rémy 48'; Michał Kucharczyk 52'	Stadium: Stadion Energa Gdańsk

16 March 2018 28	Lech Poznań	3–0	Lechia Gdańsk	Poznań
19:30 GMT	Łukasz Trałka 17'; Christian Gytkjær 45+2'; Darko Jevtić 55'			Stadium: Stadion Miejski

31 March 2018 29	Korona Kielce	1–0	Lechia Gdańsk	Kielce
17:00 GMT	Goran Cvijanović 17'			Stadium: Kielce City Stadium

7 April 2018 30	Lechia Gdańsk	4–2	Arka Gdynia	Gdańsk
17:00 GMT	Flávio Paixão 14', 28' (pen.), 39'; Sławomir Peszko 25'		Luka Zarandia 67'; Enrique Esqueda 90+9'	Stadium: Stadion Energa Gdańsk

=== League table ===
Pos	Team	Pld	W	D	L	GF	GA	GD	Pts	Qualification
12	Pogoń Szczecin	30	8	7	15	34	48	−14	31 (Note: Head-to-head record: Śląsk 3–0 Pogoń, Pogoń 3–2 Śląsk.)	Qualification for the Relegation round
13	Piast Gliwice	30	6	12	12	28	38	−10	30 (Note: Head-to-head record: Piast 1–2 Lechia, Lechia 0–2 Piast.)	Qualification for the Relegation round
14	Lechia Gdańsk (Note: Lechia Gdańsk were punished with a deduction of one point for failing with licensing requirements.)	30	7	10	13	39	51	−12	30	Qualification for the Relegation round
15	Bruk-Bet Termalica Nieciecza	30	7	8	15	32	52	−20	29	Qualification for the Relegation round
16	Sandecja Nowy Sącz	30	4	13	13	27	46	−19	25	Qualification for the Relegation round

Source: Ekstraklasa, 90minut
Rules for classification: 1) Points; 2) Head-to-head points; 3) Head-to-head goal difference; 4) Head-to-head goals scored; 5) Head-to-head away goals scored (only if two teams); 6) Goal difference; 7) Goals scored; 8) Fairplay ranking; 9) Draw. (Note: Head-to-head record is used only after all the matches between the teams in question have been played.)

== Relegation Group ==
13 April 2018 31	Arka Gdynia	1–2	Lechia Gdańsk	Gdynia
17:00 GMT	Mateusz Szwoch 9' (pen.)		Steven Vitória 22'; Flávio Paixão 43'	Stadium: Stadion GOSiR

23 April 2018 32	Lechia Gdańsk	0–0	Cracovia	Gdańsk
17:00 GMT				Stadium: Stadion Energa Gdańsk

30 April 2018 33	Śląsk Wrocław	3–1	Lechia Gdańsk	Wrocław
17:00 GMT	Marcin Robak 26' (pen.); Jakub Kosecki 30', 45+1'		Sławomir Peszko 37'	Stadium: Stadion Miejski

4 May 2018 34	Lechia Gdańsk	0–1	Bruk-Bet Termalica Nieciecza	Gdańsk
19:30 GMT			Vladislavs Gutkovskis 74'	Stadium: Stadion Energa Gdańsk

8 May 2018 35	Piast Gliwice	0–2	Lechia Gdańsk	Piast
17:00 GMT			Michał Nalepa 45'; João Pedro Abreu de Oliveira 78'	Stadium: Stadion Piast

12 May 2018 36	Pogoń Szczecin	1–1	Lechia Gdańsk	Szczecin
14:30 GMT	Adam Frączczak 29'		Patryk Lipski 21'	Stadium: Stadion Florian Krygier

19 May 2018 37	Lechia Gdańsk	1–1	Sandecja Nowy Sącz	Gdańsk
17:00 GMT	Flávio Paixão 56'		Wojciech Trochim 29'	Stadium: Stadion Energa Gdańsk

=== League table ===
Pos	Team	Pld	W	D	L	GF	GA	GD	Pts	Qualification
11	Pogoń Szczecin	37	12	9	16	46	54	−8	45	
12	Arka Gdynia	37	11	10	16	46	48	−2	43	
13	Lechia Gdańsk	37	9	13	15	46	58	−12	39	
14	Piast Gliwice	37	8	13	16	40	48	−8	37	
15	Bruk-Bet Termalica Nieciecza (R)	37	9	9	19	39	66	−27	36	Relegation to I liga

Source: Ekstraklasa, 90minut
Rules for classification: 1) Points; 2) Points in regular season; 3) Head-to-head points in regular season; 4) Head-to-head goal difference in regular season; 5) Head-to-head goals scored in regular season; 5) Head-to-head away goals scored in regular season (if only two teams); 7) Goal difference; 8) Goals scored; 9) Fairplay ranking; 10) Play-off (only if needed to decide champion, teams for relegation or teams for UEFA competitions).
(R) Relegated

== Polish Cup ==
9 August 2017 Round of 32	Bytovia Bytów	1–0	Lechia Gdańsk	Bytów
18:00 GMT	Sebastian Kamiński 60'			Stadium: MOSiR Stadium Bytów

== Stats ==
			League		Cup		Total	
No.	Pos.	Player	Apps	Goals	Apps	Goals	Apps	Goals
1	GK	Dušan Kuciak	36	–	1	–	37	–
2	DF	Mato Miloš	14	–	–	–	14	–
3	DF	Jakub Wawrzyniak	20	–	1	–	21	–
4	DF	Gerson	5	–	–	–	5	–
5	DF	Steven Vitória	14	1	1	–	15	–
6	MF	Simeon Slavchev	27	1	–	–	27	1
7	MF	Miloš Krasić	29	1	–	–	29	1
8	MF	Romário Baldé	10	1	–	–	10	1
9	MF	Patryk Lipski	21	1	–	–	21	1
10	MF	Sebastian Mila	1	–	–	–	1	–
11	FW	Grzegorz Kuświk	11	–	–	–	11	–
13	DF	Mateusz Lewandowski	10	–	1	–	11	–
16	MF	Ariel Borysiuk	12	–	–	–	12	–
17	MF	Lukáš Haraslín	11	–	–	–	11	–
19	FW	Marco Paixão	28	16	–	–	28	16
20	DF	Adam Chrzanowski	10	1	–	–	10	1
21	MF	Sławomir Peszko	25	4	1	–	26	4
22	DF	Filip Mladenović	14	–	–	–	14	–
23	DF	Grzegorz Wojtkowiak	13	–	1	–	14	–
25	DF	Michał Nalepa	16	1	1	–	17	–
26	DF	Błażej Augustyn	15	2	–	–	15	2
27	MF	Rafał Wolski	11	1	–	–	11	1
28	FW	Flávio Paixão	34	10	1	–	35	10
29	DF	Karol Fila	1	–	1	–	2	–
29	FW	Mateusz Żukowski	2	–	–	-	2	–
30	DF	João Nunes	30	–	1	–	31	–
31	MF	Florian Schikowski	4	–	1	–	5	–
32	MF	Mateusz Matras	7	1	1	–	8	1
33	GK	Oliver Zelenika	1	–	–	–	1	–
35	MF	Daniel Łukasik	32	–	1	–	33	–
41	DF	Paweł Stolarski	25	–	1	–	26	–
96	MF	João Oliveira	19	3	–	–	19	3

=== Goalscorers ===
Rank	Player	Goals
1	Marco Paixão	16
2	Flávio Paixão	10
3	Sławomir Peszko	4
4	João Oliveira	3
5	Błażej Augustyn	2
5	Own Goals	2
7	Miloš Krasić	1
7	Simeon Slavchev	1
7	Michał Nalepa	1
7	Patryk Lipski	1
7	Steven Vitória	1
7	Mateusz Matras	1
7	Adam Chrzanowski	1
7	Romário Baldé	1
7	Rafał Wolski	1
