= 2016–17 Lechia Gdańsk season =

Lechia Gdańsk
2016–17 season
- Manager: Dawid Banaczek (-Jan 13); Piotr Nowak (Jan 13-)
- Stadium: Stadion Energa Gdańsk
- Ekstraklasa: 4th
- Polish Cup: Round of 16
- Top goalscorer: League: Marco Paixão (18 goals); All: Marco Paixão (18 goals)
- Highest home attendance: 37,220 vs Legia Warsaw
- Lowest home attendance: 10,009 vs Termalica Nieciecza
Home colours	Away colours	Third colours

The 2016–17 Ekstraklasa season was Lechia's 73rd since their creation, and was their 9th continuous season in the top league of Polish football.

The season covers the period from 1 July 2016 to 30 June 2017.

== Players ==
=== First team squad ===
Note: Flags indicate national team as defined under FIFA eligibility rules; some limited exceptions apply. Players may hold more than one non-FIFA nationality.

No.	Pos.	Nation	Player
1	GK	SRB	Dušan Kuciak
2	DF	POL	Rafał Janicki
3	DF	POL	Jakub Wawrzyniak
4	DF	BRA	Gerson
4	MF	SRB	Aleksandar Kovačević
5	DF	CAN	Steven Vitória
6	MF	BUL	Simeon Slavchev
7	MF	SRB	Miloš Krasić
9	MF	POL	Patryk Lipski
10	MF	POL	Sebastian Mila
11	FW	POL	Grzegorz Kuświk
13	MF	POL	Bartłomiej Pawłowski
14	MF	POL	Piotr Wiśniewski
16	MF	POL	Ariel Borysiuk
17	MF	SVK	Lukáš Haraslín
19	FW	POR	Marco Paixão

No.	Pos.	Nation	Player
20	MF	POL	Michał Chrapek
21	MF	POL	Sławomir Peszko
22	DF	CRO	Mario Maloča
23	DF	POL	Grzegorz Wojtkowiak
24	GK	POL	Mateusz Bąk
27	MF	POL	Rafał Wolski
28	MF	POR	Flávio Paixão
29	MF	POL	Karol Fila
30	DF	POR	João Aniceto Grandela Nunes
32	GK	SRB	Vanja Milinković-Savić
33	GK	CRO	Oliver Zelenika
35	MF	POL	Daniel Łukasik
41	DF	POL	Paweł Stolarski
43	DF	SVN	Denis Perger
77	GK	POL	Damian Podleśny
99	FW	NED	Gino van Kessel

=== Transfers ===
==== Players In ====
No.	Pos.	Player	From	Type	Window	Fee	Date	Source
38	DF	Milen Gamakov	PFC Botev Plovdiv	Transfer	Summer	Free	1 July 2016	
27	MF	Rafał Wolski	ACF Fiorentina	Transfer	Summer	€500k	4 July 2016	
5	DF	Steven Vitória	S.L. Benfica	Transfer	Summer	Free	17 August 2016	
6	MF	Simeon Slavchev	Sporting CP	Loan	Summer	€50k	17 August 2016	
30	DF	João Nunes	S.L. Benfica	Transfer	Summer	Free	29 August 2016	
43	DF	Denis Perger	NK Drava Ptuj	Transfer	Summer	Free	14 September 2016	
16	MF	Ariel Borysiuk	Queens Park Rangers F.C.	Loan	Winter	Free	26 January 2017	
1	GK	Dušan Kuciak	Hull City A.F.C.	Transfer	Winter	Free	1 February 2017	
99	FW	Gino van Kessel	SK Slavia Prague	Loan	Winter	Free	4 February 2017	
33	GK	Oliver Zelenika	-	Transfer	Winter	Free	15 March 2017	
		10 players				€550k		

==== Players Out ====
No.	Pos.	Player	From	Type	Window	Fee	Date	Source
11	MF	Maciej Makuszewski	Lech Poznań	Loan	Summer	Free	1 July 2016	
9	FW	Michał Mak	Arminia Bielefeld	Loan	Summer	Free	31 August 2016	
18	FW	Adam Buksa	Zagłębie Lubin	Transfer	Summer	€50k	31 August 2016	
15	MF	Adam Dźwigała	Górnik Łęczna	Loan	Summer	Free	31 August 2016	
35	MF	Daniel Łukasik	SV Sandhausen	Loan	Summer	Free	31 August 2016	
35	DF	Gerson	Górnik Łęczna	Loan	Summer	Free	31 August 2016	
4	MF	Aleksandar Kovačević	Śląsk Wrocław	Loan	Winter	Free	22 January 2017	
11	FW	Martin Kobylanski	SC Preußen Münster	Loan	Winter	Free	30 January 2017	
77	GK	Damian Podleśny	Wigry Suwałki	Loan	Winter	Free	8 February 2017	
		9 players				€50k		

== Friendlies ==
=== Summer ===
26 June 2016	Lechia Gdańsk	2–1	APOEL FC	Gniewino
15:00 BST	Sebastian Mila 51', 70'		Tomás De Vincenti 43'	Stadium: Stadion Miejski

6 July 2016	Chojniczanka Chojnice	2–1	Lechia Gdańsk	Chojnice
15:00 BST	Damian Podleśny 71 (OG)'; Marcin Krzywicki 89'		Marco Paixão 32'	Stadium: Chojniczanka 1930 City Stadium

9 July 2016	Lechia Gdańsk	2–1	Bytovia Bytów	Gdańsk
15:00 BST	Miloš Krasić 8'; Rafał Wolski 28'		Mateusz Klichowicz 19'	Stadium: MOSiR Stadium

16 July 2016	Lechia Gdańsk	0–0	Stomil Olsztyn	Gdańsk
10:00 BST				Stadium: MOSiR Stadium

11 November 2016	Pomezania Malbork	1–16	Lechia Gdańsk	Malbork
10:00 BST	Sławomir Ziemak 88'		Marco Paixão 9', 24', 41'; Flávio Paixão 10', 35'; Alen Ožbolt 31', 78', 83'; Miloš Krasić 37'; Sebastian Mila 40', 85', 90'; Martin Kobylański 53', 86'; Piotr Wiśniewski 61', 89'	Stadium: Stadion Miejski

=== Winter ===
20 January 2017	FC Akhmat Grozny	3–4	Lechia Gdańsk	Belek
10:30 BST	Marco Paixão 21'; Sławomir Peszko 23'; Grzegorz Kuświk 48', 68' (pen.)		Oleg Ivanov 55', 90' (pen.); Rizwan Uciew 74'	Stadium: Stadium: IC Hotels Football Center – Pitch A

23 January 2017	Lechia Gdańsk	1–0	CS Pandurii Târgu Jiu	Belek
8:30 BST	Piotr Wiśniewski 81'			Stadium: Stadium: IC Hotels Football Center – Pitch A

1 February 2017	Lechia Gdańsk	3–2	Chojniczanka Chojnice	Gdańsk
16:00 BST	Flávio Paixão 16'; Rafał Wolski 38'; Piotr Wiśniewski 63'		Paweł Golański 79'; Marcin Biernat 88'	Stadium: MOSiR Stadium

4 February 2017	Lechia Gdańsk	2–0	Bytovia Bytów	Gdańsk
16:00 BST	Marco Paixão 10'; Piotr Wiśniewski 72'			Stadium: MOSiR Stadium

== Ekstraklasa ==
=== Regular season ===
==== Matches ====
15 July 2016 1	Wisła Płock	2–1	Lechia Gdańsk	Płock
16:00 BST	Przemysław Szymiński 23'; Dominik Furman 77' (pen.)		Marco Paixão 15'	Stadium: Kazimierz Górski Stadium; Attendance: 8,521

22 July 2016 2	Górnik Łęczna	1–2	Lechia Gdańsk	Lublin
17:00 BST	Vanja Milinković-Savić 53 (OG)'		Miloš Krasić 28'; Grzegorz Kuświk 57'	Stadium: Arena Lublin; Attendance: 3,573

30 July 2016 3	Lechia Gdańsk	3–1	Wisła Kraków	Gdańsk
16:00 BST	Flávio Paixão 30', 68'; Marco Paixão 89'		Rafał Boguski 57'	Stadium: Stadion Energa Gdańsk; Attendance: 15,740

6 August 2016 4	Śląsk Wrocław	0–0	Lechia Gdańsk	Wrocław
16:00 BST				Stadium: Stadion Miejski; Attendance: 13,166

12 August 2016 5	Lechia Gdańsk	3–2	Korona Kielce	Gdańsk
16:00 BST	Grzegorz Kuświk 19', 86'; Radek Dejmek 37 (OG)'		Mateusz Możdżeń 40'; Elhadji Diaw 70'	Stadium: Stadion Energa Gdańsk; Attendance: 15,386

21 August 2016 6	Jagiellonia Białystok	0–1	Lechia Gdańsk	Białystok
16:00 GMT			Aleksandar Kovačević 63'	Stadium: Białystok City Stadium; Attendance: 17,100

28 August 2016 7	Lechia Gdańsk	1–2	Termalica Nieciecza	Gdańsk
16:00 BST	Flávio Paixão 88'		Vladislavs Gutkovskis 33', 82'	Stadium: Stadion Energa Gdańsk; Attendance: 17,140

9 September 2016 8	Cracovia	0–1	Lechia Gdańsk	Kraków
17:00 GMT			Marco Paixão 18'	Stadium: Marshal Józef Piłsudski Stadium; Attendance: 8,413

18 September 2016 9	Lechia Gdańsk	2–1	Lech Poznań	Gdańsk
13:30 BST	Marco Paixão 38'; Maciej Wilusz 87 (OG)'		Marcin Robak 35'	Stadium: Stadion Energa Gdańsk; Attendance: 26,054

24 September 2016 10	Lechia Gdańsk	2–1	Ruch Chorzów	Gdańsk
16:00 BST	Sławomir Peszko 5'; Flávio Paixão 13'		Rafał Grodzicki 35' (pen.)	Stadium: Stadion Energa Gdańsk; Attendance: 15,433

1 October 2016 11	Legia Warsaw	3–0	Lechia Gdańsk	Warsaw
18:30 BST	Guilherme 49', 58'; Nemanja Nikolić 70'			Stadium: Polish Army Stadium; Attendance: 18,929

15 October 2016 12	Zagłębie Lubin	1–2	Lechia Gdańsk	Lubin
18:30 GMT	Rafał Janicki 5'; Grzegorz Kuświk 31'		Martin Nešpor 49'	Stadium: Stadion Zagłębia Lubin; Attendance: 8,317

23 October 2016 13	Lechia Gdańsk	3–2	Piast Gliwice	Gdańsk
13:30 BST	Sławomir Peszko 9'; Flávio Paixão 79' (pen.)		Uroš Korun 28'; Saša Živec 64'	Stadium: Stadion Energa Gdańsk; Attendance: 17,206

30 October 2016 14	Arka Gdynia	1–1	Lechia Gdańsk	Gdynia
16:00 BST	Adrian Błąd 65'		Marco Paixão 32'	Stadium: Stadion GOSiR; Attendance: 14,029

5 November 2016 15	Lechia Gdańsk	1–1	Pogoń Szczecin	Gdańsk
18:30 BST	Rafał Wolski 9'		Adam Frączczak 41' (pen.)	Stadium: Stadion Energa Gdańsk; Attendance: 14,461

19 November 2016 16	Lechia Gdańsk	2–1	Wisła Płock	Gdańsk
18:30 GMT	Grzegorz Kuświk 60', 81'		Giorgi Merebashvili 28'	Stadium: Stadion Energa Gdańsk; Attendance: 12,921

28 November 2016 17	Lechia Gdańsk	3–0	Górnik Łęczna	Gdańsk
16:00 GMT	Marco Paixão 25'; Rafał Wolski 69'; Lukáš Haraslín 86'			Stadium: Stadion Energa Gdańsk; Attendance: 11,075

3 December 2016 18	Wisła Kraków	3–0	Lechia Gdańsk	Kraków
19:30 GMT	Arkadiusz Głowacki 5'; Rafał Boguski 26'; Mateusz Zachara 88'			Stadium: Stadion Miejski; Attendance: 9,607

9 December 2016 19	Lechia Gdańsk	3–0	Śląsk Wrocław	Gdańsk
18:30 GMT	Flávio Paixão 30', 90'; Grzegorz Kuświk 58'			Stadium: Stadion Energa Gdańsk; Attendance: 13,574

17 December 2016 20	Korona Kielce	2–0	Lechia Gdańsk	Kielce
13:30 GMT	Jacek Kiełb 61', 90+1'			Stadium: Kielce City Stadium; Attendance: 4,354

12 February 2017 21	Lechia Gdańsk	3–0	Jagiellonia Białystok	Gdańsk
16:00 GMT	Marco Paixão 11', 70'; Flávio Paixão 84' (pen.)			Stadium: Stadion Energa Gdańsk; Attendance: 15,513

17 February 2017 22	Bruk-Bet Termalica Nieciecza	1–1	Lechia Gdańsk	Nieciecza
18:30 GMT	Vladislavs Gutkovskis 90+6' (pen.)		Sławomir Peszko 73'	Stadium: Stadion Termaliki Bruk-Bet; Attendance: 3,012

15 February 2017 23	Lechia Gdańsk	4–2	Cracovia	Gdańsk
16:00 GMT	Ariel Borysiuk 45'; Flávio Paixão 47' (pen.); Grzegorz Kuświk 58'; Grzegorz Wojtkowiak 84'		Krzysztof Piątek 15', 70'	Stadium: Stadion Energa Gdańsk; Attendance: 13,018

5 March 2017 24	Lech Poznań	1–0	Lechia Gdańsk	Poznań
16:00 GMT	Radosław Majewski 69'			Stadium: Stadion Miejski; Attendance: 31,281

11 March 2017 25	Ruch Chorzów	2–1	Lechia Gdańsk	Chorzów
16:00 GMT	Paweł Stolarski 51 (OG)'; Jarosław Niezgoda 67'		Marco Paixão 61'	Stadium: Stadion Miejski; Attendance: 7,002

19 March 2017 26	Lechia Gdańsk	1–2	Legia Warsaw	Gdańsk
16:00 GMT	Mario Maloča 48'		Michał Kucharczyk 58', 87'	Stadium: Stadion Energa Gdańsk; Attendance: 37,220

2 April 2017 27	Lechia Gdańsk	1–0	Zagłębie Lubin	Gdańsk
17:00 GMT	Marco Paixão 27'			Stadium: Stadion Energa Gdańsk; Attendance: 16,263

9 April 2017 28	Piast Gliwice	1–1	Lechia Gdańsk	Piast
13:30 GMT	Aleksandar Sedlar 10'		Mario Maloča 12'	Stadium: Stadion Piast; Attendance: 5,974

17 April 2017 29	Lechia Gdańsk	2–1	Arka Gdynia	Gdańsk
16:00 GMT	Marco Paixão 27'; Sławomir Peszko 62'		Dominik Hofbauer 70'	Stadium: Stadion Energa Gdańsk; Attendance: 28,145

22 April 2017 30	Pogoń Szczecin	3–1	Lechia Gdańsk	Szczecin
17:00 GMT	Adam Frączczak 11'; Dawid Kort 62', 69'		Miloš Krasić 18'	Stadium: Stadion Florian Krygier; Attendance: 6,961

==== League table ====
Pos	Team	Pld	W	D	L	GF	GA	GD	Pts	Qualification
2	Legia Warsaw	30	17	7	6	58	30	+28	58	Qualification for the championship round
3	Lech Poznań	30	16	7	7	50	22	+28	55	Qualification for the championship round
4	Lechia Gdańsk	30	16	5	9	46	37	+9	53	Qualification for the championship round
5	Wisła Kraków	30	13	5	12	45	46	−1	44	Qualification for the championship round
6	Pogoń Szczecin	30	10	12	8	47	40	+7	42 (Note: Head-to-head record: Pogoń 5–0 Nieciecza, Nieciecza 2–0 Pogoń.)	Qualification for the championship round

Source: Ekstraklasa, 90minut, Soccerway
Rules for classification: 1) Points; 2) Head-to-head points; 3) Head-to-head goal difference; 4) Head-to-head goals scored; 5) Head-to-head away goals scored (only if two teams); 6) Goal difference; 7) Goals scored; 8) Fairplay ranking; 9) Draw. (Note: Head-to-head record is used only after all the matches between the teams in question have been played).

=== Championship round ===
==== Matches ====
19 April 2017 31	Lechia Gdańsk	2–0	Bruk-Bet Termalica Nieciecza	Gdańsk
19:30 GMT	Lukáš Haraslín 3'; Marco Paixão 53'			Stadium: Stadion Energa Gdańsk; Attendance: 10,095

6 May 2017 32	Wisła Kraków	0–1	Lechia Gdańsk	Kraków
19:30 GMT			Lukáš Haraslín 58'	Stadium: Stadion Miejski; Attendance: 16,021

14 May 2017 33	Lechia Gdańsk	0–0	Korona Kielce	Gdańsk
14:30 GMT				Stadium: Stadion Energa Gdańsk; Attendance: 15,349

17 May 2017 34	Lechia Gdańsk	4–0	Jagiellonia Białystok	Gdańsk
17:00 GMT	Marco Paixão 17' (pen.), pen', 48'; Lukáš Haraslín 89'			Stadium: Stadion Energa Gdańsk; Attendance: 15,025

21 May 2017 35	Lech Poznań	0–0	Lechia Gdańsk	Poznań
14:30 GMT				Stadium: Stadion Miejski; Attendance: 20,139

28 May 2017 36	Lechia Gdańsk	4–0	Pogoń Szczecin	Gdańsk
17:00 GMT	Marco Paixão 20', 34', 70' (pen.); Piotr Wiśniewski 80'			Stadium: Stadion Energa Gdańsk; Attendance: 20,067

4 June 2017 37	Legia Warsaw	0–0	Lechia Gdańsk	Warsaw
17:00 GMT				Stadium: Polish Army Stadium; Attendance: 28,953

==== League table ====
Pos	Team	Pld	W	D	L	GF	GA	GD	Pts	Qualification
2	Jagiellonia Białystok	37	21	8	8	64	39	+25	42 (Note: Regular season record: Jagiellonia 59 pts, Lech 55 pts, Lechia 53 pts.)	Qualification for the Europa League first qualifying round
3	Lech Poznań	37	20	9	8	62	29	+33	42	Qualification for the Europa League first qualifying round
4	Lechia Gdańsk	37	20	8	9	57	37	+20	42	
5	Korona Kielce	37	14	5	18	47	65	−18	28	
6	Wisła Kraków	37	14	6	17	54	57	−3	26	

Source: Ekstraklasa, 90minut
Rules for classification: 1) Points; 2) Points in regular season; 3) Head-to-head points in regular season; 4) Head-to-head goal difference in regular season; 5) Head-to-head goals scored in regular season; 5) Head-to-head away goals scored in regular season (if only two teams); 7) Goal difference; 8) Goals scored; 9) Fairplay ranking; 10) Play-off (only if needed to decide champion, teams for relegation or teams for UEFA competitions).

== Polish Cup ==
24 August 2016 Round of 32	Piast Gliwice	0–0 (a.e.t.) (3–5 p)	Lechia Gdańsk	Piast
17:00 GMT				Stadium: Stadion Piast; Attendance: 3,506

21 September 2016 Round of 16	Puszcza Niepołomice	1–1 (a.e.t.) (4–2 p)	Lechia Gdańsk	Niepołomice
13:45GMT	Maciej Domański 80'		Flávio Paixão 66'	Stadium: Stadion Puszczy; Attendance: 1,501

== Stats ==
			League		Cup		Total	
No.	Pos.	Player	Apps	Goals	Apps	Goals	Apps	Goals
1	GK	Dušan Kuciak	17	-	-	-	17	-
2	DF	Rafał Janicki	28	1	2	-	30	1
3	DF	Jakub Wawrzyniak	35	-	2	-	37	-
4	MF	Aleksandar Kovačević	5	1	2	-	7	1
5	DF	Steven Vitória	8	-	1	-	9	-
6	MF	Simeon Slavchev	23	-	-	-	23	-
7	MF	Miloš Krasić	34	2	1	-	35	2
9	FW	Michał Mak	5	-	-	-	5	-
10	MF	Sebastian Mila	8	-	-	-	8	-
11	FW	Grzegorz Kuświk	33	8	-	-	33	8
13	MF	Bartłomiej Pawłowski	6	-	1	-	7	-
14	MF	Piotr Wiśniewski	4	1	2	-	6	1
16	MF	Ariel Borysiuk	14	1	-	-	14	1
17	MF	Lukáš Haraslín	26	3	1	-	27	3
19	FW	Marco Paixão	35	18	2	-	37	18
20	MF	Michał Chrapek	18	-	1	-	19	-
21	MF	Sławomir Peszko	29	3	-	-	29	3
22	DF	Mario Maloča	31	1	1	-	32	1
23	DF	Grzegorz Wojtkowiak	16	1	2	-	18	1
24	GK	Mateusz Bąk	1	-	-	-	1	-
27	MF	Rafał Wolski	34	2	2	-	36	2
28	FW	Flávio Paixão	33	10	2	1	35	11
30	DF	João Nunes	23	-	-	-	23	-
32	GK	Vanja Milinković-Savić	18	-	-	-	18	-
35	DF	Gerson	1	-	1	-	2	-
38	DF	Milen Gamakov	4	-	1	-	5	-
41	DF	Paweł Stolarski	24	-	2	-	26	-
77	GK	Damian Podleśny	2	-	2	-	4	-
99	FW	Gino van Kessel	3	-	-	-	3	-

=== Goalscorers ===
Rank	Player	Goals
1	Marco Paixão	18
2	Flávio Paixão	11
3	Grzegorz Kuświk	8
4	Sławomir Peszko	3
4	Lukáš Haraslín	3
6	Miloš Krasić	2
6	Rafał Wolski	2
6	Own Goals	2
9	Rafał Janicki	1
9	Mario Maloča	1
9	Grzegorz Wojtkowiak	1
9	Piotr Wiśniewski	1
9	Ariel Borysiuk	1
9	Aleksandar Kovačević	1
