= 2015–16 Lechia Gdańsk season =

Lechia Gdańsk
2015–16 season
- Manager: Jerzy Brzęczek (–Sep 1) Thomas von Heesen (Sep 1 – Dec 3); Dawid Banaczek (Dec 3 – Jan 13) Piotr Nowak (Jan 13–)
- Stadium: Stadion Energa Gdańsk
- Ekstraklasa: 5th
- Polish Cup: Round of 16
- Top goalscorer: League: Grzegorz Kuswik (11 goals); All: Grzegorz Kuswik (11 goals)
- Highest home attendance: 22,415 vs Legia Warsaw
- Lowest home attendance: 8,827 vs Śląsk Wrocław
Home colours	Away colours

The 2015–16 Ekstraklasa season was Lechia's 72nd since their creation, and was their 8th continuous season in the top league of Polish football. The season covers the period from 1 July 2015 to 30 June 2016. On 7 August 2015 the club celebrated its 70th anniversary.

== Players ==
=== First-team squad ===
Note: Flags indicate national team as defined under FIFA eligibility rules; some limited exceptions apply. Players may hold more than one non-FIFA nationality.

No.	Pos.	Nation	Player
1	GK	POL	Łukasz Budziłek
2	DF	POL	Rafał Janicki
3	DF	POL	Jakub Wawrzyniak
4	MF	SRB	Aleksandar Kovačević
6	MF	POL	Sebastian Mila
7	MF	SRB	Miloš Krasić
8	MF	POL	Daniel Łukasik
9	FW	POL	Michał Mak
10	MF	BRA	Bruno Nazário
11	FW	GER	Martin Kobylanski
11	MF	POL	Maciej Makuszewski
13	MF	POL	Bartłomiej Pawłowski
14	MF	POL	Piotr Wiśniewski
15	DF	POL	Adam Dźwigała
16	MF	POL	Ariel Borysiuk
17	MF	SVK	Lukáš Haraslín
18	FW	POL	Adam Buksa

No.	Pos.	Nation	Player
19	FW	POR	Marco Paixão
20	MF	POL	Michał Chrapek
21	MF	POL	Sławomir Peszko
21	MF	BIH	Stojan Vranješ
22	DF	CRO	Mario Maloča
23	DF	POL	Grzegorz Wojtkowiak
24	GK	POL	Mateusz Bąk
25	DF	POL	Adam Chrzanowski
28	MF	POR	Flávio Paixão
29	DF	SRB	Neven Marković
30	FW	POL	Grzegorz Kuświk
32	GK	SRB	Vanja Milinković-Savić
33	DF	SRB	Nikola Leković
35	DF	BRA	Gerson
41	DF	POL	Paweł Stolarski
44	FW	POL	Michał Żebrakowski
50	GK	CRO	Marko Marić

=== Transfers ===
==== Players In ====
No.	Pos.	Player	From	Type	Window	Fee	Date	Source
16	MF	Ariel Borysiuk	1. FC Kaiserslautern	Transfer	Summer	€500k	1 July 2015	
9	FW	Michał Mak	GKS Bełchatów	Transfer	Summer	€150k	1 July 2015	
50	GK	Marko Marić	1899 Hoffenheim	Loan	Summer	Free	2 July 2015	
22	DF	Mario Maloča	Hajduk Split	Transfer	Summer	€150k	3 July 2015	
17	MF	Lukáš Haraslín	Parma	Transfer	Summer	Free	7 July 2015	
30	FW	Grzegorz Kuświk	Ruch Chorzów	Transfer	Summer	Free	17 July 2015	
7	MF	Miloš Krasić	Fenerbahçe	Transfer	Summer	Free	30 August 2015	
4	MF	Aleksandar Kovačević	Red Star Belgrade	Transfer	Summer	Free	31 August 2015	
20	MF	Michał Chrapek	Calcio Catania	Transfer	Summer	Free	31 August 2015	
21	MF	Sławomir Peszko	1. FC Köln	Transfer	Summer	Free	31 August 2015	
32	GK	Vanja Milinković-Savić	Manchester United	Transfer	Winter	Free	1 January 2016	
19	FW	Marco Paixão	Sparta Prague	Transfer	Winter	Free	9 January 2016	
28	FW	Flávio Paixão	Śląsk Wrocław	Transfer	Winter	€100k	8 February 2016	
11	FW	Martin Kobylański	Werder Bremen	Transfer	Winter	Free	8 February 2016	
		10 players				€900k		

==== Players Out ====
No.	Pos.	Player	From	Type	Window	Fee	Date	Source
17	MF	Marcin Pietrowski	Piast Gliwice	Transfer	Summer	Free	1 July 2015	
9	FW	Piotr Grzelczak	Jagiellonia Białystok	Transfer	Summer	Free	1 July 2015	
32	MF	Mateusz Możdżeń	Podbeskidzie	Transfer	Summer	Free	1 July 2015	
12	GK	Dariusz Trela	Korona Kielce	Loan	Summer	Free	1 July 2015	
21	MF	Stojan Vranješ	Legia Warsaw	Transfer	Summer	€300k	29 August 2015	
19	MF	Bartłomiej Pawłowski	Korona Kielce	Loan	Summer	Free	31 August 2015	
33	DF	Nikola Leković	FK Partizan	Transfer	Summer	Free	31 August 2015	
15	DF	Adam Dźwigała	Górnik Zabrze	Loan	Summer	Free	31 August 2015	
16	MF	Ariel Borysiuk	Legia Warsaw	Transfer	Winter	€800k	11 January 2016	
11	MF	Maciej Makuszewski	Vitória F.C.	Loan	Winter	Free	28 January 2016	
6	DF	Tiago Valente	Vitória F.C.	Transfer	Winter	Free	2 February 2016	
		10 players				€1.1m		

== Friendlies ==
=== Summer ===
17 June 2015	Lechia Gdańsk	4–1	APOEL FC	Gdańsk
16:00 BST	Jakub Wawrzyniak 26' (pen.); Adam Buksa 46'; Lukasz Kopka 86'; Hieronim Gierszewski 87'		Mateusz Piątkowski 64'	Stadium: MOSiR Stadium

4 July 2015 LOTTO Lubelskie Cup Semi-Final	Lechia Gdańsk	0–0 (15–14 p)	FC Shakhtar Donetsk	Lublin
15:15 BST				Stadium: Arena Lublin

5 July 2015 LOTTO Lubelskie Cup Final	Lechia Gdańsk	1–1 (2–4 p)	Hannover 96	Lublin
16:30 BST	Stojan Vranješ 67'		Kenan Karaman 89'	Stadium: Arena Lublin

12 July 2015	Lechia Gdańsk	1–1	VfL Wolfsburg	Gdańsk
12:30 BST	Mario Maloča 80'		Aaron Hunt 33'	Stadium: Stadion Energa Gdańsk

22 July 2015	Lechia Gdańsk	0–1	FC Schalke 04	Gdańsk
17:30 BST			Leroy Sané 44'	Stadium: Stadion Energa Gdańsk

29 July 2015	Lechia Gdańsk	1–2	Juventus FC	Gdańsk
16:00 BST	Adam Buksa 83'		Paul Pogba 4'; Mario Mandžukić 90'	Stadium: Stadion Energa Gdańsk

5 September 2015	Resovia Rzeszów	1–2	Lechia Gdańsk	Rzeszów
11:00 BST	Radosław Adamski 25'		Grzegorz Kuświk 22'; Michał Żebrakowski 74'	Stadium: Stadion CWKS Resovia

=== Winter ===
17 January 2016	Lechia Gdańsk	0–1	FC St. Pauli	Belek
15:00 BST			Jeremy Dudziak 30'	Stadium: Stadium: IC Hotels Football Center – Pitch A

6 February 2016	Lechia Gdańsk	2–0	Zawisza Bydgoszcz	Gdańsk
15:00 BST	Lukáš Haraslín 4'; Daniel Łukasik 8'			Stadium: MOSiR Stadium

== Regular season ==
=== Fixtures for the 2015–16 Ekstraklasa season ===
17 July 2015 1	Lechia Gdańsk	0–1	Cracovia	Gdańsk
19:30 BST			Piotr Polczak 26'	Stadium: Stadion Energa Gdańsk; Attendance: 13,143

25 July 2015 2	Lech Poznań	2–1	Lechia Gdańsk	Poznań
19:30 BST	Kasper Hämäläinen 19'; Marcin Robak 90+1'		Rafał Janicki 75'	Stadium: Stadion Miejski; Attendance: 13,821

31 July 2015 3	Lechia Gdańsk	1–1	Pogoń Szczecin	Gdańsk
19:30 BST	Adam Buksa 14'		Łukasz Zwoliński 23'	Stadium: Stadion Energa Gdańsk; Attendance: 11,173

9 August 2015 4	Śląsk Wrocław	0–0	Lechia Gdańsk	Wrocław
14:30 BST				Stadium: Stadion Miejski; Attendance: 7,939

16 August 2015 5	Wisła Kraków	3–3	Lechia Gdańsk	Kraków
16:00 BST	Wilde-Donald Guerrier 6'; Maciej Jankowski 11', 58'		Daniel Łukasik 18'; Lukáš Haraslín 51'; Mario Maloča 87'	Stadium: Stadion Miejski; Attendance: 11,115

21 August 2015 6	Lechia Gdańsk	3–1	Górnik Łęczna	Gdańsk
19:30 GMT	Lukáš Haraslín 45+2', 55'; Stojan Vranješ 90+4' (pen.)		Grzegorz Piesio 45+4'	Stadium: Stadion Energa Gdańsk; Attendance: 12,193

28 August 2015 7	Podbeskidzie Bielsko-Biała	1–1	Lechia Gdańsk	Bielsko-Biała
17:00 BST	Frank Adu Kwame 17'		Ariel Borysiuk 21'	Stadium: Stadion Miejski; Attendance: 5,035

11 September 2015 8	Lechia Gdańsk	0–0	Korona Kielce	Gdańsk
17:00 GMT				Stadium: Stadion Energa Gdańsk; Attendance: 11,170

19 September 2015 9	Piast Gliwice	2–1	Lechia Gdańsk	Piast
19:30 BST	Martin Nešpor 44'; Hebert Silva Santos 71'		Ariel Borysiuk 4'	Stadium: Stadion Piast; Attendance: 5,877

27 September 2015 10	Lechia Gdańsk	3–1	Zagłębie Lubin	Gdańsk
14:30 BST	Grzegorz Kuświk 52', 61' (pen.); Michał Mak 79'		Michal Papadopulos 34'	Stadium: Stadion Energa Gdańsk; Attendance: 10,796

2 October 2015 11	Jagiellonia Białystok	0–3	Lechia Gdańsk	Białystok
18:30 BST			Michał Mak 65'; Maciej Makuszewski 76'; Grzegorz Kuświk 90+1'	Stadium: Białystok City Stadium; Attendance: 11,195

16 October 2015 12	Lechia Gdańsk	1–1	Górnik Zabrze	Gdańsk
17:00 GMT	Maciej Makuszewski 38'		Maciej Korzym 18'	Stadium: Stadion Energa Gdańsk; Attendance: 10,987

25 October 2015 13	Bruk-Bet Termalica Nieciecza	0–1	Lechia Gdańsk	Nieciecza
14:30 BST			Grzegorz Kuświk 90' (pen.)	Stadium: Stadion Termaliki Bruk-Bet; Attendance: 2,695

31 October 2015 14	Lechia Gdańsk	1–3	Legia Warsaw	Gdańsk
17:00 BST	Aleksandar Kovačević 54'		Guilherme 31'; Nemanja Nikolić 50'; Tomasz Jodłowiec 58'	Stadium: Stadion Energa Gdańsk; Attendance: 19,285

7 November 2015 15	Ruch Chorzów	3–2	Lechia Gdańsk	Chorzów
17:00 BST	Mariusz Stępiński 10'; Marek Zieńczuk 23'; Michał Koj 26'		Michał Mak 65', 68'	Stadium: Stadion Miejski; Attendance: 6,829

23 November 2015 16	Cracovia	3–0	Lechia Gdańsk	Kraków
17:00 GMT	Deniss Rakels 59'; Mateusz Cetnarski 70'; Erik Jendrišek 83'			Stadium: Marshal Józef Piłsudski Stadium; Attendance: 6,367

29 November 2015 17	Lechia Gdańsk	0–1	Lech Poznań	Gdańsk
14:30 GMT			Kasper Hämäläinen 63'	Stadium: Stadion Energa Gdańsk; Attendance: 14,260

2 December 2015 18	Pogoń Szczecin	1–0	Lechia Gdańsk	Szczecin
17:00 GMT	Rafał Murawski 90+1'			Stadium: Stadion Florian Krygier; Attendance: 3,214

6 December 2015 19	Lechia Gdańsk	1–0	Śląsk Wrocław	Gdańsk
14:30 GMT	Gerson 33'			Stadium: Stadion Energa Gdańsk; Attendance: 8,827

12 December 2015 20	Lechia Gdańsk	2–0	Wisła Kraków	Gdańsk
13:30 GMT	Michał Mak 36'; Maciej Makuszewski 55'			Stadium: Stadion Energa Gdańsk; Attendance: 9,527

19 December 2015 21	Górnik Łęczna	3–1	Lechia Gdańsk	Łęczna
17:00 GMT	Grzegorz Piesio 2', 40'; Bartosz Śpiączka 75'		Rafał Janicki 16'	Stadium: Stadion Górnika Łęczna; Attendance: 3,734

13 February 2016 22	Lechia Gdańsk	5–0	Podbeskidzie Bielsko-Biała	Gdańsk
17:00 GMT	Sebastian Mila 48' (pen.); Mario Maloča 54'; Grzegorz Kuświk 58'; Miloš Krasić 59'; Sławomir Peszko 86'			Stadium: Stadion Energa Gdańsk; Attendance: 9,587

20 February 2016 23	Korona Kielce	4–2	Lechia Gdańsk	Kielce
14:30 GMT	Airam Cabrera 8' (pen.), 50' (pen.), 59'; Mario Maloča 72' (o.g.)		Grzegorz Wojtkowiak 34'; Grzegorz Kuświk 73'	Stadium: Kielce City Stadium; Attendance: 5,103

27 February 2016 24	Lechia Gdańsk	3–1	Piast Gliwice	Gdańsk
17:00 GMT	Grzegorz Kuświk 31'; Michał Mak 38'; Paweł Stolarski 90+5'		Mateusz Mak 59'	Stadium: Stadion Energa Gdańsk; Attendance: 11,106

1 March 2016 25	Zagłębie Lubin	1–0	Lechia Gdańsk	Lubin
19:30 GMT	Filip Starzyński 49'			Stadium: Stadion Zagłębia Lubin; Attendance: 3,049

6 March 2016 26	Lechia Gdańsk	5–1	Jagiellonia Białystok	Gdańsk
14:30 GMT	Flávio Paixão 7', 44', 90+3'; Grzegorz Kuświk 29'; Miloš Krasić 66' (pen.)		Fedor Černych 53'	Stadium: Stadion Energa Gdańsk; Attendance: 11,411

13 March 2016 27	Górnik Zabrze	1–1	Lechia Gdańsk	Zabrze
17:00 GMT	Bartosz Kopacz 88'		Aleksandar Kovačević 55'	Stadium: Ernest Pohl Stadium; Attendance: 12,586

20 March 2016 28	Lechia Gdańsk	1–1	Termalica Nieciecza	Gdańsk
13:30 GMT	Michał Chrapek 25'		Bartłomiej Smuczyński 77'	Stadium: Stadion Energa Gdańsk; Attendance: 12,223

2 April 2016 29	Legia Warsaw	1–1	Lechia Gdańsk	Warsaw
19:30 GMT	Ondrej Duda 21'		Grzegorz Kuświk 47'	Stadium: Polish Army Stadium; Attendance: 28,131

9 April 2016 30	Lechia Gdańsk	2–0	Ruch Chorzów	Gdańsk
17:00 GMT	Sebastian Mila 8' (pen.); Flávio Paixão 34'			Stadium: Stadion Energa Gdańsk; Attendance: 19,368

=== League table ===
Pos	Team	Pld	W	D	L	GF	GA	GD	Pts	Qualification
5	Cracovia	30	12	9	9	57	42	+15	45 (Note: Head-to-head record: Zagłębie - Cracovia 4–2, Cracovia - Zagłębie 1–2.)	Qualification for the championship round
6	Lech Poznań	30	13	4	13	37	38	−1	43	Qualification for the championship round
7	Lechia Gdańsk (Note: Lechia Gdańsk were punished with a deduction of one point for failing with licensing requirements. On 8 April 2016 the punishment was suspended by Polish Court of Arbitration for Sport. On April 11 an appeal against the original decision was withdrawn by the club.)	30	10	9	11	45	37	+8	38 (Note: Head-to-head record: Lechia 7 points, Ruch 5 points, Podbeskidzie 3 points.)	Qualification for the championship round
8	Ruch Chorzów (Note: Ruch Chorzów were punished with a deduction of one point for failing with licensing requirements.)	30	11	6	13	37	46	−9	38	Qualification for the championship round
9	Podbeskidzie Bielsko-Biała	30	9	11	10	37	46	−9	38	Qualification for the relegation round

Source: Ekstraklasa, Soccerway
Rules for classification: 1) Points; 2) Head-to-head points; 3) Head-to-head goal difference; 4) Head-to-head goals scored; 5) Head-to-head away goals scored (only if two teams); 6) Goal difference; 7) Goals scored; 8) Fairplay ranking; 9) Draw. (Note: Head-to-head record is used only after all the matches between the teams in question have been played).

== Championship Group ==
16 April 2016 31	Zagłębie Lubin	1–2	Lechia Gdańsk	Lubin
17:00 GMT	Łukasz Janoszka 59'		Grzegorz Kuświk 29'; Flávio Paixão 69'	Stadium: Stadion Zagłębia Lubin; Attendance: 6,469

19 April 2016 32	Lechia Gdańsk	2–0	Pogoń Szczecin	Gdańsk
19:30 GMT	Miloš Krasić 9'; Grzegorz Wojtkowiak 66'			Stadium: Stadion Energa Gdańsk; Attendance: 10,181

24 April 2016 33	Piast Gliwice	3–0	Lechia Gdańsk	Piast
17:00 GMT	Uroš Korun 32'; Mateusz Mak 81' (pen.); Josip Barišić 90+1'			Stadium: Stadion Piast; Attendance: 6,407

28 April 2016 34	Lech Poznań	0–0	Lechia Gdańsk	Poznań
17:00 GMT				Stadium: Stadion Miejski; Attendance: 10,770

7 May 2016 35	Lechia Gdańsk	2–1	Ruch Chorzów	Gdańsk
19:30 GMT	Grzegorz Kuświk 25'; Flávio Paixão 35'		Tomasz Podgórski 56'	Stadium: Stadion Energa Gdańsk; Attendance: 13,005

11 May 2016 36	Lechia Gdańsk	2–0	Legia Warsaw	Gdańsk
19:30 GMT	Sławomir Peszko 20'; Miloš Krasić 50'			Stadium: Stadion Energa Gdańsk; Attendance: 22,415

15 May 2016 37	Cracovia	2–0	Lechia Gdańsk	Kraków
17:00 GMT	Mateusz Cetnarski 9'; Rafał Janicki 65' (o.g.)			Stadium: Marshal Józef Piłsudski Stadium; Attendance: 12,359

=== League table ===
Pos	Team	Pld	W	D	L	GF	GA	GD	Pts	Qualification
1	Legia Warsaw (C)	37	21	10	6	70	32	+38	43	Qualification for the Champions League second qualifying round (Note: Legia Warsaw qualified for the Europa League second qualifying round by winning the 2015–16 Polish Cup. However, since they already qualified for European competition based on their league position, the spot awarded to the cup winners was passed down the league.)
2	Piast Gliwice	37	20	9	8	60	45	+15	40	Qualification for the Europa League second qualifying round
3	Zagłębie Lubin	37	17	9	11	55	42	+13	38	Qualification for the Europa League first qualifying round
4	Cracovia	37	16	10	11	66	50	+16	36	Qualification for the Europa League first qualifying round
5	Lechia Gdańsk (Note: Lechia Gdańsk were punished with a deduction of one point during regular season for failing with licensing requirements. On 8 April 2016 the punishment was suspended by Polish Court of Arbitration for Sport.On 11 April 2016 an appeal against the original decision was withdrawn by the club.)	37	14	10	13	53	44	+9	32	
6	Pogoń Szczecin	37	12	17	8	43	43	0	30	
7	Lech Poznań	37	14	6	17	42	47	−5	27	
8	Ruch Chorzów (Note: Ruch Chorzów were punished with a deduction of one point during regular season for failing with licensing requirements.)	37	11	8	18	40	60	−20	21	

Source: Ekstraklasa, Soccerway
Rules for classification: 1) Points; 2) Points in regular season; 3) Head-to-head points in regular season; 4) Head-to-head goal difference in regular season; 5) Head-to-head goals scored in regular season; 5) Head-to-head away goals scored in regular season (if only two teams); 7) Goal difference; 8) Goals scored; 9) Fairplay ranking; 10) Play-off (only if needed to decide champion, teams for relegation or teams for UEFA competitions).
(C) Champions

== Polish Cup ==
12 August 2015 Round of 32	Puszcza Niepołomice	1–5	Lechia Gdańsk	Niepołomice
16:00 GMT	Adrian Gębalski 38' (pen.)		Piotr Wiśniewski 20', 36'; Maciej Makuszewski 44'; Bartłomiej Pawłowski 49', 74'	Stadium: Stadion Puszczy; Attendance: 1,716

24 September 2015 Round of 16	Legia Warsaw	4–1	Lechia Gdańsk	Warsaw
19:30 GMT	Aleksandar Prijović 25', 86'; Nemanja Nikolić 62'; Igor Lewczuk 75'		Michał Mak 76'	Stadium: Polish Army Stadium; Attendance: 17,000

== Stats ==
			League		Cup		Total	
No.	Pos.	Player	Apps	Goals	Apps	Goals	Apps	Goals
1	GK	Łukasz Budziłek	2	-	1	-	3	-
2	DF	Rafał Janicki	35	2	2	-	37	2
3	DF	Jakub Wawrzyniak	32	-	1	-	33	-
4	MF	Aleksandar Kovačević	25	2	-	-	25	2
6	MF	Sebastian Mila	29	2	1	-	30	2
7	MF	Miloš Krasić	23	4	1	-	24	4
8	MF	Daniel Łukasik	20	1	2	-	22	1
9	FW	Michał Mak	23	6	2	1	25	7
10	MF	Bruno Nazário	9	-	1	-	10	-
11	FW	Martin Kobylanski	3	-	-	-	3	-
11	MF	Maciej Makuszewski	20	3	2	1	22	4
14	MF	Piotr Wiśniewski	9	-	1	2	10	2
15	DF	Adam Dźwigała	-	-	1	-	1	-
16	MF	Ariel Borysiuk	20	2	2	-	22	2
17	MF	Lukáš Haraslín	20	3	1	-	21	3
18	FW	Adam Buksa	8	1	1	-	9	1
19	FW	Marco Paixão	3	-	-	-	3	-
20	MF	Michał Chrapek	14	1	-	-	14	1
21	MF	Sławomir Peszko	27	2	1	-	28	2
21	MF	Stojan Vranješ	5	1	-	-	5	1
22	DF	Mario Maloča	28	2	-	-	28	2
23	DF	Grzegorz Wojtkowiak	28	2	2	-	30	2
24	DF	Adam Chrzanowski	1	-	-	-	1	-
28	FW	Flávio Paixão	16	6	-	-	16	6
29	DF	Neven Marković	5	-	1	-	6	-
30	FW	Grzegorz Kuświk	33	11	-	-	33	11
32	GK	Vanja Milinković-Savić	11	-	-	-	11	-
33	DF	Nikola Leković	2	-	-	-	2	-
35	DF	Gerson	15	1	1	-	16	1
41	DF	Paweł Stolarski	21	1	1	-	22	1
44	FW	Michał Żebrakowski	3	-	-	-	3	-
50	GK	Marko Marić	24	-	1	-	25	-

=== Goalscorers ===
Rank	Player	Goals
1	Grzegorz Kuświk	11
2	Michał Mak	7
3	Flávio Paixão	6
4	Miloš Krasić	4
4	Maciej Makuszewski	4
5	Lukáš Haraslín	3
6	Rafał Janicki	2
6	Mario Maloča	2
6	Grzegorz Wojtkowiak	2
6	Sebastian Mila	2
6	Aleksandar Kovačević	2
6	Sławomir Peszko	2
6	Ariel Borysiuk	2
6	Piotr Wiśniewski	2
6	Bartłomiej Pawłowski	2
15	Paweł Stolarski	1
15	Daniel Łukasik	1
15	Adam Buksa	1
15	Gerson	1
15	Michał Chrapek	1
15	Stojan Vranješ	1
