= Flávio Paixão =

Portuguese footballer (born 1984)

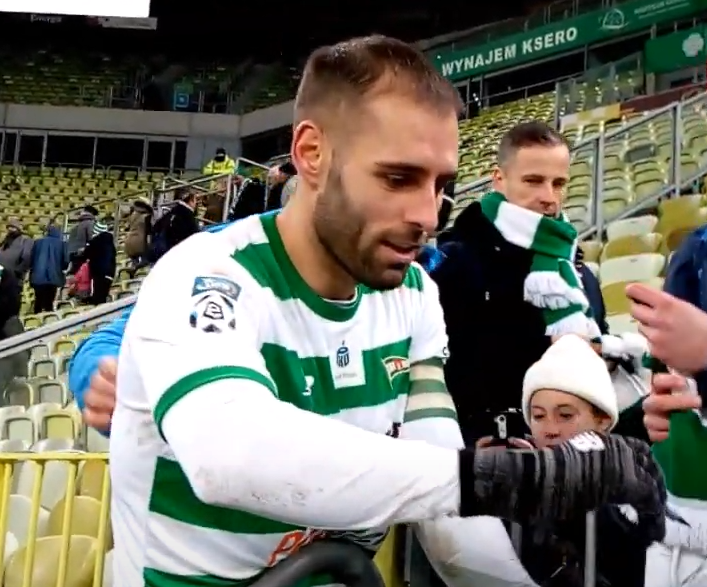
- Paixão with Lechia Gdańsk in 2018

Personal information
- Full name: Flávio Emanuel Lopes Paixão
- Date of birth: 19 September 1984 (age 42)
- Place of birth: Sesimbra, Portugal
- Height: 1.84 m (6 ft 0 in)
- Position: Forward

Youth career
- 1994–1995: Alfarim
- 1995–2003: Sesimbra

Senior career*
Years	Team	Apps	(Gls)
2003–2005	Sesimbra		
2005–2006	Porto B	11	(1)
2006–2007	Villanovense	34	(10)
2007	Jaén	8	(0)
2008–2009	Benidorm	53	(11)
2009–2011	Hamilton Academical	55	(9)
2011–2013	Tractor	61	(20)
2014–2016	Śląsk Wrocław	71	(24)
2016–2023	Lechia Gdańsk	239	(84)
Total		532	(159)
- * Club domestic league appearances and goals

Flávio Emanuel Lopes Paixão (born 19 September 1984) is a Portuguese former professional footballer who played as a forward.

He never played professionally in his own country, and earned his greatest successes in Poland, scoring 108 Ekstraklasa goals for Śląsk Wrocław and Lechia Gdańsk, all-time best for a foreigner until April 2026. Additionally, he had spells in Spain, Scotland and Iran.

== Club career ==
=== Early years ===
Born in Sesimbra, Setúbal District, Paixão spent his early career in Portugal and Spain, playing with lowly teams in both countries – his hometown's G.D. Sesimbra, FC Porto B, CF Villanovense, Real Jaén and Benidorm CF.

In the 2006–07 season, he scored ten goals for Villanovense but suffered relegation from Segunda División B, the only level in which he competed in Spain.

=== Hamilton Academical ===
Paixão's first taste of professional football came on 6 August 2009 as he signed for Scottish Premier League club Hamilton Academical alongside twin brother Marco. He made his league debut nine days later, playing the full 90 minutes of a 3–0 loss away to Kilmarnock.

Paixão was released from his contract with immediate effect on 14 April 2011, alongside his sibling. He appeared in 60 official matches for the Accies, scoring ten goals; his first was in a 2–1 loss at Heart of Midlothian on 26 September 2009.

=== Tractor ===
On 2 August 2011, Paixão signed a one-year contract with Tractor S.C. in Iran, for an undisclosed fee. In his first season he netted a club-best ten goals in the Pro League, being voted by Goal.com as best player on the team.

=== Śląsk Wrocław ===
Paixão then returned to Europe, joining Polish Ekstraklasa's Śląsk Wrocław at the tail end of the 2013–14 campaign. In his first full season he scored 18 goals, bettered only by Kamil Wilczek from Piast Gliwice; this included a hat-trick on 25 October 2014 in a 4–1 win at Lechia Gdańsk.

=== Lechia Gdańsk ===
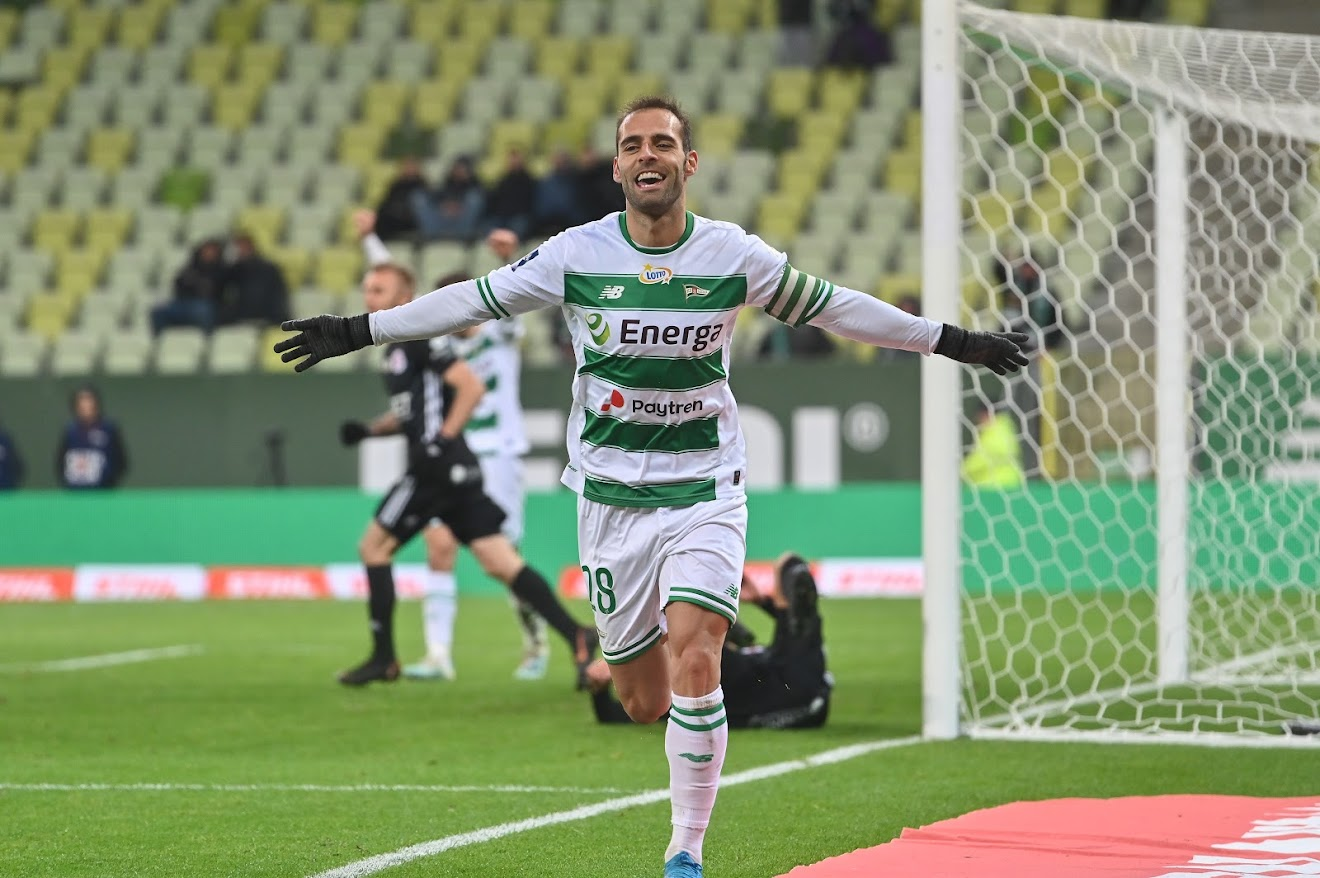
Paixão celebrating a goal for Lechia Gdańsk in December 2019

On 8 February 2016, Paixão moved to Lechia Gdańsk for a fee of £100,000 with two years left on his contract, with Śląsk unhappy with the player's behaviour and accusing him of being disloyal– he reunited with his sibling, who arrived earlier from AC Sparta Prague. He scored a combined 26 goals in his first two and a half seasons, adding ten in all competitions in 2017–18, five of which were against Lechia's main rivals Arka Gdynia in the Tricity Derby.

The 2018–19 campaign proved to be Paixão's best in terms of goalscoring with 15 goals in total, with him being his team's top scorer and the fifth highest in the league as they finished in third position. He broke a long-standing Lechia record of scoring the most goals for the team in the Polish top division, surpassing previous holder Bogdan Adamczyk on 25 November 2018 after finding the net against Jagiellonia Białystok. He also won the Polish Cup, assisting the only goal of the final on 2 May against Jagiellonia for Artur Sobiech in added time, having earlier had a goal ruled out by the video assistant referee for offside.

At the start of 2019–20, Paixão started in the Polish Super Cup, helping his side win the match 3–1 after defeating Piast. He scored in both legs of the second qualifying round in the UEFA Europa League against Brøndby IF (5–3 aggregate loss), and as a result became the first club player to achieve the feat more than once in European competition.

On 23 April 2022, Paixão scored his 99th and 100th goals in the Polish top tier in a 2–0 win against Warta Poznań, becoming the 34th player in the league's history to achieve this feat and the first foreigner to do so. His second was also Lechia's 1000th in the history of the competition.

On 4 May 2023, it was announced Paixão would leave the club at the end of the season which saw Lechia compete in the qualifying rounds of the UEFA Europa Conference League but also struggle domestically, resulting in relegation to I liga. He made his final appearance on 20 May 2023 in a 1–0 victory over Legia Warsaw, and was replaced in extra time of the first half to a guard of honour from both teams.

== International career ==
During their spell in Poland, both Paixão and his sibling were repeatedly poised to be called up to the Portugal national team, but nothing came of it.

== Personal life ==
Paixão's twin brother Marco was also a footballer, Flávio being the younger by five minutes.

== Career statistics ==
Appearances and goals by club, season and competition
Club	Season	League			National cup (Note: Includes Copa del Rey, Scottish Cup, Polish Cup)		League cup (Note: Includes Scottish League Cup)		Continental		Other		Total	
Club	Season	Division	Apps	Goals	Apps	Goals	Apps	Goals	Apps	Goals	Apps	Goals	Apps	Goals
Porto B	2005–06	Segunda Divisão	11	1	—		—		—		—		11	1
Villanovense	2006–07	Segunda División B	34	10	—		—		—		—		34	10
Jaén	2007–08	Segunda División B	8	0	1	0	—		—		—		9	0
Benidorm	2007–08	Segunda División B	19	5	0	0	—		—		2 (Note: Appearances in Segunda División B play-offs)	0	21	5
Benidorm	2008–09	Segunda División B	34	6	4	2	—		—		—		38	8
Benidorm	Total		53	11	4	2	—		—		2	0	59	13
Hamilton Academical	2009–10	Scottish Premier League	25	6	2	0	1	0	—		—		28	6
Hamilton Academical	2010–11	Scottish Premier League	30	3	1	1	1	0	—		—		32	4
Hamilton Academical	Total		55	9	3	1	2	0	—		—		60	10
Tractor	2011–12	Iran Pro League	30	10	0	0	—		—		—		30	10
Tractor	2012–13	Iran Pro League	31	10	0	0	—		6 (Note: Appearances in AFC Champions League)	1	—		37	11
Tractor	Total		61	20	0	0	—		6	1	—		67	21
Śląsk Wrocław	2013–14	Ekstraklasa	13	1	0	0	—		—		—		13	1
Śląsk Wrocław	2014–15	Ekstraklasa	37	18	4	1	—		—		—		41	19
Śląsk Wrocław	2015–16	Ekstraklasa	21	5	4	1	—		4 (Note: Appearances in UEFA Europa League)	0	—		29	6
Śląsk Wrocław	Total		71	24	8	2	—		4	0	—		83	26
Lechia Gdańsk	2015–16	Ekstraklasa	16	6	—		—		—		—		16	6
Lechia Gdańsk	2016–17	Ekstraklasa	33	10	2	1	—		—		—		35	11
Lechia Gdańsk	2017–18	Ekstraklasa	34	10	1	0	—		—		—		35	10
Lechia Gdańsk	2018–19	Ekstraklasa	37	15	6	0	—		—		—		43	15
Lechia Gdańsk	2019–20	Ekstraklasa	31	14	6	5	—		2	2	1 (Note: Appearance in Polish Super Cup)	0	40	21
Lechia Gdańsk	2020–21	Ekstraklasa	30	12	3	0	—		—		—		33	12
Lechia Gdańsk	2021–22	Ekstraklasa	32	10	1	0	—		—		—		33	10
Lechia Gdańsk	2022–23	Ekstraklasa	26	7	1	0	—		4 (Note: Appearances in UEFA Europa Conference League)	3	—		31	10
Lechia Gdańsk	Total		239	84	20	6	—		6	5	1	0	266	95
Career total			532	159	36	11	2	0	16	6	3	0	589	176

== Honours ==
Lechia Gdańsk

- Polish Cup: 2018–19
- Polish Super Cup: 2019

Individual

- Polish Cup top scorer: 2019–20
- Ekstraklasa Player of the Month: October 2014, November 2018
