= Sławomir Peszko =

Polish footballer

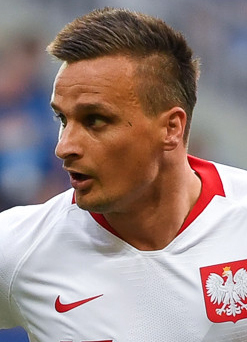
- Peszko playing for Poland at the 2018 FIFA World Cup

Personal information
- Full name: Sławomir Konrad Peszko
- Date of birth: 19 February 1985 (age 41)
- Place of birth: Jasło, Poland
- Height: 1.73 m (5 ft 8 in)
- Position: Midfielder

Team information
- Current team: Wieczysta Kraków (vice-chairman)

Youth career
- Nafta Jedlicze
- Orlen Płock

Senior career*
Years	Team	Apps	(Gls)
2003–2008	Wisła Płock	112	(21)
2008–2011	Lech Poznań	68	(11)
2011–2013	1. FC Köln	43	(2)
2012–2013	→ Wolverhampton Wanderers (loan)	13	(0)
2013–2014	Parma	0	(0)
2013–2014	→ 1. FC Köln (loan)	24	(3)
2014–2015	1. FC Köln	18	(0)
2015–2020	Lechia Gdańsk	100	(12)
2018–2019	→ Wisła Kraków (loan)	14	(3)
2020–2023	Wieczysta Kraków	62	(71)
Total		454	(123)

International career
2004	Poland U19		
2008–2018	Poland	44	(2)

Managerial career
- 2023–2025: Wieczysta Kraków
- * Club domestic league appearances and goals

Sławomir Konrad Peszko ([swaˈvɔmir ˈpɛʂkɔ]; born 19 February 1985) is a Polish professional football manager, executive and former player. He is currently the vice-chairman of Ekstraklasa club Wieczysta Kraków, whom he previously played for and managed.

Peszko has won championships and cup competitions in his native Poland with Wisła Płock, Lech Poznań, and Lechia Gdańsk. Between 2011–2015, Peszko played abroad starting with a move to Germany with 1. FC Köln in 2011, and had short spells in England with Wolverhampton Wanderers, and Italy with Parma.

Peszko was a Polish international player for ten years from 2008–2018 and represented Poland in the 2016 Euro’s and the 2018 World Cup.

== Club career ==
Peszko began his career in the youth ranks of Nafta Jedlicze before moving to Orlen Płock. Here, he made his professional debut on 28 August 2002 as a substitute in a Polish Cup tie against Jagiellonka Nieszawa. He made his league debut later on during the 2002–03 season and during the following campaign became a regular starter.

With Wisła Płock, he won both the Polish Cup and Supercup in 2006 and also featured for them in the qualifying rounds of that season's UEFA Cup competition. However, Płock were relegated in 2007 and Peszko remained with them for their I Liga campaign, during which he scored 16 goals in 26 appearances.

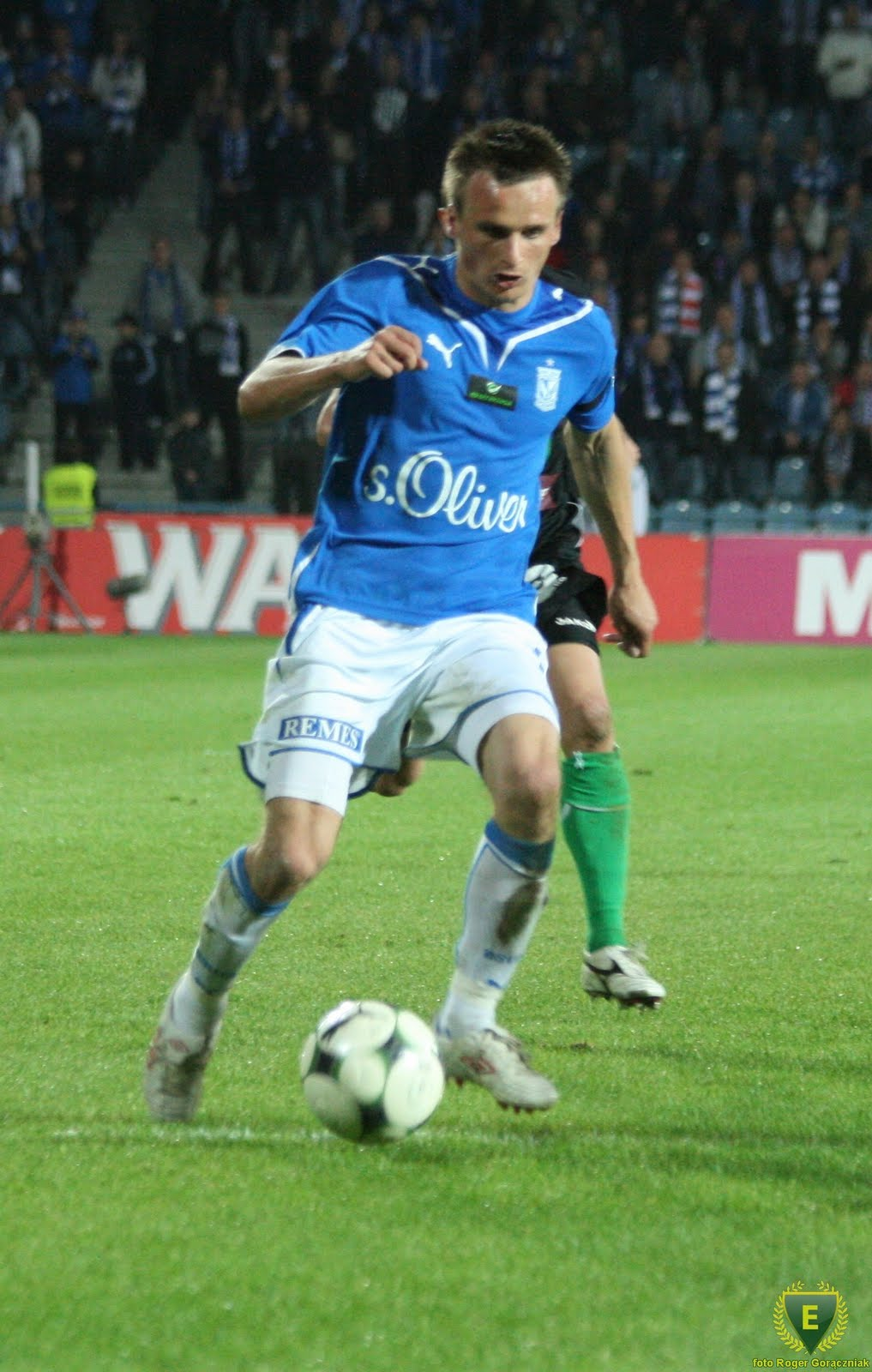
Peszko playing for Lech Poznań in 2010

In June 2008, he returned to the top flight when he signed for Lech Poznań after his contract with Płock expired. His first season ended with him winning the Polish Cup for a second time, after he netted the only goal of the final against Ruch Chorzów. In his second season Peszko finished as the leading assist-maker in the league (with 14 assists), alongside his eight goals which helped the club win the league title.

Peszko moved to the Bundesliga in January 2011, initially signing for 1. FC Köln until the end of the season. He underwent a medical before joining the club, where it was discovered he has four kidneys. His contract was extended during the season, but his first full campaign with the club proved a troubled one as the club were relegated. Shortly before the end of the season, Peszko was arrested for drunken behaviour in a taxi, which earned him a €25,000 fine and saw him expelled from the Köln squad for their next fixture.

On 9 August 2012, Peszko joined English side Wolverhampton Wanderers on a season long loan deal. Here, he reunited with his former Köln manager Ståle Solbakken. In October 2012, he suffered a torn medial ligament that kept him out of action for three months. His first game back after the injury was a 1–0 loss against Luton Town in the FA Cup as a substitute in the 66th minute. Two hours after the defeat, Ståle Solbakken was sacked and then Peszko was deemed surplus to requirements by Dean Saunders. The season ended with Wolves getting relegated to League One and Peszko returning to Cologne.

On 31 July 2013, it was announced that 1. FC Köln had sold Peszko to the Italian club Parma, and loaned him back until the end of the 2013–14 season. After the season they got him back permanently.

He joined Lechia Gdańsk in 2015, where he won the 2018–19 Cup and 2019 Super Cup. After a final season where he made 18 appearances and scored 3 goals, in 2020 he terminated his contract due to unpaid wages.

On 15 June 2020, he joined regional league club Wieczysta Kraków on a professional deal. On 5 June 2023, Peszko announced that he would retire at the end of the season.

== International career ==
Peszko made his international debut for the Poland national team on 19 November 2008 in a 3–2 friendly win against the Republic of Ireland. He scored his first goal for Poland on 17 January 2010 in a 3–1 loss to Denmark.

In May 2018, he was named in Poland's preliminary 35-man squad for the 2018 FIFA World Cup in Russia.

== Managerial career ==
In early 2023, Peszko obtained the UEFA A coaching license. On 18 September that year, following Maciej Musiał's dismissal from Wieczysta, he took charge of his previous club as a caretaker manager, but as the season progressed, his appointment was made permanent. On 18 May 2024, Wieczysta secured promotion to II liga, after winning group IV of the III liga with three games to spare. On 18 April 2025, with the club sitting second in the league table, he was relieved of his duties following a 2–2 draw against Świt Szczecin.

On 27 June 2025, Peszko was appointed Wieczysta's vice-chairman.

== Career statistics ==
=== Club ===
Appearances and goals by club, season and competition
Club	Season	League			National cup (Note: Includes Polish Cup, DFB-Pokal, FA Cup)		League cup (Note: Includes Ekstraklasa Cup, Football League Cup)		Europe		Other		Total	
Club	Season	Division	Apps	Goals	Apps	Goals	Apps	Goals	Apps	Goals	Apps	Goals	Apps	Goals
Wisła Płock	2002–03	Ekstraklasa	4	0	4	0	—		—		—		8	0
Wisła Płock	2003–04	Ekstraklasa	20	1	0	0	—		—		—		20	1
Wisła Płock	2004–05	Ekstraklasa	20	1	6	0	—		—		—		26	1
Wisła Płock	2005–06	Ekstraklasa	21	1	9	2	—		2 (Note: Appearances in UEFA Cup)	0	—		32	3
Wisła Płock	2006–07	Ekstraklasa	21	2	4	1	4	3	—		—		29	6
Wisła Płock	2007–08	I liga	26	16	1	0	—		—		—		27	16
Wisła Płock	Total		112	21	24	3	4	3	2	0	—		142	27
Lech Poznań	2008–09	Ekstraklasa	25	0	7	2	—		10	3	—		42	5
Lech Poznań	2009–10	Ekstraklasa	28	8	1	0	—		2 (Note: Appearances in UEFA Europa League)	2	1 (Note: Appearance in Polish Super Cup)	0	32	10
Lech Poznań	2010–11	Ekstraklasa	15	3	1	1	—		10 (Note: Four appearances in UEFA Champions League, six appearances and one goal in UEFA Europa League)	1	1	0	27	5
Lech Poznań	Total		68	11	9	3	—		22	6	2	0	101	20
1. FC Köln	2010–11	Bundesliga	11	0	0	0	—		—		—		11	0
1. FC Köln	2011–12	Bundesliga	32	2	2	0	—		—		—		34	2
1. FC Köln	Total		43	2	2	0	—		—		—		45	2
Wolverhampton Wanderers (loan)	2012–13	Championship	13	0	1	0	2	0	—		—		16	0
1. FC Köln (loan)	2013–14	2. Bundesliga	24	3	2	0	—		—		—		26	3
1. FC Köln	2014–15	Bundesliga	18	0	1	0	—		—		—		19	0
Lechia Gdańsk	2015–16	Ekstraklasa	27	2	1	0	—		—		—		28	2
Lechia Gdańsk	2016–17	Ekstraklasa	29	3	0	0	—		—		—		29	3
Lechia Gdańsk	2017–18	Ekstraklasa	25	4	1	0	—		—		—		26	4
Lechia Gdańsk	2018–19	Ekstraklasa	1	0	0	0	—		—		—		1	0
Lechia Gdańsk	2019–20	Ekstraklasa	18	3	2	0	—		2	0	1	0	23	3
Lechia Gdańsk	Total		100	12	4	0	—		2	0	1	0	107	12
Wisła Kraków (loan)	2018–19	Ekstraklasa	14	3	—		—		—		—		14	3
Wieczysta Kraków	2020–21	Regional league Krak. II	25	40	—		—		—		—		25	40
Wieczysta Kraków	2021–22	IV liga Lesser Poland	31	30	2	0	—		—		—		33	30
Wieczysta Kraków	2022–23	III liga, gr. IV	6	1	0	0	—		—		—		6	1
Wieczysta Kraków	Total		62	71	2	0	—		—		—		64	71
Career total			454	123	45	6	6	3	26	6	3	0	534	138

=== International ===
Appearances and goals by national team and year
National team	Year	Apps	Goals
Poland	2008	1	0
Poland	2009	6	0
Poland	2010	9	1
Poland	2011	8	0
Poland	2012	1	0
Poland	2013	2	0
Poland	2014	2	0
Poland	2015	6	1
Poland	2016	7	0
Poland	2017	1	0
Poland	2018	1	0
Total		44	2

Scores and results list Poland's goal tally first, score column indicates score after each Peszko goal.

List of international goals scored by Sławomir Peszko
No.	Date	Venue	Opponent	Score	Result	Competition
1	17 January 2010	80th Birthday Stadium, Nakhon Ratchasima, Thailand	Denmark	1–1	1–3	2010 King's Cup
2	29 March 2015	Aviva Stadium, Dublin, Ireland	Republic of Ireland	1–0	1–1	UEFA Euro 2016 qualifying

== Managerial statistics ==
As of match played 17 April 2025

Managerial record by team and tenure
Team	From	To	Record							
Team	From	To	G	W	D	L	GF	GA	GD	Win %
Wieczysta Kraków	18 September 2023	18 April 2025	55	38	8	9	133	46	+87	69.09
Total			55	38	8	9	133	46	+87	69.09

== Honours ==
=== Player ===
Wisła Płock

- Polish Cup: 2005–06

Lech Poznań

- Ekstraklasa: 2009–10
- Polish Cup: 2008–09
- Polish Super Cup: 2009

1. FC Köln

- 2. Bundesliga: 2013–14

Lechia Gdańsk

- Polish Super Cup: 2019

Wieczysta Kraków

- IV liga Lesser Poland West: 2021–22
- Regional league, group: Kraków II: 2020–21
- Polish Cup (Lesser Poland regionals): 2020–21, 2021–22
- Polish Cup (Kraków regionals): 2020–21

Individual

- Ekstraklasa Player of the Month: August 2009

=== Manager ===
Wieczysta Kraków

- III liga, group IV: 2023–24
