= Paweł Stolarski =

Polish footballer

Personal information
- Full name: Paweł Stolarski
- Date of birth: 28 January 1996 (age 30)
- Place of birth: Kraków, Poland
- Height: 1.81 m (5 ft 11 in)
- Position: Right-back

Team information
- Current team: Orzeł Ryczów

Youth career
- 2003–2012: Wisła Kraków

Senior career*
Years	Team	Apps	(Gls)
2012–2014	Wisła Kraków	14	(0)
2014–2018	Lechia Gdańsk	79	(1)
2014–2015	Lechia Gdańsk II	4	(0)
2014–2015	→ Zagłębie Lubin (loan)	8	(0)
2015	→ Zagłębie Lubin II (loan)	2	(0)
2018–2020	Legia Warsaw	31	(1)
2020	Legia Warsaw II	2	(0)
2021–2024	Pogoń Szczecin	42	(0)
2021–2023	Pogoń Szczecin II	7	(0)
2024–2026	Motor Lublin	71	(2)
2026–	Orzeł Ryczów	0	(0)

International career
2011	Poland U15	1	(1)
2012–2013	Poland U17	9	(3)
2014	Poland U18	2	(0)
2013–2015	Poland U19	11	(1)
2015–2017	Poland U20	10	(0)
2015–2019	Poland U21	8	(0)
- * Club domestic league appearances and goals as of 22:01, 2 July 2026 (UTC)

Paweł Stolarski (born 28 January 1996) is a Polish professional footballer who plays as a right-back for IV liga Lesser Poland club Orzeł Ryczów.

== Club career ==
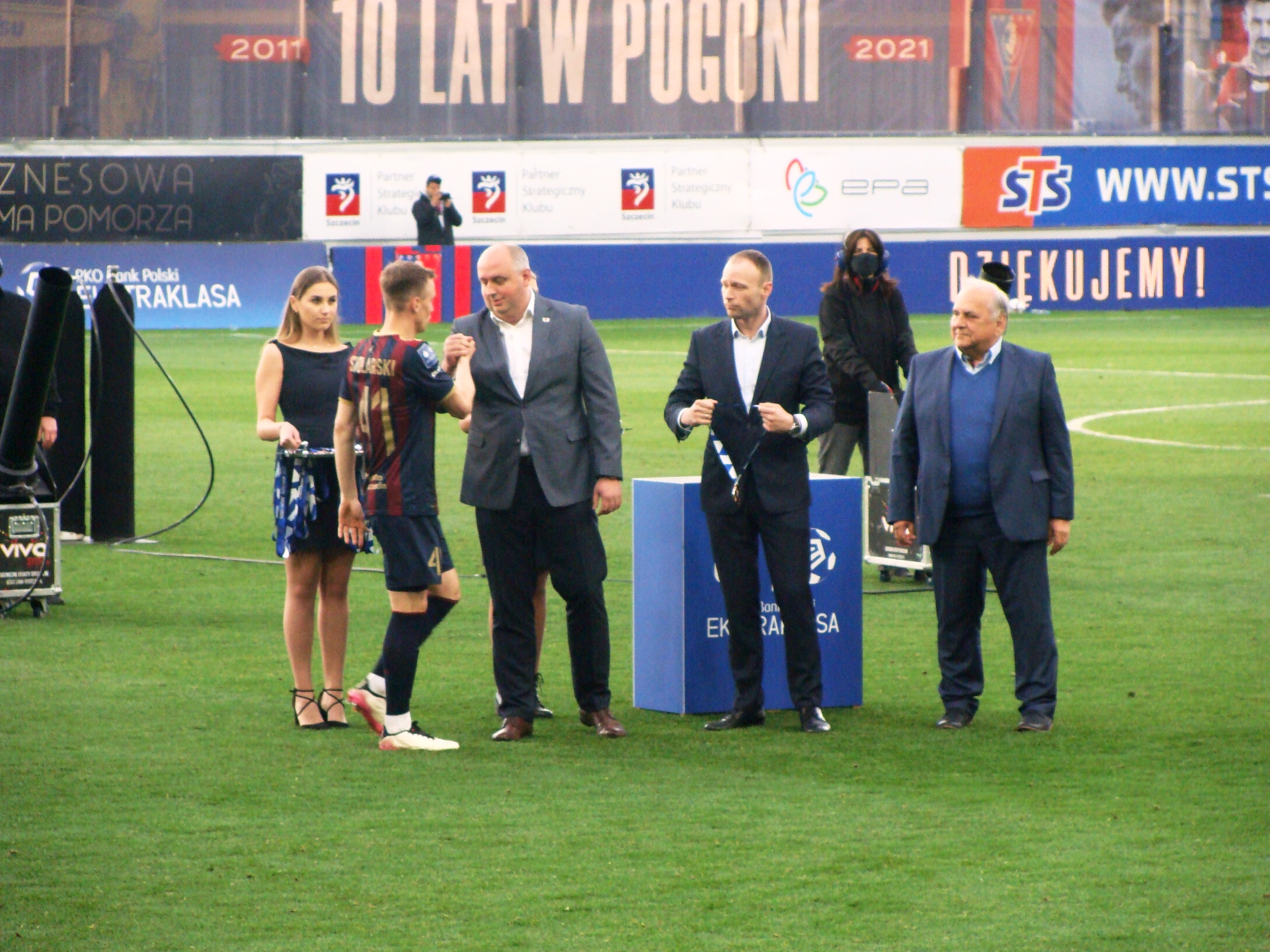
Stolarski receinving a bronze medal after finishing third in the 2020-21 Ekstraklasa season with Pogoń Szczecin.

On 28 February 2013, Stolarski made his debut, aged 17, for Wisła Kraków in the Polish Cup match against Jagiellonia Białystok. After that, he played for Lechia Gdańsk.

== International career ==
Stolarski played for Poland national under-17 football team during 2013 UEFA Under-17 Championship qualifying round, scoring two game-winning goals. He was the captain of the national side during the 2013 UEFA European Under-17 Football Championship elite round.

== Career statistics ==
As of match played 23 May 2026

Appearances and goals by club, season and competition
Club	Season	League			Polish Cup		Europe		Other		Total	
Club	Season	Division	Apps	Goals	Apps	Goals	Apps	Goals	Apps	Goals	Apps	Goals
Wisła Kraków	2012–13	Ekstraklasa	5	0	2	0	—		—		7	0
Wisła Kraków	2013–14	Ekstraklasa	9	0	2	0	—		—		11	0
Wisła Kraków	Total		14	0	4	0	—		—		18	0
Lechia Gdańsk	2013–14	Ekstraklasa	5	0	1	0	—		—		6	0
Lechia Gdańsk	2015–16	Ekstraklasa	21	1	1	0	—		—		22	1
Lechia Gdańsk	2016–17	Ekstraklasa	24	0	2	0	—		—		26	0
Lechia Gdańsk	2017–18	Ekstraklasa	25	0	1	0	—		—		26	0
Lechia Gdańsk	2018–19	Ekstraklasa	4	0	0	0	—		—		4	0
Lechia Gdańsk	Total		79	1	5	0	—		—		84	1
Lechia Gdańsk II	2013–14	III liga, gr. D	2	0	—		—		—		2	0
Lechia Gdańsk II	2015–16	III liga, gr. D	2	0	—		—		—		2	0
Lechia Gdańsk II	Total		4	0	—		—		—		4	0
Zagłębie Lubin (loan)	2014–15	I liga	8	0	0	0	—		—		8	0
Zagłębie Lubin II (loan)	2014–15	III liga, gr. E	2	0	—		—		—		2	0
Legia Warsaw	2018–19	Ekstraklasa	14	1	4	0	—		—		18	1
Legia Warsaw	2019–20	Ekstraklasa	13	0	3	0	4 (Note: Appearances in UEFA Europa League)	1	—		20	1
Legia Warsaw	2020–21	Ekstraklasa	4	0	1	0	0	0	1 (Note: Appearance in Polish Super Cup)	0	6	0
Legia Warsaw	Total		31	1	8	0	4	0	1	0	44	1
Legia Warsaw II	2020–21	III liga, gr. I	2	0	—		—		—		2	0
Pogoń Szczecin	2020–21	Ekstraklasa	5	0	—		—		—		18	1
Pogoń Szczecin	2021–22	Ekstraklasa	17	0	0	0	1 (Note: Appearances in UEFA Europa Conference League)	1	—		18	0
Pogoń Szczecin	2022–23	Ekstraklasa	16	0	2	0	1	0	—		19	0
Pogoń Szczecin	2023–24	Ekstraklasa	4	0	1	0	1	0	—		6	0
Pogoń Szczecin	Total		42	0	3	0	3	0	—		48	0
Pogoń Szczecin II	2020–21	III liga, gr. II	1	0	—		—		—		1	0
Pogoń Szczecin II	2021–22	III liga, gr. II	2	0	—		—		—		2	0
Pogoń Szczecin II	2022–23	III liga, gr. II	3	0	0	0	—		—		3	0
Pogoń Szczecin II	2023–24	III liga, gr. II	1	0	—		—		—		1	0
Pogoń Szczecin II	Total		7	0	0	0	—		—		7	0
Motor Lublin	2023–24	I liga	13	0	—		—		2 (Note: Appearances in I liga promotion play-offs)	0	15	0
Motor Lublin	2024–25	Ekstraklasa	27	2	0	0	—		—		27	2
Motor Lublin	2025–26	Ekstraklasa	29	0	0	0	—		—		29	0
Motor Lublin	Total		69	2	0	0	—		2	0	71	2
Orzeł Ryczów	2026–27	IV liga Lesser Poland	0	0	—		—		—		0	0
Career total			258	4	20	0	7	0	3	0	288	4

== Honours ==
Zagłębie Lubin

- I liga: 2014–15

Legia Warsaw

- Ekstraklasa: 2019–20, 2020–21
