= Lukáš Haraslín =

Slovak international footballer

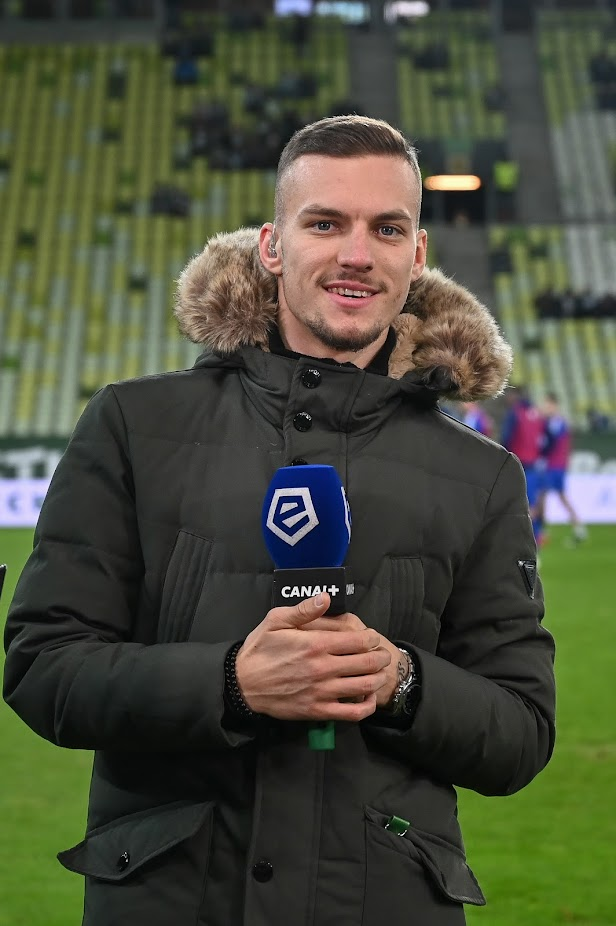
- Haraslín in 2019

Personal information
- Date of birth: 26 May 1996 (age 30)
- Place of birth: Bratislava, Slovakia
- Height: 1.82 m (6 ft 0 in)
- Position: Winger

Team information
- Current team: Al Fateh
- Number: 10

Youth career
- 2000–2005: FK Lamač
- 2005–2013: Slovan Bratislava
- 2013–2015: Parma

Senior career*
Years	Team	Apps	(Gls)
2014–2015	Parma	2	(0)
2015–2020	Lechia Gdańsk	108	(12)
2020	→ Sassuolo (loan)	11	(1)
2020–2022	Sassuolo	14	(0)
2021–2022	→ Sparta Prague (loan)	29	(4)
2022–2026	Sparta Prague	100	(44)
2026–	Al Fateh	11	(3)

International career^{‡}
2011–2012	Slovakia U16	10	(3)
2012–2013	Slovakia U17	15	(3)
2014	Slovakia U18	2	(2)
2013–2015	Slovakia U19	8	(0)
2014–2018	Slovakia U21	11	(4)
2019–	Slovakia	58	(11)
- * Club domestic league appearances and goals as of 22 October 2026 ‡ National team caps and goals as of 18 November 2026

Lukáš Haraslín (born 26 May 1996) is a Slovak professional footballer who plays as a winger for Saudi Pro League club Al Fateh and the Slovakia national team.

== Club career ==
=== Parma ===
In the 2012/13 season, Haraslín joined the academy of Parma Calcio. He debuted with Parma in Primavera against Juventus on 2 November 2013, coming on as a substitute for Marco Boscolo Zemelo in the 54th minute. Parma lost the game 2–3. Just a week later Haraslín was already a part of the starting line-up for a 1–0 victory over Bologna. However, his season was cut short by an injury that would rule him out between January and March 2014, leading to only nine starts during the season. Despite this, by the end of the season, Haraslín managed to score his first two goals against Modena in a 5–0 victory on 12 April 2014.

In the subsequent season, Haraslín played over twice as many games (20), scoring 9 goals, particularly between November and January, when he scored in 5 of 7 games he started, tallying a total of 7 goals. This won him promotion for the senior team. Haraslín debuted for Parma in the Serie A in an 3–1 away loss against AC Milan, coming on off the bench in the 77th minute. He would receive a six from the Gazzetta dello Sport for his performance. On 1 February 2015, Haraslín replaced Silvestre Varela in the 77th minute of the 1–3 loss at San Siro. The same year in May, Haraslín returned to the senior team, as he substituted Abdelkader Ghezzal, in a match against Fiorentina (0–3 loss).

=== Lechia Gdańsk ===
==== 2015–16 ====
On 7 July 2015, Haraslín joined Lechia Gdańsk on a three-year deal, although an apparent interest was reported from numerous clubs, yet some only requested Haraslín on a loan.

Haraslín scored his first league goal for Lechia Gdańsk on 16 August 2015 against Wisła Kraków. Although he was only a second-half substitute for Bruno Nazário, Haraslín scored just after four minutes on the pitch, making the score 2–2 in a game which eventually finished 3–3. The following week, Haraslín scored twice in a 3–1 victory against Górnik Łęczna. In late October Haraslín suffered an injury that kept him out of action until early December. After he returned, he played in almost all of the games, although mostly as a substitute. He completed the season with 3 goals in 20 games.

==== 2016–17 ====
At the beginning of the 2017–18 season it was announced the Haraslín had extended his contract with Lechia, prolonging it until June 2020.

==== 2018–19 ====
During the 2018–19 Ekstraklasa, in addition to 4 league goals, Haraslín scored his first Polish Cup goal in a second round 3–1 victory over Resovia Rzeszów, after a pass from Jarosław Kubicki. In January 2019, Haraslín was named Lechia's fan-favourite player of 2018.

In January 2019, it was reported that Galatasaray had notable interest in Haraslín's services, yet even Inter Milan, A.S. Roma, Atalanta Bergamo and Dijon were reportedly interested. However, the transfer did not advance as Lechia was in a battle for the championship. In an article published on 17 May 2019, Michał Gałęzewski stated that Lechia appears to lack a replacement for Haraslín and while a move was expectable and comprehensible, he noted it may not happen. Even due to an injury and poor performances in late May, Rafał Sumowski from Troj Miasto also stated that Lechia seemed to lack a replacement for him.

Haraslín started in the 1–0 Polish Cup final win against Jagiellonia Białystok, playing the entire match at Warsaw's National Stadium as Lechia won the cup. While this was Haraslín's first trophy in Poland, his fellow Slovak goalkeeper Dušan Kuciak won his fifth cup trophy this season. The victory made Lechia eligible for the 2nd qualifying round of the Europa League.

Haraslín also played an important role during the 2018–19 season as Lechia finished third in the league, Lechia's joint highest finish in the league.

==== 2019–20 ====
The 2019–20 season saw the club qualify for the 2019–20 UEFA Europa League and play in the Polish Super Cup. Haraslín scored twice in the Super Cup final as Lechia beat Piast Gliwice 3–1. In the Europa League, Lechia was drawn against Brøndby IF. Haraslín played in both games as Lechia lost the tie 5–3 on aggregate. Haraslín made his 100th appearance for Lechia in July 2019 against Wisła Kraków. In total, Haraslín made 121 appearances for Lechia with 16 goals in all competitions.

=== Later career ===
In January 2020, Haraslín went on loan to Italian club Sassuolo, with having an obligation to buy at the end of the loan period.

In August 2021, Haraslín went on loan to Czech side Sparta Prague with an option to buy at the end of the loan period. On 23 February 2024, he signed permanently a new multi-year contract.

On 16 July 2025, Haraslín was named Sparta's captain and signed a new multi-year contract.

On 12 August 2026, Haraslín signed a contract with Saudi Pro League club Al Fateh until 2029.

== International career ==
=== Youth ===
For over two years, Haraslín was listed as a back-up footballer in the Slovak youth national team nominations by Ján Kozák and Pavel Hapal. Subsequently, the core of the U21 squad became known as Hapal's children, including Haraslín himself.

=== Senior ===
On 28 May 2019, Haraslín was called up for a June home friendly match against Jordan and UEFA Euro 2020 qualifying fixture against Azerbaijan. He debuted against the former opponent at the Anton Malatinský Stadium in Trnava on 7 June 2019. Haraslín utilised his speed against the tiring Jordanian defenders, who had just recently completed the fasting of Ramadan. After the match, Haraslín was reported to receive the unofficial title of the man of the match in his debut.

In December 2022, Haraslín was called up for senior national team prospective players' training camp at NTC Senec as one of the experienced leading players in the squad due to his previous absence last autumn. With praise from national team manager Francesco Calzona for his recent form, Haraslín returned ahead of two home qualifiers against Luxembourg and Bosnia and Herzegovina.

On 7 June 2024, he appeared in the list of 26 Slovak players selected by Calzona to participate in UEFA Euro 2024.

== Personal life ==
On 27 October 2020, Haraslín tested positive for COVID-19 amid its outbreak in Italy.

== Career statistics ==
=== Club ===
As of match played 13 September 2026

Appearances and goals by club, season and competition
Club	Season	League			National cup (Note: Includes Polish Cup, Coppa Italia, Czech Cup)		Europe		Other		Total	
Club	Season	Division	Apps	Goals	Apps	Goals	Apps	Goals	Apps	Goals	Apps	Goals
Parma	2014–15	Serie A	2	0	0	0	—		—		2	0
Lechia Gdańsk	2015–16	Ekstraklasa	20	3	1	0	—		—		21	3
Lechia Gdańsk	2016–17	Ekstraklasa	26	3	1	0	—		—		27	3
Lechia Gdańsk	2017–18	Ekstraklasa	11	0	0	0	—		—		11	0
Lechia Gdańsk	2018–19	Ekstraklasa	33	4	5	1	—		—		38	5
Lechia Gdańsk	2019–20	Ekstraklasa	18	2	3	1	2 (Note: Appearances in UEFA Europa League)	0	1 (Note: Appearance in Polish Super Cup)	2	24	5
Lechia Gdańsk	Total		108	12	10	2	2	0	1	2	121	16
Sassuolo	2019–20	Serie A	11	1	0	0	—		—		11	1
Sassuolo	2020–21	Serie A	14	0	1	0	—		—		15	0
Sassuolo	2021–22	Serie A	0	0	0	0	—		—		0	0
Sassuolo	Total		25	1	1	0	—		—		26	1
Sparta Prague (loan)	2021–22	Czech First League	29	4	1	0	8 (Note: Six appearances and two goals in UEFA Europa League, two appearances in UEFA Europa Conference League)	2	—		38	6
Sparta Prague	2022–23	Czech First League	22	7	4	1	2 (Note: Appearances in UEFA Conference League)	0	—		28	8
Sparta Prague	2023–24	Czech First League	28	12	2	0	13 (Note: Two appearances in UEFA Champions League, nine appearances and four goals in UEFA Europa League)	4	—		43	16
Sparta Prague	2024–25	Czech First League	22	11	3	1	11 (Note: Appearances in UEFA Champions League)	2	—		36	14
Sparta Prague	2025–26	Czech First League	27	13	0	0	13	2	—		40	15
Sparta Prague	Total		99	43	9	2	39	8	—		147	53
Al Fateh	2026–27	Saudi Pro League	7	1	1	0	—		—		8	1
Career total			270	61	22	4	49	10	1	2	342	76

=== International ===
As of match played 16 November 2026

Appearances and goals by national team and year
National team	Year	Apps	Goals
Slovakia	2019	8	1
Slovakia	2020	5	0
Slovakia	2021	9	1
Slovakia	2022	5	0
Slovakia	2023	5	3
Slovakia	2024	12	2
Slovakia	2025	5	0
Slovakia	2026	9	3
Total		58	11

As of match played on 13 November 2026
Scores and results list Slovakia's goal tally first, score column indicates score after each Haraslín goal.

List of international goals scored by Lukáš Haraslín
No.	Date	Venue	Opponent	Score	Result	Competition
1	7 June 2019	Štadión Antona Malatinského, Trnava, Slovakia	Jordan	1–1	5–1	Friendly
2	11 October 2021	Gradski Vrt Stadium, Osijek, Croatia	Croatia	2–1	2–2	2022 FIFA World Cup qualification
3	26 March 2023	Tehelné pole, Bratislava, Slovakia	Bosnia and Herzegovina	2–0	2–0	UEFA Euro 2024 qualification
4	17 November 2023	Tehelné pole, Bratislava, Slovakia	Iceland	3–1	4–2	UEFA Euro 2024 qualification
5	17 November 2023	Tehelné pole, Bratislava, Slovakia	Iceland	4–1	4–2	UEFA Euro 2024 qualification
6	5 June 2024	Wiener Neustadt Arena, Wiener Neustadt, Austria	San Marino	3–0	4–0	Friendly
7	14 October 2024	Tofiq Bahramov Republican Stadium, Baku, Azerbaijan	Azerbaijan	1–2	1–3	2024–25 UEFA Nations League C
8	26 March 2026	Tehelné pole, Bratislava, Slovakia	Kosovo	2–1	3–4	2026 FIFA World Cup qualification
9	1 June 2026	MOL Aréna, Dunajská Streda, Slovakia	Malta	1–0	2–1	Friendly
10	6 October 2026	Zimbru Stadium, Chișinău, Moldova	Moldova	4–0	4–0	2026–27 UEFA Nations League C
11	13 November 2026	Košická futbalová aréna, Košice, Slovakia	Faroe Islands	2–2	2–2	2026–27 UEFA Nations League C

== Honours ==
Lechia Gdańsk

- Polish Cup: 2018–19
- Polish Super Cup: 2019

Sparta Prague

- Czech First League: 2022–23, 2023–24
- Czech Cup: 2023–24
