= Florian Schikowski =

German-Polish footballer

Personal information
- Date of birth: 10 June 1998 (age 28)
- Place of birth: Düsseldorf, Germany
- Height: 1.81 m (5 ft 11 in)
- Position: Defensive midfielder

Team information
- Current team: 1. FC Wülfrath
- Number: 27

Youth career
- –2005: SC Unterbach
- 2005–2012: Bayer Leverkusen
- 2012–2017: Borussia Mönchengladbach

Senior career*
Years	Team	Apps	(Gls)
2017–2020	Lechia Gdańsk	4	(0)
2018	Lechia Gdańsk II	3	(2)
2018–2019	→ SV Straelen (loan)	20	(1)
2020–	TVD Velbert	57	(13)
2023–2024	1. FC Monheim	32	(22)
2024–	1. FC Wülfrath	56	(21)

International career
2015–2016	Poland U18	5	(0)
2016–2017	Poland U19	9	(1)
2017	Poland U20	2	(1)
- * Club domestic league appearances and goals as of 21:40, 1 June 2026 (UTC)

Florian Schikowski (born 10 June 1998) is a Polish professional footballer who plays as a defensive midfielder for 1. FC Wülfrath. Born and raised in Germany, he also holds German citizenship.

He is the younger brother of fellow footballer Patrick Schikowski.
