= Grzegorz Wojtkowiak =

Polish footballer

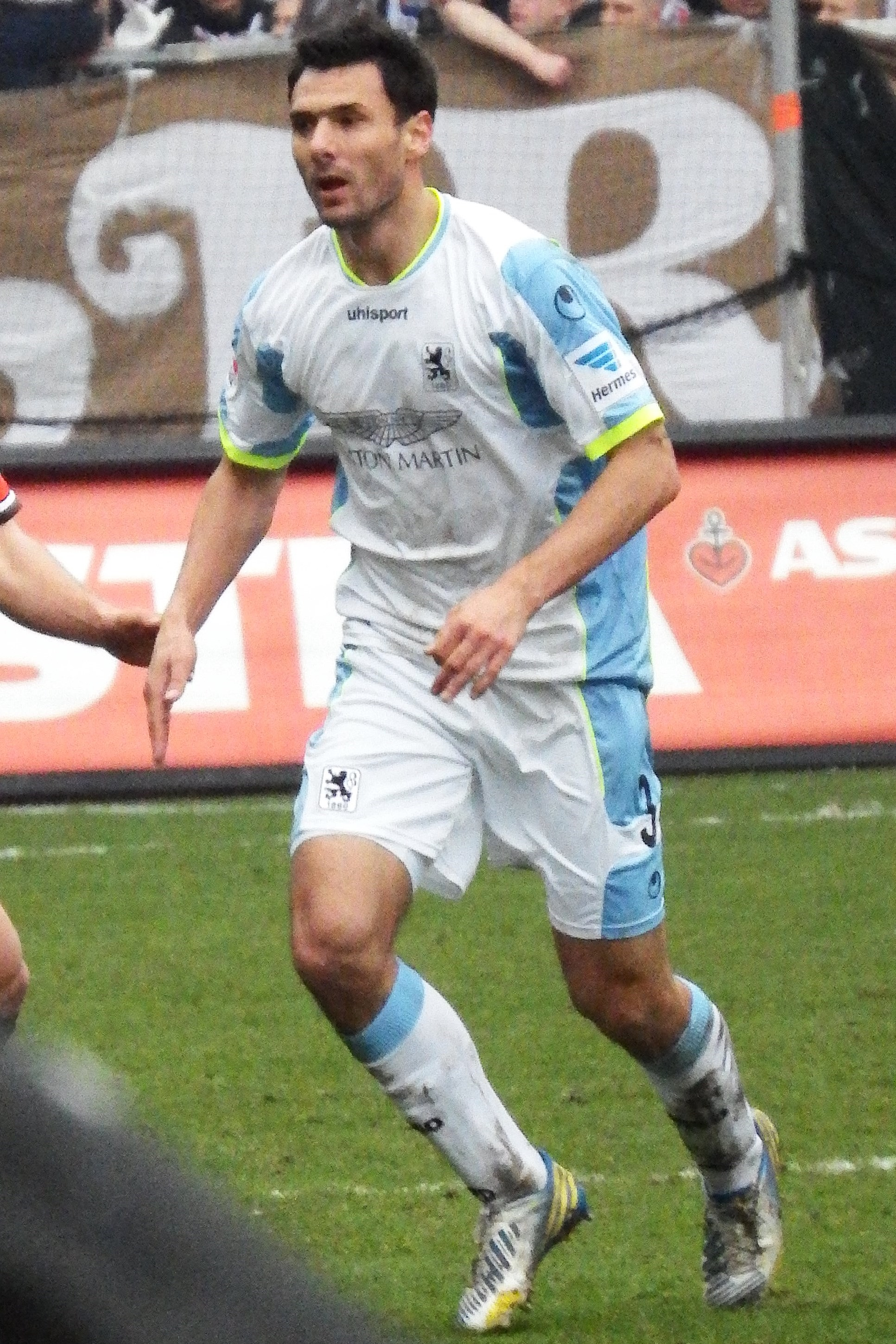
- Wojtkowiak in 2013

Personal information
- Date of birth: 26 January 1984 (age 42)
- Place of birth: Kostrzyn nad Odrą, Poland
- Height: 1.84 m (6 ft 0 in)
- Position: Right-back

Team information
- Current team: Dynamo Kyiv (assistant)

Youth career
- Celuloza Kostrzyn nad Odrą

Senior career*
Years	Team	Apps	(Gls)
2003–2006	Amica Wronki	33	(0)
2006–2012	Lech Poznań	109	(3)
2012–2015	1860 Munich	63	(3)
2015–2019	Lechia Gdańsk	73	(3)
2018–2019	Lechia Gdańsk II	21	(0)
2019–2021	Lech Poznań II	45	(1)
Total		344	(10)

International career
2008–2014	Poland	23	(0)

Managerial career
- 2023: Lech Poznań U17
- 2024–2026: Lech Poznań II
- * Club domestic league appearances and goals

Grzegorz Wojtkowiak (Polish pronunciation: [ˈɡʐɛɡɔʐ vɔjtˈkɔvjak]; born 26 January 1984) is a Polish professional football manager and former player who is currently an assistant coach of Ukrainian Premier League club Dynamo Kyiv.

== International career ==
He debuted for the Poland national team in a 0–2 away win over San Marino on 10 September 2008. He was part of the roster for the UEFA Euro 2012 held in Poland and Ukraine, but remained benched for all three games played in the tournament by the co-hosts. He earned a total of 23 caps and made his final appearance in a 2–1 friendly win against Lithuania on 6 June 2014.

== Managerial career ==
Shortly after retiring from professional football in mid-2021, Wojtkowiak joined the technical staff of Lech Poznań's academy, starting off as an assistant coach of the under-19 team. In July 2023, he took charge of Lech's under-17s, before moving up to Lech's senior team in December 2023 to work as an assistant under Mariusz Rumak.

On 28 May 2024, three days after Lech's reserve side was relegated to the fourth division, Wojtkowiak was appointed as their new manager on a three-year contract. He was sacked on 7 April 2026.

On 22 October 2026, Wojtkowiak joined Ukrainian side Dynamo Kyiv as an assistant coach under caretaker manager Maciej Kędziorek.

== Career statistics ==
=== Club ===
Appearances and goals by club, season and competition
Club	Season	League			National cup (Note: Includes Polish Cup, DFB-Pokal)		Europe		Other		Total	
Club	Season	Division	Apps	Goals	Apps	Goals	Apps	Goals	Apps	Goals	Apps	Goals
Amica Wronki	2003–04	Ekstraklasa	8	0	0	0	—		—		8	0
Amica Wronki	2004–05	Ekstraklasa	9	0	1	0	1 (Note: Appearance(s) in UEFA Cup)	0	—		11	0
Amica Wronki	2005–06	Ekstraklasa	16	0	4	0	—		—		20	0
Amica Wronki	Total		33	0	5	0	1	0	—		39	0
Lech Poznań	2006–07	Ekstraklasa	19	0	3	0	2 (Note: Appearances in UEFA Intertoto Cup)	0	2 (Note: Appearances in Ekstraklasa Cup)	0	26	0
Lech Poznań	2007–08	Ekstraklasa	11	1	0	0	—		3	0	14	1
Lech Poznań	2008–09	Ekstraklasa	21	0	3	0	12	0	—		36	0
Lech Poznań	2009–10	Ekstraklasa	18	1	1	0	0	0	0	0	19	1
Lech Poznań	2010–11	Ekstraklasa	16	0	2	0	9 (Note: Four appearances in UEFA Champions League, five appearances in UEFA Europa League)	0	0	0	27	0
Lech Poznań	2011–12	Ekstraklasa	24	1	4	1	—		—		28	2
Lech Poznań	Total		109	3	13	1	23	0	5	0	150	4
1860 Munich	2012–13	2. Bundesliga	28	1	2	0	—		—		30	1
1860 Munich	2013–14	2. Bundesliga	26	2	2	0	—		—		28	2
1860 Munich	2014–15	2. Bundesliga	9	0	0	0	—		—		9	0
1860 Munich	Total		63	3	4	0	—		—		67	3
Lechia Gdańsk	2014–15	Ekstraklasa	16	0	0	0	—		—		16	0
Lechia Gdańsk	2015–16	Ekstraklasa	28	2	2	0	—		—		30	2
Lechia Gdańsk	2016–17	Ekstraklasa	16	1	2	0	—		—		18	1
Lechia Gdańsk	2017–18	Ekstraklasa	13	0	1	0	—		—		14	0
Lechia Gdańsk	Total		73	3	5	0	—		—		78	3
Lechia Gdańsk II	2018–19	IV liga Pomerania	21	0	2	1	—		—		23	1
Lech Poznań II	2019–20	II liga	26	0	—		—		—		26	0
Lech Poznań II	2020–21	II liga	19	1	1	0	—		—		20	1
Lech Poznań II	Total		45	1	1	0	—		—		46	1
Career total			344	10	30	2	24	0	5	0	403	12

=== International ===
Appearances and goals by national team and year
National team	Year	Apps	Goals
Poland	2008	2	0
Poland	2010	8	0
Poland	2011	7	0
Poland	2012	3	0
Poland	2013	2	0
Poland	2014	1	0
Total		23	0

== Managerial statistics ==
As of match played 4 April 2026

Managerial record by team and tenure
Team	From	To	Record							
Team	From	To	G	W	D	L	GF	GA	GD	Win %
Lech Poznań II	28 May 2024	7 April 2026	66	31	15	20	129	90	+39	46.97
Career total			66	31	15	20	129	90	+39	46.97

== Honours ==
Lech Poznań

- Ekstraklasa: 2009–10
- Polish Cup: 2008–09
