= Florian Krygier Municipal Stadium =

Football stadium in Szczecin, Poland

Coordinates: 53°26′12″N 14°31′07″E

- Stadion Miejski im. Floriana Krygiera
- Paprikana
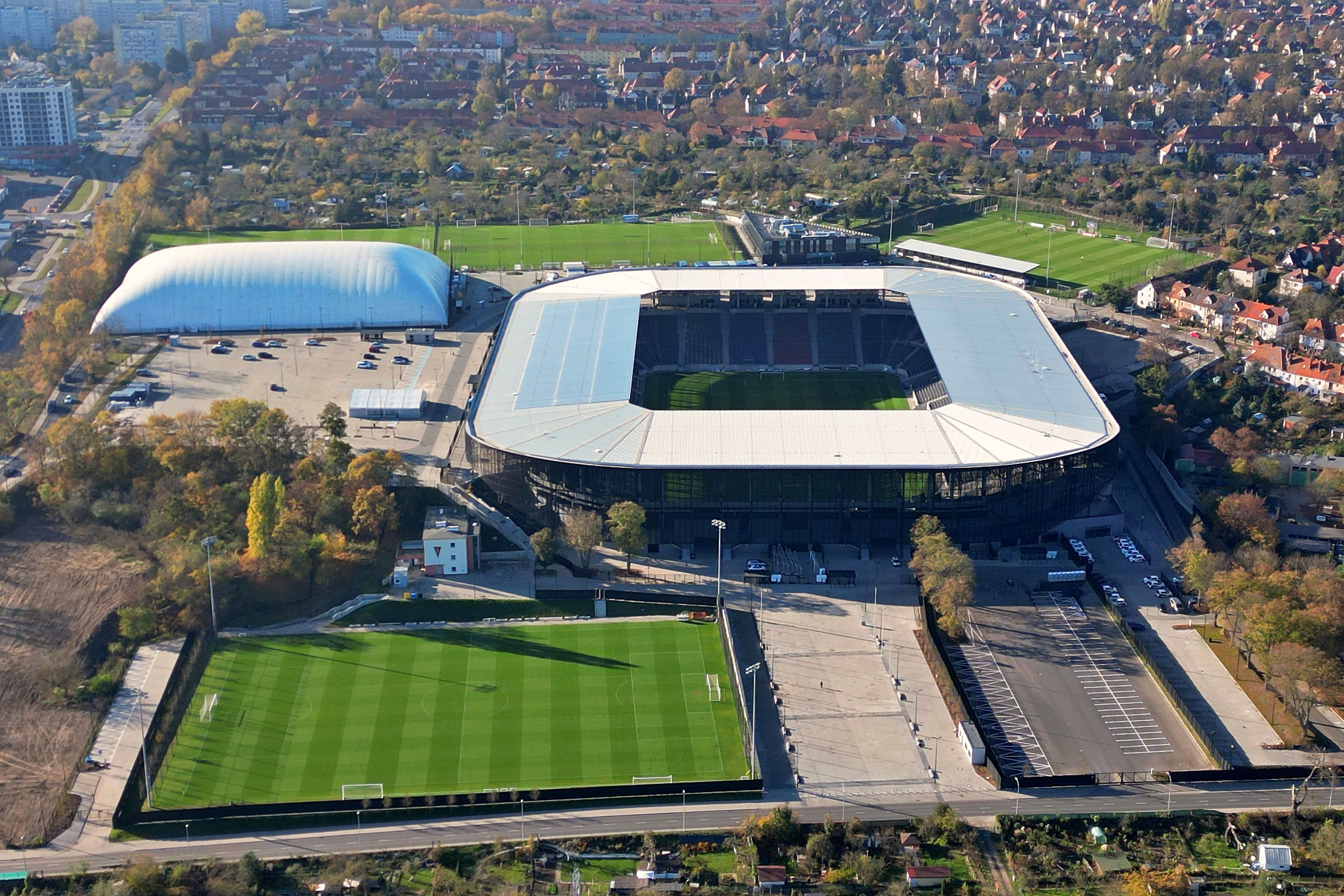
- Stadion Miejski renovations almost complete
- Interactive map of Florian Krygier Municipal Stadium
- Full name: Florian Krygier Stadium
- Location: ul. Karłowicza 28; 71-899 Szczecin, Poland
- Owner: City of Szczecin
- Capacity: 21,163
- Surface: Grass
- Field size: 105 × 68m

Construction
- Built: 1914–1925
- Opened: October 5, 1925
- Renovated: 1949, 1955, 1995, 2002; 2019–2022 (new stadium)

Tenant
- Pogoń Szczecin (1948–)

The Florian Krygier Municipal Stadium (Stadion Miejski im. Floriana Krygiera) is a football stadium in Szczecin, Poland. It is the home ground of Pogoń Szczecin. The stadium was originally built in 1925 and last reconstructed in 2022. The stadium currently has the capacity of 21,163 people.

It is named in honour of Florian Krygier, Polish football coach and an instrumental figure in the history of Pogoń Szczecin.

A major reconstruction was initiated in 2019 and completed in 2022, reaching the capacity of 21,163.

== See also ==
- List of football stadiums in Poland
