= Aleksandar Kovačević =

Serbian footballer

Personal information
- Date of birth: 9 January 1992 (age 34)
- Place of birth: Belgrade, SFR Yugoslavia
- Height: 1.73 m (5 ft 8 in)
- Position: Defensive midfielder

Team information
- Current team: Spartak Subotica
- Number: 23

Youth career
- Red Star Belgrade

Senior career*
| Years | Team | Apps | (Gls) |
| 2008–2011 | Red Star Belgrade | 1 | (0) |
| 2009–2011 | → Sopot (loan) | 67 | (5) |
| 2012–2013 | Spartak Subotica | 40 | (1) |
| 2013–2015 | Red Star Belgrade | 47 | (0) |
| 2015–2017 | Lechia Gdańsk | 32 | (3) |
| 2017 | → Śląsk Wrocław (loan) | 16 | (1) |
| 2017–2018 | Haugesund | 9 | (0) |
| 2017–2018 | Haugesund II | 9 | (1) |
| 2018–2020 | Xanthi | 55 | (1) |
| 2020–2022 | Radnički Niš | 52 | (1) |
| 2022–2024 | Železničar Pančevo | 34 | (0) |
| 2024–2025 | Novi Pazar | 19 | (1) |
| 2025–2026 | Voždovac | 21 | (1) |
| 2026– | Spartak Subotica | 12 | (2) |

International career^{‡}
| 2010 | Serbia U18 | 8 | (0) |
| 2012 | Serbia U20 | 1 | (0) |
| 2013–2015 | Serbia U21 | 14 | (0) |
- * Club domestic league appearances and goals as of 4 October 2026 ‡ National team caps and goals as of 23 June 2015

Aleksandar Kovačević (Serbian Cyrillic: Александар Ковачевић; born 9 January 1992) is a Serbian professional footballer who plays as a defensive midfielder for Spartak Subotica.

== Honours ==
Red Star

- Serbian SuperLiga: 2013–14
