= Ariel Borysiuk =

Polish footballer (born 1991)

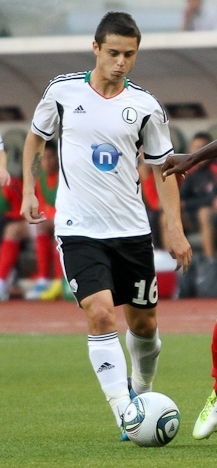
- Borysiuk with Legia Warsaw in 2011

Personal information
- Date of birth: 29 July 1991 (age 35)
- Place of birth: Biała Podlaska, Poland
- Height: 1.80 m (5 ft 11 in)
- Position: Defensive midfielder

Team information
- Current team: Orzeł Baniocha
- Number: 8

Youth career
- 2004–2007: TOP 54 Biała Podlaska

Senior career*
Years	Team	Apps	(Gls)
2007–2012	Legia Warsaw	90	(4)
2012–2015	1. FC Kaiserslautern	44	(0)
2013	1. FC Kaiserslautern II	5	(0)
2014	→ Volga (loan)	4	(0)
2014–2015	→ Lechia Gdańsk (loan)	34	(0)
2014	→ Lechia Gdańsk II (loan)	1	(0)
2015–2016	Lechia Gdańsk	20	(2)
2016	Legia Warsaw	13	(0)
2016–2018	Queens Park Rangers	11	(0)
2017	→ Lechia Gdańsk (loan)	14	(1)
2018–2019	Lechia Gdańsk	17	(0)
2018	Lechia Gdańsk II	5	(4)
2019	→ Wisła Płock (loan)	12	(2)
2019	Sheriff Tiraspol	10	(1)
2020–2021	Jagiellonia Białystok	28	(1)
2020	Jagiellonia Białystok II	1	(0)
2021–2022	Chennaiyin	14	(1)
2022–2023	KF Laçi	14	(1)
2023	Chojniczanka Chojnice	8	(0)
2024	Hutnik Warsaw	10	(0)
2025–	Orzeł Baniocha	38	(3)

International career
2007–2008	Poland U17	3	(0)
2009–2010	Poland U19	8	(1)
2010–2011	Poland U20	2	(0)
2009–2012	Poland U21	14	(1)
2010–2016	Poland	12	(0)
- * Club domestic league appearances and goals as of 16:07, 30 June 2026 (UTC)

Ariel Borysiuk ([ˈarʲɛl bɔˈrɨɕuk]; born 29 July 1991) is a Polish professional footballer who plays as a defensive midfielder for regional league club Orzeł Baniocha. He earned twelve caps with the Poland national team.

== Club career ==
=== Legia Warsaw ===
Born in Biała Podlaska, Borysiuk made his debut in Ekstraklasa on 23 February 2007 at the age of 16 years and 213 days, becoming the second youngest footballer ever to play for Legia. He is also Legia's youngest ever goalscorer, notching his first goal for the club at the age of 16 years and 265 days on 19 April 2008, in a 0–2 away win over Odra Wodzisław . This goal at the time made him the second youngest player to score a goal in Ekstraklasa with only Włodzimierz Lubański being younger when he scored.

=== 1. FC Kaiserslautern ===
On the last day of the 2011–12 winter transfer window, Borysiuk transferred to 1. FC Kaiserslautern. He was sent off on his debut for Kaiserslautern against 1. FC Köln for receiving two yellow cards, which came in the 35th and 40th minute. Kaiserslautern eventually lost the game 1–0.

==== Volga (loan) ====
On 19 January 2014, Boriysiuk joined Russian side Volga on loan for the remainder of the season. On 10 March 2014, Boriysiuk made his Volga debut in a 5–1 away defeat to Amkar Perm, in which he replaced Artur Sarkisov inside only twenty-three minutes. After only appearing four times for Volga, Boriysiuk returned to 1. FC Kaiserslautern at the end of the campaign.

=== Lechia Gdańsk ===
On 14 July 2014, it was announced that Borysiuk had joined Polish club Lechia Gdańsk on loan for the 2014–15 Ekstraklasa. On 19 July 2014, Borysiuk made his Lechia Gdańsk debut in a 2–2 draw against Jagiellonia Białystok, in which he played the full 90 minutes. Although, he failed to score once in his loan spell at Lechia Gdańsk, Borysiuk managed to feature in every Ekstraklasa fixture for the 2014/15 campaign.

On 26 July 2015, after an impressive debut season at Lechia Gdańsk, Borysiuk made his stay permanent. On 28 August 2015, Borysiuk scored his first goal for Lechia Gdańsk in a 1–1 draw with Podbeskidzie.

=== Return to Legia Warsaw ===
On 11 January 2016, Borysiuk re-joined Legia Warsaw after an impressive spell at Lechia Gdańsk. On 21 February 2016, Borysiuk made his comeback for Legia Warsaw in a 2–1 victory over Zagłębie Lubin, in which he replaced Stojan Vranješ in the 32nd minute.

=== Queens Park Rangers ===
On 22 June 2016, after only featuring thirteen times for Legia Warsaw, it was announced that Borysiuk would join English side Queens Park Rangers on a three-year deal. After featuring in 10 league games, Borysiuk was allowed to go on loan in January 2017, returning to Poland to play for Lechia Gdańsk, who he been on loan with a few years earlier.

=== Return to Lechia Gdańsk ===
On 26 January 2018 Borysiuk moved to back to Lechia Gdańsk after his unsuccessful spell in English football. Initially after joining, Borysiuk was back in the Lechia team, playing 12 of the team's final 18 games of the season helping the team to avoid relegation. With the introduction of Piotr Stokowiec as the Lechia manager he found himself out of the starting eleven, and sometimes even seen as just a reserve. After the good start Lechia made in the 2018-19 season, they found themselves top of the league after 19 games and going into the winter break. During this time Borysiuk had only managed to make 5 appearances, playing an average of only 30 minutes in each of those games. Due to his lack of first team football Borysiuk moved to Wisła Płock on loan. While on loan for Wisła he played 12 games for the second half of the season scoring two goals. With Lechia winning the Polish Cup at the end of the season and finishing in a record equaling 3rd place Borysiuk knew that chances would be limited in the squad for him. The club agreed to a contract termination on 3 July 2019, meaning he was able to join his next club on a free transfer.

=== Sheriff Tiraspol ===
On 29 July 2019, Borysiuk signed for Sheriff Tiraspol.

=== Chennaiyin ===
On 10 August 2021, Borysiuk joined Indian Super League side Chennaiyin on a one-year deal.

=== KF Laçi ===
On 26 July 2022, he signed a two-year contract with Albanian Kategoria Superiore club KF Laçi.

=== Chojniczanka ===
On 17 June 2023, Borysiuk signed a one-year deal with an extension option with II liga club Chojniczanka Chojnice. After making nine appearances across all competitions, he left the club by mutual consent on 5 December that year.

=== Hutnik Warsaw and first retirement ===
On 16 January 2024, Borysiuk joined IV liga outfit Hutnik Warsaw. He left the club at the end of the season.

On 11 October 2024, he announced his retirement from professional football.

=== Orzeł Baniocha ===
On 8 March 2025, Borysiuk returned to football five months after announcing his retirement and joined seventh-tier club Orzeł Baniocha.

== International career ==
Before being capped for the senior team, Borysiuk also represented Poland at U21 level, having made his first appearance on 5 June 2009 against Sweden.

== Career statistics ==
=== Club ===
As of match played 4 June 2026

Appearances and goals by club, season and competition
Club	Season	League			National cup (Note: Includes Polish Cup, DFB-Pokal, FA Cup, Kosovar Cup)		Continental		Other		Total	
Club	Season	Division	Apps	Goals	Apps	Goals	Apps	Goals	Apps	Goals	Apps	Goals
Legia Warsaw	2007–08	Ekstraklasa	8	1	0	0	0	0	—		8	1
Legia Warsaw	2008–09	Ekstraklasa	18	0	0	0	2 (Note: Appearance(s) in UEFA Europa League)	0	0	0	20	0
Legia Warsaw	2009–10	Ekstraklasa	23	0	2	0	4	0	—		29	0
Legia Warsaw	2010–11	Ekstraklasa	26	2	6	0	—		—		32	2
Legia Warsaw	2011–12	Ekstraklasa	15	1	1	0	9	0	0	0	25	1
Legia Warsaw	Total		90	4	9	0	15	0	0	0	114	4
1. FC Kaiserslautern	2011–12	Bundesliga	12	0	0	0	—		—		12	0
1. FC Kaiserslautern	2012–13	2. Bundesliga	28	0	1	0	—		2 (Note: Appearance(s) in Promotion play-offs)	0	31	0
1. FC Kaiserslautern	2013–14	2. Bundesliga	4	0	0	0	—		—		4	0
1. FC Kaiserslautern	Total		44	0	1	0	—		2	0	47	0
1. FC Kaiserslautern II	2013–14	Regionalliga Bayern	5	0	—		—		—		5	0
Volga (loan)	2013–14	Russian Premier League	4	0	0	0	—		—		4	0
Lechia Gdańsk (loan)	2014–15	Ekstraklasa	34	0	1	0	—		—		35	0
Lechia Gdańsk	2015–16	Ekstraklasa	20	2	2	0	—		—		22	2
Legia Warsaw	2015–16	Ekstraklasa	13	0	2	0	0	0	—		15	0
Queens Park Rangers	2016–17	Championship	11	0	1	0	—		—		12	0
Lechia Gdańsk (loan)	2016–17	Ekstraklasa	14	1	—		—		—		14	1
Lechia Gdańsk	2017–18	Ekstraklasa	12	0	—		—		—		12	0
Lechia Gdańsk	2018–19	Ekstraklasa	5	0	—		—		—		5	0
Lechia Gdańsk	Total		17	0	—		—		—		17	0
Wisła Płock (loan)	2018–19	Ekstraklasa	12	2	—		—		—		12	2
Sheriff Tiraspol	2019	Moldovan National Division	10	1	—		2	0	—		12	1
Jagiellonia	2019–20	Ekstraklasa	13	1	—		—		—		13	1
Jagiellonia	2020–21	Ekstraklasa	15	0	0	0	—		—		15	0
Jagiellonia	Total		28	1	0	0	—		—		28	1
Chennaiyin	2021–22	Indian Super League	14	1	—		—		—		14	1
KF Laçi	2022–23	Kategoria Superiore	14	1	1	1	—		—		15	2
Chojniczanka Chojnice	2023–24	II liga	8	0	1	0	—		—		9	0
Hutnik Warsaw	2023–24	IV liga Masovia	10	0	—		—		—		10	0
Orzeł Baniocha	2024–25	Regional league Warsaw I	13	2	—		—		—		13	2
Orzeł Baniocha	2025–26	Regional league Warsaw II	25	1	—		—		—		25	1
Orzeł Baniocha	Total		38	3	—		—		—		38	3
Career total			386	16	18	1	17	0	2	0	423	19

=== International ===
Appearances and goals by national team and year
National team	Year	Apps	Goals
Poland
Poland	2010	2	0
Poland	2011	1	0
Poland	2012	5	0
Poland	2013	1	0
Poland	2015	2	0
Poland	2016	1	0
Total		12	0

== Honours ==
Legia Warsaw

- Ekstraklasa: 2015–16
- Polish Cup: 2007–08, 2010–11, 2011–12, 2015–16

Sheriff Tiraspol

- Moldovan National Division: 2019
