= Gerson (footballer, born 1992) =

Brazilian footballer

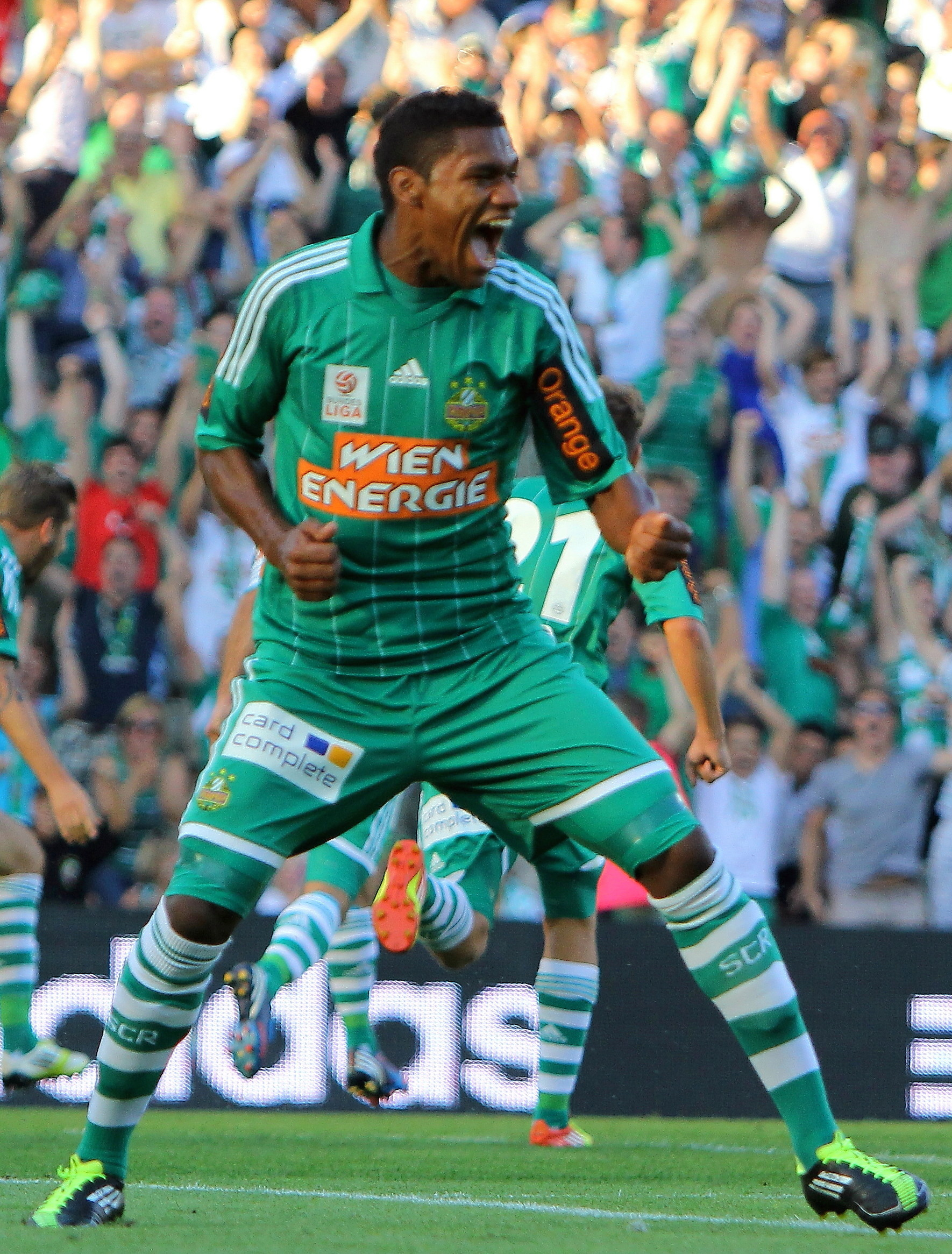
- Gerson during his spell at Rapid Wien

Personal information
- Full name: Gerson Guimarães Ferreira Júnior
- Date of birth: 7 January 1992 (age 34)
- Place of birth: Rio de Janeiro, Brazil
- Height: 1.86 m (6 ft 1 in)
- Position: Centre back

Youth career
- –2010: Botafogo
- 2011: → PSV Eindhoven (loan)

Senior career*
Years	Team	Apps	(Gls)
2010–2012	Botafogo	0	(0)
2011	→ Jong PSV (loan)		
2011	→ Atlético Madrid B (loan)	2	(0)
2012	→ Kapfenberger SV (loan)	15	(0)
2012–2015	Kapfenberger SV	0	(0)
2012–2013	→ Rapid Wien (loan)	26	(0)
2013–2014	→ Ferencváros (loan)	11	(0)
2014	→ Petrolul Ploiești (loan)	12	(0)
2015–2018	Lechia Gdańsk	35	(2)
2016–2017	→ Górnik Łęczna (loan)	24	(1)
2017	→ Gangwon FC (loan)	10	(1)
2019	CSA	9	(0)
2019	→ São Bento (loan)	11	(1)
2020	Liepāja	0	(0)
2021	Kagoshima United	1	(0)
2022	Górnik Łęczna	10	(0)
2023	Portuguesa (RJ)	4	(0)
2023–2024	Concordia Chiajna	9	(0)
- * Club domestic league appearances and goals as of 7 January 2025

Gerson Guimarães Ferreira Júnior (born 7 January 1992), commonly known as Gerson, is a Brazilian professional footballer who plays as a centre-back.

== Career ==
He started his professional career with Botafogo in 2010. In January 2011, he joined the youth team of Dutch giants PSV Eindhoven on loan. After a six-month stint with PSV youth, he signed a loan deal with Segunda División B side Atlético Madrid B in July. Gerson joined Austrian side Kapfenberg in 2012, being loaned first to Rapid Wien and then to Ferencváros. In January 2014, he was transferred to Petrolul Ploiești.

== Honours ==
Centro Sportivo Alagoano

- Campeonato Alagoano: 2019
