= Grzegorz Kuświk =

Polish footballer

Personal information
- Full name: Grzegorz Kuświk
- Date of birth: 23 May 1987 (age 39)
- Place of birth: Ostrów Wlkp., Poland
- Height: 1.81 m (5 ft 11 1/2 in)
- Position: Striker

Team information
- Current team: Ostrovia Ostrów Wielkopolski

Youth career
- Zawisza Sośnie

Senior career*
Years	Team	Apps	(Gls)
2004–2007	Gawin Królewska Wola		
2007–2012	GKS Bełchatów (ME)	39	(10)
2007–2012	GKS Bełchatów	43	(5)
2012	→ KS Polkowice (loan)	12	(7)
2012–2015	Ruch Chorzów	88	(28)
2015–2018	Lechia Gdańsk	79	(19)
2018–2019	Stal Mielec	11	(4)
2019–2020	Wisła Płock	31	(5)
2020–2021	Stomil Olsztyn	17	(1)
2021–2024	Zenit Międzybórz	47	(25)
2024–2025	LKS Ślesin	14	(3)
2025–	Ostrovia Ostrów Wielkopolski	0	(0)
- * Club domestic league appearances and goals as of 15 January 2025

Grzegorz Kuświk (born 23 May 1987) is a Polish professional footballer who plays as a striker for IV liga Greater Poland club Ostrovia Ostrów Wielkopolski.

== Club career ==
On 3 October 2020, he signed with Stomil Olsztyn. On 29 September 2021, he moved to a sixth-division side Zenit Międzybórz, where he also served as an assistant coach.

== Honours ==
Zenit Międzybórz

- Regional league Wrocław: 2022–23
