= 2019–20 Wisła Kraków season =

Wisła Kraków
2019–20 season
- Chairman: Piotr Obidziński
- Manager(s): Artur Skowronek (from 14 November 2019); Maciej Stolarczyk (until 14 November 2019)
- Ekstraklasa: 13th
- Polish Cup: First round
- Top goalscorer: League: Paweł Brożek (8 goals); All: Paweł Brożek (8 goals)
- Highest home attendance: 33,000 (29 September vs KS Cracovia, Ekstraklasa)
- Lowest home attendance: 10,076 (9 November vs Arka Gdynia, Ekstraklasa)
- Average home league attendance: 15,858
- Biggest win: Wisła Kraków 3–0 Jagiellonia Białystok (February 8, 2020)
- Biggest defeat: Legia Warsaw 7–0 Wisła Kraków (October 27, 2019)
Home colours	Away colours	Third colours

The 2019–20 Wisła Kraków season is the 80th season in the Ekstraklasa and the 66th season in the Polish Cup.

== Sponsors ==
Main Sponsor

(Poland) LV Bet

Kit manufacturer

(Germany) Adidas

Last updated: 24 May 2019.
Source: Wisła Kraków

== Transfers ==
=== Summer transfer window ===
==== Arrivals ====
- The following players moved to Wisła.

	Name	Position	Transfer type	Previous club	Fee	Ref.
	Transfer					
Substituted on	(Poland) David Niepsuj	Defender	20 May 2019	(Poland) Pogoń Szczecin	Free	
Substituted on	(Poland) Michał Mak	Midfielder	23 May 2019	(Poland) Lechia Gdańsk	Free	
Substituted on	(Poland) Rafał Janicki	Defender	24 May 2019	(Poland) Lechia Gdańsk	Free	
Substituted on	(Brazil) Jean Carlos	Midfielder	11 July 2019	(Spain) Club Recreativo Granada	Free	
Substituted on	(Spain) Chuca	Midfielder	31 July 2019	(Spain) Villarreal CF B	Free	
Substituted on	(Poland) Damian Pawłowski	Midfielder	27 August 2019	(Poland) Pogoń Szczecin	Free	
	Return from loan spell					
Substituted on	(Poland) Kacper Chorążka	Goalkeeper	10 June 2019	(Poland) Hutnik Kraków	Free	
Substituted on	(Poland) Piotr Świątko	Defender	10 June 2019	(Poland) Hutnik Kraków	Free	
Substituted on	(Ukraine) Denys Balanyuk	Forward	17 June 2019	(Ukraine) FC Arsenal Kyiv	Free	

==== Departures ====
- The following players moved from Wisła.

	Name	Position	Transfer type	New club	Fee	Ref.
	Transfer					
Substituted off	(Poland) Wojciech Słomka	Midfielder	5 June 2019	(Poland) Zagłębie Sosnowiec	Free	
Substituted off	(Poland) Maciej Śliwa	Midfielder	6 June 2019	(Poland) Miedź Legnica	Free	
Substituted off	(Croatia) Marko Kolar	Forward	17 June 2019	(Netherlands) FC Emmen	€500,000	
Substituted off	(Poland) Patryk Małecki	Midfielder	21 June 2019	(Poland) Zagłębie Sosnowiec	Free	
Substituted off	(Slovenia) Matej Palčič	Defender	24 June 2019	(Moldova) FC Sheriff Tiraspol	Free	
Substituted off	(Poland) Rafał Pietrzak	Defender	18 July 2019	(Belgium) Royal Excel Mouscron	Free	
Substituted off	(Poland) Tobiasz Weinzettel	Goalkeeper	21 August 2019	(Germany) 1. FC Bocholt	Free	
Substituted off	(Poland) Piotr Świątko	Defender	2 September 2019	(Poland) Miedź Legnica	Free	
	On loan					
Substituted off	(Poland) Artur Balicki	Forward	30 August 2019	(Poland) Pogoń Siedlce	Free	
Substituted off	(Poland) Patryk Plewka	Midfielder	2 September 2019	(Poland) Stal Rzeszów	Free	
Substituted off	(Poland) Daniel Morys	Midfielder	2 September 2019	(Poland) Olimpia Elbląg	Free	
	End of the loan					
Substituted off	(Poland) Sławomir Peszko	Midfielder	18 May 2019	(Poland) Lechia Gdańsk	Free	

=== Winter transfer window ===
==== Arrivals ====
- The following players moved to Wisła.

	Name	Position	Transfer type	Previous club	Fee	Ref.
	Transfer					
Substituted on	(Kazakhstan) Georgy Zhukov	Midfielder	1 January 2020	(Kazakhstan) FC Kairat	Free	
	On loan					
Substituted on	(Poland) Mateusz Hołownia	Defender	15 January 2020	(Poland) Śląsk Wrocław	Free	
Substituted on	(Slovakia) Ľubomír Tupta	Forward	15 January 2020	(Italy) Hellas Verona FC	Free	
Substituted on	(Brazil) Hebert	Defender	18 January 2020	(Japan) JEF United Chiba	Free	
Substituted on	(Serbia) Nikola Kuveljić	Midfielder	19 January 2020	(Serbia) FK Javor Ivanjica	Free	
Substituted on	(Israel) Alon Turgeman	Forward	4 February 2020	FK Austria Wien	Free	

==== Departures ====
- The following players moved to Wisła.

	Name	Position	Transfer type	New club	Fee	Ref.
	Transfer					
Substituted off	(Poland) Jakub Bartosz	Defender	28 January 2020	(Poland) Stal Mielec	Free	
Substituted off	(Ukraine) Denys Balanyuk	Forward	10 February 2020	(Ukraine) FC Olimpik Donetsk	Free	
	End of the loan					
Substituted off	(Ghana) Emmanuel Kumah	Midfielder	4 January 2020	(Poland) Wieczysta Kraków	Free	
	On loan					
Substituted off	(Poland) Marcin Grabowski	Defender	15 January 2020	(Poland) Bruk-Bet Termalica Nieciecza	Free	
Substituted off	(Poland) Przemysław Zdybowicz	Forward	23 January 2020	(Poland) GKS Bełchatów	Free	

== Coaching staff ==
Coach	(Poland) Maciej Stolarczyk (until 14 November 2019)
Coach	(Poland) Artur Skowronek (from 14 November 2019)
Second Coach	(Poland) Radosław Sobolewski (until 5 August 2019)
Assistant coach	(Poland) Mariusz Jop
Assistant coach	(Poland) Kazimierz Kmiecik
Assistant coach	(Poland) Dawid Szulczek (from 14 November 2019)
Goalkeeping coach	(Poland) Artur Łaciak (until 14 November 2019)
Goalkeeping coach	(Poland) Grzegorz Żmija (from 14 November 2019)
Trainer of Physical Preparation	(Poland) Wojciech Żuchowicz
Motor Fitness Trainer	(Poland) Daniel Michalczyk
Doctor	(Poland) Mariusz Urban
Masseur	(Poland) Zbigniew Woźniak
Physiotherapist	(Poland) Marcin Bisztyga
Team manager	(Poland) Jarosław Krzoska
Dietician	(Poland) Rafał Baran

Last updated: 26 November 2019.
Source: Wisła Kraków

== Competitions ==
=== Pre-season and friendlies ===
22 June 2019	Reprezentacja Powiatu Suskiego (Poland)	0−2	(Poland) Wisła Kraków	Zembrzyce, Poland
11:25 CEST (UTC+2)		Report	Boguski 13'; Kumah 74'; Buksa (penalty missed) 79'	Stadium: Stadion Garbarza; Attendance: 500; Referee: Mariusz Adamczyk (Wadowice)

26 June 2019	Radomiak Radom (Poland)	1−2	(Poland) Wisła Kraków	Warka, Poland
18:30 CEST (UTC+2)	Makowski 11'	Report	Drzazga 37'; Boguski 89'	Stadium: Hotel Sielanka nad Pilicą

29 June 2019	GKS Bełchatów (Poland)	2−1	(Poland) Wisła Kraków	Bełchatów, Poland
12:00 CEST (UTC+2)	Golański 19' (pen.), 31'	Report	Drzazga 90'; Balicki (red card) 90'	Stadium: GIEKSA Arena; Attendance: 600; Referee: Tomasz Wajda (Żywiec)

3 July 2019	Wisła Kraków (Poland)	0−1	(Poland) Sandecja Nowy Sącz	Myślenice, Poland
16:00 CEST (UTC+2)		Report	Korzym 64'	Stadium: Sport Myślenice; Referee: Sebastian Krasny (Kraków)

6 July 2019	Podbeskidzie Bielsko-Biała (Poland)	0−1	(Poland) Wisła Kraków	Dankowice, Poland
12:00 CEST (UTC+2)		Report	Klemenz 58'	Stadium: Stadion Pasjonata; Referee: Tomasz Wajda (Żywiec)

13 July 2019	Wisła Kraków (Poland)	4−2	(Poland) Puszcza Niepołomice	Myślenice, Poland
11:00 CEST (UTC+2)	Brożek 16', 21' (pen.), 53'; Plewka 57'	Report	Embaló 15'; Stefanik 60' (pen.)	Stadium: Sport Myślenice; Attendance: 0

13 July 2019	Wisła Kraków (Poland)	3−1	(Poland) Puszcza Niepołomice	Myślenice, Poland
16:00 CEST (UTC+2)	Buksa 5' (pen.), 39'; Morys 49'	Report	Żytek 17'; Uwakwe (red card) 36'	Stadium: Sport Myślenice

7 September 2019	Polonia Przemyśl (Poland)	1−8	(Poland) Wisła Kraków	Przemyśl, Poland
12:00 CEST (UTC+2)	Kazek 27' (pen.)	Report	Chuca 11', 14'; Boguski 21'; Wojtkowski 31', 35'; Drzazga 43' (pen.), (penalty missed) 45'; Brożek 59' (pen.), 61'	Stadium: Stadion Polonii; Referee: Marcin Kogut (Jarosław)

11 October 2019	Wisła Kraków (Poland)	8−0	(Poland) Wisła Kraków Olboys	Kraków, Poland
19:40 CEST (UTC+2)	Chuca 11', 47'; Drzazga 25', 30'; Zdybowicz 33', 40'; Mak 41'; Szot 60'	Report		Stadium: Stadion Miejski; Referee: Tomasz Musiał (Kraków)

16 November 2019	Radziszowianka Radziszów (Poland)	0−3	(Poland) Wisła Kraków	Radziszów, Poland
11:00 CET (UTC+1)		Report	Brożek 5'; Jean Carlos 13'; Drzazga 75'	Stadium: Stadion Radziszowianki; Referee: Sebastian Krasny (Kraków)

18 January 2020	Wisła Kraków (Poland)	1−0	(Poland) Stal Mielec	Myślenice, Poland
12:00 CET (UTC+1)	Boguski 80'	Report		Stadium: Sport Myślenice; Referee: Sebastian Krasny (Kraków)

22 January 2020	FK Sileks (North Macedonia)	1−1	(Poland) Wisła Kraków	Kadriye, Turkey
14:00 CET (UTC+1)	Ivanovski 40'	Report	Chuca 10'	Stadium: IC Hotels Football Center

25 January 2020	FC Dinamo Batumi (Georgia (country))	1−1	(Poland) Wisła Kraków	Kadriye, Turkey
14:00 CET (UTC+1)	Flamarion 2'	Report	Hebert 70'	Stadium: IC Hotels Football Center

25 January 2020	FK Voždovac (Serbia)	0−1	(Poland) Wisła Kraków	Kadriye, Turkey
16:00 CET (UTC+1)		Report	Buksa 60'	Stadium: IC Hotels Football Center
Note: Match played 2 x 30 minutes

30 January 2020	FC Lokomotiv Moscow Youth (Russia)	0−3	(Poland) Wisła Kraków	Kadriye, Turkey
12:00 CET (UTC+1)		Report	Chuca 22'; Wasilewski 28'; Boguski 57'	Stadium: IC Hotels Football Center
Note: Match played 2 x 35 minutes

30 January 2020	FC Dinamo Tbilisi (Georgia (country))	2−3	(Poland) Wisła Kraków	Kadriye, Turkey
14:00 CET (UTC+1)	Kapanadze 65' (pen.); Mekvabishvili 85'	Report	Buksa 58'; Błaszczykowski 69' (pen.); Hebert 90'	Stadium: IC Hotels Football Center

19 February 2020	Wisła Kraków (Poland)	2−2	(Poland) Wigry Suwałki	Myślenice, Poland
11:00 CET (UTC+1)	Chuca 51'; Pawłowski 74'	Report	Bartczak 62'; Żebrakowski 89'	Stadium: Sport Myślenice

=== Ekstraklasa ===
==== League table ====
===== Regular season =====
Pos	Team	Pld	W	D	L	GF	GA	GD	Pts	Qualification
11	Zagłębie Lubin	30	10	8	12	49	46	+3	38 (Note: Head-to-head points: Zagłębie Lubin 4, Wisła Płock 1.)	Qualification for the Relegation round
12	Wisła Płock	30	10	8	12	37	50	−13	38	Qualification for the Relegation round
13	Wisła Kraków	30	10	5	15	37	47	−10	35	Qualification for the Relegation round
14	Korona Kielce	30	8	6	16	21	37	−16	30	Qualification for the Relegation round
15	Arka Gdynia	30	7	8	15	28	47	−19	29	Qualification for the Relegation round

Source: Ekstraklasa, 90minut
Rules for classification: 1) Points; 2) Head-to-head points; 3) Head-to-head goal difference; 4) Head-to-head goals scored; 5) Head-to-head away goals scored (only if two teams); 6) Goal difference; 7) Goals scored; 8) Fairplay ranking; 9) Draw. (Note: Head-to-head record is used only after all the matches between the teams in question have been played.)

===== Relegation round =====
Pos	Team	Pld	W	D	L	GF	GA	GD	Pts	Qualification
11	Zagłębie Lubin	37	15	8	14	61	53	+8	53 (Note: Points in regular season: Górnik Zabrze - 41 pts, Raków Częstochowa - 41 pts, Zagłębie Lubin - 38 pts. Head-to-head away goals in regular season: Górnik Zabrze 1, Raków Częstochowa 0.)	
12	Wisła Płock	37	14	9	14	45	54	−9	51	
13	Wisła Kraków	37	13	6	18	44	56	−12	45	
14	Arka Gdynia (R)	37	10	10	17	39	57	−18	40	Relegation to I liga
15	Korona Kielce (R)	37	9	8	20	29	48	−19	35	Relegation to I liga

Source: Ekstraklasa, 90minut
Rules for classification: 1) Points; 2) Points in regular season; 3) Head-to-head points in regular season; 4) Head-to-head goal difference in regular season; 5) Head-to-head goals scored in regular season; 5) Head-to-head away goals scored in regular season (if only two teams); 7) Goal difference; 8) Goals scored; 9) Fairplay ranking; 10) Play-off (only if needed to decide champion, teams for relegation or teams for UEFA competitions).
(R) Relegated

==== Results summary ====
===== Regular season =====
Overall								Home						Away					
Pld	W	D	L	GF	GA	GD	Pts	W	D	L	GF	GA	GD	W	D	L	GF	GA	GD
30	10	5	15	37	47	−10	35	7	2	6	23	16	+7	3	3	9	14	31	−17

Last updated: 14 June 2020.
Source: 90minut

===== Relegation round =====
Overall								Home						Away					
Pld	W	D	L	GF	GA	GD	Pts	W	D	L	GF	GA	GD	W	D	L	GF	GA	GD
7	3	1	3	7	9	−2	10	1	1	1	2	2	0	2	0	2	5	7	−2

Last updated: 18 July 2020.
Source: 90minut

==== Results by round ====
===== Regular season =====
Round	1	2	3	4	5	6	7	8	9	10	11	12	13	14	15	16	17	18	19	20	21	22	23	24	25	26	27	28	29	30
Ground	H	A	H	A	H	A	H	A	A	H	A	H	A	A	H	A	H	A	H	A	H	A	H	H	A	H	A	H	H	A
Result	L	D	W	L	W	L	W	D	L	L	L	L	L	L	L	L	L	L	W	W	W	W	W	D	W	D	L	L	W	D
Position	14	14	11	13	6	9	8	7	11	12	13	13	14	14	16	16	16	16	15	15	15	13	13	13	13	13	13	13	13	13

Updated to match(es) played on 14 June 2020. Source: 90minut
A = Away; H = Home; W = Win; D = Draw; L = Loss

===== Relegation Round =====
Round	1	2	3	4	5	6	7
Ground	A	H	A	A	H	A	H
Result	L	W	W	W	D	L	L
Position	13	13	13	13	13	13	13

Updated to match(es) played on 18 July 2020. Source: 90minut
A = Away; H = Home; W = Win; D = Draw; L = Loss

==== Regular season ====
20 July 2019 1	Wisła Kraków	0−1	Śląsk Wrocław	Kraków
17:30 CEST (UTC+2)	Boguski (yellow card) 31'	Report	Štiglec 62'; Celeban (yellow card) 75'; Chrapek (yellow card) 83'	Stadium: Stadion Miejski; Attendance: 14,613; Referee: Daniel Stefański (Bydgoszcz)

28 July 2019 2	Lechia Gdańsk	0−0	Wisła Kraków	Gdańsk
17:30 CEST (UTC+2)	Wolski (yellow card) 51'	Report	Sadlok (yellow card) 20'; Klemenz (yellow card) 80'; Wasilewski (yellow card) 90'	Stadium: Stadion Energa; Attendance: 13,270; Referee: Krzysztof Jakubik (Siedlce)

5 August 2019 3	Wisła Kraków	1−0	Górnik Zabrze	Kraków
18:00 CEST (UTC+2)	Janicki (yellow card) 16'; Klemenz (yellow card) 79'; Chuca 90+4'	Report	Bainović (yellow card) 45'; Bochniewicz (yellow card) 50'; Matras (yellow card) 74'; Jiménez (yellow card) 79'	Stadium: Stadion Miejski; Attendance: 15,007; Referee: Jarosław Przybył (Kluczbork)

10 August 2019 4	Pogoń Szczecin	1−0	Wisła Kraków	Szczecin
15:00 CEST (UTC+2)	Bartkowski (yellow card) 39'; Triantafyllopoulos 55'; Podstawski (yellow card) 75'	Report	Savićević (yellow card) 47'	Stadium: Stadion Miejski; Attendance: 3,947; Referee: Piotr Lasyk (Bytom)

16 August 2019 5	Wisła Kraków	4−0	ŁKS Łódź	Kraków
20:30 CEST (UTC+2)	Niepsuj (yellow card) 15', (goal) 44'; Brożek 23', 90+1'; Savićević 61'; Buksa (yellow card) 85'	Report		Stadium: Stadion Miejski; Attendance: 17,045; Referee: Szymon Marciniak (Płock)

23 August 2019 6	Jagiellonia Białystok	3−2	Wisła Kraków	Białystok
20:30 CEST (UTC+2)	Imaz 33', 38', 66'; Pospíšil (yellow card) 35'; Romanchuk (yellow card) 41'; Wójcicki (yellow card) 63'	Report	Janicki (yellow card) 26'; Brożek 44'; Niepsuj (yellow card) 57'; Sadlok (yellow card) 60'; Klemenz (yellow card) 87'; Buksa 90+1'	Stadium: Stadion Miejski; Attendance: 12,251; Referee: Tomasz Kwiatkowski (Warsaw)

31 August 2019 7	Wisła Kraków	4−2	Zagłębie Lubin	Kraków
20:00 CEST (UTC+2)	Mak 19'; Sadlok (yellow card) 21'; Brożek 23', 84'; Savićević (yellow card) 56'; Wojtkowski 58'; Błaszczykowski (yellow card) 62'	Report	Tosik (yellow card) 26'; Živec 27'; Balić 37', (yellow card) 39'	Stadium: Stadion Miejski; Attendance: 14,616; Referee: Daniel Stefański (Bydgoszcz)

14 September 2019 8	Korona Kielce	1−1	Wisła Kraków	Kielce
20:00 CEST (UTC+2)	Jukić (yellow card) 36'; Pacinda 47'; Gnjatić (yellow card) 59'; Gardawski (yellow card) 68'	Report	Niepsuj (yellow card) 14'; Boguski (red card) 31'; Brożek 38' (pen.); Wojtkowski (yellow card) 90+4'	Stadium: Kolporter Arena; Attendance: 7,073; Referee: Paweł Gil (Lublin)

22 September 2019 9	Wisła Płock	2−1	Wisła Kraków	Płock
12:30 CEST (UTC+2)	Furman 16'; Michalski 76'	Report	Wasilewski (yellow card) 22'; Brożek 29'; Mak (yellow card) 75'; Drzazga (yellow card) 90+2'	Stadium: Stadion im. Kazimierza Górskiego; Attendance: 4,317; Referee: Łukasz Szczech (Warsaw)

29 September 2019 10	Wisła Kraków	0−1	KS Cracovia	Kraków
17:30 CEST (UTC+2)	Sadlok (yellow card) 10'; Klemenz (yellow card) 43'; Savićević (yellow card) 90+3'	Report	Sipľak (yellow card) 43' van Amersfoort (yellow card) 51'; Hanca 73'	Stadium: Stadion Miejski; Attendance: 33,000; Referee: Piotr Lasyk (Bytom)

5 October 2019 11	Lech Poznań	4−0	Wisła Kraków	Poznań
17:30 CEST (UTC+2)	Jevtić 40'; Gytkjær (yellow card) 61', (goal) 76'; Jóźwiak 80'; Marchwiński 87'; Muhar (yellow card) 88'; Puchacz (yellow card) 90+8'	Report	Savićević (yellow card) 85'; Wojtkowski (yellow card) 90+7'	Stadium: INEA Stadion; Attendance: 15,089; Referee: Daniel Stefański (Bydgoszcz)

18 October 2019 12	Wisła Kraków	1−2	Piast Gliwice	Kraków
20:30 CEST (UTC+2)	Niepsuj 57', (yellow card) 36' (yellow-red card) 77'; Wasilewski (yellow card) 81'; Burliga (yellow card) 84'	Report	Parzyszek 25', 50'; Milewski (yellow card) 60'; Rymaniak (yellow card) 61'	Stadium: Stadion Miejski; Attendance: 13,685; Referee: Mariusz Złotek (Stalowa Wola)

27 October 2019 13	Legia Warsaw	7−0	Wisła Kraków	Warsaw
17:30 CET (UTC+1)	Luquinhas 2'; Kanté 18', 32', 53', (yellow card) 39', (penalty missed) 52'; Jędrzejczyk (yellow card) 55'; Novikovas 75'; Wszołek 80'; Niezgoda 90'	Report	Klemenz (yellow card) 45'	Stadium: Stadion Wojska Polskiego; Attendance: 18,670; Referee: Krzysztof Jakubik (Siedlce)

4 November 2019 14	Raków Częstochowa	1−0	Wisła Kraków	Bełchatów
20:30 CET (UTC+1)	Piątkowski (yellow card) 17'; Sapała (yellow card) 24'; Petrášek 83'; Schwarz (yellow card) 90+3'	Report	Niepsuj (yellow card) 29'; Wojtkowski (yellow card) 50'; Sadlok (yellow card) 90'	Stadium: GIEKSA Arena; Attendance: 2,574; Referee: Piotr Lasyk (Bytom)

9 November 2019 15	Wisła Kraków	0−1	Arka Gdynia	Kraków
20:00 CET (UTC+1)	Sadlok (yellow card) 17'; Klemenz (yellow card) 78'	Report	Vejinović (yellow card) 21'; Maghoma (yellow card) 42'; Jankowski 72'; Zbozień (yellow card) 81'; Bušuladžić (yellow card) 85'	Stadium: Stadion Miejski; Attendance: 10,076; Referee: Szymon Marciniak (Płock)

24 November 2019 16	Śląsk Wrocław	2−1	Wisła Kraków	Wrocław
17:30 CET (UTC+1)	Golla 45'; Mączyński (yellow card) 45+2', (goal) 77'	Report	Błaszczykowski 9' (pen.)	Stadium: Stadion Miejski; Attendance: 13,155; Referee: Daniel Stefański (Bydgoszcz)

1 December 2019 17	Wisła Kraków	0−1	Lechia Gdańsk	Kraków
17:30 CET (UTC+1)	Burliga (yellow card) 50'	Report	F. Paixão 31'; Peszko (yellow card) 33'; Nalepa (yellow card) 52'; Arak (yellow card) 82'; Haraslín (yellow card) 87'	Stadium: Stadion Miejski; Attendance: 10,089; Referee: Tomasz Kwiatkowski (Warsaw)

6 December 2019 18	Górnik Zabrze	4−2	Wisła Kraków	Zabrze
20:30 CET (UTC+1)	Kopacz (yellow card) 37'; Sekulić (yellow card) 47'; Wolsztyński 56'; Jiménez 75', 90+1'; Matuszek (yellow card) 80'; Angulo 87' (pen.)	Report	Brożek 4'; Chuca (yellow card) 49', (goal) 58'; Mak (yellow card) 66'; Klemenz (yellow card) 71'	Stadium: Arena Zabrze; Attendance: 9,612; Referee: Bartosz Frankowski (Toruń)

13 December 2019 19	Wisła Kraków	1−0	Pogoń Szczecin	Kraków
20:30 CET (UTC+1)	Klemenz 38'; Buchalik (yellow card) 90+4'	Report	Podstawski (yellow card) 15'; Stec (yellow card) 64'; Kožulj (yellow card) 66'	Stadium: Stadion Miejski; Attendance: 10,523; Referee: Zbigniew Dobrynin (Łódź)

19 December 2019 20	ŁKS Łódź	2−4	Wisła Kraków	Łódź
18:00 CET (UTC+1)	Wolski (yellow card) 6'; Juraszek (red card) 10'; Sobociński (yellow card) 15'; Ramírez 33' (pen.), 90+2' (pen.), (yellow card) 81'; Guimaraes (yellow card) 75'; Rozwandowicz (yellow card) 83'	Report	Sadlok 14'; Chuca (yellow card) 35'; Błaszczykowski 43' (pen.); Rozwandowicz 45+1' (o.g.); Basha 78'; Pawłowski (yellow card) 82'; Wasilewski (yellow card) 90+1'	Stadium: Stadion Miejski; Attendance: 4,852; Referee: Paweł Raczkowski (Warsaw)

8 February 2020 21	Wisła Kraków	3−0	Jagiellonia Białystok	Kraków
20:00 CET (UTC+1)	Turgeman 28'; Wojtkowski 56'; Buksa 87'	Report		Stadium: Stadion Miejski; Attendance: 15,410; Referee: Jarosław Przybył (Kluczbork)

16 February 2020 22	Zagłębie Lubin	0−1	Wisła Kraków	Lubin
15:00 CET (UTC+1)		Report	Wojtkowski (yellow card) 57'; Savićević 65', (yellow card) 70'	Stadium: Stadion Zagłębia Lubin; Attendance: 4,349; Referee: Krzysztof Jakubik (Siedlce)

23 February 2020 23	Wisła Kraków	2−0	Korona Kielce	Kraków
15:00 CET (UTC+1)	Buksa 5'; Niepsuj (yellow card) 54'; Savićević (yellow card) 55'; Błaszczykowski 63'; Basha (yellow card) 68'	Report	Radin (yellow card) 30'; Żubrowski (yellow card) 41'; Spychała (yellow card) 62' (yellow-red card) 85'; Kiełb (yellow card) 76'	Stadium: Stadion Miejski; Attendance: 17,354; Referee: Paweł Gil (Lublin)

29 February 2020 24	Wisła Kraków	2−2	Wisła Płock	Kraków
15:00 CET (UTC+1)	Tupta 10'; Zhukov (yellow card) 30'; Błaszczykowski 50' (pen.); Savićević (yellow card) 85'	Report	Furman 23'; Szwoch (yellow card) 36'; Rasak (yellow card) 38'; Sheridan (yellow card) 86'; García (yellow card) 90+5'; Uryga 90+6'	Stadium: Stadion Miejski; Attendance: 13,893; Referee: Łukasz Szczech (Warsaw)

3 March 2020 25	KS Cracovia	0−2	Wisła Kraków	Kraków
20:30 CET (UTC+1)	Sipľak (yellow card) 20'; Van Amersfoort (yellow card) 35'; Fiolić (yellow card) 46'; Jablonský (yellow card) 51'; Gol (yellow card) 62'; Hanca (yellow card) 90+8'	Report	Basha (yellow card) 34'; Błaszczykowski 53' (pen.); Zhukov (yellow card) 75'; Sadlok (yellow card) 83'; Hebert 90+3'	Stadium: Stadion Cracovii; Attendance: 14,154; Referee: Bartosz Frankowski (Toruń)

8 March 2020 26	Wisła Kraków	1−1	Lech Poznań	Kraków
15:00 CET (UTC+1)	Savićević 6'; Klemenz (yellow card) 37'; Basha (yellow card) 52'	Report	Gytkjær 39'; Ramírez (yellow card) 48'	Stadium: Stadion Miejski; Attendance: 21,281; Referee: Szymon Marciniak (Płock)

30 May 2020 27	Piast Gliwice	4−0	Wisła Kraków	Gliwice
17:30 CEST (UTC+2)	Félix 1', (yellow card) 23'; Parzyszek 11', 64'; Czerwiński (yellow card) 29'; Tuszyński 85'	Report	Błaszczykowski (yellow card) 3'; Sadlok (yellow card) 53' (yellow-red card) 75'; Burliga (yellow card) 66'; Savićević (yellow card) 73'; Wojtkowski (yellow card) 90+1'	Stadium: Stadion Miejski; Attendance: no spectators Referee: Paweł Raczkowski (Warsaw)
Note: Originally, the match was to be played on 14 March 2020 behind closed doors due to concerns over the coronavirus outbreak. On 13 March decided the PZPN to postpone indefinitely all games in Polish football.

7 June 2020 28	Wisła Kraków	1−3	Legia Warsaw	Kraków
17:30 CEST (UTC+2)	Burliga 29'; Zhukov (yellow card) 82'	Report	Jędrzejczyk (yellow card) 12'; Pekhart 57', 70', (yellow card) 83'; Gvilia 76'	Stadium: Stadion Miejski; Attendance: no spectators Referee: Jarosław Przybył (Kluczbork)
Note: Originally, the match was to be played on 22 March 2020 behind closed doors due to concerns over the coronavirus outbreak. On 13 March decided the PZPN to postpone indefinitely all games in Polish football.

10 June 2020 29	Wisła Kraków	3−2	Raków Częstochowa	Kraków
18:00 CEST (UTC+2)	Błaszczykowski 10' (pen.); Savićević (yellow card) 35', (goal) 88'; Basha (yellow card) 65'; Hołownia (yellow card) 66'; Klemenz (yellow card) 67'; Janicki 77'	Report	Forbes (yellow card) 11', (goal) 68' (pen.); Schwarz 59'; Tijanić (yellow card) 61'	Stadium: Stadion Miejski; Attendance: no spectators Referee: Mariusz Złotek (Stalowa Wola)
Note: The match was postponed on 20 March 2020 due to concerns over the coronavirus pandemic.

14 June 2020 30	Arka Gdynia	0−0	Wisła Kraków	Gdynia
18:00 CEST (UTC+2)	Jankowski (yellow card) 11'; Młyński (yellow card) 29'	Report	Janicki (yellow card) 54'; Kuveljić (yellow card) 60'	Stadium: Stadion GOSiR; Attendance: no spectators Referee: Krzysztof Jakubik (Siedlce)
Note: The match was postponed on 20 March 2020 due to concerns over the coronavirus pandemic.

==== Relegation round ====
20 June 2020 31	Raków Częstochowa	3−1	Wisła Kraków	Bełchatów
20:00 CEST (UTC+2)	Kun (yellow card) 15'; Kościelny 20'; Tijanić 55'; Sapała 78'; Oziębała (yellow card) 85'	Report	Kuveljić (yellow card) 25' (yellow-red card) 41'; Buksa 72'	Stadium: GIEKSA Arena; Attendance: 769; Referee: Tomasz Kwiatkowski (Warsaw)

23 June 2020 32	Wisła Kraków	1−0	Wisła Płock	Kraków
20:30 CEST (UTC+2)	Błaszczykowski 19' (pen.); Niepsuj (yellow card) 30'; Hebert (yellow card) 54'	Report	Marcjanik (yellow card) 18'	Stadium: Stadion Miejski; Attendance: 4,016; Referee: Bartosz Frankowski (Toruń)

27 June 2020 33	Górnik Zabrze	0−1	Wisła Kraków	Zabrze
20:00 CEST (UTC+2)	Giakoumakis (yellow card) 90+3'	Report	Turgeman 47'	Stadium: Arena Zabrze; Attendance: 4,268; Referee: Krzysztof Jakubik (Siedlce)

3 July 2020 34	ŁKS Łódź	1−2	Wisła Kraków	Łódź
18:00 CEST (UTC+2)	Pirulo 9'; Grzesik (yellow card) 37'; Arndt (yellow card) 57'; Corral (yellow card) 65'	Report	Klemenz (yellow card) 32'; Turgeman 45+2', 52' (pen.); Boguski (penalty missed) 64'; Kuveljić (yellow card) 73'; Niepsuj (yellow card) 86'; Sadlok (yellow card) 90+4'	Stadium: Stadion Miejski; Attendance: 928; Referee: Bartosz Frankowski (Toruń)

11 July 2020 35	Wisła Kraków	1−1	Korona Kielce	Kraków
20:00 CEST (UTC+2)	Turgeman 7', (penalty missed) 18'; Hołownia (red card) 30'; Janicki (yellow card) 49'; Wojtkowski (yellow card) 57'; Basha (yellow card) 63'; Klemenz (yellow card) 67'; Niepsuj (yellow card) 75'; Pawłowski (yellow card) 85'	Report	Szelągowski 34'; Cebula (yellow card) 56'; Długosz (yellow card) 83'	Stadium: Stadion Miejski; Attendance: 4,223; Referee: Wojciech Myć (Lublin)

14 July 2020 36	Zagłębie Lubin	3−1	Wisła Kraków	Lubin
20:30 CEST (UTC+2)	Starzyński 31'; Živec (yellow card) 34', (goal) 38'; Guldan (yellow card) 49'; Poręba 57'	Report	Turgeman 9'; Kuveljić (yellow card) 36'; Wojtkowski (yellow card) 50'	Stadium: Stadion Zagłębia Lubin; Attendance: 1,153; Referee: Paweł Gil (Lublin)

18 July 2020 37	Wisła Kraków	0−1	Arka Gdynia	Kraków
17:30 CEST (UTC+2)	Wasilewski (penalty missed) 67'; Boguski (yellow card) 88'	Report	Zawada 41'; Bergqvist (yellow card) 60'	Stadium: Stadion Miejski; Referee: Damian Sylwestrzak (Wrocław)

=== Polish Cup ===
25 September 2019 Round 1	Błękitni Stargard	2−1	Wisła Kraków	Stargard Szczeciński
16:00 CEST (UTC+2)	Fadecki 26' (pen.), 84' (pen.); Karmański (yellow card) 59'; Theus (yellow card) 75'	Report	Zdybowicz (yellow card) 35'; Mak 79'; Savićević (yellow card) 83'; Szota (yellow card) 83'; Wojtkowski (yellow card) 90'	Stadium: Stadion Miejski; Attendance: 1,700; Referee: Patryk Gryckiewicz (Toruń)

== Squad and statistics ==
=== Appearances, goals and discipline ===
As of Match played 18 July 2020

No.	Pos.	Name	Nat.	Ekstraklasa		Polish Cup		Total		Discipline	
No.	Pos.	Name	Nat.	Apps	Goals	Apps	Goals	Apps	Goals	Yellow card	Red card
1	GK	Mateusz Lis	(Poland)	6	0	1	0	7	0	0	0
22	GK	Michał Buchalik	(Poland)	31	0	0	0	31	0	1	0
2	DF	Rafał Janicki	(Poland)	33+1	1	1	0	35	1	4	0
4	DF	Maciej Sadlok	(Poland)	32+3	1	0	0	35	1	10	1
5	DF	Lukas Klemenz	(Poland)	33	1	0	0	33	1	11	0
8	DF	Łukasz Burliga	(Poland)	10+3	1	0	0	13	1	3	0
14	DF	Mateusz Hołownia	(Poland)	7+2	0	0	0	9	0	1	1
19	DF	David Niepsuj	(Poland)	20+2	2	0	0	22	2	10	1
27	DF	Marcin Wasilewski	(Poland)	7+8	0	0	0	15	0	4	0
43	DF	Dawid Szot	(Poland)	2+3	0	0	0	5	0	0	0
45	DF	Daniel Hoyo-Kowalski	(Poland)	1	0	0	0	1	0	0	0
91	DF	Herbert	(Brazil)	9+1	1	0	0	10	1	1	0
7	MF	Michał Mak	(Poland)	19+2	1	0+1	1	22	2	2	0
9	MF	Rafał Boguski	(Poland)	19+7	0	1	0	27	0	2	1
10	MF	Vullnet Basha	(Albania)	26+1	1	1	0	28	1	5	0
16	MF	Jakub Błaszczykowski	(Poland)	19+3	7	0	0	22	7	2	0
18	MF	Chuca	(Spain)	12+13	2	0	0	25	2	2	0
20	MF	Georgy Zhukov	(Kazakhstan)	11+2	0	0	0	13	0	3	0
21	MF	Nikola Kuveljić	(Serbia)	7+4	0	0	0	11	0	5	1
26	MF	Kamil Wojtkowski	(Poland)	20+2	2	0+1	0	23	2	8	0
28	MF	Vukan Savićević	(Montenegro)	20+2	4	0+1	0	23	4	10	0
99	MF	Damian Pawłowski	(Poland)	8+2	0	1	0	11	0	2	0
11	FW	Krzysztof Drzazga	(Poland)	4+8	0	1	0	13	0	1	0
15	FW	Jean Carlos	(Brazil)	11+6	0	0+1	0	18	0	0	0
17	FW	Alon Turgeman	(Israel)	8+1	6	0	0	9	6	0	0
23	FW	Paweł Brożek	(Poland)	17+2	8	0	0	19	8	0	0
29	FW	Ľubomír Tupta	(Slovakia)	7+3	1	0	0	10	1	0	0
44	FW	Aleksander Buksa	(Poland)	3+18	4	0	0	21	4	1	0
Players transferred loaned out during the season
3	DF	Serafin Szota	(Poland)	0	0	1	0	1	0	1	0
17	DF	Jakub Bartosz	(Poland)	0+1	0	0	0	1	0	0	0
21	DF	Marcin Grabowski	(Poland)	1+1	0	1	0	3	0	0	0
42	MF	Daniel Morys	(Poland)	0+1	0	0	0	1	0	0	0
59	FW	Przemysław Zdybowicz	(Poland)	2+6	0	0+1	0	9	0	1	0
71	FW	Denys Balanyuk	(Ukraine)	1+1	0	0	0	2	0	0	0
77	MF	Emmanuel Kumah	(Ghana)	0+1	0	1	0	2	0	0	0

=== Goalscorers ===
As of Match played 18 July 2020

Rank	Pos.	No.	Player	Ekstraklasa	Polish Cup	Total
1	FW	23	(Poland) Paweł Brożek	8	0	8
2	MF	16	(Poland) Jakub Błaszczykowski	7	0	7
3	FW	17	(Israel) Alon Turgeman	6	0	6
4	MF	28	(Montenegro) Vukan Savićević	4	0	4
4	FW	44	(Poland) Aleksander Buksa	4	0	4
6	MF	7	(Poland) Michał Mak	1	1	2
6	MF	18	(Spain) Chuca	2	0	2
6	DF	19	(Poland) David Niepsuj	2	0	2
6	MF	26	(Poland) Kamil Wojtkowski	2	0	2
10	DF	2	(Poland) Rafał Janicki	1	0	1
10	DF	4	(Poland) Maciej Sadlok	1	0	1
10	DF	5	(Poland) Lukas Klemenz	1	0	1
10	MF	8	(Poland) Łukasz Burliga	1	0	1
10	MF	10	(Albania) Vullnet Basha	1	0	1
10	FW	29	(Slovakia) Ľubomír Tupta	1	0	1
10	DF	91	(Brazil) Herbert	1	0	1
10	DF	o.g.	(Poland) Maksymilian Rozwandowicz	1	0	1
TOTALS				44	1	45

=== Assists ===
As of Match played 18 July 2020

Rank	Pos.	No.	Player	Ekstraklasa	Polish Cup	Total
1	DF	4	(Poland) Maciej Sadlok	5	0	5
1	MF	16	(Poland) Jakub Błaszczykowski	5	0	5
3	MF	7	(Poland) Michał Mak	4	0	4
4	MF	28	(Montenegro) Vukan Savićević	3	0	3
5	DF	8	(Poland) Łukasz Burliga	2	0	2
5	MF	9	(Poland) Rafał Boguski	2	0	2
5	MF	18	(Spain) Chuca	2	0	2
5	FW	23	(Poland) Paweł Brożek	2	0	2
9	MF	15	(Brazil) Jean Carlos	1	0	1
9	DF	19	(Poland) David Niepsuj	1	0	1
TOTALS				26	0	26

=== Disciplinary record ===
As of Match played 18 July 2020

No.	Pos.	Name	Ekstraklasa		Polish Cup		Total	
No.	Pos.	Name	Yellow card	Red card	Yellow card	Red card	Yellow card	Red card
2	DF	(Poland) Rafał Janicki	4	0	0	0	4	0
3	DF	(Poland) Serafin Szota	0	0	1	0	1	0
4	DF	(Poland) Maciej Sadlok	10	1	0	0	10	1
5	DF	(Poland) Lukas Klemenz	11	0	0	0	11	0
7	MF	(Poland) Michał Mak	2	0	0	0	2	0
8	DF	(Poland) Łukasz Burliga	3	0	0	0	3	0
9	MF	(Poland) Rafał Boguski	2	1	0	0	2	1
10	MF	(Albania) Vullnet Basha	5	0	0	0	5	0
11	FW	(Poland) Krzysztof Drzazga	1	0	0	0	1	0
14	DF	(Poland) Mateusz Hołownia	1	1	0	0	1	1
16	MF	(Poland) Jakub Błaszczykowski	2	0	0	0	2	0
18	MF	(Spain) Chuca	2	0	0	0	2	0
19	DF	(Poland) David Niepsuj	10	1	0	0	10	1
20	MF	(Kazakhstan) Georgy Zhukov	3	0	0	0	3	0
21	MF	(Serbia) Nikola Kuveljić	5	1	0	0	5	1
22	GK	(Poland) Michał Buchalik	1	0	0	0	1	0
26	MF	(Poland) Kamil Wojtkowski	7	0	1	0	8	0
27	DF	(Poland) Marcin Wasilewski	4	0	0	0	4	0
28	MF	(Montenegro) Vukan Savićević	9	0	1	0	10	0
44	FW	(Poland) Aleksander Buksa	1	0	0	0	1	0
59	FW	(Poland) Przemysław Zdybowicz	0	0	1	0	1	0
91	DF	(Brazil) Herbert	1	0	0	0	1	0
99	MF	(Poland) Damian Pawłowski	2	0	0	0	2	0
