= 2020–21 Wisła Kraków season =

Wisła Kraków 2020–21 football season

Wisła Kraków
2020–21 season
- Chairman: Dawid Błaszczykowski
- Manager(s): Artur Skowronek (until 28 November 2020); Kazimierz Kmiecik & Grzegorz Mokry (interim, until 2 December 2020); Peter Hyballa (until 14 May 2021); Kazimierz Kmiecik & Mariusz Jop (interim, from 14 May 2021)
- Ekstraklasa: 13th
- Polish Cup: First round
- Top goalscorer: League: Felicio Brown Forbes (7); All: Felicio Brown Forbes (7)
Home colours	Away colours	Third colours

The 2020–21 Wisła Kraków season was the 81st season in the Ekstraklasa and the 67th season in the Polish Cup.

== Sponsors ==
Main Sponsor

(Poland) LV Bet

Kit manufacturer

(Italy) Macron

Last updated: 11 August 2020.
Source: Wisła Kraków

== Transfers ==
=== Summer transfer window ===
==== Arrivals ====
- The following players moved to Wisła.

	Name	Position	Transfer type	Previous club	Fee	Ref.
	Transfer					
Substituted on	(Serbia) Nikola Kuveljić	Midfielder	28 May 2020	(Serbia) FK Javor Ivanjica	€200,000	
Substituted on	(Poland) Tafara Madembo	Forward	2 July 2020	(Poland) FCB Escola Varsovia	Free	
Substituted on	(Montenegro) Fatos Bećiraj	Forward	24 July 2020	(Israel) Maccabi Netanya	Free	
Substituted on	(Bosnia and Herzegovina) Adi Mehremić	Defender	5 August 2020	(Portugal) CD Aves	Free	
Substituted on	(Austria) Stefan Savić	Midfielder	6 August 2020	(Slovenia) NK Olimpija Ljubljana	Free	
Substituted on	(Ghana) Yaw Yeboah	Midfielder	11 August 2020	(Spain) Celta de Vigo B	Free	
Substituted on	(Poland) Dawid Abramowicz	Defender	14 August 2020	(Poland) Radomiak Radom	€15,000	
Substituted on	(Czech Republic) Michal Frydrych	Defender	16 September 2020	(Czech Republic) SK Slavia Prague	€800,000	
Substituted on	(Costa Rica) Felicio Brown Forbes	Forward	5 October 2020	(Poland) Raków Częstochowa	€100,000	
	Return from loan spell					
Substituted on	(Poland) Patryk Plewka	Midfielder	7 August 2020	(Poland) Stal Rzeszów	Free	

==== Departures ====
- The following players moved from Wisła.

	Name	Position	Transfer type	New club	Fee	Ref.
	Transfer					
Substituted off	(Poland) Paweł Brożek	Forward	18 July 2020	End of Career	-	
Substituted off	(Poland) Marcin Wasilewski	Defender	18 July 2020	End of Career	-	
Substituted off	(Montenegro) Vukan Savićević	Midfielder	24 July 2020	(Turkey) Samsunspor	€350,000	
Substituted off	(Poland) Kamil Wojtkowski	Midfielder	30 July 2020	(Poland) Jagiellonia Białystok	Free	
Substituted off	(Poland) Krzysztof Drzazga	Forward	31 July 2020	(Poland) Miedź Legnica	Free	
	On loan					
Substituted off	(Poland) Damian Pawłowski	Midfielder	4 September 2020	(Poland) Stal Mielec	-	
	End of the loan					
Substituted off	(Brazil) Hebert	Defender	30 June 2020	(Japan) JEF United Chiba	Free	
Substituted off	(Poland) Mateusz Hołownia	Defender	31 July 2020	(Poland) Legia Warszawa	Free	
Substituted off	(Slovakia) Ľubomír Tupta	Forward	31 July 2020	(Italy) Hellas Verona FC	Free	
Substituted off	(Israel) Alon Turgeman	Forward	31 July 2020	FK Austria Wien	Free	

=== Winter transfer window ===
==== Arrivals ====
- The following players moved to Wisła.

	Name	Position	Transfer type	Previous club	Fee	Ref.
	Transfer					
Substituted on	(Luxembourg) Tim Hall	Defender	14 January 2021	(Portugal) Gil Vicente	Free	
Substituted on	(Ivory Coast) Souleymane Kone	Defender	26 January 2021	(Belgium) Westerlo	Free	
Substituted on	(Poland) Krystian Wachowiak	Defender	3 February 2021	(Poland) Chojniczanka Chojnice	€110,000	
Substituted on	(Ghana) David Mawutor	Midfielder	21 February 2021	(Kazakhstan) Zhetysu	Free	
	On loan					
Substituted on	(Slovenia) Žan Medved	Forward	23 January 2021	(Slovakia) Slovan Bratislava	Free	
Substituted on	(Serbia) Uroš Radaković	Defender	24 February 2021	(Czech Republic) Sparta Prague	Free	
	Return from loan spell					
Substituted on	(Poland) Przemysław Zdybowicz	Forward	31 December 2020	(Poland) GKS Bełchatów	Free	
Substituted on	(Poland) Serafin Szota	Defender	31 December 2020	(Poland) OKS Stomil Olsztyn	Free	

==== Departures ====
- The following players moved to Wisła.

	Name	Position	Transfer type	New club	Fee	Ref.
	Transfer					
Substituted off	(Poland) Rafał Janicki	Defender	14 December 2020	(Poland) Podbeskidzie Bielsko-Biała	Free	
Substituted off	(Poland) Lukas Klemenz	Defender	22 January 2021	(Hungary) Honvéd	€50,000	
Substituted off	(Luxembourg) Tim Hall	Defender	25 January 2021	Released	Free	
Substituted off	(Poland) Dawid Abramowicz	Defender	29 January 2021	(Poland) Radomiak Radom	?	
Substituted off	(Poland) David Niepsuj	Defender	5 February 2021	(Poland) Podbeskidzie Bielsko-Biała	Free	
Substituted off	(Poland) Michał Mak	Midfielder	10 February 2021	(Poland) Górnik Łęczna	Free	
	On loan					
Substituted off	(Poland) Przemysław Zdybowicz	Forward	1 February 2021	(Poland) Resovia	Free	
Substituted off	(Montenegro) Fatos Bećiraj	Forward	11 February 2021	(Israel) Bnei Yehuda Tel Aviv	Free	

== Coaching staff ==
Coach	(Germany) Peter Hyballa
Assistant coach	(Poland) Kazimierz Kmiecik
Analyst	(Germany) Maik Drzensla
Analyst	(Poland) Dominik Dyduła
Goalkeeping coach	(Poland) Maciej Kowal
Trainer of Physical Preparation	(Belgium) Robin Adriaenssen
Motor Fitness Trainer	(Poland) Daniel Michalczyk
Doctor	(Poland) Mariusz Urban
Physiotherapist	(Poland) Marcin Bisztyga
Physiotherapist	(Poland) Karol Biedrzycki
Physiotherapist	(Poland) Marcin Dudzik
Team manager	(Poland) Jarosław Krzoska
Kitman	(Poland) Jan Batko

Last updated: 14 January 2021.
Source: Wisła Kraków

== Competitions ==
=== Preseason and friendlies ===
5 August 2020	Wisła Kraków (Poland)	4–2	(Poland) Stal Mielec	Myślenice, Poland
12:00 CEST (UTC+2)	Jean Carlos 64', 80' (pen.), 83'; Boguski 66'	Report	Domański 19'; Seweryn 60'	Stadium: Sport Myślenice

8 August 2020	Podbeskidzie Bielsko-Biała (Poland)	0–1	(Poland) Wisła Kraków	Bielsko-Biała, Poland
13:15 CEST (UTC+2)		Report	Sadlok 33'	Stadium: Stadion Miejski; Attendance: 850; Referee: Sebastian Szczotka (Żywiec)
Note: The match lasted 120 minutes

5 September 2020	Stal Mielec (Poland)	0–2	(Poland) Wisła Kraków	Wola Chorzelowska, Poland
12:00 CEST (UTC+2)		Report	Basha 33' (pen.); Abramowicz 62'	Stadium: Hotel Rado Resort; Attendance: behind closed doors Referee: Marcin Szrek (Kielce)

13 January 2021	Wisła Kraków (Poland)	5–0	(Poland) NKP Podhale Nowy Targ	Myślenice, Poland
12:00 CET (UTC+1)	Jean Carlos 6'; Buksa 26'; Bećiraj 59'; Szywacz 75'; Abramowicz 77'	Report		Stadium: Sport Myślenice; Attendance: behind closed doors

16 January 2021	Wisła Kraków (Poland)	2–2	(Slovakia) MŠK Žilina	Kraków, Poland
13:00 CET (UTC+1)	Frydrych 37'; Kiwior 85' (pen.)	Report	Jibril 15'; Kurminowski 58'	Stadium: Stadion Miejski; Attendance: behind closed doors Referee: Sebastian Krasny (Kraków)

20 January 2021	Zagłębie Sosnowiec (Poland)	2–2	(Poland) Wisła Kraków	Sosnowiec, Poland
12:00 CET (UTC+1)	Mišák 71'; Gregório 80' (pen.)	Report	Yeboah 38'; Savić 56'	Stadium: Stadion Ludowy; Attendance: behind closed doors Referee: Daniel Kruczyński (Żywiec)

23 January 2021	Wisła Kraków (Poland)	cancelled	(Slovakia) Spartak Trnava	Kraków, Poland
13:00 CET (UTC+1)				Stadium: Stadion Miejski; Attendance: behind closed doors
Note: The game was cancelled following an outbreak of COVID-19 cases among the Spartak Trnava squad.

23 January 2021	Wisła Kraków (Poland)	2–1	(Poland) Bruk-Bet Termalica Nieciecza	Kraków, Poland
11:00 CET (UTC+1)	Buksa 45'; Boguski 85'	Report	Gergel 21'	Stadium: Stadion Miejski; Attendance: behind closed doors

=== Ekstraklasa ===
==== League table ====
Pos	Team	Pld	W	D	L	GF	GA	GD	Pts
11	Lech Poznań	30	9	10	11	39	38	+1	37 (Note: Head-to-head points: Jagiellonia Białystok 9, Górnik Zabrze 5, Lech Poznań 2.)
12	Wisła Płock	30	8	9	13	37	44	−7	33 (Note: Head-to-head matches: Wisła Kraków 0–3 Wisła Płock, Wisła Płock 1–3 Wisła Kraków.)
13	Wisła Kraków	30	8	9	13	39	42	−3	33
14	Cracovia (Note: Cracovia was deducted 5 points for match-fixing during the 2003–04 II liga season (second tier at the time).)	30	8	13	9	28	32	−4	32
15	Stal Mielec	30	6	11	13	31	47	−16	29

Source: ekstraklasa.org
Rules for classification: 1) Points; 2) Head-to-head points; 3) Head-to-head goal difference; 4) Head-to-head goals scored; 5) Head-to-head away goals scored (only if between two teams); 6) Goal difference; 7) Goals scored; 8) Number of wins; 9) Number of away wins; 10) Fairplay ranking; 11) Draw

==== Results summary ====
Overall								Home						Away					
Pld	W	D	L	GF	GA	GD	Pts	W	D	L	GF	GA	GD	W	D	L	GF	GA	GD
30	8	9	13	39	43	−4	33	4	2	9	19	24	−5	4	7	4	20	19	+1

Last updated: 16 May 2021.
Source: 90minut

==== Results by round ====
Round	1	2	3	4	5	6	7	8	9	10	11	12	13	14	15	16	17	18	19	20	21	22	23	24	25	26	27	28	29	30
Ground	A	H	A	H	A	H	A	H	A	A	H	A	H	A	H	H	A	H	A	H	A	H	A	H	H	A	H	A	H	A
Result	D	L	D	L	D	L	W	W	D	L	L	D	L	W	L	W	D	W	W	D	L	W	L	L	L	L	D	D	L	W
Position	6	12	12	13	13	14	12	9	9	11	12	12	14	12	14	12	13	12	9	11	11	11	11	12	12	12	13	13	14	13

Updated to match(es) played on 8 May 2021. Source: 90minut
A = Away; H = Home; W = Win; D = Draw; L = Loss

==== Matches ====
24 August 2020 1	Jagiellonia Białystok	1–1	Wisła Kraków	Białystok
18:00 CEST (UTC+2)	Makuszewski 25'; Wdowik (yellow card) 35'; Bida (yellow card) 63'; Arsenić (yellow card) 76'	Report	Zhukov (yellow card) 12'; Błaszczykowski 33'; Basha (yellow card) 85'; Mehremić (yellow card) 88'	Stadium: Stadion Miejski; Attendance: 5,070; Referee: Tomasz Kwiatkowski (Warsaw)

29 August 2020 2	Wisła Kraków	1–3	Śląsk Wrocław	Kraków
17:30 CEST (UTC+2)	Szot (yellow card) 16'; Pawelec 40' (o.g.)	Report	Pich 17' (pen.), 75'; Puerto (yellow card) 67'; Celeban (yellow card) 82'; Sobota 85' (pen.)	Stadium: Stadion Miejski; Attendance: 5,044; Referee: Szymon Marciniak (Płock)

13 September 2020 3	Pogoń Szczecin	2–2	Wisła Kraków	Szczecin
15:00 CEST (UTC+2)	Klemenz 8' (o.g.); Smolinski (yellow card) 38'; Gorgon (yellow card) 78'; Triantafyllopoulos 90+4'	Report	Jean Carlos 3'; Sadlok (yellow card) 16'; Chuca 57'	Stadium: Stadion Miejski; Attendance: 1,877; Referee: Mariusz Złotek (Stalowa Wola)

18 September 2020 4	Wisła Kraków	0–3	Wisła Płock	Kraków
20:30 CEST (UTC+2)	Basha (yellow card) 75'; Szot (yellow card) 90'	Report	Uryga 8'; Michalski 43'; Rasak (yellow card) 65', (goal) 71'	Stadium: Stadion Miejski; Attendance: 7,007; Referee: Daniel Stefański (Bydgoszcz)

25 September 2020 5	Górnik Zabrze	0–0	Wisła Kraków	Zabrze
20:30 CEST (UTC+2)	Janža (yellow card) 32'; Manneh (yellow card) 33'	Report	Frydrych (yellow card) 12'; Mehremić (yellow card) 39'; Burliga (yellow card) 90+4'	Stadium: Arena Zabrze; Attendance: 12,492; Referee: Szymon Marciniak (Płock)

18 October 2020 7	Stal Mielec	0–6	Wisła Kraków	Mielec
15:00 CEST (UTC+2)	Flis (yellow card) 27'; Zjawiński (yellow card) 72'	Report	Frydrych 10'; Forbes 29'; Chuca 29'; Yeboah 47', 53'; Plewka 55'; Jean Carlos (yellow card) 67'	Stadium: Stadion MOSiR; Attendance: 0 Referee: Dominik Sulikowski (Gdańsk)

24 October 2020 8	Wisła Kraków	3–0	Podbeskidzie Bielsko-Biała	Kraków
15:00 CEST (UTC+2)	Jean Carlos 35' (pen.); Forbes (yellow card) 37'; Sadlok (yellow card) 56'; Chuca 61'; Frydrych (yellow card) 81'; Błaszczykowski 90+1'	Report	Sitek (yellow card) 32'; Kocsis (yellow card) 34'; Komor (red card) 72'	Stadium: Stadion Miejski; Attendance: 0 Referee: Paweł Gil (Lublin)

28 October 2020 6	Wisła Kraków	1–3	Lechia Gdańsk	Kraków
18:00 CET (UTC+1)	Szot (yellow card) 16'; Jean Carlos 30'; Chuca (yellow card) 61'; Sadlok (yellow card) 68'; Burliga (yellow card) 74'	Report	Kubicki (yellow card) 17'; Nalepa 35'; Sadlok 54' (o.g.); F. Paixão 69' (pen.)	Stadium: Stadion Miejski; Attendance: 0 Referee: Tomasz Kwiatkowski (Warsaw)
Note: The match, originally scheduled for 4 October, has been rescheduled for 28 October, after several players from Wisła Kraków testing positive for SARS-2 coronavirus.

6 November 2020 9	Raków Częstochowa	0–0	Wisła Kraków	Bełchatów
20:30 CET (UTC+1)		Report	Frydrych (yellow card) 16'; Abramowicz (yellow card) 69'	Stadium: GIEKSA Arena; Attendance: 0 Referee: Piotr Lasyk (Bytom)

21 November 2020 10	Warta Poznań	2–1	Wisła Kraków	Grodzisk Wielkopolski
20:00 CET (UTC+1)	Trałka (penalty missed) 27; Grzesik (yellow card) 30', (goal) 47'; Kuzimski 59'; Laskowski (yellow card) 63'	Report	Mehremić 9'; Savić (yellow card) 45+1'; Basha (yellow card) 85'	Stadium: Stadion Dyskobolii; Attendance: 0 Referee: Bartosz Frankowski (Toruń)

28 November 2020 11	Wisła Kraków	1–2	Zagłębie Lubin	Kraków
20:00 CET (UTC+1)	Burliga (yellow card) 48'; Forbes 55'; Yeboah (yellow card) 67'	Report	Bashkirov (yellow card) 40'; Šimić (yellow card) 55', (goal) 68'; Żubrowski (yellow card) 78'; Szysz (yellow card) 80'; Chodyna 86'	Stadium: Stadion Miejski; Attendance: 0 Referee: Sebastian Jarzębak (Bytom)

4 December 2020 12	KS Cracovia	1–1	Wisła Kraków	Kraków
20:30 CET (UTC+1)	Sipľak (yellow card) 61'; Hanca (yellow card) 71'; Van Amersfoort 85'; Márquez (yellow card) 90+4'	Report	Mehremić (yellow card) 33'; Szot (yellow card) 38'; Forbes (red card) 67', (goal) 61' (pen.); Lis (yellow card) 90+4'; Savić (yellow card) 90+10'; Zhukov (yellow card) 90+11'	Stadium: Stadion Cracovii; Attendance: 0 Referee: Daniel Stefański (Bydgoszcz)

12 December 2020 13	Wisła Kraków	1–2	Legia Warszawa	Kraków
20:00 CET (UTC+1)	Yeboah 12'; Mak (yellow card) 41'; Frydrych (yellow card) 74'; Chuca (yellow card) 79'; Sadlok (yellow card) 90'	Report	Martins (yellow card) 63'; Pekhart 81' (pen.), 89'	Stadium: Stadion Miejski; Attendance: 0 Referee: Jarosław Przybył (Kluczbork)

19 December 2020 14	Lech Poznań	0–1	Wisła Kraków	Poznań
20:00 CET (UTC+1)	Moder (yellow card) 71'	Report	Yeboah (yellow card) 40'; Błaszczykowski 67'	Stadium: INEA Stadium; Attendance: 0 Referee: Tomasz Kwiatkowski (Warsaw)

31 January 2021 15	Wisła Kraków	3–4	Piast Gliwice	Kraków
15:00 CET (UTC+1)	Burliga 5', (yellow card) 56'; Sadlok 12'; Forbes 20'; Zhukov (yellow card) 77'; Savić (yellow card) 81'; Mehremić (yellow card) 90+1'	Report	Świerczok 37', 90' (pen.), (yellow card) 90+1'; Steczyk 39'; Żyro (yellow card) 67'; Sokołowski (yellow card) 81'; Vida 90+4'	Stadium: Stadion Miejski; Attendance: 0 Referee: Krzysztof Jakubik (Siedlce)

7 February 2021 16	Wisła Kraków	2–0	Jagiellonia Białystok	Kraków
17:30 CET (UTC+1)	Szot (yellow card) 17'; Sadlok 55'; Forbes 88'	Report	Olszewski (yellow card) 39'; Matysik (yellow card) 90'	Stadium: Stadion Miejski; Attendance: 0 Referee: Jarosław Przybył (Kluczbork)

12 February 2021 17	Śląsk Wrocław	1–1	Wisła Kraków	Wrocław
20:30 CET (UTC+1)	Scalet 23'; Zylla (yellow card) 56' (yellow-red card) 64'; Štiglec (yellow card) 76'	Report	Yeboah 30'; Forbes (penalty missed) 57'; Frydrych (yellow card) 60'; Zhukov (yellow card) 75'	Stadium: Stadion Miejski; Attendance: 0 Referee: Bartosz Frankowski (Toruń)

19 February 2021 18	Wisła Kraków	2–1	Pogoń Szczecin	Kraków
20:30 CET (UTC+1)	Zech 31' (o.g.); Burliga (yellow card) 35'; Sadlok (yellow card) 38'; Medved (yellow card) 43'; Forbes 45+2'	Report	Gorgon (yellow card) 5', (goal) 48'; Zahovič (yellow card) 28'; Zech (yellow card) 64'; Bartkowski (yellow card) 65'; Matynia (yellow card) 85'	Stadium: Stadion Miejski; Attendance: 0 Referee: Paweł Raczkowski (Warsaw)

28 February 2021 19	Wisła Płock	1–3	Wisła Kraków	Płock
12:30 CET (UTC+1)	Rasak 67'; Lagator (yellow card) 84'	Report	Szota (yellow card) 49'; Frydrych (yellow card) 79'; Boguski 82', 90+7'; Radaković 85'	Stadium: Stadion im. Kazimierza Górskiego; Attendance: 0 Referee: Tomasz Kwiatkowski (Warsaw)

5 March 2021 20	Wisła Kraków	0–0	Górnik Zabrze	Kraków
20:30 CET (UTC+1)	Chuca (yellow card) 21'; Szota (yellow card) 44'; Forbes (yellow card) 90+4'	Report	Janža (yellow card) 90+4'	Stadium: Stadion Miejski; Attendance: 0 Referee: Mariusz Złotek (Stalowa Wola)

13 March 2021 21	Lechia Gdańsk	2–0	Wisła Kraków	Gdańsk
17:30 CET (UTC+1)	Pietrzak (yellow card) 16'; F. Paixão 64' (pen.); Udovičić 90+3'	Report	Jean Carlos (yellow card) 33'; Frydrych (yellow card) 48'; Mawutor (yellow card) 63'	Stadium: Stadion Energa; Attendance: 0 Referee: Jarosław Przybył (Kluczbork)

21 March 2021 22	Wisła Kraków	3–1	Stal Mielec	Kraków
15:00 CET (UTC+1)	Forbes (yellow card) 14', (goal) 75'; Radaković (yellow card) 43'; Mawutor (yellow card) 52'; Frydrych 88' (pen.); Lis (yellow card) 90'; Savić 90+4'	Report	De Amo (yellow card) 38'; Tomasiewicz 60'; Granlund (yellow card) 62'	Stadium: Stadion Miejski; Attendance: 0 Referee: Paweł Raczkowski (Warsaw)

5 April 2021 23	Podbeskidzie Bielsko-Biała	2–0	Wisła Kraków	Bielsko-Biała
15:00 CEST (UTC+2)	Ubbink 13'; Niepsuj 47'; Tulio (yellow card) 78'; Myakushko (yellow card) 82'; Danielak (yellow card) 90'	Report	Burliga (yellow card) 61'; Zhukov (yellow card) 63'	Stadium: Stadion Miejski; Attendance: 0 Referee: Daniel Stefański (Bydgoszcz)

9 April 2021 24	Wisła Kraków	1–2	Raków Częstochowa	Kraków
20:30 CEST (UTC+2)	Frydrych 38' (pen.), (yellow card) 79'; Burliga (yellow card) 60'; Zhukov (yellow card) 69'; Kuveljić (yellow card) 75'; Kone (yellow card) 90'	Report	Tijanić 33'; Jach (yellow card) 42'; Cebula 63'; Lederman (yellow card) 88'	Stadium: Stadion Miejski; Attendance: 0 Referee: Szymon Marciniak (Płock)

17 April 2021 25	Wisła Kraków	0–1	Warta Poznań	Kraków
20:00 CEST (UTC+2)	Szot (yellow card) 32'; Frydrych (yellow card) 67'	Report	Kupczak (yellow card) 16'; Kuzimski 88'; Ivanov (yellow card) 90+3'	Stadium: Stadion Miejski; Attendance: 0 Referee: Wojciech Myć (Lublin)

21 April 2021 26	Zagłębie Lubin	4–1	Wisła Kraków	Lubin
18:00 CEST (UTC+2)	Dražić (yellow card) 23'; Podliński 35'; Żubrowski (yellow card) 37'; Szysz 71'; Starzyński 74'; Mráz 87'	Report	Kuveljić (yellow card) 4'; Balić 16' (o.g.); Zhukov (yellow card) 73'; Forbes (yellow card) 78'; Buksa (yellow card) 90+2'	Stadium: Stadion Zagłębia; Attendance: 0 Referee: Łukasz Kuźma (Białystok)

24 April 2021 27	Wisła Kraków	0–0	KS Cracovia	Kraków
20:00 CEST (UTC+2)	Burliga (yellow card) 46'; Sadlok (yellow card) 66'; Kone (yellow card) 90+1'	Report	Thiago (yellow card) 45+2'; Hanca (penalty missed) 67'; Rocha (yellow card) 70'	Stadium: Stadion Miejski; Attendance: 0 Referee: Bartosz Frankowski (Toruń)

1 May 2021 28	Legia Warszawa	0–0	Wisła Kraków	Warsaw
15:00 CEST (UTC+2)	Hołownia (yellow card) 49'		Starzyński (yellow card) 9'; Burliga (yellow card) 43'; Gruszkowski (yellow card) 73'	Stadium: Stadion Wojska Polskiego; Attendance: 0 Referee: Szymon Marciniak (Płock)

8 May 2021 29	Wisła Kraków	1–2	Lech Poznań	Kraków
20:00 CEST (UTC+2)	Forbes (yellow card) 50'; Błaszczykowski 78'	Report	Czerwiński (yellow card) 9'; Ishak 12'; Kvekveskiri (yellow card) 45+1'; Tiba 61'; Karlström (yellow card) 80'; Milić (yellow card) 90+4'	Stadium: Stadion Miejski; Attendance: 0 Referee: Sebastian Jarzębak (Bytom)

16 May 2021 30	Piast Gliwice	2–3	Wisła Kraków	Gliwice
17:30 CEST (UTC+2)	Świerczok 17', (penalty missed) 28'; Steczyk (yellow card) 62'; Alves 83'	Report	Sokołowski 11' (o.g.); Savić 24'; Boguski (yellow card) 25'; Starzyński 43'; Forbes (yellow card) 71'; Kone (yellow card) 75'	Stadium: Stadion Miejski; Attendance: 0 Referee: Mariusz Złotek (Stalowa Wola)

=== Polish Cup ===
15 August 2020 Round 1	KSZO 1929 Ostrowiec Św.	2–1	Wisła Kraków	Ostrowiec Świętokrzyski
19:29 CEST (UTC+2)	Majewski (yellow card) 13', (goal) 70'; Zaklika (yellow card) 39'; Stanisławski 90+2'	Report	Chuca 55'; Hoyo-Kowalski (yellow card) 60'; Jean Carlos (yellow card) 66'	Stadium: Miejski Stadion Sportowy KSZO; Attendance: 3,100; Referee: Tomasz Wajda (Żywiec)

== Squad and statistics ==
=== Appearances, goals and discipline ===
As of match played 8 May 2021

No.	Pos.	Nat	Name	Total		Ekstraklasa		Polish Cup		Discipline	
No.	Pos.	Nat	Name	Apps	Goals	Apps	Goals	Apps	Goals	Yellow card	Red card
1	GK	(Poland) POL	Mateusz Lis	27	0	27	0	0	0	2	0
22	GK	(Poland) POL	Michał Buchalik	4	0	3	0	1	0	0	0
2	DF	(Poland) POL	Krystian Wachowiak	1	0	0+1	0	0	0	0	0
3	DF	(Bosnia and Herzegovina) BIH	Adi Mehremić	11	1	11	1	0	0	4	0
4	DF	(Poland) POL	Maciej Sadlok	26	2	24+1	2	1	0	6	0
5	DF	(Ivory Coast) CIV	Souleymane Kone	7	0	5+2	0	0	0	3	0
8	DF	(Poland) POL	Łukasz Burliga	23	1	18+4	1	1	0	9	0
14	DF	(Poland) POL	Daniel Hoyo-Kowalski	2	0	0+1	0	1	0	1	0
17	DF	(Poland) POL	Serafin Szota	8	0	3+5	0	0	0	2	0
20	DF	(Poland) POL	Konrad Gruszkowski	7	0	4+3	0	0	0	1	0
25	DF	(Czech Republic) CZE	Michal Frydrych	24	3	24	3	0	0	9	0
26	DF	(Serbia) SRB	Uroš Radaković	6	1	5+1	1	0	0	1	0
43	DF	(Poland) POL	Dawid Szot	20	0	15+5	0	0	0	6	0
6	MF	(Albania) ALB	Vullnet Basha	9	0	5+4	0	0	0	3	0
9	MF	(Poland) POL	Rafał Boguski	12	2	1+10	2	1	0	1	0
10	MF	(Kazakhstan) KAZ	Georgy Zhukov	26	0	21+4	0	1	0	7	0
16	MF	(Poland) POL	Jakub Błaszczykowski	16	4	3+13	4	0	0	0	0
18	MF	(Spain) ESP	Chuca	14	4	10+3	3	1	1	3	0
21	MF	(Serbia) SRB	Nikola Kuveljić	12	0	8+4	0	0	0	2	0
34	MF	(Ghana) GHA	David Mawutor	7	0	3+4	0	0	0	2	0
40	MF	(Ghana) GHA	Yaw Yeboah	28	4	26+2	4	0	0	2	0
54	MF	(Poland) POL	Piotr Starzyński	15	1	10+5	1	0	0	1	0
77	MF	(Austria) AUT	Stefan Savić	28	2	23+4	2	0+1	0	3	0
80	MF	(Poland) POL	Patryk Plewka	18	1	17	1	0+1	0	0	0
15	FW	(Brazil) BRA	Jean Carlos	23	3	18+4	3	1	0	3	0
44	FW	(Poland) POL	Aleksander Buksa	14	0	1+12	0	1	0	1	0
55	FW	(Slovenia) SLO	Žan Medved	13	0	5+8	0	0	0	1	0
99	FW	(Costa Rica) CRC	Felicio Brown Forbes	22	7	22	7	0	0	5	1
Players transferred or loaned out during the season
2	DF	(Poland) POL	Rafał Janicki	5	0	4	0	1	0	0	0
5	DF	(Poland) POL	Lukas Klemenz	4	0	3+1	0	0	0	0	0
7	MF	(Poland) POL	Michał Mak	5	0	1+3	0	1	0	1	0
11	FW	(Montenegro) MNE	Fatos Bećiraj	11	0	1+9	0	0+1	0	0	0
19	DF	(Poland) POL	David Niepsuj	2	0	1+1	0	0	0	0	0
33	DF	(Poland) POL	Dawid Abramowicz	12	0	8+4	0	0	0	1	0

=== Goalscorers ===
As of match played 16 May 2021

Rank	Pos.	Nat	No.	Player	Ekstraklasa	Polish Cup	Total
1	FW	(Costa Rica)	99	Felicio Brown Forbes	7	0	7
2	MF	(Poland)	16	Jakub Błaszczykowski	4	0	4
2	MF	(Spain)	18	Chuca	3	1	4
2	MF	(Ghana)	40	Yaw Yeboah	4	0	4
5	FW	(Brazil)	15	Jean Carlos	3	0	3
5	DF	(Czech Republic)	25	Michal Frydrych	3	0	3
7	DF	(Poland)	4	Maciej Sadlok	2	0	2
7	MF	(Poland)	9	Rafał Boguski	2	0	2
7	MF	(Austria)	77	Stefan Savić	2	0	2
10	DF	(Bosnia and Herzegovina)	3	Adi Mehremić	1	0	1
10	DF	(Poland)	8	Łukasz Burliga	1	0	1'
10	DF	(Serbia)	26	Uroš Radaković	1	0	1
10	MF	(Poland)	54	Piotr Starzyński	1	0	1
10	MF	(Poland)	80	Patryk Plewka	1	0	1
				Own goal	4	0	4
TOTALS					38	1	39

=== Assists ===
As of match played 8 May 2021

Rank	Pos.	Nat	No.	Player	Ekstraklasa	Polish Cup	Total
1	MF	(Kazakhstan)	10	Georgy Zhukov	4	0	4
2	DF	(Czech Republic)	25	Michal Frydrych	3	0	3
2	MF	(Austria)	77	Stefan Savić	3	0	3
4	DF	(Poland)	4	Maciej Sadlok	2	0	2
4	FW	(Brazil)	15	Jean Carlos	1	1	2
4	DF	(Poland)	33	Dawid Abramowicz	2	0	2
4	MF	(Ghana)	40	Yaw Yeboah	2	0	2
4	MF	(Poland)	80	Patryk Plewka	2	0	2
4	FW	(Costa Rica)	99	Felicio Brown Forbes	2	0	2
11	MF	(Spain)	18	Chuca	1	0	1
11	DF	(Poland)	43	Dawid Szot	1	0	1
11	FW	(Slovenia)	55	Žan Medved	1	0	1
TOTALS					23	1	24

=== Disciplinary record ===
No.	Pos.	Nat	Name	Ekstraklasa			Polish Cup			Total			Notes
No.	Pos.	Nat	Name	Yellow card	Second yellow card	Red card	Yellow card	Second yellow card	Red card	Yellow card	Second yellow card	Red card	Notes
1	GK	(Poland)	Mateusz Lis	2						2			
3	DF	(Bosnia and Herzegovina)	Adi Mehremić	4						4			
4	DF	(Poland)	Maciej Sadlok	6						6			
5	DF	(Ivory Coast)	Souleymane Kone	3						3			
6	MF	(Albania)	Vullnet Basha	3						3			
7	MF	(Poland)	Michał Mak	1						1			
8	DF	(Poland)	Łukasz Burliga	9						9			
9	MF	(Poland)	Rafał Boguski	1						1			
10	MF	(Kazakhstan)	Georgy Zhukov	7						7			
14	DF	(Poland)	Daniel Hoyo-Kowalski				1			1			
15	FW	(Brazil)	Jean Carlos	2			1			3			
17	DF	(Poland)	Serafin Szota	1						1			
18	MF	(Spain)	Chuca	2						2			
20	DF	(Poland)	Konrad Gruszkowski	1						1			
21	MF	(Serbia)	Nikola Kuveljić	2						2			
25	DF	(Czech Republic)	Michal Frydrych	9						9			
26	DF	(Serbia)	Uroš Radaković	1						1			
33	DF	(Poland)	Dawid Abramowicz	1						1			
34	MF	(Ghana)	David Mawutor	2						2			
40	MF	(Ghana)	Yaw Yeboah	2						2			
43	DF	(Poland)	Dawid Szot	6						6			
44	FW	(Poland)	Aleksander Buksa	1						1			
54	MF	(Poland)	Piotr Starzyński	1						1			
55	FW	(Slovenia)	Žan Medved	1						1			
77	MF	(Austria)	Stefan Savić	3						3			
99	FW	(Costa Rica)	Felicio Brown Forbes	6	1					6	1		

Last updated: 16 May 2021
Source: Competitive matches
Only competitive matches
(yellow card) = Number of bookings; (second yellow card) = Number of sending offs after a second yellow card; (red card) = Number of sending offs by a direct red card.
