= David Niepsuj =

German-born Polish footballer

Personal information
- Full name: David Niepsuj
- Date of birth: 16 August 1995 (age 31)
- Place of birth: Wuppertal, Germany
- Height: 1.83 m (6 ft 0 in)
- Position: Right-back

Team information
- Current team: Avia Świdnik
- Number: 42

Youth career
- TSV Fortuna Wuppertal
- Bayer Leverkusen
- –2012: Borussia Mönchengladbach
- 2012–2013: Fortuna Düsseldorf
- 2013–2014: Wuppertaler SV

Senior career*
Years	Team	Apps	(Gls)
2013–2014	Wuppertaler SV	2	(0)
2014–2015	VfL Bochum II	31	(4)
2015–2016	VfL Bochum	0	(0)
2016–2019	Pogoń Szczecin	40	(1)
2018–2019	Pogoń Szczecin II	10	(0)
2019–2021	Wisła Kraków	24	(2)
2021	Podbeskidzie	9	(1)
2022–2023	Chojniczanka Chojnice	28	(0)
2023–2025	Wisła Płock	41	(0)
2024	Wisła Płock II	3	(0)
2025	Stal Stalowa Wola	9	(0)
2026–	Avia Świdnik	12	(0)

International career
2015–2016	Poland U20	4	(0)
2015–2016	Poland U21	1	(0)
- * Club domestic league appearances and goals as of 22:31, 31 May 2026 (UTC)

David Niepsuj (born 16 August 1995) is a professional footballer who plays as a right-back for II liga club Avia Świdnik. Born in Germany, he represented Poland internationally at youth level.

== Career statistics ==
As of match played 23 May 2026

Appearances and goals by club, season and competition
Club	Season	League			National cup (Note: Includes Polish Cup)		Other		Total	
Club	Season	Division	Apps	Goals	Apps	Goals	Apps	Goals	Apps	Goals
Wuppertaler SV	2013–14	Oberliga Niederrhein	2	0	—		—		2	0
VfL Bochum II	2014–15	Regionalliga West	31	4	—		—		31	4
VfL Bochum	2015–16	2. Bundesliga	0	0	0	0	—		0	0
Pogoń Szczecin	2016–17	Ekstraklasa	12	0	1	0	—		13	0
Pogoń Szczecin	2017–18	Ekstraklasa	18	1	2	0	—		20	1
Pogoń Szczecin	2018–19	Ekstraklasa	10	0	0	0	—		10	0
Pogoń Szczecin	Total		40	1	3	0	—		43	1
Pogoń Szczecin II	2017–18	III liga, group II	2	0	—		—		2	0
Pogoń Szczecin II	2018–19	III liga, group II	8	0	—		—		8	0
Pogoń Szczecin II	Total		10	0	—		—		10	0
Wisła Kraków	2019–20	Ekstraklasa	22	2	0	0	—		22	2
Wisła Kraków	2020–21	Ekstraklasa	2	0	0	0	—		2	0
Wisła Kraków	Total		24	2	0	0	—		24	2
Podbeskidzie	2020–21	Ekstraklasa	9	1	—		—		9	1
Chojniczanka Chojnice	2021–22	II liga	9	0	—		—		9	0
Chojniczanka Chojnice	2022–23	I liga	19	0	0	0	—		19	0
Chojniczanka Chojnice	Total		28	0	0	0	—		28	0
Wisła Płock	2023–24	I liga	30	0	0	0	—		30	0
Wisła Płock	2024–25	I liga	11	0	0	0	—		11	0
Wisła Płock	Total		41	0	0	0	—		41	0
Wisła Płock II	2024–25	III liga, group I	3	0	—		—		11	0
Stal Stalowa Wola	2024–25	I liga	9	0	—		—		9	0
Avia Świdnik	2025–26	III liga, group IV	12	0	0	0	—		12	0
Career total			209	8	3	0	0	0	212	8

== Honours ==
Avia Świdnik

- III liga, group IV: 2025–26
- Polish Cup (Lublin regionals): 2025–26
- Polish Cup (Lublin subdistrict regionals): 2025–26
