= Michał Mak =

Polish footballer

Personal information
- Full name: Michał Mak
- Date of birth: 14 November 1991 (age 34)
- Place of birth: Sucha Beskidzka, Poland
- Height: 1.72 m (5 ft 7 1/2 in)
- Position: Winger

Youth career
- Babia Góra Sucha Beskidzka
- Wisła Kraków
- 2009: Stadion Śląski Chorzów

Senior career*
Years	Team	Apps	(Gls)
2010–2011	Ruch Radzionków	34	(3)
2012–2015	GKS Bełchatów	81	(19)
2015–2019	Lechia Gdańsk	47	(8)
2016	→ Arminia Bielefeld (loan)	1	(0)
2017–2018	→ Śląsk Wrocław (loan)	7	(1)
2019–2021	Wisła Kraków	25	(1)
2021–2022	Górnik Łęczna	42	(2)
2022–2024	Wieczysta Kraków	23	(7)
Total		260	(41)

International career
2011	Poland U21	1	(0)
- * Club domestic league appearances and goals

Michał Mak (born 14 November 1991) is a Polish former professional footballer who played as a winger.

== Career ==
On 31 August 2016, Mak was loaned to Arminia Bielefeld for the 2016–17 season in 2. Bundesliga.

== Career statistics ==
Appearances and goals by club, season and competition
Club	Season	League			National cup (Note: Includes Polish Cup)		Europe		Other		Total	
Club	Season	Division	Apps	Goals	Apps	Goals	Apps	Goals	Apps	Goals	Apps	Goals
Ruch Radzionków	2009–10	II liga West	1	0	0	0	—		—		1	0
Ruch Radzionków	2010–11	I liga	14	0	0	0	—		—		14	0
Ruch Radzionków	2011–12	I liga	19	3	1	0	—		—		20	3
Ruch Radzionków	Total		34	3	1	0	—		—		35	3
GKS Bełchatów	2011–12	Ekstraklasa	5	0	—		—		—		5	0
GKS Bełchatów	2012–13	Ekstraklasa	10	2	1	0	—		—		11	2
GKS Bełchatów	2013–14	I liga	32	15	1	0	—		—		33	15
GKS Bełchatów	2014–15	Ekstraklasa	34	2	3	2	—		—		37	4
GKS Bełchatów	Total		81	19	5	2	—		—		86	21
Lechia Gdańsk	2015–16	Ekstraklasa	23	6	2	1	—		—		25	7
Lechia Gdańsk	2016–17	Ekstraklasa	5	0	0	0	—		—		5	0
Lechia Gdańsk	2017–18	Ekstraklasa	0	0	0	0	—		—		0	0
Lechia Gdańsk	2018–19	Ekstraklasa	19	2	3	1	—		—		22	3
Lechia Gdańsk	Total		47	8	5	2	—		—		52	10
Arminia Bielefeld (loan)	2016–17	2. Bundesliga	1	0	0	0	—		—		1	0
Śląsk Wrocław (loan)	2017–18	Ekstraklasa	7	1	1	0	—		—		8	1
Wisła Kraków	2019–20	Ekstraklasa	21	1	1	1	—		—		22	2
Wisła Kraków	2020–21	Ekstraklasa	4	0	1	0	—		—		5	0
Wisła Kraków	Total		25	1	2	1	—		—		27	2
Górnik Łęczna	2020–21	I liga	16	1	1	0	—		2 (Note: Appearances in I liga promotion play-offs)	1	19	2
Górnik Łęczna	2021–22	Ekstraklasa	24	0	3	1	—		—		27	1
Górnik Łęczna	Total		40	1	4	1	—		2	1	46	3
Wieczysta Kraków	2022–23	III liga, gr. IV	12	4	1	0	—		—		13	4
Wieczysta Kraków	2023–24	III liga, gr. IV	11	3	0	0	—		—		11	3
Wieczysta Kraków	Total		23	7	1	0	—		—		24	7
Career totals			258	40	19	6	0	0	2	1	279	47

== Personal life ==
His twin brother, Mateusz Mak, was also a professional footballer. They played together for Ruch Radzionków and GKS Bełchatów.

== Honours ==
Ruch Radzionków

- II liga West: 2009–10

GKS Bełchatów

- I liga: 2013–14

Lechia Gdańsk

- Polish Cup: 2018–19

Wieczysta Kraków

- III liga, group IV: 2023–24
