= Rafał Janicki =

Polish footballer

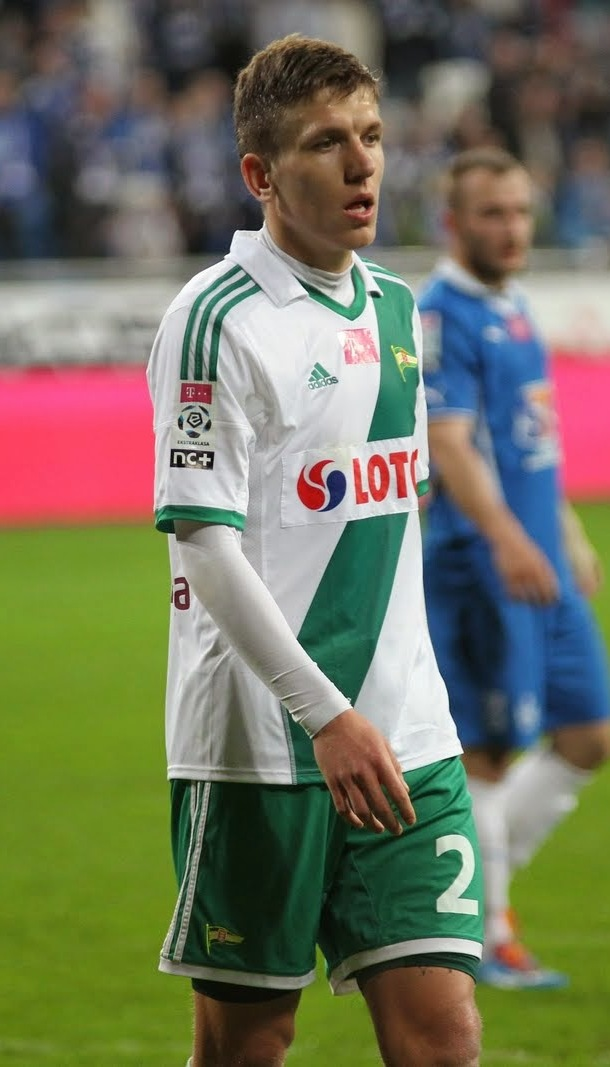
- Janicki with Lechia Gdańsk in 2014

Personal information
- Date of birth: 5 July 1992 (age 34)
- Place of birth: Szczecin, Poland
- Height: 1.91 m (6 ft 3 in)
- Position: Centre-back

Team information
- Current team: Górnik Zabrze
- Number: 26

Youth career
- 2008: Chemik Police

Senior career*
Years	Team	Apps	(Gls)
2009–2010	Chemik Police	38	(6)
2010–2014	Lechia Gdańsk II	14	(2)
2010–2019	Lechia Gdańsk	176	(4)
2017–2019	→ Lech Poznań (loan)	45	(0)
2017–2019	→ Lech Poznań II (loan)	4	(0)
2019–2020	Wisła Kraków	38	(1)
2021	Podbeskidzie	13	(3)
2021–	Górnik Zabrze	150	(10)

International career
2010–2011	Poland U19	8	(0)
2011	Poland U20	2	(0)
2013–2014	Poland U21	14	(1)
- * Club domestic league appearances and goals as of 18:49, 18 October 2026 (UTC)

Rafał Janicki (born 5 July 1992) is a Polish professional footballer who plays as a centre-back for Ekstraklasa club Górnik Zabrze.

== Club career ==
He is trainee of Chemik Police. In July 2010, he moved to Lechia Gdańsk on a three-year contract deal.

On 14 July 2017, he was loaned for two years to Ekstraklasa side Lech Poznań.

== International career ==
He was a part of Poland U19 national team. Janicki got his first call up to the Poland senior squad for friendlies against Georgia and Greece in June 2015.

Janicki was also a part of the under-20 squad in 2011 and later from 2013 to 2014 also the under-21 squad.

== Career statistics ==
As of match played 27 August 2026

Appearances and goals by club, season and competition
Club	Season	League			Polish Cup		Europe		Other		Total	
Club	Season	Division	Apps	Goals	Apps	Goals	Apps	Goals	Apps	Goals	Apps	Goals
Chemik Police	2008–09	II liga	8	0	0	0	—		—		8	0
Chemik Police	2009–10	III liga, gr. D	30	6	1	0	—		—		31	6
Chemik Police	Total		38	6	1	0	—		—		39	6
Lechia Gdańsk II	2010–11	III liga, gr. D	8	0	—		—		—		8	0
Lechia Gdańsk II	2011–12	III liga, gr. D	1	0	—		—		—		1	0
Lechia Gdańsk II	2012–13	III liga, gr. D	2	0	—		—		—		2	0
Lechia Gdańsk II	2013–14	III liga, gr. D	2	2	—		—		—		2	2
Lechia Gdańsk II	2014–15	III liga, gr. D	1	0	—		—		—		1	0
Lechia Gdańsk II	Total		13	2	—		—		—		13	2
Lechia Gdańsk	2010–11	Ekstraklasa	3	0	0	0	—		—		3	0
Lechia Gdańsk	2011–12	Ekstraklasa	25	0	0	0	—		—		25	0
Lechia Gdańsk	2012–13	Ekstraklasa	24	0	1	0	—		—		25	0
Lechia Gdańsk	2013–14	Ekstraklasa	27	1	3	0	—		—		30	1
Lechia Gdańsk	2014–15	Ekstraklasa	34	0	1	0	—		—		35	0
Lechia Gdańsk	2015–16	Ekstraklasa	35	2	2	0	—		—		37	2
Lechia Gdańsk	2016–17	Ekstraklasa	28	1	2	0	—		—		30	1
Lechia Gdańsk	Total		176	4	9	0	—		—		185	4
Lech Poznań (loan)	2017–18	Ekstraklasa	24	0	0	0	2 (Note: Appearances in UEFA Europa League)	0	—		26	0
Lech Poznań (loan)	2018–19	Ekstraklasa	21	0	1	0	5	0	—		27	0
Lech Poznań (loan)	Total		45	0	1	0	7	0	—		53	0
Lech Poznań II (loan)	2017–18	III liga, gr. II	1	0	—		—		—		1	0
Lech Poznań II (loan)	2018–19	III liga, gr. II	3	0	—		—		—		3	0
Lech Poznań II (loan)	Total		4	0	—		—		—		4	0
Wisła Kraków	2019–20	Ekstraklasa	34	1	1	0	—		—		35	0
Wisła Kraków	2020–21	Ekstraklasa	4	0	1	0	—		—		5	0
Wisła Kraków	Total		38	1	2	0	—		—		40	1
Podbeskidzie	2020–21	Ekstraklasa	13	3	—		—		—		13	3
Górnik Zabrze	2021–22	Ekstraklasa	33	2	2	0	—		—		35	2
Górnik Zabrze	2022–23	Ekstraklasa	16	0	1	1	—		—		17	1
Górnik Zabrze	2023–24	Ekstraklasa	32	2	1	0	—		—		33	2
Górnik Zabrze	2024–25	Ekstraklasa	27	0	0	0	—		—		27	0
Górnik Zabrze	2025–26	Ekstraklasa	31	3	6	1	—		—		37	4
Górnik Zabrze	2026–27	Ekstraklasa	3	0	0	0	6 (Note: Two appearances in UEFA Champions League, two appearances in UEFA Europa League, two appearances in UEFA Conference League)	0	1 (Note: Appearance in Polish Super Cup)	0	10	0
Górnik Zabrze	Total		142	7	10	2	6	0	1	0	159	9
Career total			469	23	23	2	13	0	1	0	506	25

== Honours ==
Lech Poznań II

- III liga, group II: 2018–19

Górnik Zabrze

- Polish Cup: 2025–26

Individual

- Polish Union of Footballers' Ekstraklasa Team of the Season: 2023–24
