= Jakub Błaszczykowski =

Polish footballer (born 1985)

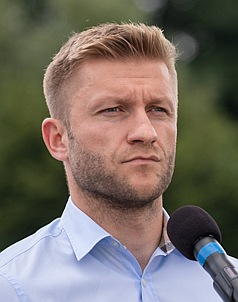
- Błaszczykowski in July 2019

Personal information
- Full name: Jakub Błaszczykowski
- Date of birth: 14 December 1985 (age 40)
- Place of birth: Truskolasy, Silesian Voivodeship, Polish People's Republic
- Height: 1.75 m (5 ft 9 in)
- Position: Winger

Youth career
- 1993–2002: Raków Częstochowa
- 2002–2003: Górnik Zabrze

Senior career*
Years	Team	Apps	(Gls)
2003–2004	KS Częstochowa	24	(11)
2004–2007	Wisła Kraków	51	(3)
2007–2016	Borussia Dortmund	197	(27)
2015–2016	→ Fiorentina (loan)	15	(2)
2016–2019	VfL Wolfsburg	38	(1)
2019–2023	Wisła Kraków	50	(16)
Total		375	(60)

International career
2004–2005	Poland U19	8	(0)
2005–2006	Poland U21	3	(1)
2005	Poland B	1	(0)
2006–2023	Poland	109	(21)
- * Club domestic league appearances and goals

Jakub "Kuba" Błaszczykowski (Polish pronunciation: [ˈjakup ˈkuba bwaʂt͡ʂɨˈkɔfskʲi]; born 14 December 1985) is a Polish businessman and former professional footballer who played as a winger. He is a part owner of Polish football club Wisła Kraków, where he began his professional career and established himself at a young age. In 2007, he joined Borussia Dortmund, where he spent the majority of his career, making over 250 appearances and winning two Bundesliga titles, two DFL-Supercups, and one DFB-Pokal.

Błaszczykowski was twice named Polish Footballer of the Year in 2008 and 2010. With 109 appearances, he is the second-most capped player of the Poland national team, and captained them as they co-hosted UEFA Euro 2012, while also appearing at UEFA Euro 2016 and the 2018 FIFA World Cup.

== Club career ==
=== Early career ===
Raised in Truskolasy near Częstochowa, Błaszczykowski began training at Raków Częstochowa when he was eight years old. In 2002, at age 16, he joined the youth side of Górnik Zabrze. In early 2003, he joined KS Częstochowa and played in the Polish fourth league until the end of 2004. His uncle, former Poland captain Jerzy Brzęczek, then helped him get a trial at Wisła Kraków, where he impressed then-manager Werner Lička.

Błaszczykowski quickly broke into Wisła's first team, with his first league appearance coming on 20 March 2005 against Polonia Warsaw. By the end of the season, he was an established part of the starting 11. With Wisła he won the Polish Ekstraklasa title in his debut season, and they were runners-up the following season. Additionally he won Canal+'s "Football Oscar" for the best midfielder in the Polish top division. He was also named to the Ekstraklasa Best XI of the 2006–07 season in the Polish Footballers' Association voting.

=== Borussia Dortmund ===
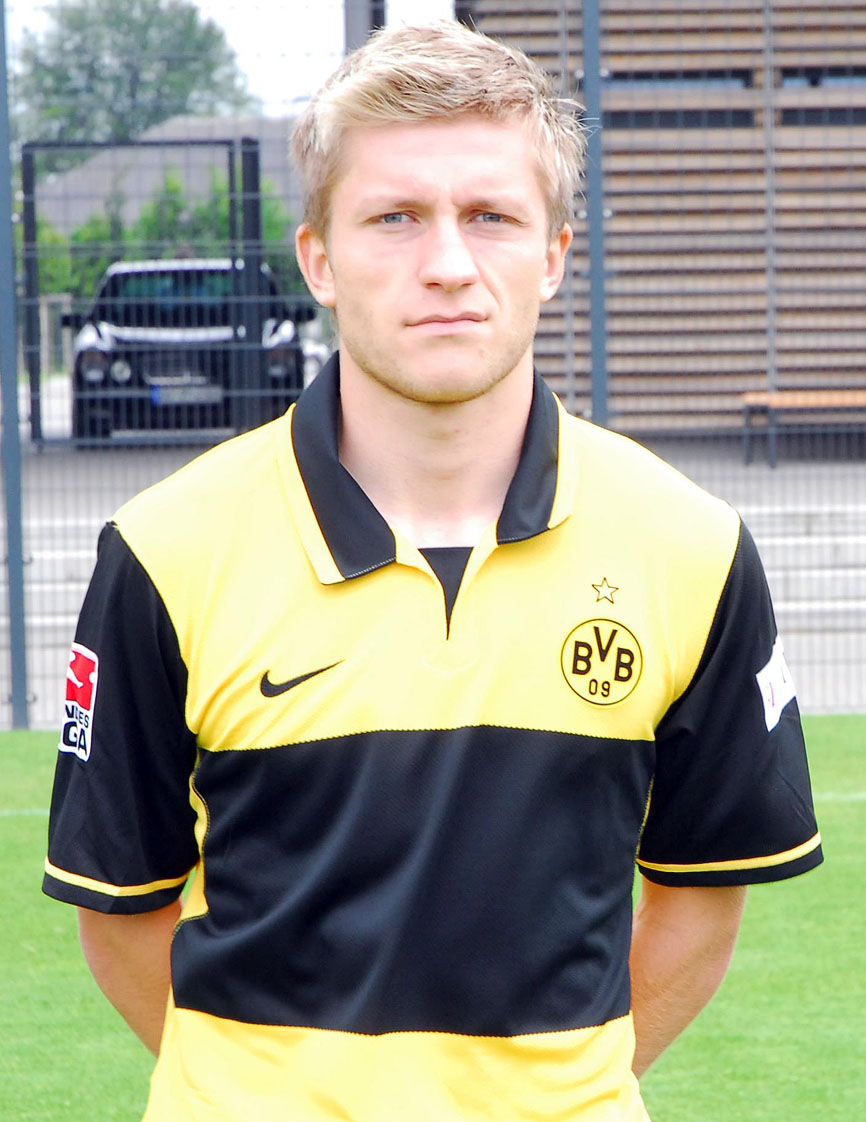
Błaszczykowski with Borussia Dortmund in 2007

In February 2007, Błaszczykowski signed a four-year contract with Borussia Dortmund for an undisclosed fee, joining the Bundesliga side in July of that year. He played with the shirt name "Kuba", a diminutive form of his first name, until 2012. During the 2008–09 season, he was plagued by a torn leg muscle. He was, nevertheless, voted Polish Footballer of the Year in December 2008.

Błaszczykowski with Borussia Dortmund won the Bundesliga title for two consecutive seasons in 2010–11 and 2011–12. He also won the 2011–12 DFB-Pokal, providing two assists in the final 5–2 victory over Bayern Munich. In July 2012, he was named on UEFA's 32-man shortlist for the Best Player in Europe award.

Błaszczykowski signed a new contract with Borussia Dortmund on 24 July 2012, keeping him with the German club until 2016. He scored his first goal of the 2012–13 season in the opening round of the DFB-Pokal on 18 August 2012, setting up Marco Reus for Dortmund's opening goal before netting their second, as the Yellow-Blacks achieved a 3–0 victory at FC Oberneuland. On 25 January 2013, Błaszczykowski scored two goals within the first 21 minutes against 1. FC Nürnberg, sending Dortmund on their way to a 3–0 victory and putting the defending champions within just nine points of league leaders Bayern. In Dortmund's 3–2 victory over Bayer 04 Leverkusen on 3 February, which moved Dortmund above Leverkusen into second place, he converted a penalty in the ninth minute to put his side up 2–0. He scored Dortmund's third goal in a 3–0 rout of Shakhtar Donetsk on 5 March, completing a 5–2 aggregate victory over the Ukrainian champions as Dortmund progressed to the quarter-finals of the Champions League. The result meant that the Yellow-Blacks had advanced to the quarter-finals for the first time in 15 years.

On 2 June 2013, Błaszczykowski signed a new contract with Borussia Dortmund, keeping him at the club until 2018. On 27 July 2013, Błaszczykowski won the 2013 DFL-Supercup with Dortmund 4–2 against rivals Bayern Munich. On 26 October 2013, Błaszczykowski scored a goal for Dortmund in the Revierderby against rivals Schalke in a 3–1 win for Dortmund.

=== Fiorentina (loan) ===
On 31 August 2015, Błaszczykowski joined Fiorentina for a season-long loan from Borussia Dortmund.

=== VfL Wolfsburg ===
On 1 August 2016, Błaszczykowski joined VfL Wolfsburg on a three-year contract for a reported fee of €5 million. In January 2019, his contract with Wolfsburg was dissolved.

=== Return to Wisła Kraków ===
On 7 February 2019, Błaszczykowski rejoined former club Wisła Kraków on a free transfer. In April 2020, he became part owner of the club. He missed most of the 2021–22 and 2022–23 campaigns after suffering a torn ACL in November 2021. On 20 July 2023, on the eve of the 2023–24 season, Błaszczykowski announced his retirement from professional football, at age 37.

== International career ==
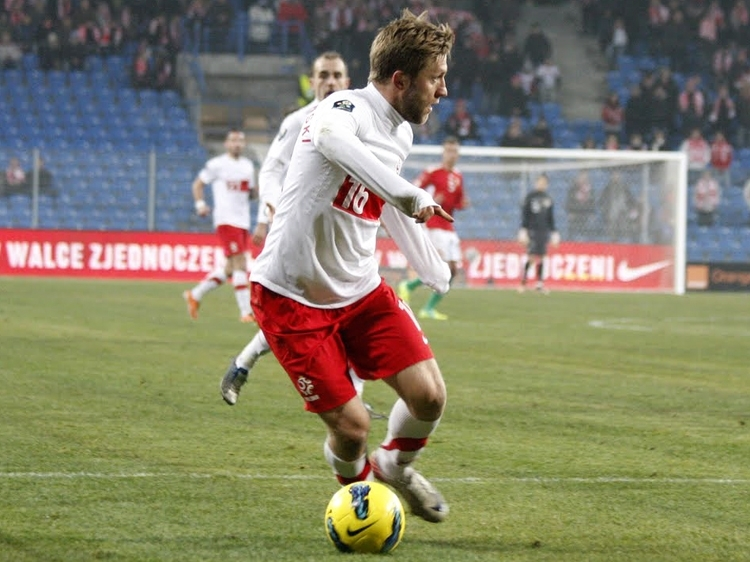
Błaszczykowski playing for Poland in 2011

Błaszczykowski debuted for the Poland national team on 28 March 2006 in a friendly match against Saudi Arabia. He was not selected for the 2006 FIFA World Cup due to injury. He scored his first goal for Poland on 22 August 2007 in a friendly against Russia. Błaszczykowski was an important part of Poland's successful UEFA Euro 2008 qualifying campaign and was named in Poland's squad for UEFA Euro 2008, but he withdrew due to injury. On 17 November 2010, in a friendly match against Ivory Coast, Błaszczykowski made his debut as captain of the Poland national team.

=== UEFA Euro 2012 ===
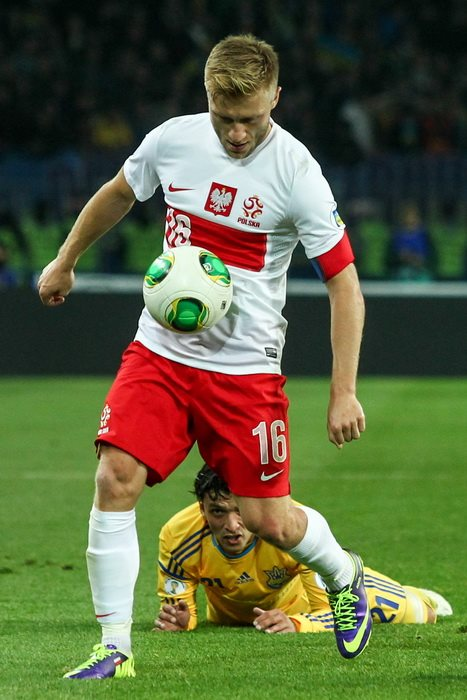
Błaszczykowski captaining Poland in 2013

On 8 June 2012, in the opening game of UEFA Euro 2012 against Greece, Błaszczykowski assisted Robert Lewandowski's goal in a 1–1 draw. In the second group stage match against Russia, he scored a long range equalising goal in a 1–1 draw and was named Man of the Match.

=== 2014 FIFA World Cup qualification ===
Błaszczykowski was Poland's current top scorer in their 2014 World Cup qualifying campaign with four goals. His first two strikes were from the penalty spot, his first gave Poland an early lead in their opening group game with Montenegro, a match which finished 2–2. His second goal came four days later, again giving Poland the lead in their 2–0 win over Moldova. He did not feature in the 1–1 draw with England due to injury. Błaszczykowski got the assist for Piszczek's goal in the 3–1 defeat to Ukraine. He did not feature against San Marino four days later due to an injury sustained in the pre-match warm up. On 7 June 2013, he scored his third goal of the qualifying campaign by grabbing the opener against Moldova – a game which finished 1–1. After San Marino scored an equaliser in a qualifying match on 10 September 2013, Błaszczykowski restored the lead just a minute later and Poland went on to win the match 5–1.

=== Euro 2016 ===
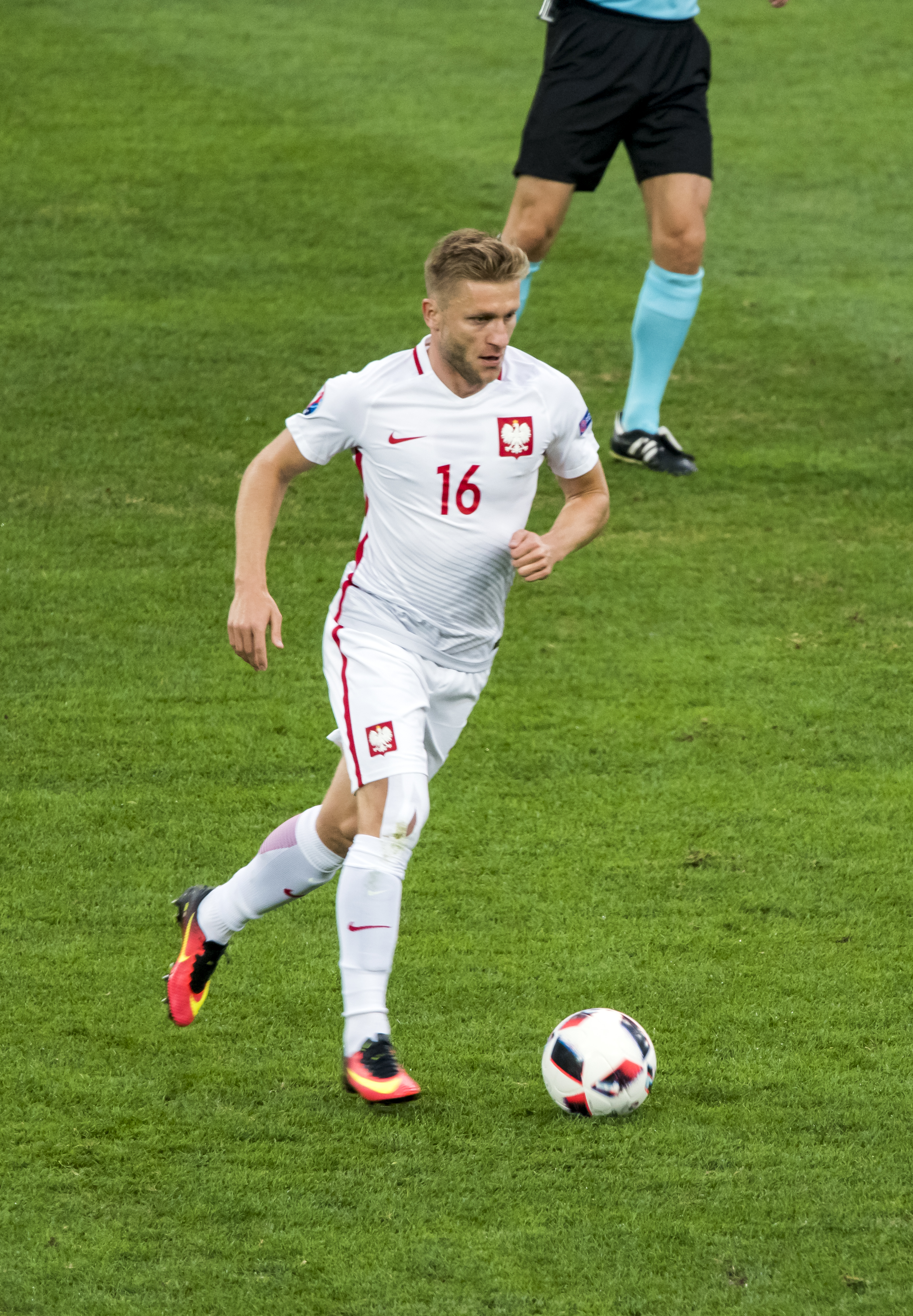
Błaszczykowski playing for Poland at the UEFA Euro 2016 in the quarter-final against Portugal

During nearly half of the qualifying campaign, Błaszczykowski was out of the national squad due to injury. He marked his return when coming on as a substitute in a qualifying match against Georgia, where the former Polish captain provided an assist against Georgia for the current captain, Robert Lewandowski, who scored a hat-trick in the final five minutes of the match in a 4–0 win. He scored a penalty against Gibraltar in an 8–1 victory and played in all the remaining games of qualification.

On 12 June, Poland's opening game, Błaszczykowski played a key role in providing a cross and assisting in Arkadiusz Milik's goal in a 1–0 win over Northern Ireland. This was Poland's first win at European Championship. Błaszczykowski also played in a goalless draw against Germany, but was dropped to the bench for the final group game against Ukraine. He came on as a substitute at halftime to score the only goal which sealed Poland the victory, earned them second spot in the group with seven points, behind Germany on goal difference. This marked their first advancement to the knockout stage at a European championship. On 25 June, the first game in the group of 16, Błaszczykowski scored the opening goal for Poland against Switzerland. The game ended 1–1, going into extra time and then a penalty shootout. Błaszczykowski delivered his spot kick and Poland won 5–4, advancing to the quarter final. The next knockout game against Portugal ended 1–1 after extra time, but Poland lost in the penalty shootout after he could not convert his penalty kick.

=== 2018 FIFA World Cup and beyond ===
Błaszczykowski was selected for the final 23-man Poland squad for the 2018 FIFA World Cup, but played only in the first game, a 2–1 defeat to Senegal in which he came off as a substitute at half-time.

Błaszczykowski scored on his record-breaking 103rd Poland cap, a 3–2 defeat to Portugal in the 2018–19 UEFA Nations League.

On 16 June 2023, almost four years after his last call-up in the team, Błaszczykowski was called up for a friendly match against Germany at National Stadium. He started his farewell game as a captain and left the pitch in the 16th minute to a guard of honor from both teams. Błaszczykowski retired the following month.

== Personal life ==
As a child, Błaszczykowski witnessed a family tragedy which had a major influence on his life. In September 1996, when he was 10 years old, his father, who abused alcohol, stabbed his mother to death. After his father went to prison, he and his older brother, Dawid, were raised by their grandmother. He briefly gave up football, but with the encouragement of his uncle, Jerzy Brzęczek, a former captain of the Poland national football team, he decided to resume training at Raków Częstochowa two months later. Błaszczykowski has credited his successes to his grandmother. He dedicates every goal he scores to his mother and can be seen looking up to the sky during goal celebrations.

On 7 September 2024, a special Borussia Dortmund legends farewell match was held in order to pay tribute to Błaszczykowski and his compatriot Łukasz Piszczek who helped shape some of the most successful years in the club's history between 2010 and 2015. The match was overseen by former club coach Jürgen Klopp and attracted over 81,000 spectators at the Signal Iduna Park. The match ended in a 5–4 victory of the Błaszczykowski team.

Błaszczykowski married Agata Gołaszewska in June 2010. Their daughter, Oliwia, was born in 2011. Their second daughter, Lena, was born in 2014.

He is a devout Catholic who reads the Bible on a daily basis, prays often, and participates in the Nie wstydzę się Jezusa (Polish for "I am not ashamed of Jesus") project.

In 2024, he was the subject of a documentary film entitled Kuba, which premiered on 23 February on Prime Video.

== Career statistics ==
=== Club ===
Appearances and goals by club, season and competition
Club	Season	League			National cup (Note: Includes Polish Cup, DFB-Pokal, Coppa Italia)		Continental		Other		Total	
Club	Season	Division	Apps	Goals	Apps	Goals	Apps	Goals	Apps	Goals	Apps	Goals
KS Częstochowa	2002–03	III liga	2	0	—		—		—		2	0
KS Częstochowa	2003–04	III liga	13	5	—		—		—		13	5
KS Częstochowa	2004–05	III liga	9	6	—		—		—		9	6
KS Częstochowa	Total		24	11	—		—		—		24	11
Wisła Kraków	2004–05	Ekstraklasa	11	1	4	1	—		—		15	2
Wisła Kraków	2005–06	Ekstraklasa	17	0	2	0	1 (Note: Appearance(s) in UEFA Champions League)	0	—		20	0
Wisła Kraków	2006–07	Ekstraklasa	23	2	0	0	8 (Note: Appearances in UEFA Cup)	0	1 (Note: Appearance in Ekstraklasa Cup)	1	32	3
Wisła Kraków	Total		51	3	6	1	9	0	1	1	67	5
Borussia Dortmund	2007–08	Bundesliga	24	1	3	0	—		—		27	1
Borussia Dortmund	2008–09	Bundesliga	27	3	0	0	2	0	—		29	3
Borussia Dortmund	2009–10	Bundesliga	32	1	2	0	—		—		34	1
Borussia Dortmund	2010–11	Bundesliga	29	3	1	0	7 (Note: Appearances in UEFA Europa League)	0	—		37	3
Borussia Dortmund	2011–12	Bundesliga	29	6	6	0	5	1	0	0	40	7
Borussia Dortmund	2012–13	Bundesliga	27	11	3	2	10	1	1 (Note: Appearance in DFL-Supercup)	0	41	14
Borussia Dortmund	2013–14	Bundesliga	16	2	2	0	6	1	1	0	25	3
Borussia Dortmund	2014–15	Bundesliga	13	0	4	0	3	0	0	0	20	0
Borussia Dortmund	Total		197	27	21	2	33	3	2	0	253	32
Fiorentina (loan)	2015–16	Serie A	15	2	0	0	5	0	—		20	2
VfL Wolfsburg	2016–17	Bundesliga	28	0	2	0	—		0	0	30	0
VfL Wolfsburg	2017–18	Bundesliga	9	1	2	0	—		2 (Note: Appearance(s) in Bundesliga relegation play-offs)	0	13	1
VfL Wolfsburg	2018–19	Bundesliga	1	0	1	0	—		—		2	0
VfL Wolfsburg	Total		38	1	5	0	—		2	0	45	1
Wisła Kraków	2018–19	Ekstraklasa	8	5	—		—		—		8	5
Wisła Kraków	2019–20	Ekstraklasa	22	7	0	0	—		—		22	7
Wisła Kraków	2020–21	Ekstraklasa	16	4	0	0	—		—		16	4
Wisła Kraków	2021–22	Ekstraklasa	2	0	0	0	—		—		2	0
Wisła Kraków	2022–23	I liga	2	0	0	0	—		—		2	0
Wisła Kraków	Total		50	16	0	0	—		—		50	16
Career total			375	60	32	3	47	3	5	1	459	67

=== International ===
Appearances and goals by national team and year
National team	Year	Apps	Goals
Poland	2006	6	0
Poland	2007	7	1
Poland	2008	6	1
Poland	2009	8	0
Poland	2010	9	2
Poland	2011	12	4
Poland	2012	10	4
Poland	2013	10	2
Poland	2014	0	0
Poland	2015	7	1
Poland	2016	14	3
Poland	2017	8	1
Poland	2018	8	2
Poland	2019	3	0
Poland	2020	0	0
Poland	2021	0	0
Poland	2022	0	0
Poland	2023	1	0
Total		109	21

Scores and results list Poland's goal tally first, score column indicates score after each Błaszczykowski goal.

List of international goals scored by Jakub Błaszczykowski
No.	Date	Venue	Opponent	Score	Result	Competition
1	22 August 2007	Lokomotiv Stadium, Moscow, Russia	Russia	2–2	2–2	Friendly
2	11 October 2008	Silesian Stadium, Chorzów, Poland	Czech Republic	2–0	2–1	2010 FIFA World Cup qualification
3	3 March 2010	Kazimierz Sosnkowski Stadium, Warsaw, Poland	Bulgaria	1–0	2–0	Friendly
4	9 October 2010	Soldier Field, Chicago, United States	United States	2–2	2–2	Friendly
5	10 August 2011	Zagłębie Stadium, Lubin, Poland	Georgia	1–0	1–0	Friendly
6	6 September 2011	Arena Gdańsk, Gdańsk, Poland	Germany	2–1	2–2	Friendly
7	7 October 2011	Seoul Olympic Stadium, Seoul, South Korea	South Korea	2–2	2–2	Friendly
8	11 October 2011	BRITA-Arena, Wiesbaden, Germany	Belarus	1–0	2–0	Friendly
9	2 June 2012	Polish Army Stadium, Warsaw, Poland	Andorra	3–0	4–0	Friendly
10	12 June 2012	National Stadium, Warsaw, Poland	Russia	1–1	1–1	UEFA Euro 2012
11	7 September 2012	Podgorica Stadium, Podgorica, Montenegro	Montenegro	1–0	2–2	2014 FIFA World Cup qualification
12	11 September 2012	Wrocław Stadium, Wrocław, Poland	Moldova	1–0	2–0	2014 FIFA World Cup qualification
13	7 June 2013	Zimbru Stadium, Chișinău, Moldova	Moldova	1–0	1–1	2014 FIFA World Cup qualification
14	10 September 2013	Stadio Olimpico, Serravalle, San Marino	San Marino	2–1	5–1	2014 FIFA World Cup qualification
15	7 September 2015	National Stadium, Warsaw, Poland	Gibraltar	6–0	8–1	UEFA Euro 2016 qualifying
16	23 March 2016	Poznań Stadium, Poznań, Poland	Serbia	1–0	1–0	Friendly
17	21 June 2016	Stade Vélodrome, Marseille, France	Ukraine	1–0	1–0	UEFA Euro 2016
18	25 June 2016	Stade Geoffroy-Guichard, Saint-Étienne, France	Switzerland	1–0	1–1	UEFA Euro 2016
19	5 October 2017	Vazgen Sargsyan Republican Stadium, Yerevan, Armenia	Armenia	4–1	6–1	2018 FIFA World Cup qualification
20	12 June 2018	National Stadium, Warsaw, Poland	Lithuania	4–0	4–0	Friendly
21	11 October 2018	Silesian Stadium, Chorzów, Poland	Portugal	2–3	2–3	2018–19 UEFA Nations League A

== Honours ==
Wisła Kraków

- Ekstraklasa: 2004–05

Borussia Dortmund

- Bundesliga: 2010–11, 2011–12
- DFB-Pokal: 2011–12
- DFL-Supercup: 2008, 2013
- UEFA Champions League runner-up: 2012–13

Individual

- Ekstraklasa Midfielder of the Year: 2006
- Ekstraklasa Best XI: 2006–07
- Polish Footballer of the Year: 2008, 2010
- Polish Footballer of the Year by Polish Footballers' Association: 2010
- Poland national football team's Best Player: 2010
- Footballer of the Year by the readers of "Sport": 2008, 2010
- Borussia Dortmund Player of the Year: 2008
- Ekstraklasa Player of the Month: March 2019

== See also ==
- List of men's footballers with 100 or more international caps
