= Aleksander Buksa =

Polish footballer (born 2003)

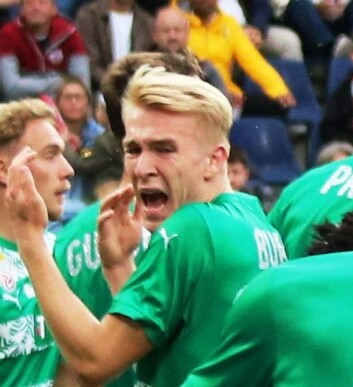
- Buksa in 2023 with WSG Tirol

Personal information
- Date of birth: 15 January 2003 (age 23)
- Place of birth: Kraków, Poland
- Height: 1.89 m (6 ft 2 in)
- Position: Forward

Team information
- Current team: Stal Rzeszów
- Number: 44

Youth career
- Bronowianka Kraków
- 2012–2014: AP 21 Kraków
- 2014–2019: Wisła Kraków

Senior career*
Years	Team	Apps	(Gls)
2019–2021	Wisła Kraków	38	(4)
2021–2024	Genoa	4	(0)
2022–2023	→ OH Leuven (loan)	0	(0)
2022–2023	→ OH Leuven U23 (loan)	16	(5)
2023	→ SL 16 FC (loan)	14	(4)
2023–2024	→ WSG Tirol (loan)	29	(1)
2024–2026	Górnik Zabrze	23	(1)
2024	Górnik Zabrze II	1	(0)
2025	→ GKS Katowice (loan)	4	(0)
2025–2026	→ Polonia Warsaw (loan)	14	(0)
2026–	Stal Rzeszów	8	(4)

International career
2018	Poland U15	6	(0)
2018–2019	Poland U16	7	(4)
2019	Poland U17	3	(0)
2020–2021	Poland U19	7	(4)
2022–2025	Poland U20	11	(1)
2022–2023	Poland U21	9	(1)
- * Club domestic league appearances and goals as of 17:59, 22 November 2026 (UTC)

Aleksander Buksa (born 15 January 2003) is a Polish professional footballer who plays as a forward for I liga club Stal Rzeszów.

== Club career ==
=== Wisła Kraków ===
Buksa was promoted to the Wisła Kraków senior team on 6 February 2019. He made his professional debut for the club on 22 April 2019 in a 2–3 league loss to Wisła Płock. He scored his first goal for the club against Jagiellonia Białystok in the league on 23 August 2019. The player, who made a name for himself with his successful performance and goals, attracted attention.

=== Genoa ===
On 1 July 2021, Buksa moved to Italian Serie A club Genoa, as his contract with the Polish side had expired. Buksa made his debut on 29 August 2021 in the league match against Napoli as a substitute in the 46th minute.

==== Loan to OH Leuven ====
On 22 August 2022, Buksa joined Belgian club OH Leuven on a season-long loan. Two weeks later, Buksa was an unused substitute in a 2–2 away draw at Anderlecht which would be his only selection for OH Leuven. He would only go on to appear 16 times and score 5 goals for the OH Leuven U23 team, which was playing at the third level of Belgian football. On 27 January 2023, OH Leuven announced the loan deal had been terminated by mutual consent.

==== Loan to SL 16 FC ====
On 29 January 2023, Standard Liège announced Buksa would be joining their second division reserve side until the end of the season. Later that day, he scored the opening goal in a 2–2 home draw against S.K. Beveren.

==== Loan to WSG Tirol ====
On 29 June 2023, Buksa was sent on another loan, this time joining Austrian Bundesliga club WSG Tirol until the end of the season.

=== Górnik Zabrze ===
After three years abroad, Buksa returned to Poland on 28 June 2024 to join top-flight outfit Górnik Zabrze on a three-year contract.

==== Loan to GKS Katowice ====
On 12 July 2025, Buksa joined fellow Ekstraklasa club GKS Katowice on a season-long loan with an option to buy. After making four appearances as a substitute, Buksa's loan was cut short on 8 September.

==== Loan to Polonia Warsaw ====
Hours after being recalled by Górnik, Buksa was sent on a season-loan with a buy-out option to I liga side Polonia Warsaw.

Buksa returned to Górnik in the summer of 2026. On 20 July 2026, he terminated his contract with the club by mutual consent.

=== Stal Rzeszów ===
On 22 July 2026, Buksa signed a two-year contract with Stal Rzeszów in the I liga.

== International career ==
Buksa has been capped at youth level for Poland.

== Personal life ==
Buksa is the brother of Polish professional footballer Adam Buksa, who currently plays for Mallorca, on loan from Udinese.

== Career statistics ==
As of match played 24 May 2026

Appearances and goals by club, season and competition
Club	Season	League			National cup (Note: Includes Polish Cup, Austrian Cup)		Europe		Other		Total	
Club	Season	Division	Apps	Goals	Apps	Goals	Apps	Goals	Apps	Goals	Apps	Goals
Wisła Kraków	2018–19	Ekstraklasa	4	0	0	0	—		—		4	0
Wisła Kraków	2019–20	Ekstraklasa	21	4	0	0	—		—		21	4
Wisła Kraków	2020–21	Ekstraklasa	13	0	1	0	—		—		14	0
Wisła Kraków	Total		38	4	1	0	—		—		39	4
Genoa	2021–22	Serie A	4	0	0	0	—		—		4	0
OH Leuven (loan)	2022–23	Belgian First Division A	0	0	0	0	—		—		0	0
SL 16 FC (loan)	2022–23	Belgian First Division B	14	4	0	0	—		—		14	4
WSG Tirol (loan)	2023–24	Austrian Bundesliga	29	1	2	2	—		—		31	3
Górnik Zabrze	2024–25	Ekstraklasa	23	1	1	0	—		—		24	1
Górnik Zabrze II	2024–25	III liga, group III	1	0	—		—		—		1	0
GKS Katowice (loan)	2025–26	Ekstraklasa	4	0	0	0	—		—		4	0
Polonia Warsaw (loan)	2025–26	I liga	14	0	1	0	—		0	0	15	0
Stal Rzeszów	2026–27	I liga	0	0	0	0	—		—		0	0
Career total			127	10	5	2	0	0	0	0	132	12

== Honours ==
Polonia Warsaw II

- V liga Masovia I: 2025–26
