= Artur Balicki =

Polish footballer

Personal information
- Full name: Artur Jan Balicki
- Date of birth: 11 October 1999 (age 27)
- Place of birth: Lublin, Poland
- Height: 1.83 m (6 ft 0 in)
- Position: Forward

Team information
- Current team: Victoria Łukowa
- Number: 11

Youth career
- Widok Lublin
- Ruch Chorzów

Senior career*
Years	Team	Apps	(Gls)
2017–2019	Ruch Chorzów	46	(9)
2019–2021	Wisła Kraków	2	(0)
2019–2020	→ Pogoń Siedlce (loan)	17	(1)
2020	→ Garbarnia Kraków (loan)	4	(0)
2021–2023	Legionovia Legionowo	34	(7)
2023	Podlasie Biała Podlaska	8	(6)
2023–2024	Orlęta Radzyń Podlaski	18	(3)
2024	Kormákur/Hvöt	20	(5)
2025–2026	KFK Kópavogur		
2026–	Victoria Łukowa	0	(0)

International career
2017	Poland U19	2	(0)
- * Club domestic league appearances and goals as of 25 November 2024

Artur Balicki (born 11 October 1999) is a Polish professional footballer who plays as a forward for regional league club Victoria Łukowa.

== Club career ==
On 5 October 2020, he joined Garbarnia Kraków on a season-long loan.

== Honours ==
Podlasie Biała Podlaska

- Polish Cup (Biała Podlaska regionals): 2022–23
