= Maksymilian Rozwandowicz =

Polish footballer

Personal information
- Date of birth: 18 June 1994 (age 32)
- Place of birth: Pabianice, Poland
- Height: 1.82 m (6 ft 0 in)
- Position: Defensive midfielder

Team information
- Current team: Zagłębie Sosnowiec
- Number: 29

Youth career
- 2003–2012: Włókniarz Pabianice
- 2012–2013: Widzew Łódź

Senior career*
| Years | Team | Apps | (Gls) |
| 2013–2015 | Widzew Łódź | 9 | (0) |
| 2015–2016 | Lechia Tomaszów Maz. | 29 | (2) |
| 2016–2017 | Chrobry Głogów | 4 | (0) |
| 2017–2022 | ŁKS Łódź | 144 | (17) |
| 2022–2024 | Zagłębie Sosnowiec | 65 | (3) |
| 2024–2026 | ŁKS Łódź II | 59 | (8) |
| 2026– | Zagłębie Sosnowiec | 0 | (0) |
- * Club domestic league appearances and goals as of 23:07, 30 May 2026 (UTC)

Maksymilian Rozwandowicz (born 18 June 1994) is a Polish professional footballer who plays as a defensive midfielder for and captains III liga club Zagłębie Sosnowiec.

== Honours ==
Lechia Tomaszów Mazowiecki

- Polish Cup (Łódź regionals): 2015–16
