= Kamil Juraszek =

Polish footballer (born 1991)

Personal information
- Date of birth: 26 March 1991 (age 35)
- Place of birth: Bielawa, Poland
- Height: 1.87 m (6 ft 2 in)
- Position: Centre-back

Team information
- Current team: Lechia Dzierżoniów
- Number: 24

Youth career
- –2009: Piławianka Piława Górna
- 2009–2010: Polonia Świdnica

Senior career*
Years	Team	Apps	(Gls)
2010–2011	Lechia Dzierżoniów		
2012–2013	Śląsk Wrocław II		
2012–2013	Śląsk Wrocław	0	(0)
2013–2014	Arka Gdynia	20	(2)
2014–2015	Bytovia Bytów	21	(0)
2015–2016	Lechia Dzierżoniów	30	(2)
2016–2020	ŁKS Łódź	86	(6)
2020–2021	Chrobry Głogów	22	(0)
2021–	Lechia Dzierżoniów	151	(12)
- * Club domestic league appearances and goals as of 09:13, 28 June 2026 (UTC)

Kamil Juraszek (born 26 March 1991) is a Polish professional footballer who plays as a centre-back for IV liga Lower Silesia club Lechia Dzierżoniów.

== Honours ==
Lechia Dzierżoniów

- IV liga Lower Silesia East: 2021–22
- Polish Cup (Lower Silesia regionals): 2021–22
- Polish Cup (Wałbrzych regionals): 2021–22, 2025–26
