= Daniel Morys =

Polish footballer (born 2000)

Personal information
- Full name: Daniel Morys
- Date of birth: 26 December 2000 (age 25)
- Place of birth: Kraków, Poland
- Height: 1.74 m (5 ft 9 in)
- Positions: Right-back; right winger

Team information
- Current team: KSZO Ostrowiec
- Number: 20

Youth career
- Wisła Kraków
- 2015–2016: Prądniczanka Kraków
- 2016–2019: Wisła Kraków

Senior career*
| Years | Team | Apps | (Gls) |
| 2019–2020 | Wisła Kraków | 2 | (0) |
| 2019–2020 | → Olimpia Elbląg (loan) | 15 | (0) |
| 2020–2022 | Garbarnia Kraków | 60 | (5) |
| 2022–2023 | Resovia | 14 | (0) |
| 2023 | → Stal Brzeg (loan) | 15 | (2) |
| 2023–2024 | Garbarnia Kraków | 16 | (3) |
| 2024– | KSZO Ostrowiec | 58 | (4) |
- * Club domestic league appearances and goals as of 19:37, 9 June 2026 (UTC)

Daniel Morys (born 26 December 2000) is a Polish professional footballer who plays as either a right-back or a right winger for III liga club KSZO Ostrowiec.

== Club career ==
On 19 September 2020, he signed a one-season contract with Garbarnia Kraków.
