= Emmanuel Kumah =

Ghanaian footballer (born 2000)

Personal information
- Date of birth: 9 February 2000 (age 26)
- Place of birth: Seikwa, Ghana
- Position: Midfielder

Youth career
- Tudu Mighty Jets

Senior career*
Years	Team	Apps	(Gls)
–2019	Tudu Mighty Jets		
2019	→ Wisła Kraków (loan)	5	(0)
2020–2023	Wieczysta Kraków	69	(9)
- * Club domestic league appearances and goals as of 30 January 2024

Emmanuel Kumah (born 9 February 2000) is a Ghanaian professional footballer who plays as a midfielder.

== Career ==
Kumah started. his career with Ghanaian second division side Tudu Mighty Jets. Before the second half of 2018–19, he was sent on loan to Wisła Kraków in the Polish top flight, where he made 6 appearances and scored 0 goals, after trialing for Spanish La Liga club Málaga, Austria Wien in Austria, German Bundesliga team Hoffenheim, and almost signing for Bologna in the Italian Serie A. On 25 April 2019, he debuted for Wisła Kraków during a 1–2 loss to Zagłębie Sosnowiec. Before the second half of 2019–20, Kumah signed for Polish sixth division outfit Wieczysta Kraków.

== Honours ==
Wieczysta Kraków

- IV liga Lesser Poland West: 2021–22
- Regional league, group: Kraków II: 2020–21
- Polish Cup (Lesser Poland regionals): 2020–21, 2021–22 2022–23
- Polish Cup (Kraków regionals): 2020–21
