= Mariusz Złotek =

Polish football referee (born 1970)

- Born: 26 April 1970 (age 55)

Domestic
Years	League	Role
2014–2021	Ekstraklasa	Referee

Mariusz Złotek (born 26 April 1970) is a former Polish football player, a football referee from 1996 to 2021, and since 2022, the chairman of the College of Referees of the Podkarpackie Football Association.

== Football club career ==
From the age of sixteen until 1996, he was a player for Stal Gorzyce, but his career was interrupted by a meniscus injury.

== Refereeing career ==
He began his career as a referee in 1996. In the 2013–14 season, he advanced to officiate in the Ekstraklasa, with his debut match at this level taking place between Cracovia and Śląsk Wrocław on 2 March 2014. Throughout his career, he officiated a total of 144 Ekstraklasa matches. He retired from refereeing in 2021, with his final Ekstraklasa match being between Legia Warsaw and Górnik Łęczna on 19 September, and his last professional match taking place on 28 September in the Polish Cup between Stal Gorzyce and Stal Stalowa Wola.

He has been recognized as a distinguished resident of the Gmina Gorzyce since 2 June 2022. On 18 September 2022, he was appointed as the president of the College of Referees of the Podkarpackie Football Association.
