= Hebert (footballer, born 1991) =

Brazilian footballer (born 1991)

Personal information
- Full name: Hebert Medeiros dos Santos
- Date of birth: 23 May 1991 (age 35)
- Place of birth: Barra Mansa, Rio de Janeiro State, Brazil
- Height: 1.91 m (6 ft 3 in)
- Position: Centre back

Youth career
- 2009: Ponte Preta
- 2010: Vasco da Gama

Senior career*
Years	Team	Apps	(Gls)
2011–2013	Vasco da Gama	0	(0)
2011–2012	→ Vasco da Gama Sines (loan)	41	(4)
2012–2013	→ Trofense (loan)	36	(2)
2013–2014	Braga	2	(0)
2013–2014	→ Braga B	10	(0)
2013–2014	→ Piast Gliwice (loan)	8	(0)
2014–2018	Piast Gliwice	108	(8)
2018–2021	JEF United Chiba	42	(4)
2020	→ Wisła Kraków (loan)	10	(1)
2021	Santa Cruz	3	(0)
2021–2022	Casa Pia	10	(0)
- * Club domestic league appearances and goals as of 23 May 2024

Hebert Medeiros dos Santos (born 23 May 1991), known as just Hebert, is a Brazilian professional footballer who plays as a centre back.

== Club career ==
Hebert kicked off his career with Vasco, but was loaned to Portuguese teams, and made 36 appearances with Trofense of Segunda Liga. Consequently, he was bought by Primeira Liga side Braga, where he failed to break into the first team.

On 17 January 2014, he joined Piast Gliwice on a six-month loan deal, only to make it permanent the following season.

On 2 July 2021, he returned to Portugal and signed with Casa Pia.

== Personal life ==
He was born in abject poverty in Barra Mansa; his mother struggled with alcohol addiction and his absent father was described as a dangerous maniac.
