= Lukas Klemenz =

German-born Polish footballer

Personal information
- Full name: Lukas Rafael Klemenz
- Date of birth: 24 September 1995 (age 31)
- Place of birth: Neu-Ulm, Germany
- Height: 1.91 m (6 ft 3 in)
- Position: Defender

Team information
- Current team: GKS Katowice
- Number: 6

Youth career
- Fortuna Głogówek
- Sparta Prudnik
- Fortuna Głogówek
- Pomologia Prószków

Senior career*
Years	Team	Apps	(Gls)
2011–2013	Odra Opole	41	(2)
2013–2015	Valenciennes FC	16	(1)
2015	→ Korona Kielce (loan)	10	(0)
2015–2016	GKS Bełchatów	22	(1)
2016–2017	Olimpia Grudziądz	22	(2)
2017–2018	GKS Katowice	27	(2)
2017–2018	Jagiellonia Białystok	83	(8)
2019–2021	Wisła Kraków	47	(1)
2021–2023	Budapest Honvéd	33	(1)
2023–2024	Górnik Łęczna	33	(1)
2024–	GKS Katowice	52	(7)

International career
2013	Poland U18	3	(0)
2013	Poland U19	13	(1)
2014–2016	Poland U20	13	(1)
- * Club domestic league appearances and goals as of 10:11, 30 May 2026 (UTC)

Lukas Rafael Klemenz (born 24 September 1995) is a professional footballer who plays as a defender for Ekstraklasa club GKS Katowice. Born in Germany, he represented Poland at youth level.

== Career ==
Klemenz started his career in Fortuna Głogówek. After a few weeks, he left the club and joined Sparta Prudnik. After two years of playing in Prudnik, he returned to Fortuna. Next, he continued his youth career with Pomologia Prószków.

In 2011, Klemenz started his senior career with Odra Opole in III liga. He left Odra in 2013 to sign with French club Valenciennes FC.

In 2015, he came back to Poland. He played in Korona Kielce, GKS Bełchatów, Olimpia Grudziądz and GKS Katowice. On 1 July 2018, he signed a contract with Jagiellonia Białystok.

On 21 January 2019, Klemenz moved to fellow Ekstraklasa club Wisła Kraków.

On 22 January 2021, he joined Budapest Honvéd.

On 23 June 2023, Klemenz returned to Poland and joined I liga side Górnik Łęczna on a two-year contract.

On 24 June 2024, he re-signed with Ekstraklasa returnees GKS Katowice, and penned a deal until the end of June 2026.

In January 2026, Klemenz signed a new two-and-a-half-year contract with GKS Katowice, valid until June 2028 and including an extension option. During the autumn part of the 2025–26 season, he made 17 appearances and scored four goals.

== Personal life ==
Klemenz was born in Germany to a Polish mother and an American father. His family moved to Poland when he was young.

== Honours ==
Odra Opole

- III liga Opole–Silesia: 2012–13

Individual

- I liga Player of the Season: 2016–17
- I liga Centre-back of the Season: 2016–17
- I liga Team of the Season: 2016–17
