= Damian Pawłowski =

Polish footballer (born 1999)

Personal information
- Date of birth: 27 January 1999 (age 27)
- Place of birth: Szczecin, Poland
- Height: 1.85 m (6 ft 1 in)
- Position: Midfielder

Team information
- Current team: Weszło Warsaw
- Number: 27

Youth career
- Salos Szczecin
- 2012–2015: Pogoń Szczecin

Senior career*
Years	Team	Apps	(Gls)
2015–2019	Pogoń Szczecin II	38	(1)
2017–2019	Pogoń Szczecin	0	(0)
2018–2019	→ Wigry Suwałki (loan)	28	(0)
2019–2021	Wisła Kraków	10	(0)
2020–2021	→ Stal Mielec (loan)	7	(0)
2021–2023	Zagłębie Sosnowiec	0	(0)
2022	→ Pogoń Grodzisk (loan)	7	(0)
2023–	Weszło Warsaw	91	(10)

International career
2014	Poland U15	6	(0)
2014–2015	Poland U16	9	(2)
2015–2016	Poland U17	4	(0)
2016	Poland U18	4	(2)
2016	Poland U19	2	(0)
2018–2019	Poland U20	4	(0)
- * Club domestic league appearances and goals as of 21:39, 25 June 2026 (UTC)

Damian Pawłowski (born 27 January 1999) is a Polish professional footballer who plays as a midfielder for III liga club Weszło Warsaw.

== Honours ==
Weszło Warsaw

- IV liga Masovia: 2025–26
- Polish Cup (Warsaw regionals): 2023–24
