= Chuca =

Spanish footballer

Personal information
- Full name: Víctor Moya Martínez
- Date of birth: 10 June 1997 (age 29)
- Place of birth: Jacarilla, Spain
- Height: 1.82 m (6 ft 0 in)
- Position: Midfielder

Team information
- Current team: Sloga Doboj
- Number: 22

Youth career
- Roda
- Villarreal

Senior career*
Years	Team	Apps	(Gls)
2016–2019	Villarreal B	49	(6)
2016–2017	Villarreal C	38	(6)
2017–2019	Villarreal	4	(0)
2018–2019	→ Elche (loan)	6	(0)
2019–2021	Wisła Kraków	38	(5)
2021–2025	Miedź Legnica	69	(12)
2023–2024	→ Racing Ferrol (loan)	12	(0)
2025	Unionistas de Salamanca	14	(1)
2025–2026	Cartagena	6	(0)
2026	Arenteiro	16	(1)
2026–	Sloga Doboj	8	(2)
- * Club domestic league appearances and goals as of 20 September 2026

Víctor Moya Martínez (born 10 June 1997), commonly known as Chuca, is a Spanish professional footballer who plays as a central midfielder for Bosnian Premier League club Sloga Doboj.

== Club career ==
Born in Jacarilla, Alicante, Valencian Community, Chuca was a Villarreal CF youth graduate. He made his senior debut with the reserves on 17 April 2016, coming on as a second-half substitute in a 1–2 Segunda División B away loss against CD Eldense.

Chuca scored his first senior goal in his debut for the C-team, netting his team's second in a 3–2 home win against CD Torrevieja in the Tercera División on 28 August 2016. He made his first team – and La Liga – debut on 10 September of the following year, replacing fellow youth graduate Manu Trigueros in a 3–1 home win against Real Betis.

On 23 July 2018, Chuca was loaned to Segunda División side Elche CF for one season. The following 23 January, after being rarely used, his loan was cut short.

On 31 July 2019, Chuca moved abroad for the first time in his career and signed for Polish Ekstraklasa side Wisła Kraków. On 27 August 2021, he moved to I liga team Miedź Legnica, and was regularly used in the club's promotion to the top tier at the end of the campaign.

On 14 July 2023, Chuca returned to his home country after agreeing to a one-year loan deal with Racing de Ferrol, newly-promoted to the second tier.

On 21 January 2025, Chuca left Poland for Spain again, this time on a permanent basis, to join third-tier side Unionistas de Salamanca on a six-month deal, with an option to extend.

== Career statistics ==
As of match played 20 September 2026

Appearances and goals by club, season and competition
Club	Season	League			National cup (Note: Includes Copa del Rey, Polish Cup)		Continental		Other		Total	
Club	Season	Division	Apps	Goals	Apps	Goals	Apps	Goals	Apps	Goals	Apps	Goals
Villarreal B	2015–16	Segunda División B	3	0	—		—		—		3	0
Villarreal B	2016–17	Segunda División B	7	0	—		—		—		7	0
Villarreal B	2017–18	Segunda División B	27	6	—		—		5 (Note: Appearances in the 2018 Segunda División B play-offs)	0	32	6
Villarreal B	2018–19	Segunda División B	12	0	—		—		1 (Note: Appearance in the 2019 Segunda División B play-offs)	0	13	0
Villarreal B	Total		49	6	—		—		6	0	55	6
Villarreal C	2016–17	Tercera División	38	6	—		—		—		38	6
Villarreal	2017–18	La Liga	4	0	2	1	2 (Note: Appearances in UEFA Europa League)	0	—		8	1
Elche (loan)	2018–19	Segunda División	6	0	1	0	—		—		7	0
Wisła Kraków	2019–20	Ekstraklasa	25	2	—		—		—		25	2
Wisła Kraków	2020–21	Ekstraklasa	13	3	1	1	—		—		14	4
Wisła Kraków	Total		38	5	1	1	—		—		39	6
Miedź Legnica	2021–22	I liga	23	5	1	0	—		—		24	5
Miedź Legnica	2022–23	Ekstraklasa	30	6	1	0	—		—		31	6
Miedź Legnica	2024–25	I liga	16	1	1	0	—		—		17	1
Miedź Legnica	Total		69	12	3	0	—		—		72	12
Racing Ferrol (loan)	2023–24	Segunda División	12	0	—		—		—		12	0
Unionistas	2024–25	Primera Federación	14	1	—		—		—		14	1
Cartagena	2025–26	Primera Federación	6	0	2	0	—		—		8	0
Arenteiro	2025–26	Primera Federación	16	1	—		—		—		16	1
Sloga Doboj	2026–27	Bosnian Premier League	8	2	0	0	—		—		8	2
Career total			260	33	9	2	2	0	6	0	277	35

== Honours ==
Miedź Legnica

- I liga: 2021–22
