= Kamil Wojtkowski =

Polish footballer

Personal information
- Full name: Kamil Wojtkowski
- Date of birth: 26 February 1998 (age 28)
- Place of birth: Sokołów Podlaski, Poland
- Height: 1.73 m (5 ft 8 in)
- Position: Midfielder

Team information
- Current team: Avia Świdnik

Youth career
- OSiR Sokołów Podlaski
- 2010–2013: Legia Warsaw
- 2015–2017: RB Leipzig

Senior career*
Years	Team	Apps	(Gls)
2014–2015	Pogoń Szczecin II	9	(0)
2014–2015	Pogoń Szczecin	8	(0)
2015–2016	RB Leipzig II	2	(0)
2017	RB Leipzig	0	(0)
2017–2020	Wisła Kraków	68	(4)
2020–2021	Jagiellonia Białystok	7	(0)
2021	Volos	8	(0)
2022	Ethnikos Achna	12	(1)
2022–2024	Motor Lublin	37	(1)
2024–2025	Stal Stalowa Wola	24	(0)
2025–	Avia Świdnik	4	(0)

International career
2013–2014	Poland U16	2	(0)
2014–2015	Poland U17	12	(6)
2015–2016	Poland U18	6	(1)
2016–2017	Poland U19	8	(2)
2017	Poland U20	1	(0)
- * Club domestic league appearances and goals as of 22:25, 31 May 2026 (UTC)

Kamil Wojtkowski (born 26 February 1998) is a Polish professional footballer who plays as a midfielder for II liga club Avia Świdnik.

== Club career ==
Wojtkowski started playing football at his local team, OSiR Sokołów Podlaski. In 2010, he joined Legia Warsaw, where he spent four years.

Kamil joined Fulham FC youth squad during summer 2013, and trained and played with them for about half of the year. Legia and Fulham were unable to reach terms, so Wojtkowski returned to Poland.

In 2014, Wojtkowski joined Pogoń Szczecin. On 18 October 2014, he made his Ekstraklasa debut for Pogoń, coming on as a substitute in second half of an away match against Jagiellonia Białystok. At age 16 years and 234 days, he was the youngest player ever to make an appearance for the club.

On 29 June 2015, he signed for the 2. Bundesliga club RB Leipzig and played in the U19 team.

On 3 July 2017, he signed a contract with Wisła Kraków. On 30 July 2020, he left Wisła, as his contract was not extended. On 3 November 2020, he was announced as a Jagiellonia Białystok player. On 23 March 2021, his contract was terminated.

In 2021, he played for the Greek Volos F.C., appearing in eight Super League matches and two Greek Cup fixtures. On 22 December 2021, his contract with the club was terminated by mutual agreement.

On 12 January 2022, Wojtkowski joined the Cypriot club Ethnikos Achna. He made his first appearance for the club on 15 January, coming on as a substitute for Artūrs Karašausks in a 4–0 Cypriot First Division home defeat against APOEL. Wojtkowski netted his first goal on 7 February, scoring deep into stoppage time as Ethnikos recorded a 2–0 victory over Omonia.

On 12 October 2022, Wojtkowski returned to Poland to join II liga side Motor Lublin on a two-year deal. After two successive promotions with Motor, he was released by the club at the end of his contract in June 2024.

On 9 July 2024, he joined I liga side Stal Stalowa Wola. He made his debut on 20 July, in a 0–1 defeat with GKS Górnik Łęczna. On 7 August 2024, he scored his first goal for the team in the 66th minute, during a 4–2 victory against Olimpia Elbląg in the preliminary round of the Polish Cup. Wojtkowski left the club at the end of his contract in June 2025.

On 11 September 2025, Wojtkowski signed with fourth tier side Avia Świdnik.

== Honours ==
Avia Świdnik

- III liga, group IV: 2025–26
- Polish Cup (Lublin regionals): 2025–26
- Polish Cup (Lublin subdistrict regionals): 2025–26
