= Patryk Plewka =

Polish footballer

Personal information
- Full name: Patryk Plewka
- Date of birth: 2 January 2000 (age 26)
- Place of birth: Libiąż, Poland
- Height: 1.74 m (5 ft 9 in)
- Position: Midfielder

Youth career
- –2013: Janina Libiąż
- 2013–2017: Wisła Kraków

Senior career*
Years	Team	Apps	(Gls)
2017–2023	Wisła Kraków	64	(1)
2019–2020	→ Stal Rzeszów (loan)	24	(2)
2023–2024	Chrobry Głogów	12	(0)
2024–2026	Znicz Pruszków	50	(0)
- * Club domestic league appearances and goals as of 16:19, 26 May 2026 (UTC)

Patryk Plewka (born 2 January 2000) is a Polish professional footballer who plays as a midfielder.

== Career ==
=== Wisła Kraków ===
Plewka is a product of Wisła Kraków and got his first team debut in July 2018. On 2 September 2019, Plewka joined Stal Rzeszów on loan for the rest of the season.

On 23 June 2023, after almost ten years with the team, Plewka left Wisła after terminating his contract by mutual consent.

=== Chrobry Głogów ===
After remaining unattached throughout the summer of 2023, on 14 September that year Plewka joined I liga side Chrobry Głogów on a one-year deal.

=== Znicz Pruszków ===
On 25 June 2024, hours after Chrobry announced Plewka would not remain with the club, he joined another I liga club Znicz Pruszków.
