= Nikola Kuveljić =

Serbian footballer

Personal information
- Date of birth: 6 April 1997 (age 29)
- Place of birth: Zemun, FR Yugoslavia
- Height: 1.94 m (6 ft 4 in)
- Position: Midfielder

Team information
- Current team: Spartak Subotica
- Number: 33

Youth career
- Zemun

Senior career*
Years	Team	Apps	(Gls)
2016–2017	IMT	54	(4)
2018	Jedinstvo Surčin	14	(0)
2018–2020	Javor Ivanjica	36	(3)
2020	→ Wisła Kraków (loan)	12	(0)
2020–2023	Wisła Kraków	29	(1)
2022–2023	→ TSC (loan)	28	(0)
2023–2025	TSC	17	(1)
2025–	Spartak Subotica	21	(3)
- * Club domestic league appearances and goals as of 13 June 2026

Nikola Kuveljić (born 6 April 1997) is a Serbian professional footballer who plays as a midfielder for Serbian SuperLiga club Spartak Subotica.

== Career ==
He was born in Zemun, a municipality of the city of Belgrade. He spent his youth career at the local club FK Zemun. His first senior club was FK IMT, playing in the Serbian League Belgrade (third national tier), for which he made his debut in the 2015–16 season.

In 2018, he moved to Jedinstvo Surčin, a club playing in the same league. For the 2018–19 season, he moved to Javor Ivanjica, playing in the Serbian First League. He helped the team with promotion to the Serbian SuperLiga for the 2019–20 season.

On 19 January 2020, he was loaned to Polish Ekstraklasa club Wisła Kraków for the rest of the season with an option to buy. On 28 May 2020, it was confirmed that the Polish club had triggered the option and Kuveljić signed a permanent deal until June 2023.

On 12 July 2022, he moved back to Serbia to join TSC on a one-year loan spell. The move was made permanent on 18 April 2023, when TSC Bačka Topola exercised their buy clause.

Having made just one appearance for TSC across the 2024–25 season due to an injury, on 9 January 2025 he signed for Spartak Subotica on a two-and-a-half-year deal.
