= 2021–22 Wisła Kraków season =

Wisła Kraków 2021–22 football season

Wisła Kraków
2021–22 season
- Chairman: Dawid Błaszczykowski
- Manager(s): Adrián Guľa (until 14 February 2022); Jerzy Brzęczek (from 14 February 2022)
- Ekstraklasa: 17th (relegated)
- Polish Cup: Quarter-finals
Home colours	Away colours	Third colours

The 2021–22 Wisła Kraków season was the 82nd season in the Ekstraklasa and the 68th season in the Polish Cup.

== Transfers ==
=== Summer transfer window ===
==== Arrivals ====
- The following players moved to Wisła.

	Name	Position	Transfer type	Previous club	Fee	Ref.
	Transfer					
Substituted on	(Poland) Mateusz Młyński	Midfielder	1 July 2021	(Poland) Arka Gdynia	Free	
Substituted on	(Poland) Hubert Sobol	Forward	1 July 2021	(Poland) Lech Poznań	Free	
Substituted on	(Poland) Alan Uryga	Defender	1 July 2021	(Poland) Wisła Płock	Free	
Substituted on	(Netherlands) Aschraf El Mahdioui	Midfielder	1 July 2021	(Slovakia) AS Trenčín	Free	
Substituted on	(Czech Republic) Jan Kliment	Forward	1 July 2021	(Czech Republic) 1. FC Slovácko	Free	
Substituted on	(Poland) Mikołaj Biegański	Goalkeeper	1 July 2021	(Poland) Skra Częstochowa	Free	
Substituted on	(Israel) Dor Hugi	Midfielder	1 July 2021	(Austria) SKN St. Pölten	Free	
Substituted on	(Slovakia) Michal Škvarka	Midfielder	6 July 2021	(Hungary) Ferencváros	Free	
Substituted on	(Poland) Kacper Rosa	Goalkeeper	6 July 2021	(Poland) Odra Opole	Free	
Substituted on	(Poland) Paweł Kieszek	Goalkeeper	5 August 2021	(Portugal) Rio Ave	Free	
	On loan					
Substituted on	(Czech Republic) Matěj Hanousek	Defender	7 July 2021	(Czech Republic) Sparta Prague	Free	
	Return from loan spell					
Substituted on	(Montenegro) Fatos Bećiraj	Forward	1 July 2021	(Israel) Bnei Yehuda Tel Aviv	Free	

==== Departures ====
- The following players moved from Wisła.

	Name	Position	Transfer type	New club	Fee	Ref.
	Transfer					
Substituted off	(Ivory Coast) Souleymane Kone	Defender	17 May 2021	Released	Free	
Substituted off	(Ghana) David Mawutor	Midfielder	17 May 2021	(Kazakhstan) Shakhter Karagandy	Free	
Substituted off	(Poland) Łukasz Burliga	Midfielder	1 July 2021	(Poland) Wieczysta Kraków	Free	
Substituted off	(Brazil) Jean Carlos	Forward	1 July 2021	(Poland) Pogoń Szczecin	Free	
Substituted off	(Poland) Damian Pawłowski	Midfielder	1 July 2021	(Poland) Zagłębie Sosnowiec	Free	
Substituted off	(Poland) Rafał Boguski	Midfielder	1 July 2021	(Poland) Puszcza Niepołomice	Free	
Substituted off	(Poland) Aleksander Buksa	Forward	1 July 2021	(Italy) Genoa	Free	
Substituted off	(Albania) Vullnet Basha	Midfielder	5 July 2021	(Greece) Ionikos	Free	
Substituted off	(Montenegro) Fatos Bećiraj	Forward	9 July 2021	(Kazakhstan) Astana	Free	
Substituted off	(Spain) Chuca	Midfielder	24 July 2021	(Poland) Miedź Legnica	Free	
Substituted off	(Poland) Mateusz Lis	Goalkeeper	5 August 2021	(Turkey) Altay	€700,000	
	On loan					
Substituted off	(Poland) Kamil Broda	Goalkeeper	6 July 2021	(Poland) Chojniczanka Chojnice	Free	
Substituted off	(Poland) Daniel Hoyo-Kowalski	Defender	8 July 2021	(Poland) Hutnik Kraków	Free	
Substituted off	(Poland) Wiktor Szywacz	Midfielder	13 July 2021	(Poland) Garbarnia Kraków	Free	
Substituted off	(Poland) Sławomir Chmiel	Midfielder	21 July 2021	(Poland) Hutnik Kraków	Free	
Substituted off	(Poland) Kacper Duda	Midfielder	1 September 2021	(Poland) Garbarnia Kraków	Free	
	End of loan					
Substituted off	(Slovenia) Žan Medved	Forward	1 July 2021	(Slovakia) Slovan Bratislava	Free	
Substituted off	(Serbia) Uroš Radaković	Defender	1 July 2021	(Czech Republic) Sparta Prague	Free	

=== Winter transfer window ===
==== Arrivals ====
- The following players moved to Wisła.

	Name	Position	Transfer type	Previous club	Fee	Ref.
	Transfer					
Substituted on	(Sweden) Sebastian Ring	Defender	18 December 2021	(Sweden) Kalmar FF	Free	
Substituted on	(Czech Republic) Zdeněk Ondrášek	Forward	7 January 2022	(Norway) Tromsø IL	Free	
Substituted on	(Spain) Luis Fernández	Forward	11 January 2022	(United Arab Emirates) Khor Fakkan Club	Free	
Substituted on	(Sweden) Joseph Colley	Defender	18 January 2022	(Italy) Chievo	Free	
Substituted on	(North Macedonia) Enis Fazlagikj	Midfielder	21 January 2022	(Slovakia) Žilina	€500,000	
Substituted on	(Serbia) Marko Poletanović	Midfielder	27 February 2022	(Poland) Raków Częstochowa	Free	
Substituted on	(Netherlands) Elvis Manu	Midfielder	28 February 2022	(Bulgaria) Ludogorets Razgrad	Free	
	On loan					
Substituted on	(Guinea) Momo Cissé	Midfielder	16 January 2022	(Germany) VfB Stuttgart	Free	
Substituted on	(Georgia (country)) Heorhiy Tsitaishvili	Midfielder	6 April 2022	(Ukraine) Dynamo Kyiv	Free	

==== Departures ====
- The following players moved from Wisła.

	Name	Position	Transfer type	New club	Fee	Ref.
	Transfer					
Substituted off	(Poland) Michał Buchalik	Goalkeeper	23 December 2021	(Poland) Lechia Gdańsk	Free	
Substituted off	(Ghana) Yaw Yeboah	Midfielder	6 January 2022	(United States) Columbus Crew SC	€1,820,000	
Substituted off	(Netherlands) Aschraf El Mahdioui	Midfielder	21 January 2022	(Saudi Arabia) Al Taawoun	€2,400,000	
Substituted off	(Costa Rica) Felicio Brown Forbes	Forward	4 February 2022	(China) Wuhan Yangtze River	Free	
Substituted off	(Poland) Przemysław Zdybowicz	Forward	11 March 2022	(Poland) Orlęta Radzyń Podlaski	Free	
	On loan					
Substituted off	(Poland) Krystian Wachowiak	Defender	18 January 2022	(Poland) GKS Tychy	Free	
Substituted off	(Bosnia and Herzegovina) Adi Mehremić	Defender	20 January 2022	(Israel) Maccabi Petah Tikva	Free	
Substituted off	(Poland) Hubert Sobol	Forward	3 February 2022	(Poland) Stomil Olsztyn	Free	
Substituted off	(Poland) Paweł Koncewicz-Żyłka	Defender	11 March 2022	(Poland) Orlęta Radzyń Podlaski	Free	

== Competitions ==
=== Preseason and friendlies ===
26 June 2021	Wisła Kraków	3–2	Stal Mielec	Myślenice, Poland
11:15 UTC+2	Gruszkowski 8'; Błaszczykowski (penalty missed) 21'; Frydrych 47' (pen.); Yeboah 69' (pen.); Gruszkowski (yellow card); Sobol (yellow card)	Report	Tomasiewicz 25' (pen.); Kolev 50'; Chorbadzhiyski (yellow card); Mak (yellow card)	Stadium: Sport Myślenice; Referee: Sebastian Krasny (Kraków)

3 July 2021	MFK Tatran Liptovský Mikuláš (Slovakia)	1–3	Wisła Kraków	Liptovský Mikuláš, Slovakia
17:00 UTC+2	Laura 49'	Report	Starzyński 29'; Hranáč 36' (o.g.); Frydrych 78' (pen.)	Stadium: Stadium Liptovský Mikuláš

7 July 2021	Puszcza Niepołomice	2–3	Wisła Kraków	Rzeszów, Poland
15:00 UTC+2	Boguski 40'; Hladík 50'	Report	Zhukov 18'; Błaszczykowski 22' (pen.); Chuca 57' (pen.)	Stadium: Stadion Miejski; Referee: Mariusz Złotek (Stalowa Wola)

14 July 2021	Resovia Rzeszów	2–1	Wisła Kraków	Arłamów, Poland
11:00 UTC+2	Hebel 45'; Strózik 62'	Report	Starzyński 39'	Stadium: Arłamów Arena; Referee: Mariusz Złotek (Stalowa Wola)

17 July 2021	Wisła Kraków	1–1	Podbeskidzie Bielsko-Biała	Kraków, Poland
20:15 UTC+2	Yeboah 3'; Frydrych (penalty missed) 70'; Savić (yellow card)	Report	Biliński 29'; Rodríguez (yellow card)	Stadium: Stadion im. Henryka Reymana; Referee: Grzegorz Jabłoński (Kraków)

4 August 2021	Wisła Kraków	1−2	(Italy) Napoli	Kraków, Poland
18:00 UTC+2	Forbes 6'	Report	Politano (penalty missed) 30', 67'; Machach 85'; Rui (yellow card); Koulibaly (yellow card); Manolas (yellow card)	Stadium: Stadion im. Henryka Reymana; Attendance: 16,600; Referee: Mariusz Złotek (Stalowa Wola)

4 September 2021	Garbarnia Kraków	2−2	Wisła Kraków	Kraków, Poland
16:00 UTC+2	Słomka 25'; Biegański 43' (o.g.)	Report	Hugi 9'; Sokol 62'	Stadium: Stadion RKS Garbarnia; Referee: Tomasz Musiał (Kraków)

9 October 2021	Glinik Gorlice	0−6	Wisła Kraków	Gorlice, Poland
12:00 UTC+2	Grela (yellow card); T. Mituś (yellow card)	Report	Wachowiak 43', 46', 81'; Škvarka 44'; Szota 52'; Zdybowicz 85'; Szot (yellow card)	Stadium: Stadion OSiR im. Maksymiliana Kumorkiewicza; Attendance: 1,500; Referee: Waldemar Pyznar (Gorlice)

12 November 2021	Stal Mielec	1–1	Wisła Kraków	Wola Chorzelowska, Poland
11:00 UTC+1	Kolev 52'	Report	Wachowiak 37'; Szota (yellow card); Szot (yellow card)	Stadium: Hotel Rado Resort

12 January 2022	Wisła Kraków	3−0	(Slovakia) MFK Tatran Liptovský Mikuláš	Myślenice, Poland
12:00 UTC+1	Hugi 13'; Kuveljić 39'; Škvarka 84'; Plewka (yellow card)	Report		Stadium: Sport Myślenice; Referee: Sebastian Krasny (Kraków)

18 January 2022	Wisła Kraków	1−1	(Bulgaria) Ludogorets Razgrad	Kumköy, Turkey
17:30 UTC+1	Szot 79'; Koncewicz-Żyłka (yellow card)	Report	Sotiriou 4'	Stadium: Calista Sports Center

21 January 2022	Wisła Kraków	1−3	(Czech Republic) Baník Ostrava	Kadriye, Turkey
11:00 UTC+1	Plewka 39'; Forbes (penalty missed) 69'; Starzyński (yellow card); Szota (yellow card); Ring (yellow card)	Report	Almási 12', 48'; Kontsevoy 76'	Stadium: IC Hotels Football Center

25 January 2022	Wisła Kraków	0−0	(Azerbaijan) Qarabağ	Belek, Turkey
14:45 UTC+1	Kliment (penalty missed) 53'; Fazlagikj (yellow card)	Report	Bayramov (yellow card); Wadji (yellow card)	Stadium: Gloria Sports Arena
Note: The game was played in three parts of 45 minutes each.

25 March 2022	Puszcza Niepołomice	0–5	Wisła Kraków	Wola Chorzelowska, Poland
11:30 UTC+2		Report	Hugi 9'; Manu 34'; Kliment 67'; Fernández 71'; Ondrášek 86'	Stadium: Hotel Rado Resort

=== Ekstraklasa ===
==== League table ====
Pos	Team	Pld	W	D	L	GF	GA	GD	Pts	Qualification or relegation
14	Stal Mielec	34	9	10	15	39	52	−13	37	
15	Śląsk Wrocław	34	7	14	13	42	52	−10	35	
16	Bruk-Bet Termalica Nieciecza (R)	34	7	11	16	36	56	−20	32	Relegation to I liga
17	Wisła Kraków (R)	34	7	10	17	37	54	−17	31	Relegation to I liga
18	Górnik Łęczna (R)	34	6	10	18	29	60	−31	28	Relegation to I liga

Source: ekstraklasa.org
Rules for classification: 1) Points; 2) Head-to-head points; 3) Head-to-head goal difference; 4) Goal difference; 5) Goals scored; 6) Number of wins; 7) Number of away wins; 8) Lower number of points based on yellow and red cards (red card = 3 points, yellow card = 1 point, sending-off = 3 points - including 1 point for first yellow card); 9) Fairplay ranking; 10) Draw. (Note: Head-to-head record is used only after all the matches between the teams in question have been played)
(R) Relegated

==== Results summary ====
Overall								Home						Away					
Pld	W	D	L	GF	GA	GD	Pts	W	D	L	GF	GA	GD	W	D	L	GF	GA	GD
33	7	9	17	35	52	−17	30	5	4	7	19	19	0	2	5	10	16	33	−17

Last updated: 21 May 2022.
Source: 90minut

==== Results by round ====
Round	1	2	3	4	5	6	7	8	9	10	11	12	13	14	15	16	17	18	19	20	21	22	23	24	25	26	27	28	29	30	31	32	33	34
Ground	H	A	H	A	A	H	H	A	H	A	A	H	A	H	A	H	A	A	H	A	H	H	A	A	H	A	H	H	A	H	A	H	A	H
Result	W	D	L	L	W	W	D	L	L	L	W	L	L	W	L	L	D	L	W	L	L	D	L	D	D	L	D	W	D	L	D	D	L	L
Position	1	1	9	13	7	4	5	10	12	14	13	14	15	13	13	14	14	15	13	14	14	16	17	17	16	16	16	16	16	16	16	16	16	17

Updated to match(es) played on 21 May 2022. Source: 90minut
A = Away; H = Home; W = Win; D = Draw; L = Loss

==== Matches ====
26 July 2021 1	Wisła Kraków	3–0	Zagłębie Lubin	Kraków
18:00 UTC+2	Yeboah 25' (pen.); Kliment 29'; El Mahdioui (yellow card) 36'; Sadlok (yellow card) 45+5'; Zhukov (yellow card) 66'; Młyński (yellow card) 78', (goal) 81'	Report	Starzyński (penalty missed) 6'; Pino (yellow card) 28'	Stadium: Stadion im. Henryka Reymana; Attendance: 13,668; Referee: Piotr Lasyk (Bytom)

31 July 2021 2	Bruk-Bet Termalica Nieciecza	2–2	Wisła Kraków	Nieciecza
17:30 UTC+2	Biedrzycki (yellow card) 22'; Radwański 28'; Wlazło 66', (yellow card) 90+8'	Report	Zhukov 57'; Gruszkowski (yellow card) 80'; Sadlok 90'	Stadium: Stadion Sportowy; Attendance: 4,480; Referee: Tomasz Kwiatkowski (Warsaw)

8 August 2021 3	Wisła Kraków	1−2	Raków Częstochowa	Kraków
17:30 UTC+2	Yeboah 24'	Report	Musiolik (yellow card) 34'; Papanikolaou (red card) 51'; Cebula 61', (yellow card) 72'; Gutkovskis 79'	Stadium: Stadion im. Henryka Reymana; Attendance: 15,317; Referee: Krzysztof Jakubik (Siedlce)

13 August 2021 4	Stal Mielec	2−1	Wisła Kraków	Mielec
20:30 UTC+2	Urbańczyk (yellow card) 3'; Budziński (yellow card) 8'; Kolev 42', (yellow card) 64'; Mak 52'	Report	El Mahdioui (yellow card) 21'; Kliment 47'; Sadlok (yellow card) 64'	Stadium: Stadion MOSiR; Attendance: 3,413; Referee: Szymon Marciniak (Płock)

23 August 2021 5	Górnik Łęczna	1−3	Wisła Kraków	Łęczna
18:00 UTC+2	Rymaniak (yellow card) 28'; Frydrych 74' (o.g.)	Report	Škvarka 20'; Młyński (yellow card) 35'; Yeboah 48'; Forbes 62'; Gruszkowski (yellow card) 63'	Stadium: Stadion Miejski; Attendance: 4,014; Referee: Łukasz Kuźma (Białystok)

29 August 2021 6	Wisła Kraków	1−0	Legia Warszawa	Kraków
17:30 UTC+2	Brown 29'; Plewka (yellow card) 31'	Report	Pekhart (yellow card) 58'; Abu Hanna (yellow card) 65'	Stadium: Stadion im. Henryka Reymana; Attendance: 23,717; Referee: Zbigniew Dobrynin (Łódź)

12 September 2021 7	Wisła Kraków	2−2	Lechia Gdańsk	Kraków
15:00 UTC+2	Kliment (yellow card) 12'; Brown (yellow card) 31'; Frydrych 71', 90+7'; Szota (yellow card) 90' (yellow-red card) 90+3'	Report	Kubicki 23', (yellow card) 35'; Durmuş 45+1'; Nalepa (yellow card) 49'; Zwoliński (yellow card) 83'; Sezonienko (yellow card) 84'	Stadium: Stadion im. Henryka Reymana; Attendance: 15,869; Referee: Paweł Raczkowski (Warsaw)

17 September 2021 8	Lech Poznań	5−0	Wisła Kraków	Poznań
20:30 UTC+2	Amaral 29'; Karlström (yellow card) 43'; Ba Loua 45+1'; Rebocho 52'; Ishak 60', 76' (pen.); Ramírez (yellow card) 85'	Report	Frydrych (yellow card) 8'; Škvarka (yellow card) 35'; El Mahdioui (yellow card) 42'; Gruszkowski (yellow card) 50'; Szota (yellow card) 75'; Brown (yellow card) 78'	Stadium: Stadion Poznań; Attendance: 26,890; Referee: Tomasz Kwiatkowski (Warsaw)

26 September 2021 9	Wisła Kraków	0−1	Pogoń Szczecin	Kraków
17:30 UTC+2	Brown (yellow card) 28'; Savić (yellow card) 90+1'	Report	Jean Carlos 15'; Bartkowski (yellow card) 90'; Kucharczyk (yellow card) 90+3'	Stadium: Stadion im. Henryka Reymana; Attendance: 15,017; Referee: Szymon Marciniak (Płock)

1 October 2021 10	Piast Gliwice	1−0	Wisła Kraków	Gliwice
20:30 UTC+2	Chrapek (yellow card) 34'; Toril 68'	Report	Gruszkowski (yellow card) 34'; El Mahdioui (yellow card) 65'; Kieszek (yellow card) 68'; Yeboah (yellow card) 75'	Stadium: Stadion im. Piotra Wieczorka; Attendance: 4,420; Referee: Damian Sylwestrzak (Wrocław)

17 October 2021 11	Górnik Zabrze	0−1	Wisła Kraków	Zabrze
17:30 UTC+2	Gryszkiewicz (yellow card) 27'	Report	Frydrych 50'	Stadium: Stadion im. Ernesta Pohla; Attendance: 15,079; Referee: Bartosz Frankowski (Toruń)

23 October 2021 12	Wisła Kraków	0−5	Śląsk Wrocław	Kraków
20:00 UTC+2	Gruszkowski (yellow card) 23'; Frydrych (yellow card) 25'; Szot (yellow card) 47'	Report	Expósito 7', 12', 77' (pen.); Verdasca 27'; Schwarz (yellow card) 43'; Zylla 90+1'	Stadium: Stadion im. Henryka Reymana; Attendance: 13,563; Referee: Piotr Lasyk (Bytom)

31 October 2021 13	Wisła Płock	2−0	Wisła Kraków	Płock
12:30 UTC+1	Sekulski 39', 48'; Szwoch (yellow card) 41'; Wolski (yellow card) 57'; Rzeźniczak (yellow card) 84'	Report	Forbes (yellow card) 10'; Sobol (yellow card) 69'; Zhukov (yellow card) 90+1'	Stadium: Stadion im. Kazimierza Górskiego; Attendance: 1,000; Referee: Tomasz Kwiatkowski (Warsaw)

7 November 2021 14	Wisła Kraków	1−0	Cracovia	Kraków
20:00 UTC+1	El Mahdioui (yellow card) 23'; Kliment (yellow card) 37'; Yeboah 52'; Sadlok (yellow card) 59'	Report	Jugas (yellow card) 58'; Álvarez (yellow card) 90+3'; Hanca (yellow card) 90+5'	Stadium: Stadion im. Henryka Reymana; Attendance: 25,317; Referee: Tomasz Kwiatkowski (Warsaw)

20 November 2021 15	Jagiellonia Białystok	3−1	Wisła Kraków	Białystok
15:00 UTC+1	Tabiś (yellow card) 17'; Augustyn (yellow card) 24', (goal) 41'; Černych (yellow card) 34'; Nastić (yellow card) 54'; Přikryl 59'; Țîru (yellow card) 76'; Żyro 87'	Report	Frydrych (red card) 9'; Szota 45+1'; Młyński (yellow card) 67'; Forbes (yellow card) 79'; Szot (yellow card) 85'	Stadium: Stadion Jagiellonii; Attendance: 5,411; Referee: Szymon Marciniak (Płock)

26 November 2021 16	Wisła Kraków	0−1	Radomiak Radom	Kraków
20:30 UTC+1	Kuveljić (yellow card) 57'	Report	Angielski 6' (pen.); Abramowicz (yellow card) 63'; Karwot (yellow card) 87'	Stadium: Stadion im. Henryka Reymana; Attendance: 10,150; Referee: Damian Sylwestrzak (Wrocław)

6 December 2021 17	Warta Poznań	1−1	Wisła Kraków	Grodzisk Wielkopolski
18:00 UTC+1	Zreľák 66'	Report	Frydrych 90+3'	Stadium: Stadion Dyskobolii Grodzisk Wielkopolski; Attendance: 1,088; Referee: Paweł Raczkowski (Warsaw)

11 December 2021 18	Zagłębie Lubin	2−1	Wisła Kraków	Lubin
17:30 UTC+1	Żubrowski (yellow card) 19'; Pantić (yellow card) 29'; Wójcicki (yellow card) 47'; Živec 74'; Dudziński (yellow card) 80'; Szysz 84'; Poręba (yellow card) 90'	Report	Frydrych (red card) 23'; Zhukov (yellow card) 44'; Gruszkowski 45'; Plewka (yellow card) 56'; El Mahdioui (yellow card) 87'	Stadium: Stadion Zagłębia; Attendance: 1,425; Referee: Zbigniew Dobrynin (Łódź)

17 December 2021 19	Wisła Kraków	3−0	Bruk-Bet Termalica Nieciecza	Kraków
18:00 UTC+1	El Mahdioui 23'; Yeboah 44'; Škvarka 47'; Kliment (yellow card) 52'; Szota (yellow card) 90+1'	Report	Jovanović (yellow card) 45+1'; Putivtsev (yellow card) 50'	Stadium: Stadion im. Henryka Reymana; Attendance: 9,007; Referee: Piotr Lasyk (Bytom)

6 February 2022 20	Raków Częstochowa	2−0	Wisła Kraków	Częstochowa
15:00 UTC+1	Tudor 55' (pen.); Wdowiak 74'	Report	Hanousek (yellow card) 47'; Ring (yellow card) 77'	Stadium: Miejski Stadion Piłkarski Raków; Attendance: 3,823; Referee: Szymon Marciniak (Płock)

12 February 2022 21	Wisła Kraków	0−1	Stal Mielec	Kraków
15:00 UTC+1	Fazlagikj (yellow card) 37'; Gruszkowski (yellow card) 84'	Report	Tomasiewicz 11'; Kasperkiewicz (yellow card) 30'; Hinokio (yellow card) 55'	Stadium: Stadion im. Henryka Reymana; Attendance: 11,484; Referee: Tomasz Kwiatkowski (Warsaw)

21 February 2022 22	Wisła Kraków	0−0	Górnik Łęczna	Kraków
18:00 UTC+1	Fazlagikj (yellow card) 75'	Report	Krykun (yellow card) 27'	Stadium: Stadion im. Henryka Reymana; Attendance: 10,269; Referee: Damian Kos (Wejherowo)

25 February 2022 23	Legia Warszawa	2–1	Wisła Kraków	Warsaw
20:30 UTC+1	Pekhart 8'; Josué (yellow card) 85'; Wieteska 90+4'	Report	Colley (yellow card) 35'; Hufi (yellow card) 77'; Gruszkowski 79'; Frydrych (yellow card) 90+5' (red card) 90+10'	Stadium: Stadion Wojska Polskiego; Attendance: 14,612; Referee: Piotr Lasyk (Bytom)

5 March 2022 24	Lechia Gdańsk	1−1	Wisła Kraków	Gdańsk
20:00 UTC+1	Maloča (yellow card) 27'; Zwoliński 36'; Kubicki (yellow card) 82'; Ceesay (yellow card) 88'	Report	Colley (yellow card) 50'; Fernández 89'	Stadium: Polsat Plus Arena Gdańsk; Attendance: 6,198; Referee: Paweł Raczkowski (Warsaw)

13 March 2022 25	Wisła Kraków	1−1	Lech Poznań	Kraków
17:30 UTC+1	Fernández (yellow card) 31'; Ondrášek 43'; Cissé (yellow card) 45+4'	Report	Skóraś (yellow card) 4'; Kownacki (yellow card) 27'; Milić 90+7'	Stadium: Stadion im. Henryka Reymana; Attendance: 21,068; Referee: Tomasz Kwiatkowski (Warsaw)

18 March 2022 26	Pogoń Szczecin	4−1	Wisła Kraków	Szczecin
20:30 UTC+1	Colley 19' (o.g.); Mata (yellow card) 34'; Drygas 43'; Parzyszek (yellow card) 45+1'; Gruszkowski 69' (o.g.); Kucharczyk 90+3'	Report	Fernández 30'; Fazlagikj (yellow card) 83'	Stadium: Stadion im. Floriana Krygiera; Attendance: 8,874; Referee: Damian Sylwestrzak (Wrocław)

3 April 2022 27	Wisła Kraków	2−2	Piast Gliwice	Kraków
17:30 UTC+2	Colley (yellow card) 4'; Savić 31'; Hugi 71'	Report	Huk (yellow card) 23'; Wilczek 51' (pen.), 61'; Czerwiński (yellow card) 70'	Stadium: Stadion im. Henryka Reymana; Attendance: 12,007; Referee: Szymon Marciniak (Płock)

10 April 2022 28	Wisła Kraków	4−1	Górnik Zabrze	Kraków
15:00 UTC+2	Fazlagikj (yellow card) 24'; Krawczyk 43' (o.g.); Savić 67'; Manu (yellow card) 69'; Fernández 75' (pen.); Kieszek (yellow card) 88'; Kuveljić 90+3'	Report	Podolski 51'; Janža (yellow card) 82'	Stadium: Stadion im. Henryka Reymana; Attendance: 17,135; Referee: Daniel Stefański (Bydgoszcz)

18 April 2022 29	Śląsk Wrocław	1−1	Wisła Kraków	Wrocław
15:00 UTC+2	Quintana 41'	Report	Manu 6'; Poletanović (yellow card) 24'; Gruszkowski (yellow card) 34'	Stadium: Stadion Wrocław; Attendance: 7,291; Referee: Szymon Marciniak (Płock)

25 April 2022 30	Wisła Kraków	3−4	Wisła Płock	Kraków
19:00 UTC+2	Gruszkowski (yellow card) 24'; Ring 27'; Manu 57', (yellow card) 90+9'; Ondrášek (yellow card) 66', (goal) 71'; Sadlok (yellow card) 74'	Report	Tomasik 9', (yellow card) 66'; Sekulski 12', 41'; Szwoch 90+11' (pen.)	Stadium: Stadion im. Henryka Reymana; Attendance: 12,776; Referee: Damian Sylwestrzak (Wrocław)

1 May 2022 31	Cracovia	0−0	Wisła Kraków	Kraków
17:30 UTC+2	Ghiță (yellow card) 60'; Pestka (yellow card) 84'	Report	Tsitaishvili (yellow card) 43'	Stadium: Stadion im. Józefa Piłsudskiego; Attendance: 14,191; Referee: Paweł Raczkowski (Warsaw)

7 May 2022 32	Wisła Kraków	0−0	Jagiellonia Białystok	Kraków
20:00 UTC+2		Report	Nastić (yellow card) 33'; Carioca (yellow card) 41'; Tabiś (yellow card) 49'	Stadium: Stadion im. Henryka Reymana; Attendance: 18,198; Referee: Daniel Stefański (Bydgoszcz)

15 May 2022 33	Radomiak Radom	4−2	Wisła Kraków	Radom
17:30 UTC+2	Angielski 50', 67', 68'; Cichocki (yellow card) 73'; Nascimento (yellow card) 83'; Abramowicz 86'	Report	Tsitaishvili 8'; Savić 48'	Stadium: Stadion Lekkoatletyczno-Piłkarski im. Marszałka Józefa Piłsudskiego; Attendance: 4,304; Referee: Jarosław Przybył (Kluczbork)

21 May 2022 34	Wisła Kraków	0−1	Warta Poznań	Kraków
17:30 UTC+2	Fazlagikj (yellow card) 70'; Sadlok (yellow card) 90'	Report	Mäenpää (yellow card) 27'; Szczepański 29'; Papeau (yellow card) 86'	Stadium: Stadion im. Henryka Reymana; Attendance: 15,117; Referee: Piotr Lasyk (Bytom)

=== Polish Cup ===
22 September 2021 Round 1	Stal Mielec	1−3	Wisła Kraków	Mielec
20:30 UTC+2	Kościelny (red card) 27'; Kliment 69' (o.g.)	Report	Młyński 20'; Szota 24'; Yebiah (yellow card) 68', (goal) 73' (pen.)	Stadium: Stadion MOSiR; Attendance: 1,410; Referee: Łukasz Szczech (Warsaw)

3 November 2021 Round 2	GKS Tychy	1−3	Wisła Kraków	Tychy
13:30 UTC+1	Nedić (yellow card) 13'; Wołkowicz (yellow card) 18'; Grzeszczyk 55'	Report	Młyński 24'; Forbes 74', 76'	Stadium: Stadion Miejski; Attendance: 3,596; Referee: Paweł Pskit (Łódź)

2 December 2021 Round of 16	Widzew Łódź	1−3	Wisła Kraków	Łódź
20:00 UTC+1	Kun 29'; Stępiński (yellow card) 36'	Report	Zhukov (yellow card) 48'; Sadlok (yellow card) 60'; Forbes 64'; Kliment 87', 90+7'; Gruszkowski (yellow card) 90'; Škvarka (yellow card) 90+6'	Stadium: Stadion Miejski Widzewa; Attendance: 15,627; Referee: Paweł Raczkowski (Warsaw)

1 March 2022 Quarterfinal	Olimpia Grudziądz	1−1 (a.e.t.) (5−3 p)	Wisła Kraków	Grudziądz
18:00 UTC+1	Bojas 2'; Kaczmarek (yellow card) 21'; Warcholak (yellow card) 96'	Report	Młyński (yellow card) 42'; Cissé (yellow card) 55', (goal) 57'; Fernández (yellow card) 68'; Colley (yellow card) 81'; Szot (yellow card) 91'	Stadium: Bronisław Malinowski Stadium; Attendance: 2,500; Referee: Dominik Sulikowski (Gdańsk)
	Penalties
	Warcholak (penalty scored); Cywiński (penalty scored); Wicki (penalty scored); Cabrera (penalty scored); Zawada (penalty scored)		(penalty scored) Sadlok; (penalty missed) Škvarka; (penalty scored) Poletanović; (penalty scored) Fazlagikj

== Squad and statistics ==
=== Appearances, goals and discipline ===
As of match played 21 May 2022

No.	Pos.	Nat	Name	Total		Ekstraklasa		Polish Cup		Discipline	
No.	Pos.	Nat	Name	Apps	Goals	Apps	Goals	Apps	Goals	Yellow card	Red card
1	GK	(Poland) POL	Paweł Kieszek	15	0	14	0	1	0	2	0
3	DF	(Sweden) SWE	Sebastian Ring	6	1	3+3	1	0	0	1	0
4	DF	(Poland) POL	Maciej Sadlok	24	1	16+4	1	4	0	6	0
5	DF	(Sweden) SWE	Joseph Colley	12	0	11	0	1	0	4	0
6	DF	(Poland) POL	Alan Uryga	3	0	3	0	0	0	0	0
7	MF	(Israel) ISR	Dor Hugi	31	1	6+22	1	2+1	0	1	0
8	MF	(Serbia) SRB	Marko Poletanović	11	0	10	0	0+1	0	1	0
9	FW	(Czech Republic) CZE	Jan Kliment	25	3	15+7	1	2+1	2	3	0
10	MF	(Kazakhstan) KAZ	Georgy Zhukov	21	1	12+6	1	2+1	0	4	0
11	MF	(Poland) POL	Mateusz Młyński	27	3	12+11	1	3+1	2	4	0
13	FW	(Czech Republic) CZE	Zdeněk Ondrášek	14	2	10+4	2	0	0	0	0
14	MF	(Georgia (country)) GEO	Heorhiy Tsitaishvili	7	1	6+1	1	0	0	1	0
15	DF	(Czech Republic) CZE	Matěj Hanousek	35	0	31	0	4	0	1	0
16	MF	(Poland) POL	Jakub Błaszczykowski	2	0	0+2	0	0	0	0	0
17	DF	(Poland) POL	Serafin Szota	17	2	12+3	1	2	1	3	1
20	DF	(Poland) POL	Konrad Gruszkowski	32	2	28+2	2	1+1	0	9	0
21	MF	(Serbia) SRB	Nikola Kuveljić	18	1	4+13	1	1	0	1	0
22	MF	(North Macedonia) MKD	Enis Fazlagikj	14	0	11+2	0	1	0	5	0
25	DF	(Czech Republic) CZE	Michal Frydrych	33	4	31	4	1+1	0	4	3
28	MF	(Netherlands) NED	Elvis Manu	11	2	5+6	2	0	0	2	0
30	FW	(Spain) ESP	Luis Fernández	10	3	6+3	3	1	0	2	0
31	GK	(Poland) POL	Mikołaj Biegański	22	0	19	0	3	0	0	0
35	MF	(Poland) POL	Dorian Gądek	0	0	0	0	0	0	0	0
43	DF	(Poland) POL	Dawid Szot	16	0	6+6	0	3+1	0	3	0
54	MF	(Poland) POL	Piotr Starzyński	22	0	6+12	0	2+2	0	0	0
70	MF	(Guinea) GUI	Momo Cissé	9	1	4+4	0	0+1	1	2	0
77	MF	(Austria) AUT	Stefan Savić	27	3	16+9	3	1+1	0	1	0
80	MF	(Poland) POL	Patryk Plewka	19	0	12+5	0	1+1	0	2	0
92	MF	(Slovakia) SVK	Michal Škvarka	32	2	22+6	2	2+2	0	2	0
99	GK	(Poland) POL	Kacper Rosa	0	0	0	0	0	0	0	0
Players transferred or loaned out during the season
1	GK	(Poland) POL	Mateusz Lis	1	0	1	0	0	0	0	0
2	DF	(Poland) POL	Krystian Wachowiak	2	0	0+1	0	0+1	0	0	0
3	DF	(Bosnia and Herzegovina) BIH	Adi Mehremić	0	0	0	0	0	0	0	0
8	MF	(Netherlands) NED	Aschraf El Mahdioui	18	1	16	1	2	0	6	0
19	FW	(Poland) POL	Hubert Sobol	8	0	0+7	0	0+1	0	1	0
22	GK	(Poland) POL	Michał Buchalik	0	0	0	0	0	0	0	0
32	DF	(Poland) POL	Paweł Koncewicz-Żyłka	0	0	0	0	0	0	0	0
40	MF	(Ghana) GHA	Yaw Yeboah	22	6	17+2	5	3	1	2	0
59	FW	(Poland) POL	Przemysław Zdybowicz	0	0	0	0	0	0	0	0
91	FW	(Costa Rica) CRC	Felicio Brown Forbes	20	5	9+9	2	1+1	3	5	0

=== Goalscorers ===
As of match played 21 May 2022

Rank	Pos.	Nat	No.	Player	Ekstraklasa	Polish Cup	Total
1	MF	(Ghana)	40	Yaw Yeboah	5	1	6
2	FW	(Costa Rica)	91	Felicio Brown Forbes	2	3	5
3	FW	(Czech Republic)	9	Jan Kliment	2	2	4
3	DF	(Czech Republic)	25	Michal Frydrych	4	0	4
5	MF	(Poland)	11	Mateusz Młyński	1	2	3
5	FW	(Spain)	30	Luis Fernández	3	0	3
5	MF	(Austria)	77	Stefan Savić	3	0	3
8	FW	(Czech Republic)	13	Zdeněk Ondrášek	2	0	2
8	DF	(Poland)	17	Serafin Szota	1	1	2
8	DF	(Poland)	20	Konrad Gruszkowski	2	0	2
8	MF	(Netherlands)	28	Elvis Manu	2	0	2
8	MF	(Slovakia)	92	Michal Škvarka	2	0	2
13	DF	(Sweden)	3	Sebastian Ring	1	0	1
13	DF	(Poland)	4	Maciej Sadlok	1	0	1
13	MF	(Israel)	7	Dor Hugi	1	0	1
13	MF	(Netherlands)	8	Aschraf El Mahdioui	1	0	1
13	MF	(Kazakhstan)	10	Georgy Zhukov	1	0	1
13	MF	(Georgia (country))	14	Heorhiy Tsitaishvili	1	0	1
13	MF	(Serbia)	21	Nikola Kuveljić	1	0	1
13	MF	(Guinea)	70	Momo Cissé	0	1	1
				Own goal	1	0	1
TOTALS					35	10	45

=== Assists ===
As of match played 21 May 2022

Rank	Pos.	Nat	No.	Player	Ekstraklasa	Polish Cup	Total
1	DF	(Czech Republic)	15	Matěj Hanousek	5	0	5
2	MF	(Israel)	7	Dor Hugi	4	0	4
2	MF	(Austria)	77	Stefan Savić	4	0	4
2	MF	(Slovakia)	92	Michal Škvarka	4	0	4
5	MF	(Georgia (country))	14	Heorhiy Tsitaishvili	2	0	2
5	DF	(Poland)	20	Konrad Gruszkowski	3	0	3
7	MF	(Serbia)	8	Marko Poletanović	1	0	1
7	FW	(Czech Republic)	9	Jan Kliment	1	0	1
7	DF	(Czech Republic)	25	Michal Frydrych	1	0	1
7	MF	(Netherlands)	28	Elvis Manu	1	0	1
7	MF	(Ghana)	40	Yaw Yeboah	1	0	1
TOTALS					27	0	27

=== Disciplinary record ===
No.	Pos.	Nat	Name	Ekstraklasa			Polish Cup			Total			Notes
No.	Pos.	Nat	Name	Yellow card	Second yellow card	Red card	Yellow card	Second yellow card	Red card	Yellow card	Second yellow card	Red card	Notes
1	GK	(Poland)	Paweł Kieszek	2						2			
3	DF	(Sweden)	Sebastian Ring	1						1			
4	DF	(Poland)	Maciej Sadlok	5			1			6			
5	DF	(Sweden)	Joseph Colley	3			1			4			
7	MF	(Israel)	Dor Hugi	1						1			
8	MF	(Serbia)	Marko Poletanović	1						1			
8	MF	(Netherlands)	Aschraf El Mahdioui	6						6			
9	FW	(Czech Republic)	Jan Kliment	3						3			
10	MF	(Kazakhstan)	Georgy Zhukov	3			1			4			
11	MF	(Poland)	Mateusz Młyński	3			1			4			
13	FW	(Czech Republic)	Zdeněk Ondrášek	1						1			
14	MF	(Georgia (country))	Heorhiy Tsitaishvili	1						1			
15	DF	(Czech Republic)	Matěj Hanousek	1						1			
17	DF	(Poland)	Serafin Szota	3	1					3	1		
19	FW	(Poland)	Hubert Sobol	1						1			
20	DF	(Poland)	Konrad Gruszkowski	8			1			9			
21	MF	(Serbia)	Nikola Kuveljić	1						1			
22	MF	(North Macedonia)	Enis Fazlagikj	5						5			
25	DF	(Czech Republic)	Michal Frydrych	3		3				3		3	
28	MF	(Netherlands)	Elvis Manu	2						2			
30	FW	(Spain)	Luis Fernández	1			1			2			
40	MF	(Ghana)	Yaw Yeboah	1			1			2			
43	DF	(Poland)	Dawid Szot	2			1			3			
70	MF	(Guinea)	Momo Cissé	1			1			2			
77	MF	(Austria)	Stefan Savić	1						1			
80	MF	(Poland)	Patryk Plewka	2						2			
91	FW	(Costa Rica)	Felicio Brown Forbes	5						5			
92	MF	(Slovakia)	Michal Škvarka	1			1			2			

Last updated: 21 May 2022
Source: Competitive matches
Only competitive matches
(yellow card) = Number of bookings; (second yellow card) = Number of sending offs after a second yellow card; (red card) = Number of sending offs by a direct red card.
