= 2018–19 Wisła Kraków season =

Wisła Kraków
2018–19 season
- Chairman: Rafał Wisłocki (from 4 January 2019); Marzena Sarapata (until 22 December 2018)
- Manager(s): Maciej Stolarczyk
- Ekstraklasa: 9th
- Polish Cup: 1st Round
- Henryk Reyman Cup: Winner
- Top goalscorer: League: Zdeněk Ondrášek, Marko Kolar (11 goals); All: Zdeněk Ondrášek (12 goals)
- Highest home attendance: 33,000 (31 March vs Legia Warsaw, Ekstraklasa)
- Lowest home attendance: 6,237 (25 September vs Lechia Gdańsk, Polish Cup)
- Average home league attendance: 15,640
Home colours	Away colours	Third colours

The 2018–19 Wisła Kraków season is the 79th season in the Ekstraklasa and the 65th season in the Polish Cup.

== Sponsors ==
Main Sponsor

(Poland) LV Bet

Kit manufacturer

(Germany) Adidas

Last updated: 1 July 2017.
Source: Wisła Kraków

== Transfers ==
=== Summer transfer window ===
==== Arrivals ====
- The following players moved to Wisła.

	Name	Position	Transfer type	Previous club	Fee	Ref.
	Transfer					
Substituted on	(Poland) Mateusz Lis	Goalkeeper	1 July 2018	(Poland) Raków Częstochowa	€125,000	
Substituted on	(Poland) Dawid Kort	Midfielder	1 July 2018	(Poland) Pogoń Szczecin	Free	
Substituted on	(Poland) Riccardo Grym	Midfielder	1 July 2018	(Germany) Borussia Mönchengladbach U19	Free	
Substituted on	(Poland) Marcin Grabowski	Defender	1 July 2018	(Poland) Lech Poznań II	Free	
Substituted on	(Poland) Maciej Śliwa	Midfielder	18 July 2018	(Poland) Wisła Kraków U19	Free	
	Return from loan spell					
Substituted on	(Poland) Rafał Pietrzak	Defender	1 July 2018	(Poland) Zagłębie Lubin	Free	
Substituted on	(Poland) Jakub Bartosz	Defender	1 July 2018	(Poland) Sandecja Nowy Sącz	Free	

==== Departures ====
- The following players moved from Wisła.

	Name	Position	Transfer type	New club	Fee	Ref.
	Transfer					
Substituted off	(Spain) Pol Llonch	Midfielder	1 July 2018	(Netherlands) Willem II Tilburg	Free	
Substituted off	(Poland) Tomasz Cywka	Defender	1 July 2018	(Poland) Lech Poznań	Free	
Substituted off	(Spain) Carlitos	Forward	5 July 2018	(Poland) Legia Warsaw	€450,000	
Substituted off	(Spain) Julián Cuesta	Goalkeeper	11 July 2018	(Greece) Aris Thessaloniki	Free	
Substituted off	(Spain) Iván González	Defender	18 July 2018	(Spain) Recreativo de Huelva	Free	
Substituted off	(Spain) Fran Vélez	Defender	25 July 2018	(Greece) Aris Thessaloniki	Free	
Substituted off	(Serbia) Nikola Mitrović	Midfielder	10 August 2018	(Azerbaijan) Keşla FK	Free	
Substituted off	(Poland) Riccardo Grym	Midfielder	31 August 2018	(Poland) Wisła Płock	Free	
	On loan					
Substituted off	(Ukraine) Denys Balanyuk	Forward	1 July 2018	(Ukraine) FC Arsenal Kyiv	Free	
Substituted off	(Poland) Kacper Chorążka	Goalkeeper	1 August 2018	(Poland) Raków Częstochowa	Free	
Substituted off	(Poland) Patryk Małecki	Midfielder	1 September 2018	(Slovakia) FC Spartak Trnava	Free	
	End of the loan					
Substituted off	(Croatia) Petar Brlek	Midfielder	1 July 2018	(Italy) Genoa CFC	Free	

=== Winter transfer window ===
==== Arrivals ====
- The following players moved to Wisła.

	Name	Position	Transfer type	Previous club	Fee	Ref.
	Transfer					
Substituted on	(Poland) Tobiasz Weinzettel	Goalkeeper	25 March 2019	(Poland) Odra Opole	Free	
Substituted on	(Poland) Jakub Błaszczykowski	Midfielder	7 February 2019	(Germany) VfL Wolfsburg	Free	
Substituted on	(Montenegro) Vukan Savićević	Midfielder	31 January 2019	(Slovakia) ŠK Slovan Bratislava	Free	
Substituted on	(Poland) Lukas Klemenz	Defender	21 January 2019	(Poland) Jagiellonia Białystok	Free	
Substituted on	(Poland) Łukasz Burliga	Defender	22 January 2019	(Poland) Jagiellonia Białystok	Free	
	Return from loan spell					
Substituted on	(Poland) Krzysztof Drzazga	Forward	10 January 2019	(Poland) Puszcza Niepołomice	Free	
Substituted on	(Poland) Kacper Chorążka	Goalkeeper	9 January 2019	(Poland) Raków Częstochowa	Free	
Substituted on	(Poland) Wojciech Słomka	Forward	9 January 2019	(Poland) GKS Katowice	Free	
	In on loan					
Substituted on	(Poland) Sławomir Peszko	Midfielder	25 January 2019	(Poland) Lechia Gdańsk	Free	
Substituted on	(Ghana) Emmanuel Kumah	Midfielder	22 February 2019	(Ghana) Tudu Mighty Jets FC	Free	

==== Departures ====
- The following players moved from Wisła.

	Name	Position	Transfer type	New club	Fee	Ref.
	Transfer					
Substituted off	(Czech Republic) Zdeněk Ondrášek	Forward	1 January 2019	(United States) FC Dallas	Free	
Substituted off	(Poland) Dawid Kort	Midfielder	8 January 2019	(Greece) Atromitos FC	Free	
Substituted off	(Poland) Jakub Bartkowski	Defender	11 January 2019	(Poland) Pogoń Szczecin	Free	
Substituted off	(Croatia) Zoran Arsenić	Defender	16 January 2019	(Poland) Jagiellonia Białystok	Free	
Substituted off	(Spain) Jesús Imaz	Midfielder	21 January 2019	(Poland) Jagiellonia Białystok	€300,000	
Substituted off	(Slovakia) Martin Košťál	Midfielder	21 January 2019	(Poland) Jagiellonia Białystok	€350,000	
Substituted off	(Croatia) Tibor Halilović	Midfielder	22 January 2019	(Croatia) HNK Rijeka	Free	

== Coaching staff ==
Coach	(Poland) Maciej Stolarczyk
Second Coach	(Poland) Radosław Sobolewski
Assistant Coach	(Poland) Mariusz Jop
Assistant Coach	(Poland) Kazimierz Kmiecik
Goalkeeping Coach	(Poland) Artur Łaciak
Trainer of Physical Preparation	(Poland) Wojciech Żuchowicz
Motor Fitness Trainer	(Poland) Daniel Michalczyk
Doctor	(Poland) Mariusz Urban
Masseur	(Poland) Zbigniew Woźniak
Physiotherapist	(Poland) Marcin Bisztyga
Team Manager	(Poland) Jarosław Krzoska
Analyst	(Poland) Mariusz Kondak
Dietician	(Poland) Rafał Baran (from 31 August 2018)

Last updated: 1 July 2018.
Source: Wisła Kraków

== Competitions ==
=== Preseason and friendlies ===
23 June 2018	Babia Góra Sucha Beskidzka (Poland)	0–9	(Poland) Wisła Kraków	Sucha Beskidzka, Poland
12:00 CEST (UTC+2)		Report	Małecki 7'; Serafin 21', 24'; Korczyk 29'; Bartosz 66'; Boguski 72'; Halilović 76'; Laskoś 79'; Bartkowski 86'	Stadium: Stadion Miejski; Referee: Mariusz Adamczyk (Wadowice)

27 June 2018	Wisła Kraków (Poland)	3–1	(Poland) Raków Częstochowa	Myślenice, Poland
16:30 CEST (UTC+2)	Ondrášek 32', 34'; Kort 80'	Report	Domański 43'	Stadium: Sport Myślenice; Referee: Paweł Kukla (Kraków)

30 June 2018	Wisła Kraków (Poland)	2–3	(Czech Republic) MFK Karviná	Myślenice, Poland
11:15 CEST (UTC+2)	Kort 57' (pen.); Imaz 75'	Report	Panák 7'; Budínský 50'; Šisler 73'	Stadium: Sport Myślenice; Referee: Grzegorz Jabłoński (Kraków)

4 July 2018	Wisła Kraków (Poland)	1–0	(Poland) Puszcza Niepołomice	Myślenice, Poland
16:30 CEST (UTC+2)	Pietrzak 80'	Report		Stadium: Sport Myślenice; Referee: Sebastian Krasny (Kraków)

7 July 2018 Henryk Reyman Cup	Wisła Kraków (Poland)	1–1 (5–4 p)	AS Monaco FC	Kraków, Poland
18:00 CEST (UTC+2)	Pietrzak 6'	Report	Isidor 60'	Stadium: Stadion Miejski; Attendance: 4,723; Referee: Tomasz Musiał (Kraków)
	Penalties
	Ondrášek (penalty scored); Kort (penalty scored); Boguski (penalty scored); Sadlok (penalty scored); Laskoś (penalty scored)		(penalty scored) Boschilia; (penalty scored) Navarro; (penalty scored) Mboula; (penalty scored) Diakhaby; (penalty missed) Touré

14 July 2018	Wisła Kraków (Poland)	1–2	(Slovakia) MŠK Žilina	Kalwaria Zebrzydowska, Poland
17:00 CEST (UTC+2)	Wasilewski 65'	Report	Cociuc 38' (pen.); Pietrzak 89' (o.g.)	Stadium: Ośrodek Sportu Kalwarianka; Referee: Łukasz Dragan (Wadowice)

11 August 2018	Wisła Kraków (Poland)	3–1	(Poland) Wisła Kraków U19	Myślenice, Poland
	Halilović 27' (pen.); Bartosz 45'; Kolar 84'	Report	Gruszkowski 14'	Stadium: Sport Myślenice

7 September 2018	Victoria 1918 Jaworzno (Poland)	1–5	(Poland) Wisła Kraków	Jaworzno, Poland
17:00 CEST (UTC+2)	Maziarz 4'	Report	Ondrášek 62', 73'; Wojtkowski 65'; Kolar 70', 84'	Stadium: Stadion Miejski Victoria; Attendance: 2,750; Referee: Andrzej Zawiślak (Sosnowiec)

12 October 2018	Bocheński KS (Poland)	2–5	(Poland) Wisła Kraków	Bochnia, Poland
15:30 CEST (UTC+2)	Bukowiec 7' (pen.); Szot 85'	Report	Brożek 4'; Wojtkowski 50'; Ondrášek 70'; Boguski 79'; Palčič 83'	Stadium: Stadion MOSiR; Attendance: 500; Referee: Tomasz Kubik (Bochnia)

16 November 2018	Zagłębie Sosnowiec (Poland)	1–3	(Poland) Wisła Kraków	Sosnowiec, Poland
12:00 CET (UTC+1)	Cristóvão 32'	Report	Kolar 4' (pen.); Palčič 68', 77'	Stadium: Stadion Ludowy; Referee: Rafał Rokosz (Katowice)

16 January 2019	Wisła Kraków (Poland)	3–2	(Poland) Wisła Sandomierz	Myślenice, Poland
13:30 CET (UTC+1)	Imaz 17'; Palčič 40'; Buksa 64'	Report	Kamiński 65'; Poński 82'	Stadium: Sport Myślenice; Referee: Sebastian Krasny (Kraków)

19 January 2019	Wisła Kraków (Poland)	2–3	(Poland) Garbarnia Kraków	Myślenice, Poland
12:00 CET (UTC+1)	Drzazga 9'; Wojtkowski 80'	Report	Serafin 45'; Krykun 50'; Wojcieszyński 66'	Stadium: Sport Myślenice; Referee: Sebastian Krasny (Kraków)

22 January 2019	Wisła Kraków (Poland)	2–3	(Poland) Puszcza Niepołomice	Myślenice, Poland
13:00 CET (UTC+1)	Kolar 37'; Buksa 52'	Report	Widejko 29'; Tomalski 67', 87'	Stadium: Sport Myślenice; Referee: Sebastian Krasny (Kraków)

26 January 2019	Vorskla Poltava U19 (Ukraine)	0–2	(Poland) Wisła Kraków	Kadriye, Turkey
9:00 CET (UTC+1)		Report	Buksa 67' (pen.); Morys 82'	Stadium: IC Hotels Football Center

27 January 2019	SFC Etar Veliko Tarnovo (Bulgaria)	1–1	(Poland) Wisła Kraków	Kemerağzı, Turkey
15:00 CET (UTC+1)	Sarmov 81'	Report	Kolar 16'	Stadium: Miracle Resort Hotel

2 February 2019	Wisła Kraków (Poland)	1–0	(Slovakia) MŠK Žilina	Myślenice, Poland
13:00 CET (UTC+1)	Peszko 22'	Report		Stadium: Sport Myślenice

21 March 2019	Odra Opole (Poland)	1–1	(Poland) Wisła Kraków	Opole, Poland
13:00 CET (UTC+1)	Martín 8'	Report	Brożek 42' (pen.)	Stadium: Stadion Miejski Odra

=== Ekstraklasa ===
==== Results summary ====
===== Regular season =====
Overall								Home						Away					
Pld	W	D	L	GF	GA	GD	Pts	W	D	L	GF	GA	GD	W	D	L	GF	GA	GD
30	12	6	12	55	48	+7	42	7	5	3	30	19	+11	5	1	9	25	29	−4

Last updated: 13 April 2019.
Source: 90minut

===== Relegation round =====
Overall								Home						Away					
Pld	W	D	L	GF	GA	GD	Pts	W	D	L	GF	GA	GD	W	D	L	GF	GA	GD
7	2	1	4	12	15	−3	7	1	1	2	8	9	−1	1	0	2	4	6	−2

Last updated: 18 May 2018.
Source: 90minut

==== Results by round ====
===== Regular season =====
Round	1	2	3	4	5	6	7	8	9	10	11	12	13	14	15	16	17	18	19	20	21	22	23	24	25	26	27	28	29	30
Ground	H	H	A	H	A	H	A	H	A	H	A	A	H	A	H	A	A	H	A	H	A	H	A	H	A	H	H	A	H	A
Result	D	W	L	D	W	W	W	W	L	L	W	D	D	L	W	L	L	D	W	L	L	W	L	L	W	W	W	L	D	L
Position	9	5	9	9	7	6	2	1	3	6	3	4	4	5	4	6	6	8	6	8	9	9	9	10	10	9	7	7	9	9

Updated to match(es) played on 13 April 2019. Source: 90minut
A = Away; H = Home; W = Win; D = Draw; L = Loss

===== Relegation round =====
Round	1	2	3	4	5	6	7
Ground	H	A	H	A	H	A	H
Result	L	L	D	W	W	L	L
Position	9	10	9	9	9	9	9

Updated to match(es) played on 18 May 2018. Source: 90minut
A = Away; H = Home; W = Win; D = Draw; L = Loss

==== Regular season ====
21 July 2018 1	Wisła Kraków	0–0	Arka Gdynia	Kraków
18:00 CEST (UTC+2)	Boguski (penalty missed) 64'	Report	Cvijanović (yellow card) 52'	Stadium: Stadion Miejski; Attendance: 9,215; Referee: Piotr Lasyk (Bytom)

27 July 2018 2	Wisła Kraków	2–1	Miedź Legnica	Kraków
20:30 CEST (UTC+2)	Bartkowski (yellow card) 24'; Basha (yellow card) 39'; Ondrášek 43'; Kort 49'; Imaz (yellow card) 54'; Sadlok (yellow card) 68'	Report	Santana (yellow card) 27'; Augustyniak (yellow card) 54'; Marquitos 69' (pen.), (yellow card) 85'	Stadium: Stadion Miejski; Attendance: 9,517; Referee: Wojciech Myć (Lublin)

5 August 2018 3	Jagiellonia Białystok	1–0	Wisła Kraków	Białystok
18:00 CEST (UTC+2)	Runje (yellow card) 45+1'; Novikovas 60'	Report	Buchalik (red card) 57'; Ondrášek (yellow card) 81'	Stadium: Stadion Miejski; Attendance: 12,373; Referee: Szymon Marciniak (Płock)

10 August 2018 4	Wisła Kraków	1–1	Wisła Płock	Kraków
20:30 CEST (UTC+2)	Boguski (yellow card) 18'; Ondrášek 33'; Basha (yellow card) 73'	Report	Furman (yellow card) 39'; Stępiński (yellow card) 57' (yellow-red card); Szymański (yellow card) 60'; Ricardinho 65'; Łasicki (yellow card) 88'	Stadium: Stadion Miejski; Attendance: 11,025; Referee: Daniel Stefański (Bydgoszcz)

19 August 2018 5	Lech Poznań	2–5	Wisła Kraków	Poznań
18:00 CEST (UTC+2)	Amaral 8', (yellow card) 58'; Gytkjær 18' (pen.); De Marco (yellow card) 46'; Tomczyk (yellow card) 85'; Răduț (yellow card) 90+1'	Report	Košťál 24'; Ondrášek 50', 61'; Gytkjær 55' (o.g.); Imaz (yellow card) 85'; Wasilewski (yellow card) 87'; Kolar 90'	Stadium: INEA Stadion; Attendance: 13,141; Referee: Paweł Raczkowski (Warsaw)

25 August 2018 6	Wisła Kraków	3–0	Górnik Zabrze	Kraków
20:30 CEST (UTC+2)	Pietrzak 18', (yellow card) 86'; Ondrášek 22'; Basha 49', (yellow card) 56'	Report	Matuszek (yellow card) 90+1'	Stadium: Stadion Miejski; Attendance: 16,482; Referee: Bartosz Frankowski (Toruń)

1 September 2018 7	Śląsk Wrocław	0–1	Wisła Kraków	Wrocław
18:00 CEST (UTC+2)	Cholewiak (yellow card) 53'; Chrapek (yellow card) 58'; Łobojko (yellow card) 66'; Piech (yellow card) 74'	Report	Kort (yellow card) 19'; Wojtkowski (yellow card) 85'; Ondrášek 90'; Boguski (yellow card) 90+5'	Stadium: Stadion Miejski; Attendance: 10,033; Referee: Zbigniew Dobrynin (Łódź)

15 September 2018 8	Wisła Kraków	5–2	Lechia Gdańsk	Kraków
20:30 CEST (UTC+2)	Ondrášek 19'; Bartkowski 45+1'; Boguski (yellow card) 62', (goal) 83'; Kort 64'; Košťál (yellow card) 67'; Wojtkowski 75'; Sadlok (penalty missed) 82'	Report	Lipski 7', (yellow card) 43'; Paixão 38' (pen.); Mladenović (yellow card) 50'	Stadium: Stadion Miejski; Attendance: 23,052; Referee: Paweł Gil (Lublin)

21 September 2018 9	Pogoń Szczecin	2–1	Wisła Kraków	Szczecin
18:00 CEST (UTC+2)	Buksa 14', 47', (yellow card) 38'; Drygas (yellow card) 26'; Kožulj (yellow card) 32'	Report	Košťál (yellow card) 49'; Bartkowski (yellow card) 56'; Pietrzak (yellow card) 71'; Imaz 82'; Ondrášek (yellow card) 87'; Basha (yellow card) 90'	Stadium: Stadion Miejski; Attendance: 3,750; Referee: Łukasz Szczech (Warsaw)

29 September 2018 10	Wisła Kraków	0–1	Korona Kielce	Kraków
20:30 CEST (UTC+2)	Arsenić (yellow card) 89'; Sadlok (yellow card) 90'; Wasilewski (yellow card) 90+3'	Report	Pučko 54', (yellow card) 86'; Gardawski (yellow card) 86'	Stadium: Stadion Miejski; Attendance: 11,104; Referee: Daniel Stefański (Bydgoszcz)

7 October 2018 11	KS Cracovia	0–2	Wisła Kraków	Kraków
18:00 CEST (UTC+2)	Gol (yellow card) 23'; Râpă (yellow card) 42'; Sipľak (yellow card) 62'; Airam (yellow card) 87'	Report	Imaz 19', 32'; Arsenić (yellow card) 58'	Stadium: Stadion Cracovii; Attendance: 5,123; Referee: Paweł Raczkowski (Warsaw)

21 October 2018 12	Legia Warsaw	3–3	Wisła Kraków	Warsaw
18:00 CEST (UTC+2)	Nagy 2'; Hloušek (yellow card) 14'; Carlitos 23', 90'; Szymański (yellow card) 45'; Kanté (yellow card) 82'; Kulenović (yellow card) 90+6'	Report	Wasilewski (yellow card) 17'; Imaz 57', 62'; Košťál 58'; Sadlok (yellow card) 69'; Pietrzak (yellow card) 90+3'; Bartkowski (yellow card) 90+4'	Stadium: Stadion Wojska Polskiego; Attendance: 26,363; Referee: Bartosz Frankowski (Toruń)

29 October 2018 13	Wisła Kraków	2–2	Zagłębie Sosnowiec	Kraków
18:00 CET (UTC+1)	Kort 45+4' (pen.); Imaz 81'	Report	Cristóvão 56', 85'	Stadium: Stadion Miejski; Attendance: 11,243; Referee: Tomasz Kwiatkowski (Warsaw)

2 November 2018 14	Piast Gliwice	2–0	Wisła Kraków	Gliwice
20:30 CET (UTC+1)	Dziczek 23'; Valencia (yellow card) 81'; Sokołowski 88'	Report	Sadlok (yellow card) 57'; Arsenić (yellow card) 86'; Imaz (yellow card) 90+1'	Stadium: Stadion Miejski; Attendance: 4,101; Referee: Szymon Marciniak (Płock)

10 November 2018 15	Wisła Kraków	3–2	Zagłębie Lubin	Kraków
20:30 CET (UTC+1)	Ondrášek 9'; Boguski 22'; Bartkowski (yellow card) 90+5'; Brożek 90+6'	Report	Starzyński 49' (pen.); Wasilewski 72' (o.g.); Tosik (yellow card) 73'; Mareš (yellow card) 77'	Stadium: Stadion Miejski; Attendance: 10,038; Referee: Krzysztof Jakubik (Siedlce)

26 November 2018 16	Arka Gdynia	4–1	Wisła Kraków	Gdynia
18:00 CET (UTC+1)	Aankour 15'; Zarandia 28', 89'; Jankowski 75'; Deja (yellow card) 87'	Report	Ondrášek 20'; Wasilewski (yellow card) 77'	Stadium: Stadion GOSiR; Attendance: 5,776; Referee: Daniel Stefański (Bydgoszcz)

1 December 2018 17	Miedź Legnica	2–0	Wisła Kraków	Legnica
18:00 CET (UTC+1)	Ojamaa 2', 12'	Report		Stadium: Stadion Miejski; Attendance: 4,339; Referee: Łukasz Szczech (Warsaw)

8 December 2018 18	Wisła Kraków	2–2	Jagiellonia Białystok	Kraków
20:30 CET (UTC+1)	Mitrović 17' (o.g.); Kolar 36'; Kort (yellow card) 45+2'; Ondrášek (yellow card) 90+5'	Report	Pospíšil (yellow card) 55'; Poletanović 61'; Sheridan 68'; Klemenz (yellow card) 90+1'	Stadium: Stadion Miejski; Attendance: 13,811; Referee: Tomasz Kwiatkowski (Warsaw)

14 December 2018 19	Wisła Płock	1–2	Wisła Kraków	Płock
18:00 CET (UTC+1)	Łasicki (yellow card) 14'; Merebashvili 48', (yellow card) 82'; Varela (yellow card) 54'	Report	Ondrášek 12' (pen.), 61', (yellow card) 83'	Stadium: Stadion im. Kazimierza Górskiego; Attendance: 1,951; Referee: Jarosław Przybył (Kluczbork)

21 December 2018 20	Wisła Kraków	0–1	Lech Poznań	Kraków
20:30 CET (UTC+1)		Report	Tiba 75'	Stadium: Stadion Miejski; Attendance: 22,491; Referee: Paweł Raczkowski (Warsaw)

11 February 2019 21	Górnik Zabrze	2–0	Wisła Kraków	Zabrze
18:00 CET (UTC+1)	Matras 10', 37'; Arnarson (yellow card) 16'; Bochniewicz (yellow card) 26'	Report	Palčič (yellow card) 84'	Stadium: Arena Zabrze; Attendance: 14,689; Referee: Jarosław Przybył (Kluczbork)

18 February 2019 22	Wisła Kraków	1–0	Śląsk Wrocław	Kraków
18:00 CET (UTC+1)	Basha (yellow card) 26'; Peszko (yellow card) 34'; Błaszczykowski 40' (pen.); Burliga (yellow card) 90+3'	Report	Mączyński (yellow card) 30'; Broź (yellow card) 47'; Ahmadzadeh (yellow card) 86'	Stadium: Stadion Miejski; Attendance: 21,289; Referee: Paweł Gil (Lublin)

23 February 2019 23	Lechia Gdańsk	1–0	Wisła Kraków	Gdańsk
20:30 CET (UTC+1)	Michalak (yellow card) 20'; Mladenović 41'; Mak (yellow card) 90+3'	Report	Sadlok (yellow card) 60'	Stadium: Stadion Energa; Attendance: 12,557; Referee: Tomasz Kwiatkowski (Warsaw)

3 March 2019 24	Wisła Kraków	2–3	Pogoń Szczecin	Kraków
15:30 CET (UTC+1)	Burliga (yellow card) 72'; Wasilewski (yellow card) 74'; Basha 87', 89'; Sadlok (yellow card) 90+9'	Report	Majewski 22'; Drygas 33' (pen.); Guarrotxena 50'; Fojut (yellow card) 90+9'	Stadium: Stadion Miejski; Attendance: 17,775; Referee: Szymon Marciniak (Płock)

9 March 2019 25	Korona Kielce	2–6	Wisła Kraków	Kielce
18:00 CET (UTC+1)	Arveladze 14', 29', (yellow card) 67'; Żubrowski (yellow card) 62'; Pučko (yellow card) 71'	Report	Burliga (yellow card) 13', (goal) 65'; Savićević (yellow card) 19', (goal) 55'; Peszko (yellow card) 25'; Błaszczykowski 37'; Drzazga 25', 51', 80'	Stadium: Kolporter Arena; Attendance: 9,644; Referee: Daniel Stefański (Bydgoszcz)

17 March 2019 26	Wisła Kraków	3–2	KS Cracovia	Kraków
18:00 CET (UTC+1)	Drzazga 14'; Kolar 19'; Błaszczykowski 59'; Basha (yellow card) 67'; Burliga (yellow card) 74'; Wasilewski (yellow card) 90+1'	Report	Râpă (yellow card) 35'; Wdowiak (yellow card) 74'; Airam 86'; Piszczek 90+4'	Stadium: Stadion Miejski; Attendance: 28,235; Referee: Tomasz Kwiatkowski (Warsaw)

31 March 2019 27	Wisła Kraków	4–0	Legia Warsaw	Kraków
18:00 CEST (UTC+2)	Peszko 5'; Błaszczykowski 41' (pen.); Pietrzak 73'; Kolar 82'	Report	Jędrzejczyk (yellow card) 72'	Stadium: Stadion Miejski; Attendance: 33,000; Referee: Bartosz Frankowski (Toruń)

3 April 2019 28	Zagłębie Sosnowiec	4–3	Wisła Kraków	Sosnowiec
20:30 CEST (UTC+2)	Udovičić 12', 50'; Gabedava 24'; Możdżeń (yellow card) 41', (goal) 85' (pen.)	Report	Kolar 28'; Peszko (yellow card) 47'; Burliga 51', (yellow card) 90'; Pietrzak 64' (pen.)	Stadium: Stadion Ludowy; Attendance: 4,296; Referee: Jarosław Przybył (Kluczbork)

6 April 2019 29	Wisła Kraków	2–2	Piast Gliwice	Kraków
18:00 CEST (UTC+2)	Sadlok (yellow card) 25'; Pietrzak (penalty missed) 34'; Palčič 35', 57'; Basha (yellow card) 51'	Report	Dziczek 19'; Papadopulos 79'	Stadium: Stadion Miejski; Attendance: 26,010; Referee: Szymon Marciniak (Płock)

13 April 2019 30	Zagłębie Lubin	3–1	Wisła Kraków	Lubin
18:00 CEST (UTC+2)	Tuszyński 14', 77'; Jagiełło 27'; Guldan (yellow card) 69'; Mucha (yellow card) 90+3'	Report	Klemenz (yellow card) 17'; Błaszczykowski 52'; Burliga (yellow card) 60'; Sadlok (yellow card) 66'	Stadium: Stadion Zagłębia Lubin; Attendance: 6,189; Referee: Paweł Raczkowski (Warsaw)

===== Relegation round =====
22 April 2019 31	Wisła Kraków	2–3	Wisła Płock	Kraków
15:30 CEST (UTC+2)	Peszko 31', 36'; Burliga (red card) 52'; Brożek (yellow card) 85'	Report	Angielski (yellow card) 34'; Szwoch 43'; Merebashvili (yellow card) 45+2'; Zawada 63', 70'; Rasak (yellow card) 74'	Stadium: Stadion Miejski; Attendance: 8,229; Referee: Piotr Lasyk (Bytom)

25 April 2019 32	Zagłębie Sosnowiec	2–1	Wisła Kraków	Sosnowiec
20:30 CEST (UTC+2)	Mráz (yellow card) 35'; Możdżeń 50'; Nowak 58'	Report	Drzazga 4', (yellow card) 53'; Kolar (yellow card) 45'	Stadium: Stadion Ludowy; Attendance: 3,048; Referee: Krzysztof Jakubik (Siedlce)

28 April 2019 33	Wisła Kraków	1–1	Śląsk Wrocław	Kraków
18:00 CEST (UTC+2)	Kolar 27'	Report	Robak 7'; Łabojko (yellow card) 46'; Chrapek (yellow card) 75'; Pawelec (yellow card) 85'; Celeban (yellow card) 90+1'	Stadium: Stadion Miejski; Attendance: 9,711; Referee: Tomasz Kwiatkowski (Warsaw)

3 May 2019 34	Górnik Zabrze	1–2	Wisła Kraków	Zabrze
20:30 CEST (UTC+2)	Sekulić (yellow card) 30'; Jiménez 37'	Report	Boguski (yellow card) 25'; Kolar 34' (pen.), 51', (yellow card) 49'; Grabowski (yellow card) 84'	Stadium: Arena Zabrze; Attendance: 17,210; Referee: Paweł Gil (Lublin)

10 May 2019 35	Wisła Kraków	1–0	Korona Kielce	Kraków
20:30 CEST (UTC+2)	Pietrzak (yellow card) 27'; Savićević (yellow card) 37'; Kolar 59' (pen.)	Report	Sewerzyński (yellow card) 6'; Gnjatić (yellow card) 8'; Márquez (yellow card) 38'; Rymaniak (yellow card) 58'; Sokół (yellow card) 58'; Żubrowski (yellow card) 83'	Stadium: Stadion Miejski; Attendance: 11,144; Referee: Daniel Stefański (Bydgoszcz)

13 May 2019 36	Arka Gdynia	3–1	Wisła Kraków	Gdynia
18:00 CEST (UTC+2)	Deja 5'; Zbozień (yellow card) 40'; Vejinović 58', 70' (pen.)	Report	Śliwa 40'; Grabowski (yellow card) 69'; Wojtkowski (yellow card) 90+1'; Savićević (yellow card) 90+1'	Stadium: Stadion GOSiR; Attendance: 7,602; Referee: Paweł Raczkowski (Warsaw)

18 May 2019 37	Wisła Kraków	4–5	Miedź Legnica	Kraków
15:30 CEST (UTC+2)	Wasilewski (yellow card) 20'; Klemenz (yellow card) 25'; Kolar 32', 90+7' (pen.); Savićević 55'; Brożek 78' (pen.); Wojtkowski (yellow card) 90+3'; Burliga (yellow card) 90+8'	Report	Forsell (penalty missed) 26'; Román 36' (pen.), 66'; Cámara 62', 68'; Dzhanayev (yellow card) 90+3'; Pikk (yellow card) 90+5'; Zieliński 90+10'	Stadium: Stadion Miejski; Attendance: 13,197; Referee: Tomasz Kwiatkowski (Warsaw)

=== Polish Cup ===
25 September 2018 1st Round	Wisła Kraków	1–1 (4–5 p)	Lechia Gdańsk	Kraków
20:30 CEST (UTC+2)	Ondrášek 60' (pen.), (red card) 95'; Arsenić (yellow card) 112'	Report	Nalepa 15'; Alomerović (yellow card) 59'; Haraslín (yellow card) 90+3'; Vitória (yellow card) 101'	Stadium: Stadion Miejski; Attendance: 6,237; Referee: Piotr Lasyk (Bytom)
	Penalties
	Brożek (penalty scored); Košťál (penalty scored); Pietrzak (penalty scored); Sadlok (penalty missed); Bartkowski (penalty scored)		(penalty scored) Paixão; (penalty scored) Haraslín; (penalty scored) Lipski; (penalty scored) Kubicki; (penalty scored) Mladenović

== Squad and statistics ==
=== Appearances, goals and discipline ===
As of Match played 18 May 2019

No.	Pos.	Name	Nat.	Ekstraklasa		Polish Cup		Total		Discipline	
No.	Pos.	Name	Nat.	Apps	Goals	Apps	Goals	Apps	Goals	Yellow card	Red card
1	GK	Mateusz Lis	(Poland)	33+2	0	0	0	35	0	0	0
22	GK	Michał Buchalik	(Poland)	4	0	1	0	5	0	0	1
2	DF	Rafał Pietrzak	(Poland)	35+1	3	1	0	37	3	4	0
4	DF	Maciej Sadlok	(Poland)	27	0	1	0	28	0	8	0
5	DF	Jakub Bartkowski	(Poland)	17+1	1	1	0	19	1	4	0
5	DF	Lukas Klemenz	(Poland)	8+2	0	0	0	10	0	2	0
8	DF	Łukasz Burliga	(Poland)	7+4	2	0	0	11	2	7	1
15	DF	Zoran Arsenić	(Croatia)	9+3	0	1	0	13	0	4	0
21	DF	Marcin Grabowski	(Poland)	5+3	0	0+1	0	9	0	2	0
27	DF	Marcin Wasilewski	(Poland)	28	0	0	0	28	0	7	0
29	DF	Matej Palčič	(Slovenia)	9+3	2	0	0	12	2	1	0
42	DF	Daniel Morys	(Poland)	1+0	0	0	0	1	0	0	0
43	DF	Dawid Szot	(Poland)	2+0	0	0	0	2	0	0	0
45	DF	Daniel Hoyo-Kowalski	(Poland)	4+0	0	0	0	4	0	0	0
7	MF	Dawid Kort	(Poland)	18+2	3	1	0	21	3	2	0
7	MF	Sławomir Peszko	(Poland)	14	3	0	0	14	3	3	0
8	MF	Tibor Halilović	(Croatia)	4+7	0	0	0	11	0	0	0
9	MF	Rafał Boguski	(Poland)	23+4	2	0+1	0	28	2	4	0
10	MF	Vullnet Basha	(Albania)	30	3	1	0	31	3	7	0
11	MF	Jesús Imaz	(Spain)	16+1	6	1	0	18	6	3	0
16	MF	Jakub Błaszczykowski	(Poland)	8	5	0	0	8	5	0	0
17	MF	Jakub Bartosz	(Poland)	1+7	0	0	0	8	0	0	0
26	MF	Kamil Wojtkowski	(Poland)	6+18	1	0	0	24	1	3	0
28	MF	Vukan Savićević	(Montenegro)	11+1	2	0	0	12	2	3	0
70	MF	Maciej Śliwa	(Poland)	1+4	1	0	0	5	1	0	0
77	MF	Martin Košťál	(Slovakia)	15+4	2	0+1	0	20	2	2	0
77	MF	Emmanuel Kumah	(Ghana)	0+4	0	0	0	4	0	0	0
80	MF	Patryk Plewka	(Poland)	8+10	0	1	0	19	0	0	0
88	MF	Patryk Małecki	(Poland)	4+1	0	0	0	5	0	0	0
98	MF	Wojciech Słomka	(Poland)	0+5	0	0	0	5	0	0	0
11	FW	Krzysztof Drzazga	(Poland)	16+1	5	0	0	17	5	1	0
14	FW	Artur Balicki	(Poland)	0+2	0	0	0	2	0	0	0
23	FW	Paweł Brożek	(Poland)	4+10	2	0+1	0	15	2	1	0
24	FW	Marko Kolar	(Croatia)	20+6	11	1	0	27	11	2	0
44	FW	Aleksander Buksa	(Poland)	0+4	0	0	0	4	0	0	0

=== Goalscorers ===
As of Match played 18 May 2019

Rank	Pos.	No.	Player	Ekstraklasa	Polish Cup	Total
1	FW	13	(Czech Republic) Zdeněk Ondrášek	11	1	12
2	FW	24	(Croatia) Marko Kolar	11	0	11
3	MF	11	(Spain) Jesús Imaz	6	0	6
4	FW	11	(Poland) Krzysztof Drzazga	5	0	5
4	MF	16	(Poland) Jakub Błaszczykowski	5	0	5
6	DF	2	(Poland) Rafał Pietrzak	3	0	3
6	MF	7	(Poland) Dawid Kort	3	0	3
6	MF	7	(Poland) Sławomir Peszko	3	0	3
6	MF	10	(Albania) Vullnet Basha	3	0	3
10	DF	8	(Poland) Łukasz Burliga	2	0	2
10	MF	9	(Poland) Rafał Boguski	2	0	2
10	FW	23	(Poland) Paweł Brożek	2	0	2
10	MF	28	(Montenegro) Vukan Savićević	2	0	2
10	DF	29	(Slovenia) Matej Palčič	2	0	2
10	MF	77	(Slovakia) Martin Košťál	2	0	2
16	DF	5	(Poland) Jakub Bartkowski	1	0	1
16	MF	26	(Poland) Kamil Wojtkowski	1	0	1
16	MF	70	(Poland) Maciej Śliwa	1	0	1
7	FW	o.g.	(Denmark) Christian Gytkjær	1	0	1
7	DF	o.g.	(Slovenia) Nemanja Mitrović	1	0	1
TOTALS				66	1	67

=== Assists ===
As of Match played 18 May 2019

Rank	Pos.	No.	Player	Ekstraklasa	Polish Cup	Total
1	MF	9	(Poland) Rafał Boguski	6	0	6
2	DF	2	(Poland) Rafał Pietrzak	5	0	5
2	MF	77	(Slovakia) Martin Košťál	5	0	5
4	MF	28	(Montenegro) Vukan Savićević	4	0	4
5	MF	7	(Poland) Sławomir Peszko	3	0	3
5	MF	10	(Albania) Vullnet Basha	3	0	3
5	MF	11	(Spain) Jesús Imaz	3	0	3
5	FW	11	(Poland) Krzysztof Drzazga	3	0	3
9	FW	13	(Czech Republic) Zdeněk Ondrášek	2	0	2
9	MF	16	(Poland) Jakub Błaszczykowski	2	0	2
9	FW	24	(Croatia) Marko Kolar	2	0	2
12	DF	4	(Poland) Maciej Sadlok	1	0	1
12	DF	5	(Poland) Jakub Bartkowski	1	0	1
12	MF	7	(Poland) Dawid Kort	1	0	1
12	DF	8	(Poland) Łukasz Burliga	1	0	1
12	FW	23	(Poland) Paweł Brożek	1	0	1
12	DF	27	(Poland) Marcin Wasilewski	1	0	1
12	DF	29	(Slovenia) Matej Palčič	1	0	1
12	MF	88	(Poland) Patryk Małecki	1	0	1
TOTALS				46	0	46

=== Disciplinary record ===
As of Match played 18 May 2019

No.	Pos.	Name	Ekstraklasa		Polish Cup		Total	
No.	Pos.	Name	Yellow card	Red card	Yellow card	Red card	Yellow card	Red card
2	DF	(Poland) Rafał Pietrzak	4	0	0	0	4	0
4	DF	(Poland) Maciej Sadlok	8	0	0	0	8	0
5	DF	(Poland) Jakub Bartkowski	4	0	0	0	4	0
5	DF	(Poland) Lukas Klemenz	2	0	0	0	2	0
7	MF	(Poland) Dawid Kort	2	0	0	0	2	0
7	MF	(Poland) Sławomir Peszko	3	0	0	0	3	0
8	DF	(Poland) Łukasz Burliga	7	1	0	0	7	1
9	MF	(Poland) Rafał Boguski	4	0	0	0	4	0
10	MF	(Albania) Vullnet Basha	7	0	0	0	7	0
11	MF	(Spain) Jesús Imaz	3	0	0	0	3	0
11	FW	(Poland) Krzysztof Drzazga	1	0	0	0	1	0
13	FW	(Czech Republic) Zdeněk Ondrášek	4	0	0	1	4	1
15	DF	(Croatia) Zoran Arsenić	3	0	1	0	4	0
21	DF	(Poland) Marcin Grabowski	2	0	0	0	2	0
22	GK	(Poland) Michał Buchalik	0	1	0	0	0	1
23	FW	(Poland) Paweł Brożek	1	0	0	0	1	0
24	FW	(Croatia) Marko Kolar	2	0	0	0	2	0
26	MF	(Poland) Kamil Wojtkowski	3	0	0	0	3	0
27	DF	(Poland) Marcin Wasilewski	7	0	0	0	7	0
28	MF	(Montenegro) Vukan Savićević	3	0	0	0	3	0
29	DF	(Slovenia) Matej Palčič	1	0	0	0	1	0
77	MF	(Slovakia) Martin Košťál	2	0	0	0	2	0

== Awards ==
=== Wisła Player of the Month award ===
Awarded monthly to the player that was chosen by fans voting on wislaportal.pl

Month	Player	Rate
July	(Poland) Michał Buchalik	6.76
August	(Czech Republic) Zdeněk Ondrášek	7.13
September	(Poland) Kamil Wojtkowski	5.49
October	(Spain) Jesús Imaz	7.86
November	(Spain) Jesús Imaz	4.80
December	(Poland) Marcin Wasilewski	6.72
February	(Poland) Jakub Błaszczykowski	5.69
March	(Albania) Vullnet Basha	8.21
April	(Montenegro) Vukan Savićević	6.30
May	(Poland) Daniel Hoyo-Kowalski	6.59
