= Rúben Dionísio =

Portuguese footballer

Personal information
- Full name: Rúben Alexandre Pires Dionísio
- Date of birth: 7 July 1995 (age 31)
- Place of birth: Cascais, Portugal
- Height: 1.78 m (5 ft 10 in)
- Position: Goalkeeper

Team information
- Current team: Olhanense
- Number: 1

Youth career
- 2003–2014: Estoril

Senior career*
Years	Team	Apps	(Gls)
2014–2016	Estoril	1	(0)
2016–2017	Almancilense	7	(0)
2017	Sintrense	0	(0)
2017	Oeiras		
2018–2019	Sacavenense	15	(0)
2019–	Olhanense	4	(0)
- * Club domestic league appearances and goals as of 12:14, 3 March 2020 (UTC)

Rúben Alexandre Pires Dionísio (born 7 July 1995) is a Portuguese professional footballer who plays as a goalkeeper for S.C. Olhanense.

== Career ==
Born in Cascais, Lisbon District, Dionisio signed his first professional contract for two years at G.D. Estoril Praia in June 2014. He made one appearance in Primeira Liga, playing the final three minutes of the season on 23 May 2015 in a 2–0 home win over Boavista F.C. after replacing Paweł Kieszek.

In July 2019, he was signed by S.C. Olhanense.
