= Enis Fazlagikj =

Macedonian footballer

Personal information
- Full name: Enis Fazlagikj; Енис Фазлагиќ
- Date of birth: 27 March 2000 (age 26)
- Place of birth: Veles, Macedonia
- Height: 1.88 m (6 ft 2 in)
- Position: Midfielder

Team information
- Current team: Vora
- Number: 22

Youth career
- –2015: Skopje
- 2015–2016: Shkëndija

Senior career*
| Years | Team | Apps | (Gls) |
| 2016–2018 | Shkëndija | 19 | (2) |
| 2018–2022 | Žilina | 68 | (1) |
| 2019–2021 | → Žilina B (loan) | 6 | (0) |
| 2022–2025 | Wisła Kraków | 15 | (0) |
| 2022–2023 | → DAC Dunajská Streda (loan) | 6 | (0) |
| 2024 | → Górnik Łęczna (loan) | 10 | (0) |
| 2025– | Vora | 25 | (0) |

International career
| 2015–2016 | Macedonia U16 | 5 | (2) |
| 2016 | Macedonia U17 | 3 | (1) |
| 2017–2018 | Macedonia U18 | 3 | (1) |
| 2017–2018 | Macedonia U19 | 11 | (1) |
| 2018–2022 | Macedonia U21 | 16 | (0) |
| 2022 | North Macedonia | 1 | (0) |
- * Club domestic league appearances and goals as of 13 May 2026

Enis Fazlagikj (Macedonian: Енис Фазлагиќ; Albanian: Enis Fazlagiç or Fazliaj; born 27 March 2000) is a Macedonian professional footballer who plays as a midfielder for Kategoria Superiore club Vora.

== Club career ==
=== MŠK Žilina ===
Fazlagikj made his Fortuna Liga debut for Žilina against Nitra on 28 July 2018. He appeared in the starting eleven of the home fixture and witnessed the entire duration of the 2–1 victory, following goals by Michal Škvarka and future Slovak international Róbert Boženík, despite an equalizer by Andrej Fábry.

Fazlagikj had to wait for his premier goal for over two years, reaching it in the last match of 2020 in a derby fixture at Tehelné pole against Slovan Bratislava. Fazlagikj equalized the score of the game in the 85th minute following a cross by Branislav Sluka, setting a score at 2–2. Rafael Ratão however grabbed three points for then-table leaders Slovan in the stoppage time, finalizing the score at 3–2.

=== Wisła Kraków ===
On 21 January 2022, it was announced Fazlagikj joined Polish Ekstraklasa club Wisła Kraków, signing a four-and-a-half-year deal.

==== Loan to DAC ====
On 18 August 2022, Fazlagikj returned to Slovakia to join DAC Dunajská Streda on a one-year loan, with an option for the Slovak side to buy him out at the end of his spell.

==== Loan to Górnik Łęczna ====
After returning from his loan spell in Slovakia, Fazlagikj did not make a single appearance for Wisła during the 2023–24 campaign. On 16 February 2024, he was sent on loan to fellow I liga club Górnik Łęczna until the end of the season.

On 17 April 2025, 32 months since his last competitive appearance for Wisła, Fazlagikj's contract was terminated by mutual consent.

=== Vora ===
On 3 July 2025, Fazlagikj signed with Albanian club Vora.

== Career statistics ==
=== International ===
Appearances and goals by national team and year
| National team | Year | Apps | Goals |
|---|---|---|---|
North Macedonia
| North Macedonia | 2022 | 1 | 0 |
| Total | | 1 | 0 |

== Honours ==
Shkëndija

- Macedonian First League: 2017–18
- Macedonian Cup: 2017–18
