= Felicio Brown Forbes =

Costa Rican footballer (born 1991)

Felicio Brown
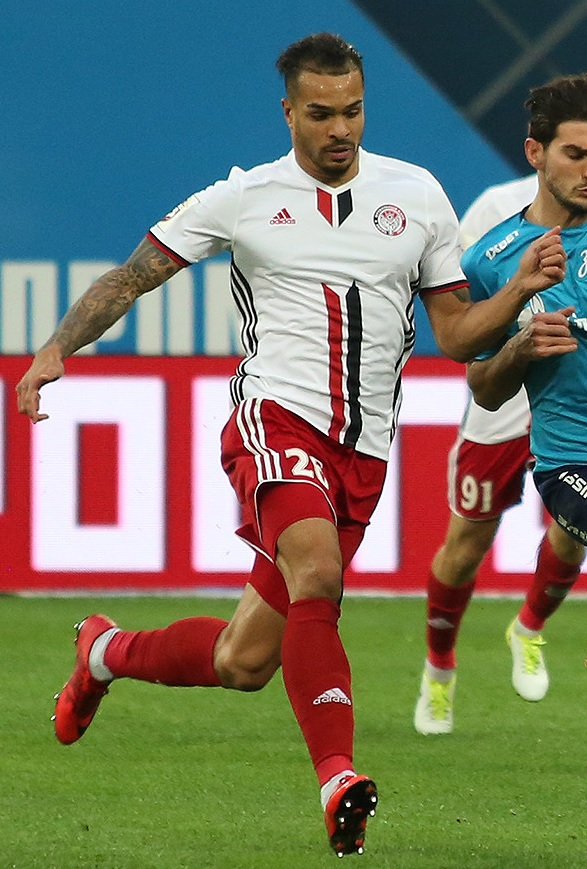
- Brown Forbes with Amkar Perm in 2018

Personal information
- Full name: Felicio Anando Brown Steinert
- Date of birth: 28 August 1991 (age 35)
- Place of birth: Berlin, Germany
- Height: 1.89 m (6 ft 2 in)
- Position: Striker

Team information
- Current team: Yanbian Longding
- Number: 10

Youth career
- 1999–2001: FV Wannsee
- 2001–2006: Lichterfelder FC
- 2006–2007: Hertha Zehlendorf
- 2008–2010: Hertha BSC

Senior career*
Years	Team	Apps	(Gls)
2010–2013	1. FC Nürnberg II	29	(7)
2010–2013	1. FC Nürnberg	17	(9)
2011	→ Carl Zeiss Jena (loan)	15	(9)
2011–2012	→ Rot-Weiß Oberhausen (loan)	34	(6)
2013	FSV Frankfurt II	11	(4)
2013–2014	Krylia Sovetov	15	(6)
2014–2015	Ufa	9	(1)
2015	Rostov	0	(0)
2016–2017	Arsenal Tula	22	(4)
2017	→ Anzhi Makhachkala (loan)	5	(1)
2017–2018	Amkar Perm	13	(4)
2018–2019	Korona Kielce	19	(7)
2019–2020	Raków Częstochowa	28	(14)
2020–2022	Wisła Kraków	40	(11)
2022	Wuhan Yangtze River	30	(12)
2023	Qingdao Hainiu	21	(7)
2024	East Bengal	11	(1)
2024	Muangthong United	14	(4)
2025–	Yanbian Longding	44	(26)

International career
2010	Germany U19	4	(0)
2011	Germany U20	1	(0)
2014–2021	Costa Rica	5	(0)
- * Club domestic league appearances and goals as of 00:44, 12 December 2025 (UTC)

Felicio Anando Brown Steinert (born 28 August 1991) is a professional footballer who plays as a striker for China League One club Yanbian Longding. Born in Germany, and having represented Germany at youth level, he represents the Costa Rica national team.

== Club career ==
Brown Forbes was born in Berlin, to a Costa Rican father and a German mother, and spent his first six years in Limón. He made his professional debut for FC Carl Zeiss Jena during the 2010–11 3. Liga season in a 1–1 home draw with VfB Stuttgart II.

In July 2014, Brown Forbes moved from Krylia Sovetov, signing a two-year contract with fellow Russian side FC Ufa.

On 24 February 2017, Forbes joined Anzhi Makhachkala on loan for the remainder of the 2016–17 season. On 11 September 2017, he signed with Amkar Perm.

On 20 July 2018, Brown Forbes joined Korona Kielce on a two-year deal. On 29 June 2019, Brown Forbes left Korona Kielce.

On 28 June 2019, Raków Częstochowa announced they had signed Brown Forbes on a one-year contract.

On 5 October 2020, he moved to another Ekstraklasa club Wisła Kraków. On 11 March 2022, he left the club by mutual consent.

On 28 April 2022, he joined Chinese Super League club Wuhan Yangtze River.

In February 2023, he joined Chinese Super League club Qingdao Hainiu.

On 1 February 2024, he joined Indian Super League club East Bengal.

== International career ==
Initially, Brown Forbes was willing to play internationally for Costa Rica, but he later was called to the youth teams of Germany, starting to prioritize his country of birth above his origins. However, because Germany has not called him for its national teams since 2011, Brown Forbes began to show signs of interest in playing international matches with Costa Rica. As of 12 September 2013, he highlighted the Costa Rican qualification for the 2014 FIFA World Cup on his Twitter account. In November 2013, Brown Forbes confirmed to the Costa Rican press that he wanted to play for Los Ticos.

== Career statistics ==
=== Club ===
As of match played 22 April 2025

Appearances and goals by club, season and competition
Club	Season	League			National cup (Note: Includes DFB-Pokal, Russian Cup, Polish Cup, Chinese FA Cup, Thai FA Cup)		Continental		Other		Total	
Club	Season	Division	Apps	Goals	Apps	Goals	Apps	Goals	Apps	Goals	Apps	Goals
1. FC Nürnberg II	2010–11	Regionalliga Süd	13	0	—		—		—		13	0
1. FC Nürnberg II	2012–13	Regionalliga Bayern	16	2	—		—		—		16	2
1. FC Nürnberg II	Total		29	2	0	0	0	0	0	0	29	2
Carl Zeiss Jena (loan)	2010–11	3. Liga	15	3	—		—		1 (Note: Appearance in Thuringian Cup)	0	16	3
Rot-Weiß Oberhausen (loan)	2011–12	3. Liga	34	6	1	0	—		—		35	6
FSV Frankfurt II	2012–13	Regionalliga Südwest	11	4	—		—		—		11	4
Krylia Sovetov Samara	2013–14	Russian Premier League	15	0	1	0	—		—		16	0
Ufa	2014–15	Russian Premier League	9	1	1	0	—		—		10	1
Rostov	2015–16	Russian Premier League	0	0	0	0	—		—		0	0
Arsenal Tula	2015–16	FNL	8	2	—		—		—		8	2
Arsenal Tula	2016–17	Russian Premier League	14	2	0	0	—		—		14	2
Arsenal Tula	Total		22	4	0	0	0	0	0	0	22	4
Anzhi Makhachkala (loan)	2016–17	Russian Premier League	5	1	—		—		—		5	1
Amkar Perm	2017–18	Russian Premier League	13	2	1	0	—		2 (Note: Appearances in Russian Premier League relegation play-offs)	0	16	2
Korona Kielce	2018–19	Ekstraklasa	19	3	1	0	—		—		20	3
Raków Częstochowa	2019–20	Ekstraklasa	27	10	2	2	—		—		29	12
Raków Częstochowa	2020–21	Ekstraklasa	1	0	0	0	—		—		1	0
Raków Częstochowa	Total		28	10	2	2	0	0	0	0	30	12
Wisła Kraków	2020–21	Ekstraklasa	22	7	0	0	—		—		22	7
Wisła Kraków	2021–22	Ekstraklasa	18	2	2	3	—		—		20	5
Wisła Kraków	Total		40	9	2	3	0	0	0	0	42	12
Wuhan Yangtze River	2022	Chinese Super League	30	12	0	0	—		—		30	12
Qingdao Hainiu	2023	Chinese Super League	21	7	2	0	—		—		23	7
East Bengal	2023–24	Indian Super League	11	1	0	0	—		—		11	1
Muangthong United	2024–25	Thai League 1	14	4	1	2	6 (Note: Appearances in AFC Champions League Two)	4	1 (Note: Appearance in Thai League Cup)	0	22	10
Yanbian Longding	2025	China League One	5	1	0	0	—		—		5	1
Career total			321	70	12	7	7	4	3	0	343	81
