= Dawid Kort =

Polish footballer

Personal information
- Date of birth: 29 April 1995 (age 31)
- Place of birth: Szczecin, Poland
- Height: 1.76 m (5 ft 9 1/2 in)
- Position: Midfielder

Team information
- Current team: Świt Szczecin
- Number: 10

Youth career
- –2013: Pogoń Szczecin

Senior career*
Years	Team	Apps	(Gls)
2013–2018	Pogoń Szczecin	59	(8)
2014–2015	→ Flota Świnoujście (loan)	24	(3)
2016	→ Bytovia Bytów (loan)	17	(1)
2018–2019	Wisła Kraków	20	(3)
2019	Atromitos	3	(0)
2019–2020	Miedź Legnica	13	(3)
2020–2021	Odra Opole	21	(3)
2021–2022	Stal Mielec	13	(0)
2022–2023	ŁKS Łódź	23	(1)
2023	ŁKS Łódź II	5	(3)
2024	Arsenal Tivat	11	(0)
2024–	Świt Szczecin	62	(13)

International career
2013	Poland U18	2	(0)
2014	Poland U19	1	(0)
2015–2016	Poland U20	4	(0)
- * Club domestic league appearances and goals as of 19:01, 31 May 2026 (UTC)

Dawid Kort (born 29 April 1995) is a Polish professional footballer who plays as a midfielder for II liga club Świt Szczecin.

== Club career ==
Kort started his career with Pogoń Szczecin.

On 3 September 2020, he signed with Odra Opole.

On 1 September 2021, Kort joined Ekstraklasa side Stal Mielec on a one-year deal.

On 9 June 2022, he moved to I liga club ŁKS Łódź, signing a two-year contract.

In August 2024, after spending a year at Montenegrin club Arsenal Tivat, Kort returned to his hometown Szczecin to join third-tier club Świt.

== Career statistics ==
As of match played 30 May 2026

Appearances and goals by club, season and competition
Club	Season	League			National cup (Note: Includes Polish Cup, Greek Cup)		Other		Total	
Club	Season	Division	Apps	Goals	Apps	Goals	Apps	Goals	Apps	Goals
Pogoń Szczecin	2012–13	Ekstraklasa	1	0	0	0	—		1	0
Pogoń Szczecin	2013–14	Ekstraklasa	4	0	0	0	—		4	0
Pogoń Szczecin	2015–16	Ekstraklasa	10	2	0	0	—		10	2
Pogoń Szczecin	2016–17	Ekstraklasa	24	6	3	0	—		27	6
Pogoń Szczecin	2017–18	Ekstraklasa	20	0	2	2	—		22	2
Pogoń Szczecin	Total		59	8	5	2	0	0	64	10
Flota Świnoujście (loan)	2014–15	I liga	24	3	2	0	—		26	3
Bytovia Bytów (loan)	2015–16	I liga	17	1	1	0	—		18	1
Wisła Kraków	2018–19	Ekstraklasa	20	3	1	0	—		21	3
Atromitos	2018–19	Super League Greece	3	0	2	0	—		5	0
Miedź Legnica	2019–20	I liga	13	3	4	0	—		17	3
Odra Opole	2020–21	I liga	21	3	0	0	—		21	3
Stal Mielec	2021–22	Ekstraklasa	13	0	1	0	—		14	0
ŁKS Łódź	2022–23	I liga	23	1	1	1	—		24	2
ŁKS Łódź II	2022–23	III liga, gr. I	5	3	—		—		5	3
Arsenal Tivat	2023–24	Montenegrin First League	11	0	—		—		11	0
Świt Szczecin	2024–25	II liga	28	5	1	0	1 (Note: Appearance in II liga promotion play-offs)	1	30	6
Świt Szczecin	2025–26	II liga	33	7	3	3	—		36	10
Świt Szczecin	Total		61	12	4	3	1	1	66	16
Career total			270	37	21	6	1	1	292	44

== Honours ==
ŁKS Łódź

- I liga: 2022–23

ŁKS Łódź II

- III liga, group I: 2022–23
