= Maciej Śliwa =

Polish footballer (born 2001)

Personal information
- Date of birth: 22 May 2001 (age 25)
- Place of birth: Starachowice, Poland
- Height: 1.75 m (5 ft 9 in)
- Position: Attacking midfielder

Team information
- Current team: Stal Stalowa Wola
- Number: 23

Youth career
- 2012–2013: Sokół Starachowice
- 2013–2017: Juventa Starachowice
- 2017–2018: Wisła Kraków

Senior career*
Years	Team	Apps	(Gls)
2018–2019	Wisła Kraków	5	(1)
2019–2022	Miedź Legnica II	8	(1)
2019–2023	Miedź Legnica	85	(8)
2023–2024	ŁKS Łódź	25	(1)
2023–2024	ŁKS Łódź II	17	(3)
2024–2025	GKS Jastrzębie	26	(3)
2025–2026	Sokół Kleczew	34	(7)
2026–	Stal Stalowa Wola	0	(0)

International career
2018	Poland U18	2	(0)
2021	Poland U20	1	(0)
- * Club domestic league appearances and goals as of 18:20, 9 June 2026 (UTC)

Maciej Śliwa (born 22 May 2001) is a Polish professional footballer who plays as an attacking midfielder for II liga club Stal Stalowa Wola.

== Career statistics ==
As of match played 9 June 2026

Appearances and goals by club, season and competition
Club	Season	League			Polish Cup		Other		Total	
Club	Season	Division	Apps	Goals	Apps	Goals	Apps	Goals	Apps	Goals
Wisła Kraków	2018–19	Ekstraklasa	5	1	0	0	—		5	1
Miedź Legnica	2019–20	I liga	23	1	4	0	1 (Note: Appearance in I liga promotion play-offs)	1	28	2
Miedź Legnica	2020–21	I liga	21	0	1	0	—		22	0
Miedź Legnica	2021–22	I liga	32	5	1	1	—		33	6
Miedź Legnica	2022–23	Ekstraklasa	8	1	1	0	—		9	1
Miedź Legnica	Total		84	7	7	1	1	1	92	9
ŁKS Łódź	2022–23	I liga	12	1	—		—		12	1
ŁKS Łódź	2023–24	Ekstraklasa	13	0	1	0	—		13	0
ŁKS Łódź	Total		25	1	1	0	—		26	1
GKS Jastrzębie	2024–25	II liga	26	3	0	0	—		26	3
Sokół Kleczew	2025–26	II liga	33	5	—		1 (Note: Appearance in II liga relegation play-offs)	2	34	7
Stal Stalowa Wola	2026–27	II liga	0	0	0	0	—		0	0
Career total			173	17	8	1	2	3	183	21

== Honours ==
Miedź Legnica

- I liga: 2021–22

ŁKS Łódź

- I liga: 2022–23

ŁKS Łódź II

- III liga, group I: 2022–23
