= Stefan Savić (Austrian footballer) =

Austrian footballer (born 1994)

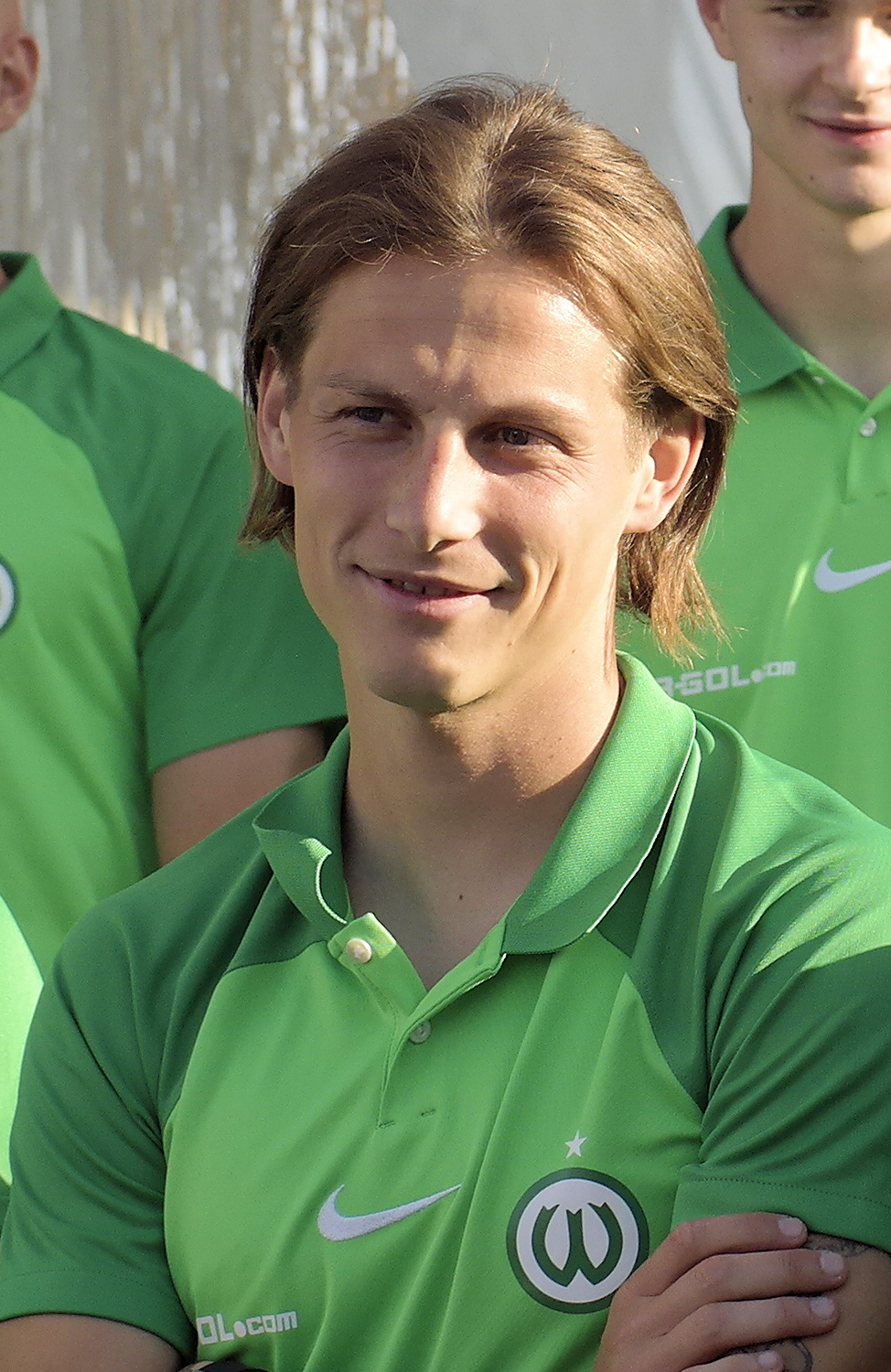
- Savić with Warta Poznań in 2023

Personal information
- Date of birth: 9 January 1994 (age 32)
- Place of birth: Salzburg, Austria
- Height: 1.74 m (5 ft 9 in)
- Positions: Attacking midfielder; winger

Team information
- Current team: Borac Banja Luka
- Number: 77

Youth career
- 2001–2004: Lieferinger SV
- 2005–2010: Red Bull Salzburg

Senior career*
Years	Team	Apps	(Gls)
2004–2005	Lieferinger SV	5	(0)
2010–2013	Red Bull Salzburg	2	(0)
2010–2012	→ Red Bull Salzburg Juniors	36	(9)
2012–2013	→ FC Liefering (loan)	22	(7)
2014	FC Liefering	35	(5)
2015	LASK	14	(0)
2015	→ FC Pasching / LASK Juniors	1	(0)
2015–2017	Slaven Belupo	55	(5)
2017	Roda JC Kerkrade	0	(0)
2017–2020	Olimpija Ljubljana	104	(17)
2020–2022	Wisła Kraków	52	(5)
2022–2023	Tuzlaspor	7	(0)
2023–2024	Warta Poznań	44	(5)
2024–	Borac Banja Luka	65	(10)

International career
2009–2010	Austria U16	4	(1)
2010–2011	Austria U17	7	(1)
2011	Austria U18	2	(0)
2012	Austria U19	5	(1)
- * Club domestic league appearances and goals as of 20 September 2026

Stefan Savić (born 9 January 1994) is an Austrian professional footballer who plays as a midfielder for Bosnian Premier League club Borac Banja Luka.

== Career ==
He started his football career in his local club Lieferinger SV and came to the youth academy of Red Bull Salzburg in 2005. From 2010, he played for the second team the Red Bull Salzburg Juniors. In 2011, he played one match in the first squad and was substituted in the halftime by Christoph Leitgeb. On 27 August 2012, he signed for FC Liefering.

In 2015, he signed for the Croatian team Slaven Belupo.

On 6 August 2020, he signed a two-year deal with Polish Ekstraklasa club Wisła Kraków.

== Career statistics ==
As of match played 20 September 2026

Appearances and goals by club, season and competition
Club	Season	League			National cup (Note: Includes Austrian Cup, Croatian Cup, Slovenian Cup, Polish Cup, Turkish Cup, Bosnian Cup)		Continental		Other		Total	
Club	Season	Division	Apps	Goals	Apps	Goals	Apps	Goals	Apps	Goals	Apps	Goals
Red Bull Salzburg Juniors	2010–11	Austrian Regionalliga	15	6	—		—		—		15	6
Red Bull Salzburg Juniors	2011–12	Austrian Regionalliga	21	3	3	1	—		—		24	4
Red Bull Salzburg Juniors	Total		36	9	3	1	—		—		39	10
Red Bull Salzburg	2011–12	Austrian Bundesliga	2	0	—		1 (Note: Appearance(s) in the UEFA Europa League)	0	—		3	0
FC Liefering	2012–13	Austrian Regionalliga	22	7	—		—		2 (Note: Appearances in the 2012–13 Austrian Regionalliga promotion play-offs)	2	24	9
FC Liefering	2013–14	Austrian First League	15	4	—		—		—		15	4
FC Liefering	2014–15	Austrian First League	20	1	—		—		—		20	1
FC Liefering	Total		57	12	—		—		2	2	59	14
LASK	2014–15	Austrian First League	14	0	—		—		—		14	0
FC Pasching (loan)	2014–15	Austrian Regionalliga	1	0	—		—		—		1	0
Slaven Belupo	2015–16	Croatian Football League	36	3	3	1	—		—		39	4
Slaven Belupo	2016–17	Croatian Football League	19	2	3	0	—		—		22	2
Slaven Belupo	Total		55	5	6	1	—		—		61	6
Olimpija Ljubljana	2017–18	Slovenian PrvaLiga	34	4	5	1	—		—		39	5
Olimpija Ljubljana	2018–19	Slovenian PrvaLiga	35	7	5	5	8 (Note: Six appearances in UEFA Europa League, two appearances in UEFA Champions League)	0	—		48	12
Olimpija Ljubljana	2019–20	Slovenian PrvaLiga	35	6	1	0	4	1	—		40	7
Olimpija Ljubljana	Total		104	17	11	6	12	1	—		127	24
Wisła Kraków	2020–21	Ekstraklasa	27	2	1	0	—		—		28	2
Wisła Kraków	2021–22	Ekstraklasa	25	3	2	0	—		—		27	3
Wisła Kraków	Total		52	5	3	0	—		—		55	5
Tuzlaspor	2022–23	TFF First League	7	0	2	0	—		—		9	0
Warta Poznań	2022–23	Ekstraklasa	15	3	—		—		—		15	3
Warta Poznań	2023–24	Ekstraklasa	29	2	3	1	—		—		32	3
Warta Poznań	Total		44	5	3	1	—		—		47	6
Borac Banja Luka	2024–25	Bosnian Premier League	26	3	3	0	18 (Note: Four appearances in UEFA Champions League, four appearances and one goal in UEFA Europa League, ten appearances and one goal in UEFA Conference League)	2	1 (Note: Appearance in the Bosnian Supercup)	0	48	5
Borac Banja Luka	2025–26	Bosnian Premier League	32	7	1	0	2 (Note: Appearances in UEFA Conference League)	0	—		35	7
Borac Banja Luka	2026–27	Bosnian Premier League	7	0	0	0	8 (Note: Two appearances in UEFA Champions League, six appearances and two goals in UEFA Conference League)	2	—		15	2
Borac Banja Luka	Total		65	10	4	0	28	4	1	0	98	14
Career total			437	63	32	9	41	5	3	2	513	79

== Honours ==
Red Bull Salzburg

- Austrian Bundesliga: 2011–12
- Austrian Cup: 2011–12

FC Liefering

- Austrian Regionalliga West: 2012–13

Olimpija Ljubljana

- Slovenian PrvaLiga: 2017–18
- Slovenian Cup: 2017–18, 2018–19

Borac Banja Luka

- Bosnian Premier League: 2025–26

Individual

- Bosnian Premier League Player of the Season: 2025–26
