= Marko Kolar =

Croatian footballer

Personal information
- Date of birth: 31 May 1995 (age 31)
- Place of birth: Zabok, Croatia
- Height: 1.78 m (5 ft 10 in)
- Position: Forward

Team information
- Current team: Sandecja Nowy Sącz
- Number: 7

Youth career
- –2006: Mladost Zabok
- 2006–2007: Tondach Bedekovčina
- 2008–2013: Dinamo Zagreb

Senior career*
Years	Team	Apps	(Gls)
2012–2015	Dinamo Zagreb	0	(0)
2013–2014	→ Sesvete (loan)	20	(8)
2014–2015	→ Lokomotiva (loan)	30	(7)
2015–2017	Lokomotiva	27	(3)
2016–2017	→ Inter Zaprešić (loan)	29	(5)
2017–2019	Wisła Kraków	31	(12)
2019–2021	Emmen	35	(5)
2021–2023	Wisła Płock	53	(8)
2023–2024	Maribor	19	(1)
2024–2025	Gorica	24	(5)
2025–2026	Ruch Chorzów	26	(6)
2026–	Sandecja Nowy Sącz	8	(0)

International career
2009	Croatia U14	2	(0)
2010	Croatia U15	4	(4)
2011	Croatia U16	4	(1)
2011	Croatia U17	11	(5)
2013	Croatia U19	6	(5)
2014–2016	Croatia U21	7	(0)
- * Club domestic league appearances and goals as of 11:23, 14 September 2026 (UTC)

Marko Kolar (born 31 May 1995) is a Croatian professional footballer who plays as a forward for I liga club Sandecja Nowy Sącz.

== Club career ==
Kolar started his career at Mladost Zabok and Tondach Bedekovčina before joining Dinamo Zagreb in 2008. He was the top scorer in the 2011–12 season of the Croatian Academy Football League. In September 2012, Kolar signed a seven-year professional contract with Dinamo Zagreb. In the 2013–14 season, Kolar was loaned to second-tier club Sesvete. He was then loaned to Lokomotiva for the 2014–15 season, before joining Lokomotiva permanently after the season.

On 5 September 2017, Kolar signed a contract with Wisła Kraków.

On 17 June 2019, he signed a two-year contract with Dutch Eredivisie club FC Emmen.
