= Paweł Kieszek =

Polish footballer

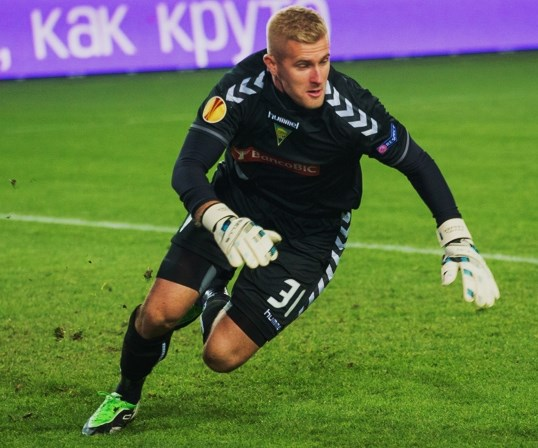
- Kieszek in action for Estoril in 2014

Personal information
- Date of birth: 16 April 1984 (age 42)
- Place of birth: Warsaw, Poland
- Height: 1.87 m (6 ft 2 in)
- Position: Goalkeeper

Senior career*
Years	Team	Apps	(Gls)
2003–2007	Polonia Warsaw	28	(0)
2006	→ Egaleo (loan)	8	(0)
2007–2010	Braga	11	(0)
2009	→ Vitória Setúbal (loan)	10	(0)
2010–2012	Porto	1	(0)
2011–2012	→ Roda (loan)	25	(0)
2012–2014	Vitória Setúbal	53	(0)
2014–2016	Estoril	55	(0)
2016–2018	Córdoba	76	(0)
2018–2019	Málaga	5	(0)
2019–2021	Rio Ave	68	(0)
2021–2022	Wisła Kraków	14	(0)
2023–2025	União Leiria	71	(0)
2025–2026	Pogoń Grodzisk Mazowiecki	33	(0)

International career
2006	Poland U20	1	(0)
- * Club domestic league appearances and goals as of 19:35, 26 May 2026 (UTC)

Paweł Kieszek ([ˈpavɛu̯ ˈkʲɛʂɛk]; born 16 April 1984) is a Polish professional footballer who plays as a goalkeeper.

After starting out at Polonia Warsaw he went on to spend most of his career in Portugal, signing in 2007 with Braga. He also played three years in the Spanish Segunda División, with Córdoba and Málaga.

== Club career ==
Born in Warsaw, Kieszek began his professional career at local Polonia Warsaw in the Ekstraklasa. In January 2006 he was loaned to Greek club Egaleo FC, where he remained until the end of the year; he returned to Polonia, which had been relegated to the second division in his absence, for 2006–07, playing only a few games before getting injured and missing the rest of the season.

Kieszek signed with S.C. Braga in Portugal in June 2007, on a free transfer. He made his debut for his new team on 21 February 2008 in a 0–1 home loss to SV Werder Bremen in the round of 32 of the UEFA Cup, first appearing in the Primeira Liga three days later against S.L. Benfica (1–1).

In January 2009, Kieszek joined Vitória F.C. on loan until the end of the campaign, being relatively used during his spell as the Sadinos managed to retain their top-flight status. Upon his return to Braga, he was a backup to Portuguese international Eduardo.

In July 2010, after an uneventful 2009–10 with Braga – the side finished second, but he only appeared in three matches in that season's Taça da Liga, conceding four goals – Kieszek signed a four-year contract with FC Porto, with Braga retaining 50% of his economic rights. In August of the following year, after only four official appearances, he was loaned to Roda JC from the Netherlands.

On 16 June 2014, after two years with former team Setúbal, Kieszek agreed to a two-year deal with G.D. Estoril Praia. On 13 July 2016, after 62 competitive matches, he switched clubs and countries again, joining Spanish Segunda División's Córdoba CF.

On 31 August 2018, as Córdoba's financial situation prevented his registration, Kieszek terminated his contract and moved to Málaga CF in the same league. He returned to Portugal and its top tier 11 months later, agreeing to a two-year deal at Rio Ave FC.

Kieszek was announced at Wisła Kraków in August 2021 on a one-year contract, with the option of an extension. He went back to Portugal in December 2022, signing an initial six-month deal with U.D. Leiria. At the end of his first season, he achieved promotion to the Liga Portugal 2.

On 25 June 2025, having made 74 appearances, the 41-year-old Kieszek left the club. On 18 July, he returned to his home country on a one-year contract at newly promoted I liga side Pogoń Grodzisk Mazowiecki, being released when it expired.

== Career statistics ==
As of match played 24 May 2026

Appearances and goals by club, season and competition
Season	Club	League			National cup (Note: Includes Polish Cup, Taça de Portugal, KNVB Cup, Copa del Rey)		Other		Total	
Season	Club	Division	Apps	Goals	Apps	Goals	Apps	Goals	Apps	Goals
Polonia Warsaw	2003–04	Ekstraklasa	6	0	1	0	—		7	0
Polonia Warsaw	2004–05	Ekstraklasa	3	0	7	0	—		10	0
Polonia Warsaw	2005–06	Ekstraklasa	16	0	0	0	—		16	0
Polonia Warsaw	2006–07	I liga	3	0	0	0	—		3	0
Polonia Warsaw	Total		28	0	8	0	—		36	0
Egaleo (loan)	2005–06	Super League Greece	5	0	0	0	—		5	0
Egaleo (loan)	2006–07	Super League Greece	3	0	0	0	—		3	0
Egaleo (loan)	Total		8	0	0	0	—		8	0
Braga	2007–08	Primeira Liga	11	0	0	0	1 (Note: Appearance in UEFA Cup/UEFA Europa League)	0	12	0
Braga	2008–09	Primeira Liga	0	0	0	0	1 (Note: Appearances in Taça da Liga)	0	1	0
Braga	2009–10	Primeira Liga	0	0	2	0	3	0	5	0
Braga	Total		11	0	2	0	5	0	18	0
Vitória Setúbal (loan)	2008–09	Primeira Liga	10	0	0	0	0	0	10	0
Porto	2010–11	Primeira Liga	1	0	2	0	1	0	4	0
Roda (loan)	2011–12	Eredivisie	25	0	2	0	—		27	0
Vitória Setúbal	2012–13	Primeira Liga	27	0	2	0	3	0	32	0
Vitória Setúbal	2013–14	Primeira Liga	26	0	1	0	5	0	32	0
Vitória Setúbal	Total		53	0	3	0	8	0	64	0
Estoril	2014–15	Primeira Liga	24	0	1	0	4 (Note: Three appearances in UEFA Europa League, one appearance in Taça da Liga)	0	29	0
Estoril	2015–16	Primeira Liga	31	0	3	0	0	0	34	0
Estoril	Total		55	0	4	0	4	0	63	0
Córdoba	2016–17	Segunda División	38	0	3	0	—		41	0
Córdoba	2017–18	Segunda División	38	0	1	0	—		39	0
Córdoba	Total		76	0	4	0	—		80	0
Málaga	2018–19	Segunda División	5	0	1	0	0	0	6	0
Rio Ave	2019–20	Primeira Liga	34	0	0	0	0	0	34	0
Rio Ave	2020–21	Primeira Liga	34	0	1	0	5 (Note: Two appearances in Primeira Liga play-offs, three appearances in UEFA Europa League)	0	40	0
Rio Ave	Total		68	0	1	0	5	0	74	0
Wisła Kraków	2021–22	Ekstraklasa	14	0	1	0	—		15	0
União Leiria	2022–23	Liga 3	9	0	—		—		9	0
União Leiria	2023–24	Liga Portugal 2	30	0	1	0	2	0	33	0
União Leiria	2024–25	Liga Portugal 2	32	0	0	0	—		32	0
União Leiria	Total		71	0	1	0	2	0	74	0
Pogoń Grodzisk Mazowiecki	2025–26	I liga	33	0	1	0	—		34	0
Career total			458	0	30	0	25	0	513	0

== Honours ==
Porto

- Primeira Liga: 2010–11
- Taça de Portugal: 2010–11

Individual

- Primeira Liga Fair Play Award: 2019–20
