= Martin Košťál =

Slovak footballer (born 1996)

Personal information
- Full name: Martin Košťál
- Date of birth: 23 February 1996 (age 30)
- Place of birth: Nové Zámky, Slovakia
- Height: 1.79 m (5 ft 10 in)
- Position: Midfielder

Team information
- Current team: Zlaté Moravce
- Number: 77

Youth career
- Nové Zámky
- Nitra
- Spartak Trnava

Senior career*
Years	Team	Apps	(Gls)
2014–2017	Spartak Trnava B	51	(5)
2016–2017	Spartak Trnava	18	(1)
2017–2018	Wisła Kraków	23	(2)
2019–2021	Jagiellonia Białystok	29	(0)
2020–2021	→ Senica (loan)	27	(6)
2021	Jagiellonia Białystok II	14	(6)
2022	Ortion Tip Sereď	10	(0)
2022–2023	Sigma Olomouc	2	(0)
2022	Sigma Olomouc B	3	(0)
2023	Sandecja Nowy Sącz	11	(0)
2023–2024	Nové Zámky		
2024–	Zlaté Moravce	10	(1)

International career
2018	Slovakia U21	2	(0)
- * Club domestic league appearances and goals as of 15 June 2025

Martin Košťál (born 23 February 1996) is a Slovak professional footballer who plays as a midfielder for Zlaté Moravce.

== Career ==
=== Spartak Trnava ===
Košťál made his Fortuna Liga debut for Trnava against Dunajská Streda on 19 March 2016.

=== Wisła Kraków ===
On 10 July 2017, he signed a contract with Wisła Kraków.

=== Jagiellonia Białystok ===
On 21 January 2019, he signed a contract with Jagiellonia Białystok.
