= Olaf Nowak =

Polish footballer (born 1998)

Personal information
- Date of birth: 24 February 1998 (age 28)
- Place of birth: Kraków, Poland
- Height: 1.80 m (5 ft 11 in)
- Position: Forward

Team information
- Current team: Flota Świnoujście

Youth career
- –2010: Wisła Kraków
- 2011–2012: Garbarnia Kraków
- 2012–2014: Wisła Kraków
- 2014–2017: Zagłębie Lubin

Senior career*
Years	Team	Apps	(Gls)
2017–2020	Zagłębie Lubin II	54	(26)
2018–2020	Zagłębie Lubin	2	(0)
2018–2019	→ Zagłębie Sosnowiec (loan)	14	(4)
2019–2020	→ Wisła Płock (loan)	10	(0)
2020–2021	Zagłębie Sosnowiec	16	(0)
2021	Chojniczanka Chojnice	17	(1)
2021–2022	Podhale Nowy Targ	27	(6)
2022–2023	Stilon Gorzów Wielkopolski	30	(4)
2023–2024	Kotwica Kołobrzeg	28	(5)
2025	Stilon Gorzów Wielkopolski	14	(4)
2025–2026	Stal Stalowa Wola	10	(1)
2026–	Flota Świnoujście	0	(0)
- * Club domestic league appearances and goals as of 11:16, 31 May 2026 (UTC)

Olaf Nowak (born 24 February 1998) is a Polish professional footballer who plays as a forward for III liga club Flota Świnoujście.

== Club career ==
On 30 July 2020, Nowak returned to Zagłębie Sosnowiec on a permanent basis and signed a two-year contract. He left by mutual consent in January 2021.

== Honours ==
Zagłębie Lubin II

- IV liga Lower Silesia West: 2016–17
- Polish Cup (Lower Silesia regionals): 2016–17
- Polish Cup (Legnica regionals): 2016–17

Podhale Nowy Targ

- Polish Cup (Podhale regionals): 2021–22
