= Marcin Grabowski =

Polish footballer

Personal information
- Full name: Marcin Grabowski
- Date of birth: 21 May 2000 (age 26)
- Place of birth: Jastrowie, Poland
- Height: 1.77 m (5 ft 10 in)
- Position: Left-back

Team information
- Current team: Stal Stalowa Wola
- Number: 3

Youth career
- Polonia Jastrowie
- 2012–2013: Sparta Złotów
- 2013–2014: Błękitni Wronki
- 2014–2018: Lech Poznań

Senior career*
Years	Team	Apps	(Gls)
2016–2018	Lech Poznań II	7	(1)
2018–2020	Wisła Kraków	10	(0)
2020	→ Bruk-Bet Termalica (loan)	14	(0)
2020–2023	Bruk-Bet Termalica	65	(2)
2023–2025	Górnik Łęczna	36	(0)
2026	KKS 1925 Kalisz	14	(0)
2026–	Stal Stalowa Wola	0	(0)

International career
2014–2015	Poland U15	3	(0)
2015–2016	Poland U16	6	(0)
2016–2017	Poland U17	11	(0)
2017–2018	Poland U18	5	(0)
2017–2019	Poland U19	12	(1)
2019	Poland U20	3	(0)
2021	Poland U21	2	(0)
- * Club domestic league appearances and goals as of 09:31, 31 May 2026 (UTC)

Marcin Grabowski (born 21 May 2000) is a Polish professional footballer who plays as a left-back for II liga club Stal Stalowa Wola.

== Club career ==
On 22 February 2018 Wisła Kraków confirmed that Grabowski would join the club from the 2018–19 season onwards. Grabowski only played eight league games in his first season. In the second season, he made two appearances before he was loaned out to Bruk-Bet Termalica Nieciecza on 15 January 2020 for the rest of the season. He joined Bruk-Bet, as a free agent at the end of the season.

On 3 July 2023, Grabowski moved to Górnik Łęczna on a two-year deal.

On 8 January 2026, after spending six months without a club, Grabowski joined II liga club KKS 1925 Kalisz on an eighteen-month deal.

On 17 July 2026, Grabowski signed with another third-tier club Stal Stalowa Wola.
