= Dor Hugi =

Israeli footballer

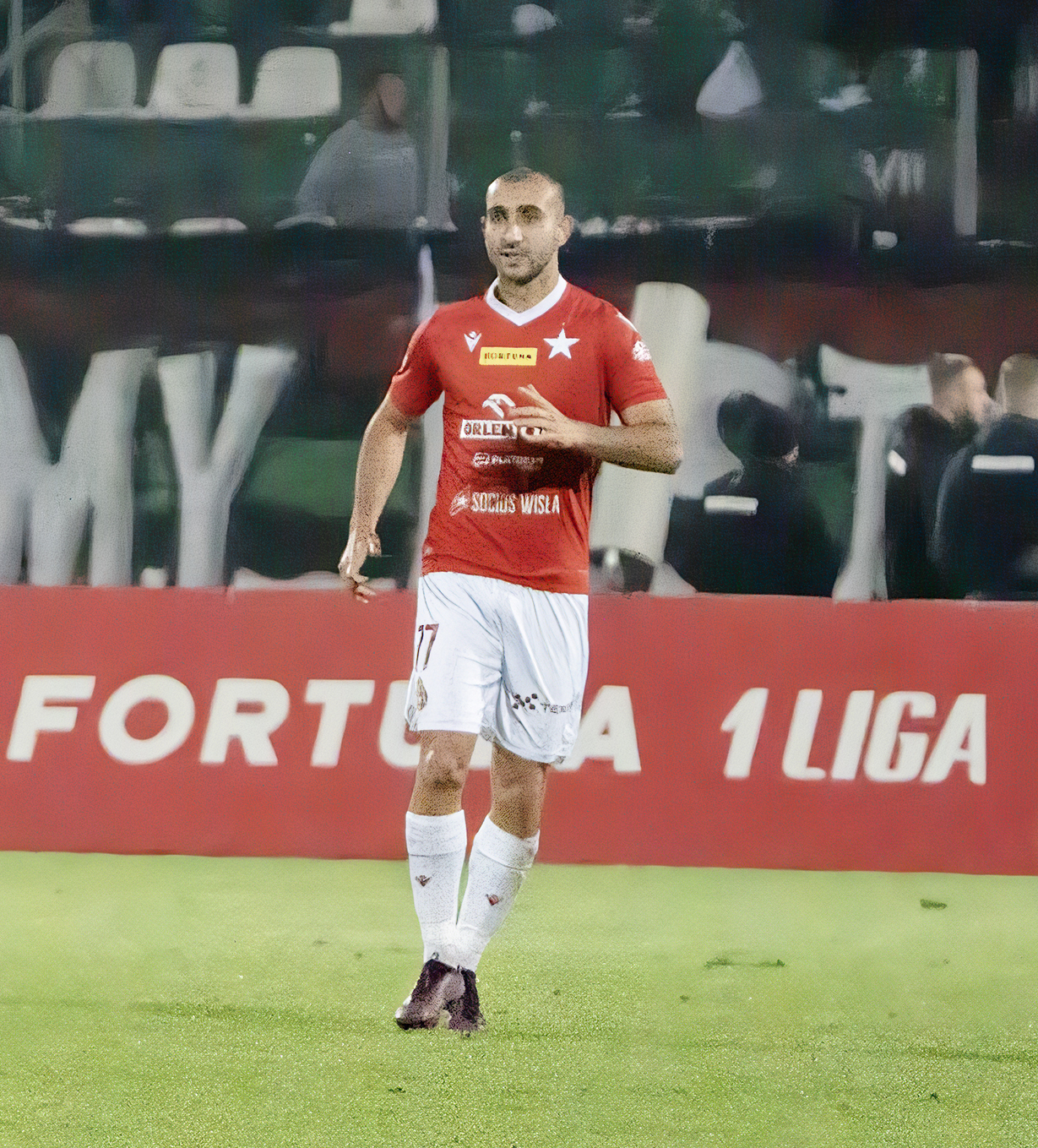
- Hugi with Wisła Kraków in 2022

Personal information
- Full name: Dor Hugi
- Date of birth: 10 July 1995 (age 31)
- Place of birth: Bnei Brak, Israel
- Height: 1.80 m (5 ft 11 in)
- Position: Forward

Team information
- Current team: Maccabi Netanya

Youth career
- 2005–2010: Hapoel Petah Tikva
- 2010–2012: Maccabi Petah Tikva
- 2012–2014: Maccabi Haifa

Senior career*
Years	Team	Apps	(Gls)
2014–2016	Maccabi Haifa	1	(0)
2014–2015	→ Hapoel Petah Tikva (loan)	24	(7)
2015–2016	→ Maccabi Petah Tikva (loan)	26	(3)
2016–2018	Hapoel Ra'anana	36	(4)
2018	Hapoel Tel Aviv	18	(6)
2018–2019	Hapoel Ramat Gan	35	(8)
2019–2020	Maccabi Petah Tikva	34	(11)
2020–2021	St. Polten	33	(8)
2021–2023	Wisła Kraków	36	(1)
2023	→ Bnei Sakhnin (loan)	14	(5)
2023–2024	Bnei Sakhnin	33	(4)
2024–2025	Hapoel Haifa	35	(9)
2025–	Beitar Jerusalem	29	(3)

International career
2010–2011	Israel U16	6	(0)
2011	Israel U17	1	(0)
2012–2013	Israel U18	7	(3)
2013–2014	Israel U19	18	(3)
2015–2016	Israel U21	10	(3)
- * Club domestic league appearances and goals as of 1 June 2026

Dor Hugi (Hebrew: דור חוגי; born 10 July 1995) is an Israeli professional footballer who plays as a forward for Beitar Jerusalem.

== Early life ==
Hugi was born in Bnei Brak, Israel, to a family of Jewish descent.

== Club career ==
=== Youth career ===
After playing for Hapoel and Maccabi Petah Tikva, Hugi moved to Maccabi Haifa youth team in 2012. He led Maccabi to two Israeli Youth Premier League championships and two Israeli Youth State Cup wins in the 2012–13 and the 2013–14 seasons, becoming the first Israeli team to win the youth double two years in the row.

=== Senior career ===
On 17 May 2014, he made his debut for the senior team, in a 1–1 draw against Hapoel Be'er Sheva at Vasermil Stadium. On 20 June 2014, Hugi was loaned to Hapoel Petah Tikva. On 18 October 2014, he scored his debut senior goal in a 4–1 win against Hapoel Acre. He finished the season with 7 goals in 24 appearances.

On 1 July 2015, he was loaned to the urban rival Maccabi Petah Tikva.

== International career ==
Hugi played for the Israel U19 football team, and was a part of their squad for the 2014 UEFA European Under-19 Championship.
