= Oskar Sewerzyński =

Polish footballer (born 2001)

Personal information
- Date of birth: 12 August 2001 (age 25)
- Place of birth: Kielce, Poland
- Height: 1.86 m (6 ft 1 in)
- Position: Midfielder

Team information
- Current team: Podbeskidzie Bielsko-Biała
- Number: 26

Youth career
- 2011–2019: Korona Kielce

Senior career*
Years	Team	Apps	(Gls)
2019–2024	Korona Kielce II	47	(7)
2019–2024	Korona Kielce	34	(0)
2020–2021	→ Pogoń Siedlce (loan)	17	(1)
2023	→ Chrobry Głogów (loan)	6	(0)
2023	→ Chrobry Głogów II (loan)	3	(1)
2024–2026	Olimpia Grudziądz	60	(2)
2026–	Podbeskidzie Bielsko-Biała	0	(0)
- * Club domestic league appearances and goals as of 16:05, 2 June 2026 (UTC)

Oskar Sewerzyński (born 12 August 2001) is a Polish professional footballer who plays as a midfielder for I liga club Podbeskidzie Bielsko-Biała.

== Club career ==
On 11 September 2020, Sewerzyński joined Pogoń Siedlce on a season-long loan.

== Honours ==
Korona Kielce II

- IV liga Świętokrzyskie: 2018–19, 2021–22, 2023–24
