= Konrad Gruszkowski =

Polish professional footballer

Personal information
- Full name: Konrad Jan Gruszkowski
- Date of birth: 27 January 2001 (age 25)
- Place of birth: Rabka Zdrój, Poland
- Height: 1.83 m (6 ft 0 in)
- Position: Right-back

Team information
- Current team: Arka Gdynia
- Number: 20

Youth career
- –2016: Turbacz Mszana Dolna
- 2016–2018: AS Progres Kraków
- 2018–2019: Wisła Kraków

Senior career*
| Years | Team | Apps | (Gls) |
| 2019–2023 | Wisła Kraków | 52 | (3) |
| 2019–2020 | → Motor Lublin (loan) | 14 | (0) |
| 2023–2025 | DAC Dunajská Streda | 26 | (1) |
| 2025–2026 | GKS Katowice | 20 | (0) |
| 2026– | Arka Gdynia | 0 | (0) |

International career
| 2021 | Poland U20 | 2 | (0) |
| 2021–2022 | Poland U21 | 7 | (0) |
- * Club domestic league appearances and goals as of 10:42, 30 May 2026 (UTC)

Konrad Jan Gruszkowski (born 27 January 2001) is a Polish professional footballer who plays as a right-back for I liga club Arka Gdynia.

== Career statistics ==
As of match played 22 February 2026

Appearances and goals by club, season and competition
| Club | Season | League | | | National cup (Note: Includes Polish Cup, Slovak Cup) | | Europe | | Other | | Total | |
| Club | Season | Division | Apps | Goals | Apps | Goals | Apps | Goals | Apps | Goals | Apps | Goals |
|---|---|---|---|---|---|---|---|---|---|---|---|---|
| Motor Lublin (loan) | 2019–20 | III liga, gr. IV | 14 | 0 | — | | — | | — | | 14 | 0 |
| Wisła Kraków | 2020–21 | Ekstraklasa | 7 | 0 | 0 | 0 | — | | — | | 7 | 0 |
| Wisła Kraków | 2021–22 | Ekstraklasa | 30 | 2 | 2 | 0 | — | | — | | 32 | 2 |
| Wisła Kraków | 2022–23 | I liga | 15 | 1 | 2 | 0 | — | | — | | 17 | 1 |
| Wisła Kraków | Total | | 52 | 3 | 4 | 0 | — | | — | | 56 | 3 |
| DAC Dunajská Streda | 2023–24 | Niké liga | 18 | 1 | 4 | 0 | 0 | 0 | — | | 22 | 1 |
| DAC Dunajská Streda | 2024–25 | Niké liga | 8 | 0 | 1 | 0 | 0 | 0 | — | | 9 | 0 |
| DAC Dunajská Streda | Total | | 26 | 1 | 5 | 0 | 0 | 0 | — | | 31 | 1 |
| GKS Katowice | 2024–25 | Ekstraklasa | 12 | 0 | — | | — | | — | | 12 | 0 |
| GKS Katowice | 2025–26 | Ekstraklasa | 8 | 0 | 0 | 0 | — | | — | | 8 | 0 |
| GKS Katowice | Total | | 20 | 0 | 0 | 0 | — | | — | | 20 | 0 |
| Arka Gdynia | 2026–27 | I liga | 0 | 0 | 0 | 0 | — | | — | | 0 | 0 |
| Career total | | | 112 | 4 | 9 | 0 | 0 | 0 | — | | 121 | 4 |

== Honours ==
Motor Lublin

- III liga, group IV: 2019–20
- Polish Cup (Lublin subdistrict regionals): 2019–20
