= Hubert Sobol =

Polish footballer (born 2000)

Personal information
- Full name: Hubert Sobol
- Date of birth: 25 June 2000 (age 26)
- Place of birth: Olsztyn, Poland
- Height: 1.83 m (6 ft 0 in)
- Position: Forward

Team information
- Current team: Chojniczanka Chojnice
- Number: 9

Youth career
- 2012–2015: DKS Dobre Miasto
- 2015–2018: Lech Poznań

Senior career*
Years	Team	Apps	(Gls)
2017–2021	Lech Poznań II	49	(24)
2018–2021	Lech Poznań	4	(0)
2019	→ Warta Poznań (loan)	1	(0)
2019	→ Odra Opole (loan)	6	(0)
2021–2023	Wisła Kraków	8	(0)
2022	→ Stomil Olsztyn (loan)	14	(1)
2022–2023	→ Górnik Łęczna (loan)	15	(2)
2023–2024	KKS 1925 Kalisz	35	(23)
2024–2025	Widzew Łódź	24	(0)
2025–2026	Lokomotiva Zagreb	9	(0)
2026	→ Široki Brijeg (loan)	13	(0)
2026–	Chojniczanka Chojnice	0	(0)

International career
2016	Poland U16		
2017	Poland U17	3	(2)
2017	Poland U18	5	(0)
2018–2019	Poland U19	9	(1)
- * Club domestic league appearances and goals as of 09:59, 1 June 2026 (UTC)

Hubert Sobol (born 25 June 2000) is a Polish professional footballer who plays as a forward for II liga club Chojniczanka Chojnice.

== Career ==
In June 2019, it was confirmed that Sobol would spend one more season out on loan, this time at Odra Opole for the whole 2019–20 season.

== Honours ==
Lech Poznań II

- III liga, group II: 2018–19

Individual

- Polish Union of Footballers' II liga Team of the Season: 2023–24
