= Serafin Szota =

Polish footballer (born 1999)

Personal information
- Full name: Serafin Jan Szota
- Date of birth: 4 March 1999 (age 27)
- Place of birth: Namysłów, Poland
- Height: 1.87 m (6 ft 2 in)
- Position: Centre-back

Team information
- Current team: Arka Gdynia
- Number: 3

Youth career
- –2012: Start Namysłów
- 2012–2017: Lech Poznań

Senior career*
Years	Team	Apps	(Gls)
2017–2019	Zagłębie Lubin II	26	(1)
2018–2019	→ Odra Opole (loan)	21	(0)
2019–2022	Wisła Kraków	23	(1)
2020	→ Stomil Olsztyn (loan)	27	(1)
2022–2024	Widzew Łódź	43	(0)
2024–2026	Śląsk Wrocław	39	(3)
2024	Śląsk Wrocław II	1	(0)
2026–	Arka Gdynia	10	(0)

International career
2015–2016	Poland U17	4	(0)
2016–2017	Poland U18	3	(0)
2017–2018	Poland U19	11	(0)
2018–2019	Poland U20	19	(1)
- * Club domestic league appearances and goals as of 17:31, 25 May 2026 (UTC)

Serafin Jan Szota (born 4 March 1999) is a Polish professional footballer who plays as a centre-back for I liga club Arka Gdynia.

== Career statistics ==
As of match played 23 May 2026

Appearances and goals by club, season and competition
Club	Season	League			Polish Cup		Continental		Other		Total	
Club	Season	Division	Apps	Goals	Apps	Goals	Apps	Goals	Apps	Goals	Apps	Goals
Zagłębie Lubin II	2016–17	IV liga Lesser Poland	2	0	—		—		—		2	0
Zagłębie Lubin II	2017–18	III liga, gr. II	24	1	1	0	—		—		25	1
Zagłębie Lubin II	Total		26	1	1	0	—		—		27	1
Odra Opole (loan)	2018–19	I liga	21	0	3	0	—		0	0	24	0
Wisła Kraków	2019–20	Ekstraklasa	0	0	1	0	—		—		1	0
Wisła Kraków	2020–21	Ekstraklasa	8	0	—		—		—		8	0
Wisła Kraków	2020–21	Ekstraklasa	15	1	2	1	—		—		17	2
Wisła Kraków	Total		23	1	3	1	—		—		26	3
Stomil Olsztyn (loan)	2019–20	I liga	10	0	—		—		—		10	0
Stomil Olsztyn (loan)	2020–21	I liga	17	1	1	1	—		—		18	2
Stomil Olsztyn (loan)	Total		27	1	1	1	—		—		28	2
Widzew Łódź	2022–23	Ekstraklasa	27	0	1	0	—		—		28	0
Widzew Łódź	2023–24	Ekstraklasa	16	0	1	0	—		—		17	0
Widzew Łódź	Total		43	0	2	0	—		—		45	0
Śląsk Wrocław	2024–25	Ekstraklasa	20	1	0	0	3 (Note: Appearances in UEFA Conference League)	0	—		23	1
Śląsk Wrocław	2025–26	I liga	19	2	3	0	—		—		22	2
Śląsk Wrocław	Total		39	3	3	0	3	0	—		45	3
Śląsk Wrocław II	2024–25	III liga, gr. III	1	0	—		—		—		1	0
Arka Gdynia	2025–26	Ekstraklasa	10	0	—		—		—		10	0
Career total			190	6	13	2	3	0	0	0	206	8

== Honours ==
Zagłębie Lubin II

- IV liga Lower Silesia West: 2016–17
- Polish Cup (Lower Silesia regionals): 2016–17
- Polish Cup (Legnica regionals): 2016–17

Śląsk Wrocław II

- III liga, group III: 2024–25
