= Michal Škvarka =

Slovak international footballer

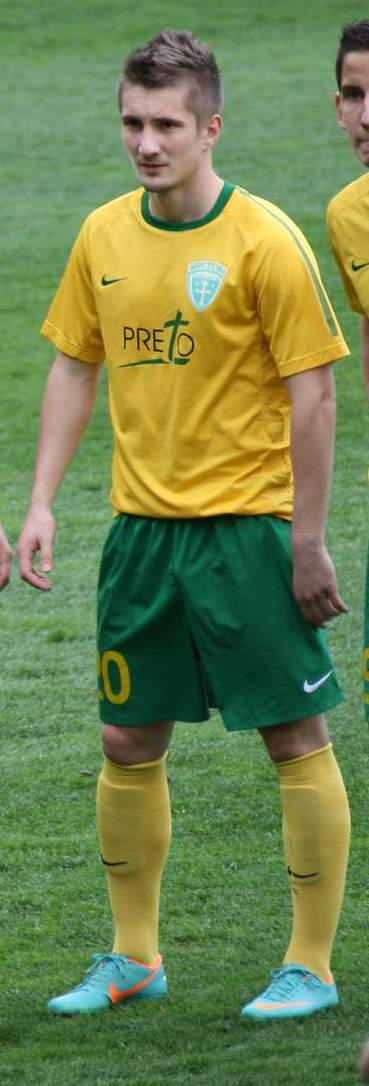
- Škvarka with Žilina in 2013

Personal information
- Date of birth: 19 August 1992 (age 34)
- Place of birth: Martin, Czechoslovakia
- Height: 1.73 m (5 ft 8 in)
- Position: Midfielder

Team information
- Current team: Žilina
- Number: 92

Youth career
- 2001–2004: TJD Príbovce
- 2004–2006: Fomat Martin
- 2006–2009: Žilina

Senior career*
Years	Team	Apps	(Gls)
2009–2019	Žilina	201	(44)
2011–2012	→ Zemplín Michalovce (loan)	29	(2)
2012	→ ViOn Zlaté Moravce (loan)	18	(3)
2019–2021	Ferencváros	26	(1)
2021–2022	Wisła Kraków	28	(2)
2022–2023	Levadiakos	15	(1)
2023–	Győr	40	(6)
2025–	Žilina	2	(0)
2025–	Žilina B	16	(2)

International career
2008–2010	Slovakia U17	3	(1)
2010–2012	Slovakia U19	12	(3)
2012–2013	Slovakia U21	2	(0)
2017	Slovakia	2	(0)
- * Club domestic league appearances and goals as of 25 May 2026

Michal Škvarka (born 19 August 1992) is a Slovak professional footballer who plays as a midfielder for Žilina.

== Club career ==
In July 2011, Škvarka joined Slovak club Zemplín Michalovce on a one-year loan from Žilina. He made his league debut for Michalovce against Ružomberok B on 31 July 2011.

On 19 June 2019, Škvarka joined Ferencváros on a three-year contract for a sum of 200 thousand Euros. It was also revealed that Ferencváros had seriously contented for his services even in winter of 2018–19 season, but the transfer did not take place due to Škvarka's injury. On 16 June 2020, he became champion with Ferencváros by beating Budapest Honvéd FC at the Hidegkuti Nándor Stadion on the 30th match day of the 2019–20 Nemzeti Bajnokság I season.

=== Wisła Kraków ===
On 6 July 2021, Škvarka's arrival to Polish Wisła Kraków was announced on a two-year deal, with an option for a one-year extension, as a free agent, where he was to be coached by Adrián Guľa - his ex-manager from Žilina. He left the club by mutual consent following its relegation to I liga.

== International career ==
In 2017, Škvarka was called up to the senior national team for two unofficial friendly fixtures held in Abu Dhabi, United Arab Emirates, against Uganda and Sweden. He debuted against the former opponent, playing from the start and playing the entire match as Slovakia went on to lose the game 1–3. Škvarka also played the first half of the match against Sweden (0–6 loss), when he was replaced by Martin Bukata.

== Honours ==
Žilina

- Fortuna Liga: 2009–10, 2016–17
- Slovak Cup: 2025–26

Ferencváros

- Nemzeti Bajnokság I: 2019–20, 2020–21

Individual

- Fortuna Liga Player of the Year 2016-17
