= Daniel Hoyo-Kowalski =

Polish footballer

Personal information
- Full name: Daniel Hoyo-Kowalski
- Date of birth: 12 July 2003 (age 23)
- Place of birth: Barcelona, Spain
- Height: 1.93 m (6 ft 4 in)
- Position: Centre-back

Team information
- Current team: GKS Tychy
- Number: 45

Youth career
- Europa
- 2010–2019: Wisła Kraków

Senior career*
Years	Team	Apps	(Gls)
2019–2023	Wisła Kraków	6	(0)
2021–2022	→ Hutnik Kraków (loan)	28	(1)
2022–2023	→ Wieczysta Kraków (loan)	12	(1)
2023–2026	Hutnik Kraków	74	(4)
2026–	GKS Tychy	0	(0)

International career
2017–2018	Poland U15	6	(1)
2018–2019	Poland U16	6	(0)
2019–2020	Poland U17	5	(0)
2021	Poland U19	5	(1)
- * Club domestic league appearances and goals as of 23:19, 30 May 2026 (UTC)

Daniel Hoyo-Kowalski (born 12 July 2003) is a professional footballer who plays as a centre-back for II liga club GKS Tychy. Born in Spain, Hoyo-Kowalski represented Poland as a youth international.

== International career ==
Hoyo-Kowalski was born in Spain to a Spanish father and Polish mother. He moved to Poland in 2010 with his mother after his parents separated. He was a youth international for Poland, and he scored goals for the under-15 and under-19 teams.

== Honours ==
Wieczysta Kraków

- Polish Cup (Lesser Poland regionals): 2022–23
