= 2020–21 S.C. Farense season =

S.C. Farense
2020–21 season
- President: João Rodrigues
- Head coach: Jorge Costa
- Stadium: Estádio de São Luís
- Primeira Liga: 14th
- Taça de Portugal: Third round
Home colours	Away colours	Third colours

The 2020–21 S.C. Farense season is the club's 111th season in existence and the club's first consecutive season in the top flight of Portuguese football. In addition to the domestic league, S.C. Farense will participate in this season's editions of the Taça de Portugal and the Taça da Liga. The season covers the period from July 2020 to 30 June 2021.

== Players ==
=== Current squad ===
As of 24 February 2021

Note: Flags indicate national team as defined under FIFA eligibility rules; some limited exceptions apply. Players may hold more than one non-FIFA nationality.

No.	Pos.	Nation	Player
1	GK	ANG	Hugo Marques
4	DF	BRA	César Martins
5	MF	FRA	Amine Oudrhiri
6	MF	POR	Filipe Melo
7	FW	POR	Hugo Seco
9	FW	SRB	Nikola Stojiljković
10	FW	POR	Madi Queta
11	FW	ARG	Braian Mansilla
12	GK	BRA	Rafael Defendi
13	MF	GBS	Bura
14	MF	BRA	Fabrício Isidoro
17	DF	POR	Miguel Bandarra
20	FW	ANG	Djalma
23	MF	SCO	Ryan Gauld

No.	Pos.	Nation	Player
25	DF	POR	André Pinto
26	MF	FRA	Bilel Aouacheria
29	MF	BRA	Claudio Falcão
30	DF	BRA	Abner
33	GK	POR	Ricardo Velho
41	DF	BRA	Cássio Scheid
47	MF	BRA	Jonatan Lucca
77	FW	POR	Alvarinho
78	DF	POR	Alex Pinto
84	DF	POR	Tomás Tavares (on loan from Benfica)
88	FW	POR	Licá
92	FW	POR	Fábio Nunes
95	DF	BRA	Eduardo Mancha
96	FW	BRA	Pedro Henrique

=== Out on loan ===
Note: Flags indicate national team as defined under FIFA eligibility rules; some limited exceptions apply. Players may hold more than one non-FIFA nationality.

No.	Pos.	Nation	Player
18	MF	POR	Pedro Simões (at Louletano until 30 June 2021)
19	FW	CPV	Patrick (at Varzim until 30 June 2021)

No.	Pos.	Nation	Player
86	FW	POR	Ângelo Taveira (at Louletano until 30 June 2021)
—	MF	RSA	Mihlali Mayambela (at Académica until 30 June 2021)

== Pre-season and friendlies ==
Win Draw Loss

== Competitions ==
=== Overview ===
Competition	First match	Last match	Starting round	Final position	Record							
Competition	First match	Last match	Starting round	Final position	Pld	W	D	L	GF	GA	GD	Win %
Primeira Liga	20 September 2020	May 2021	Matchday 1		21	4	7	10	22	29	−7	19.05
Taça de Portugal	3 December 2020		Third round	Third round	1	0	0	1	0	2	−2	0.00
Total					22	4	7	11	22	31	−9	18.18

Last updated: 28 February 2021
Source: Soccerway

=== Primeira Liga ===
==== League table ====
Pos	Team	Pld	W	D	L	GF	GA	GD	Pts	Qualification or relegation
14	Portimonense	34	9	8	17	34	41	−7	35 (Note: Portimonense are ranked ahead of Marítimo on head-to-head points: Portimonense 4, Marítimo 1.)	
15	Marítimo	34	10	5	19	27	47	−20	35	
16	Rio Ave (R)	34	7	13	14	25	40	−15	34	Qualification for the Relegation play-offs
17	Farense (R)	34	7	10	17	31	48	−17	31	Relegation to Liga Portugal 2
18	Nacional (R)	34	6	7	21	30	59	−29	25	Relegation to Liga Portugal 2

Source: Liga Portugal
Rules for classification: 1) Points; 2) Head-to-head points; 3) Head-to-head goal difference; 4) Head-to-head away goals scored; 5) Goal difference; 6) Matches won; 7) Goals scored; 8) Play-off.
(R) Relegated

==== Results summary ====
Overall								Home						Away					
Pld	W	D	L	GF	GA	GD	Pts	W	D	L	GF	GA	GD	W	D	L	GF	GA	GD
34	7	10	17	31	48	−17	31	4	6	7	19	20	−1	3	4	10	12	28	−16

Last updated: 19 May 2021.
Source: Soccerway

==== Results by round ====
Round	1	2	3	4	5	6	7	8	9	10	11	12	13	14	15	16	17	18	19	20	21	22	23	24	25	26	27	28	29	30	31	32	33	34
Ground	A	H	A	H	H	A	H	A	H	A	H	A	H	A	H	A	H	H	A	H	A	A	H	A	H	A	H	A	H	A	H	A	H	A
Result	L	L	L	D	L	D	W	L	W	L	D	L	W	D	L	L	D	L	W	D	D	L	L	W	L	L	L	W	D	D	D	L	W	L
Position	16	18	18	18	18	18	16	18	14	17	15	18	13	15	16	17	16	16	14	15	17	17	17	17	17	17	17	17	17	17	17	17	17	17

Updated to match(es) played on 19 May 2021. Source:
A = Away; H = Home; W = Win; D = Draw; L = Loss

==== Matches ====
20 September 2020 1	Moreirense	2–0	Farense	Braga
18:30 WET (UTC±00:00)	Abreu 2', (yellow card) 37'; D'Alberto (yellow card) 30'; Pedro Nuno 55'	Report	Mansilla (yellow card) 22'; Defendi (red card) 49'; Isidoro (yellow card) 61'; Oudrhiri (yellow card) 85'; Bandarra (yellow card) 90+4'	Stadium: Parque de Jogos Comendador Joaquim de Almeida Freitas; Attendance: 0 Referee: João Bento

27 September 2020 2	Farense	0–1	Nacional	Faro
15:30 WET (UTC±00:00)	Mansilla (yellow card) 9'	Report	Kal (yellow card) 15'; Thill (yellow card) 23'; Freitas (yellow card) 51'; Riascos 58'; Borges (yellow card) 70'	Stadium: Estádio de São Luís; Attendance: 0 Referee: Gustavo Correira

4 October 2020 3	Benfica	3–2	Farense	Lisbon
18:30 WEST (UTC+01:00)	Pizzi 15'; Gabriel (yellow card) 50'; Otamendi (yellow card) 52'; Almeida (yellow card) 71'; Seferovic 79', 87'	Report	Nunes (yellow card) 34'; Lucca 54'; César (yellow card) 63'; Scheid (yellow card) 89'; Patrick 90+5'	Stadium: Estádio da Luz; Attendance: 0 Referee: Tiago Martins

18 October 2020 4	Farense	3–3	Famalicão	Faro
16:00 WEST (UTC+1)	Mancha 4'; César 25'; Pinto (yellow card) 44'; Mancha (yellow card) 49'; Mansilla 90+4'	Report	Herrera (yellow card) 61' (yellow-red card) 88'; Lameiras 65' (pen.), 73'; Jordão 80'	Stadium: Estádio de São Luís; Attendance: 0 Referee: André Narciso

25 October 2020 5	Farense	0–1	Rio Ave	Faro
15:00 WET (UTC±0)	Falcão (yellow card) 42'; Isidoro (yellow card) 65'; Mansilla (yellow card) 79'; Oudrhiri (yellow card) 84'	Report	Mané 20'; Filipe Augusto (yellow card) 25'; Ronan (yellow card) 32'; Borevković (yellow card) 46'; Diego Lopes (yellow card) 79'; Pelé (yellow card) 79'; Amaral (yellow card) 84'	Stadium: Estádio de São Luís; Attendance: 0 Referee: Manuel Oliveira

31 October 2020 6	Belenenses SAD	1–1	Farense	Lisbon
15:30 WEST (UTC+01:00)	Taira (yellow card) 45+1'; Lima (yellow card) 67'; Henrique (yellow card) 71'; Ramires 90+7'	Report	Gauld 69'; Henrique (red card) 90+1'	Stadium: Estádio Nacional; Attendance: 0 Referee: Manuel Mota

8 November 2020 7	Farense	3–1	Boavista	Faro
15:00 WET (UTC±00:00)	Gauld 22'; Abner (yellow card) 40'; Stojiljković 50'; Mancha 54'; Melo (yellow card) 67'; Mansilla (yellow card) 75'; Aouacheria (yellow card) 80'	Report	Gomes (yellow card) 10' (goal) 43'	Stadium: Estádio de São Luís; Attendance: 0 Referee: Vítor Ferreira

29 November 2020 8	Braga	1–0	Farense	Braga
20:00 WET (UTC±0)	Carmo (yellow card) 3'; Fransérgio (yellow card) 57'; Novais (yellow card) 79'; Elmusrati 87'	Report	Oudrhiri (yellow card) 47'; Falcão (yellow card) 80'; Gauld (yellow card) 90+2'	Stadium: Estádio Municipal de Braga; Attendance: 0 Referee: António Nobre

7 December 2020 9	Farense	2–1	Marítimo	Faro
20:15 WET (UTC±00:00)	Aouacheria 10'; Oudrhiri (yellow card) 33'; Isidoro (yellow card) 40'; Gauld 63'; Defendi (yellow card) 90+2'; Henrique (yellow card) 90+5'	Report	Milson (yellow card) 42' (yellow-red card) 67'; Guitane (yellow card) 56'; Rodrigo Pinho 60'; Jean Cléber (yellow card) 62'; Costa (yellow card) 88'	Stadium: Estádio de São Luís; Attendance: 0 Referee: Hugo Miguel

19 December 2020 10	Sporting CP	1–0	Farense	Lisbon
20:30 WET (UTC±0)	Tomás (yellow card) 26'; Palhinha (yellow card) 41'; Coates (yellow card) 68'; Šporar 90+1' (pen.); Santos (yellow card) 90+7'	Report	Defendi (yellow card) 36' (yellow-red card) 86'; Isidoro (yellow card) 43'; Nunes (yellow card) 75'; Mancha (yellow card) 83'	Stadium: Estádio José Alvalade; Attendance: 0 Referee: André Narciso

27 December 2020 11	Farense	1–1	Paços de Ferreira	Faro
17:30 WET (UTC±00:00)	Falcão (yellow card) 54'; Gauld (yellow card) 68', (goal) 74'; Oudrhiri (yellow card) 87'	Report	Marcelo (yellow card) 45+1'; Douglas 59', (yellow card) 90+2'; Eustáquio (yellow card) 66'; Diaby (yellow card) 81'; Maracás (yellow card) 90'; Fernando (yellow card) 90+4'	Stadium: Estádio de São Luís; Attendance: 0 Referee: Luís Godinho

4 January 2021 12	Portimonense	2–0	Farense	Lisbon
21:45 WET (UTC±0)	Willyan (yellow card) 55'; Luquinha (yellow card) 67'; Beto 71', 90+1'; Dener (yellow card) 88'	Report	Stojiljković (yellow card) 45+2'; Alex Pinto (yellow card) 57'	Stadium: Estádio José Alvalade; Attendance: 0 Referee: André Narciso

10 January 2021 13	Farense	3–1	Gil Vicente	Faro
15:00 WET (UTC±00:00)	Stojiljković 10'; Licá 15', (red card) 61'; Nunes (yellow card) 75'; Isidoro 84'	Report	Lourency 29'; Gonçalves (yellow card) 69'; Fernandes (yellow card) 89'	Stadium: Estádio de São Luís; Attendance: 0 Referee: Hugo Miguel

17 January 2021 14	Vitória de Guimarães	2–2	Farense	Guimarães
21:45 WET (UTC±0)	Pepelu 14'; Edwards 36'	Report	Gauld 21'; Alex Pinto (yellow card) 37' (yellow-red card) 59'; Abner (yellow card) 54'; Stojiljković 79'	Stadium: Estádio D. Afonso Henriques; Attendance: 0 Referee: João Pinheiro

25 January 2021 15	Farense	0–1	Porto	Faro
20:15 WET (UTC±0)	Nunes (yellow card) 89'	Report	Taremi 15'; Otávio (yellow card) 88'	Stadium: Estádio de São Luís; Attendance: 0 Referee: Manuel Mota

30 January 2021 16	Tondela	2–0	Farense	Tondela
18:00 WET (UTC±0)	Pedro 47'; Martínez (yellow card) 50'; Murillo (yellow card) 60'; Barbosa (yellow card) 78', (goal) 90+5'; Bebeto (yellow card) 85'; Niasse (yellow card) 90'	Report	André Pinto (yellow card) 29'	Stadium: Estádio João Cardoso; Attendance: 0 Referee: Luís Godinho

4 February 2021 17	Farense	1–1	Santa Clara	Faro
15:00 WET (UTC±0)	Gauld 40'	Report	Ramos (yellow card) 42'; Carlos 63', (yellow card) 76'; F. Cardoso (yellow card) 86'	Stadium: Estádio de São Luís; Attendance: 0 Referee: Vítor Ferreira

8 February 2021 18	Farense	1–2	Moreirense	Faro
17:00 WET (UTC±0)	Oudrhiri (yellow card) 36'; Gauld (yellow card) 61'; Henrique (yellow card) 75', (goal) 90+3'; Mansilla (yellow card) 81'	Report	Vitória (yellow card) 7'; Yan 28'; A. Soares (yellow card) 43'; Martins 79'; Camará (yellow card) 83'	Stadium: Estádio de São Luís; Attendance: 0 Referee: Iancu Vasilica

30 January 2021 19	Nacional	2–3	Farense	Funchal
18:00 WET (UTC±0)	Azouni (yellow card) 40'; Ramos (yellow card) 44'; Vigário 68'; Mendes 83'; Borges (yellow card) 84'; Correia (yellow card) 90+4'	Report	André Pinto 51'; Gauld 62'; Nunes (yellow card) 65'; Mendes 85' (o.g.)	Stadium: Estádio da Madeira; Attendance: 0 Referee: Rui Costa

21 February 2021 20	Farense	0–0	Benfica	Faro
20:15 WET (UTC±00:00)	Pedro Henrique (yellow card) 86'; Lucca (yellow card) 90+6'	Report	Gabriel (yellow card) 31'; Otamendi (yellow card) 89'	Stadium: Estádio de São Luís; Attendance: 0 Referee: Hugo Miguel

28 February 2021 21	Famalicão	0–0	Farense	Vila Nova de Famalicão
15:30 WET (UTC±0)	Ugarte (yellow card) 66'; Dias (yellow card) 73'	Report	André Pinto (yellow card) 39' (yellow-red card) 50'; Lucca (yellow card) 59'; Isidoro (yellow card) 76'; Tavares (yellow card) 90+3'; Gauld (yellow card) 90+4'	Stadium: Estádio Municipal 22 de Junho; Attendance: 0 Referee: Luís Godinho

7 March 2021 22	Rio Ave	2–0	Farense	Vila do Conde
20:00 WET (UTC±0)	Francisco Geraldes (yellow card) 22'; Pelé 27' (pen.); Rafael Camacho 70'; Ronan (yellow card) 82'	Report	Bura (yellow card) 84'	Stadium: Estádio dos Arcos; Attendance: 0 Referee: (Portugal) João Pinheiro (referee)

13 March 2021 23	Farense	0–1	Belenenses	Faro
15:30 WET (UTC±0)	Jonatan Lucca (yellow card) 50'	Report	Rúben Lima (yellow card) 7'; Tomás Ribeiro (yellow card) 15'; Phete (yellow card) 19'; Miguel Cardoso 78'; Sithole (yellow card) 83'	Stadium: Estádio de São Luís; Attendance: 0 Referee: (Portugal) Fábio Veríssimo

21 March 2021 24	Boavista	0–1	Farense	Porto
17:30 WET (UTC±0)	Paulinho (yellow card) 87'; Benguché (yellow card) 88'	Report	Licá 25'; Gauld (yellow card) 75'	Stadium: Estádio do Bessa; Attendance: 0 Referee: (Portugal) Hugo Miguel

5 April 2021 25	Farense	1–2	Sporting Braga	Faro
18:45 WET (UTC±0)	Pedro Henrique 34'	Report	Ali Musrati 29'; Borja (yellow card) 49'; Šporar 90+1'	Stadium: Estádio de São Luís; Attendance: 0 Referee: (Portugal) Rui Costa

10 April 2021 26	Marítimo	1–0	Farense	Funchal
15:00 WET (UTC±0)	Zainadine Júnior (yellow card) 3'; René (yellow card) 7'; Bambock (yellow card) 13'; Alipour 43'; Rúben Macedo (yellow card) 73'	Report	Jonatan Lucca (yellow card) 60'; Hugo Seco (yellow card) 78'; Djalma (yellow card) 79'	Stadium: Estádio do Marítimo; Attendance: 0 Referee: (Portugal) Manuel Mota

=== Taça de Portugal ===
3 December 2020 Third round	Estrela da Amadora	2–0	Farense	Amadora
14:30 WET (UTC±00:00)	Latón 15'; Horácio Jau 46'; Diogo Leitão (yellow card) 77'; Chapi Romano (yellow card) 81'	Report	Aouacheria (yellow card) 24'; Gauld (yellow card) 69'; Oudrhiri (yellow card) 77'	Stadium: Estádio José Gomes; Attendance: 0 Referee: Fabio Verssimo

== Statistics ==
=== Goalscorers ===
Rank	No.	Pos.	Player	Primeira Liga	Taça de Portugal	Taça da Liga	Total
1	23	MF	(Scotland) Ryan Gauld	7	0	0	7
2	9	FW	(Serbia) Nikola Stojiljković	3	0	0	3
3	95	DF	(Brazil) Eduardo Mancha	2	0	0	2
4	4	DF	(Brazil) César	1	0	0	1
4	11	FW	(Argentina) Braian Mansilla	1	0	0	1
4	17	MF	(Brazil) Fabrício Isidoro	1	0	0	1
4	25	DF	(Portugal) André Pinto	1	0	0	1
4	26	MF	(France) Bilel Aouacheria	1	0	0	1
4	47	MF	(Brazil) Jonatan Lucca	1	0	0	1
4	88	MF	(Portugal) Licá	1	0	0	1
4	93	FW	(Cape Verde) Patrick	1	0	0	1
4	96	FW	(Brazil) Pedro Henrique	1	0	0	1
Totals				22	0	0	22
