= 2023–24 Widzew Łódź season =

Widzew Łódź
2023–24 season
- Manager: Daniel Myśliwiec
- Stadium: Stadion Miejski Widzewa
- Ekstraklasa: 8th
- Polish Cup: Round of 16
- Top goalscorer: League: Bartłomiej Pawłowski; Jordi Sánchez (4 each); All: Jordi Sánchez (6)
- Average home league attendance: 17,186
- Biggest win: Concordia Elbląg 0–4 Widzew Łódź

The 2023–24 season is Widzew Łódź's 114th season in existence and second consecutive in the Polish top division Ekstraklasa. They are also competing in the Polish Cup.

== Players ==
=== First-team squad ===
As of 5 September 2023

Note: Flags indicate national team as defined under FIFA eligibility rules; some limited exceptions apply. Players may hold more than one non-FIFA nationality.

No.	Pos.	Nation	Player
1	GK	SVK	Henrich Ravas
2	DF	POR	Luís Silva
4	DF	POL	Mateusz Żyro
5	DF	POL	Serafin Szota
6	MF	ALB	Juljan Shehu
7	DF	CRO	Mato Miloš
8	MF	POL	Dawid Tkacz
9	FW	ESP	Jordi Sánchez
10	MF	ESP	Fran Álvarez
13	MF	POL	Ernest Terpiłowski
14	DF	LAT	Andrejs Cigaņiks
15	DF	ESP	Juan Ibiza
19	MF	POL	Bartłomiej Pawłowski
22	MF	POL	Dominik Kun

No.	Pos.	Nation	Player
23	DF	POL	Paweł Zieliński
25	MF	CZE	Marek Hanousek
33	GK	POL	Jan Krzywański
37	MF	GER	Sebastian Kerk
47	MF	POL	Antoni Klimek
72	DF	POL	Hubert Lenart
74	GK	POL	Jakub Szymanski
78	MF	POL	Kamil Cybulski
80	MF	POL	Filip Przybułek
88	MF	POL	Ignacy Dawid
92	DF	POR	Fábio Nunes
95	DF	POL	Patryk Stępiński
99	FW	BIH	Imad Rondić

=== Out on loan ===
Note: Flags indicate national team as defined under FIFA eligibility rules; some limited exceptions apply. Players may hold more than one non-FIFA nationality.

No. / Pos. / Nation / Player; — / MF / POL / Juliusz Letniowski (at Ruch Chorzów until 30 June 2024)	No. / Pos. / Nation / Player; — / MF / POL / Jakub Sypek (at Lechia Gdańsk until 30 June 2024)

== Transfers ==
=== In ===
Pos.	Player	Transferred from	Fee	Date	Source
MF	(Spain) Fran Álvarez	(Spain) Albacete	Free	1 July 2023	
MF	(Poland) Dawid Tkacz	(Poland) Górnik Łęczna	Free	1 July 2023	
MF	(Germany) Sebastian Kerk	(Germany) Hannover 96	Free	23 August 2023	
DF	(Spain) Juan Ibiza	(Spain) Ibiza	Free	4 September 2023	

=== Out ===
Pos.	Player	Transferred to	Fee	Date	Source
MF	(Poland)	(Poland)	Free	1 July 2023	

== Pre-season and friendlies ==
Win Draw Loss Fixtures

24 June 2023 Friendly	Widzew Łódź (Poland)	0–2	(Poland) Odra Opole
11:00

1 July 2023 Friendly	Widzew Łódź (Poland)	4–2	(Poland) Stal Rzeszow
11:00

1 July 2023 Friendly	Widzew Łódź (Poland)	0–0	(Poland) Resovia Rzeszów
16:00

7 July 2023 Friendly	Widzew Łódź (Poland)	1–0	(Poland) Górnik Łęczna
11:15

16 July 2023 Friendly	Wisła Płock (Poland)	1–1	(Poland) Widzew Łódź
11:30	Klimek 9'	Report	Szota 14'

== Competitions ==
=== Overall record ===
Competition	First match	Last match	Starting round	Record							
Competition	First match	Last match	Starting round	Pld	W	D	L	GF	GA	GD	Win %
Ekstraklasa	23 July 2023	25 May 2024	Matchday 1	16	6	4	6	21	21	+0	37.50
Polish Cup	26 September 2023		First round	2	2	0	0	8	1	+7	100.00
Total				18	8	4	6	29	22	+7	44.44

Last updated: 26 November 2023
Source: Soccerway

=== Ekstraklasa ===
==== League table ====
Pos	Team	Pld	W	D	L	GF	GA	GD	Pts
7	Raków Częstochowa	34	14	10	10	54	39	+15	52
8	Zagłębie Lubin	34	13	8	13	43	50	−7	47
9	Widzew Łódź	34	13	7	14	45	46	−1	46
10	Piast Gliwice	34	9	16	9	38	35	+3	43 (Note: Piast Gliwice finished ahead of Stal Mielec on head-to-head points: Stal Mielec 0–0 Piast Gliwice, Piast Gliwice 3–0 Stal Mielec)
11	Stal Mielec	34	11	10	13	42	48	−6	43

Source: ekstraklasa.org 90minut.pl
Rules for classification: 1) Points; 2) Head-to-head points; 3) Head-to-head goal difference; 4) Goal difference; 5) Goals scored; 6) Number of wins; 7) Number of away wins; 8) Lower number of points based on yellow and red cards (red card = 3 points, yellow card = 1 point, sending-off = 3 points - including 1 point for first yellow card); 9) Fairplay ranking; 10) Draw.
(Note: Head-to-head record is used only after all the matches between the teams in question have been played)

==== Results summary ====
Overall								Home						Away					
Pld	W	D	L	GF	GA	GD	Pts	W	D	L	GF	GA	GD	W	D	L	GF	GA	GD
16	6	4	6	21	21	0	22	5	0	2	9	6	+3	1	4	4	12	15	−3

Last updated: 26 November 2023.
Source: Ekstraklasa

==== Results by round ====
Round	1	2	3	4	5	6	7	8	9	10	11	12	13	14	15	16	17
Ground	H	A	A	H	A	H	A	H	A	A	H	H	A	H	A	A	H
Result	W	L	L	W	D	L	L	W	D	L	W	W	D	L	D	W	
Position																	

Updated to match(es) played on 26 November 2023. Source: Ekstraklasa
A = Away; H = Home; W = Win; D = Draw; L = Loss

==== Matches ====
23 July 2023 1	Widzew Łódź	3–2	Puszcza Niepołomice	Łódź
20:00 CEST (UTC+2)				Stadium: Stadion Miejski Widzewa

30 July 2023 2	Pogoń Szczecin	2–1	Widzew Łódź
20:00 CEST (UTC+2)

4 August 2023 3	Jagiellonia Białystok	2–1	Widzew Łódź
18:00 CEST (UTC+2)

12 August 2023 4	Widzew Łódź	1–0	ŁKS Łódź	Łódź
20:00 CEST (UTC+2)				Stadium: Stadion Miejski Widzewa

18 August 2023 5	Górnik Zabrze	1–1	Widzew Łódź
20:30 CEST (UTC+2)

25 August 2023 6	Widzew Łódź	0–2	Śląsk Wrocław	Łódź
20:30 CEST (UTC+2)				Stadium: Stadion Miejski Widzewa

3 September 2023 7	Legia Warsaw	3–1	Widzew Łódź
17:30 CEST (UTC+2)

17 September 2023 8	Widzew Łódź	2–0	MKS Cracovia	Łódź
15:00 CEST (UTC+2)				Stadium: Stadion Miejski Widzewa

22 September 2023 9	Korona Kielce	1–1	Widzew Łódź
18:00 CEST (UTC+2)

29 September 2023 10	Piast Gliwice	3–2	Widzew Łódź
20:30 CEST (UTC+2)

7 October 2023 11	Widzew Łódź	1–0	Stal Mielec	Łódź
15:00 CEST (UTC+2)				Stadium: Stadion Miejski Widzewa

29 October 2023 13	Raków Częstochowa	1–1	Widzew Łódź	Częstochowa
17:30 CET (UTC+1)				Stadium: Miejski Stadion Piłkarski "Raków"

4 November 2023 14	Widzew Łódź	0–1	Warta Poznań	Łódź
17:30 CET (UTC+1)				Stadium: Stadion Miejski Widzewa; Referee: Damian Kos

11 November 2023 15	Zagłębie Lubin	1–1	Widzew Łódź	Lubin
17:30 CET (UTC+1)	Dąbrowski (penalty missed) 59'; Wdowiak 60'		Rondić 90+9'	Stadium: Stadion Miejski; Referee: Daniel Stefanski

18 November 2023 12	Widzew Łódź	2–1	Ruch Chorzów	Łódź
17:30 CET (UTC+1)	Nunes 47'; Sánchez 87'		Bartolewski 16'	Stadium: Stadion Miejski Widzewa; Referee: Tomasz Kwiatkowski

26 November 2023 16	Lech Poznań	1–3	Widzew Łódź	Poznań
17:30 CET (UTC+1)	Karlström 88'		Sánchez (penalty missed) 7'; Álvarez 16'; Klimek 90+3'; Pawłowski 90+6'	Stadium: Stadion Poznań; Referee: Damian Sylwestrzak

2 December 2023 17	Widzew Łódź	v	Radomiak Radom	Łódź
17:30 CET (UTC+1)				Stadium: Stadion Miejski Widzewa

=== Polish Cup ===
26 September 2023 First round	Concordia Elbląg	0–4	Widzew Łódź
18:00 CEST (UTC+2)

8 November 2023 Round of 32	Wisła Puławy	1–4	Widzew Łódź
21:00 CET (UTC+1)

6 December 2023 Round_of_16	Stal Mielec	v	Widzew Łódź	Mielec
21:00 CET (UTC+1)				Stadium: Stadion Miejski
