= 2024–25 Widzew Łódź season =

Widzew Łódź
2024–25 season
- Manager: Patryk Czubak
- Stadium: Widzew Łódź Stadium
- Ekstraklasa: 6th
- Polish Cup: Round of 32
- Top goalscorer: League: Imad Rondić (5); All: Imad Rondić (5)
- Average home league attendance: 16,825
- Biggest win: Cracovia 1–3 Widzew Łódź
Home colours	Away colours	Third colours

The 2024–25 season will be the 114th season in the history of Widzew Łódź, and the club's third consecutive season in Ekstraklasa. In addition to the domestic league, the team is scheduled to participate in the Polish Cup.

== Transfers ==
=== In ===
Pos.	Player	Transferred from	Fee	Date	Source
FW	(Poland) Hubert Sobol	(Poland) KKS 1925 Kalisz		1 July 2024	
MF	(Poland) Jakub Łukowski	(Poland) Korona Kielce	Free	1 July 2024	
DF	(Kosovo) Kreshnik Hajrizi	(Switzerland) Lugano	Free	1 July 2024	
DF	(Slovakia) Samuel Kozlovský	(Slovakia) AS Trenčín		3 July 2024	
MF	(Nigeria) Hilary Gong	(Slovakia) AS Trenčín	Undisclosed	11 July 2024	
FW	(Bosnia and Herzegovina) Said Hamulić	(France) Toulouse	Loan	24 July 2024	

=== Out ===
Pos.	Player	Transferred to	Fee	Date	Source
MF	(Poland) Ernest Terpiłowski	(Poland) Polonia Warsaw	End of contract	1 July 2024	
DF	(Poland) Paweł Zieliński		End of contract	1 July 2024	
DF	(Poland) Serafin Szota	(Poland) Śląsk Wrocław	End of contract	1 July 2024	
MF	(Poland) Juliusz Letniowski	(Poland) Miedź Legnica	End of contract	1 July 2024	
MF	(Poland) Dawid Tkacz	(Poland) Stal Mielec	Loan	1 July 2024	
DF	(Latvia) Andrejs Cigaņiks	(Switzerland) FC Luzern		5 July 2024	
FW	(Spain) Jordi Sánchez	(Japan) Hokkaido Consadole Sapporo	Undisclosed	13 July 2024	

== Friendlies ==
=== Pre-season ===
22 June 2024 Friendly	Widzew Łódź (Poland)	3–1	(Poland) GKS Katowice	Łódź
12:00				Stadium: Widzew Łódź Stadium

29 June 2024 Friendly	Widzew Łódź (Poland)	1–2	(Poland) Motor Lublin	Łódź
12:00	Sobol 76' (pen.)		Śpiewak 100'; Orlik 106'	Stadium: Widzew Łódź Stadium
Note: 4 × 30 minutes

6 July 2024 Friendly	Widzew Łódź (Poland)	2–1	(Czech Republic) Baník Ostrava	Opalenica
11:00	Rondić 24' (pen.); Shehu 72'		Tanko 79'	Stadium: Hotel Remes Sport & Spa
Note: 4 x 30 minutes

12 July 2024 Friendly	Legia Warsaw (Poland)	2–1	(Poland) Widzew Łódź	Urszulin
11:30				Stadium: Legia Training Center
Note: 3 x 45 minutes

=== Mid-season ===
21 January 2025 Friendly	Widzew Łódź (Poland)	2–1	(Czech Republic) Dukla Prague
09:00

23 January 2025 Friendly	Widzew Łódź (Poland)	7–0	(Kosovo) Feronikeli 74
08:00

== Competitions ==
=== Overall record ===
Competition	First match	Last match	Starting round	Final position	Record							
Competition	First match	Last match	Starting round	Final position	Pld	W	D	L	GF	GA	GD	Win %
Ekstraklasa	22 July 2024	24–25 May 2025	Matchday 1	13th	34	11	7	16	38	49	−11	32.35
Polish Cup	9 September 2024	12 April 2025	First round	Quarter-final	3	1	1	1	6	5	+1	33.33
Total					37	12	8	17	44	54	−10	32.43

Last updated: 11 August 2024
Source: Soccerway

=== Ekstraklasa ===
==== League table ====
Pos	Team	Pld	W	D	L	GF	GA	GD	Pts
11	Korona Kielce	34	11	12	11	37	45	−8	45 (Note: Ranked based on head-to-head points: Piast Gliwice 4 pts, Korona Kielce - 1 pt.)
12	Radomiak Radom	34	11	8	15	48	52	−4	41
13	Widzew Łódź	34	11	7	16	38	49	−11	40
14	Lechia Gdańsk	34	10	7	17	44	59	−15	37
15	Zagłębie Lubin	34	10	6	18	33	51	−18	36

Source: ekstraklasa.org 90minut.pl
Rules for classification: 1) Points; 2) Head-to-head points; 3) Head-to-head goal difference; 4) Goal difference; 5) Goals scored; 6) Number of wins; 7) Number of away wins; 8) Lower number of points based on yellow and red cards (red card = 3 points, yellow card = 1 point, sending-off = 3 points - including 1 point for first yellow card); 9) Fairplay ranking; 10) Draw.
(Note: Head-to-head record is used only after all the matches between the teams in question have been played)

==== Results summary ====
Overall								Home						Away					
Pld	W	D	L	GF	GA	GD	Pts	W	D	L	GF	GA	GD	W	D	L	GF	GA	GD
34	11	7	16	38	49	−11	40	8	2	7	19	20	−1	3	5	9	19	29	−10

Last updated: 29 May 2025.

==== Results by round ====
Round	1	2	3	4	5	6	7	8	9	10	11	12	13	14	15	16	17	18	19	20	21	22	23	24	25	26	27	28	29	30	31	32	33	34
Ground	A	H	A	H	A	H	A	A	H	A	H	A	H	A	H	A	H	H	A	H	A	H	A	H	H	A	H	A	H	A	A	H	H	A
Result	D	W	W	D	L	W	L	D	W	D	L	W	L	L	W	L	L	W	L	D	L	L	D	L	W	W	W	L	L	D	L	L	W	L
Position	7	5	2	3	9	6	8	8	6	6	7	7	7	8	7	9	10	9	10	11	11	12	12	13	13	11	9	12	12	12	12	13	13	13

Updated to match(es) played on 11 August 2024. Source:
A = Away; H = Home; W = Win; D = Draw; L = Loss

==== Matches ====
22 July 2024 1	Stal Mielec	1–1	Widzew Łódź	Mielec
19:00	Esselink (yellow card) 19'; Shkurin 45+2'; Stępień (yellow card) 90+3'		Fernández (yellow card) 52' (yellow-red card) 80'; Łukowski 73'	Stadium: Mielec Stadium; Attendance: 6,446; Referee: Wojciech Myć

27 July 2024 2	Widzew Łódź	2–1	Lech Poznań	Łódź
20:15	Sypek 3'; Álvarez 10'		Ishak 42'	Stadium: Widzew Łódź Stadium; Referee: Szymon Marciniak

5 August 2024 3	Cracovia	1–3	Widzew Łódź	Kraków
19:00	Källman 4'		Łukowski 21'; Álvarez 84'; Rondić 90+12'	Stadium: Józef Piłsudski Cracovia Stadium; Referee: Jarosław Przybył

11 August 2024 4	Widzew Łódź	0–0	Śląsk Wrocław	Łódź
20:15	Kozlovský (red card) 65'		Ortiz (yellow card)	Stadium: Widzew Łódź Stadium; Referee: Karol Arys

17 August 2024 5	Pogoń Szczecin	2–0	Widzew Łódź	Szczecin
20:15				Stadium: Florian Krygier Municipal Stadium

23 August 2024 6	Widzew Łódź	3–2	Radomiak Radom	Łódź
18:00				Stadium: Widzew Łódź Stadium

1 September 2024 7	Jagiellonia Białystok	1–0	Widzew Łódź	Białystok
20:15				Stadium: Białystok Municipal Stadium

13 September 2024 8	GKS Katowice	2–2	Widzew Łódź	Katowice
20:30				Stadium: GKS Katowice Stadium

21 September 2024 9	Widzew Łódź	1–0	Piast Gliwice	Łódź
17:30				Stadium: Widzew Łódź Stadium

27 September 2024 10	Lechia Gdańsk	1–1	Widzew Łódź	Gdańsk
20:30				Stadium: Gdańsk Stadium

4 October 2024 11	Widzew Łódź	v	Korona Kielce	Łódź
20:30				Stadium: Widzew Łódź Stadium

=== Polish Cup ===
24 September 2024 First round	Elana Toruń	1–3	Widzew Łódź	Toruń
17:30 UTC+2				Stadium: Stadion Miejski im. Grzegorza Duneckiego; Referee: Marcin Szczerbowicz
