= Ivan Krajčírik =

Slovak under-21 international footballer

Personal information
- Full name: Ivan Krajčírik
- Date of birth: 15 June 2000 (age 26)
- Place of birth: Handlová, Slovakia
- Height: 1.89 m (6 ft 2 in)
- Position: Goalkeeper

Team information
- Current team: Ružomberok (on loan from Slovan Liberec)
- Number: 1

Youth career
- 2012: ŠK Demänová
- 2012–2014: Tatran Liptovský Mikuláš
- 2014–2021: Ružomberok

Senior career*
Years	Team	Apps	(Gls)
2017–2019	Ružomberok B	13	(0)
2017–2024	Ružomberok	87	(0)
2024–2025	Widzew Łódź	0	(0)
2024–2025	→ Slovan Liberec (loan)	7	(0)
2025–	Slovan Liberec	2	(0)
2026–	→ Ružomberok (loan)	8	(0)

International career
2017	Slovakia U17	4	(0)
2021–2022	Slovakia U21	7	(0)
- * Club domestic league appearances and goals as of 22 September 2026

Ivan Krajčírik (born 15 June 2000) is a Slovak professional footballer who plays as a goalkeeper for Slovak club Ružomberok on loan from Slovan Liberec.

== Club career ==
=== MFK Ružomberok ===
Krajčírik made his Fortuna Liga debut for Ružomberok against ViOn Zlaté Moravce on 14 October 2017.

=== Widzew Łódź ===
On 19 January 2024, Polish Ekstraklasa club Widzew Łódź announced the signing of Krajčírik on a two-and-a-half-year deal, for an undisclosed fee. During his first training session three days later, he damaged a collateral ligament in his knee, which prompted Widzew to bring in free agent Rafał Gikiewicz. Despite recovering by the end of February, Krajčírik made no appearances for the Polish side during the 2023–24 season.

After injuring his thigh in pre-season, Krajčírik missed the start of Widzew's 2024–25 campaign.

==== Loan to Slovan Liberec ====
On 7 August 2024, he sent on a season-long loan with an option to buy to Czech outfit Slovan Liberec.

=== Slovan Liberec ===
On 3 July 2025, Krajčírik signed a contract with Slovan Liberec until summer 2028.

==== Loan to Ružomberok ====
On 9 July 2026, Krajčírik joined Ružomberok on a one-year loan deal.

== International career ==
Krajčírik received his first senior national team nomination on 23 May 2022, when Štefan Tarkovič named his as an alternate ahead of four UEFA Nations League fixtures against Belarus, Azerbaijan and Kazakhstan. For the same June fixtures, he was also a member of U21 team ahead of a qualifier against Malta and a friendly against Romania.

== Honours ==
Individual

- Slovak Super Liga U–21 Team of the Season: 2021–22
