= Fran Álvarez =

Fran Álvarez may refer to:

- Fran Álvarez (footballer, born 1996), Spanish football defender
- Fran Álvarez (footballer, born 1998), Spanish football midfielder
