= Juljan Shehu =

Albanian footballer

Personal information
- Date of birth: 6 September 1998 (age 28)
- Place of birth: Tirana, Albania
- Height: 1.83 m (6 ft 0 in)
- Positions: Defensive midfielder; central midfielder

Team information
- Current team: Widzew Łódź
- Number: 6

Youth career
- 2011–2013: Olimpic
- 2013–2014: Partizani
- 2014–2017: Internacional

Senior career*
Years	Team	Apps	(Gls)
2017–2018	Paniliakos	21	(0)
2018–2019	Kastrioti	31	(4)
2019–2022	Laçi	98	(10)
2022–	Widzew Łódź	107	(9)

International career^{‡}
2019	Albania U21	8	(0)
2025–	Albania	17	(0)
- * Club domestic league appearances and goals as of 22 November 2026 ‡ National team caps and goals as of 19:09, 15 November 2026 (UTC)

Juljan Shehu (Albanian pronunciation: [juljan ʃɛhu]; born 6 September 1998) is an Albanian professional footballer who plays as a defensive midfielder for Ekstraklasa club Widzew Łódź, which he captains, and the Albania national team.

Shehu developed in the youth systems of Olimpic, Partizani Tirana and Internacionale Tirana before moving to Greece in 2017 to join third-tier club Paniliakos, where he began his senior career. He returned to Albania the following year, signing for Kastrioti, where he became a regular starter in the Kategoria Superiore. In 2019, he joined Laçi, making over 90 appearances and helping the club achieve consecutive top-four league finishes, including a second-place finish in 2021–22. He also featured in European qualifying competitions and helped Laçi reach the 2022 Albanian Cup final.

In June 2022, Shehu joined Polish Ekstraklasa side Widzew Łódź. He made over 70 appearances in his first three seasons with the club, earning a contract extension until 2028. In March 2025, he received his first call-up to the Albania national team and made his senior debut in the 2026 FIFA World Cup qualifiers under manager Sylvinho.

== Club career ==
=== Early career ===
Shehu was born in Tirana, Albania. He began his youth career with Olimpic in 2011, joining Partizani Tirana two years later before moving to Internacionale Tirana.

In 2017, Shehu moved to Greece to join third-tier club Paniliakos, making 21 appearances in the 2017–18 Gamma Ethniki season.

=== Kastrioti ===
On 9 August 2018, Shehu signed with Kastrioti, returning from Greece. He made his Kategoria Superiore debut on 18 August 2018, playing 61 minutes in a 1–0 away win over Luftëtari Gjirokastër in the opening match of the 2018–19 season. He scored his first goal for the club on 3 October against Tirana in a 3–2 home defeat.

A regular starter throughout the season, Shehu missed only a few matches. Kastrioti struggled in the first phase of the championship, recording just three wins and one draw in 18 matches by the end of the year, but improved after the winter break, losing only four of their next 18 matches, during which Shehu scored three more league goals; despite finishing with 42 points, the club placed second from bottom and were relegated to the Kategoria e Parë. Shehu also scored in a 4–2 home defeat to Partizani in the first leg of the Albanian Cup second round on 22 January 2019. He finished the season with 32 appearances and five goals in all competitions.

In July 2019, Shehu left Kastrioti for Laçi, remaining in Kategoria Superiore.

=== Laçi ===
Having attracted interest from fellow Kategoria Superiore clubs Partizani and Kukësi, Shehu chose Laçi and joined ahead of the 2019–20 season. He established himself as a regular starter. He made his European debut in the UEFA Europa League first qualifying round against Hapoel Be'er Sheva, playing the full 90 minutes in both legs on 11 and 18 July 2019, which ended in a 1–1 draw and a 1–0 defeat respectively, and receiving a yellow card in each match. He scored his first goal on 8 December in a 3–0 league win over Flamurtari. He added another goal on 15 June 2020, converting a penalty against Skënderbeu to secure a 1–1 draw on matchday 29, helping Laçi remain in contention for a European qualification spot. Laçi won six of their final seven league matches to finish third and qualify for European competition, with Shehu starting 33 league matches and receiving ten yellow cards during the season.

In the following season, Shehu featured in Laçi's UEFA Europa League second qualifying round match against Hapoel Be'er Sheva on 17 September 2020, playing the first half of a single-leg tie which Laçi lost 2–1 after conceding two late goals; the match was played behind closed doors due to COVID-19 restrictions. In the league, he made 32 appearances, scoring three goals and providing three assists as Laçi finished fourth and qualified for the newly established UEFA Europa Conference League. He was also named in the Kategoria Superiore Team of the Year for 2021 alongside teammate Regi Lushkja. In the Albanian Cup quarter-finals against Partizani on 17 March 2021, Shehu played the full 120 minutes of a goalless draw and converted his penalty in the shoot-out, helping Laçi win 4–3; the club were subsequently eliminated by Vllaznia in the semi-finals after a 1–0 defeat, with Shehu again playing the full match.

In the 2021–22 season, Shehu started both legs of the UEFA Europa Conference League first qualifying round against Montenegrin club Podgorica, as Laçi advanced after extra time, before playing the full 180 minutes in the following round against Romanian side Universitatea Craiova, helping his team progress 1–0 on aggregate. After receiving three yellow cards during the qualifying rounds, he missed the first leg of the third round against Anderlecht, in which Laçi lost 3–0, and played the full second leg as the club were eliminated following another defeat. Domestically, he made 33 league appearances and scored four goals as Laçi finished second behind Tirana, securing another European qualification place. In the Albanian Cup, Shehu made seven appearances and scored once as Laçi reached the final, where they lost 2–1 after extra time to Vllaznia on 31 May.

=== Widzew Łódź ===
On 10 June 2022, Shehu signed a two-year contract with Polish Ekstraklasa club Widzew Łódź. He made his Ekstraklasa debut on 17 July, coming on as a 72nd-minute substitute in a 2–1 away defeat to Pogoń Szczecin in the opening round of the 2022–23 Ekstraklasa season. Initially a rotational option, he made nine league appearances in the first half of the season but missed six matches through injury. In January 2023, he dismissed reports of a possible move back to Albania, stating that he wanted to earn more playing time at Widzew. With 12 rounds remaining, Widzew occupied third place in the league table. On 19 March, Shehu made his first start of the calendar year in a 2–1 home defeat to Lech Poznań, earning praise from Łódzki Sport for his performance. He subsequently became a regular starter, starting Widzew's remaining nine league matches, during which the team's form deteriorated sharply as they earned just one win and one draw in their final nine matches, and finished twelfth after also suffering five consecutive home defeats. Contemporary analysis attributed the decline partly to a loss of confidence following disappointing results, while the club's sporting director acknowledged that the squad could have benefited from further winter signings. His performances attracted praise from Polish media, which highlighted his growing importance in Widzew's midfield.

In the following 2023–24 season, Shehu began by registering a decisive assist in the Ekstraklasa opening matchday on 23 July 2023 in stoppage time (90+3') to secure a 3–2 victory against Puszcza Niepołomice. Shehu initially struggled for playing time, making three substitute appearances in the first seven league rounds, but regained a starting role following the appointment of Daniel Myśliwiec as head coach in September 2023. He made nine league appearances and provided one assist, while also featuring in Widzew's first two rounds of the Polish Cup, playing approximately 120 minutes as the club recorded two 4–0 victories to advance. He suffered a serious knee injury in a 1–1 draw against Zagłębie Lubin on 11 November, tearing his anterior cruciate ligament and undergoing surgery, which ruled him out for the remainder of the season. Despite the injury and his contract expiring in June 2024, Widzew extended his deal until June 2025, with an option for a further year. He returned to the matchday squad for the final league fixture but remained unused, finishing the season with 11 appearances across all competitions as Widzew ended the league campaign in mid-table.

Shehu began the 2024–25 season mainly as a substitute, but established himself in the starting line-up in September 2024 and became one of Widzew's most consistent performers in the Ekstraklasa. He scored his first goal for the club on 28 February 2025, opening the scoring in a 1–1 away draw against Radomiak Radom, whose equaliser came in the final minute. He then scored in three consecutive league matches, doubling the lead in a 2–0 away win over Piast Gliwice on 28 March, opening the scoring in a 2–0 victory against Lechia Gdańsk on 4 April and briefly equalising in a 2–1 defeat to Korona Kielce on 11 April. He finished the campaign with 31 league appearances and four goals, all scored in the second half of the season, and 11 yellow cards; WidzewToMy rated him the club's best-performing midfielder during the spring campaign. Despite his performances, Widzew finished thirteenth after having occupied third place earlier in the season, amid an inconsistent campaign in which the club appointed three different managers: Daniel Myśliwiec, interim coach Patryk Czubak and Željko Sopić.

Shehu scored his first league goal of the 2025–26 season on 9 August 2025, opening the scoring in a 1–1 draw against Wisła Płock. He also scored in a 3–2 away defeat to Górnik Zabrze on 21 September, briefly equalising in the 27th minute. On 24 September, he scored a stoppage-time equaliser in a 2–2 draw against Bruk-Bet Termalica Nieciecza in the first round of the 2025–26 Polish Cup, before converting the decisive penalty in the shoot-out as Widzew advanced. On 3 October, Shehu signed a new contract with Widzew until June 2028, with an option for a further year. At the time, he had made 78 appearances and scored eight goals for the club, with sporting director Mindaugas Nikolicius describing him as one of the team's key figures and a leader on and off the pitch. On 23 November, he scored Widzew's only goal in a 3–1 home defeat to Korona Kielce. Shehu finished the league campaign with four goals and three assists in 32 appearances, starting 31 matches and playing 2,660 minutes, while Widzew placed fourteenth with 42 points. He also recorded 231 duels won, the highest total in the league.

Shehu was named Widzew's captain ahead of the 2026–27 season by head coach Aleksandar Vuković, with Bartłomiej Drągowski appointed vice-captain. He captained the team in its first four league matches before Vuković rotated the role to Drągowski for the fifth-round fixture against Śląsk Wrocław on 24 August. Shehu subsequently missed five matches due to a thigh muscle injury, returning to action with the Albania national team during the September–October international break.

== International career ==
Shehu represented the Albania under-21 during 2019, making five appearances in the UEFA European Under-21 Championship qualifiers and featuring in three friendly matches that year.

In March 2025, following his performances with Widzew Łódź, Shehu received his first call-up to the senior national team from coach Sylvinho for 2026 FIFA World Cup qualifying matches against England and Andorra. He made his debut on 24 March 2025, starting as a defensive midfielder in a 3–0 home win over Andorra. He established himself as a regular starter during the qualifying campaign, appearing in five further group matches and playing all but six minutes across those appearances, as Albania remained unbeaten in his six appearances, recording four wins and two draws, and finished second in Group K to reach the play-offs for the first time in its history. In the play-off semi-final against Poland on 26 March 2026, Shehu started and played the full match as Albania lost 2–1, having initially taken the lead, and were eliminated.

== Career statistics ==
=== Club ===
As of match played 22 November 2026

Appearances and goals by club, season and competition
Club	Season	League			National cup (Note: Includes Albanian Cup, Polish Cup)		Continental		Other		Total	
Club	Season	Division	Apps	Goals	Apps	Goals	Apps	Goals	Apps	Goals	Apps	Goals
Paniliakos	2017–18	Gamma Ethniki	21	0	0	0	—		—		21	0
Kastrioti	2018–19	Kategoria Superiore	31	4	1	1	—		—		32	5
Laçi	2019–20	Kategoria Superiore	33	2	2	0	2 (Note: Appearance(s) in UEFA Europa League)	0	—		37	2
Laçi	2020–21	Kategoria Superiore	32	3	2	0	1	0	—		35	3
Laçi	2021–22	Kategoria Superiore	33	4	7	1	5 (Note: Appearances in UEFA Europa Conference League)	0	—		45	5
Laçi	Total		98	10	11	1	8	0	0	0	117	11
Widzew Łódź	2022–23	Ekstraklasa	24	0	0	0	—		—		24	0
Widzew Łódź	2023–24	Ekstraklasa	9	0	2	0	—		—		11	0
Widzew Łódź	2024–25	Ekstraklasa	31	4	1	0	—		—		32	4
Widzew Łódź	2025–26	Ekstraklasa	32	4	4	1	—		—		36	5
Widzew Łódź	2026–27	Ekstraklasa	11	1	0	0	—		—		11	1
Widzew Łódź	Total		107	9	7	1	0	0	0	0	114	10
Career total			257	23	19	3	8	0	0	0	284	26

=== International ===
As of match played 15 November 2026

Appearances and goals by national team, year and competition
Team	Year	Competitive		Friendly		Total	
Team	Year	Apps	Goals	Apps	Goals	Apps	Goals
Albania U21	2019	5	0	3	0	8	0
Albania U21	Total	5	0	3	0	8	0
Albania	2025	6	0	1	0	7	0
Albania	2026	8	0	2	0	10	0
Albania	Total	14	0	3	0	17	0
Career total		19	0	6	0	25	0
