= Fábio Nunes (Portuguese footballer) =

Portuguese footballer

Personal information
- Full name: Fábio Alexandre da Silva Nunes
- Date of birth: 24 July 1992 (age 34)
- Place of birth: Portimão, Portugal
- Height: 1.80 m (5 ft 11 in)
- Positions: Left-back; winger

Youth career
- 2001–2005: Portimonense
- 2005–2006: Benfica
- 2006–2012: Portimonense
- 2010–2011: → Porto (loan)
- 2011–2012: → Parma (loan)

Senior career*
Years	Team	Apps	(Gls)
2010–2012	Portimonense	1	(0)
2012–2014	Blackburn Rovers	7	(0)
2014	Latina	2	(0)
2014–2016	Belenenses	33	(2)
2016–2017	Tondela	2	(0)
2017	Belenenses	13	(0)
2017–2018	Kerkyra	8	(3)
2018–2021	Farense	67	(5)
2021–2025	Widzew Łódź	78	(4)

International career
2009	Portugal U17	1	(0)
2009–2010	Portugal U18	7	(2)
2010–2011	Portugal U19	12	(1)
2012	Portugal U20	5	(1)
2012–2013	Portugal U21	2	(0)
- * Club domestic league appearances and goals as of 14:49, 27 May 2025 (UTC)

Fábio Alexandre da Silva Nunes (born 24 July 1992) is a Portuguese professional footballer who plays as a left-back or left winger.

== Club career ==
Born in Portimão, Algarve, Nunes played youth football for four clubs, including local Portimonense S.C. from ages 9 to 13 and 14 to 18. On 17 January 2010, whilst still a junior, he made his professional debut, coming on as a second-half substitute in a 2–1 home win against G.D. Estoril Praia in the Segunda Liga. He spent the 2011–12 season on loan at Parma FC, but only appeared for the Primavera side.

In the 2012 summer transfer window, Nunes signed a three-year contract with Blackburn Rovers for an undisclosed fee. He made his debut in the Football League Championship on 22 August, starting in the 2–1 home victory over Hull City.

On 24 January 2014, after only eight competitive appearances, Nunes returned to Italy by joining Serie B team US Latina Calcio on a free transfer. In July, he returned to his country and moved to C.F. Os Belenenses.

Nunes appeared in 17 Primeira Liga games in his debut campaign, having renewed his link in December 2014 until June 2017. His first goal in the Portuguese top division came on 9 May 2015, as he scored a last-minute equaliser in a 1–1 away draw against Académica de Coimbra.

In January 2017, following a very brief spell with C.D. Tondela, Nunes returned to the Estádio do Restelo. In the ensuing summer, the free agent agreed to a two-year deal at PAE Kerkyra of Super League Greece; seriously injured in the adductor muscle during his spell, he took the club to court for unpaid wages, with FIFA ultimately deciding in the player's favour.

Nunes returned to Portugal and its second tier on 17 July 2018, joining newly-promoted S.C. Farense. He scored twice from 23 matches in 2019–20 in a return to the top flight after an 18-year absence, subsequently penning a one-year extension.

On 28 July 2021, Nunes signed with Widzew Łódź in the Polish I liga on a two-year contract. He won promotion to the Ekstraklasa in his first season. After making 86 appearances across four seasons, he was released in June 2025 as a free agent.

== International career ==
Across five age groups, Nunes won 27 caps for Portugal at youth level. His first match with the under-21s occurred on 15 October 2012, as he played the full 90 minutes in a 0–1 friendly home loss to Ukraine.

== Career statistics ==
As of match played 24 May 2025

Appearances and goals by club, season and competition
Club	Season	League			National cup (Note: Includes Taça de Portugal, Greek Football Cup, Polish Cup)		League cup (Note: Includes EFL Cup, Taça da Liga)		Continental		Total	
Club	Season	Division	Apps	Goals	Apps	Goals	Apps	Goals	Apps	Goals	Apps	Goals
Portimonense	2009–10	Liga de Honra	1	0	0	0	0	0	—		1	0
Porto (loan)	2010–11	Primeira Liga	0	0	0	0	0	0	0	0	0	0
Parma (loan)	2011–12	Serie A	0	0	0	0	—		—		0	0
Blackburn Rovers	2012–13	Championship	6	0	0	0	1	0	—		7	0
Blackburn Rovers	2013–14	Championship	1	0	0	0	0	0	—		1	0
Blackburn Rovers	Total		7	0	0	0	1	0	—		8	0
Latina	2013–14	Serie B	2	0	0	0	—		—		2	0
Belenenses	2014–15	Primeira Liga	17	2	3	2	4	0	—		24	4
Belenenses	2015–16	Primeira Liga	16	0	1	0	4	0	5 (Note: Appearances in UEFA Europa League)	0	26	0
Belenenses	Total		33	2	4	2	8	0	5	0	50	4
Tondela	2016–17	Primeira Liga	2	0	0	0	1	0	—		3	0
Belenenses	2016–17	Primeira Liga	13	0	0	0	0	0	—		13	0
Kerkyra	2017–18	Super League Greece	8	3	1	0	—		—		9	3
Farense	2018–19	LigaPro	22	3	1	0	0	0	—		23	3
Farense	2019–20	LigaPro	23	2	3	1	1	0	—		27	3
Farense	2020–21	Primeira Liga	22	0	0	0	—		—		22	0
Farense	Total		67	5	4	1	1	0	—		72	6
Widzew Łódź	2021–22	I liga	24	2	3	0	—		—		27	2
Widzew Łódź	2022–23	Ekstraklasa	14	0	1	0	—		—		15	0
Widzew Łódź	2023–24	Ekstraklasa	33	2	4	2	—		—		37	4
Widzew Łódź	2024–25	Ekstraklasa	7	0	0	0	—		—		7	0
Widzew Łódź	Total		78	4	8	2	—		—		86	6
Career total			211	14	17	5	11	0	5	0	244	19
