= Ângelo Taveira =

Portuguese footballer

Personal information
- Full name: Ângelo Rafael Oliveira Sousa Taveira
- Date of birth: 13 May 2000 (age 26)
- Place of birth: Odiáxere, Portugal
- Height: 1.83 m (6 ft 0 in)
- Positions: Winger; right-back

Team information
- Current team: SK Kladno (on loan from Jablonec)

Youth career
- 2010–2012: Odiáxere
- 2012–2013: Futsal
- 2014–2018: Odiáxere
- 2018–2019: Farense

Senior career*
Years	Team	Apps	(Gls)
2019–2023	Farense	2	(0)
2020–2021	→ Louletano (loan)	19	(1)
2023	Portimonense	0	(0)
2024	União Santarém	6	(1)
2024–2025	SC Pombal	21	(1)
2025–2026	FK Varnsdorf	16	(0)
2026–	FK Jablonec	0	(0)
2026–	→ SK Kladno (loan)	0	(0)
- * Club domestic league appearances and goals as of 00:35, 13 January 2026 (UTC)

Ângelo Rafael Oliveira Sousa Taveira (born 13 May 2000) is a Portuguese professional footballer who plays as a winger or right-back for Bohemian Football League club SK Kladno, on loan from Jablonec.

== Football career ==
He made his LigaPro debut for Farense on 25 August 2019 in a game against Porto B. In January 2020, Taveira was loaned out to Louletano for the rest of the season.

On 18 July 2023, Taveira signed a four-year contract with Portimonense, one of Farense's regional rivals. Five months later, his contract was terminated by mutual agreement, having failed to make an appearance for the club's main team.
