= Luís Silva (footballer, born 1999) =

Portuguese footballer (born 1999)

Personal information
- Full name: Luís Marques Almeida Vieira da Silva
- Date of birth: 18 February 1999 (age 27)
- Place of birth: Oeiras, Portugal
- Height: 1.86 m (6 ft 1 in)
- Positions: Centre-back; left-back

Youth career
- 2007–2015: Benfica
- 2015–2018: Stoke City

Senior career*
Years	Team	Apps	(Gls)
2018–2021	Belenenses SAD	3	(0)
2021–2023	Enosis Neon Paralimni	69	(7)
2023–2025	Widzew Łódź	46	(1)
2025–2026	Anorthosis Famagusta	4	(0)
2026	GKS Tychy	14	(0)

International career
2015	Portugal U16	6	(0)
2015–2016	Portugal U17	10	(0)
2017	Portugal U18	4	(0)
2018	Portugal U19	3	(1)
2017–2019	Portugal U20	8	(2)
Medal record
Men's football
Representing Portugal
UEFA Euro U-17
Winner	2016 Azerbaijan
- * Club domestic league appearances and goals as of 15:40, 26 May 2026 (UTC)

Luís Marques Almeida Vieira da Silva (born 18 February 1999) is a Portuguese professional footballer who plays as a centre-back or left-back.

== Club career ==
Born in Oeiras, Silva came through the ranks at Benfica's youth system, becoming captain of the U16 team. On 1 July 2015, he joined Premier League club Stoke City, then went on to play across their U18 and U23 teams.

On 28 December 2018, Silva made his professional debut with Belenenses in a 2018–19 Taça da Liga match against Porto.

On 21 July 2021, he moved to Enosis Neon Paralimni in Cyprus.

On 15 June 2023, Silva signed for Ekstraklasa club Widzew Łódź on a two-year contract with the option for a further year. He left the club upon the expiration of his contract at the conclusion of the 2024–25 season.

On 31 July 2025, Silva returned to Cyprus to join Anorthosis Famagusta. Five months later, he returned to Poland, joining I liga club GKS Tychy on a contract until June 2028. He was released from the club after the 2025–26 season ended.

== International career ==
Silva represented Portugal at numerous youth levels. In 2016, he was part of the Portugal U17 team that won the UEFA European Under-17 Championship held in Azerbaijan.

== Honours ==
Portugal U17

- UEFA European Under-17 Championship: 2016
