= Pedro Henrique (footballer, born 1996) =

Brazilian footballer

Personal information
- Full name: Pedro Henrique Alves de Almeida
- Date of birth: 8 November 1996 (age 30)
- Place of birth: Goiás, Brazil
- Height: 1.88 m (6 ft 2 in)
- Position: Forward

Team information
- Current team: Cuiabá
- Number: 96

Senior career*
Years	Team	Apps	(Gls)
2016–2018	Anápolis	12	(3)
2017	→ Grêmio Anápolis (loan)		
2017	→ Atlético Goianiense (loan)	1	(0)
2018	Grêmio Anápolis		
2018–2019	Leixões	10	(7)
2019–2020	Benfica B	18	(3)
2020	→ Feirense (loan)	7	(3)
2020–2023	Farense	88	(22)
2023–2024	Radomiak Radom	19	(8)
2024	Wuhan Three Towns	21	(12)
2024–2025	Khor Fakkan	6	(2)
2025	Yunnan Yukun	29	(11)
2026	Vitória	0	(0)
2026	Cuiabá	14	(1)
- * Club domestic league appearances and goals as of 18 November 2026

Pedro Henrique Alves de Almeida (born 8 November 1996), commonly known as Pedro Henrique, is a Brazilian professional footballer who plays as a forward for Cuiabá.

== Club career ==
On 6 February 2024, Radomiak Radom announced that Henrique would be transferring to Chinese Super League club Wuhan Three Towns.

On 1 January 2026, Yunnan Yukun announced Henrique's departure after the 2025 season.

On 31 January 2026, Henrique signed Brazilian Série A club Vitória with a one year contract.

== Career statistics ==
As of match played 18 November 2026

Appearances and goals by club, season and competition
Club	Season	League			State league		National cup (Note: Includes Copa do Brasil, Taça de Portugal, Polish Cup, Chinese FA Cup, UAE President's Cup)		League cup (Note: Includes Taça da Liga)		Other		Total	
Club	Season	Division	Apps	Goals	Apps	Goals	Apps	Goals	Apps	Goals	Apps	Goals	Apps	Goals
Anápolis	2016	Série D	7	1	0	0	0	0	—		—		7	1
Anápolis	2017	Série D	5	2	11 (Note: Appearances in the Campeonato Goiano)	3	0	0	—		—		16	5
Anápolis	2018	Série D	0	0	12	3	0	0	—		—		12	3
Anápolis	Total		12	3	23	6	0	0	0	0	0	0	35	9
Atlético Goianiense (loan)	2017	Série A	1	0	—		—		—		—		1	0
Leixões	2018–19	LigaPro	10	7	—		3	2	—		—		13	9
Benfica B	2018–19	LigaPro	9	1	—		—		—		—		9	1
Benfica B	2019–20	LigaPro	9	2	—		—		—		—		9	2
Benfica B	Total		18	3	—		—		—		—		18	3
Feirense (loan)	2019–20	LigaPro	7	3	—		—		—		—		7	3
Farense	2020–21	Primeira Liga	26	5	—		0	0	—		—		26	5
Farense	2021–22	Liga Portugal 2	31	9	—		2	3	2	1	—		35	13
Farense	2022–23	Liga Portugal 2	31	8	—		1	0	3	2	—		35	10
Farense	Total		88	22	—		3	3	5	3	—		96	28
Radomiak Radom	2023–24	Ekstraklasa	19	8	—		1	0	—		—		20	8
Wuhan Three Towns	2024	Chinese Super League	21	12	—		1	0	—		—		22	12
Khor Fakkan	2024–25	UAE Pro League	6	2	—		1	0	—		—		7	2
Yunnan Yukun	2025	Chinese Super League	29	11	—		3	2	—		—		32	13
Vitória	2026	Série A	-											
Cuiabá	2026	Série B	14	1	—		—		—		—		14	1
Career total			225	72	23	6	12	7	5	3	0	0	273	88
