= Rafael Defendi =

Brazilian footballer

Personal information
- Full name: Rafael Garcia Tonioli Defendi
- Date of birth: 22 December 1983 (age 42)
- Place of birth: Ribeirão Preto, Brazil
- Height: 1.91 m (6 ft 3 in)
- Position: Goalkeeper

Team information
- Current team: Vila Meã
- Number: 1

Youth career
- 2001: Botafogo
- 2003: Santos

Senior career*
Years	Team	Apps	(Gls)
2004–2006	Flamengo		
2007	Flamengo		
2007	Grêmio Anápolis		
2007−2008	Aves	6	(0)
2008	Grêmio Anápolis		
2009	Sertãozinho		
2009−2010	Mirassol	2	(0)
2010−2011	Bragantino	2	(0)
2011−2012	Audax	5	(0)
2012	Monte Azul		
2013−2014	Bragantino	13	(0)
2014–2018	Paços de Ferreira	78	(0)
2018–2020	Famalicão	40	(0)
2020–2023	Farense	53	(0)
2023–	Vila Meã	1	(0)
- * Club domestic league appearances and goals as of 18:24, 7 November 2023 (UTC)

Rafael Garcia Tonioli Defendi (born 22 December 1983) is a Brazilian professional footballer who plays as a goalkeeper for Campeonato de Portugal club Vila Meã.

== Career ==
Born in Ribeirão Preto, São Paulo, Defendi passed through Botafogo de Futebol e Regatas and Santos F.C. youth systems, in his early career. In 2007, he made his first move abroad and joined C.D. Aves, making his professional debut on 18 August 2007 in a 2–1 home loss against S.C. Olhanense. He only added six league appearances throughout the season before returning to Brazil.

After several years in his home country, mostly at the regional level, in July 2014, Defendi returned to Portugal, joining Paços de Ferreira, being first choice most of the season, battling with António Filipe for the position.

On 9 July 2018, Defendi signed a two-year deal with LigaPro side F.C. Famalicão. He played all but one game in his first season as they finished runners-up and were promoted to the top flight after a 25-year absence; on 3 March 2019 he and Capela were sent off in a 1–1 home draw with FC Porto B.

== Personal life ==
He is the older brother of Rodrigo Defendi, also a professional footballer.
