= Jakub Łukowski =

Polish footballer

Personal information
- Full name: Jakub Łukowski
- Date of birth: 25 May 1996 (age 30)
- Place of birth: Bydgoszcz, Poland
- Height: 1.72 m (5 ft 7 1/2 in)
- Position: Winger

Team information
- Current team: Zawisza Bydgoszcz

Senior career*
| Years | Team | Apps | (Gls) |
| 2013–2016 | Zawisza Bydgoszcz | 29 | (2) |
| 2016–2019 | Wisła Płock | 3 | (0) |
| 2016–2017 | → Olimpia Grudziądz (loan) | 22 | (5) |
| 2019 | Olimpia Grudziądz | 6 | (2) |
| 2019–2021 | Miedź Legnica | 41 | (6) |
| 2021–2024 | Korona Kielce | 93 | (27) |
| 2024–2025 | Widzew Łódź | 27 | (3) |
| 2025–2026 | GKS Katowice | 4 | (0) |
| 2026 | Polonia Bytom | 10 | (0) |
| 2026– | Zawisza Bydgoszcz | 0 | (0) |

International career
| 2013–2014 | Poland U18 | 8 | (1) |
| 2014–2015 | Poland U19 | 8 | (1) |
| 2015–2017 | Poland U20 | 3 | (0) |
- * Club domestic league appearances and goals as of 08:46, 27 May 2026 (UTC)

Jakub Łukowski (born 25 May 1996) is a Polish professional footballer who plays as a winger for II liga club Zawisza Bydgoszcz.
