= Nuno Borges (footballer) =

Cape Verdean footballer

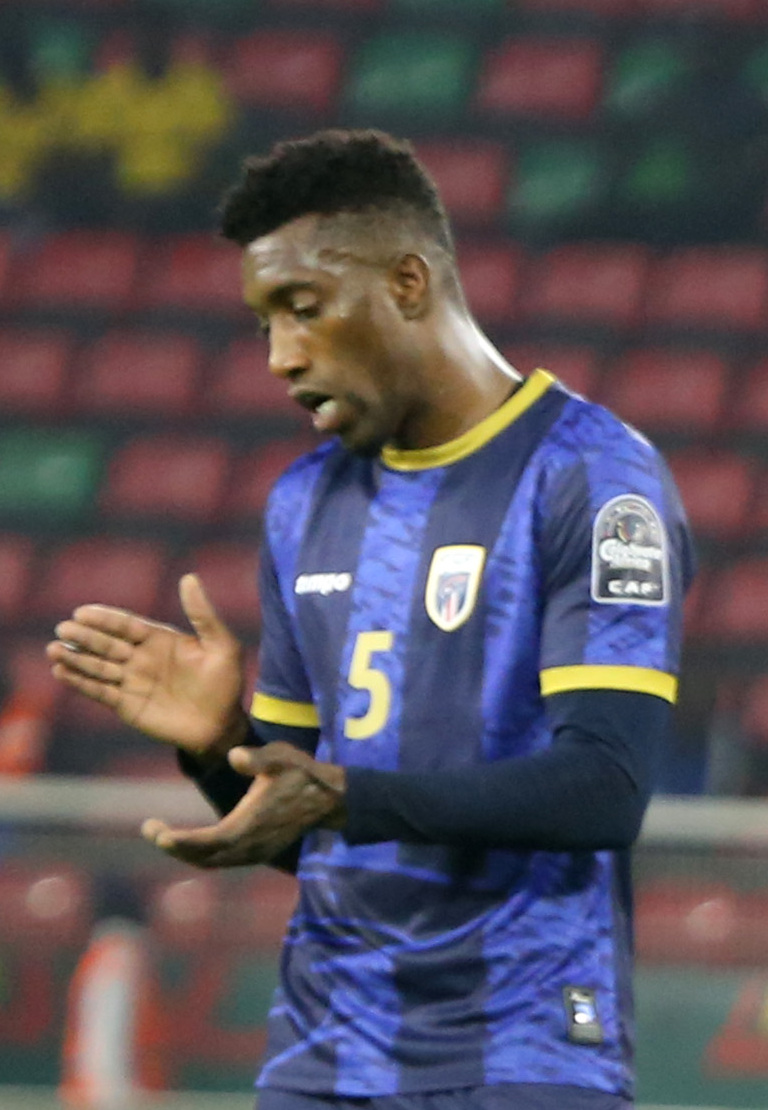
- Borges in 2022

Personal information
- Full name: Nuno Miguel Oliveira Borges
- Date of birth: 31 March 1988 (age 38)
- Place of birth: Agualva-Cacém, Portugal
- Height: 1.84 m (6 ft 0 in)
- Position: Midfielder

Youth career
- 1998–2005: Atlético Cacém
- 2005–2006: Farense

Senior career*
Years	Team	Apps	(Gls)
2006–2008	GDC Salgados		
2012–2014	SRD Negrais		
2014–2015	Igreja Nova		
2015–2018	Sacavenense	72	(12)
2018–2019	Farense	40	(3)
2019–2021	Nacional	40	(1)
2021–2023	Casa Pia	23	(0)

International career^{‡}
2018–	Cape Verde	13	(0)
- * Club domestic league appearances and goals as of 14:23, 20 October 2022 (UTC) ‡ National team caps and goals as of 14:23, 20 October 2022 (UTC)

Nuno Miguel Oliveira Borges (born 31 March 1988) is a Cape Verdean professional footballer who plays as a midfielder.

== Club career ==
Borges rejoined his youth club Farense on 29 January 2018, as a late reinforcement.

== International career ==
Borges made his debut for the Cape Verde national football team in a 0-0 (4-3) penalty shootout win over Andorra on 3 June 2018. He was named in the roster for the 2021 Africa cup of nations 2021 when the team reached the round of 16.
