= 2022 Albanian Cup final =

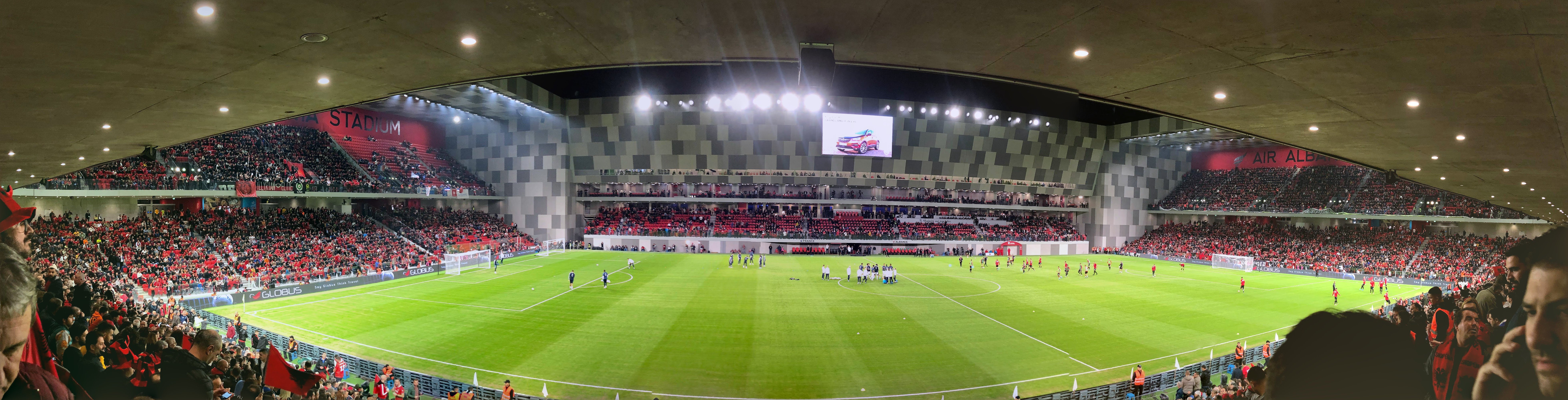
- The match was played at the Arena Kombëtare in Tirana
- Event: 2021–22 Albanian Cup
Vllaznia	Laçi
2	1
- After extra time
- Date: 31 May 2022
- Venue: Arena Kombëtare, Tirana
- Referee: Juxhin Xhaja

The 2022 Albanian Cup final was a football match that was played on 31 May 2022 to decide the winner of the 2021–22 Albanian Cup, the 70th edition of the Albanian Cup. The match was played between Vllaznia and Laçi at the Arena Kombëtare in Tirana. Vllaznia won the match 2−1 after extra time to earn their eighth Albanian Cup title.

== Match ==
=== Details ===
31 May 2022
19:00

Vllaznia	2–1 (a.e.t.)	Laçi
Hoxhaj 18'; Adili 95'		Guindo 4'

Arena Kombëtare, Tirana
Referee: Juxhin Xhaja
