= Fran Álvarez (footballer, born 1996) =

Spanish footballer

Personal information
- Full name: Francisco Javier Álvarez Ferrer
- Date of birth: 4 September 1996 (age 30)
- Place of birth: Tarragona, Spain
- Height: 1.75 m (5 ft 9 in)
- Position: Left back

Youth career
- Cusa La Granja
- 2004–2015: Barcelona

Senior career*
Years	Team	Apps	(Gls)
2015–2016	Monaco B	4	(0)
2017	La Roda	3	(0)
2017	Monterosi	6	(0)
2018	Vilafranca	12	(0)
2018–2019	Getafe B	22	(0)
2019	Viterbese	0	(0)
2020	Schaffhausen	0	(0)
2021	KTP	6	(1)
2022	Granollers	7	(0)
- * Club domestic league appearances and goals as of 1 May 2022

Francisco Javier "Fran" Álvarez Ferrer (born 4 September 1996) is a Spanish professional footballer who plays as a left back.

== Career ==
As a youth player, Álvarez joined the youth academy of Barcelona, but left due to injury.

On 4 March 2021, Álvarez debuted for KTP during a 6–1 defeat to HJK. On 14 May 2021, he scored his first goal for KTP in a 3–0 win over Haka.

== Career statistics ==
As of match played 10 June 2021

Appearances and goals by club, season and competition
Club	Season	League			National Cup		Total	
Club	Season	Division	Apps	Goals	Apps	Goals	Apps	Goals
La Roda	2016-17	Segunda División B	3	0	—	—	3	0
Vilafranca	2017-18	Tercera División	12	0	2	0	14	0
Getafe B	2018-19	Tercera División	22	0	—	—	22	0
KTP	2021	Veikkausliiga	6	1	1	0	7	1
Total			43	1	3	0	46	1
