= Odiáxere =

- Civil parish
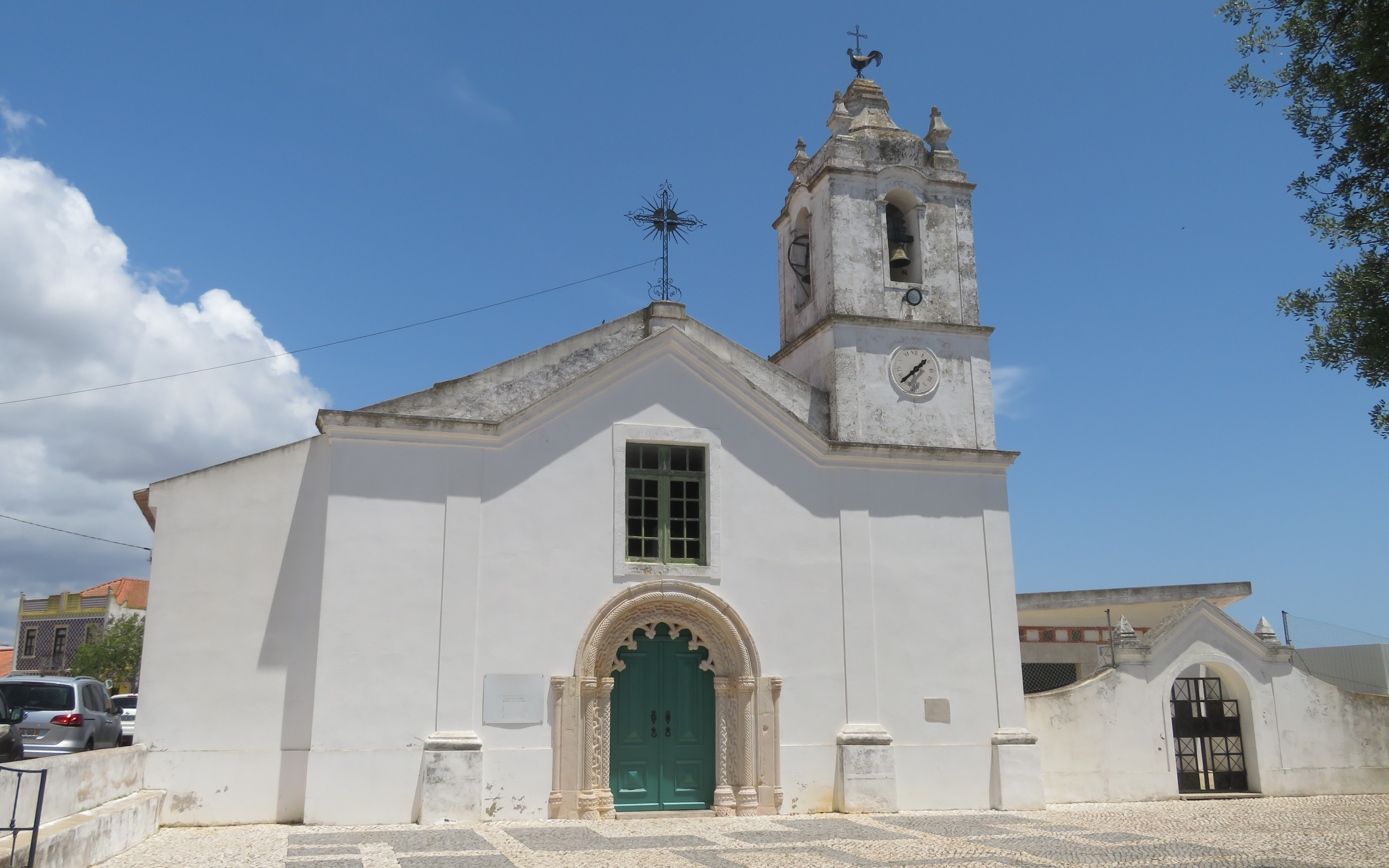
- Odiáxere, parish church

- Location in Portugal
- Coordinates: 37°08′56″N 8°39′35″W
- Country: Portugal
- Region: Algarve
- Intermunic. comm.: Algarve
- District: Faro
- Municipality: Lagos

Area
  - Total: 31.85 km^{2} (12.30 sq mi)

Population (2011)
  - Total: 3,046
  - Density: 95.64/km^{2} (247.7/sq mi)
- Time zone: UTC+00:00 (WET)
  - Summer (DST): UTC+01:00 (WEST)

Odiáxere (European Portuguese pronunciation: [ɔðiˈaʃɨɾɨ]) is a town and civil parish in the municipality of Lagos, Portugal. The population in 2021 was 3,046, up from 2,984 in 2011, in an area of 31.85 km^{2}.

== History ==
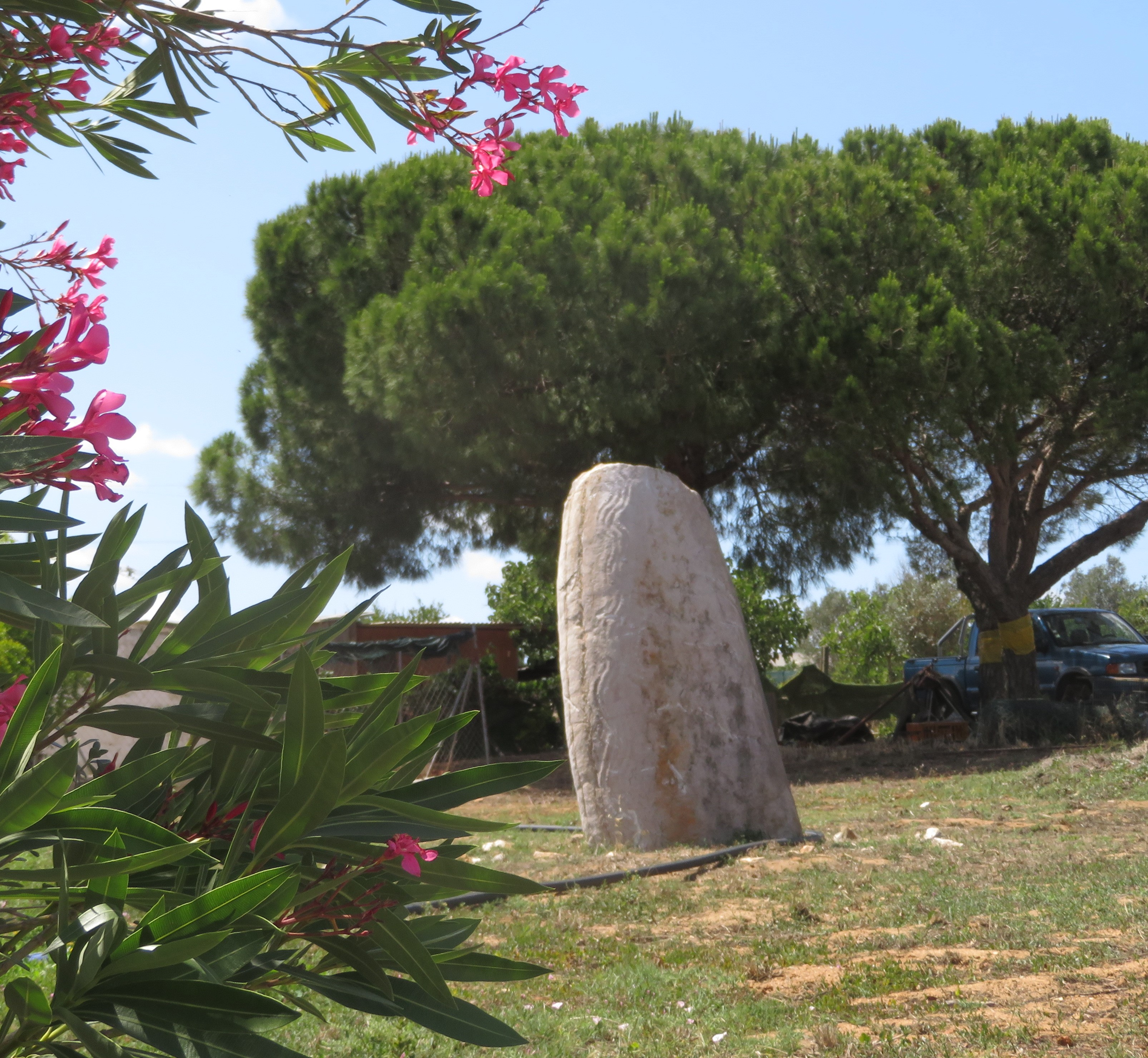
Menir de Odiáxere

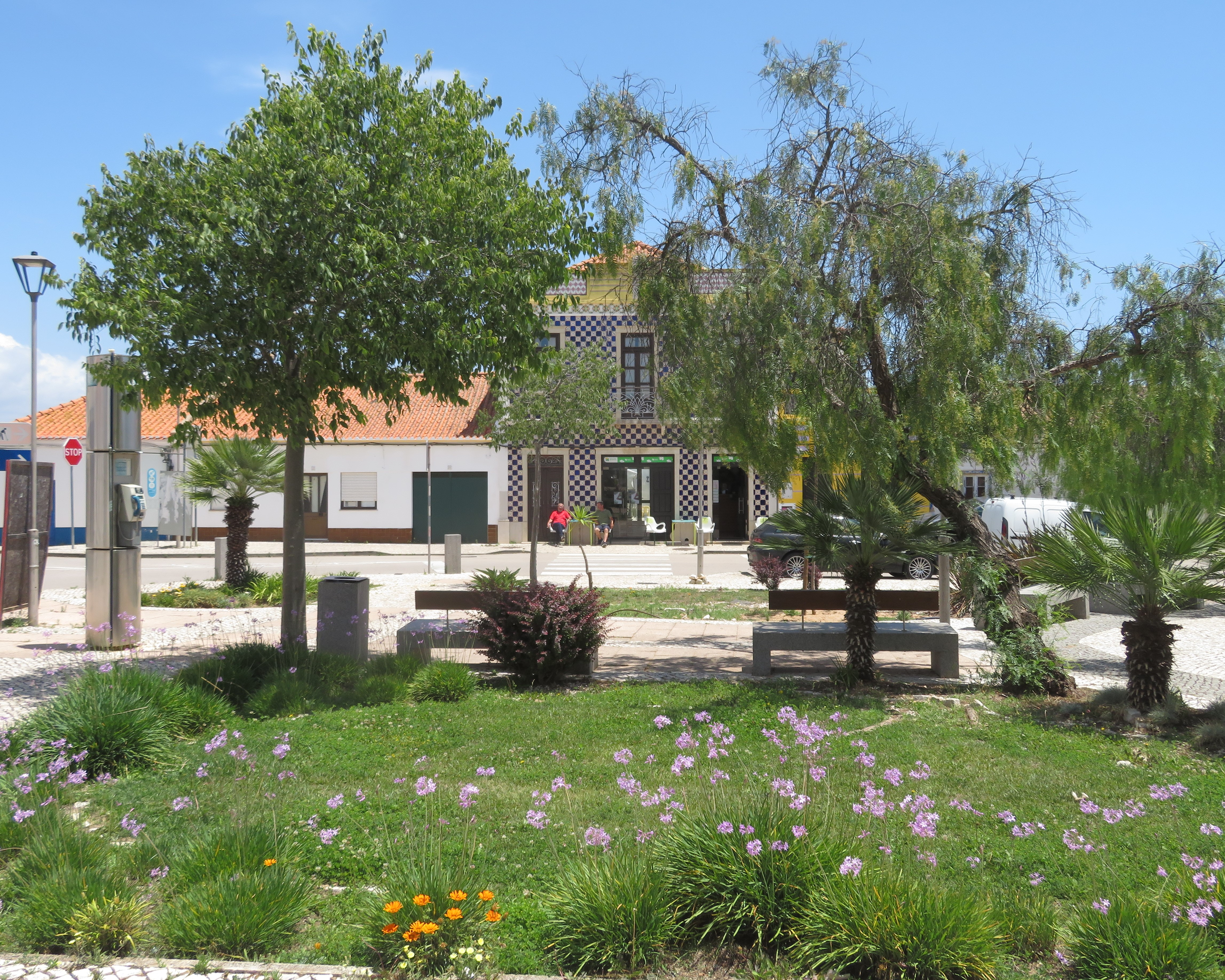
Main Square Largo da Liberdade

Odiáxere, which is famous for its menhir (Menir de Odiáxere) measuring about 7 ft. in height in the garden of Quinta Menir, was the site of a prehistoric settlement going back to the Chalcolithic period. The current version of Odiáxere probably dates back to the Moorish period, on which today's town center was built after the Reconquista. The place name, derived from the Arabic Odi (for river) is a further indication of its Arabic origin.

In the 16th century, Odiáxere became an independent municipality. On 1 July 2003, it was granted the status of a small town (Vila).

== Transport ==
Odiáxere was connected to the Portuguese railway network via a halting place of Linha do Algarve railway line, which was located outside the core of the town and closed down in 2003. Odiáxere is a street settlement directly on the narrow town through-road of EN125, via which the town is connected to junction 2 (Odiáxere) of the A22 motorway. Local public transport is operated here by the municipal bus company ONDA of the city of Lagos. Two local bus lines, Lines 3 (Rosa) and 8 (Lilas), serve the town of Odiáxere. Various long-distance busses, e.g. to Lisbon, Albufeira and Faro stop in Odiáxere as well.
