= Amine Oudrhiri =

French footballer (born 1992)

Personal information
- Full name: Amine Mehdi Oudrhiri Idrissi
- Date of birth: 4 November 1992 (age 34)
- Place of birth: Ermont, France
- Height: 1.84 m (6 ft 0 in)
- Position: Midfielder

Team information
- Current team: Torreense
- Number: 6

Youth career
- 2011–2012: Racing Club de France

Senior career*
Years	Team	Apps	(Gls)
2012–2013	Red Star	44	(2)
2013–2016	Nantes	0	(0)
2015	→ Arles-Avignon (loan)	2	(0)
2015–2016	→ Sedan (loan)	27	(0)
2017	Lusitano VRSA	8	(0)
2017–2020	Leixões	83	(1)
2020–2021	Farense	46	(0)
2022–2025	Rio Ave	72	(1)
2025	Estrela da Amadora	11	(0)
2025–2026	MAS Fez	26	(0)
2026–	Torreense	4	(0)
- * Club domestic league appearances and goals as of 11 September 2026

Amine Mehdi Oudrhiri Idrissi (born 4 November 1992) is a French professional footballer who plays as a midfielder for Liga Portugal 2 club Torreense.

== Personal life ==
Oudrhiri was born in Ermont, in the northwestern suburbs of Paris. He holds French and Moroccan nationalities.

== Career ==
After spending time in the semi-professional leagues, Oudrhiri joined Nantes in 2013. He was loaned out for half a season to Arles-Avignon in February 2015 where he made his full professional debut the same month, in a 1–0 Ligue 2 defeat against Nîmes. On 28 August 2015, he again went on loan, this time for a whole season, to Sedan.
