= Braian Mansilla =

Argentine footballer

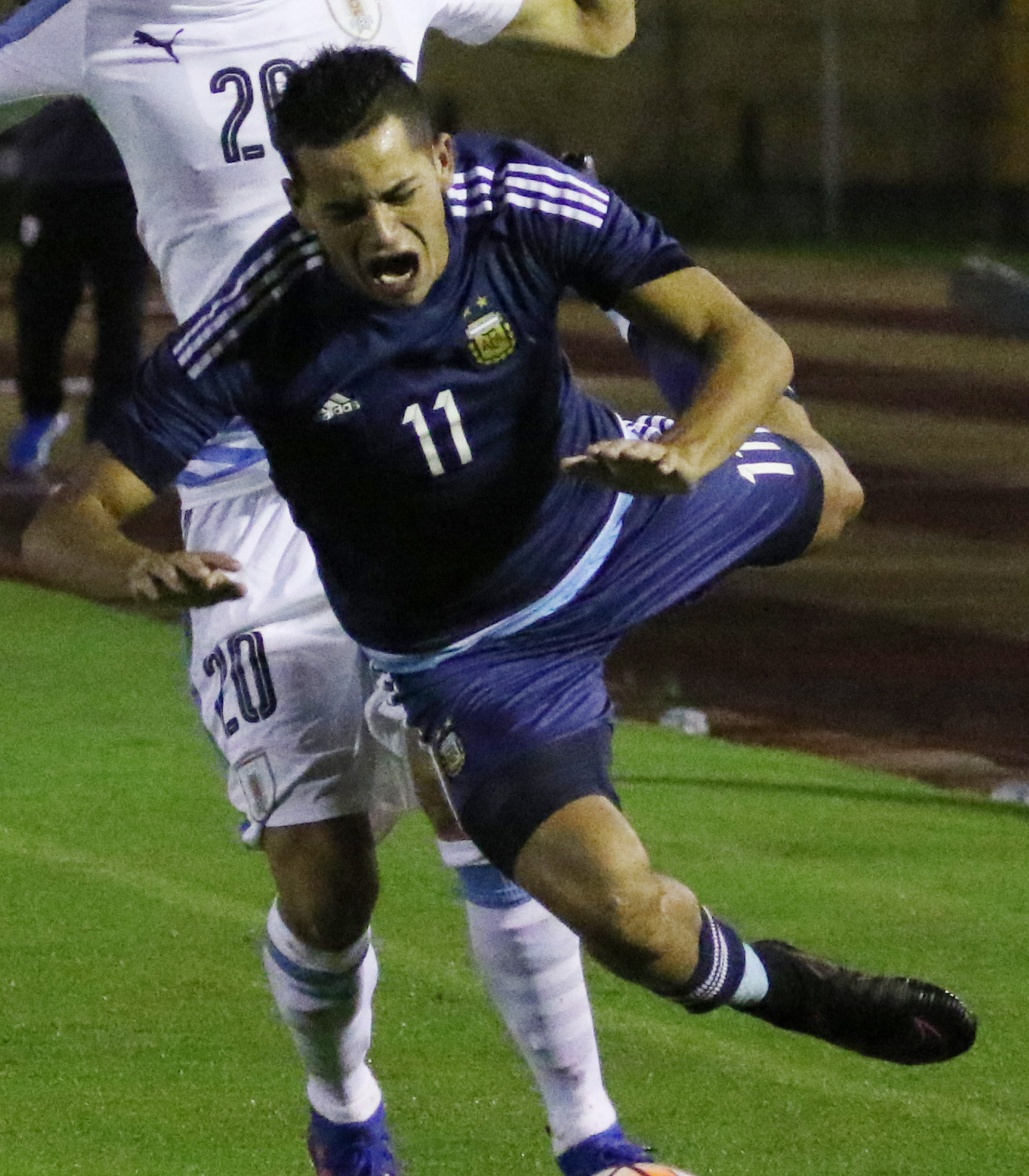
- Mansilla in 2017

Personal information
- Full name: Braian Ezequiel Mansilla
- Date of birth: 16 April 1997 (age 29)
- Place of birth: Rosario, Argentina
- Height: 1.78 m (5 ft 10 in)
- Positions: Forward; winger

Team information
- Current team: Rodina Moscow (on loan from Akhmat Grozny)
- Number: 11

Youth career
- –2015: Racing Club

Senior career*
Years	Team	Apps	(Gls)
2015–2023	Racing Club	29	(1)
2016	→ Quilmes (loan)	14	(3)
2019	→ Gimnasia LP (loan)	4	(0)
2019–2020	→ Vitória Setúbal (loan)	29	(0)
2020–2021	→ Farense (loan)	26	(1)
2021–2022	→ Platense (loan)	25	(4)
2022–2023	→ Orenburg (loan)	22	(4)
2023–2025	Orenburg	54	(8)
2025–	Akhmat Grozny	22	(3)
2026–	→ Rodina Moscow (loan)	7	(0)

International career
2017	Argentina U20	12	(2)
- * Club domestic league appearances and goals as of 7 November 2026

Braian Ezequiel Mansilla (born 16 April 1997) is an Argentine professional footballer who plays as a central forward or winger for Russian club Rodina Moscow on loan from Akhmat Grozny.

== Club career ==
Mansilla came up through the youth ranks of Racing Club. He made his league debut on 19 October 2015 against Boca Juniors. On 25 January 1016, he was loaned out to Quilmes.

On 22 January 2019, Mansilla joined Gimnasia LP on a one-year loan. On 4 August 2019, Mansilla left for Primeira Liga club Vitória Setúbal, join them on loan. In the summer of 2020, he joined fellow Portuguese club Farense on loan, with an option to join permanently. On 28 June 2021, he joined Platense on loan.

On 5 July 2022, Mansilla moved to Russian Premier League club Orenburg on loan with an option to buy. On 16 May 2023, he agreed on a permanent move to Orenburg and signed a 3-year contract with the club. He was chosen as league's Player of the Month for September 2023.

On 22 June 2025, Mansilla signed a three-year contract with Akhmat Grozny. On 8 August 2026, he was loaned by Rodina Moscow for the 2026–27 season, with an option to buy.

== Career statistics ==
As of match played 7 November 2026

Appearances and goals by club, season and competition
Club	Season	League			Cup		Continental		Other		Total	
Club	Season	Division	Apps	Goals	Apps	Goals	Apps	Goals	Apps	Goals	Apps	Goals
Racing Club	2015	Argentine Primera División	1	0	1	0	0	0	—		2	0
Racing Club	2016	Argentine Primera División	—		0	0	—		—		0	0
Racing Club	2016–17	Argentine Primera División	13	0	—		2 (Note: Appearances in Copa Sudamericana)	1	—		15	1
Racing Club	2017–18	Argentine Primera División	11	1	2	0	7 (Note: Four appearances, one goal in Copa Sudamericana, three appearances in Copa Libertadores)	1	2 (Note: Appearances in Torneos de Verano)	0	22	2
Racing Club	2018–19	Argentine Primera División	4	0	—		0	0	—		4	0
Racing Club	Total		29	1	3	0	9	2	2	0	43	3
Quilmes	2016	Argentine Primera División	14	3	—		—		—		14	3
Gimnasia LP	2018–19	Argentine Primera División	4	0	—		—		4 (Note: Appearances in Copa de la Superliga)	0	8	0
Gimnasia LP	2019–20	Argentine Primera División	0	0	1	0	—		—		1	0
Gimnasia LP	Total		4	0	1	0	0	0	4	0	9	0
Vitória Setúbal	2019–20	Primeira Liga	29	0	1	0	—		3 (Note: Appearances in Taça da Liga)	0	33	0
Farense	2020–21	Primeira Liga	26	1	1	0	—		—		27	1
Platense	2021	Argentine Primera División	24	4	—		—		—		24	4
Platense	2022	Argentine Primera División	1	0	1	0	—		9 (Note: Appearances in Copa de la Liga Profesional)	3	11	3
Platense	Total		25	4	1	0	0	0	9	3	35	7
Orenburg (loan)	2022–23	Russian Premier League	22	4	3	1	—		—		25	5
Orenburg	2023–24	Russian Premier League	27	3	3	0	—		—		30	3
Orenburg	2024–25	Russian Premier League	27	5	2	0	—		—		29	5
Orenburg	Total		54	8	5	0	—		—		59	8
Akhmat Grozny	2025–26	Russian Premier League	22	3	4	0	—		—		26	3
Rodina Moscow (loan)	2026–27	Russian Premier League	7	0	0	0	—		—		7	0
Career total			232	24	19	1	9	2	18	3	278	30

== Honours ==
Racing Club

- AFA Liga Profesional de Fútbol: 2018–19

Individual

- Russian Premier League player of the month: September 2023.
