= Alex Pinto =

Portuguese footballer

Personal information
- Full name: Carlos Alexandre Reis Pinto
- Date of birth: 8 July 1998 (age 28)
- Place of birth: Guimarães, Portugal
- Height: 1.87 m (6 ft 2 in)
- Position: Right-back

Team information
- Current team: Farense
- Number: 78

Youth career
- 2007–2011: Vitória Guimarães
- 2011: Os Sandinenses
- 2012–2013: Moreirense
- 2013–2017: Vitória Guimarães

Senior career*
Years	Team	Apps	(Gls)
2017	Vitória Guimarães B	4	(0)
2017	Vitória Guimarães	1	(0)
2017–2020	Benfica B	59	(0)
2019–2020	→ Gil Vicente (loan)	16	(0)
2020-2021	Farense	23	(0)
2022–2024	DAC Dunajská Streda	50	(0)
2024	Gil Vicente	14	(0)
2024–2026	Arouca	21	(0)
2026–	Farense	12	(0)

International career
2017	Portugal U19	2	(0)
2017–2018	Portugal U20	7	(0)
- * Club domestic league appearances and goals as of 20 May 2026

Carlos Alexandre "Alex" Reis Pinto (born 8 July 1998) is a Portuguese professional footballer who plays as a right-back for Liga Portugal 2 club Farense.

== Club career ==
Born in Guimarães, Pinto made his professional debut in a Segunda Liga match for Vitória Guimarães B against Freamunde on 30 January 2017. He debuted in Primeira Liga as a substitute in Vitória de Guimarães' last league match of the season, on 20 May, against Feirense. On 5 June, he signed a six-season contract with S.L. Benfica.

In January 2024, Pinto returned to Primeira Liga Gil Vicente having previously spent time with the club on loan, returning to Portugal following a spell in Slovakia with DAC Dunajská Streda.

On 2 July 2024, Pinto moved to fellow Primeira Liga side Arouca, signing a two-year contract. On 7 January 2026, following 24 appearances for the club, his contract was terminated by mutual agreement.

On 27 January 2026, Pinto returned to Farense, competing in Liga Portugal 2, signing a six-month contract.
