= Socovos =

Coordinates: 38°20′N 1°58′W

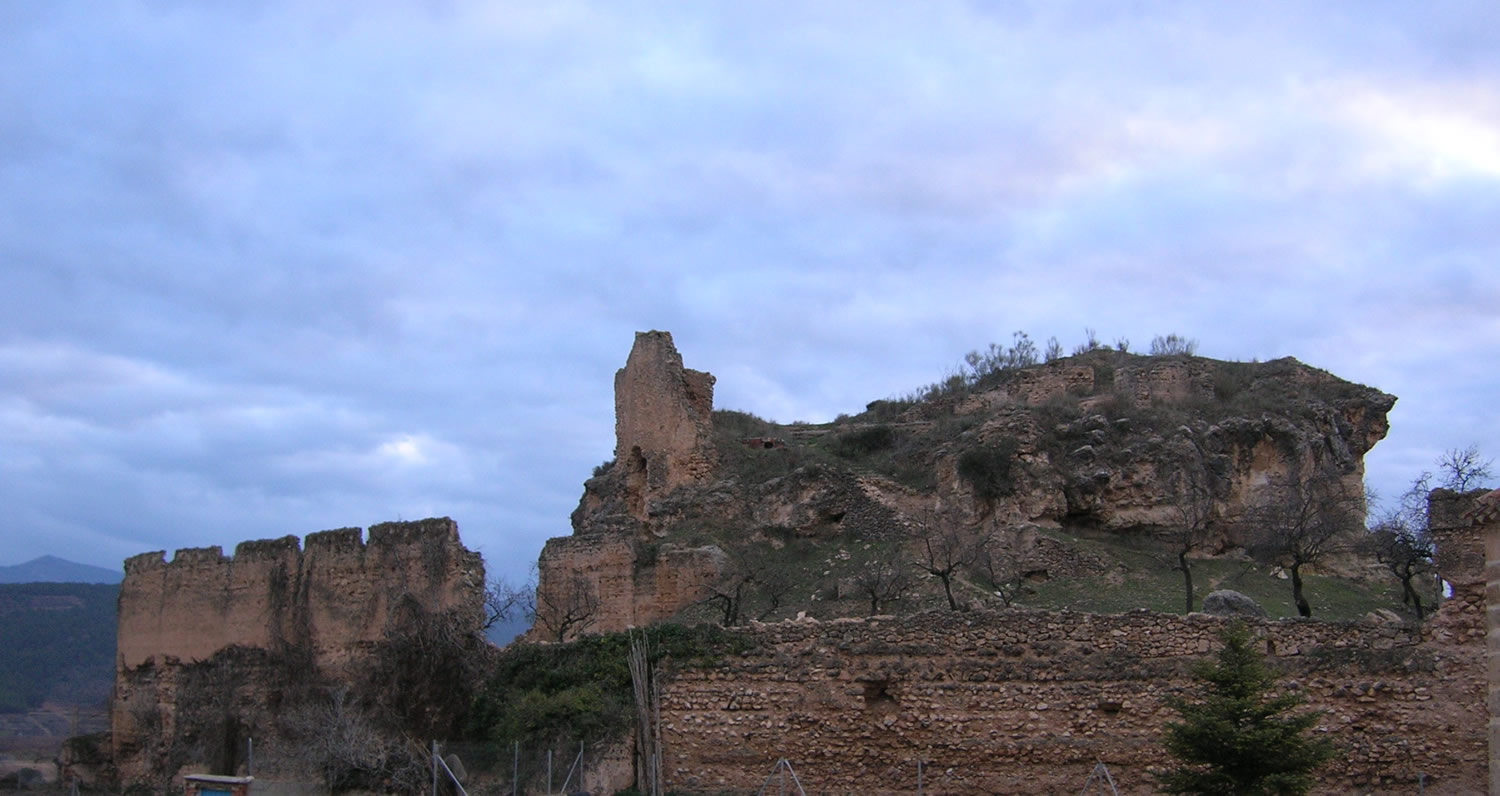
Remains of the Castle of Socovos

Coat of arms of Socovos

Socovos is a municipality in Albacete, Castile-La Mancha, Spain. It has a population of 1,705 as of 2023.
