= Widzew Łódź Stadium =

Football stadium in Łódź, Poland

Coordinates: 51°45′54″N 19°30′42″E

- Stadion Widzewa
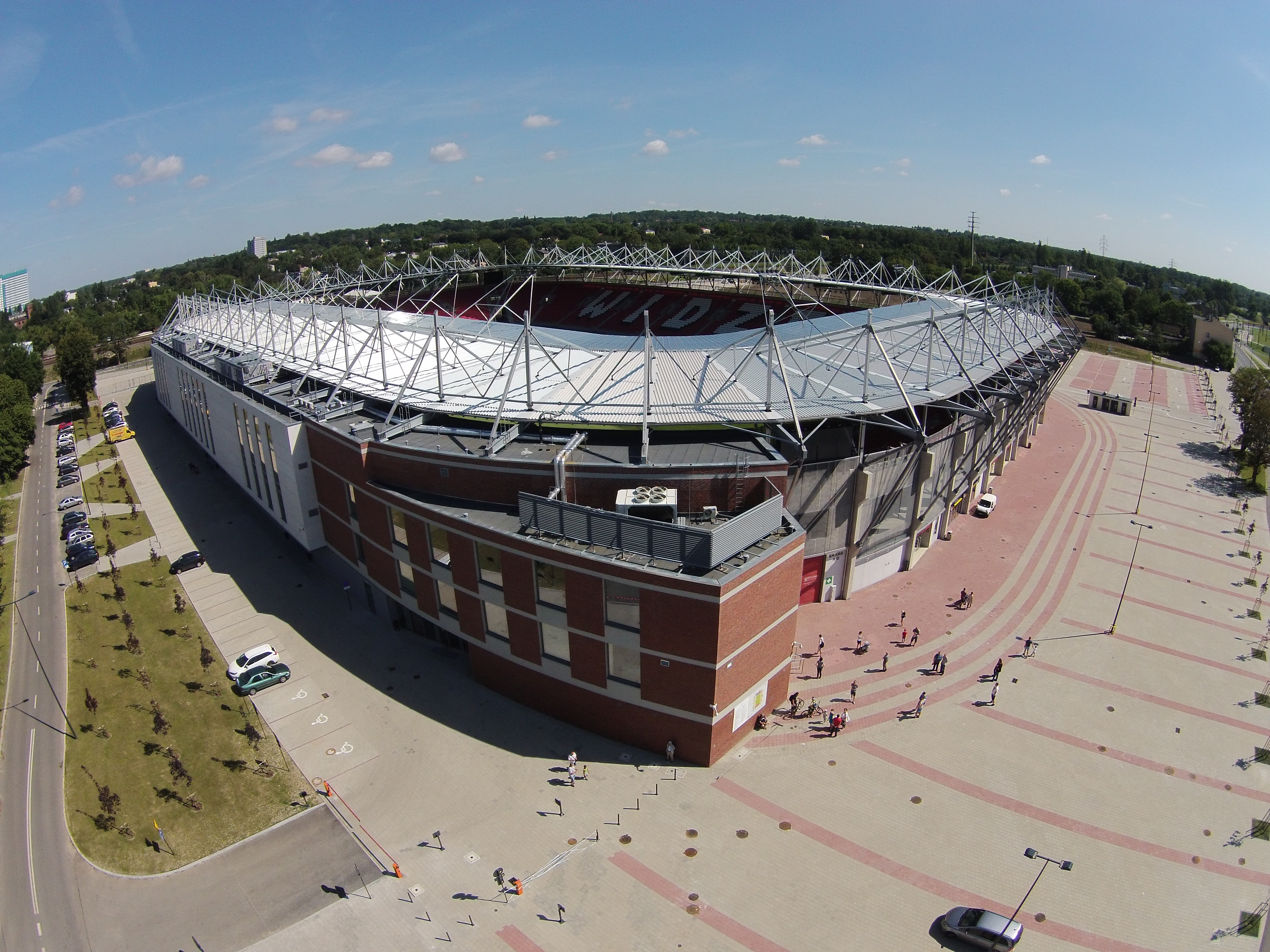
- Interactive map of Widzew Łódź Stadium
- Location: Łódź, Poland
- Owner: Łódź City Council
- Capacity: 18,018
- Surface: Grass
- Field size: 106 m × 70 m (348 ft × 230 ft)

Construction
- Opened: 30 May 1930; 2017
- Renovated: 2015–2017
- Closed: November 2014
- Demolished: Early 2015
- Cost: 138M PLN (2014)

Tenants
- Widzew Łódź; Budowlani Łódź (some games); Poland national rugby union team (some games): Major sporting events hosted; 2019 FIFA U-20 World Cup

The Widzew Łódź Stadium (Polish: Stadion Widzewa Łódź) is a football stadium in Łódź, Poland. It is the home venue of Widzew Łódź. The stadium has an all-seater capacity of 18,018. The previous stadium had a capacity of 10,500 seats, with only part of the West Stand covered. It was demolished in early 2015 to make way for the new stadium.

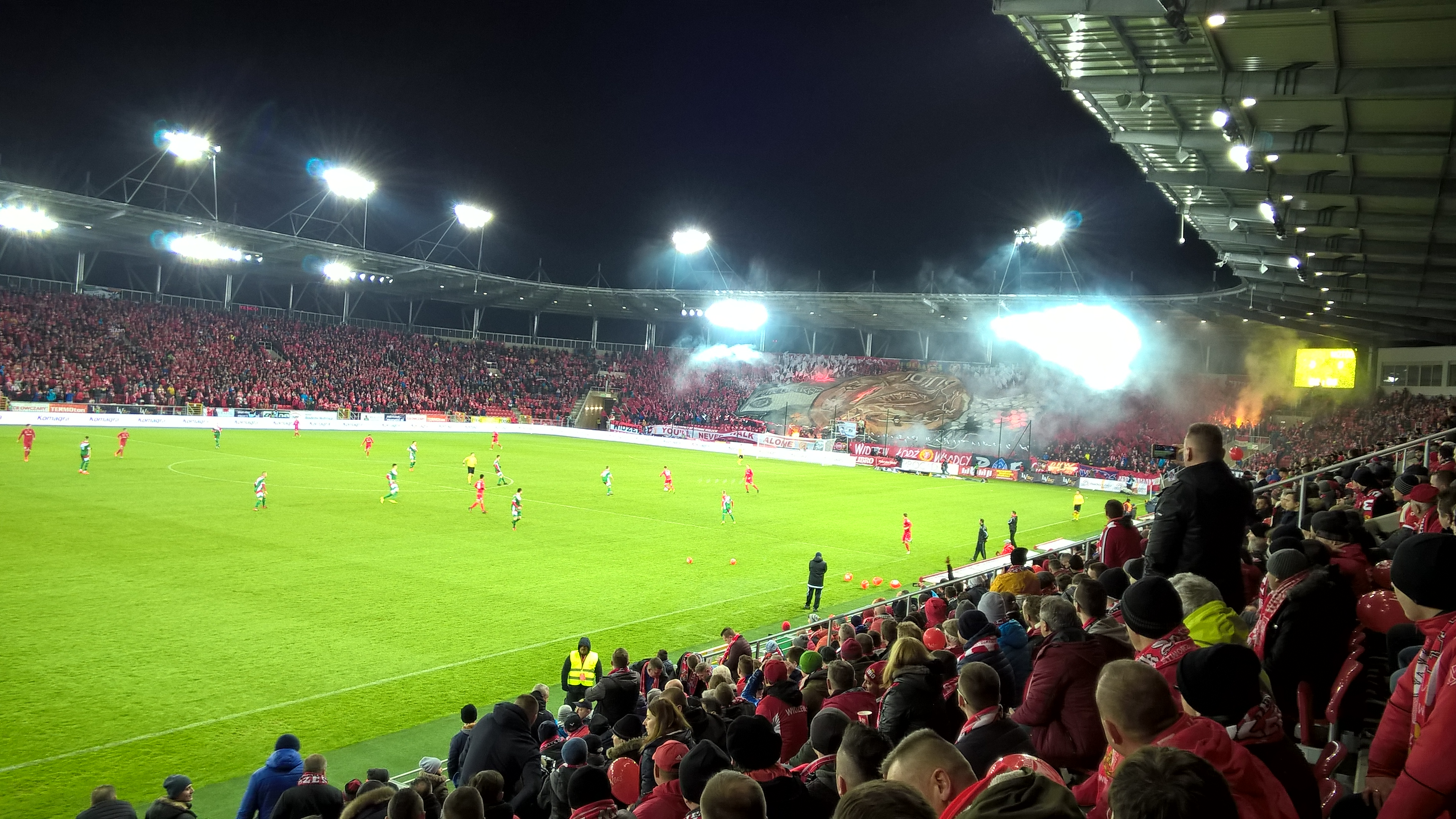
The new stadium of Widzew Łódź.

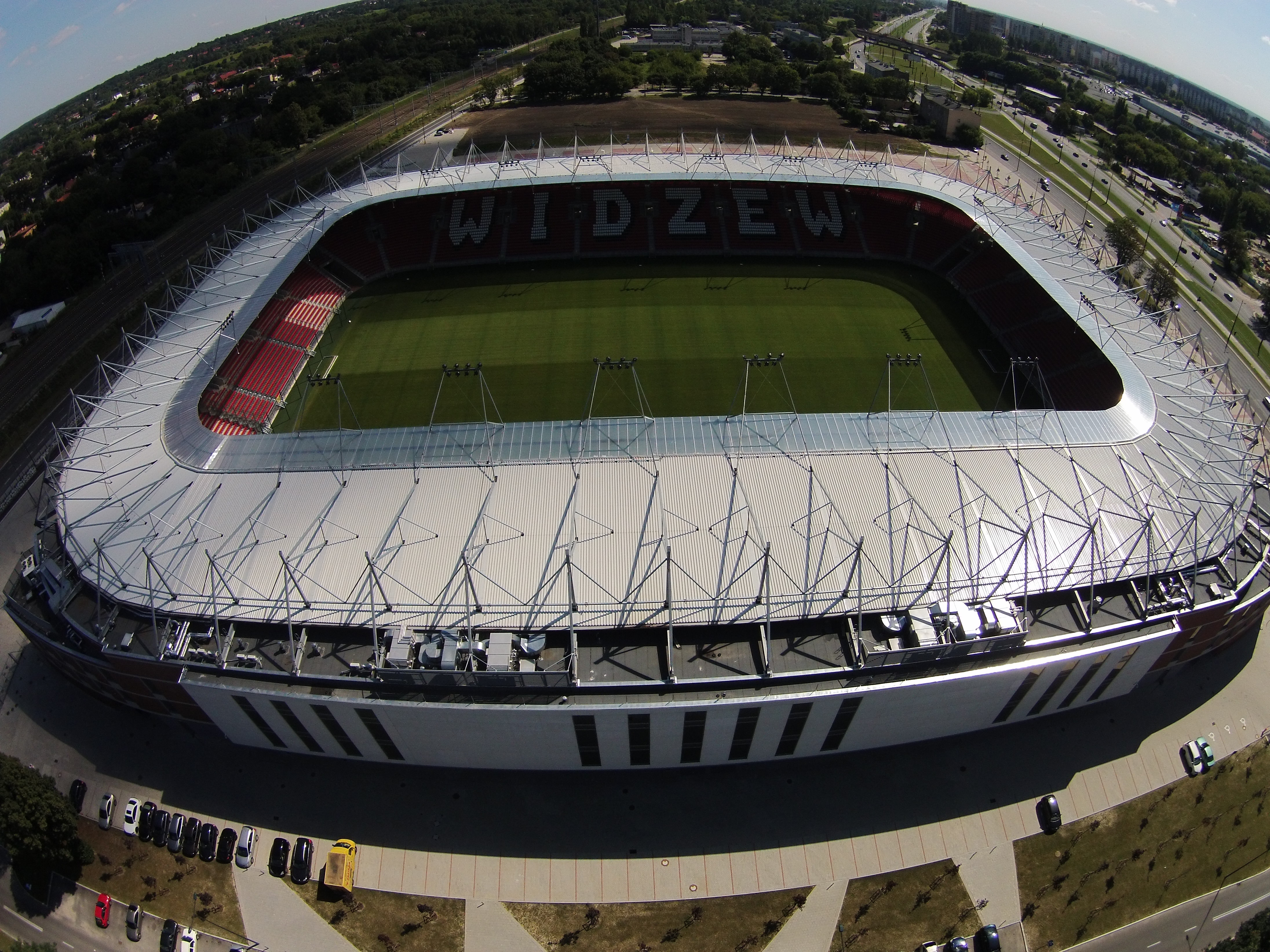
An aerial view of the reconstructed stadium in 2017.

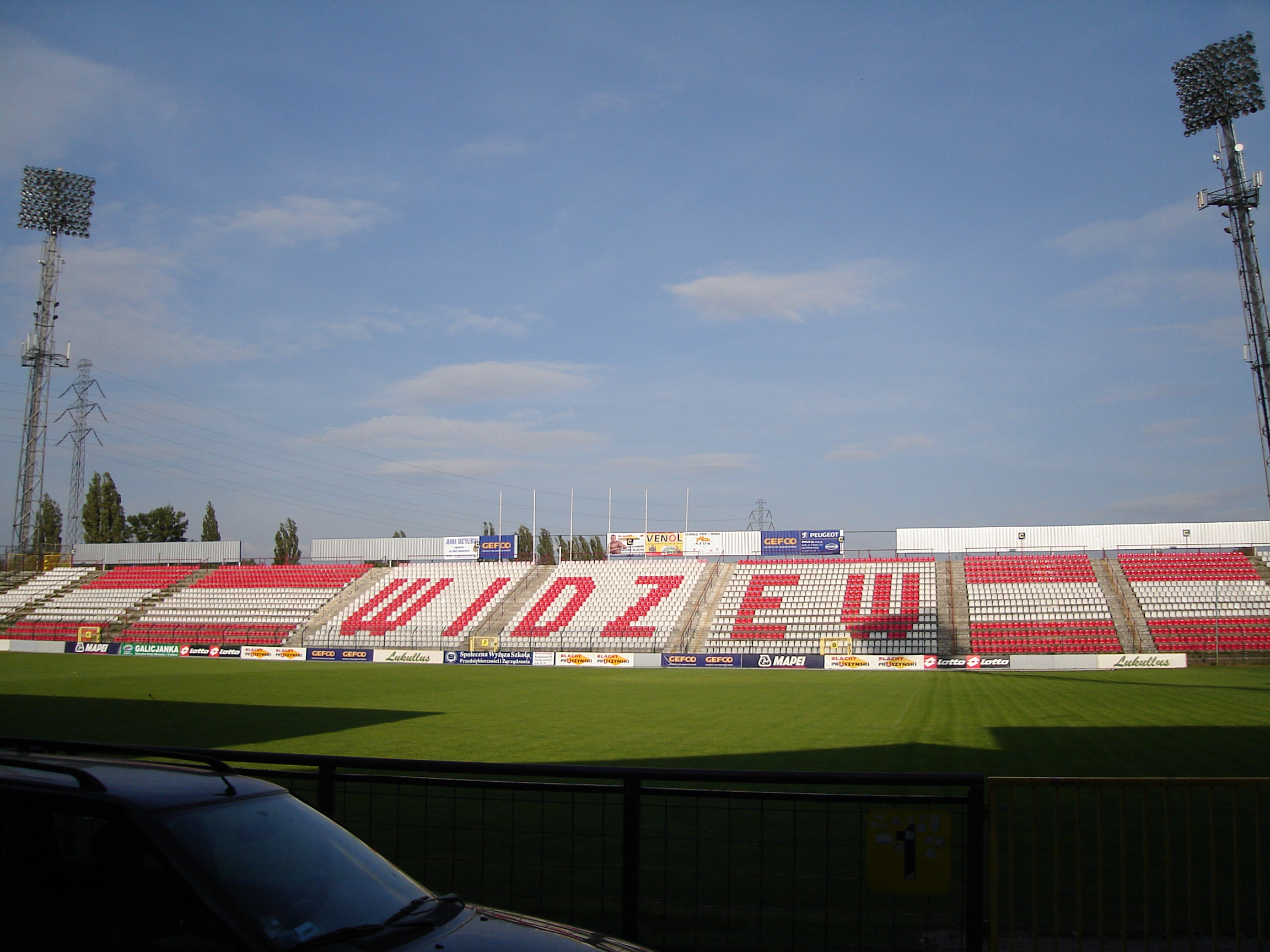
The old ground.

== The 2015 redevelopment ==
After many proposals over the years and speculation about a replacement for Widzew Stadium (including for UEFA Euro 2012), a definitive redevelopment was started in 2014. Until the stadium was completed, Widzew played their home games at Piotrków Trybunalski.

In October 2014, plans for a new 18,018 seater stadium were announced. Originally intended to be completed by November 2016, the main contractor for the construction was Mosty Łódź. Unlike previous proposals, all seats are covered. The exterior is clad in red-brick and transparent back-lit panels. The West Grandstand continues to be the main stand. It contains the changing rooms, a gym, 24 corporate boxes, 8 commentary boxes, 2 TV studios etc. The other 3 stands have simpler facilities, and include space for 900-1200 visiting supporters. The pitch was moved 20m to the east to accommodate the larger West Stand, encroaching on the current training pitch.

Local roads and tram-lines were also upgraded.

The stadium was also designed to accommodate Rugby, including local club Budowlani Łódź, and concerts. The North stand was designed to incorporate a stage.

This stadium hosted the opening and final of the 2019 FIFA U-20 World Cup, as a part of the six host cities.

== Sources ==
- (in Polish) Stadion Widzewa Łódź
- Lodzpost.com: Home is where the heart is - last game at the old stadium

== See also ==
- Władysław Król Municipal Stadium

| Preceded by Suwon World Cup Stadium; Suwon | FIFA U-20 World Cup; Final Venue; 2019 | Succeeded by Estadio Único Diego Armando Maradona; La Plata |
