= Dawid Tkacz =

Polish footballer (born 2005)

Personal information
- Full name: Dawid Tkacz
- Date of birth: 25 January 2005 (age 21)
- Place of birth: Łęczna, Poland
- Height: 1.81 m (5 ft 11 in)
- Position: Midfielder

Team information
- Current team: Górnik Łęczna
- Number: 11

Youth career
- 2015–2021: Górnik Łęczna

Senior career*
Years	Team	Apps	(Gls)
2021–2023	Górnik Łęczna	32	(5)
2023–2025	Widzew Łódź	20	(0)
2024–2025	→ Stal Mielec (loan)	18	(0)
2025–	Górnik Łęczna	29	(3)

International career
2022	Poland U17	8	(2)
2022	Poland U18	2	(0)
2023	Poland U19	2	(0)
- * Club domestic league appearances and goals as of 16:13, 26 May 2026 (UTC)

Dawid Tkacz (born 25 January 2005) is a Polish professional footballer who plays as a midfielder for II liga club Górnik Łęczna.

== Career statistics ==
As of match played 24 May 2026

Appearances and goals by club, season and competition
Club	Season	League			Polish Cup		Europe		Other		Total	
Club	Season	Division	Apps	Goals	Apps	Goals	Apps	Goals	Apps	Goals	Apps	Goals
Górnik Łęczna	2021–22	Ekstraklasa	2	0	1	0	—		—		3	0
Górnik Łęczna	2022–23	I liga	30	5	5	0	—		—		35	5
Górnik Łęczna	Total		32	5	6	0	—		—		38	5
Widzew Łódź	2023–24	Ekstraklasa	20	0	3	0	—		—		23	0
Stal Mielec (loan)	2024–25	Ekstraklasa	18	0	1	0	—		—		19	0
Górnik Łęczna	2025–26	I liga	29	3	1	0	—		—		30	3
Career total			99	8	11	0	0	0	0	0	110	8
