= Fran Álvarez (footballer, born 1998) =

Spanish footballer (born 1998)

Personal information
- Full name: Francisco Javier Álvarez Rodríguez
- Date of birth: 21 January 1998 (age 28)
- Place of birth: Benidorm, Spain
- Height: 1.78 m (5 ft 10 in)
- Position: Midfielder

Team information
- Current team: Widzew Łódź
- Number: 10

Youth career
- Villarreal

Senior career*
Years	Team	Apps	(Gls)
2017–2018	Villarreal C	31	(4)
2017–2020	Villarreal B	33	(2)
2020–2021	Valladolid B	29	(6)
2021–2023	Albacete	60	(4)
2023–	Widzew Łódź	96	(22)
- * Club domestic league appearances and goals as of 23:28, 23 August 2026 (UTC)

Francisco Javier "Fran" Álvarez Rodríguez (born 21 January 1998) is a Spanish professional footballer who plays as a midfielder for Polish club Widzew Łódź.

== Career ==
=== Villarreal ===
Born in Socovos, Albacete, Castilla-La Mancha, Álvarez was a Villarreal CF youth graduate. He made his senior debut with the reserves on 19 August 2017, coming on as a second-half substitute for Dani Raba in a 1–0 Segunda División B away win over CD Atlético Baleares, but spent the vast majority of the campaign playing for the C-team in Tercera División.

=== Valladolid ===
On 16 January 2020, Álvarez moved to another reserve team, Real Valladolid Promesas, which was also in the third division.

=== Albacete ===
On 7 July 2021, Álvarez signed a one-year deal with Albacete Balompié, freshly relegated to Primera División RFEF. On 21 June 2022, after being regularly used as Alba achieved promotion to the second division, he signed a new one-year contract with the club.

Álvarez made his professional debut on 9 October 2022, replacing goalscorer Manu Fuster in a 1–1 home draw against CD Tenerife. He scored his first professional goal the following 7 May, netting the opener in a 5–0 away routing of UD Ibiza.

=== Widzew Łódź ===
On 26 June 2023, Álvarez moved abroad for the first time in his career and signed a two-year contract with Polish Ekstraklasa side Widzew Łódź, where he was assigned squad number #10. He debuted in his new club on 23 July 2023 in a 3–2 home victory over Puszcza Niepołomice. He also scored his first goal for Widzew in the 35th minute of that match. During that season, he played 31 times (of which 28 Ekstraklasa matches were played and three in the Polish Cup).

On 1 September 2024, Álvarez was given two yellow cards and, as a consequence, he received a red card and was sent off the pitch. In July 2025, he extended his contract with the club until 2028.
