= Paweł Zieliński =

Polish footballer

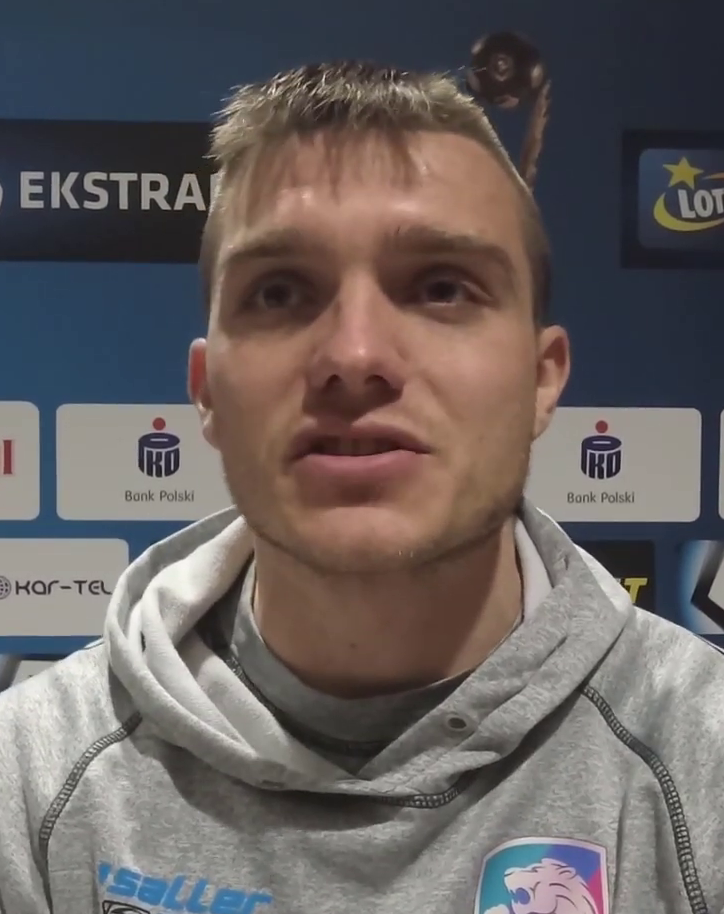
- Zieliński in 2019

Personal information
- Date of birth: 17 July 1990 (age 36)
- Place of birth: Ząbkowice Śląskie, Poland
- Height: 1.78 m (5 ft 10 in)
- Position: Right-back

Team information
- Current team: Ślęza Wrocław

Youth career
- Orzeł Ząbkowice Śląskie
- 2004–2006: UKP Zielona Góra
- 2007–2008: Zagłębie Lubin

Senior career*
Years	Team	Apps	(Gls)
2008–2010	Orzeł Ząbkowice Śląskie	52	(5)
2010–2013	Bielawianka Bielawa	56	(17)
2013–2014	Ślęza Wrocław	15	(3)
2014–2017	Śląsk Wrocław	82	(1)
2017–2021	Miedź Legnica	118	(9)
2021–2024	Widzew Łódź	66	(1)
2024–2026	Orzeł Ząbkowice Śląskie	53	(3)
2026–	Ślęza Wrocław	0	(0)
- * Club domestic league appearances and goals as of 11:53, 31 July 2026 (UTC)

Paweł Zieliński (born 17 July 1990) is a Polish professional footballer who plays as a right-back for III liga club Ślęza Wrocław.

== Career ==
After four seasons at Miedź Legnica, Zieliński moved to Widzew Łódź on 30 June 2021, signing a two-year deal.

In August 2024, he returned to his childhood club Orzeł Ząbkowice Śląskie, playing in the fifth division.

On 27 July 2026, Zieliński returned to Ślęza Wrocław, now playing in the fourth tier.

== Personal life ==
He is the older brother of midfielder Piotr Zieliński.

== Honours ==
Miedź Legnica

- I liga: 2017–18
