= Jordi Sánchez (footballer) =

Spanish footballer (born 1994)

Personal information
- Full name: Jordi Sánchez i Ribas
- Date of birth: 11 November 1994 (age 32)
- Place of birth: Barcelona, Spain
- Height: 1.90 m (6 ft 3 in)
- Position: Forward

Team information
- Current team: Pogoń Szczecin
- Number: 22

Youth career
- Horta
- 2011–2012: Damm
- 2012–2013: Badalona

Senior career*
Years	Team	Apps	(Gls)
2013–2014	Badalona	6	(1)
2014	→ Masnou (loan)	18	(4)
2014–2015	Masnou	8	(4)
2015	Vilassar Mar	17	(6)
2015–2016	Prat	35	(12)
2016–2018	Valencia B	66	(16)
2018–2020	Numancia	7	(1)
2019	→ Ibiza (loan)	12	(2)
2019–2020	→ Valencia B (loan)	25	(8)
2020–2021	Castellón	17	(0)
2021	→ UCAM Murcia (loan)	14	(4)
2021–2022	Albacete	36	(6)
2022–2024	Widzew Łódź	60	(14)
2024–2026	Hokkaido Consadole Sapporo	16	(1)
2026	Wisła Kraków	18	(8)
2026–	Pogoń Szczecin	8	(4)
- * Club domestic league appearances and goals as of 18:39, 22 November 2026 (UTC)

Jordi Sánchez i Ribas (born 11 November 1994) is a Spanish professional footballer who plays as a forward for Ekstraklasa club Pogoń Szczecin.

== Career ==
Born in Barcelona, Catalonia, Sánchez represented UA Horta, CF Damm and CF Badalona as a youth. He made his first team debut for the latter on 12 May 2013, playing the last 28 minutes in a 1–3 Segunda División B away loss against CD Olímpic de Xàtiva.

Sánchez scored his first senior goal on 6 October 2013, netting the equalizer in a 1–2 home loss against the same opponent. The following 13 January, he was loaned to Tercera División side CD Masnou until June.

In January 2015, Sánchez signed for UE Vilassar de Mar six months after joining Masnou permanently. On 11 June of that year, he joined AE Prat still in the fourth division.

On 5 July 2016, Sánchez moved to Valencia CF, being assigned to the reserves in the third division. On 21 June 2018, he signed a two-year contract with Segunda División side CD Numancia.

Sánchez made his professional debut on 13 September 2018, coming on as a second-half substitute for Borja Viguera in a 1–2 home loss against Sporting de Gijón, for the season's Copa del Rey. He scored his first professional goal on 23 December, netting the equalizer in a 1–1 away draw against AD Alcorcón.

On 31 January 2019, Sánchez was loaned to third division side UD Ibiza until June. On 12 July he returned to Valencia's reserves, now in a temporary deal.

On 27 August 2020, Sánchez agreed to a two-year contract with second division newcomers CD Castellón. The following 29 January, he moved to third tier side UCAM Murcia CF on loan for the remainder of the campaign.

On 21 June 2021, he signed for Albacete of the RFEF First Division. On 11 June 2022, Albacete Balompié would achieve promotion to the Segunda División, after a 1–2 play-off final win against Deportivo de La Coruña at the Riazor Stadium, thanks to Jordi's goal in extra time.

On 2 July 2022, Sánchez signed a two-year contract with Polish Ekstraklasa side Widzew Łódź.

On 13 July 2024, Sánchez joined Japanese J1 League club Hokkaido Consadole Sapporo.

On 14 January 2026, Sánchez moved to Polish second-tier side Wisła Kraków on a deal until June 2026. He scored twice and provided three assists in eleven league games as Wisła secured promotion to the Ekstraklasa. On 7 June 2026, his contract was extended for another year. With Ángel Rodado recovering from injury, Sánchez found himself as Wisła's first-choice striker at the start of the 2026–27 season; he went on to score six goals in six opening games of the season.

On 7 September 2026, fellow Ekstraklasa club Pogoń Szczecin exercised the €250,000 release clause in Sánchez's contract. The following day, he joined Pogoń on a two-year deal with an option for a third year.

== Honours ==
Wisła Kraków

- I liga: 2025–26
