= 2025–26 Raków Częstochowa season =

Football club season

Raków Częstochowa
2025–26 season
- Manager: Marek Papszun
- Stadium: Miejski Stadion Piłkarski Raków
- Ekstraklasa: 6th
- Polish Cup: Finals
- UEFA Conference League: Round of 16
- Top goalscorer: League: Jonatan Braut Brunes (10 goals); All: Jonatan Braut Brunes (17 goals)
Away colours
- All statistics correct as of 1 February 2026.

The 2025–26 season is the 105th season in the history of Raków Częstochowa and the club's seventh consecutive season in the Polish Ekstraklasa. The season also includes participation in the Polish Cup and the UEFA Conference League, following Raków’s second-place finish in the domestic league during the 2024–25 season.

== Squad ==
=== Transfers In ===
| Pos. | Player | Transferred from | Fee | Date | Source |
|---|---|---|---|---|---|
| MF | (Poland) Antoni Burkiewicz | (Poland) Podhale Nowy Targ | Loan return | 30 June 2025 | |
| MF | (Poland) Kacper Nowakowski | (Poland) Miedź Legnica | Loan return | 30 June 2025 | |
| MF | (Poland) Jakub Myszor | (Poland) Ruch Chorzów | Loan return | 30 June 2025 | |
| MF | (Poland) Kacper Masiak | (Poland) GKS Jastrzębie | Loan return | 30 June 2025 | |
| MF | (Poland) Karol Struski | (Cyprus) Aris Limassol FC | €1,000,000 | 1 July 2025 | |
| FW | (Norway) Jonatan Braut Brunes | (Belgium) OH Leuven | Undisclosed | 1 July 2025 | |
| FW | (France) Lamine Diaby-Fadiga | (Poland) Jagiellonia Białystok | Undisclosed | 1 July 2025 | |
| MF | (Poland) Oskar Repka | (Poland) GKS Katowice | Undisclosed | 4 July 2025 | |
| GK | (Poland) Oliwier Zych | (England) Aston Villa | Loan | 14 July 2025 | |
| MF | (Poland) Tomasz Pieńko | (Poland) Zagłębie Lubin | €1,500,000 | 25 July 2025 | |
| MF | (Hungary) Péter Baráth | (Hungary) Ferencváros | Undisclosed | 31 July 2025 | |
| MF | (Croatia) Marko Bulat | (Croatia) Dinamo Zagreb | Undisclosed | 1 August 2025 | |
| MF | (Serbia) Bogdan Mirčetić | (Serbia) Radnički 1923 | Undisclosed | 2 September 2025 | |
| FW | (Bosnia and Herzegovina) Imad Rondić | (Germany) 1. FC Köln | Loan | 2 September 2025 | |

=== Transfers Out ===
| Pos. | Player | Transferred to | Fee | Date | Source |
|---|---|---|---|---|---|
| MF | (Hungary) Péter Baráth | (Hungary) Ferencváros | Loan return | 30 June 2025 | |
| DF | (Croatia) Matej Rodin | (Poland) Lechia Gdańsk | End of contract | 1 July 2025 | |
| MF | (Poland) Ben Lederman | (Israel) Maccabi Tel Aviv | Free | 1 July 2025 | |
| MF | (Poland) Kacper Masiak | (Poland) Stal Rzeszów | Undisclosed | 2 July 2025 | |
| MF | (Poland) Kacper Nowakowski | (Poland) Chrobry Głogów | Loan | 17 July 2025 | |
| MF | (Sweden) Gustav Berggren | (United States) New York Red Bulls | €1,800,000 | 23 July 2025 | |
| MF | (Poland) Tobiasz Mras | (Poland) Wieczysta Kraków | Undisclosed | 11 August 2025 | |
| MF | (Poland) Antoni Burkiewicz | (Poland) Polonia Bytom | Loan | 11 August 2025 | |
| DF | (Serbia) Milan Rundić | (Czech Republic) Slovácko | | 20 August 2025 | |
| MF | (Serbia) Srđan Plavšić | (Czech Republic) Baník Ostrava | Loan | 20 August 2025 | |
| MF | (Poland) Jakub Myszor | (Albania) Teuta Durrës | Undisclosed | 27 August 2025 | |
| FW | (Portugal) Leonardo Rocha | (Poland) Zagłębie Lubin | Loan | 8 September 2025 | |

== Friendlies ==
| 28 June 2025 | Raków Częstochowa | 1–3 | Bruk-Bet Termalica Nieciecza |

| 5 July 2025 | Raków Częstochowa | 4–1 | (Slovakia) Železiarne Podbrezová |

| 8 July 2025 | Raków Częstochowa | 2–1 | (Belgium) Patro Eisden Maasmechelen |

| 8 July 2025 | Raków Częstochowa | 2–0 | (Belgium) Lommel |

| 11 July 2025 | Club Brugge (Belgium) | 1–1 | Raków Częstochowa |

| 12 July 2025 | Anderlecht (Belgium) | 2–2 | Raków Częstochowa |

| 20 July 2025 | Raków Częstochowa | 0–0 | Lechia Tomaszów Mazowiecki |

| 6 September 2025 | Raków Częstochowa | 6–1 | Odra Opole |
| 12:00 | | | | Attendance: 0 |

== Competitions ==
=== Overall record ===
| Competition | First match | Last match | Starting round | Final position | Record | | | | | | | |
| Competition | First match | Last match | Starting round | Final position | Pld | W | D | L | GF | GA | GD | Win % |
|---|---|---|---|---|---|---|---|---|---|---|---|---|
| Ekstraklasa | 19 July 2025 | 23 May 2026 | Matchday 1 | | 28 | 11 | 7 | 10 | 37 | 35 | +2 | 39.29 |
| Polish Cup | 29 October 2025 | 2 May 2026 | Second round | | 4 | 3 | 1 | 0 | 11 | 6 | +5 | 75.00 |
| UEFA Conference League | 24 July 2025 | 19 March 2026 | Second qualifying round | Round of 16 | 14 | 9 | 2 | 3 | 22 | 9 | +13 | 64.29 |
| Total | | | | | 46 | 23 | 10 | 13 | 70 | 50 | +20 | 50.00 |

Last updated: 13 April 2026
Source: Competitions

=== Ekstraklasa ===
| Pos | Team | Pld | W | D | L | GF | GA | GD | Pts | Qualification or relegation |
|---|---|---|---|---|---|---|---|---|---|---|
| 2 | Górnik Zabrze | 34 | 16 | 8 | 10 | 50 | 38 | +12 | 56 (Note: Head-to-head points: Górnik Zabrze 6, Jagiellonia Białystok 0.) | Qualification for the Champions League second qualifying round |
| 3 | Jagiellonia Białystok | 34 | 15 | 11 | 8 | 56 | 41 | +15 | 56 | Qualification for the Europa League third qualifying round (Note: The 2025–26 Polish Cup winners (Górnik Zabrze) qualify for the Europa League third qualifying round. As Górnik Zabrze finished in the top 2, then the berth went to the third place team.) |
| 4 | Raków Częstochowa | 34 | 16 | 7 | 11 | 51 | 40 | +11 | 55 | Qualification for the Conference League second qualifying round |
| 5 | GKS Katowice | 34 | 14 | 8 | 12 | 51 | 45 | +6 | 50 | Qualification for the Conference League second qualifying round |
| 6 | Legia Warsaw | 34 | 12 | 13 | 9 | 42 | 37 | +5 | 49 | |

Source: ekstraklasa.org 90minut.pl
Rules for classification: 1) Points; 2) Head-to-head points; 3) Head-to-head goal difference; 4) Goal difference; 5) Goals scored; 6) Number of wins; 7) Number of away wins; 8) Lower number of points based on yellow and red cards (red card = 3 points, yellow card = 1 point, sending-off = 3 points - including 1 point for first yellow card); 9) Fairplay ranking; 10) Draw.
(Note: Head-to-head record is used only after all the matches between the teams in question have been played)

==== Results summary ====
| Overall | | | | | | | | Home | | | | | | Away | | | | | |
| Pld | W | D | L | GF | GA | GD | Pts | W | D | L | GF | GA | GD | W | D | L | GF | GA | GD |
|---|---|---|---|---|---|---|---|---|---|---|---|---|---|---|---|---|---|---|---|
| 28 | 11 | 7 | 10 | 37 | 35 | +2 | 40 | 5 | 4 | 4 | 14 | 12 | +2 | 6 | 3 | 6 | 23 | 23 | 0 |

Last updated: 13 April 2026.

==== Results by round ====
| Round | 1 | 2 | 3 | 4 | 5 | 6 | 7 | 8 | 9 | 10 | 11 | 12 | 13 | 14 | 15 | 16 | 17 | 18 | 19 | 20 | 21 | 22 | 23 | 24 | 25 | 26 | 27 | 28 | 29 | 30 | 31 | 32 | 33 | 34 |
|---|---|---|---|---|---|---|---|---|---|---|---|---|---|---|---|---|---|---|---|---|---|---|---|---|---|---|---|---|---|---|---|---|---|---|
| Ground | A | H | A | H | A | H | A | H | H | A | H | A | H | A | A | H | A | H | A | H | A | H | A | H | A | A | H | A | H | A | H | H | A | H |
| Result | W | L | L | L | W | D | L | L | D | W | W | L | W | W | W | L | W | W | L | D | D | W | L | W | L | D | D | D | | | | | | |
| Position | 6 | 8 | 10 | 14 | 10 | 12 | 16 | 16 | 16 | 12 | 10 | 12 | 9 | 8 | 6 | 8 | 5 | 4 | 6 | 7 | 7 | 5 | 5 | 4 | 5 | 6 | 5 | 6 | | | | | | |

Updated to match(es) played on 13 April 2026. Source:
A = Away; H = Home; W = Win; D = Draw; L = Loss; P = Postponed

==== Matches ====
| 19 July 2025 1 | GKS Katowice | 0–1 | Raków Częstochowa | Katowice |
| 20:15 | | | Braut Brunes 51' | Stadium: GKS Katowice Stadium |

| 27 July 2025 2 | Raków Częstochowa | 1–2 | Wisła Płock | Częstochowa |
| 14:45 | | | | Stadium: Miejski Stadion Piłkarski Raków |

| 3 August 2025 3 | Radomiak Radom | 3–1 | Raków Częstochowa | Radom |
| 17:30 | | | | Stadium: Stadion im. Braci Czachorów |

| 17 August 2025 5 | Bruk-Bet Termalica Nieciecza | 2–3 | Raków Częstochowa | Nieciecza |
| 20:15 | | | | Stadium: Stadion Sportowy Bruk-Bet Termalica |

| 31 August 2025 7 | Pogoń Szczecin | 2–0 | Raków Częstochowa | Szczecin |
| 20:15 | | | | Stadium: Stadion Miejski im. Floriana Krygiera |

| 15 September 2025 8 | Raków Częstochowa | 0–1 | Górnik Zabrze | Częstochowa |
| 19:00 | | | Sow 14' | Stadium: Miejski Stadion Piłkarski Raków; Referee: Bartosz Frankowski |

| 20 September 2025 9 | Raków Częstochowa | 1–1 | Legia Warsaw | Częstochowa |
| 20:15 UTC+2 | | | | Stadium: Miejski Stadion Piłkarski Raków |

| 24 September 2025 6 | Raków Częstochowa | 2-2 | Lech Poznań | Częstochowa |
| 18:45 | Tudor (yellow card) 45+3'; Repka (yellow card) 61'; Baráth 64'; Ivi 67' (pen.); Adriano (yellow card) 90+5' | Report | Pereira 29'; Kozubal (yellow card) 32'; Palma 45+4' (red card) 55' | Stadium: Miejski Stadion Piłkarski Raków; Attendance: 5,326; Referee: (Poland) Szymon Marciniak |

| 28 September 2025 10 | Widzew Łódź | 0-1 | Raków Częstochowa | Łódź |
| 12:15 | Visus (yellow card) 17'; Selahi (yellow card) 31'; Kozlovský (yellow card) 90+5' | Report | Racovițan (yellow card) 22'; Adriano (yellow card) 62'; Tudor (yellow card) 90'; Diaby-Fadiga 90+3' (yellow card) 90+4' | Stadium: Widzew Łódź Stadium; Attendance: 16,984; Referee: (Poland) Łukasz Kuźma |

| 5 October 2025 11 | Raków Częstochowa | 2-0 | Motor Lublin | Częstochowa |
| 14:45 | Brunes 45+1' (pen.) 57'; Svarnas (yellow card) 54'; Tudor (red card) 90+3' | Report | Ede (yellow card) 19'; Rodrigues (yellow card) 26'; Dadaşov (yellow card) 76' | Stadium: Miejski Stadion Piłkarski Raków; Attendance: 5,347; Referee: (Poland) Damian Kos |

| 18 October 2025 12 | Cracovia | 2-0 | Raków Częstochowa | Kraków |
| 20:15 | Maigaard (yellow card) 9'; Minchev 33'; Perković 51'; Klich (yellow card) 51'; Henriksson (yellow card) 90+3' | Report | Adriano (yellow card) 59'; Konstantopoulos (yellow card) 68'; Svarnas (yellow card) 88'; Rondić (yellow card) 89' | Stadium: Józef Piłsudski Cracovia Stadium; Attendance: 12,389; Referee: (Poland) Damian Sylwestrzak |

| 26 October 2025 13 | Raków Częstochowa | 2-1 | Lechia Gdańsk | Częstochowa |
| 14:45 | Struski (yellow card) 24' (yellow-red card) 37'; Diaby-Fadiga 30'; Pieńko 78' | Report | Neugebauer (yellow card) 13'; Pllana (yellow card) 27'; Bobček 33'; Vojtko (yellow card) 40' | Stadium: Miejski Stadion Piłkarski Raków; Attendance: 5,500; Referee: (Poland) Piotr Rzucidło |

| 2 November 2025 14 | Jagiellonia Białystok | 1-2 | Raków Częstochowa | Białystok |
| 17:30 | Pululu 80' (yellow card) 83'; Jóźwiak (yellow card) 81'; Pozo (yellow card) 83'; Flach (yellow card) 90+16'; Vital (yellow card) 90+21' | Report | Repka 31' 46'; Baráth (yellow card) 73'; Rondić (yellow card) 83' | Stadium: Chorten Arena; Attendance: 18,446; Referee: (Poland) Paweł Raczkowski |

| 9 November 2025 15 | Korona Kielce | 1-4 | Raków Częstochowa | Kielce |
| 14:45 | Dawid Błanik 25'; Remacle (yellow card) 49'; Hubert Zwoźny (yellow card) 65'; Nikolov (yellow card) 90+4'; Sotiriou (yellow card) 90+9' | Report | Adriano 5'; Brunes 20'; Svarnas (yellow card) 49'; Rondić (yellow card) 55'; Makuch 90+2'; Diaby-Fadiga 90+8' (pen.) | Stadium: EXBUD Arena; Attendance: 12,114; Referee: (Poland) Łukasz Kuźma |

=== Polish Cup ===
| 29 October 2025 Round of 32 | Raków Częstochowa | 3–0 | Cracovia | Częstochowa |
| 20:30 CET (UTC+01:00) | Brunes 13', 40'; Diaby-Fadiga 81' | 90minut Łączy nas piłka | | Stadium: zondacrypto Arena; Attendance: 5,023; Referee: Łukasz Kuźma (Białystok) |

| 3 December 2025 Round of 16 | Śląsk Wrocław | 1–2 | Raków Częstochowa | Wrocław |
| 17:30 CET (UTC+01:00) | Warchoł 69' | 90minut Łączy nas piłka | Brunes 43'; Makuch 74' | Stadium: Tarczyński Arena Wrocław; Attendance: 12,103; Referee: Paweł Raczkowski (Warsaw) |

| 5 March 2026 Quarter-final | Avia Świdnik | 1–2 (a.e.t.) | Raków Częstochowa | Świdnik |
| 13:30 CET (UTC+01:00) | Zawadzki 90+3' | Report | Brunes 45+5'; Mosór 92' | Stadium: Stadion Miejski; Attendance: 2,660; Referee: Paweł Malec (Łódź) |

| 9 April 2026 Semi-final | Raków Częstochowa | 4–4 (a.e.t.) (4–2 p) | GKS Katowice | Częstochowa |
| 18:30 CEST (UTC+02:00) | Brunes 47'; Racovițan 49'; Diaby-Fadiga 67'; Czerwiński 112' (o.g.) | 90minut Łączy nas piłka | Jirka 21'; Jędrych 41' (pen.); Zreľák 90'; Markovic 116' | Stadium: zondacrypto Arena; Attendance: 5,500; Referee: Karol Arys (Szczecin) |
| | Penalties |
| | Rocha (penalty scored); Diaby-Fadiga (penalty scored); Struski (penalty scored); Racovițan (penalty scored) | | (penalty scored) Jędrych; (penalty scored) Nowak; (penalty missed) Jirka; (penalty missed) Milewski |

| 2 May 2026 Final | Górnik Zabrze | v | Raków Częstochowa | Warsaw |
| 16:00 CEST (UTC+02:00) | | | | Stadium: PGE Narodowy |

=== UEFA Conference League ===
==== Second qualifying round ====
| 24 July 2025 First leg | Raków Częstochowa (Poland) | 3–0 | (Slovakia) Žilina | Częstochowa |
| 21:00 | Belko 48' (o.g.); Braut Brunes 58' (pen.); Diaby-Fadiga 73' | Report | Minárik (yellow card) 51' (yellow-red card) 63'; Ďuriš (yellow card) 68'; Gidi (yellow card) 69' | Stadium: Miejski Stadion Piłkarski Raków; Referee: Fabio Verissimo (Portugal) |

| 31 July 2025 Second leg | Žilina (Slovakia) | 1–3 (1–6 agg.) | (Poland) Raków Częstochowa | Žilina, Slovakia |
| 20:30 | Ďuriš 13'; Roginić (yellow card) 80' | Report | Makuch 37'; Repka (yellow card) 51'; Braut Brunes 51'; Diaby-Fadiga 72' | Stadium: Štadión pod Dubňom; Referee: Genc Nuza (Kosovo) |

==== Third qualifying round ====
| 7 August 2025 First leg | Raków Częstochowa (Poland) | 0–1 | (Israel) Maccabi Haifa | Częstochowa |
| 21:00 | | Report | | Stadium: Miejski Stadion Piłkarski Raków; Attendance: 5,302; Referee: Rob Harvey (Republic of Ireland) |

| 14 August 2025 Second leg | Maccabi Haifa (Israel) | 0–2 (1–2 agg.) | (Poland) Raków Częstochowa | Debrecen, Hungary |
| 20:00 | | Report | Baráth 45+1'; Diaby-Fadiga 76' (pen.) | Stadium: Nagyerdei Stadion; Attendance: 665; Referee: Jérôme Brisard (France) |

==== Play-off round ====
| 21 August 2025 First leg | Raków Częstochowa (Poland) | 1–0 | (Bulgaria) Arda Kardzhali | Częstochowa |
| | Pieńko 28' | | | Stadium: Miejski Stadion Piłkarski Raków; Attendance: 5,500; Referee: Michal Očenáš (Slovakia) |

| 28 August 2025 Second leg | Arda Kardzhali (Bulgaria) | 1–2 (1–3 agg.) | (Poland) Raków Częstochowa | Kardzhali, Bulgaria |
| 21:00 UTC+3 | Nikolov (yellow card) 48' (yellow-red card) 70'; Vutov 59' (pen.); Velkovski (red card) 90+1'; Shinyashiki (yellow card) 90+5'; Patrick Luan (yellow card) 90+5' | | Baráth 2', (yellow card) 44'; Racovițan (yellow card) 35'; Ivi (penalty missed) 90+3', 90+3'; Díaz (yellow card) 90+5' | Stadium: Arena Arda; Referee: Igor Pajač (Croatia) |

==== League phase ====
| Pos | Team | Pld | W | D | L | GF | GA | GD | Pts | Qualification |
|---|---|---|---|---|---|---|---|---|---|---|
| 1 | (French Football Federation#Table) Strasbourg | 6 | 5 | 1 | 0 | 11 | 5 | +6 | 16 | Advance to round of 16 (seeded) |
| 2 | (Polish Football Association#Table) Raków Częstochowa | 6 | 4 | 2 | 0 | 9 | 2 | +7 | 14 | Advance to round of 16 (seeded) |
| 3 | (Hellenic Football Federation#Table) AEK Athens | 6 | 4 | 1 | 1 | 14 | 7 | +7 | 13 | Advance to round of 16 (seeded) |
| 4 | (Football Association of the Czech Republic#Table) Sparta Prague | 6 | 4 | 1 | 1 | 10 | 3 | +7 | 13 | Advance to round of 16 (seeded) |
| 5 | (Royal Spanish Football Federation#Table) Rayo Vallecano | 6 | 4 | 1 | 1 | 13 | 7 | +6 | 13 | Advance to round of 16 (seeded) |

Source: UEFA
Rules for classification: League phase tiebreakers

| Round | 1 | 2 | 3 | 4 | 5 | 6 |
|---|---|---|---|---|---|---|
| Ground | H | A | A | H | H | A |
| Result | W | D | D | W | W | W |
| Position | 8 | 8 | 12 | 6 | 3 | 2 |

A = Away; H = Home; W = Win; D = Draw; L = Loss

| 2 October 2025 1 | Raków Częstochowa (Poland) | 2–0 | (Romania) Universitatea Craiova | Sosnowiec |
| 21:00 | Pieńko 47'; Repka 80' | Report | | Stadium: Zagłębie Sports Park; Attendance: 6,557; Referee: Ishmael Barbara (Malta) |

| 23 October 2025 2 | Sigma Olomouc (Czech Republic) | 1–1 | (Poland) Raków Częstochowa | Olomouc, Czechia |
| 21:00 | Král 83' | Report | Svarnas 90' | Stadium: Andrův Stadium; Attendance: 8,136; Referee: Pavle Ilić (Serbia) |

| 6 November 2025 3 | Sparta Prague (Czech Republic) | 0–0 | (Poland) Raków Częstochowa | Stadion Letná, Prague |
| 18:45 | | Report | | Attendance: 17,688; Referee: Joonas Jaanovits (Estonia) |

| 27 November 2025 4 | Raków Częstochowa (Poland) | 4–1 | (Austria) Rapid Wien | Zagłębie Sports Park, Sosnowiec |
| 18:45 | Brunes 27' (pen.); Diaby-Fadiga 40', 51', 53' | Report | Antiste 75' | Attendance: 8,457; Referee: Duje Strukan (Croatia) |

| 11 December 2025 5 | Raków Częstochowa (Poland) | 1–0 | (Bosnia and Herzegovina) Zrinjski Mostar | Zagłębie Sports Park, Sosnowiec |
| 21:00 | Brunes 45+5' (pen.) | Report | | Attendance: 7,254; Referee: Ondřej Berka (Czech Republic) |

| 18 December 2025 6 | Omonia (Cyprus) | 0–1 | (Poland) Raków Częstochowa | GSP Stadium, Nicosia |
| 21:00 (22:00 UTC+2) | | Report | Repka 49' | Attendance: 10,327; Referee: Sandro Schärer (Switzerland) |

==== Knockout phase ====
===== Round of 16 =====
| 12 March 2026 First leg | Fiorentina (Italy) | 2–1 | (Poland) Raków Częstochowa | Stadio Artemio Franchi, Florence |
| 21:00 | | Report | | Attendance: 7,852; Referee: Georgi Kabakov (Bulgaria) |

| 19 March 2026 Second leg | Raków Częstochowa (Poland) | 1–2 (2–4 agg.) | (Italy) Fiorentina | Zagłębie Sports Park, Sosnowiec |
| 18:45 | Struski 46' | Report | Piccoli 68'; Pongračić 90+7' | Attendance: 11,043; Referee: Juan Martínez Munuera (Spain) |
