= 2026–27 Raków Częstochowa season =

Raków Częstochowa
2026–27 season
- Manager: Dawid Kroczek (until 31 August); Dawid Szulczek (1–8 September); Tomasz Kaczmarek (8 September–19 October); Dawid Szwarga (from 21 October)
- Stadium: Miejski Stadion Piłkarski Raków
- Ekstraklasa: 16th
- Polish Cup: Round of 16
- UEFA Conference League: Play-off round
- Top goalscorer: League: Patryk Makuch (8); All: Patryk Makuch (8)
Home colours	Away colours

The 2026–27 season is the 106th season in the history of Raków Częstochowa and their eighth consecutive season in the Ekstraklasa. The club will also compete in the Polish Cup and the UEFA Conference League.

== Transfers ==
=== In ===
Pos.	Player	Transferred from	Fee	Date	Source
MF	(Colombia) Jesús Díaz	(Poland) Zagłębie Lubin	Loan return	30 June 2026	
MF	(Poland) Kacper Nowakowski	(Poland) Chrobry Głogów	Loan return	30 June 2026	
MF	(Serbia) Srđan Plavšić	(Czech Republic) Baník Ostrava	Loan return	30 June 2026	
GK	(Poland) Jakub Rajczykowski	(Poland) Polonia Bytom	Loan return	30 June 2026	
GK	(Bosnia and Herzegovina) Muhamed Šahinović	(Croatia) Gorica	Loan return	30 June 2026	
DF	(Ivory Coast) Dieudonné Gaucho Debohi	(France) Caen	Free	1 July 2026	
GK	(Bosnia and Herzegovina) Tarik Karić	(Bosnia and Herzegovina) Velež Mostar	Undisclosed	1 July 2026	
MF	(Poland) Oliwier Kwiatkowski	(Poland) Polonia Bytom	Undisclosed	1 July 2026	
MF	(Poland) Jakub Jendryka	(Poland) Ruch Chorzów	€400,000	3 July 2026	
MF	(Hungary) Ádin Molnár	(Hungary) MTK Budapest	€750,000	8 July 2026	
FW	(Azerbaijan) Mahir Emreli	(Germany) 1. FC Kaiserslautern	Loan	18 July 2026	
MF	(Montenegro) Marko Perović	(Spain) Almería	€1,000,000	5 August 2026	
DF	(Sweden) Arvid Brorsson	(Italy) Monza	Undisclosed	18 August 2026	
DF	(Sweden) Nils Zätterström	(England) Sheffield United	Loan	8 September 2026	

=== Out ===
Pos.	Player	Transferred to	Fee	Date	Source
DF	(Croatia) Zoran Arsenić	(Poland) Legia Warsaw	End of contract	1 July 2026	
MF	(Poland) Kacper Nowakowski	(Poland) ŁKS Łódź	Loan	1 July 2026	
GK	(Poland) Jakub Rajczykowski	(Poland) Świt Szczecin	Loan	1 July 2026	
GK	(Bosnia and Herzegovina) Muhamed Šahinović	(Serbia) Radnički 1923	Loan	1 July 2026	
FW	(Portugal) Leonardo Rocha	(Japan) JEF United Chiba	Undisclosed	4 July 2026	
DF	(Poland) Ariel Mosór	(Poland) Korona Kielce	€500,000	5 July 2026	
FW	(Norway) Jonatan Braut Brunes	(Czech Republic) Sparta Prague	€6,000,000	25 July 2026	
FW	(Spain) Ivi	(Greece) Iraklis	Free	27 July 2026	
MF	(Colombia) Jesús Díaz	(Colombia) Cúcuta Deportivo	Loan	8 August 2026	
DF	(Poland) Paweł Dawidowicz	(Italy) Hellas Verona	Free	18 August 2026	
MF	(Serbia) Srđan Plavšić	(Serbia) Železničar Pančevo	Free	26 August 2026	
MF	(Poland) Michael Ameyaw	(Poland) Korona Kielce	€1,000,000	4 September 2026	

== Pre-season and friendlies ==
27 June 2026 Friendly	Raków Częstochowa (Poland)	2–0	(Poland) Piast Gliwice
11:00	Braut Brunes 12'; Pawłowski 54'

4 July 2026 Friendly	Raków Częstochowa (Poland)	2–0	(Poland) Puszcza Niepołomice
16:00	Diaby-Fadiga 42'; Kočar 52' (o.g.)		(red card) 61'

8 July 2026 Friendly	Zulte Waregem (Belgium)	4–3	(Poland) Raków Częstochowa	Netherlands
11:30	Hedl 7', 17'; Opoku 46'; Aké 50'		Basse 21', 25', 60'

8 July 2026 Friendly	Olympiacos (Greece)	2–1	(Poland) Raków Częstochowa	Netherlands
18:00

11 July 2026 Friendly	PSV Eindhoven (Netherlands)	2–2	(Poland) Raków Częstochowa
14:00

16 July 2026 Friendly	GKS Katowice (Poland)	1–1	(Poland) Raków Częstochowa
12:00

2 October 2026 Friendly	Raków Częstochowa (Poland)	4–1	(Poland) Polonia Bytom
11:30

13 November 2026 Friendly	Raków Częstochowa (Poland)	0–0	(Poland) Lechia Gdańsk
14:30

== Competitions ==
=== Overall record ===
Competition	First match	Last match	Starting round	Final position	Record							
Competition	First match	Last match	Starting round	Final position	Pld	W	D	L	GF	GA	GD	Win %
Ekstraklasa	26 July 2026		Matchday 1		14	4	0	10	23	31	−8	28.57
Polish Cup	27 October 2026		Round of 32		1	0	1	0	1	1	+0	0.00
UEFA Conference League	23 July 2026	27 August 2026	Second qualifying round	Play-off round	6	3	2	1	11	6	+5	50.00
Total					21	7	3	11	35	38	−3	33.33

Source: Competitions

=== Ekstraklasa ===
Pos	Team	Pld	W	D	L	GF	GA	GD	Pts	Qualification or relegation
14	Radomiak Radom	14	4	2	8	17	29	−12	14	
15	Cracovia	14	3	3	8	16	23	−7	12	
16	Raków Częstochowa	14	4	0	10	23	31	−8	12	Relegation to I liga
17	Śląsk Wrocław	14	2	4	8	17	25	−8	10	Relegation to I liga
18	Wieczysta Kraków	14	2	2	10	18	28	−10	8	Relegation to I liga

Updated to match(es) played on 8 November 2026. Source: ekstraklasa.org 90minut.pl
Rules for classification: 1) Points; 2) Head-to-head points; 3) Head-to-head goal difference; 4) Goal difference; 5) Goals scored; 6) Number of wins; 7) Number of away wins; 8) Lower number of points based on yellow and red cards (red card = 3 points, yellow card = 1 point, sending-off = 3 points - including 1 point for first yellow card); 9) Fairplay ranking; 10) Draw.
(Note: Head-to-head record is used only after all the matches between the teams in question have been played)

==== Matches ====
26 July 2026 1	Raków Częstochowa	1–2	Wisła Płock	Częstochowa
14:45	Makuch 68' (pen.)	Report	Flis 37'; Rogelj 49'	Stadium: Miejski Stadion Piłkarski Raków; Attendance: 5,227; Referee: Paweł Malec (Łódź)

2 August 2026 2	Śląsk Wrocław	2–1	Raków Częstochowa	Wrocław
17:30	Marjanac 86'; Samiec-Talar 90'	Report	Emreli 49'	Stadium: Wrocław Stadium; Attendance: 22,841; Referee: Szymon Marciniak (Płock)

16 August 2026 4	Cracovia	2–1	Raków Częstochowa	Kraków
17:30	Hasić 56'; Piła 75'	Report	Makuch 31'	Stadium: Marshal Józef Piłsudski Stadium; Attendance: 10,534; Referee: Paweł Raczkowski (Warszawa)

30 August 2026 6	Raków Częstochowa	2–5	Jagiellonia Białystok	Częstochowa
14:45	Emreli 23'; Jendryka 56'	Report	Imaz 31' (pen.); Prelec 37'; Montóia 76' (pen.); Sow 78'; Sylla 89'	Stadium: Miejski Stadion Piłkarski Raków; Attendance: 5,327; Referee: Patryk Gryckiewicz (Toruń)

3 September 2026 5	Raków Częstochowa	1–2	Górnik Zabrze	Częstochowa
18:00	Emreli 79'	Report	Antiste 6'; Janicki 34'	Stadium: Miejski Stadion Piłkarski Raków; Attendance: 5,203; Referee: Paweł Raczkowski (Warszawa)

6 September 2026 7	Lech Poznań	1–0	Raków Częstochowa	Poznań
17:30	Bengtsson 71'	Report		Stadium: Enea Stadion; Attendance: 33,615; Referee: Damian Kos (Gdańsk)

11 September 2026 8	Raków Częstochowa	2–1	Motor Lublin	Częstochowa
18:00	Makuch 42', 77'	Report	Lukoszek 34'	Stadium: Miejski Stadion Piłkarski Raków; Attendance: 4,759; Referee: Szymon Marciniak (Płock)

15 September 2026 3	Raków Częstochowa	2–3	Zagłębie Lubin	Częstochowa
18:00				Stadium: Miejski Stadion Piłkarski Raków

19 September 2026 9	Korona Kielce	3–2	Raków Częstochowa	Kielce
14:45

9 October 2026 10	Raków Częstochowa	1–4	GKS Katowice	Częstochowa
20:30				Stadium: Miejski Stadion Piłkarski Raków

16 October 2026 11	Wieczysta Kraków	1–2	Raków Częstochowa	Kraków
18:00

24 October 2026 12	Wisła Kraków	2–1	Raków Częstochowa	Kraków
20:15

2 November 2026 13	Raków Częstochowa	3–1	Pogoń Szczecin	Częstochowa
20:30				Stadium: Miejski Stadion Piłkarski Raków

8 November 2026 14	Legia Warsaw	2–4	Raków Częstochowa	Warsaw
17:30

=== Polish Cup ===
27 October 2026 Round of 32	Motor Lublin	1–1 (a.e.t.) (1–3 p)	Raków Częstochowa	Lublin
17:30

=== UEFA Conference League ===
==== Second qualifying round ====
23 July 2026 First leg	Raków Częstochowa (Poland)	3–1	(Malta) Valletta	Częstochowa, Poland
18:30	Emreli 53'; Makuch 78'; Svarnas 90'	Report	Morello 23'	Stadium: Miejski Stadion Piłkarski Raków; Attendance: 5,302; Referee: Kadir Sağlam (Turkey)

30 July 2026 Second leg	Valletta (Malta)	0–4 (1–7 agg.)	(Poland) Raków Częstochowa	Ta' Qali, Malta
19:30		Report	Ameyaw 22'; Pieńko 31'; Molnár 54'; Makuch 78'	Stadium: Centenary Stadium; Attendance: 1,398; Referee: Pavle Ilić (Serbia)

==== Third qualifying round ====
6 August 2026 First leg	Raków Częstochowa (Poland)	0–0	(Sweden) Hammarby IF	Częstochowa, Poland
19:00		Report		Stadium: Miejski Stadion Piłkarski Raków; Attendance: 5,089; Referee: Henrik Nalbandyan (Armenia)

13 August 2026 Second leg	Hammarby IF (Sweden)	0–1 (0–1 agg.)	(Poland) Raków Częstochowa	Stockholm, Sweden
19:00		Report	Svarnas 45+2'	Stadium: 3Arena; Attendance: 19,719; Referee: Luca Pairetto (Italy)

==== Play-off round ====
20 August 2026 First leg	Hajduk Split (Croatia)	2–2	(Poland) Raków Częstochowa	Split, Croatia
21:00	Šego 21'; Dalisson 48'	Report	Emreli 27'; Diaby-Fadiga 90+5'	Stadium: Stadion Poljud; Attendance: 25,362; Referee: Michal Očenáš (Slovak)

27 August 2026 Second leg	Raków Częstochowa (Poland)	2–3 (4–5 agg.)	(Croatia) Hajduk Split	Częstochowa, Poland
19:00	Diaby-Fadiga 61' (pen.); Emreli 88'	Report	Raçi 1'; Šego 66'; Pukštas 94'	Stadium: Miejski Stadion Piłkarski Raków; Attendance: 5,500; Referee: Aliyar Aghayev (Azerbaijan)
