= Zagłębie Sports Park =

Sports complex in Sosnowiec, Poland

Coordinates: 50.2884°N 19.1707°E

ArcelorMittalPark
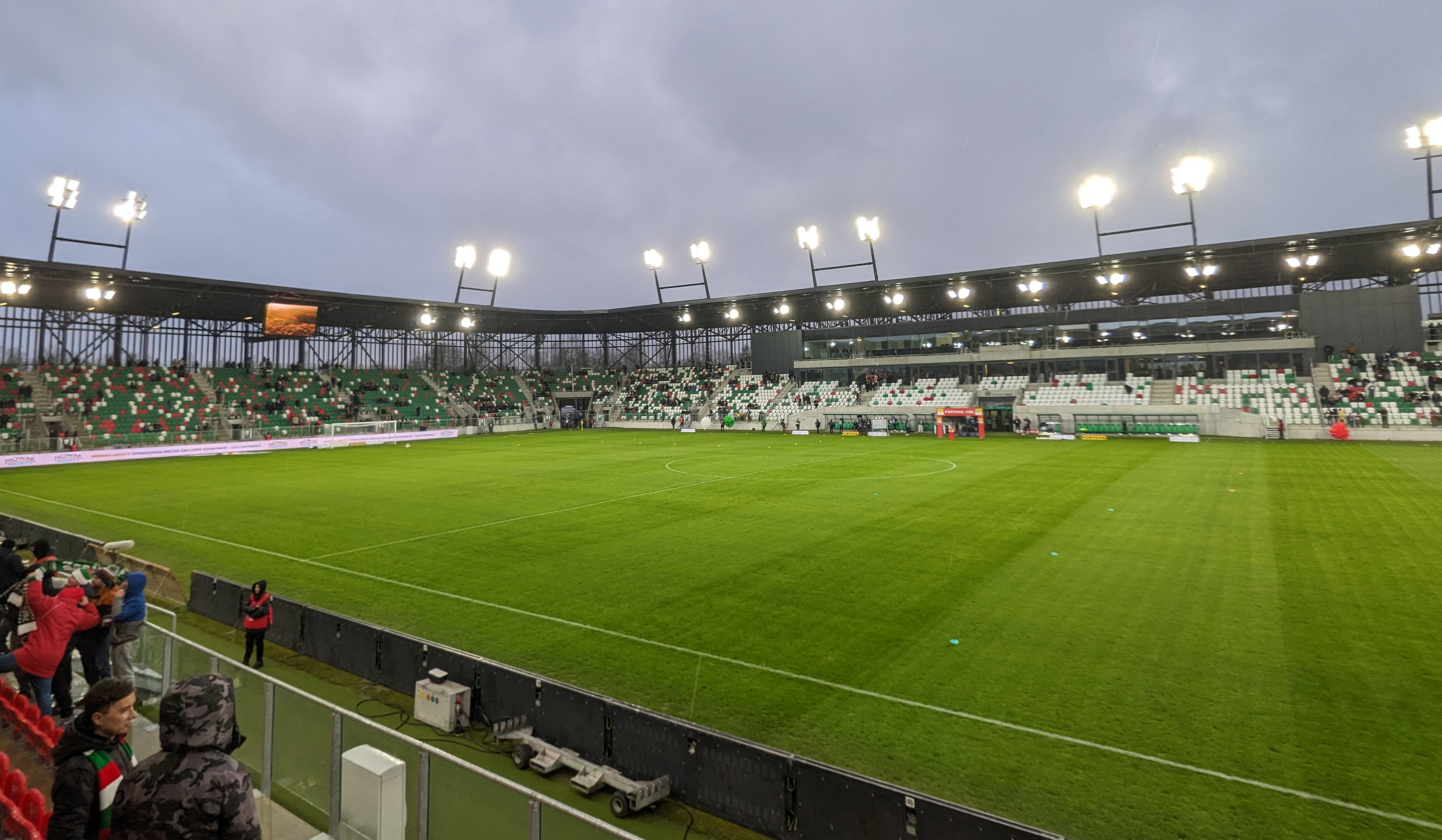
- Football stadium
- Interactive map of ArcelorMittalPark
- Address: ul. gen. Mariusza Zaruskiego 2 Sosnowiec; Poland
- Owner: City of Sosnowiec
- Operator: Zagłębiowski Park Sportowy sp. z o.o.
- Capacity: 11,600 (football stadium); 3,502 (indoor arena); 2,545 (winter stadium)
- Record attendance: Football: 11,600 (Zagłębie Sosnowiec vs. GKS Katowice, 25 February 2023)

Construction
- Groundbreaking: September 2019
- Opened: 25 February 2023
- Cost: 147,9 mln zł

Tenants
- Zagłębie Sosnowiec (2023–present); KH Zagłębie Sosnowiec (2023–present); Wieczysta Kraków (2025–2026); Czarni Sosnowiec (2026–present)

Website
- zps-sosnowiec.pl

Zagłębie Sports Park (Polish: Zagłębiowski Park Sportowy), officially called ArcelorMittal Park for sponsorship reasons, is a sports complex in Środula, Sosnowiec, Poland and is the home of Zagłębie Sosnowiec. It consists of a football stadium, ice hockey arena and indoor arena, the first of which is also being used by Czarni Sosnowiec's women's team to host their games.

== Football stadium ==
With the capacity of 11,600, the football stadium is the main venue of the complex. It is home to Zagłębie Sosnowiec, but it also hosted Raków Częstochowa's home games in European competitions, as Raków's Miejski Stadion Piłkarski "Raków" doesn't meet the UEFA requirements. In the 2025–26 season, it was also used by Wieczysta Kraków due to their stadium not meeting I liga requirements.

The first official match was played there on 25 February 2023, when Zagłębie Sosnowiec took on local rivals GKS Katowice in a I liga game, which was watched by 11,600 spectators.

=== Major matches ===
==== 2023–24 UEFA Champions League ====
22 August 2023
21:00
Play-off round

Raków Częstochowa (Poland)	0–1	(Denmark) Copenhagen
	Report	Racovițan 9' (o.g.)

Attendance: 11,600
Referee: Irfan Peljto (Bosnia and Herzegovina)

==== 2023–24 UEFA Europa League ====
5 October 2023
18:45
Group stage

Raków Częstochowa (Poland)	0–1	(Austria) Sturm Graz
	Report	Bøving 24'

Attendance: 8,993
Referee: Aliyar Aghayev (Azerbaijan)
26 October 2023
18:45
Group stage

Raków Częstochowa (Poland)	1–1	(Portugal) Sporting CP
Piasecki 79'	Report	Coates 14'

Attendance: 10,518
Referee: Anastasios Papapetrou (Greece)
14 December 2023
21:00
Group stage

Raków Częstochowa (Poland)	0–4	(Italy) Atalanta
	Report	Muriel 14', 72'; Bonfanti 27'; De Ketelaere 90+2'

Attendance: 10,386
Referee: Enea Jorgji (Albania)

==== 2025–26 UEFA Conference League ====
2 October 2025
21:00
League phase

Raków Częstochowa (Poland)	2–0	(Romania) Universitatea Craiova
Pieńko 47'; Repka 80'	Report

Attendance: 6,557
Referee: Ishmael Barbara (Malta)

== Stadion Zimowy ==
Winter Stadium (Polish: Stadion Zimowy) is an indoor ice hockey arena. It was opened on 10 June 2023. It meets the International Hockey Federation requirements and is the home to Zagłębie Sosnowiec hockey team.

== Arena Sosnowiec ==
Arena Sosnowiec is an indoor arena. The arena meets the requirements to hold volleyball and basketball matches.

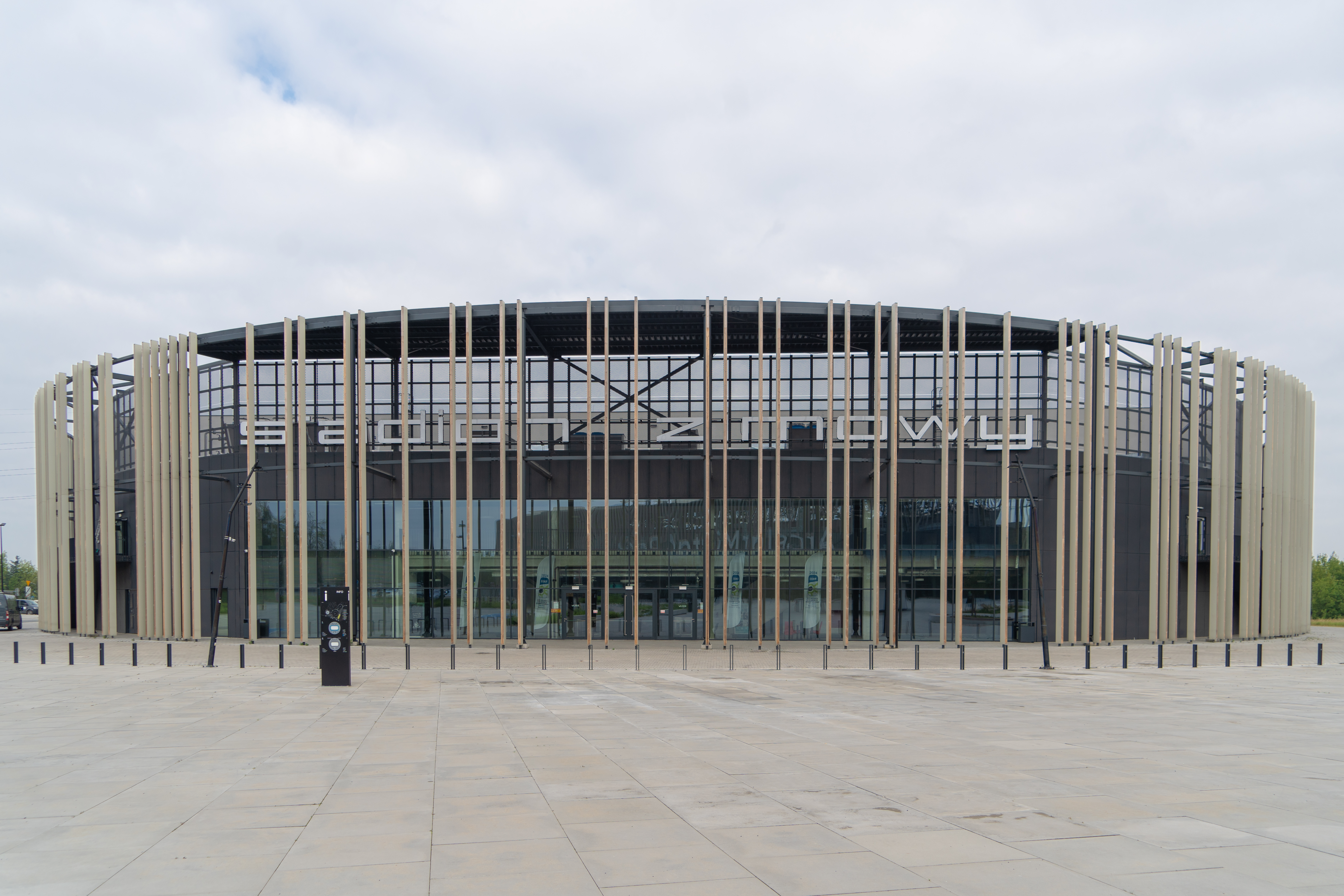
Stadion Zimowy

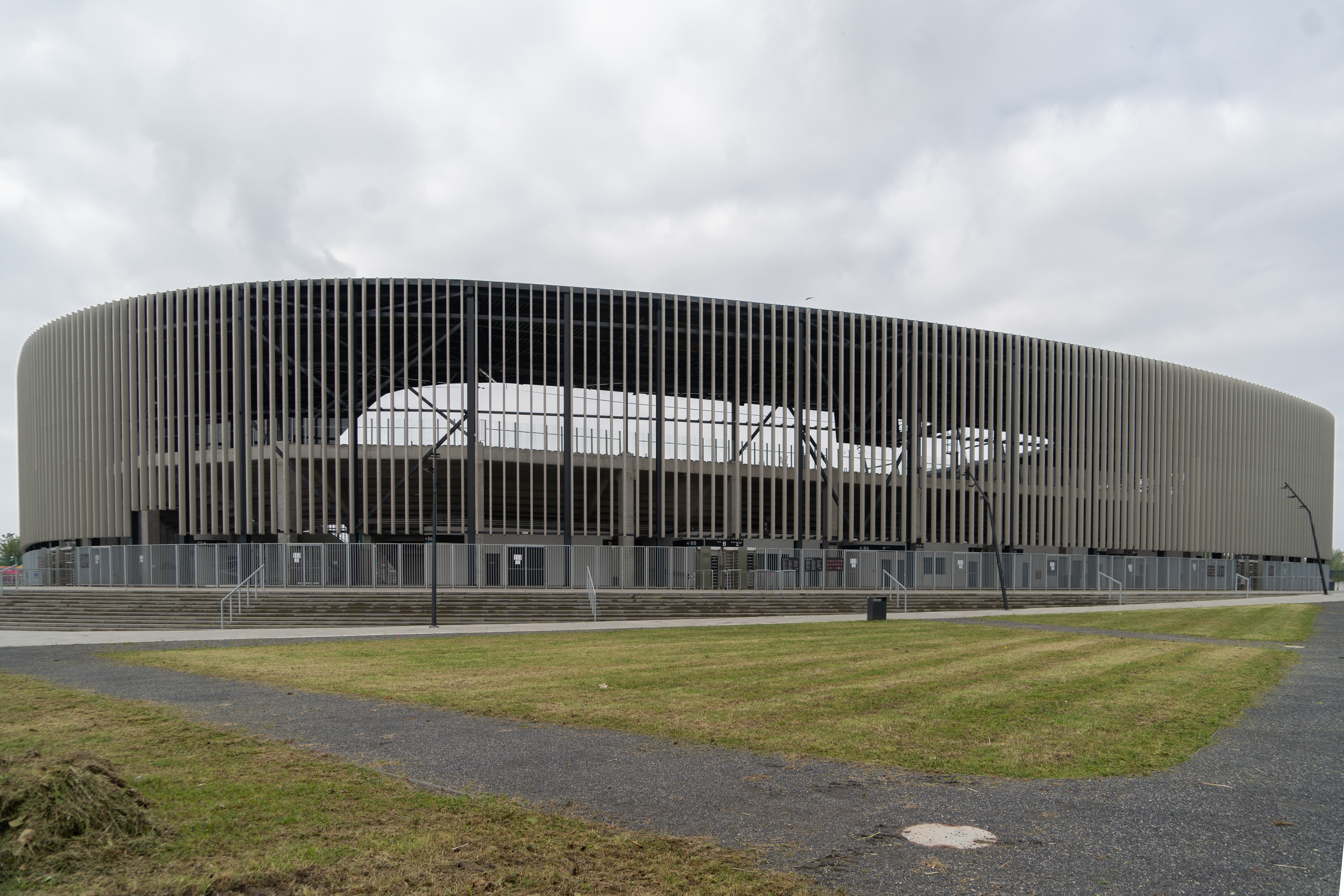
Football stadium

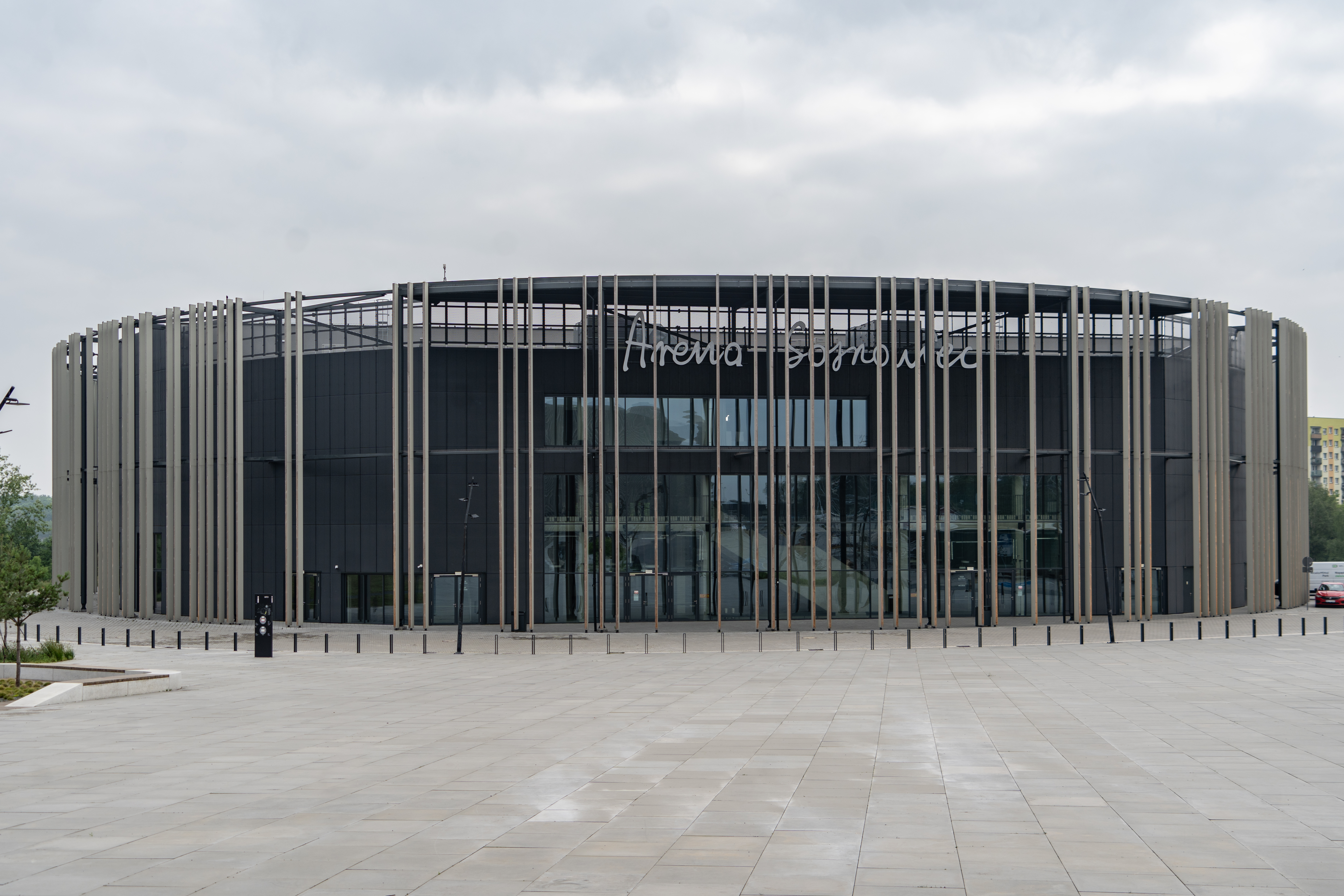
Arena Sosnowiec

=== Notable events ===
==== Basketball ====
- 2023 Polish Basketball Supercup
- 2024 Polish Basketball Cup
- 2025 Polish Basketball Cup
