= Jean Carlos (footballer, born 1996) =

Brazilian footballer

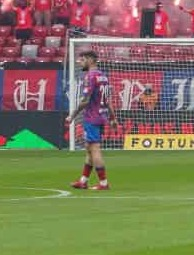
- Jean Carlos in 2023 with Raków Częstochowa

Personal information
- Full name: Jean Carlos Silva Rocha
- Date of birth: 10 May 1996 (age 30)
- Place of birth: Prata, Brazil
- Height: 1.85 m (6 ft 1 in)
- Position: Winger

Team information
- Current team: Raków Częstochowa
- Number: 20

Youth career
- 2007–2008: Yanida
- 2008–2009: Tenerife
- 2009–2010: Parla Escuela
- 2010–2015: Real Madrid

Senior career*
Years	Team	Apps	(Gls)
2015–2016	Real Madrid B	0	(0)
2015–2016	→ Fuenlabrada (loan)	18	(1)
2016–2019	Granada B	77	(4)
2017	Granada	1	(0)
2019–2021	Wisła Kraków	39	(3)
2021–2022	Pogoń Szczecin	49	(3)
2023–	Raków Częstochowa	102	(13)

International career
2015	Brazil U20	5	(1)
Medal record
Men's Football
Representing Brazil
FIFA U-20 World Cup
Runner-up	2015 New Zealand
- * Club domestic league appearances and goals as of 22:05, 28 August 2026 (UTC)

Jean Carlos Silva Rocha (born 10 May 1996), known as Jean Carlos, is a Brazilian professional footballer who plays for Polish club Raków Częstochowa as a winger.

== Club career ==
Born in Prata, Minas Gerais, Jean Carlos moved to Spain in 2007 at the age of 11 and joined Yanida's youth setup. After representing CD Tenerife and CP Parla Escuela, he moved to Real Madrid in 2010.

After finishing his graduation, Jean Carlos was loaned to Segunda División B side CF Fuenlabrada on 28 July 2015, for one year. He made his senior debut on 23 August by starting in a 3–0 away win against Getafe CF B, and scored his first goal on 6 September in a 1–0 home win against CD Guadalajara.

In July 2016, Jean Carlos moved to Granada CF after cutting ties with Los Blancos, and was assigned to the reserves also in the third level. He made his first team – and La Liga – debut on 19 May of the following year, coming on as a second-half substitute for compatriot Andreas Pereira in a 1–2 home loss against RCD Espanyol.

== International career ==
On 28 May 2015, Jean Carlos was called up by Brazil under-20s manager Alexandre Gallo for the year's FIFA U-20 World Cup. He featured in five matches during the tournament, scoring one goal against North Korea on 7 June.

== Career statistics ==
As of match played 27 August 2026

Appearances and goals by club, season and competition
Club	Season	League			National cup (Note: Includes Polish Cup)		Continental		Other		Total	
Club	Season	Division	Apps	Goals	Apps	Goals	Apps	Goals	Apps	Goals	Apps	Goals
Fuenlabrada (loan)	2015–16	Segunda División B	18	1	—		—		—		18	1
Granada B	2016–17	Segunda División B	19	1	—		—		—		19	1
Granada B	2017–18	Segunda División B	24	1	—		—		—		24	1
Granada B	2018–19	Segunda División B	34	2	—		—		—		34	2
Granada B	Total		77	4	—		—		—		77	4
Granada	2016–17	La Liga	1	0	0	0	—		—		1	0
Wisła Kraków	2019–20	Ekstraklasa	17	0	1	0	—		—		18	0
Wisła Kraków	2020–21	Ekstraklasa	22	3	1	0	—		—		23	3
Wisła Kraków	Total		39	3	2	0	—		—		41	3
Pogoń Szczecin	2021–22	Ekstraklasa	34	2	1	0	2 (Note: Appearances in UEFA Conference League)	0	—		37	2
Pogoń Szczecin	2022–23	Ekstraklasa	15	1	2	0	4	0	—		23	3
Pogoń Szczecin	Total		49	3	3	0	6	0	—		58	3
Raków Częstochowa	2022–23	Ekstraklasa	16	3	2	0	—		—		18	3
Raków Częstochowa	2023–24	Ekstraklasa	28	2	0	0	12 (Note: Seven appearances in UEFA Champions League, five appearances in UEFA Europa League)	0	1 (Note: Appearance in Polish Super Cup)	0	41	2
Raków Częstochowa	2024–25	Ekstraklasa	33	5	1	0	—		—		34	5
Raków Częstochowa	2025–26	Ekstraklasa	22	3	4	0	6	0	—		32	3
Raków Częstochowa	2026–27	Ekstraklasa	3	0	0	0	6	0	—		9	0
Raków Częstochowa	Total		102	13	7	0	24	0	1	0	134	13
Career total			286	24	12	0	30	0	1	0	329	24

== Honours ==
Raków Częstochowa

- Ekstraklasa: 2022–23

Individual

- Ekstraklasa Player of the Month: September 2024
