= 2024–25 Raków Częstochowa season =

Raków Częstochowa
2024–25 season
- Manager: Dawid Szwarga
- Stadium: Raków Municipal Stadium
- Ekstraklasa: 2nd
- Polish Cup: First round
- Top goalscorer: League: Jonatan Braut Brunes (14); All: Jonatan Braut Brunes (14)
- Biggest win: Raków Częstochowa 5–1 Zagłębie Lubin
Home colours	Away colours	Third colours

The 2024–25 season was the 104th season in the history of Raków Częstochowa, and the club's sixth consecutive season in Ekstraklasa. In addition to the domestic league, the club participated in the Polish Cup, losing in the first round.

== Transfers ==
=== In ===
Pos.	Player	Transferred from	Fee	Date	Source
GK	(Norway) Kristoffer Klaesson	(England) Leeds United	Undisclosed	7 July 2024	
FW	(Poland) Patryk Makuch	(Poland) Cracovia	€1,000,000	11 July 2024	
FW	(Finland) David Ezeh	(Finland) HJK Helsinki	Loan	22 July 2024	
FW	(Norway) Jonatan Braut Brunes	(Belgium) OH Leuven	Loan	26 July 2024	

=== Out ===
Pos.	Player	Transferred to	Fee	Date	Source
MF	(Greece) Giannis Papanikolaou	(Turkey) Çaykur Rizespor		1 July 2024	
FW	(Poland) Łukasz Zwoliński	(Poland) Wisła Kraków	Undisclosed	15 July 2024	
MF	(Poland) Bartosz Nowak	(Poland) GKS Katowice	Undisclosed	23 July 2024	
GK	(Bosnia and Herzegovina) Muhamed Šahinović	(Slovakia) Zemplín Michalovce	Loan	1 August 2024	
FW	(Croatia) Ante Crnac	(England) Norwich City	Undisclosed	22 August 2024	
FW	(Germany) Sonny Kittel	(Switzerland) Grasshopper	Undisclosed	24 August 2024	

== Friendlies ==
=== Pre-season ===
22 June 2024 Friendly	Miedź Legnica (Poland)	v	(Poland) Raków Częstochowa
11:00

29 June 2024 Friendly	Raków Częstochowa (Poland)	5–1	(Poland) Stal Rzeszów	Arłamów
16:30	Jean Carlos 27'; Berggren 39'; Walczak 59', 71'; Pawlowski 86'	Report	Wachowiak 50'	Stadium: Arłamów Arena

3 July 2024 Friendly	Raków Częstochowa (Poland)	1–1	(Poland) Puszcza Niepołomice	Arłamów
11:00	Walczak 55'		Cholewiak 4'	Stadium: Arłamów Arena

6 July 2024 Friendly	Raków Częstochowa (Poland)	v	(Poland) Wieczysta Kraków

6 July 2024 Friendly	Raków Częstochowa (Poland)	0–0	(Israel) Maccabi Tel Aviv	Busko Zdrój
16:00				Stadium: Stadion Miejski

12 July 2024 Friendly	Raków Częstochowa (Poland)	1–1	(Poland) Odra Opole	Zawodzie
10:45	Nowak 2'		Purzycki 47' (pen.)	Stadium: Obiekt Sportowy Gminy Poczesna

12 July 2024 Friendly	Raków Częstochowa (Poland)	2–0	(Cyprus) AC Omonia	Kielce
17:00	Crnac 9'; Makuch 33'			Stadium: stadion przy ul. Szczepaniaka

=== Mid-season ===
8 January 2025 Friendly	Raków Częstochowa (Poland)	3–2	(Czech Republic) Sigma Olomouc
13:00

15 January 2025 Friendly	Raków Częstochowa (Poland)	2–2	(Czech Republic) Slavia Prague
16:00

19 January 2025 Friendly	Raków Częstochowa (Poland)	2–0	(Hungary) Diósgyőri VTK
16:00

24 January 2025 Friendly	Raków Częstochowa (Poland)	0–1	(Czech Republic) Slovan Liberec

24 January 2025 Friendly	Vancouver Whitecaps FC (Canada)	2–3	(Poland) Raków Częstochowa

== Competitions ==
=== Overall record ===
Competition	First match	Last match	Starting round	Record							
Competition	First match	Last match	Starting round	Pld	W	D	L	GF	GA	GD	Win %
Ekstraklasa	21 July 2024	24–25 May 2025	Matchday 1	3	2	0	1	3	1	+2	66.67
Polish Cup				0	0	0	0	0	0	+0	—
Total				3	2	0	1	3	1	+2	66.67

Last updated: 3 August 2024
Source: Soccerway

=== Ekstraklasa ===
==== League table ====
Pos	Team	Pld	W	D	L	GF	GA	GD	Pts	Qualification or relegation
1	Lech Poznań (C)	34	22	4	8	68	31	+37	70	Qualification for Champions League second qualifying round
2	Raków Częstochowa	34	20	9	5	51	23	+28	69	Qualification for Conference League second qualifying round
3	Jagiellonia Białystok	34	17	10	7	56	42	+14	61	Qualification for Conference League second qualifying round
4	Pogoń Szczecin	34	17	7	10	59	40	+19	58	
5	Legia Warsaw	34	15	9	10	60	45	+15	54	Qualification for Europa League first qualifying round (Note: The 2024–25 Polish Cup winners (Legia Warsaw) qualify for the Europa League first qualifying round.)

Source: ekstraklasa.org 90minut.pl
Rules for classification: 1) Points; 2) Head-to-head points; 3) Head-to-head goal difference; 4) Goal difference; 5) Goals scored; 6) Number of wins; 7) Number of away wins; 8) Lower number of points based on yellow and red cards (red card = 3 points, yellow card = 1 point, sending-off = 3 points - including 1 point for first yellow card); 9) Fairplay ranking; 10) Draw.
(Note: Head-to-head record is used only after all the matches between the teams in question have been played)
(C) Champions

==== Results summary ====
Overall								Home						Away					
Pld	W	D	L	GF	GA	GD	Pts	W	D	L	GF	GA	GD	W	D	L	GF	GA	GD
26	16	7	3	39	16	+23	55	7	3	3	20	11	+9	9	4	0	19	5	+14

Last updated: 31 March 2025.
Source: soccerway

==== Results by round ====
Round	1	2	3	4	5	6	7	8	9	10	11	12	13	14	15	16	17	18	19	20	21	22	23	24	25	26	27	28	29	30	31	32	33	34
Ground	A	H	A	H	A	A	H	A	H	H	A	H	A	H	A	H	A	H	A	H	A	H	H	A	H	A	A	H	A	H	A	H	A	H
Result	W	L	W	D	D	W	L	W	W	W	W	W	D	W	D	D	W	D	D	L	W	W	W	W	W	W								
Position	2	8	6	7	6	5	7	6	4	3	2	2	3	3	3	3	2	2	3	3	3	2	2	2	1	1								

Updated to match(es) played on 31 March 2025. Source: Worldfootball
A = Away; H = Home; W = Win; D = Draw; L = Loss

==== Matches ====
21 July 2024 1	Motor Lublin	0–2	Raków Częstochowa	Lublin
20:15	Rudol (yellow card) 45'		Adriano (yellow card) 37'; Crnac 32', (yellow card) 82'; Racovițan (yellow card) 76'; Drachal 87'	Stadium: Arena Lublin; Attendance: 14,158; Referee: Jarosław Przybył

29 July 2024 2	Raków Częstochowa	0–1	Cracovia	Częstochowa
19:00 UTC+2	Pestka (yellow card) 73'; Jean Carlos (yellow card) 77'		Al-Ammari (yellow card) 43'; Maigaard 48'; Jugas (yellow card) 60'	Stadium: Raków Municipal Stadium; Referee: Tomasz Kwiatkowski

3 August 2024 3	GKS Katowice	0–1	Raków Częstochowa	Katowice
14:45			Jean Carlos 29'	Stadium: GKS Katowice Stadium; Referee: Bartosz Frankowski

9 August 2024 4	Raków Częstochowa	0–0	Lech Poznań	Częstochowa
20:30 UTC+2				Stadium: Raków Municipal Stadium

18 August 2024 5	Górnik Zabrze	0–0	Raków Częstochowa	Zabrze
20:15 UTC+2				Stadium: Arena Zabrze

23 August 2024 6	Lechia Gdańsk	1–2	Raków Częstochowa	Gdańsk
20:30 UTC+2				Stadium: Gdańsk Stadium

30 August 2024 7	Raków Częstochowa	0–1	Piast Gliwice	Częstochowa
18:00 UTC+2				Stadium: Raków Municipal Stadium

15 September 2024 8	Legia Warsaw	0–1	Raków Częstochowa	Warsaw
17:30 UTC+2				Stadium: Polish Army Stadium

22 September 2024 9	Raków Częstochowa	5–1	Zagłębie Lubin	Częstochowa
14:45 UTC+2				Stadium: Raków Municipal Stadium

28 September 2024 10	Raków Częstochowa	2–0	Puszcza Niepołomice	Częstochowa
14:45 UTC+2				Stadium: Raków Municipal Stadium

5 October 2024 11	Radomiak Radom	0–2	Raków Częstochowa	Radom
14:45 UTC+2	Paulo Henrique (yellow card) 18'; Ouattara (yellow card) 28'; Raphael Rossi (yellow card) 42'; Alves (yellow card) 65'	Report	Ivi 33'; Mosór (yellow card) 64'; Kocherhin 90+1'	Stadium: Czachor Brothers Stadium; Attendance: 8,545; Referee: (Poland) Jarosław Przybył

20 October 2024 12	Raków Częstochowa	1–0	Pogoń Szczecin	Częstochowa
17:30 CET	Rodin (yellow card) 90+10' (yellow-red card) 90+14' (goal) 90+13'	Report	Keramitsis (red card) 65'	Stadium: Raków Municipal Stadium; Attendance: 5,443; Referee: (Poland) Paweł Raczkowski

26 October 2024 13	Śląsk Wrocław	0–0	Raków Częstochowa	Wrocław
17:30 CET	Petkov (yellow card) 4'; Leszczyński (yellow card) 71'	Report	Berggren (yellow card) 34'; Amorim (yellow card) 58'; Baráth (yellow card) 89'	Stadium: Tarczyński Arena; Attendance: 16,265; Referee: (Poland) Szymon Marciniak

2 November 2024 14	Raków Częstochowa	1–0	Stal Mielec	Częstochowa
14:45 CET	Ivi (yellow card) 27'; Baráth (yellow card) 48'; Braut Brunes 90+4' (pen.)	Report	Matras (yellow card) 37'; Bagalianis (yellow card) 78'; Robert Dadok (yellow card) 89'	Stadium: Raków Municipal Stadium; Attendance: 5,287; Referee: (Poland) Tomasz Kwiatkowski

10 November 2024 15	Jagiellonia Białystok	2–2	Raków Częstochowa	Białystok
14:45 CET	Afimico Pululu (yellow card) 31' (goal) 90+11' (pen.); Jesús Imaz 68'; João Moutinho (yellow card) 88'; Nené (yellow card) 88'; Sáček (yellow card) 90+9'	Report	Ivi 4' (pen.); Baráth (yellow card) 73'; Arsenić 87'; Svarnas (yellow card) 90+7'; Berggren (yellow card) 90+8' (yellow-red card) 90+8'	Stadium: Chorten Arena; Attendance: 17,089; Referee: (Poland) Jarosław Przybył

=== Polish Cup ===
25 September 2024 First round	Miedź Legnica	0–0 (a.e.t.) (4–3 p)	Raków Częstochowa
19:00 UTC+2
