= Adam Basse =

Polish footballer (born 2007)

Personal information
- Date of birth: 4 November 2007 (age 19)
- Place of birth: New York City, New York, U.S
- Height: 1.96 m (6 ft 5 in)
- Position: Forward

Team information
- Current team: Raków Częstochowa
- Number: 99

Youth career
- –2022: Cedar Stars Rush
- 2022–2023: New York City FC

Senior career*
Years	Team	Apps	(Gls)
2024	New York City FC II	4	(0)
2024–2025	Śląsk Wrocław	3	(0)
2024–2025	Śląsk Wrocław II	2	(0)
2025–	Raków Częstochowa	9	(0)
2025–	Raków Częstochowa II	14	(12)
2025–2026	→ Puszcza Niepołomice (loan)	7	(0)
2025–2026	→ Puszcza Niepołomice II (loan)	2	(1)
2026	→ Hutnik Kraków (loan)	12	(4)

International career^{‡}
2024–2025	Poland U18	5	(1)
2025	Poland U19	2	(0)
2026–	Poland U20	4	(1)
- * Club domestic league appearances and goals as of 14:01, 10 November 2026 (UTC) ‡ National team caps and goals as of 21:30, 19 November 2026 (UTC)

Adam Basse (born 4 November 2007) is a professional footballer who plays as a forward for Ekstraklasa club Raków Częstochowa. Born in the United States, he represents Poland at youth level.

== Club career ==
=== Early career ===
A right-footed forward, he has been described as "boasting an impressive physical profile".

As a youth player, he joined the youth academy of American side Cedar Stars Rush. In 2022, he moved to the youth setup of American club New York City FC.

=== Śląsk Wrocław ===
On 31 August 2024, Basse signed a two-year deal with Polish side Śląsk Wrocław with an option for a further year. On 26 October 2024, he debuted for the club during a 0–0 draw with Raków Częstochowa. In February 2025, after refusing to join third-tier club Hutnik Kraków on loan, Basse was sent to the reserve team.

=== Rakow Częstochowa ===
On 24 February 2025, Basse signed a three-year deal with Polish top-flight side Raków Częstochowa for a reported fee of €250,000.

==== Loan to Puszcza Niepołomice ====
On 29 August 2025, Basse moved to I liga club Puszcza Niepołomice on a season-long loan.

==== Loan to Hutnik Kraków ====
After featuring rarely for Puszcza, on 19 January 2026 Basse was sent on loan to Hutnik Kraków for the remainder the end of the season.

== International career ==
In late October 2024, he was called up to the Poland under-18s for a set of friendlies. He scored on his debut in a 3–1 win over England on 15 November.

== Personal life ==
Basse was born on 4 November 2007 in New York City, United States, to a Senegalese father, a basketball player, and a Polish mother, a special education teacher. He has a younger sister, and speaks Polish fluently. He holds triple citizenship - American, Polish and Senegalese.

== Career statistics ==
As of match played 27 October 2026

Appearances and goals by club, season and competition
Club	Season	League			National cup (Note: Includes Polish Cup)		Europe		Other		Total	
Club	Season	Division	Apps	Goals	Apps	Goals	Apps	Goals	Apps	Goals	Apps	Goals
New York City FC II	2024	MLS Next Pro	4	0	—		—		—		4	0
Śląsk Wrocław	2024–25	Ekstraklasa	3	0	0	0	—		—		3	0
Śląsk Wrocław II	2024–25	III liga, gr. III	2	0	—		—		—		2	0
Raków Częstochowa	2024–25	Ekstraklasa	0	0	—		—		—		0	0
Raków Częstochowa	2026–27	Ekstraklasa	9	0	1	0	1 (Note: Appearance in UEFA Conference League)	0	—		11	0
Raków Częstochowa	Total		9	0	1	0	1	0	—		11	0
Raków Częstochowa II	2024–25	IV liga Silesia	12	10	—		—		1 (Note: Appearance in IV liga promotion play-offs)	0	13	10
Raków Częstochowa II	2026–27	III liga, gr. III	1	2	—		—		—		1	2
Raków Częstochowa II	Total		13	12	—		—		1	0	14	12
Puszcza Niepołomice (loan)	2025–26	I liga	7	0	2	1	—		—		9	1
Puszcza Niepołomice II (loan)	2025–26	IV liga Lesser Poland	2	1	—		—		—		2	1
Hutnik Kraków (loan)	2025–26	II liga	12	4	—		—		—		12	4
Career total			52	17	3	1	1	0	1	0	57	18
