= Péter Baráth =

Hungarian footballer

Personal information
- Full name: Péter Baráth
- Date of birth: 21 February 2002 (age 24)
- Place of birth: Kisvárda, Hungary
- Height: 1.85 m (6 ft 1 in)
- Position: Central midfielder

Team information
- Current team: Sigma Olomouc
- Number: 88

Youth career
- 2015–2016: Kisvárda
- 2016–2020: Debrecen

Senior career*
Years	Team	Apps	(Gls)
2020–2023	Debrecen	76	(9)
2020–2022	Debrecen II	10	(2)
2023	→ Ferencváros (loan)	8	(0)
2023–2025	Ferencváros	7	(0)
2024–2025	→ Raków Częstochowa (loan)	35	(2)
2025–2026	Raków Częstochowa	15	(1)
2026–	Sigma Olomouc	14	(2)

International career^{‡}
2018–2019	Hungary U17	12	(4)
2019	Hungary U18	2	(0)
2021–2024	Hungary U21	21	(2)
2022–	Hungary	4	(0)
- * Club domestic league appearances and goals as of 27 May 2026 ‡ National team caps and goals as of 23:12, 9 June 2026 (UTC)

Péter Baráth (born 21 February 2002) is a Hungarian professional footballer who plays as a central midfielder for Czech First League club Sigma Olomouc and the Hungary national team.

== Club career ==
=== Ferencváros ===
On 14 February 2023, Baráth joined Hungarian champions Ferencváros.

On 12 March 2023, he made his first appearance against Puskás Akadémia at the Groupama Arena.

On 5 May 2023, he won the 2022–23 Nemzeti Bajnokság I with Ferencváros, after Kecskemét lost 1–0 to Honvéd at the Bozsik Aréna on the 30th matchday.

==== 2023–24 season ====
On 6 August 2023, he made his first appearance in the 2023–24 season in a 5–3 victory against Fehérvár at the Sóstói Stadion.

=== Raków Częstochowa ===
On 19 January 2024, Baráth joined Polish Ekstraklasa side Raków Częstochowa on a year-long loan, with an option to make the move permanent. On 13 January the following year, his loan was extended until the end of the season.

On 31 July 2025, Baráth rejoined Raków on a permanent basis, signing a five-year deal.

=== Sigma Olomouc ===
On 15 January 2026, Baráth signed a contract with Czech First League club Sigma Olomouc.

== International career ==
Baráth was called up by the senior Hungary team for the Nations League matches against England, Italy, Germany and England on 4, 7, 11 and 14 June 2022 respectively.

== Career statistics ==
=== Club ===
As of match played 23 May 2026

Appearances and goals by club, season and competition
Club	Season	League			National cup (Note: Includes Magyar Kupa, Polish Cup)		Continental		Other		Total	
Club	Season	Division	Apps	Goals	Apps	Goals	Apps	Goals	Apps	Goals	Apps	Goals
Debrecen II	2019–20	Nemzeti Bajnokság III	4	1	—		—		—		4	1
Debrecen II	2020–21	Nemzeti Bajnokság III	5	1	—		—		—		5	1
Debrecen II	2021–22	Nemzeti Bajnokság III	1	0	—		—		—		1	0
Debrecen II	Total		10	2	0	0	0	0	0	0	10	2
Debrecen	2019–20	Nemzeti Bajnokság I	7	0	0	0	—		—		7	0
Debrecen	2020–21	Nemzeti Bajnokság II	22	5	3	0	—		—		25	5
Debrecen	2021–22	Nemzeti Bajnokság I	32	2	2	0	—		—		34	2
Debrecen	2022–23	Nemzeti Bajnokság I	15	2	2	0	—		—		17	2
Debrecen	Total		76	9	7	0	0	0	0	0	83	9
Ferencváros (loan)	2022–23	Nemzeti Bajnokság I	8	0	0	0	0	0	—		8	0
Ferencváros	2023–24	Nemzeti Bajnokság I	7	0	0	0	2 (Note: Appearances in UEFA Champions League)	0	—		9	0
Ferencváros	Total		15	0	0	0	2	0	—		17	0
Raków Częstochowa (loan)	2023–24	Ekstraklasa	10	0	1	0	—		—		11	0
Raków Częstochowa (loan)	2024–25	Ekstraklasa	25	2	1	0	—		—		26	2
Raków Częstochowa	2025–26	Ekstraklasa	15	1	2	0	10 (Note: Appearances in UEFA Conference League)	2	—		27	3
Raków Częstochowa	Total		50	3	4	0	10	2	—		64	5
Sigma Olomouc	2025–26	Czech First League	14	2	—		4	0	—		18	2
Career total			165	16	11	0	16	2	0	0	192	18

=== International ===
As of match played 9 June 2026

Appearances and goals by national team and year
National team	Year	Apps	Goals
Hungary	2022	1	0
Hungary	2023	1	0
Hungary	2026	2	0
Total		4	0

== Honours ==
Debrecen

- Nemzeti Bajnokság II: 2020–21

Ferencváros

- Nemzeti Bajnokság I: 2022–23
