= Bogdan Racovițan =

Romanian footballer (born 2000)

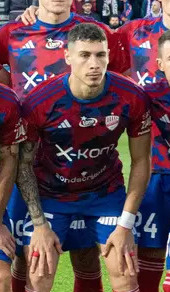
- Racovițan with Raków Częstochowa in 2023

Personal information
- Date of birth: 6 June 2000 (age 26)
- Place of birth: Dijon, France
- Height: 1.87 m (6 ft 2 in)
- Position: Centre-back

Team information
- Current team: Raków Częstochowa
- Number: 25

Youth career
- 2012–2019: Dijon

Senior career*
Years	Team	Apps	(Gls)
2019–2021	Dijon B	23	(2)
2021–2022	Botoșani	24	(1)
2022–	Raków Częstochowa	96	(6)

International career^{‡}
2021–2023	Romania U21	10	(1)
2024–	Romania	6	(0)
- * Club domestic league appearances and goals as of 22 November 2026 ‡ National team caps and goals as of 2 October 2026

Bogdan Racovițan (Romanian pronunciation: [boɡˈdan rakoviˈtsan]; 6 June 2000) is a professional footballer who plays as a centre-back for Ekstraklasa club Raków Częstochowa. Born in France, he represents the Romania national team.

== Club career ==
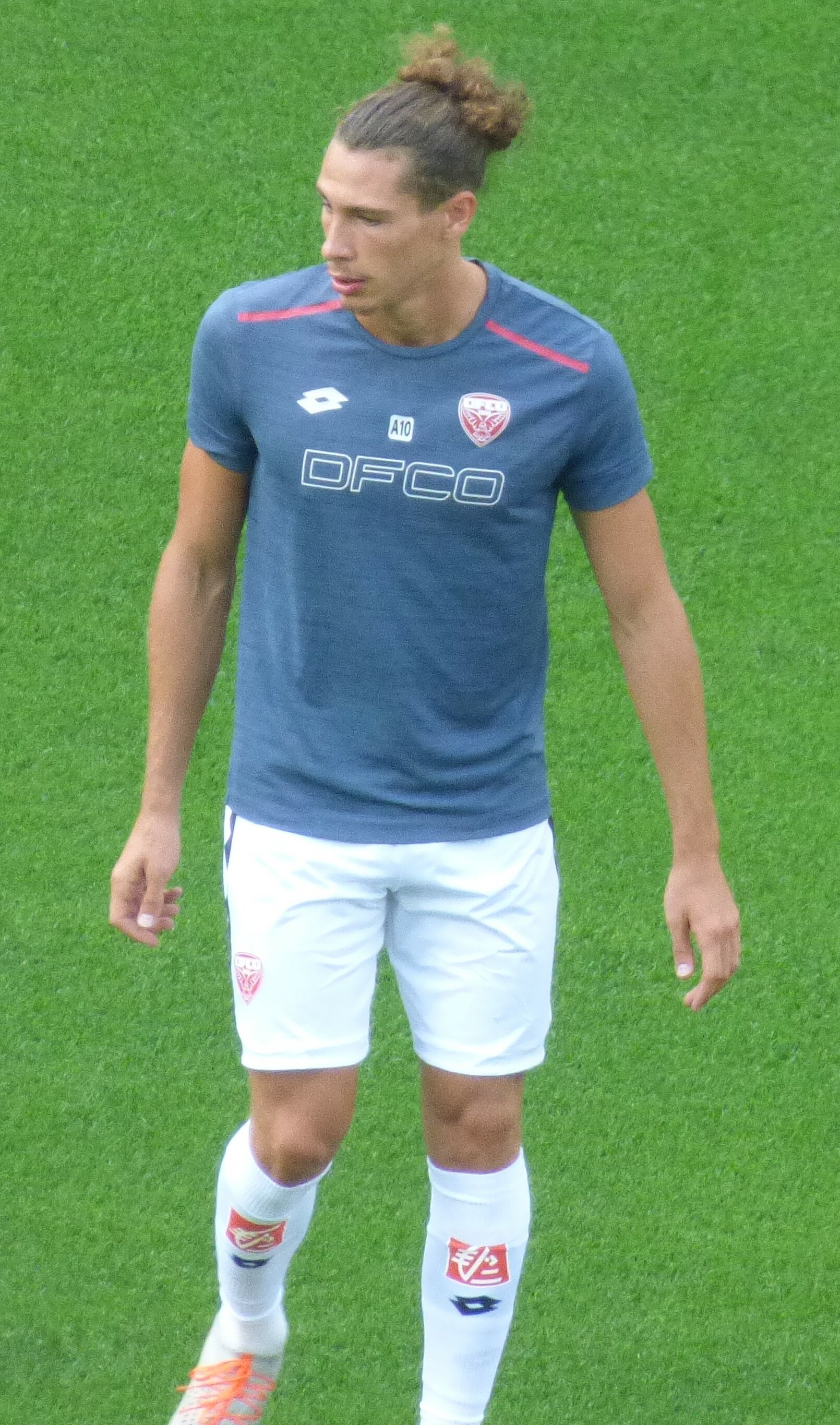
Racovițan in 2020 with Dijon

=== Dijon ===
Born in France, Racovițan served as captain for Dijon's youth sides and its reserves team. With the latter, he totalled 23 games and two goals in the Championnat National 3 between 2019 and 2021.

=== Botoșani ===
In February 2021, aged 20, Racovițan signed for Botoșani in Romania. He recorded his debut for the team on 6 May, in a 3–1 Liga I home loss to FCSB. On 23 October, he netted his first league goal in a 1–1 draw at Mioveni.

=== Raków Częstochowa ===
On 27 January 2022, he moved to Polish side Raków Częstochowa on a three-and-a-half-year deal. In the 2022–23 season, he won the Ekstraklasa title.

On 3 August 2024, Racovițan suffered an ACL rupture in a 0–1 away win over GKS Katowice, ruling him out for the rest of the 2024–25 season.

== International career ==
Racovițan participated with the Romania U21 team in the 2023 UEFA European Under-21 Championship, where he started all three group stage matches.

In September 2023, Racovițan received his first call-up to the Romania senior national team by head coach Edward Iordănescu, for two UEFA Euro 2024 qualifying matches against Israel and Kosovo. He made his debut on 22 March 2024, coming on as a substitute in a 1–1 friendly draw against Northern Ireland.

In June 2024, he made Romania's final squad for UEFA Euro 2024. He made two appearances during the tournament, in a 3–0 group stage win over Ukraine and a 0–3 loss to the Netherlands in the round of 16, both as a substitute.

== Personal life ==
Racovițan was born in Dijon to a French mother and Romanian father from Oradea. He stated that he dreamed of representing the Romania national team.

== Career statistics ==
=== Club ===
As of match played 8 November 2026

Appearances and goals by club, season and competition
Club	Season	League			National cup (Note: Includes Cupa României, Polish Cup)		Europe		Other		Total	
Club	Season	Division	Apps	Goals	Apps	Goals	Apps	Goals	Apps	Goals	Apps	Goals
Dijon B	2018–19	Championnat National 3	4	0	—		—		—		4	0
Dijon B	2019–20	Championnat National 3	15	2	—		—		—		15	2
Dijon B	2020–21	Championnat National 3	4	0	—		—		—		4	0
Dijon B	Total		23	2	—		—		—		23	2
Botoșani	2020–21	Liga I	2	0	0	0	—		—		2	0
Botoșani	2021–22	Liga I	22	1	1	0	—		—		23	1
Botoșani	Total		24	1	1	0	—		—		25	1
Raków Częstochowa	2021–22	Ekstraklasa	3	0	0	0	—		—		3	0
Raków Częstochowa	2022–23	Ekstraklasa	13	1	0	0	2 (Note: Appearances in UEFA Conference League)	0	1 (Note: Appearance in Polish Super Cup)	0	16	0
Raków Częstochowa	2023–24	Ekstraklasa	33	3	3	0	11 (Note: Six appearances in UEFA Champions League, five appearances in UEFA Europa League)	0	1	0	48	3
Raków Częstochowa	2024–25	Ekstraklasa	3	0	0	0	—		—		3	0
Raków Częstochowa	2025–26	Ekstraklasa	30	0	5	1	13	0	—		48	1
Raków Częstochowa	2026–27	Ekstraklasa	13	1	0	0	5	0	—		18	1
Raków Częstochowa	Total		95	5	8	1	31	0	2	0	136	6
Career total			142	8	9	1	31	0	2	0	184	9

=== International ===
As of match played 2 October 2025

Appearances and goals by national team and year
National team	Year	Apps	Goals
Romania	2024	4	0
Romania	2025	1	0
Romania	2026	1	0
Total		6	0

== Honours ==
Raków Częstochowa

- Ekstraklasa: 2022–23
- Polish Cup: 2021–22, runner-up: 2022–23, 2025–26
- Polish Super Cup: 2022, runner-up: 2023
