= Jonatan Braut Brunes =

Norwegian footballer (born 2000)

Personal information
- Full name: Jonatan Braut Brunes
- Date of birth: 7 August 2000 (age 26)
- Place of birth: Bryne, Norway
- Height: 1.89 m (6 ft 2 in)
- Position: Striker

Team information
- Current team: Sparta Prague
- Number: 14

Youth career
- 2005–2015: Bryne

Senior career*
Years	Team	Apps	(Gls)
2015–2018	Bryne 2	60	(15)
2016–2019	Bryne	34	(2)
2019	→ Sola 2 (loan)	1	(2)
2019	→ Sola (loan)	15	(4)
2020	Florø	13	(10)
2020	→ Lillestrøm (loan)	3	(0)
2021	Lillestrøm 2	6	(10)
2021–2022	Lillestrøm	17	(1)
2022	→ Start (loan)	15	(12)
2022–2023	Strømsgodset	29	(9)
2023–2025	OH Leuven	31	(3)
2024–2025	→ Raków Częstochowa (loan)	32	(14)
2025–2026	Raków Częstochowa	32	(16)
2026–	Sparta Prague	13	(6)
- * Club domestic league appearances and goals as of 08:50, 9 November 2026 (UTC)

Jonatan Braut Brunes (born 7 August 2000) is a Norwegian professional footballer who plays as a striker for Czech First League club Sparta Prague.

== Career ==
Brunes started his career in Bryne, making his debut in the 2016 1. divisjon, becoming the youngest player to ever play for the club. He spent the spring of 2019 in Sola FK before joining fellow third-tiers Florø. After 10 goals in 13 games in the 2020 2. divisjon, he was loaned by Lillestrøm. Ahead of the 2021 season the move was made permanent. He made his Eliteserien debut in May 2021 against Viking, scoring Lillestrøm's only goal.

On 14 August 2023, Brunes signed a three-year contract with Belgian Pro League club OH Leuven. He made his debut for the club four days later, replacing Nathan Opoku in the 60th minute of a 1–1 league draw against defending champions Antwerp. On 17 September, he scored his first goal for the club, opening the score by tapping home Richie Sagrado's pass in the sixth minute of an eventual home draw against Gent. After the 2023–24 season, Brunes was loaned out to Ekstraklasa club Raków Częstochowa. He made his debut for the club on 29 July 2024 in a 0–1 home loss to Cracovia, and scored his first goal on 23 August in a 2–1 win over Lechia Gdańsk. Brunes would go on to score 14 goals for the club and on 28 May 2025 Raków Częstochowa announced they had exercised the buy option to make the deal permanent.

On 25 July 2026, Brunes signed a multi-year contract with Czech First League club Sparta Prague.

== Personal life ==
Brunes is a member of the Braut footballing family. His younger sister, Emma Braut Brunes, plays as a defender for SK Brann. His first cousins, Erling Haaland and Albert Braut Tjåland, both play as strikers for Manchester City and Rosseland respectively.

== Career statistics ==
As of match played 23 May 2026

Appearances and goals by club, season and competition
Club	Season	League			National cup (Note: Includes Norwegian Cup, Belgian Cup, Polish Cup)		Europe		Total	
Club	Season	Division	Apps	Goals	Apps	Goals	Apps	Goals	Apps	Goals
Bryne 2	2015	3. divisjon	1	0	—		—		1	0
Bryne 2	2016	3. divisjon	25	5	—		—		25	5
Bryne 2	2017	3. divisjon	19	2	—		—		19	2
Bryne 2	2018	4. divisjon	15	8	—		—		15	8
Bryne 2	Total		60	15	—		—		60	15
Bryne	2016	1. divisjon	1	0	0	0	—		1	0
Bryne	2017	2. divisjon	4	1	0	0	—		4	1
Bryne	2018	2. divisjon	17	0	2	0	—		19	0
Bryne	2019	2. divisjon	12	1	0	0	—		12	1
Bryne	Total		34	2	2	0	—		36	2
Sola 2 (loan)	2019	4. divisjon	1	2	—		—		1	2
Sola (loan)	2019	2. divisjon	15	4	1	0	—		16	4
Florø	2020	2. divisjon	13	10	0	0	—		13	10
Lillestrøm (loan)	2020	1. divisjon	3	0	0	0	—		3	0
Lillestrøm 2	2021	3. divisjon	6	10	—		—		6	10
Lillestrøm	2021	Eliteserien	17	1	3	2	—		20	3
Start (loan)	2022	1. divisjon	15	12	1	0	—		16	12
Strømsgodset	2022	Eliteserien	13	3	—		—		13	3
Strømsgodset	2023	Eliteserien	16	6	4	5	—		20	11
Strømsgodset	Total		29	9	4	5	—		33	14
OH Leuven	2023–24	Belgian Pro League	31	3	2	0	—		33	3
Raków Częstochowa (loan)	2024–25	Ekstraklasa	32	14	0	0	—		32	14
Raków Częstochowa	2025–26	Ekstraklasa	32	16	5	5	12 (Note: Appearances in UEFA Conference League)	5	49	26
Raków Częstochowa	Total		64	30	5	5	12	5	81	40
Career total			288	98	18	12	12	5	318	115

== Honours ==
Individual

- Polish Cup top scorer: 2025–26
- Ekstraklasa Player of the Month: March 2025
