= Gothard Kokott =

Polish football manager (1943–2021)

Personal information
- Date of birth: 6 October 1943
- Place of birth: Pyskowice, Poland
- Date of death: 11 January 2021 (aged 77)
- Place of death: Częstochowa, Poland
- Position: Goalkeeper

Youth career
- Czarni Pyskowice

Senior career*
Years	Team	Apps	(Gls)
- Czarni Pyskowice
- Piast Gliwice
- Oleśniczanka Oleśnica
1968–1975	Raków Częstochowa	149	(0)

Managerial career
- 1985–1986: Raków Częstochowa
- 1995–1997: Raków Częstochowa
- 1997: Zawisza Bydgoszcz
- 1997–1998: Raków Częstochowa
- 1999: Ruch Radzionków
- 2000–2002: Błękitni Kościelec
- 2000–2003: Clearex Chorzów (futsal)
- 2002–2005: Stradom Częstochowa
- 2005–2006: Clearex Chorzów (futsal)
Medal record
- * Club domestic league appearances and goals

Gothard Kokott (6 October 1943 – 11 January 2021) was a Polish professional football player and manager.

== Career ==
Kokott was born in Pyskowice. As a manager his historic successes in the top flight with both Raków Częstochowa and Ruch Radzionków made him a club legend at both clubs.

Overall, he coached Raków in 94 top division appearances and Ruch in 15. Later, he coached professional futsal club Clearex Chorzów and became a sporting director at Raków.

He received numerous honours and awards for his feats, most notably the Brązowy Krzyż Zasługi, Złota Odznaka PZPN and Srebrna Odznaka PZPN.

He died aged 77 in January 2021, and his funeral was held in Częstochowa where his final resting place is.
