= Kacper Masiak =

Polish footballer (born 2005)

Personal information
- Full name: Kacper Masiak
- Date of birth: 11 January 2005 (age 21)
- Place of birth: Racibórz, Poland
- Height: 1.75 m (5 ft 9 in)
- Position: Attacking midfielder

Team information
- Current team: Stal Rzeszów
- Number: 11

Youth career
- –2018: Unia Racibórz
- 2018–2021: Zagłębie Lubin

Senior career*
Years	Team	Apps	(Gls)
2021–2024	Zagłębie Lubin II	50	(1)
2022–2024	Zagłębie Lubin	1	(0)
2024–2025	Raków Częstochowa	0	(0)
2024	Raków Częstochowa II	9	(1)
2024–2025	→ GKS Jastrzębie (loan)	23	(1)
2025–	Stal Rzeszów	29	(4)

International career
2019	Poland U15	5	(1)
2021	Poland U16	2	(0)
2021–2022	Poland U17	12	(3)
2022–2023	Poland U18	5	(1)
2023	Poland U19	2	(0)
- * Club domestic league appearances and goals as of 17:20, 24 May 2026 (UTC)

Kacper Masiak (born 11 January 2005) is a Polish professional footballer who plays as an attacking midfielder for I liga club Stal Rzeszów.

== Career statistics ==
As of match played 24 May 2026

Appearances and goals by club, season and competition
Club	Season	League			Polish Cup		Continental		Other		Total	
Club	Season	Division	Apps	Goals	Apps	Goals	Apps	Goals	Apps	Goals	Apps	Goals
Zagłębie Lubin II	2021–22	III liga, gr. III	8	0	—		—		—		8	0
Zagłębie Lubin II	2022–23	II liga	23	1	—		—		—		23	1
Zagłębie Lubin II	2023–24	II liga	19	0	0	0	—		—		19	0
Zagłębie Lubin II	Total		50	1	0	0	—		—		50	1
Zagłębie Lubin	2021–22	Ekstraklasa	1	0	0	0	—		—		1	0
Raków Częstochowa	2023–24	Ekstraklasa	0	0	0	0	—		—		0	0
Raków Częstochowa II	2023–24	III liga, gr. III	9	1	—		—		—		9	1
GKS Jastrzębie (loan)	2024–25	II liga	23	1	—		—		—		23	1
Stal Rzeszów	2025–26	I liga	29	4	1	0	—		—		30	4
Career total			112	7	1	0	—		—		113	7

== Honours ==
Zagłębie Lubin II

- III liga, group III: 2021–22
- Polish Cup (Legnica regionals): 2021–22
