= Adriano Amorim =

Brazilian footballer (born 2002)

Personal information
- Full name: Adriano Luís Amorim Santos
- Date of birth: 15 February 2002 (age 24)
- Place of birth: Taguatinga, Federal District, Brazil
- Height: 1.75 m (5 ft 9 in)
- Positions: Striker; winger

Team information
- Current team: Raków Częstochowa

Youth career
- 2019: Osvaldo Cruz
- 2020–2022: Coimbra

Senior career*
Years	Team	Apps	(Gls)
2022–2024	Coimbra	10	(0)
2022	→ Villa Nova (loan)	6	(0)
2022–2024	→ Leixões (loan)	37	(4)
2024–	Raków Częstochowa	57	(2)
- * Club domestic league appearances and goals as of 19:04, 29 May 2026 (UTC)

Adriano Luís Amorim Santos (born 15 February 2002) is a Brazilian professional footballer who plays as a striker or winger for Polish Ekstraklasa club Raków Częstochowa.

Born in the Federal District of Brazil, Amorim had previously played for Brazilian clubs Coimbra and Villa Nova and Portuguese club Leixões.

== Career ==
=== Early career ===
Amorim was born in Taguatinga and grew up largely in Samambaia, both in the Federal District in Brazil. Aged 17, he moved to São Paulo to sign for his first club, Osvaldo Cruz. He later transferred to the youth sector of Coimbra Sports in Minas Gerais in 2020. In January 2022, Amorim, alongside eight other young Coimbra players, joined Villa Nova on loan in the Campeonato Mineiro. He played 6 matches for Villa Nova, and then 10 Campeonato Mineiro Módulo II matches upon his return to Coimbra.

=== Leixões ===
Amorim joined Portuguese club Leixões on loan in August 2022. He spent his the 2022–23 season playing largely with the under-23 side, though he made three first team appearances in the Liga Portugal 2. He returned to Leixões on loan for the 2023–24 season where he established a first-team place, scoring his first senior goal against Paços de Ferreira in September 2023. He scored 4 goals and provided 4 assists in total across the 2023–24 season.

=== Raków Częstochowa ===
On 1 July 2024, it was announced that he had transferred to Ekstraklasa club Raków Częstochowa, and signed a four-year contract with the option of a fifth year. He played 30 matches, scoring once, across the 2024–25 season as Raków Częstochowa finished 2nd in the Ekstraklasa, a point below champions Lech Poznan.

== Style of play ==
Amorim plays as a striker or winger, and upon signing for Leixões in 2022, described himself as "a quick winger with good technical ability" ("um extremo rápido e com boa capacidade técnica") (in Portuguese).
