= Tomasz Pieńko =

Polish footballer

Personal information
- Full name: Tomasz Pieńko
- Date of birth: 5 January 2004 (age 22)
- Place of birth: Wrocław, Poland
- Height: 1.85 m (6 ft 1 in)
- Position: Attacking midfielder

Team information
- Current team: Raków Częstochowa
- Number: 21

Youth career
- –2015: Amico Lubin
- 2015–2020: Zagłębie Lubin

Senior career*
Years	Team	Apps	(Gls)
2020–2022	Zagłębie Lubin II	29	(8)
2021–2025	Zagłębie Lubin	107	(11)
2025–	Raków Częstochowa	38	(3)

International career^{‡}
2018–2019	Poland U15	6	(1)
2019–2020	Poland U16	6	(0)
2022	Poland U18	2	(2)
2022–2023	Poland U19	12	(4)
2023	Poland U20	2	(2)
2022–	Poland U21	27	(8)
- * Club domestic league appearances and goals as of 14:53, 10 November 2026 (UTC) ‡ National team caps and goals as of 21:27, 19 November 2026 (UTC)

Tomasz Pieńko (born 5 January 2004) is a Polish professional footballer who plays as an attacking midfielder for Ekstraklasa club Raków Częstochowa.

== Career statistics ==
As of match played 8 November 2026

Appearances and goals by club, season and competition
Club	Season	League			Polish Cup		Europe		Other		Total	
Club	Season	Division	Apps	Goals	Apps	Goals	Apps	Goals	Apps	Goals	Apps	Goals
Zagłębie Lubin II	2020–21	III liga, gr. III	14	3	—		—		—		14	3
Zagłębie Lubin II	2021–22	III liga, gr. III	12	5	—		—		—		12	5
Zagłębie Lubin II	2022–23	II liga	3	0	—		—		—		3	0
Zagłębie Lubin II	Total		29	8	—		—		—		29	8
Zagłębie Lubin	2021–22	Ekstraklasa	13	1	1	0	—		—		14	1
Zagłębie Lubin	2022–23	Ekstraklasa	31	3	1	0	—		—		32	3
Zagłębie Lubin	2023–24	Ekstraklasa	32	0	1	0	—		—		33	0
Zagłębie Lubin	2024–25	Ekstraklasa	30	7	2	1	—		—		32	8
Zagłębie Lubin	2025–26	Ekstraklasa	1	0	—		—		—		1	0
Zagłębie Lubin	Total		107	11	5	1	—		—		112	12
Raków Częstochowa	2025–26	Ekstraklasa	26	2	3	0	11 (Note: Appearances in UEFA Conference League)	2	—		40	4
Raków Częstochowa	2026–27	Ekstraklasa	12	1	1	0	4	1	—		17	2
Raków Częstochowa	Total		38	3	4	0	15	3	—		57	6
Career total			174	22	9	1	15	3	0	0	198	26

== Honours ==
Zagłębie Lubin II

- III liga, group III: 2021–22
- Polish Cup (Legnica regionals): 2020–21

Individual

- Ekstraklasa Young Player of the Month: April 2025
