= Bogdan Mirčetić =

Serbian footballer

Personal information
- Full name: Bogdan Mirčetić
- Date of birth: 25 October 2005 (age 21)
- Place of birth: Zrenjanin, Serbia and Montenegro
- Height: 1.84 m (6 ft 0 in)
- Positions: Attacking midfielder; right winger

Team information
- Current team: Raków Częstochowa
- Number: 44

Youth career
- 2019–2024: Partizan

Senior career*
Years	Team	Apps	(Gls)
2023–2024	Partizan	0	(0)
2024–2025	Radnički 1923	38	(7)
2025–	Raków Częstochowa	6	(1)
2026–	Raków Częstochowa II	2	(0)

International career^{‡}
2023	Serbia U18	1	(0)
2023–2024	Serbia U19	6	(0)
2024–	Serbia U21	4	(0)
- * Club domestic league appearances and goals as of 21:23, 4 November 2026 (UTC) ‡ National team caps and goals as of 08:11, 9 September 2025 (UTC)

Bogdan Mirčetić (Serbian Cyrillic: Богдан Мирчетић; born 25 October 2005) is a Serbian professional footballer who plays as an attacking midfielder or right winger for Ekstraklasa club Raków Częstochowa.

== Club career ==
Born in Zrenjanin, Mirčetić is a product of Partizan's youth school. In 2024, he signed a contract with Radnički 1923. On 19 July, in a match against Železničar Pančevo, he made his debut in the Serbian SuperLiga. On 4 August, Mirčetić scored his first goal for Radnički 1923 in a match against Radnički Niš.

On 2 September 2025, Mirčetić joined Polish Ekstraklasa club Raków Częstochowa on a five-year deal for an undisclosed fee.

== International career ==
He played for the Serbian national teams at U18, U19 and U21 levels.
