= Marko Perović (footballer, born 2006) =

Montenegrin footballer

Personal information
- Full name: Marko Perović
- Date of birth: 5 March 2006 (age 20)
- Place of birth: Podgorica, Serbia and Montenegro
- Height: 1.79 m (5 ft 10 in)
- Positions: Left-back; winger

Team information
- Current team: Raków Częstochowa
- Number: 36

Youth career
- Budućnost

Senior career*
Years	Team	Apps	(Gls)
2022–2024	Budućnost	3	(0)
2024	Jezero	16	(0)
2024–2025	Almería B	14	(3)
2024–2026	Almería	12	(0)
2026	→ Atlético Madrid B (loan)	12	(0)
2026–	Raków Częstochowa	6	(0)
2026–	Raków Częstochowa II	4	(0)

International career^{‡}
2021	Montenegro U15	4	(0)
2021	Montenegro U16	12	(2)
2021–2023	Montenegro U17	27	(5)
2022–2023	Montenegro U18	5	(0)
2023–2025	Montenegro U19	27	(6)
2025–	Montenegro U21	2	(0)
2025–	Montenegro	6	(0)
- * Club domestic league appearances and goals as of 11:08, 5 November 2026 (UTC) ‡ National team caps and goals as of 16:10, 3 October 2026 (UTC)

Marko Perović (Montenegrin Cyrillic: Марко Перовић; born 5 March 2006) is a Montenegrin professional footballer who plays as either a left-back or a winger for Polish club Raków Częstochowa and the Montenegro national team.

== Club career ==
Perović was born in Podgorica, and was a youth product of hometown side FK Budućnost Podgorica. He made his first team debut at the age of 16 on 6 November 2022, coming on as a late substitute for Ariel Lucero in a 2–0 home win over FK Arsenal Tivat.

On 24 January 2024, after featuring rarely, Perović moved to FK Jezero on a one-year contract. On 13 August, he moved abroad and signed a contract with UD Almería, being initially assigned to the reserves in Segunda Federación.

Perović made his first team debut with the Andalusians on 26 November 2024, replacing Arnau Puigmal late into a 4–0 Segunda División home routing of Córdoba CF. The following 30 July, he renewed his link with the club until 2029.

On 28 January 2026, Perović was loaned to Primera Federación side Atlético Madrid B until June. Upon returning, he signed a four-year contract with Ekstraklasa side Raków Częstochowa on 5 August.

== Career statistics ==
=== International ===
As of match played 2 October 2026

Appearances and goals by national team and year
National team	Year	Apps	Goals
Montenegro
Montenegro	2025	4	0
Montenegro	2026	2	0
Total		6	0
