= Jesús Díaz (footballer, born 1999) =

Colombian footballer (born 1999)

Personal information
- Full name: Jesús Antonio Díaz Gómez
- Date of birth: 21 May 1999 (age 27)
- Place of birth: Montería, Colombia
- Height: 1.83 m (6 ft 0 in)
- Position: Winger

Team information
- Current team: Cúcuta Deportivo (on loan from Raków Częstochowa)

Senior career*
Years	Team	Apps	(Gls)
2019	Tigres	8	(1)
2021–2022	Atlético El Vigía		
2022–2023	Cosmos Nowotaniec	41	(12)
2023–2025	Stal Rzeszów	35	(7)
2024–2025	→ Raków Częstochowa (loan)	24	(1)
2025–	Raków Częstochowa	3	(0)
2025–2026	→ Zagłębie Lubin (loan)	11	(1)
2026–	→ Cúcuta Deportivo (loan)	0	(0)
- * Club domestic league appearances and goals as of 17:38, 29 May 2026 (UTC)

Jesús Antonio Díaz Gómez (born 21 May 1999) is a Colombian professional footballer who plays as a winger for Liga DIMAYOR club Cúcuta Deportivo, on loan from Raków Częstochowa.

== Early life ==
Díaz was born on 21 May 1999 in Montería, Colombia. A native of the city, he has two brothers.

== Career ==
Díaz started his career with Colombian side Tigres in 2019, where he made eight league appearances and scored one goal. Two years later, he signed for Venezuelan side Atlético El Vigía. Following his stint there, he signed for Polish side Cosmos Nowotaniec in 2022, helping the club achieve two consecutive promotions from the sixth tier to fourth tier.

Ahead of the 2023–24 season, Díaz signed for I liga club Stal Rzeszów, where he made thirty-five league appearances and scored seven goals. Polish news website wrote in 2024 that he "was the third-best dribbler in the first division, averaging over eight dribbles per game. He also won over 52 percent of his offensive duels, recording over 20 such duels per game, a very rare feat" while playing for the club.

On 6 September 2024, Díaz extended his deal with Stal until June 2027 and was sent on loan to the Polish top tier side Raków Częstochowa. On 16 June 2025, he joined Raków on a permanent basis, signing a four-year deal.

On 8 September 2025, Díaz was sent on loan to another Ekstraklasa club Zagłębie Lubin for the rest of the season. On 10 August 2026, he returned to Colombia to join Cúcuta Deportivo on a one-year loan deal.

== Honours ==
Cosmos Nowotaniec

- IV liga Subcarpathia: 2022–23
- Regional league Krosno: 2021–22
- Polish Cup (Krosno regionals): 2022–23
