= Patryk Makuch =

Polish footballer (born 1999)

Personal information
- Date of birth: 11 April 1999 (age 27)
- Place of birth: Łódź, Poland
- Height: 1.87 m (6 ft 2 in)
- Positions: Forward; attacking midfielder

Team information
- Current team: Raków Częstochowa
- Number: 9

Youth career
- –2018: UKS SMS Łódź

Senior career*
Years	Team	Apps	(Gls)
2018–2019	Miedź Legnica II	20	(7)
2019–2022	Miedź Legnica	81	(18)
2020	→ GKS Bełchatów (loan)	16	(3)
2022–2024	Cracovia	66	(10)
2024–	Raków Częstochowa	71	(16)
- * Club domestic league appearances and goals as of 18:42, 22 November 2026 (UTC)

Patryk Makuch (born 11 April 1999) is a Polish professional footballer who plays as a forward or attacking midfielder for Ekstraklasa club Raków Częstochowa.

== Career ==
Makuch started his career in the youth academy of UKS SMS Łódź before joining Miedź Legnica's reserve side in 2018. He made three substitute appearances in the Ekstraklasa in the 2018–19 season. On 27 August 2020, he joined GKS Bełchatów on a season-long loan. He returned to Miedz Legnica in the winter transfer window after he was recalled from his loan early.

In May 2022, it was announced that Makuch had joined Cracovia on a four-year contract, for a reported fee of €500,000.

On 12 July 2024, Makuch joined Raków Częstochowa on a four-year contract with an option for a further year.

== Style of play ==
Makuch plays as a striker. He has been noted for his strength and for pressuring opposition defenders.

== Honours ==
Individual

- I liga Player of the Month: May 2022
