= Miejski Stadion Piłkarski Raków =

Football stadium in Częstochowa, Poland

Coordinates: 50°46′36″N 19°09′33″E

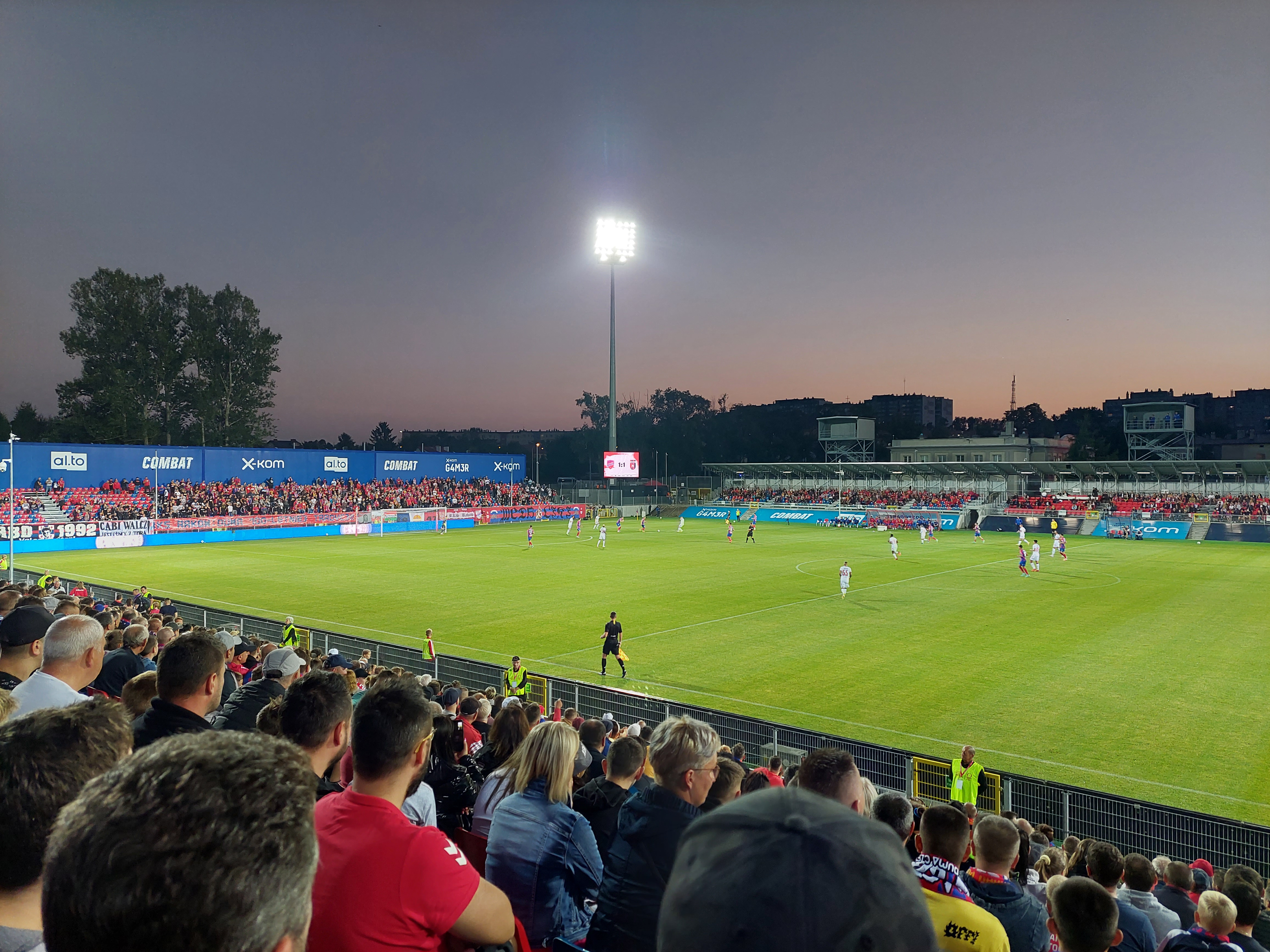
- Stadium in 2021
- Interactive map of Miejski Stadion Piłkarski Raków
- Former names: zondacrypto Arena (2025−2026)
- Location: 83 Bolesław Limanowski Street, Częstochowa, Poland
- Owner: City of Częstochowa
- Operator: Miejski Ośrodek Sportu i Rekreacji w Częstochowie
- Capacity: 5,500
- Surface: Grass

Construction
- Built: 1951–1955
- Opened: 22 July 1955
- Renovated: 2020–21

Tenant
- Raków Częstochowa

The Miejski Stadion Piłkarski Raków (English: Raków Municipal Stadium), is a football stadium in Częstochowa, Poland. The venue is located at the 83 Bolesław Limanowski Street in the Raków district. It is the home ground of the Raków Częstochowa football club.

== History ==
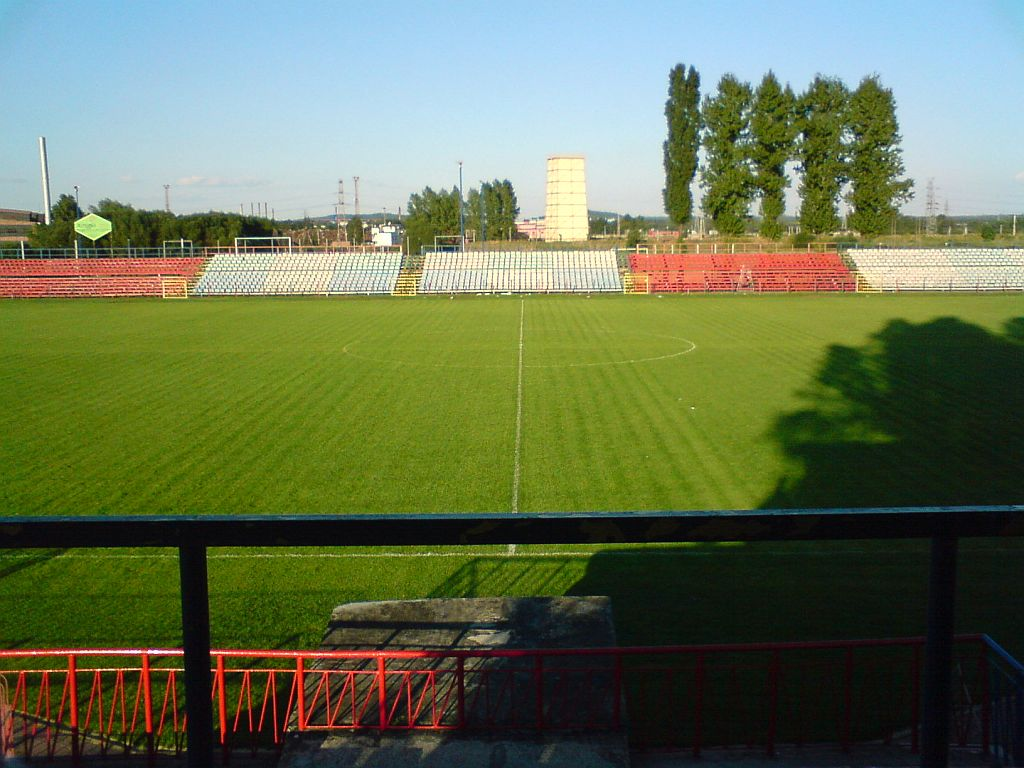
Stadium in 2008

The Social Committee for Stadium Construction was established in 1951 on the initiative of Eng. Marian Zdunkiewicz. The facility was opened on 22 July 1955. In addition to the football field, a running track and an athletics hill were built. The capacity of the facility was approximately 8,000 people. The owner of the stadium was Huta Częstochowa. After 1985, an announcer's tower and a training ground were built to the east of the stadium. In 2003, the steelworks handed it over to the city.

After the promotion of the Raków team to the I liga in the 2016–17 season, the stadium was adapted to league requirements by roofing 588 seats, repairing damaged stands, replacing the seats, as well as installing artificial lighting of the field. In addition, training pitches with back-up facilities were created. In February 2019, the capacity was increased to 4,200 seats.

Along with the promotion of Raków to Ekstraklasa in the 2018–19 season, it was necessary to modernize the stadium in order to adapt it to the licensing requirements. In the years 2020–21, the stands with 5,500 seats were built, the turf heating system was installed and the facilities were rebuilt. The value of the investment is over PLN 17 million.

=== Naming rights ===
On 9 May 2025, the stadium naming rights were acquired by Zondacrypto, a cryptocurrency exchange and Raków's strategic partner, changing the venue's official name to zondacrypto Arena until the end of the 2027–28 season. In April 2026, the deal was terminated due to Zondacrypto's problems with financial fluidity.

== Major matches ==
=== 1978 UEFA European Under-18 Championship ===
5 May	Soviet Union	4–0	Greece
	Netherlands	1–0	Norway
7 May	Netherlands	2–2	Greece
9 May	Soviet Union	2–0	Netherlands
	Norway	2–1	Greece

=== Polish Cup ===
On 10 April 2019, a match of the Polish Cup semi-finals was played at the stadium, in which Raków Częstochowa lost 0–1 to Lechia Gdańsk. The meeting was watched by 4,820 people.

10 April 2019
18:00 CEST (UTC+2)

Raków Częstochowa	0–1	Lechia Gdańsk
	Report	Sobiech 17'

Attendance: 4,820
Referee: Szymon Marciniak (Płock)

On 6 April 2022, a match of the Polish Cup semi-finals was played at the stadium, in which Raków Częstochowa win 1–0 to Legia Warsaw. The meeting was watched by 5,500 people.

6 April 2022
18:00 CEST (UTC+2)

Raków Częstochowa	1–0	Legia Warsaw
Wdowiak 5'	Report

Attendance: 5,500
Referee: Tomasz Musiał (Kraków)
