= Raków Częstochowa =

Polish association football club

- Full name: Robotniczy Klub Sportowy Raków Częstochowa Spółka Akcyjna
- Nickname: Medaliki (Medallions)
- Founded: 15 March 1921; 105 years ago (as Racovia)
- Ground: Miejski Stadion Piłkarski Raków
- Capacity: 5,500
- Owner: Michał Świerczewski
- Chairman: Wojciech Cygan
- Manager: Dawid Szwarga
- League: Ekstraklasa
- 2025–26: Ekstraklasa, 4th of 18
- Website: rakow.com
Home colours	Away colours	Third colours

Robotniczy Klub Sportowy Raków Częstochowa Spółka Akcyjna (commonly referred to as Raków Częstochowa, or simply Raków) is a Polish professional football club, based in Częstochowa, that competes in the Ekstraklasa, the top tier of national football league system.

== History ==
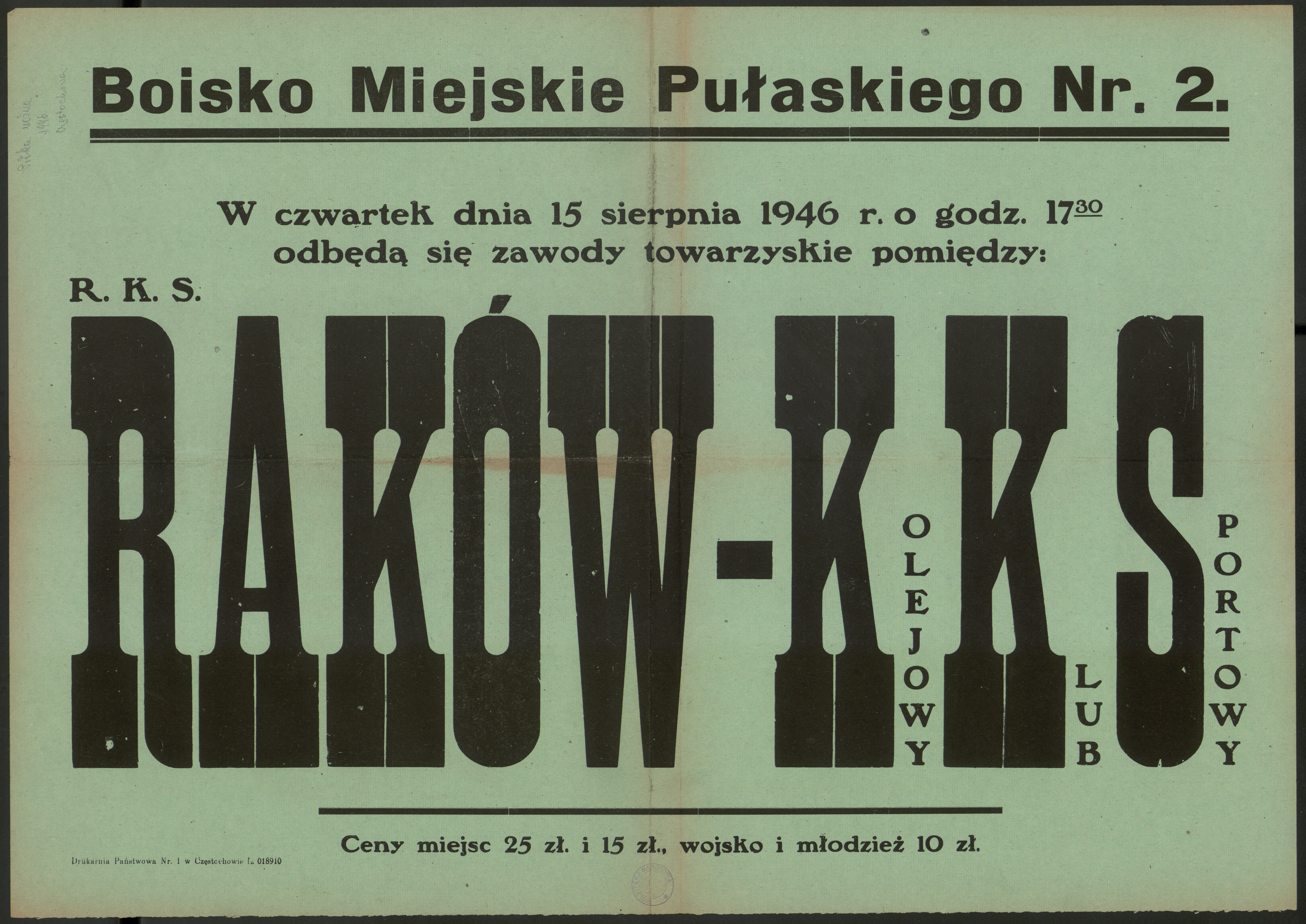
Poster advertising a friendly match between Raków Częstochowa and KKS Częstochowa, 1946

Sports club "Racovia" was established in 1921 in the village of Raków. The club dissolved in 1925 due to lack of registration. In 1927, the club was reactivated under the name of the Robotniczy Klub Sportowy (Workers Sports Club) Raków. A year later, the village became a district of Częstochowa. The club operated under the patronage of the Polish Socialist Party and was financially supported by the Częstochowa steelworks. In 1937, the club was promoted to Klasa A (third level). During the German occupation (World War II), the club did not function. In the years 1951–1955, a Raków Municipal Stadium with an athletics track was built. In the years 1962–1966, the football team competed in the second league.

On 9 July 1967, Raków lost 0–2 to Wisła Kraków in their first Polish Cup final appearance. In 1972, Raków's players reached the semi-finals of the Polish Cup, which they lost to Legia Warsaw. In the years 1978–1980, 1981–1984 and 1990–1994 the club played in the second league. In 1993, the junior team took 2nd place in the Football Junior Championships of Poland. In 1994, for the first time in club history, Raków were promoted to Ekstraklasa. They competed in the top-flight for four seasons until being relegated after the 1997–98 season. The club suffered back-to-back relegations in 1999–2000 and 2000–01, dropping down to the IV liga. The club finally made it to back to the Polish second division, I liga, in 2016.

=== Promotion and European football ===
The club won the I liga in 2018–19, earning promotion to Ekstraklasa for the first time in 21 years. In the same season, they impressed in the 2018–19 Polish Cup, reaching the semi-finals of the competition by beating the likes of Lech Poznań in the round of 32 and Legia Warsaw in the quarter-finals. They finished the 2019–20 season in 10th place.

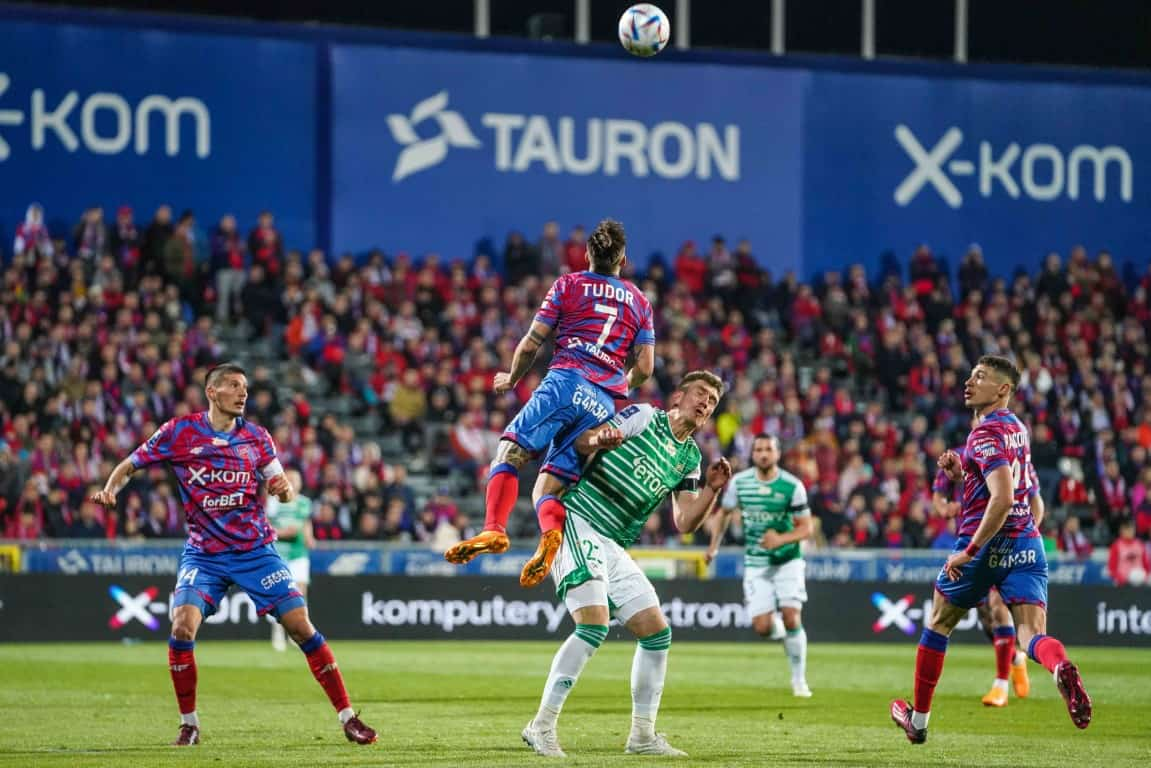
Match between Raków and Lechia Gdańsk

In the 2020–21 season, Raków finished the league season as runners-up. This was their highest ever league position in their history, and it secured their place in the newly formed UEFA Europa Conference League qualifiers for the 2021–22 season, their maiden appearance in European football. Further success followed when Raków won the 2020–21 Polish Cup, their first major trophy, defeating I liga side Arka Gdynia in the final 2–1 on 2 May 2021. On 17 July 2021, Raków Częstochowa defeated reigning Ekstraklasa title holders Legia Warsaw on penalties to win the 2021 Polish Super Cup.

Their first ever appearance in European football was in the second qualifying round of the 2021–22 UEFA Europa Conference League, facing Lithuanian team Sūduva, with the game finishing 0–0 (4–3 pens) after both legs. They faced Russian Premier League side Rubin Kazan in the third qualifying round, beating them 1–0 on aggregate score. In the final qualifying round, they faced Belgian side Gent, which they beat 1–0 in the first leg, but lost 0–3 in the second leg, losing 1–3 on aggregate, eliminating them from the competition.

On 2 May 2022, Raków defeated Lech Poznań 3–1 and secured its second consecutive Polish Cup. In the race for the league title that season, Raków lost out to the same opponents by just five points, with the champions being decided on the penultimate day of the season. On 9 July 2022, Raków won their second consecutive Polish Super Cup with a 2–0 win over Lech Poznań. In the UEFA Europa Conference League qualifying phase, the team defeated Astana (6–0 agg.) and Spartak Trnava (3–0 agg.), but lost to Slavia Prague (2–3 agg.) in the play-off round.

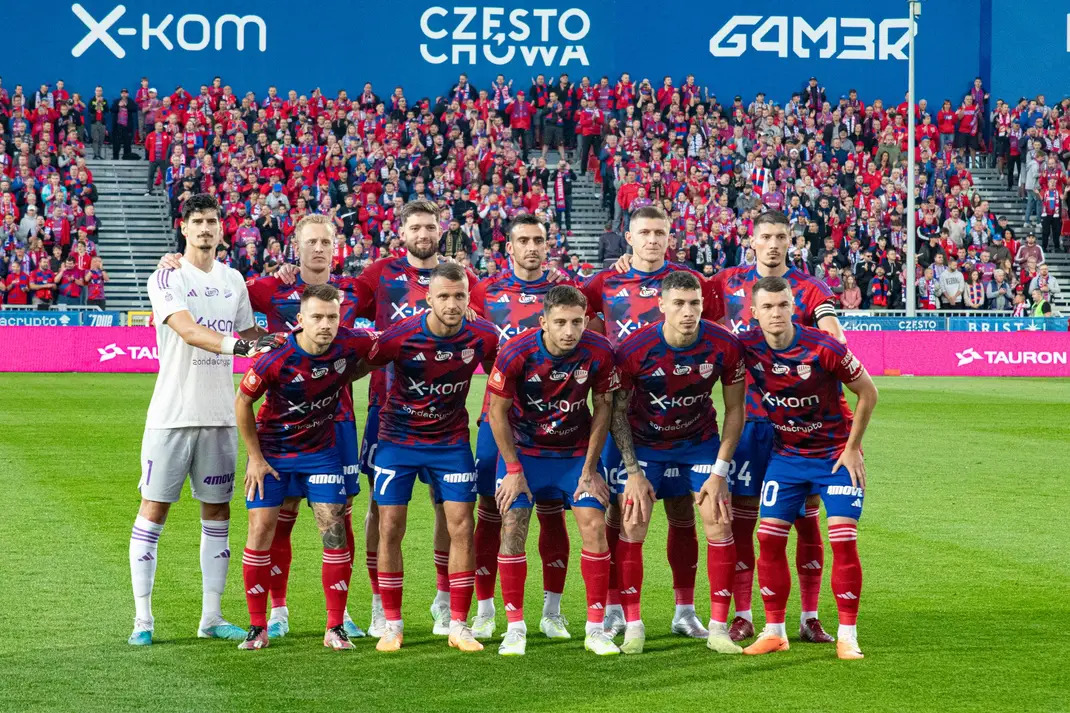
Raków Częstochowa players before match vs Aris Limassol in 2023

On 7 May 2023, Raków won the Ekstraklasa championship for the first time in their history, and thus qualified for the Champions League, where they reached the qualifying play-off round, losing to Copenhagen from Denmark. Raków subsequently played in the Europa League that season, where they were knocked out in the group stages.

In the 2023–24 season, Raków failed to defend their league title, finishing in 7th, as well as being knocked out of the Polish Cup quarter-finals. The following season, however, would see them return to form, resulting in another 2nd place finish, their third top-two finish in five years, finishing a point behind champions Lech Poznań once again.

In 2025, Raków made their second European appearance in the 2025–26 UEFA Conference League, defeating Zilina, Maccabi Haifa and Arda Kardzhali in the qualifying rounds to reach the league phase. Subsequently, they achieved a impressive 2nd place finish, qualifying them directly for the knockout rounds of a European competition for the first time ever. They would bow out to Fiorentina in the round of 16. Domestically, they reached another Polish Cup final, where they would lose to Górnik Zabrze, and finished 4th in the Ekstraklasa.

== Honours ==
=== League ===
- Ekstraklasa
  - Winners: 2022–23
  - Runners-up: 2020–21, 2021–22, 2024–25
- I liga (second division)
  - Winners: 1993–94, 2018–19
- II liga (third division)
  - Winners: 1962, 1977–78, 1980–81, 1989–90, 2016–17
- III liga (fourth division)
  - Winners: 1936–37, 1956, 2004–05

=== Cups ===
- Polish Cup
  - Winners: 2020–21, 2021–22
  - Runners-up: 1966–67, 2022–23, 2025–26
- Polish Super Cup
  - Winners: 2021, 2022
  - Runners-up: 2023

== Raków Częstochowa in European football ==
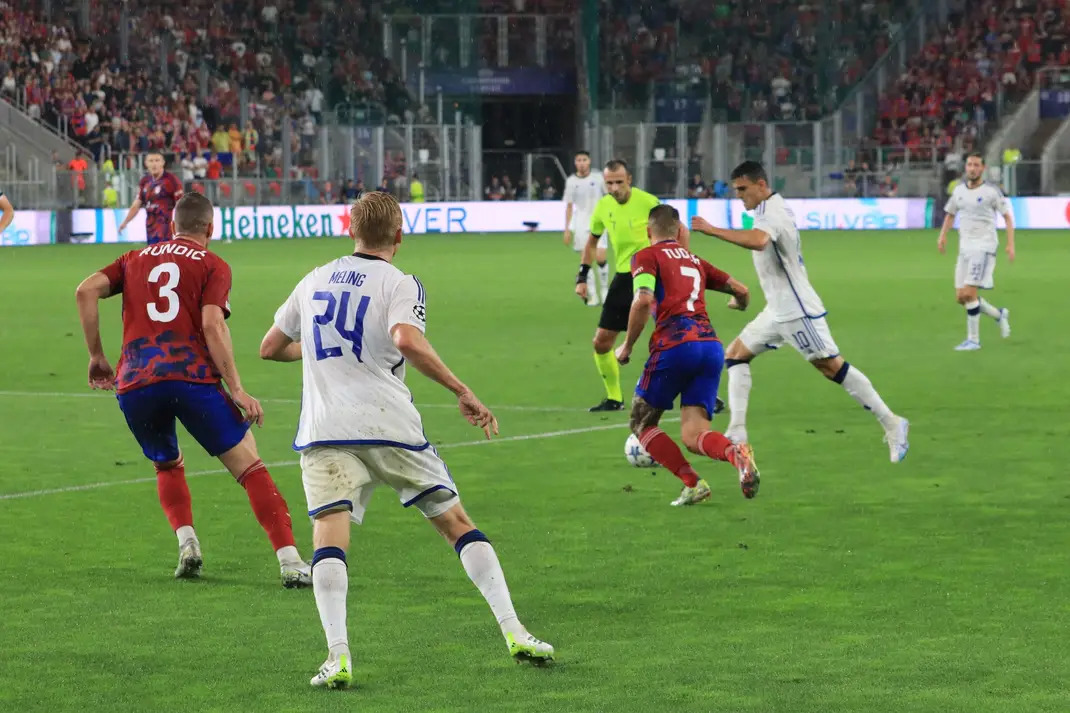
Home game with F.C. Copenhagen in the 2023–24 UEFA Champions League play-off round

As of match played on 27 August 2026

Competition	Games	Wins	Draws	Losses	GS	GA	GD
UEFA Champions League	8	5	2	1	12	6	+6
UEFA Europa League	6	1	1	4	3	10	–7
UEFA Conference League	32	18	8	6	48	21	+27
Total	46	24	11	11	63	37	+26

=== Results ===
Season	Competition	Round	Opponent	Home	Away	Aggregate
2021–22	UEFA Europa Conference League	2Q	(Lithuania) Sūduva	0–0 (a.e.t.)	0–0	0–0 (4–3 p)
2021–22	UEFA Europa Conference League	3Q	(Russia) Rubin Kazan	0–0	1–0 (a.e.t.)	1–0
2021–22	UEFA Europa Conference League	PO	(Belgium) Gent	1–0	0–3	1–3
2022–23	UEFA Europa Conference League	2Q	(Kazakhstan) Astana	5–0	1–0	6–0
2022–23	UEFA Europa Conference League	3Q	(Slovakia) Spartak Trnava	1–0	2–0	3–0
2022–23	UEFA Europa Conference League	PO	(Czech Republic) Slavia Prague	2–1	0–2 (a.e.t.)	2–3
2023–24	UEFA Champions League	1Q	(Estonia) Flora	1–0	3–0	4–0
2023–24	UEFA Champions League	2Q	(Azerbaijan) Qarabağ	3–2	1–1	4–3
2023–24	UEFA Champions League	3Q	(Cyprus) Aris Limassol	2–1	1–0	3–1
2023–24	UEFA Champions League	PO	(Denmark) Copenhagen	0–1	1–1	1–2
2023–24	UEFA Europa League	GS	(Italy) Atalanta	0–4	0–2	4th
2023–24	UEFA Europa League	GS	(Portugal) Sporting CP	1–1	1–2	4th
2023–24	UEFA Europa League	GS	(Austria) Sturm Graz	0–1	1–0	4th
2025–26	UEFA Conference League	2Q	(Slovakia) Žilina	3–0	3–1	6–1
2025–26	UEFA Conference League	3Q	(Israel) Maccabi Haifa	0–1	2–0	2–1
2025–26	UEFA Conference League	PO	(Bulgaria) Arda	1–0	2–1	3–1
2025–26	UEFA Conference League	LP	(Romania) Universitatea Craiova	2–0	—N/a	2nd
2025–26	UEFA Conference League	LP	(Czech Republic) Sigma Olomouc	—N/a	1–1	2nd
2025–26	UEFA Conference League	LP	(Czech Republic) Sparta Prague	—N/a	0–0	2nd
2025–26	UEFA Conference League	LP	(Austria) Rapid Wien	4–1	—N/a	2nd
2025–26	UEFA Conference League	LP	(Bosnia and Herzegovina) Zrinjski Mostar	1–0	—N/a	2nd
2025–26	UEFA Conference League	LP	(Cyprus) Omonia	—N/a	1–0	2nd
2025–26	UEFA Conference League	1/8	(Italy) Fiorentina	1–2	1–2	2–4
2026–27	UEFA Conference League	2Q	(Malta) Valletta	3–1	4–0	7–1
2026–27	UEFA Conference League	3Q	(Sweden) Hammarby	0–0	1–0	1–0
2026–27	UEFA Conference League	PO	(Croatia) Hajduk Split	2–3 (a.e.t.)	2–2	4–5

==== UEFA Team ranking ====
As of 27 August 2026

Rank	Team	Points
83	(Slovenia) Celje	23.000
84	(Switzerland) Basel	22.500
85	(Poland) Raków Częstochowa	22.250
86	(Spain) Rayo Vallecano	22.000
87	(Poland) Jagiellonia Białystok	22.000

== Players ==
=== Current squad ===
As of 8 September 2026

Note: Flags indicate national team as defined under FIFA eligibility rules; some limited exceptions apply. Players may hold more than one non-FIFA nationality.

No.	Pos.	Nation	Player
1	GK	POL	Kacper Trelowski
2	DF	POL	Jerzy Napieraj
3	DF	SWE	Arvid Brorsson
4	DF	GRE	Stratos Svarnas (vice-captain)
5	MF	CRO	Marko Bulat
6	MF	POL	Oskar Repka
7	MF	CRO	Fran Tudor (captain)
9	FW	POL	Patryk Makuch
10	MF	UKR	Vladyslav Kocherhin
11	FW	AZE	Mahir Emreli (on loan from Kaiserslautern)
15	MF	POL	Oliwier Kwiatkowski
17	MF	POL	Jakub Jendryka
19	DF	SWE	Nils Zätterström (on loan from Sheffield United)
20	MF	BRA	Jean Carlos
21	MF	POL	Tomasz Pieńko
22	MF	NGR	Abraham Ojo

No.	Pos.	Nation	Player
23	MF	POL	Karol Struski
24	DF	POL	Nikodem Całko
25	DF	ROU	Bogdan Racovițan
26	MF	KEN	Erick Otieno
29	GK	POL	Wiktor Żołneczko
36	MF	MNE	Marko Perović
39	FW	SWE	Isak Brusberg
44	MF	SRB	Bogdan Mirčetić
48	GK	POL	Karol Surzyn
71	GK	BIH	Tarik Karić
77	DF	UGA	Dieudonné Debohi
80	MF	GUI	Lamine Diaby-Fadiga
88	MF	HUN	Ádin Molnár
99	FW	POL	Adam Basse
—	MF	BRA	Adriano Amorim

=== Out on loan ===
Note: Flags indicate national team as defined under FIFA eligibility rules; some limited exceptions apply. Players may hold more than one non-FIFA nationality.

No.	Pos.	Nation	Player
30	MF	COL	Jesús Díaz (at Cúcuta Deportivo until 30 June 2027)
31	GK	POL	Dominik Czeremski (at Stal Brzeg until 30 June 2027)
76	GK	POL	Jakub Rajczykowski (at Świt Szczecin until 30 June 2027)
97	MF	SEN	Ibrahima Seck (at Sūduva until 30 November 2026)

No.	Pos.	Nation	Player
—	MF	POL	Antoni Burkiewicz (at Unia Skierniewice until 30 June 2027)
—	MF	POL	Kacper Nowakowski (at ŁKS Łódź until 30 June 2027)
—	GK	BIH	Muhamed Šahinović (at Radnički 1923 until 30 June 2027)

=== Retired numbers ===
Note: Flags indicate national team as defined under FIFA eligibility rules; some limited exceptions apply. Players may hold more than one non-FIFA nationality.

No.	Pos.	Nation	Player
13	MF	POL	Piotr Malinowski (2015–21)

=== Notable players ===
Players who have appeared for their respective national team at any time. Players whose name is listed in bold represented their countries while playing for Raków.

Poland

- (Poland) **Michael Ameyaw**
- (Poland) Paweł Dawidowicz
- (Poland) Adam Fedoruk
- (Poland) Michał Gliwa
- (Poland) Jarosław Jach
- (Poland) Tomasz Kiełbowicz
- (Poland) Jacek Krzynówek
- (Poland) Hubert Pala
- (Poland) **Kamil Piątkowski**
- (Poland) Michał Skóraś
- (Poland) **Paweł Skrzypek**
- (Poland) Karol Struski
- (Poland) Maciej Wilusz
- (Poland) Mateusz Zachara

Europe

Armenia

- (Armenia) Aghvan Papikyan

Azerbaijan

- (Azerbaijan) **Mahir Emreli**

Belarus

- (Belarus) Artsyom Rakhmanaw

Bosnia and Herzegovina

- (Bosnia and Herzegovina) **Adnan Kovačević**

Croatia

- (Croatia) Fran Tudor

Czech Republic

- (Czech Republic) **Tomáš Petrášek**

Georgia

- (Georgia (country)) Luka Gagnidze
- (Georgia (country)) **Valerian Gvilia**

Greece

- (Greece) **Giannis Papanikolaou**
- (Greece) Stratos Svarnas

Hungary

- (Hungary) Péter Baráth

Latvia

- (Latvia) **Vladislavs Gutkovskis**

Montenegro

- (Montenegro) **Marko Perović**

Romania

- (Romania) **Bogdan Racovițan**
- (Romania) **Deian Sorescu**

Serbia

- (Serbia) Srđan Plavšić
- (Serbia) Marko Poletanović

Slovakia

- (Slovakia) Dominik Holec
- (Slovakia) Dušan Kuciak

Slovenia

- (Slovenia) Mitja Ilenič
- (Slovenia) **David Tijanić**

Sweden

- (Sweden) Gustav Berggren
- (Sweden) Nils Zätterström

Ukraine

- (Ukraine) Vladyslav Kocherhin

Africa

Guinea

- (Guinea) **Lamine Diaby-Fadiga**

Kenya

- (Kenya) **Erick Otieno**

Uganda

- (Uganda) **Dieudonné Debohi**

Central America

Costa Rica

- (Costa Rica) Felicio Brown Forbes

Trinidad and Tobago

- (Trinidad and Tobago) **Elijah Cordner**

South America

Ecuador

- (Ecuador) **John Yeboah**

== Player records ==
=== Most goals ===
#	Nat.	Name	Goals
1	(Poland)	Zdzisław Sławuta	106
2	(Poland)	Waldemar Żebrowski	98
3	(Poland)	Sławomir Palacz	87
4	(Poland)	Jan Spychalski	77
5	(Poland)	Piotr Malinowski	74
6	(Poland)	Tomasz Czok	71
7	(Poland)	Grzegorz Skwara	69
8	(Spain)	Ivi	62
9	(Poland)	Czesław Kusal	59
10	(Poland)	Mirosław Małolepszy	56

Players whose name is listed in bold are still active.

==== Top goalscorers ====
Season	Name	G
2002–03 IV liga	(Poland) Tomasz Czok	15
2004–05 IV liga	(Poland) Tomasz Czok	23
2021–22 Ekstraklasa	(Spain) Ivi	20

== Coaches and managers ==
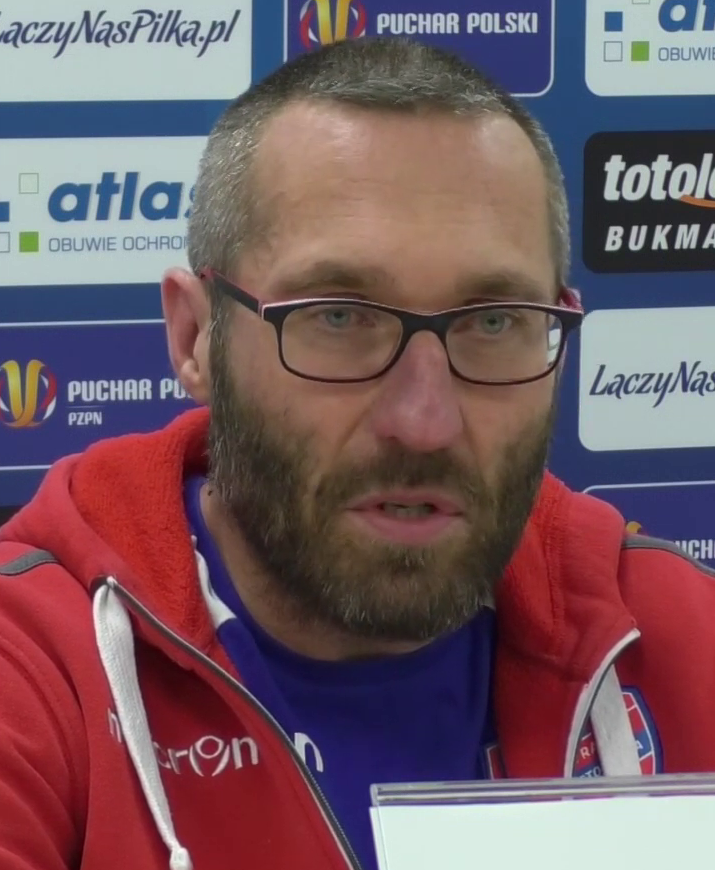
Marek Papszun is Raków's most successful coach.

- (Poland) Franciszek Karmański (??–1959)
- (Poland) Jerzy Orłowski (1959–1960)
- (Poland) Władysław Siech (1962)
- (Poland) Czesław Suszczyk (1962–1964)
- (Poland) Leon Wolny (1964)
- (Poland) Edward Drabiński (1964–1965)
- (Poland) Henryk Bobula (1965–1966)
- (Poland) Jan Basiński (1966)
- (Poland) Jerzy Wrzos (1966–1967)
- (Poland) Jan Basiński (?? –1977)
- (Poland) Janusz Poniedziałek (1977–1979)
- (Poland) Zbigniew Szumski (1979–1980)
- (Poland) Jan Basiński (1980–1984)
- (Poland) Zbigniew Dobosz (1984–1985)
- (Poland) Gothard Kokott (1 July 1985 – 1 January 1986)
- (Poland) Jan Basiński (1990–1991)
- (Poland) Władysław Szarżyński (1991–1992)
- (Poland) Zbigniew Dobosz (1992 – March 1995)
- (Poland) Gothard Kokott (March 1995 – 23 April 1997)
- (Poland) Hubert Kostka (24 April 1997 – 15 September 1997)
- (Poland) Jan Basiński (16 September 1997 – 1 October 1997)
- (Poland) Bogusław Hajdas (2 October 1997 – 3 November 1997)
- (Poland) Adam Zalewski (4 November 1997 – 1 December 1997)
- (Poland) Gothard Kokott (2 December 1997 – 1 July 1998)
- (Poland) Zbigniew Dobosz (1998–2000)
- (Poland) Mirosław Sieja (2000 – July 2000)
- (Poland) Adam Zalewski (July 2000 – 2000)
- (Poland) Henryk Turek (2000–2001)
- (Poland) Zbigniew Dobosz (2002–2003)
- (Poland) Andrzej Samodurow (2003 – 17 October 2005)
- (Poland) Robert Olbiński (17 October 2005 – 20 August 2008)
- (Poland) Henryk Turek (2008 – 20 August 2008)
- (Poland) Leszek Ojrzyński (20 August 2008 – 9 October 2009)
- (Poland) Robert Olbiński (19 October 2009 – 9 February 2010)
- (Poland) Jerzy Brzęczek (9 February 2010 – 4 November 2014)
- (Poland) Dawid Jankowski (6 November 2014 – 18 December 2014)
- (Poland) Radosław Mroczkowski (18 December 2014 – 3 October 2015)
- (Poland) Krzysztof Kołaczyk (4 October 2015 – 9 October 2015)
- (Poland) Przemysław Cecherz (9 October 2015 – 18 April 2016)
- (Poland) Marek Papszun (18 April 2016 – 28 May 2023)
- (Poland) Dawid Szwarga (28 May 2023 – 30 June 2024)
- (Poland) Marek Papszun (1 July 2024 – 19 December 2025)
- (Poland) Łukasz Tomczyk (22 December 2025 – 3 May 2026)
- (Poland) Dawid Kroczek (4 May 2026 – 31 August 2026)
- (Poland) Dawid Szulczek (caretaker) (1 September 2026 – 8 September 2026)
- (Poland) Tomasz Kaczmarek (8 September 2026 – 19 October 2026)
- (Poland) Dawid Szwarga (21 October 2026 – present)
