= 2022–23 Raków Częstochowa season =

Raków Częstochowa
2022–23 season
- Owner: Michał Świerczewski
- Chairman: Adam Krawczak
- Manager: Marek Papszun
- Stadium: Miejski Stadion Piłkarski "Raków"
- Ekstraklasa: 1st
- Polish Cup: Runners-up
- Polish Super Cup: Winners
- UEFA Europa Conference League: Play-off round
- Top goalscorer: League: Ivi; Bartosz Nowak (9 each); All: Ivi (14 goals)
Home colours	Away colours	Third colours

The 2022–23 season was Raków Częstochowa's 101st season in existence and the club's fourth consecutive season in the top flight of Polish football. In addition to the domestic league, Raków Częstochowa participated in this season's edition of the Polish Cup, the Polish Super Cup, and the UEFA Europa Conference League. The season covered the period from 1 July 2022 to 30 June 2023.

== Players ==
=== First-team squad ===
As of 15 January 2023

Note: Flags indicate national team as defined under FIFA eligibility rules; some limited exceptions apply. Players may hold more than one non-FIFA nationality.

No.	Pos.	Nation	Player
1	GK	BIH	Vladan Kovačević
2	DF	CZE	Tomáš Petrášek
3	DF	SRB	Milan Rundić
4	DF	GRE	Stratos Svarnas (on loan from AEK Athens)
5	MF	SWE	Gustav Berggren
6	DF	POL	Andrzej Niewulis
7	MF	CRO	Fran Tudor
8	MF	POL	Ben Lederman
9	FW	POL	Sebastian Musiolik
11	MF	ESP	Ivi
12	GK	POL	Kacper Trelowski
14	MF	POL	Daniel Szelągowski
17	MF	POL	Mateusz Wdowiak
18	DF	POL	Adrian Gryszkiewicz

No.	Pos.	Nation	Player
21	FW	LAT	Vladislavs Gutkovskis
23	MF	POL	Patryk Kun
24	DF	CRO	Zoran Arsenić
25	DF	ROU	Bogdan Racovițan
27	MF	POL	Bartosz Nowak
29	GK	POL	Xavier Dziekoński
30	MF	UKR	Vladyslav Kocherhin
55	MF	POL	Szymon Czyż
66	MF	GRE	Giannis Papanikolaou
71	MF	POL	Wiktor Długosz
76	GK	POL	Jakub Rajczykowski
77	MF	POL	Marcin Cebula
88	MF	GEO	Valerian Gvilia
99	FW	POL	Fabian Piasecki

=== Out on loan ===
Note: Flags indicate national team as defined under FIFA eligibility rules; some limited exceptions apply. Players may hold more than one non-FIFA nationality.

No.	Pos.	Nation	Player
16	DF	POL	Oskar Krzyżak (at Skra Częstochowa until 30 June 2023)
19	DF	AUS	Jordan Courtney-Perkins (at Brisbane Roar until 30 June 2023)
22	MF	ROU	Deian Sorescu (on loan to FCSB until 30 June 2023)

No.	Pos.	Nation	Player
89	FW	POR	Pedro Vieira (at Resovia until 30 June 2023)
—	GK	POL	Jakub Mądrzyk (at Stomil Olsztyn until 30 June 2023)

=== Other players under contract ===
Note: Flags indicate national team as defined under FIFA eligibility rules; some limited exceptions apply. Players may hold more than one non-FIFA nationality.

No.	Pos.	Nation	Player
—	MF	POL	Jakub Bator
—	MF	POL	Piotr Malinowski
—	FW	POL	Przemysław Oziębała

== Pre-season and friendlies ==
Win Draw Loss

22 June 2022 Friendly	Lechia Gdańsk (Poland)	1–2	(Poland) Raków Częstochowa	Ostróda
13:30 CEST		Report		Stadium: Stadion Sokoła Ostróda

26 June 2022 Friendly	Raków Częstochowa (Poland)	5–1	(Poland) Chojniczanka Chojnice	Sochocin
12:30 CEST		Report		Stadium: Hotel BoniFaCio SPA & Sport Resort

1 July 2022 Friendly	Raków Częstochowa (Poland)	3–0	(Poland) Wisła Płock	Sochocin
11:00 CEST		Report		Stadium: Stadion Sochocin

1 July 2022 Friendly	Wisła Płock (Poland)	3–0	(Poland) Raków Częstochowa	Sochocin
13:15 CEST		Report		Stadium: Stadion Sochocin

23 September 2022 Friendly	Raków Częstochowa (Poland)	6–0	(Poland) Górnik Zabrze	Częstochowa
11:30 CEST		Report		Stadium: Miejski Stadion Piłkarski "Raków"

10 December 2022 Friendly	PSV Eindhoven (Netherlands)	4–2	(Poland) Raków Częstochowa	Eindhoven
12:00 CEST		Report		Stadium: PSV Campus De Herdgang

14 December 2022 Friendly	Anderlecht (Belgium)	1–1	(Poland) Raków Częstochowa	Brussels
13:00 CEST		Report		Stadium: RSCA Football Academy

13 January 2023 Friendly	Raków Częstochowa (Poland)	3–0	(Azerbaijan) Qarabağ	Belek
15:00 CEST		Report		Stadium: Gloria Sports Arena

16 January 2023 Friendly	Raków Częstochowa (Poland)	4–1	(Romania) FCSB	Belek
15:00 CEST		Report		Stadium: Regnum Carya Golf & Spa Resort - Field 1

19 January 2023 Friendly	Raków Częstochowa (Poland)	3–3	(Slovenia) Olimpija	Belek
10:30 CEST		Report		Stadium: Maxx Royal Hotel Field A

20 January 2023 Friendly	Raków Częstochowa (Poland)	3–1	(Ukraine) Dnipro-1	Belek
10:30 CEST		Report		Stadium: Maxx Royal Hotel Field A

== Competitions ==
=== Overview ===
Competition	First match	Last match	Starting round	Final position	Record							
Competition	First match	Last match	Starting round	Final position	Pld	W	D	L	GF	GA	GD	Win %
Ekstraklasa	15 July 2022	27 May 2023	Matchday 1	Winners	34	23	6	5	63	24	+39	67.65
Polish Cup	18 October 2022	2 May 2023	Round of 32	Runners-up	4	3	1	0	6	0	+6	75.00
Polish Super Cup	9 July 2022		Final	Winners	1	1	0	0	2	0	+2	100.00
UEFA Europa Conference League	21 July 2022	25 August 2022	Second qualifying round	Play-off round	6	5	0	1	11	3	+8	83.33
Total					45	32	7	6	82	27	+55	71.11

Source: Soccerway

=== Ekstraklasa ===
==== League table ====
Pos	Team	Pld	W	D	L	GF	GA	GD	Pts	Qualification or relegation
1	Raków Częstochowa (C)	34	23	6	5	63	24	+39	75	Qualification for the Champions League first qualifying round
2	Legia Warsaw	34	19	9	6	57	37	+20	66	Qualification for the Europa Conference League second qualifying round (Note: Since the winner of the 2022–23 Polish Cup qualified for the Europa Conference League based on league position, the third Europa Conference League second qualifying round berth was transferred to the 4th-placed team.)
3	Lech Poznań	34	17	10	7	51	29	+22	61	Qualification for the Europa Conference League second qualifying round
4	Pogoń Szczecin	34	17	9	8	57	46	+11	60	Qualification for the Europa Conference League second qualifying round
5	Piast Gliwice	34	15	8	11	40	31	+9	53	

Source: ekstraklasa.org
Rules for classification: 1) Points; 2) Head-to-head points; 3) Head-to-head goal difference; 4) Goal difference; 5) Goals scored; 6) Number of wins; 7) Number of away wins; 8) Lower number of points based on yellow and red cards (red card = 3 points, yellow card = 1 point, sending-off = 3 points - including 1 point for first yellow card); 9) Fairplay ranking; 10) Draw. (Note: Head-to-head record is used only after all the matches between the teams in question have been played)
(C) Champions

==== Results summary ====
Overall								Home						Away					
Pld	W	D	L	GF	GA	GD	Pts	W	D	L	GF	GA	GD	W	D	L	GF	GA	GD
34	23	6	5	63	24	+39	75	14	2	1	41	10	+31	9	4	4	22	14	+8

Source: PKO Ekstraklasa

==== Results by round ====
Round	1	2	3	4	5	6	7	8	9	10	11	12	13	14	15	16	17	18	19	20	21	22	23	24	25	26	27	28	29	30	31	32	33	34
Ground	H	H	A	H	A	H	A	H	H	A	A	H	A	H	A	H	A	A	H	A	H	A	A	H	H	A	A	H	A	H	A	H	A	H
Result	W	W	L	D	W	W	L	W	W	D	W	W	W	W	W	W	W	D	W	D	W	W	W	W	W	L	D	W	W	W	L	L	W	D
Position	6	3	3	4	5	2	2	4	1	1	1	1	1	1	1	1	1	1	1	1	1	1	1	1	1	1	1	1	1	1	1	1	1	1

Source: PKO Ekstraklasa
A = Away; H = Home; W = Win; D = Draw; L = Loss

==== Matches ====
The league fixtures were announced on 1 June 2022.

July 2022 1	v

=== Polish Cup ===
18 October 2022 Round of 32	Zagłębie Sosnowiec	0–1	Raków Częstochowa	Sosnowiec
14:30 CEST	Jończy (yellow card) 20'; Masłowski (yellow card) 54'	Report	Kun (yellow card) 62'; Nowak (yellow card) 73'; Kocherhin 90+5'	Stadium: Stadion Ludowy; Attendance: 1,521; Referee: Tomasz Kwiatkowski

9 November 2022 Round of 16	Pogoń Szczecin	0–1	Raków Częstochowa	Szczecin
17:30 CEST		Report	Papanikolaou (yellow card) 29'; Ivi 68' (yellow card) 90+3'; Trelowski (yellow card) 89'	Stadium: Stadion Miejski im. Floriana Krygiera; Attendance: 13,006; Referee: Daniel Stefański

1 March 2023 Quarter-finals	Motor Lublin	0–3	Raków Częstochowa	Lublin
20:30 CEST	Kusiński (yellow card) 36'	Report	Musiolik 30'; Gutkovskis (yellow card) 64'; Wdowiak 69'; Tudor 87'; Tudor (yellow card) 88'	Stadium: Arena Lublin; Attendance: 7,644; Referee: Tomasz Kwiatkowski

=== Polish Super Cup ===
9 July 2022 Final	Lech Poznań	0–2	Raków Częstochowa	Poznań
20:10 CEST (UTC+2)		Report	Racovițan 43'; Wdowiak 51'	Stadium: Stadion Poznań; Attendance: 15,898; Referee: Paweł Raczkowski

=== UEFA Europa Conference League ===
==== Second qualifying round ====
21 July 2022 First leg	Raków Częstochowa (Poland)	5–0	(Kazakhstan) Astana	Częstochowa
21:00 CEST	Ivi 4'; Sorescu (yellow card) 11' (yellow-red card) 21'; Racovițan (yellow card) 32'; Wdowiak 41'; Gutkovskis 65'; Kocherhin 76'; Tudor 90+4' (pen.)	Report	Manzorro (yellow card) 12'; Darabayev (yellow card) 29' (yellow-red card) 62'; Talgat Kusyapov (yellow card) 47'; Timur Dosmagambetov (yellow card) 69'; Beskorovaynyi (yellow card) 90+3'	Stadium: Miejski Stadion Piłkarski "Raków"; Attendance: 5,324; Referee: (Georgia (country)) Goga Kikacheishvili

28 July 2022 Second leg	Astana (Kazakhstan)	0–1 (0–6 agg.)	(Poland) Raków Częstochowa	Nur-Sultan
21:00	Gabyshev (yellow card) 45+2'; Ebong (yellow card) 69'	Report	Kocherhin 16'; Arsenić (yellow card) 21'; Musiolik (yellow card) 32'	Stadium: Astana Arena; Attendance: 8,569; Referee: (Czech Republic) Tomas Klima

==== Third qualifying round ====
4 August 2022 First leg	Spartak Trnava (Slovakia)	0–2	(Poland) Raków Częstochowa	Trnava
18:30 CEST	Daniel (yellow card) 35'; Yusuf (yellow card) 38'; Bukata (yellow card) 45'; Mikovič (yellow card) 57'	Report	Ivi 30' 45+1' (pen.); Czyż (yellow card) 81'	Stadium: Anton Malatinský Stadium; Attendance: 8,720; Referee: (Croatia) Igor Pajač

11 August 2022 Second leg	Raków Częstochowa (Poland)	1–0 (3–0 agg.)	(Slovakia) Spartak Trnava	Częstochowa
18:00 CEST	Gutkovskis (yellow card) 65'; Kocherhin 68'	Report	Mikovič (yellow card) 23'; Čurma (yellow card) 41'; Štefánik (yellow card) 47'; Savvidis (yellow card) 83'; Yusuf (yellow card) 90+2'	Stadium: Miejski Stadion Piłkarski "Raków"; Attendance: 5,434; Referee: (Netherlands) Allard Lindhout

==== Play-off round ====
18 August 2022 First leg	Raków Częstochowa (Poland)	2–1	Slavia Prague (Czech Republic)	Częstochowa
18:00 CEST	Ivi 29'; Tudor 61'; Papanikolaou (yellow card) 81'; Wdowiak (yellow card) 90+1'	Report	Lingr (yellow card) 54'; Holeš 60'; Ousou (yellow card) 90+2'	Stadium: Miejski Stadion Piłkarski "Raków"; Attendance: 5,500; Referee: (Norway) Rohit Saggi

25 August 2022 Second leg	Slavia Prague (Czech Republic)	2–0 (a.e.t.) (3–2 agg.)	Raków Częstochowa (Poland)	Prague
19:00 CEST	Ševčík (yellow card) 53'; Usor 62'; Dorley (yellow card) 82'; Provod (yellow card) 93'; Schranz 120+1' (yellow card) 120+2'; Olayinka (yellow card) 12+5'	Report	Rundić (yellow card) 65'; Arsenić (yellow card) 90'; Tudor (yellow card) 98'; Wdowiak (yellow card) 108'; Ivi (yellow card) 117'	Stadium: Fortuna Arena; Attendance: 19,370; Referee: (England) Craig Pawson
