= 2023–24 Raków Częstochowa season =

Raków Częstochowa
2023–24 season
- Chairman: Piotr Obidziński
- Manager: Dawid Szwarga
- Stadium: Miejski Stadion Piłkarski "Raków" (Domestic competitions); Zagłębiowski Park Sportowy (Note: Raków Częstochowa played their UEFA Champions League play-off and UEFA Europa League group stage home matches at the Zagłębiowski Park Sportowy in Sosnowiec, instead of their regular stadium, the Miejski Stadion Piłkarski "Raków", in Częstochowa, which does not meet UEFA requirements.) (European competitions)
- Ekstraklasa: 7th
- Polish Cup: Quarter-finals
- Polish Super Cup: Runners-up
- UEFA Champions League: Play-off round
- UEFA Europa League: Group stage
- Top goalscorer: League: Ante Crnac (8); All: Ante Crnac (8)
Home colours	Away colours

The 2023–24 season was Raków Częstochowa's 103rd season in existence and ninth consecutive in the Polish top division Ekstraklasa. They also competed in the Polish Cup, the Polish Super Cup, the UEFA Champions League and the UEFA Europa League.

== Players ==
=== First-team squad ===
As of 9 September 2023

Note: Flags indicate national team as defined under FIFA eligibility rules; some limited exceptions apply. Players may hold more than one non-FIFA nationality.

No.	Pos.	Nation	Player
1	GK	SRB	Vladan Kovačević
3	DF	SRB	Milan Rundić
4	DF	GRE	Stratos Svarnas
5	MF	SWE	Gustav Berggren
7	MF	CRO	Fran Tudor
8	MF	POL	Ben Lederman
9	FW	POL	Łukasz Zwoliński
10	MF	ESP	Ivi
11	FW	ECU	John Yeboah
12	GK	GRE	Antonis Tsiftsis (on loan from Asteras Tripolis)
14	MF	SRB	Srđan Plavšić
15	DF	BIH	Adnan Kovačević
18	DF	POL	Adrian Gryszkiewicz
19	FW	CRO	Ante Crnac
20	MF	BRA	Jean Carlos

No.	Pos.	Nation	Player
21	MF	POL	Dawid Drachal
22	MF	ROU	Deian Sorescu
24	DF	CRO	Zoran Arsenić (captain)
25	DF	ROU	Bogdan Racovițan
27	MF	POL	Bartosz Nowak
30	MF	UKR	Vladyslav Kocherhin
33	DF	POL	Kamil Pestka
66	MF	GRE	Giannis Papanikolaou
77	MF	POL	Marcin Cebula
89	GK	POL	Kacper Bieszczad (on loan from Zagłębie Lubin)
91	FW	POL	Tomasz Walczak
93	MF	GER	Sonny Kittel
99	FW	POL	Fabian Piasecki

=== Other players under contract ===
Note: Flags indicate national team as defined under FIFA eligibility rules; some limited exceptions apply. Players may hold more than one non-FIFA nationality.

No.	Pos.	Nation	Player
—	MF	POL	Piotr Malinowski
—	MF	POL	Daniel Szelągowski
—	FW	POL	Przemysław Oziębała

=== Out on loan ===
Note: Flags indicate national team as defined under FIFA eligibility rules; some limited exceptions apply. Players may hold more than one non-FIFA nationality.

No.	Pos.	Nation	Player
6	MF	POL	Szymon Czyż (at Górnik Zabrze until 30 June 2024)
16	DF	POL	Oskar Krzyżak (at Warta Poznań until 30 June 2024)
26	GK	POL	Xavier Dziekoński (at Korona Kielce until 30 June 2024)
39	GK	POL	Jakub Mądrzyk (at Miedź Legnica until 30 June 2024)

No.	Pos.	Nation	Player
71	MF	POL	Wiktor Długosz (at Ruch Chorzów until 30 June 2024)
76	GK	POL	Jakub Rajczykowski (at Skra Częstochowa until 30 June 2024)
—	GK	POL	Kacper Trelowski (at Śląsk Wrocław until 30 June 2024)
—	MF	POL	Tobiasz Kubik (at Skra Częstochowa until 30 June 2024)

== Transfers ==
=== In ===
Pos.	Player	Transferred from	Fee	Date	Source
DF	(Greece) Stratos Svarnas	(Greece) AEK Athens	€800,000	1 July 2023	
MF	(Ecuador) John Yeboah	(Poland) Śląsk Wrocław	€1,500,000	6 July 2023	
MF	(Germany) Sonny Kittel	(Germany) Hamburger SV	Free	20 July 2023	
MF	(Serbia) Srđan Plavšić	(Serbia) Red Star Belgrade	€400,000	25 July 2023	
FW	(Croatia) Ante Crnac	(Croatia) Slaven Belupo	€1,300,000	1 September 2023	

=== Out ===
Pos.	Player	Transferred to	Fee	Date	Source
MF	(Poland) Patryk Kun	(Poland) Legia Warsaw	Free	1 July 2023	

== Pre-season and friendlies ==
Win Draw Loss Fixtures

27 June 2023 Friendly	Raków Częstochowa (Poland)	4–0	(Poland) Puszcza Niepolomice
11:30

2 July 2023 Friendly	Slavia Prague (Czech Republic)	2–1	(Poland) Raków Częstochowa
15:30

5 July 2023 Friendly	Raków Częstochowa (Poland)	2–1	(Romania) Universitatea Cluj
11:00

== Competitions ==
=== Overall record ===
Competition	First match	Last match	Starting round	Final position	Record							
Competition	First match	Last match	Starting round	Final position	Pld	W	D	L	GF	GA	GD	Win %
Ekstraklasa	22 July 2023	9 March 2024	Matchday 1		31	13	10	8	51	34	+17	41.94
Polish Cup	2 November 2023	27 February 2024	Round of 32	Quarter-finals	3	2	0	1	3	3	+0	66.67
Polish Super Cup	15 July 2023		Final	Runners-up	1	0	1	0	0	0	+0	0.00
UEFA Champions League	11 July 2023	30 August 2023	Second qualifying round	Play-off round	6	3	2	1	8	6	+2	50.00
UEFA Europa League	21 September 2023	14 December 2023	Group stage	Group stage	6	1	1	4	3	10	−7	16.67
Total					47	19	14	14	65	53	+12	40.43

Last updated: 10 May 2024
Source: Soccerway

=== Ekstraklasa ===
==== League table ====
Pos	Team	Pld	W	D	L	GF	GA	GD	Pts
5	Lech Poznań	34	14	11	9	47	41	+6	53
6	Górnik Zabrze	34	15	8	11	45	41	+4	53
7	Raków Częstochowa	34	14	10	10	54	39	+15	52
8	Zagłębie Lubin	34	13	8	13	43	50	−7	47
9	Widzew Łódź	34	13	7	14	45	46	−1	46

Source: ekstraklasa.org 90minut.pl
Rules for classification: 1) Points; 2) Head-to-head points; 3) Head-to-head goal difference; 4) Goal difference; 5) Goals scored; 6) Number of wins; 7) Number of away wins; 8) Lower number of points based on yellow and red cards (red card = 3 points, yellow card = 1 point, sending-off = 3 points - including 1 point for first yellow card); 9) Fairplay ranking; 10) Draw.
(Note: Head-to-head record is used only after all the matches between the teams in question have been played)

==== Results summary ====
Overall								Home						Away					
Pld	W	D	L	GF	GA	GD	Pts	W	D	L	GF	GA	GD	W	D	L	GF	GA	GD
31	13	10	8	51	34	+17	49	9	5	1	30	8	+22	4	5	7	21	26	−5

Last updated: 10 May 2024.
Source: Ekstraklasa

==== Results by round ====
Round	1
Ground	
Result	
Position	

Updated to match(es) played on 25 November 2023. Source: Ekstraklasa
A = Away; H = Home; W = Win; D = Draw; L = Loss

==== Matches ====
25 November 2023 16	Raków Częstochowa	1–1	Cracovia	Częstochowa
15:00 CET (UTC+1)				Stadium: Miejski Stadion Piłkarski "Raków"

3 December 2023 17	Śląsk Wrocław	v	Raków Częstochowa	Wrocław
17:30 CET (UTC+1)				Stadium: Stadion Wrocław

=== Polish Cup ===
2 November 2023 Round of 32	ŁKS Łódź	0–2 (a.e.t.)	Raków Częstochowa	Łódź
18:00 CET (UTC+1)			Kocherhin 109'; Lederman 120'	Stadium: Stadion Miejski im. Władysława Króla; Referee: Tomasz Kwiatkowski

6 December 2023 Round of 16	Raków Częstochowa	v	Cracovia	Częstochowa
18:00 CET (UTC+1)				Stadium: Miejski Stadion Piłkarski "Raków"

=== Polish Super Cup ===
15 July 2023 Final	Raków Częstochowa	0–0 (5–6 p)	Legia Warsaw	Częstochowa
20:10 CET (UTC+1)				Stadium: Miejski Stadion Piłkarski "Raków"; Referee: Szymon Marciniak

=== UEFA Champions League ===
==== Qualifying rounds ====
===== First qualifying round =====
11 July 2023 First leg	Raków Częstochowa (Poland)	1–0	(Estonia) Flora	Częstochowa, Poland
20:00 CEST (UTC+2)	Piasecki (yellow card) 29'; Kocherhin 54'	Report	Alliku (yellow card) 22'; Ojamaa (yellow card) 49'	Stadium: Miejski Stadion Piłkarski "Raków"; Attendance: 5,242; Referee: Arda Kardeşler (Turkey)

18 July 2023 Second leg	Flora (Estonia)	0–3 (0–4 agg.)	(Poland) Raków Częstochowa	Tallinn, Estonia
20:00 EEST (UTC+3)	Seppik (yellow card) 67'	Report	Zwoliński 47', 59'; Svarnas (yellow card) 57'; Papanikolaou 85'	Stadium: Lilleküla Stadium; Attendance: 3,204; Referee: Marian Barbu (Romania)
Note: Raków Częstochowa won 4–0 on aggregate.

===== Second qualifying round =====
26 July 2023 First leg	Raków Częstochowa (Poland)	3–2	(Azerbaijan) Qarabağ	Częstochowa, Poland
20:15 CEST (UTC+2)	Cebula (yellow card) 11'; Cafarguliyev 55' (o.g.); Piasecki 71'; Kittel 90+1'	Report	Benzia (yellow card) 35'; Xhixha 73', 75', (yellow card) 78'; Richard (yellow card) 90+8'	Stadium: Miejski Stadion Piłkarski "Raków"; Attendance: 5,451; Referee: Lukas Fähndrich (Switzerland)

2 August 2023 Second leg	Qarabağ (Azerbaijan)	1–1 (3–4 agg.)	(Poland) Raków Częstochowa	Baku, Azerbaijan
20:00 AZT (UTC+4)	Medina (yellow card) 47'; Xhixha 60'; Medvedev (yellow card) 89'; Janković (yellow card) 90+6'	Report	Tudor 52'; Jean Carlos (yellow card) 56'; Kovačević (yellow card) 90+2'	Stadium: Baku Olympic Stadium; Attendance: 31,257; Referee: Sven Jablonski (Germany)
Note: Raków Częstochowa won 4–3 on aggregate.

===== Third qualifying round =====
8 August 2023 First leg	Raków Częstochowa (Poland)	2–1	(Cyprus) Aris Limassol	Częstochowa, Poland
20:00 CEST (UTC+2)	Kocherhin 7'; Tudor (yellow card) 24'; Papanikolaou (yellow card) 39'; Piasecki 63' (pen.)	Report	Szöke (yellow card) 34'; T. Jahnigen (not on pitch) (yellow card) 86'; Mayambela 89'	Stadium: Miejski Stadion Piłkarski "Raków"; Attendance: 5,500; Referee: Duje Strukan (Croatia)

15 August 2023 Second leg	Aris Limassol (Cyprus)	0–1 (1–3 agg.)	(Poland) Raków Częstochowa	Limassol, Cyprus
20:00 EEST (UTC+3)	Moucketou-Moussounda (yellow card) 67'	Report	Cebula (yellow card) 21'; Tudor 49'; K. Waskowski (not on pitch) (yellow card) 61'; L. Włodarek (not on pitch) (yellow card) 81'	Stadium: Alphamega Stadium; Attendance: 3,959; Referee: Matej Jug (Slovenia)
Note: Raków Częstochowa won 3–1 on aggregate.

==== Play-off round ====
22 August 2023 First leg	Raków Częstochowa (Poland)	0–1	(Denmark) Copenhagen	Sosnowiec, Poland
21:00 CEST (UTC+2)		Report	Racovițan 9' (o.g.); Óskarsson (yellow card) 89'; Jelert (yellow card) 90+3'	Stadium: Zagłębiowski Park Sportowy; Attendance: 11,600; Referee: Irfan Peljto (Bosnia and Herzegovina)

30 August 2023 Second leg	Copenhagen (Denmark)	1–1 (2–1 agg.)	(Poland) Raków Częstochowa	Copenhagen, Denmark
21:00 CEST (UTC+2)	Vavro 35'; Claesson (yellow card) 48'; Lerager (yellow card) 81'; Diks (yellow card) 84'; Falk (yellow card) 88'	Report	Arsenić (yellow card) 12'; Rundić (yellow card) 42'; Kocherhin (yellow card) 68'; Zwoliński 87'	Stadium: Parken Stadium; Attendance: 34,737; Referee: István Kovács (Romania)
Note: Copenhagen won 2–1 on aggregate.

=== UEFA Europa League ===
==== Group stage ====
The draw for the group stage was held on 1 September 2023.

Pos	Team	Pld	W	D	L	GF	GA	GD	Pts	Qualification	ATA	SCP	STU	RAK
1	(Italy) Atalanta	6	4	2	0	12	4	+8	14	Advance to round of 16	—	1–1	1–0	2–0
2	(Portugal) Sporting CP	6	3	2	1	10	6	+4	11	Advance to knockout round play-offs	1–2	—	3–0	2–1
3	(Austria) Sturm Graz	6	1	1	4	4	9	−5	4 (Note: Tied on head-to-head results. Overall goal difference used as a tiebreaker.)	Transfer to Europa Conference League	2–2	1–2	—	0–1
4	(Poland) Raków Częstochowa	6	1	1	4	3	10	−7	4		0–4	1–1	0–1	—

Source: UEFA
Rules for classification: Group stage tiebreakers
Notes:

21 September 2023 1	Atalanta (Italy)	2–0	(Poland) Raków Częstochowa	Bergamo, Italy
21:00 CEST (UTC+2)	De Roon (yellow card) 32'; De Ketelaere 49'; Éderson 66'	Report		Stadium: Stadio Atleti Azzurri d'Italia; Attendance: 13,698; Referee: Roi Reinshreiber (Israel)

5 October 2023 2	Raków Częstochowa (Poland)	0–1	(Austria) Sturm Graz	Sosnowiec, Poland
18:45 CEST (UTC+2)	Papanikolaou (yellow card) 49'; Crnac (yellow card) 62'	Report	Bøving 24'; Danté (yellow card) 35'; Teixeira (yellow card) 88'	Stadium: Zagłębiowski Park Sportowy; Attendance: 8,993; Referee: Aliyar Aghayev (Azerbaijan)

26 October 2023 3	Raków Częstochowa (Poland)	1–1	(Portugal) Sporting CP	Sosnowiec, Poland
18:45 CEST (UTC+2)	Berggren (yellow card) 19'; Kocherhin (yellow card) 44'; Jean Carlos (yellow card) 47'; Piasecki 79'	Report	Gyökeres (red card) 8'; Coates (yellow card) 8', (goal) 14'; Diomande (yellow card) 67'	Stadium: Zagłębiowski Park Sportowy; Attendance: 10,518; Referee: Anastasios Papapetrou (Greece)

9 November 2023 4	Sporting CP (Portugal)	2–1	(Poland) Raków Częstochowa	Lisbon, Portugal
20:00 WET (UTC±0)	Gonçalves 14' (pen.), 52' (pen.); Inácio (yellow card) 29'; Paulinho (yellow card) 85'	Report	Racovițan (red card) 12'; Rundić 70'	Stadium: Estádio José Alvalade; Attendance: 32,940; Referee: Enea Jorgji (Albania)

30 November 2023 5	Sturm Graz (Austria)	0–1	(Poland) Raków Częstochowa	Graz, Austria
18:45 CET (UTC+1)	Sarkaria (yellow card) 82'; Affengruber (yellow card) 89'	Report	K. Waskowski (not on pitch) (yellow card) 73'; Yeboah 81'; Tudor (yellow card) 82'; Plavšić (yellow card) 90+3'	Stadium: Liebenauer Stadium; Attendance: 12,517; Referee: Filip Glova (Slovakia)

14 December 2023 6	Raków Częstochowa (Poland)	0–4	(Italy) Atalanta	Sosnowiec, Poland
21:00 CET (UTC+1)	Tudor (yellow card) 76'	Report	Muriel 14', 72'; Bonfanti 26', (yellow card) 79'; Holm (yellow card) 33'; De Ketelaere 90+2'	Stadium: Zagłębiowski Park Sportowy; Attendance: 10,386; Referee: Enea Jorgji (Albania)
