= Vladyslav Kocherhin =

Ukrainian footballer

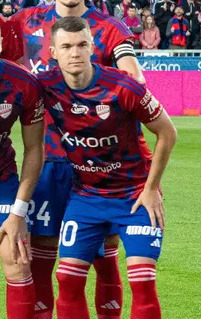
- Kocherhin with Raków Częstochowa in 2023

Personal information
- Full name: Vladyslav Serhiyovych Kocherhin
- Date of birth: 30 April 1996 (age 30)
- Place of birth: Odesa, Ukraine
- Height: 1.78 m (5 ft 10 in)
- Position: Midfielder

Team information
- Current team: Raków Częstochowa
- Number: 10

Youth career
- 2009–2012: Youth Sportive School #11 Odesa
- 2012–2016: Dnipro Dnipropetrovsk

Senior career*
Years	Team	Apps	(Gls)
2016–2017	Dnipro	25	(6)
2017–2022	Zorya Luhansk	96	(19)
2022–	Raków Częstochowa	108	(18)

International career
2012	Ukraine U16	2	(0)
2012	Ukraine U17	5	(3)
2013–2014	Ukraine U18	7	(1)
2016	Ukraine U20	2	(0)
2017	Ukraine U21	4	(0)
2021	Ukraine	1	(0)
- * Club domestic league appearances and goals as of 22:02, 28 August 2026 (UTC)

Vladyslav Kocherhin (Ukrainian: Владислав Сергійович Кочергін; born 30 April 1996) is a Ukrainian professional footballer who plays as a midfielder for Ekstraklasa club Raków Częstochowa.

== Club career ==
Kocherhin is a product of the Youth Sportive School ♯11 in Odesa and the FC Dnipro Sportive School. His first trainers in FC Dnipro were Volodymyr Knysh and Ihor Khomenko.

He made his debut as a substituted player in a second half-time for FC Dnipro in the match against FC Volyn Lutsk on 24 July 2016 in the Ukrainian Premier League and scored one goal.

He scored a hat-trick for Zorya Luhansk in a 5-1 away win against Inhulets Petrove on 2 August 2021.

In January 2022, Kocherhin agreed to join Polish Ekstraklasa side Raków Częstochowa on a three-year deal, starting from 1 July 2022. Due to the Russian invasion of Ukraine, his contract with Zorya was suspended under new FIFA rules. He was therefore able to join his new side earlier than planned and was officially announced as Raków's new signing on 26 March 2022.

== International career ==
Kocherhin made his Ukraine national team debut on 8 September 2021 in a friendly against the Czech Republic, a 1–1 away draw.

== Career statistics ==
As of match played 27 August 2026

Appearances and goals by club, season and competition
Club	Season	League			National cup (Note: Includes Ukrainian Cup, Polish Cup)		Continental		Other		Total	
Club	Season	Division	Apps	Goals	Apps	Goals	Apps	Goals	Apps	Goals	Apps	Goals
Dnipro	2016–17	Ukrainian Premier League	25	6	2	0	—		—		27	6
Dnipro	Total		25	6	2	0	—		—		27	6
Zorya Luhansk	2017–18	Ukrainian Premier League	13	0	1	0	2 (Note: Appearance(s) in UEFA Europa League)	0	—		16	0
Zorya Luhansk	2018–19	Ukrainian Premier League	18	1	0	0	4	0	—		22	1
Zorya Luhansk	2019–20	Ukrainian Premier League	32	7	1	0	6	1	—		39	8
Zorya Luhansk	2020–21	Ukrainian Premier League	23	6	4	2	6	1	—		33	9
Zorya Luhansk	2021–22	Ukrainian Premier League	10	5	0	0	4 (Note: Two appearances in UEFA Europa League, two appearances in UEFA Europa Conference League)	0	—		14	5
Zorya Luhansk	Total		96	19	6	2	22	2	—		124	23
Raków Częstochowa	2021–22	Ekstraklasa	3	0	0	0	—		—		3	0
Raków Częstochowa	2022–23	Ekstraklasa	33	8	5	1	6	3	1 (Note: Appearance in Polish Super Cup)	0	45	12
Raków Częstochowa	2023–24	Ekstraklasa	32	5	3	1	14 (Note: Eight appearances and two goals in UEFA Champions League, six appearances in UEFA Europa League)	2	1	0	50	8
Raków Częstochowa	2024–25	Ekstraklasa	34	5	1	0	—		—		35	5
Raków Częstochowa	2025–26	Ekstraklasa	3	0	0	0	0	0	—		3	0
Raków Częstochowa	2026–27	Ekstraklasa	3	0	0	0	6 (Note: Appearances in UEFA Conference League)	0	—		9	0
Raków Częstochowa	Total		108	18	9	2	26	5	2	0	145	25
Career total			229	43	17	4	48	7	2	0	296	54

=== International ===
Appearances and goals by national team and year
National team	Year	Apps	Goals
Ukraine
Ukraine	2021	1	0
Total		1	0

== Honours ==
Dnipro Reserves

- Sait Nagjee Football Tournament: 2016

Raków Częstochowa

- Ekstraklasa: 2022–23
- Polish Super Cup: 2022

Individual

- Sait Nagjee Football Tournament top scorer: 2016
- Ukrainian Premier League Player of the Month: November 2020
