= Mateusz Wdowiak =

Polish footballer

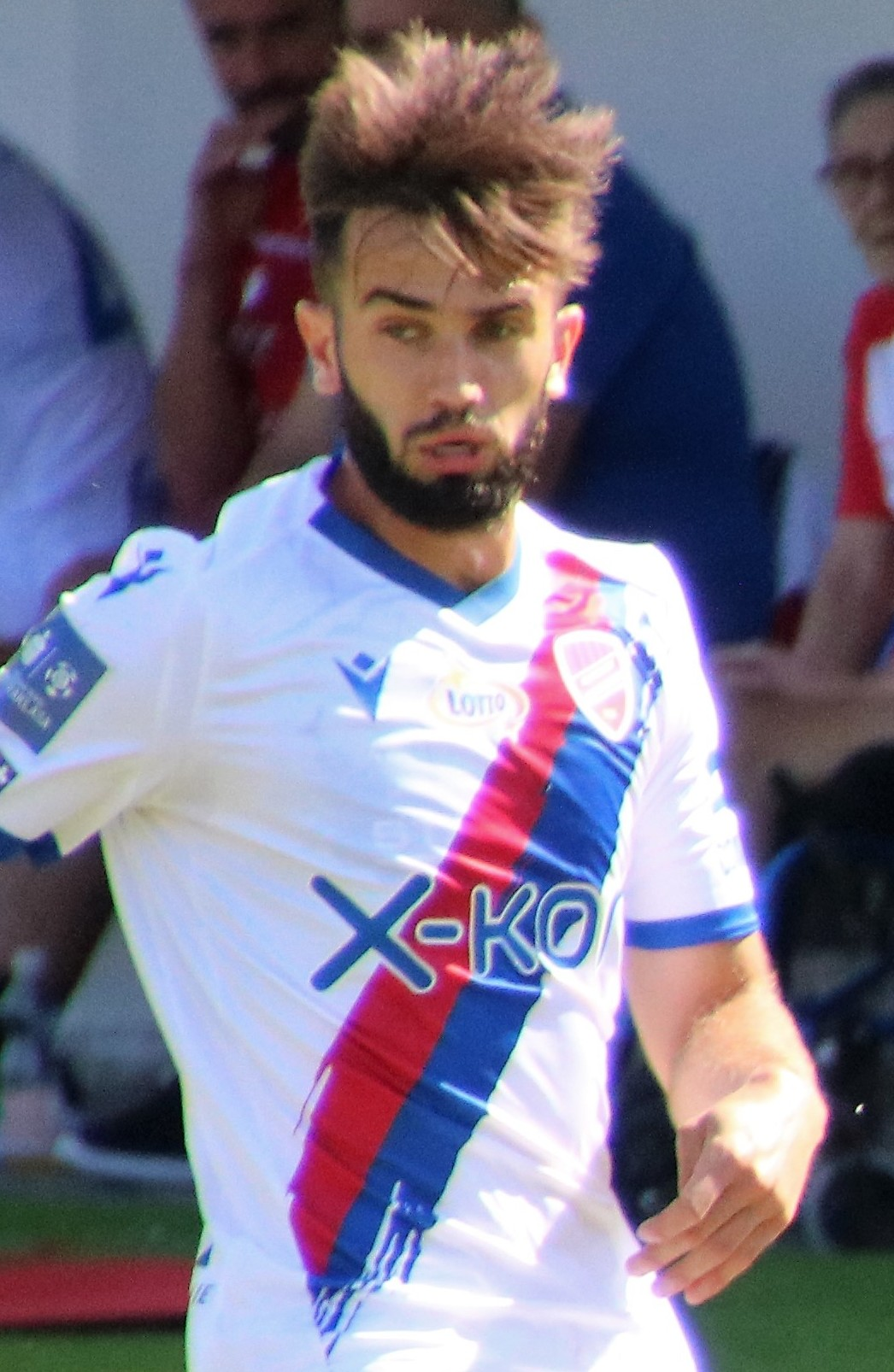
- Wdowiak in 2021 with Raków Częstochowa

Personal information
- Full name: Mateusz Wdowiak
- Date of birth: 28 August 1996 (age 30)
- Place of birth: Kraków, Poland
- Height: 1.74 m (5 ft 9 in)
- Position: Winger

Team information
- Current team: GKS Katowice
- Number: 7

Youth career
- –2015: Cracovia

Senior career*
Years	Team	Apps	(Gls)
2015–2021	Cracovia	133	(8)
2017	→ Sandecja Nowy Sącz (loan)	15	(1)
2021–2023	Raków Częstochowa	73	(10)
2023–2026	Zagłębie Lubin	67	(9)
2026–	GKS Katowice	24	(3)

International career
2015	Poland U19	2	(0)
2015–2017	Poland U20	10	(0)
2019	Poland U21	2	(0)
- * Club domestic league appearances and goals as of 11:10, 20 September 2026 (UTC)

Mateusz Wdowiak (born 28 August 1996) is a Polish professional footballer who plays as a winger for Ekstraklasa club GKS Katowice.

== Club career ==
=== Cracovia ===
Wdowiak came through the youth academy of Cracovia and progressed to the club's first team. He made his Ekstraklasa debut on 15 February 2015, replacing Krzysztof Nykiel during a 1–1 home draw against Śląsk Wrocław. His cross late in the match led to Marcin Budziński's equalising goal.

On 20 March 2016, Wdowiak scored his first Ekstraklasa goal, giving Cracovia a temporary lead with a long-range strike in a 2–2 away draw against Pogoń Szczecin.

==== Loan to Sandecja Nowy Sącz ====
In January 2017, after receiving limited playing time during the first half of the season, Wdowiak joined second-tier club Sandecja Nowy Sącz on loan for the remainder of the campaign. He made 15 league appearances and scored once as Sandecja won the I liga title and secured the first promotion to the Ekstraklasa in the club's history.

==== Return to Cracovia ====
Wdowiak returned to Cracovia following the loan and gradually established himself in the first team. During the first half of the 2018–19 season, he became a regular starter and signed a contract extension in December 2018, prolonging his agreement until June 2021.

He played an important role in Cracovia's successful 2019–20 Polish Cup campaign. On 7 July 2020, he scored twice in a 3–0 semi-final victory over Legia Warsaw. In the final against Lechia Gdańsk on 24 July, Wdowiak scored in the 117th minute to complete a 3–2 extra-time victory. The result gave Cracovia the first Polish Cup in the club's history.

After the parties did not reach an agreement over another contract extension, Wdowiak signed a three-year deal with Raków Częstochowa in January 2021, initially due to take effect the following July. Cracovia and Raków subsequently agreed an immediate permanent transfer, which was completed on 15 February 2021. Wdowiak left Cracovia after making 152 appearances in all competitions, scoring 13 goals and providing 22 assists.

=== Raków Częstochowa ===
Wdowiak joined Raków during the second half of the 2020–21 season. He made nine league appearances during the remainder of the campaign and was part of the team that won the 2020–21 Polish Cup. Raków also won the 2021 Polish Super Cup at the beginning of the following season.

During the 2021–22 campaign, Wdowiak made 33 league appearances and scored seven goals. He also scored four times in the Polish Cup, finishing as the competition's joint leading goalscorer. On 2 May 2022, he scored Raków's second goal in a 3–1 victory over Lech Poznań in the Polish Cup final.

On 9 July 2022, Wdowiak scored again against Lech, netting the second goal in Raków's 2–0 victory in the 2022 Polish Super Cup.

Wdowiak made 30 league appearances and scored three goals during the 2022–23 season, when Raków won the first Polish championship in the club's history. He left the club in August 2023, having recorded 98 appearances, 17 goals and seven assists in all competitions.

=== Zagłębie Lubin ===
On 8 August 2023, Wdowiak signed a contract with Zagłębie Lubin valid until June 2026. He made his debut three days later, coming on as a second-half substitute in a 2–1 away defeat against his former club Cracovia.

Wdowiak spent two and a half seasons with Zagłębie. He made 73 appearances in all competitions, scoring nine goals and providing six assists. His contract, which had been due to expire at the end of the 2025–26 season, was terminated by mutual consent in January 2026.

=== GKS Katowice ===
On 9 January 2026, Wdowiak joined GKS Katowice, signing a contract until 30 June 2027. He made his competitive debut on 30 January, starting in a 2–0 away league victory over his former club Zagłębie Lubin.

During the remainder of the 2025–26 season, Wdowiak made 16 league appearances and scored twice for GKS. He also appeared in two Polish Cup matches.

== International career ==
Wdowiak represented Poland at under-19, under-20 and under-21 level. In May 2019, he was named in Czesław Michniewicz's 23-man squad for the 2019 UEFA European Under-21 Championship in Italy and San Marino.

== Career statistics ==
As of match played 12 August 2026

Appearances and goals by club, season and competition
Club	Season	League			Polish Cup		Continental		Other		Total	
Club	Season	Division	Apps	Goals	Apps	Goals	Apps	Goals	Apps	Goals	Apps	Goals
Cracovia	2014–15	Ekstraklasa	12	0	1	0	—		—		13	0
Cracovia	2015–16	Ekstraklasa	16	1	3	0	—		—		19	1
Cracovia	2016–17	Ekstraklasa	13	1	1	0	2 (Note: Appearance(s) in UEFA Europa League)	0	—		16	1
Cracovia	2017–18	Ekstraklasa	26	1	2	0	—		—		28	1
Cracovia	2018–19	Ekstraklasa	34	3	1	0	—		—		35	3
Cracovia	2019–20	Ekstraklasa	29	2	5	4	2	0	—		36	6
Cracovia	2020–21	Ekstraklasa	3	0	1	1	1	0	—		5	1
Cracovia	Total		133	8	14	5	5	0	—		152	13
Sandecja Nowy Sącz (loan)	2016–17	I liga	15	1	—		—		—		15	1
Raków Częstochowa	2020–21	Ekstraklasa	9	0	1	0	—		—		10	0
Raków Częstochowa	2021–22	Ekstraklasa	33	7	6	4	5 (Note: Appearances in UEFA Conference League)	0	1 (Note: Appearance in Polish Super Cup)	0	45	11
Raków Częstochowa	2022–23	Ekstraklasa	30	3	3	1	6	1	1	1	40	6
Raków Częstochowa	2023–24	Ekstraklasa	1	0	0	0	2 (Note: Appearances in UEFA Champions League)	0	0	0	3	0
Raków Częstochowa	Total		73	10	10	5	13	1	2	1	98	17
Zagłębie Lubin	2023–24	Ekstraklasa	28	5	2	0	—		—		30	5
Zagłębie Lubin	2024–25	Ekstraklasa	28	4	3	0	—		—		31	4
Zagłębie Lubin	2025–26	Ekstraklasa	11	0	1	0	—		—		12	0
Zagłębie Lubin	Total		67	9	6	0	—		—		73	9
GKS Katowice	2025–26	Ekstraklasa	16	2	2	0	—		—		18	2
GKS Katowice	2026–27	Ekstraklasa	2	0	0	0	2	1	—		4	1
GKS Katowice	Total		18	2	2	0	2	1	—		22	3
Career total			306	30	32	10	20	2	2	1	360	43

== Honours ==
Cracovia II

- IV liga Lesser Poland West: 2014–15, 2019–20

Sandecja

- I liga: 2016–17

Cracovia

- Polish Cup: 2019–20

Raków Częstochowa

- Ekstraklasa: 2022–23
- Polish Cup: 2020–21, 2021–22
- Polish Super Cup: 2021, 2022

Individual

- Polish Cup top scorer: 2021–22
