= 2022 Polish Super Cup =

Football competition

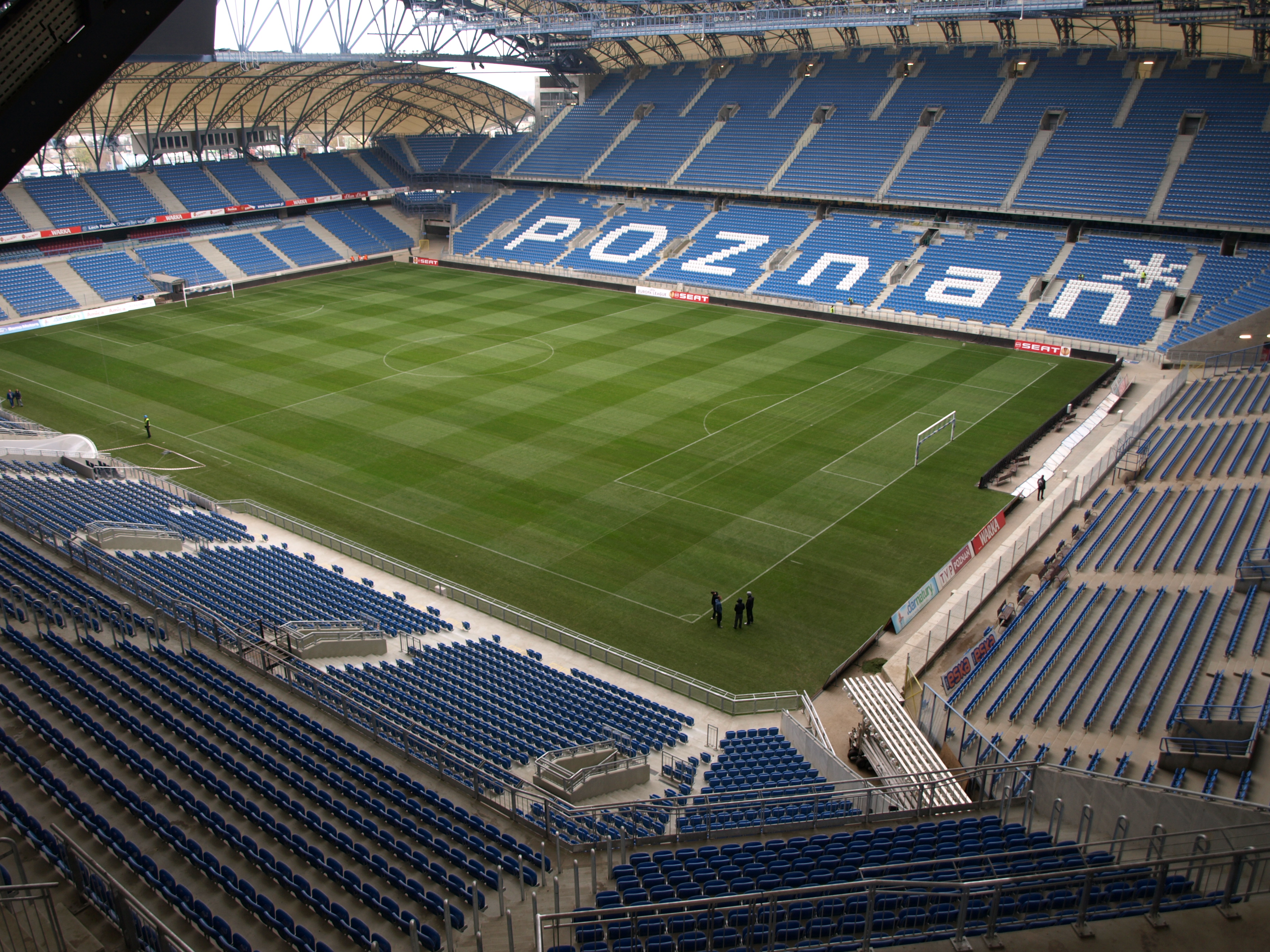
- The Poznań Stadium in Poznań hosted the final.
Lech Poznań	Raków Częstochowa
0	2
- Date: 9 July 2022
- Venue: Stadion Poznań, Poznań
- Referee: Paweł Raczkowski (Warsaw)
- Attendance: 15,898
- Weather: 21 °C (70 °F)

The 2022 Polish Super Cup was the 31st Polish Super Cup, an annual Polish football match played between the reigning winners of the Ekstraklasa and Polish Cup. The Ekstraklasa champions Lech Poznań faced Polish Cup winners Raków Częstochowa.

Raków were the defending champions and successfully defended their title by defeating Lech Poznań 2–0.

== Match ==
9 July 2022
20:10 CEST (UTC+02:00)

Lech Poznań	0–2	Raków Częstochowa
	Report	Racovițan 43'; Wdowiak 51'

Stadion Poznań, Poznań
Attendance: 15,898
Referee: Paweł Raczkowski (Warsaw)

Lech Poznań	Raków Częstochowa

GK	35	(Poland) Filip Bednarek
RB	44	(Poland) Alan Czerwiński
CB	30	(Georgia (country)) Nika Kvekveskiri	(yellow card) 47'
CB	16	(Croatia) Antonio Milić
LB	3	(Scotland) Barry Douglas
CM	22	(Poland) Radosław Murawski (c)		(substituted off) 74'
CM	6	(Sweden) Jesper Karlström	(yellow card) 8'	(substituted off) 64'
RW	50	(Ivory Coast) Adriel Ba Loua		(substituted off) 74'
AM	17	(Poland) Filip Szymczak
LW	14	(Georgia (country)) Heorhiy Tsitaishvili	(yellow card) 45+3'	(substituted off) 74'
CF	90	(Poland) Artur Sobiech		(substituted off) 58'
Substitutes:
GK	1	(Ukraine) Artur Rudko
DF	2	(Portugal) Joel Pereira
DF	5	(Portugal) Pedro Rebocho
DF	20	(Poland) Maksymilian Pingot		(substituted on) 74'
MF	7	(Portugal) Afonso Sousa		(substituted on) 64'
MF	10	(Spain) Dani Ramírez	(yellow card) 79'	(substituted on) 58'
MF	21	(Poland) Michał Skóraś		(substituted on) 74'
MF	23	(Poland) Kristoffer Velde		(substituted on) 74'
FW	9	(Sweden) Mikael Ishak
Manager:
(Netherlands) John van den Brom

GK	1	(Bosnia and Herzegovina) Vladan Kovačević
RCB	25	(Romania) Bogdan Racovițan
CB	24	(Croatia) Zoran Arsenić (c)
LCB	3	(Serbia) Milan Rundić	(yellow card) 90+3'
RM	7	(Croatia) Fran Tudor
RCM	66	(Greece) Giannis Papanikolaou	(yellow card) 8'	(substituted off) 84'
LCM	8	(United States) Ben Lederman	(yellow card) 29'	(substituted off) 88'
LM	23	(Poland) Patryk Kun
RW	17	(Poland) Mateusz Wdowiak		(substituted off) 78'
LW	11	(Spain) Ivi	(yellow card) 48'	(substituted off) 84'
CF	21	(Latvia) Vladislavs Gutkovskis		(substituted off) 78'
Substitutes:
GK	12	(Poland) Kacper Trelowski
DF	4	(Poland) Stratos Svarnas
MF	10	(Poland) Igor Sapała		(substituted on) 84'
MF	22	(Romania) Deian Sorescu
MF	30	(Ukraine) Vladyslav Kocherhin		(substituted on) 78'
MF	55	(Poland) Szymon Czyż		(substituted on) 88'
MF	71	(Poland) Wiktor Długosz		(substituted on) 84'
FW	9	(Poland) Sebastian Musiolik		(substituted on) 78'
FW	70	(Portugal) Fábio Sturgeon
Manager:
(Poland) Marek Papszun

Match rules

- 90 minutes.
- Penalty shoot-out if scores still level.
- Nine named substitutes.
- Maximum of five substitutions.

== See also ==
- 2022–23 Ekstraklasa
- 2022–23 Polish Cup
