= Giannis Papanikolaou =

Greek footballer (born 1998)

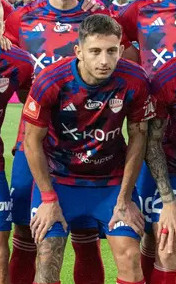
- Papanikolaou with Raków Częstochowa in 2023

Personal information
- Date of birth: 18 November 1998 (age 27)
- Place of birth: Athens, Greece
- Height: 1.82 m (6 ft 0 in)
- Position: Midfielder

Team information
- Current team: Widzew Łódź
- Number: 5

Youth career
- 2006–2014: AEK Athens
- 2014–2016: Platanias

Senior career*
Years	Team	Apps	(Gls)
2016–2019	Platanias	42	(3)
2019–2020	Panionios	30	(0)
2020–2024	Raków Częstochowa	81	(7)
2024–2026	Çaykur Rizespor	52	(1)
2026–	Widzew Łódź	0	(0)

International career
2019–2020	Greece U21	6	(0)
2022–2023	Greece	4	(0)
- * Club domestic league appearances and goals as of 10 June 2026

Giannis Papanikolaou (Greek: Γιάννης Παπανικολάου; born 18 November 1998) is a Greek professional footballer who plays as a midfielder for Ekstraklasa club Widzew Łódź.

== Club career ==
=== Platanias ===
On 23 April 2017, Papanikolaou made his official debut in a 3–1 home loss against PAOK. On 5 November 2017, he scored his first professional goal in a 5–1 away loss against Olympiacos.

=== Panionios ===
On 11 June 2019, Panionios officially announced the signing of Papanikolaou on a free transfer. The young winger, who made 31 appearances during the 2018–19 season, scoring four goals and giving five assists, joined the club, following his refusal to renew his contract with Platanias.

=== Raków Częstochowa ===
On 11 August 2020, Papanikolaou joined Polish Ekstraklasa club Raków Częstochowa, on a contract until the end of June 2021, and an available option of a four-years extension of the contract. On 8 February 2021, the club announced they have made use of the option and have extended his contract until the end of June 2025. On 12 February 2022, he opened the score with a kick in the left corner in an away 1–0 win game against Radomiak Radom in the 20th second of the game. It was his first goal with the club in all competitions.

During his four-year stay, Papanikolaou made 118 appearances for Raków across all competitions, and one for their reserve team, and contributed to their first-ever league title, two national cup and two Super Cup wins.

=== Caykur Rizespor ===
On 13 June 2024, Turkish Süper Lig club Çaykur Rizespor announced they have reached an agreement with Raków to sign Papanikolaou on a three-year contract.

=== Widzew Łódź ===
On 26 July 2026, Papanikolaou returned to Poland to join Ekstraklasa club Widzew Łódź on a two-year contract, with an option to extend.

== International career ==
Papanikolaou was called up by the senior Greece side for the 2022–23 UEFA Nations League matches against Northern Ireland on 2 June 2022, against Kosovo on 5 June 2022 and 12 June 2022 and against Cyprus on 9 June 2022.

== Career statistics ==
=== Club ===
As of match played 15 May 2026

Appearances and goals by club, season and competition
Club	Season	League			National cup (Note: Includes Greek Cup, Polish Cup, Turkish Cup)		Continental		Other		Total	
Club	Season	Division	Apps	Goals	Apps	Goals	Apps	Goals	Apps	Goals	Apps	Goals
Platanias	2016–17	Super League Greece	2	0	0	0	—		—		2	0
Platanias	2017–18	Super League Greece	12	1	3	0	—		—		15	1
Platanias	2018–19	Football League	28	2	1	1	—		—		29	3
Platanias	Total		42	3	4	1	—		—		46	4
Panionios	2019–20	Super League Greece	30	0	2	1	—		—		32	1
Raków Częstochowa	2020–21	Ekstraklasa	7	0	3	0	—		—		10	0
Raków Częstochowa	2021–22	Ekstraklasa	26	1	5	0	6 (Note: Appearances in UEFA Europa Conference League)	0	1 (Note: Appearance in Polish Super Cup)	0	38	1
Raków Częstochowa	2022–23	Ekstraklasa	31	1	5	0	6	0	1	0	43	1
Raków Częstochowa	2023–24	Ekstraklasa	17	5	0	0	9 (Note: Five appearances in UEFA Champions League, two appearances in UEFA Europa League)	1	1	0	27	6
Raków Częstochowa	Total		81	7	13	0	21	1	3	0	118	8
Çaykur Rizespor	2024–25	Süper Lig	22	0	3	2	—		—		25	2
Çaykur Rizespor	2025–26	Süper Lig	30	1	1	1	—		—		31	2
Çaykur Rizespor	Total		52	1	4	3	—		—		56	4
Widzew Łódź	2026–27	Ekstraklasa	0	0	0	0	—		—		0	0
Career total			205	11	23	5	21	1	3	0	252	17

=== International ===
As of match played 10 September 2023

Appearances and goals by national team and year
National team	Year	Apps	Goals
Greece
Greece	2022	2	0
Greece	2023	2	0
Total		4	0

== Honours ==
Raków Częstochowa

- Ekstraklasa: 2022–23
- Polish Cup: 2020–21, 2021–22
- Polish Super Cup: 2021, 2022

Raków Częstochowa II

- IV liga Silesia I: 2021–22
