= 2021–22 Raków Częstochowa season =

Raków Częstochowa
2021–22 season
- Chairman: Wojciech Cygan
- Manager: Marek Papszun
- Stadium: Stadion Miejski
- Ekstraklasa: 2nd
- Polish Cup: Winners
- Polish Super Cup: Winners
- UEFA Europa Conference League: Play-off round
- Top goalscorer: League: Ivi (18); All: Ivi (20)
Home colours	Away colours	Third colours

The 2021–22 season was Raków Częstochowa's third consecutive campaign in the Ekstraklasa, the top-flight of Polish football. In addition to the domestic league, the club competed in the Polish Cup, the Polish Super Cup, and the inaugural edition of the UEFA Europa Conference League.

On 17 July 2021, Raków Częstochowa defeated reigning Ekstraklasa title holders Legia Warsaw in penalties in the Polish Super Cup.

On 2 May 2022, Raków defeated Lech Poznań 3–1 and secured its second consecutive Polish Cup.

== First-team squad ==
As of 10 August 2021

Note: Flags indicate national team as defined under FIFA eligibility rules; some limited exceptions apply. Players may hold more than one non-FIFA nationality.

No.	Pos.	Nation	Player
1	GK	BIH	Vladan Kovačević
2	DF	CZE	Tomáš Petrášek
3	DF	SRB	Milan Rundic
6	DF	POL	Andrzej Niewulis
7	MF	CRO	Fran Tudor
8	MF	POL	Ben Lederman
9	FW	POL	Sebastian Musiolik
10	MF	POL	Igor Sapała
11	MF	ESP	Ivi
12	GK	POL	Kacper Trelowski
14	MF	POL	Daniel Szelągowski
15	FW	POR	Alexandre Guedes
17	MF	POL	Mateusz Wdowiak
18	FW	POL	Jakub Arak

No.	Pos.	Nation	Player
19	DF	AUS	Jordan Courtney-Perkins
20	MF	SRB	Marko Poletanović
21	FW	LAT	Vladislavs Gutkovskis
22	MF	POL	Iwo Kaczmarski
23	MF	POL	Patryk Kun
24	DF	SRB	Zoran Arsenić
27	MF	CZE	Daniel Bartl
31	DF	SRB	Žarko Udovičić
32	MF	POL	Piotr Owczarek
43	MF	SLO	David Tijanić
66	MF	GRE	Giannis Papanikolaou
70	MF	POR	Fábio Sturgeon
71	MF	POL	Wiktor Długosz
77	MF	POL	Marcin Cebula

== Transfers ==
=== In ===
No.	Pos	Player	Transferred from	Fee	Date	Source
1	GK	(Bosnia and Herzegovina) Vladan Kovačević	(Bosnia and Herzegovina) Sarajevo	Undisclosed	18 June 2021	
19	DF	(Australia) Jordan Courtney-Perkins	(Australia) Brisbane Roar	Free	29 June 2021	
31	DF	(Serbia) Žarko Udovičić	(Poland) Lechia Gdańsk	Free	1 July 2021	
15	FW	(Portugal) Alexandre Guedes	(Portugal) Famalicão	Undisclosed	23 July 2021	
88	MF	(Georgia (country)) Valerian Gvilia	(Poland) Legia Warsaw	Undisclosed	31 August 2021	

== Pre-season and friendlies ==
Win Draw Loss Fixtures

10 July 2021 Friendly	Red Bull Salzburg (Austria)	2–2	(Poland) Raków Częstochowa	Bramberg am Wildkogel, Austria
15:00 CEST (UTC+2)	Adeyemi 48'; Ludewig 65'	Report	Sapała 4' (pen.); Musiolik 30'	Referee: Samuel Sampl
Note: The match was played in two halves of 45 minutes and one half of 30 minutes.

== Competitions ==
=== Overall record ===
Competition	First match	Last match	Starting round	Final position	Record							
Competition	First match	Last match	Starting round	Final position	Pld	W	D	L	GF	GA	GD	Win %
Ekstraklasa	25 July 2021	21 May 2022	Matchday 1	2nd	34	20	9	5	60	30	+30	58.82
Polish Cup	22 September 2021	2 May 2022	Round of 64	Winners	6	6	0	0	14	4	+10	100.00
Super Cup	17 July 2021		Final	Winners	1	0	1	0	1	1	+0	0.00
UEFA Europa Conference League	22 July 2021	26 August 2021	Second qualifying round	Play-off round	6	2	3	1	2	3	−1	33.33
Total					47	28	13	6	77	38	+39	59.57

Source: 90minut.pl

=== Ekstraklasa ===
==== League table ====
Pos	Team	Pld	W	D	L	GF	GA	GD	Pts	Qualification or relegation
1	Lech Poznań (C)	34	22	8	4	67	24	+43	74	Qualification for the Champions League first qualifying round
2	Raków Częstochowa	34	20	9	5	60	30	+30	69	Qualification for the Europa Conference League second qualifying round
3	Pogoń Szczecin	34	18	11	5	63	31	+32	65	Qualification for the Europa Conference League first qualifying round (Note: Since the winners of the 2021–22 Polish Cup, Raków Częstochowa, qualified for the Europa Conference League based on league position, the second Europa Conference League first qualifying round berth was transferred to the 4th-placed team.)
4	Lechia Gdańsk	34	16	9	9	52	39	+13	57	Qualification for the Europa Conference League first qualifying round
5	Piast Gliwice	34	15	9	10	45	37	+8	54	

Source: ekstraklasa.org
Rules for classification: 1) Points; 2) Head-to-head points; 3) Head-to-head goal difference; 4) Goal difference; 5) Goals scored; 6) Number of wins; 7) Number of away wins; 8) Lower number of points based on yellow and red cards (red card = 3 points, yellow card = 1 point, sending-off = 3 points - including 1 point for first yellow card); 9) Fairplay ranking; 10) Draw. (Note: Head-to-head record is used only after all the matches between the teams in question have been played)
(C) Champions

==== Results summary ====
Overall								Home						Away					
Pld	W	D	L	GF	GA	GD	Pts	W	D	L	GF	GA	GD	W	D	L	GF	GA	GD
31	19	8	4	56	28	+28	65	9	5	1	31	12	+19	10	3	3	25	16	+9

Last updated: 24 April 2022.
Source: 90minut.pl

==== Results by round ====
Round	1	2	3	4	5	6	7	8	9	10	11	12	13	14	15	16	17	18	19	20	21	22	23	24	25	26	27	28	29	30	31	32	33	34
Ground	A	A	A	H	H	A	H	A	A	H	A	H	A	H	A	H	A	H	A	H	A	A	H	A	H	H	A	H	A	H	A	H	A	H
Result	W	L	W	D	L	D	D	W	W	W	W	W	D	D	L	W	L	W	W	W	W	D	W	W	W	D	W	D	W	W	W			
Position	3	11	4	9	11	10	10	6	6	4	3	2	4	4	4	4	4	4	3	3	3	3	3	2	1	2	2	3	3	1	1			

Updated to match(es) played on 24 April 2022. Source: ekstraklasa.org
A = Away; H = Home; W = Win; D = Draw; L = Loss

==== Matches ====
25 July 2021 1	Piast Gliwice	2–3	Raków Częstochowa	Gliwice
15:00 CEST	Chrapek 5' (yellow card) 45+2'; Tyukavin 66'; Huk (yellow card) 58'	Report	Papanikolaou (yellow card) 6'; Wdowiak 43'; Długosz 70'; Ivi 74' (pen.); Tudor (yellow card) 90+3'	Stadium: Stadion Piasta Gliwice; Referee: Szymon Marciniak

1 August 2021 2	Jagiellonia Białystok	3–0	Raków Częstochowa	Białystok
20:00 CEST	Romanczuk 35', 87'; Imaz 38'	Report	Guedes (yellow card) 51'; Courtney-Perkins (yellow card) 64'	Stadium: Stadion Jagiellonii Białystok; Referee: Sebastian Jarzebak

8 August 2021 3	Wisła Kraków	1–2	Raków Częstochowa	Kraków
17:30 CEST	Yeboah 24'	Report	Musiolik (yellow card) 34'; Papanikolaou (red card) 51'; Cebula 61' (yellow card) 72'; Gutkovskis 79' (yellow card) 90+2'	Stadium: Stadion Miejski Wisły; Referee: Krzysztof Jakubik

28 August 2021 6	Wisła Płock	1–1	Raków Częstochowa	Płock
12:30 CEST	Warchoł 37'	Report	Cebula 19'	Stadium: Stadion Wisły Płock; Referee: Pawel Malec

12 September 2021 7	Raków Częstochowa	2–2	Lech Poznań	Częstochowa
17:30 CEST (UTC+02:00)	Cebula 14' (pen.); Musiolik 48'	Ekstraklasa; 90minut	Amaral 57'; Ishak 73' (pen.)	Stadium: Miejski Stadion Piłkarski „Raków” Attendance: 5,200; Referee: Szymon Marciniak (Płock)

19 September 2021 8	Stal Mielec	0–3	Raków Częstochowa	Warsaw
12:30 CEST		Report	Ivi 58'; Gutkovskis 80'; Wdowiak 90+1'	Stadium: Stadion Stali Mielec; Attendance: 3,125; Referee: Pawel Malec

25 September 2021 9	Legia Warsaw	2–3	Raków Częstochowa	Warsaw
20:00 CEST	Emreli 33'; Kharatin 70'	Report	Ivi 29' (pen.), 57'; Tudor 53'	Stadium: Stadion Wojska Polskiego; Attendance: 15,870; Referee: Jarosław Przybył

29 September 2021 4	Raków Częstochowa	2–2	Radomiak Radom	Częstochowa
CEST	Ivi 6' (pen.); Musiolik 79'	Report	Maurides 23', 72'	Stadium: Miejski Stadion Piłkarski „Raków” Attendance: 2,098; Referee: Damian Kos

3 October 2021 10	Raków Częstochowa	3–0	Warta Poznań	Częstochowa
12:30 CEST	Rundić 22'; Gutkovskis 45+2'; Niewulis 27'	Report		Stadium: Miejski Stadion Piłkarski „Raków” Attendance: 4,829; Referee: Tomasz Kwiatkowski

16 October 2021 11	Śląsk Wrocław	1–2	Raków Częstochowa	Wrocław
20:00 CET	Praszelik 75'	Report	Gutkovskis 64'; Ivi 69'	Stadium: Stadion Wrocław; Attendance: 13,198; Referee: Szymon Marciniak

23 October 2021 12	Raków Częstochowa	3–2	Bruk-Bet Termalica Nieciecza	Częstochowa
12:30 CEST	Tekijaški 6' (o.g.); Ivi 63'; Petrášek 78'	Report	Tekijaški 68'; Mešanović 90+5'	Stadium: Miejski Stadion Piłkarski „Raków” Referee: Sebastian Krasny

31 October 2021 13	Górnik Łęczna	0–0	Raków Częstochowa	Łęczna
15:00 CET		Report		Stadium: Stadion Górnik Łęczna; Attendance: 2,367; Referee: Krzysztof Jakubik

7 November 2021 14	Raków Częstochowa	0–0	Pogoń Szczecin	Częstochowa
15:00 CET		Report		Stadium: Miejski Stadion Piłkarski „Raków” Referee: Szymon Marciniak

27 November 2021 15	Raków Częstochowa	4–0	Zagłębie Lubin	Częstochowa
20:00 CET	Gutkovskis 28'; Ivi 47', 78'; Musiolik 90+1' (pen.)	Report	Pantić (red card) 62'	Stadium: Miejski Stadion Piłkarski „Raków” Referee: Sebastian Krasny

4 December 2021 16	Lechia Gdańsk	3–1	Raków Częstochowa	Gdańsk
19:00 CET	Durmuş 53', 75'; Paixão 86'		Lederman 16'	Stadium: Polsat Plus Arena Gdańsk; Attendance: 6,393; Referee: Tomasz Musiał

15 December 2021 5	Raków Częstochowa	1–2	Górnik Zabrze	Częstochowa
18:00 CET		Report		Stadium: Miejski Stadion Piłkarski „Raków”

19 March 2022 26	Raków Częstochowa	1–1	Legia Warsaw	Częstochowa
15:00 CET	Papanikolaou (yellow card) 26' (yellow-red card) 83'; Lederman (yellow card) 67'; Ivi 71' (pen.)	Report	Rosołek (yellow card) 24'; Wszołek 45'; Wieteska (yellow card) 57'; Lopes (yellow card) 90'	Stadium: Miejski Stadion Piłkarski "Raków"; Attendance: 5,200; Referee: Szymon Marciniak (Płock)

=== Polish Cup ===
22 September 2021 Round of 64	Stal Rzeszów	2–4	Raków Częstochowa	Rzeszów
19:15 CEST (UTC+02:00)	Marczuk 47'; Głowacki 51' (pen.)	Łączy nas piłka 90minut	Wdowiak 13'; Niewulis 45'; Ivi 84'; Gutkovskis 90'	Stadium: Stadion Miejski; Attendance: 4,021; Referee: Sebastian Krasny (Kraków)

26 October 2021 Round of 32	KKS Kalisz	1–2	Raków Częstochowa	Kalisz
18:00 CEST (UTC+02:00)	Waleńcik 85'	Łączy nas piłka 90minut	Gvilia 37' (pen.); Wdowiak 45+1'	Stadium: Stadion Miejski; Attendance: 2,950; Referee: Zbigniew Dobrynin (Łódź)

1 December 2021 Round of 16	Bruk-Bet Termalica Nieciecza	0–2	Raków Częstochowa	Nieciecza
14:30 CET (UTC+01:00)		[Łączy nas piłka] [90minut]		Stadium: Stadion Sportowy Bruk-Bet Termalica

1 March 2022 Quarter-final	Arka Gdynia	0–2	Raków Częstochowa	Gdynia
20:45 CET (UTC+01:00)		[Łączy nas piłka] [90minut]		Stadium: Stadion Miejski

6 April 2022 Semi-final	Raków Częstochowa	1–0	Legia Warsaw	Częstochowa
18:00 CEST (UTC+02:00)	Wdowiak 5'	Report		Stadium: Stadion Miejski; Attendance: 5,500; Referee: Tomasz Musiał (Kraków)

2 May 2022 Final	Lech Poznań	1–3	Raków Częstochowa	Warsaw
16:00 CEST (UTC+02:00)	Amaral 52'	Report	Gutkovskis 6'; Wdowiak 36'; Ivi 77'	Stadium: Stadion Narodowy; Attendance: 35,694; Referee: Szymon Marciniak (Płock)

=== Polish Super Cup ===
17 July 2021 Final	Legia Warsaw	1–1 (3–4 p)	Raków Częstochowa	Warsaw
20:00 CEST (UTC+02:00)	Emreli 90+3'	Report	Tudor 10'	Stadium: Stadion Wojska Polskiego; Attendance: 10,870; Referee: Damian Sylwestrzak (Wrocław)
	Penalties
	Pekhart (penalty scored); Kapustka (penalty missed); Emreli (penalty missed); Juranović (penalty scored); Mladenović (penalty scored)		Petrášek (penalty scored); Ivi López (penalty scored); Arsenić (penalty missed); Arak (penalty scored); Rundić (penalty scored)

=== UEFA Europa Conference League ===
==== Second qualifying round ====
22 July 2021 First leg	Sūduva (Lithuania)	0–0	(Poland) Raków Częstochowa	Sūduva Stadium, Marijampolė
19:00 (20:00 EEST)		Report		Attendance: 1,200; Referee: Ioannis Papadopoulos (Greece)

29 July 2021 Second leg	Raków Częstochowa (Poland)	0–0 (a.e.t.) (0–0 agg.) (4–3 p)	(Lithuania) Sūduva	BBOSiR Stadium, Bielsko-Biała (Note: Raków Częstochowa played their home match at BBOSiR stadium in Bielsko Biała, instead of their regular stadium Miejski Stadion Piłkarski "Raków", Częstochowa, which did not meet UEFA requirements.)
19:00		Report		Attendance: 3,917; Referee: Trustin Farrugia Cann (Malta)
	Penalties
	Ivi (penalty scored); Arak (penalty scored); Tudor (penalty scored); Poletanović (penalty scored)		(penalty scored) Gorobsov; (penalty scored) Makas; (penalty scored) Auzmendi; (penalty missed) Taravel; (penalty missed) Gargalatzidis

==== Third qualifying round ====
5 August 2021 First leg	Raków Częstochowa (Poland)	0–0	(Russia) Rubin Kazan	BBOSiR Stadium, Bielsko-Biała
21:00		Report		Attendance: 4,811; Referee: João Pinheiro (Portugal)

12 August 2021 Second leg	Rubin Kazan (Russia)	0–1 (a.e.t.) (0–1 agg.)	(Poland) Raków Częstochowa	Ak Bars Arena, Kazan
18:00 (19:00 MSK)		Report	Gutkovskis 111'	Attendance: 11,754; Referee: Tamás Bognár (Hungary)

==== Play-off round ====
19 August 2021 First leg	Raków Częstochowa (Poland)	1–0	(Belgium) Gent	Bielsko-Biała, Poland
18:00	Niewulis 64'	Report		Stadium: BBOSiR Stadium; Referee: Alejandro Hernández (Spain)

26 August 2021 Second leg	Gent (Belgium)	3–0 (3–1 agg.)	(Poland) Raków Częstochowa	Ghent, Belgium
20:00	Tissoudali 45+1'; Odjidja-Ofoe 70'; De Sart 72'	Report		Stadium: Ghelamco Arena; Referee: Aliyar Aghayev (Azerbaijan)

== Squad statistics ==
=== Goal scorers ===
As of 24 April 2022

Rank	Number	Position	Player	Ekstraklasa	Polish Cup	Polish Super Cup	UEFA Europa Conference League	Total
1	11	FW	(Spain) Ivi	18	1	0	0	19
2	21	FW	(Latvia) Vladislavs Gutkovskis	8	2	0	1	11
3	17	MF	(Poland) Mateusz Wdowiak	7	3	0	0	10
4	6	DF	(Poland) Andrzej Niewulis	2	1	0	1	4
4	9	FW	(Poland) Sebastian Musiolik	3	1	0	0	4
6	7	DF	(Croatia) Fran Tudor	2	0	1	0	3
6	77	MF	(Poland) Marcin Cebula	3	0	0	0	3
8	8	MF	(United States) Ben Lederman	1	1	0	0	2
9	2	DF	(Czech Republic) Tomáš Petrášek	1	0	0	0	1
9	3	DF	(Serbia) Milan Rundić	1	0	0	0	1
9	20	MF	(Serbia) Marko Poletanović	1	0	0	0	1
9	24	DF	(Croatia) Zoran Arsenić	1	0	0	0	1
9	29	MF	(Romania) Deian Sorescu	1	0	0	0	1
9	66	MF	(Greece) Giannis Papanikolaou	1	0	0	0	1
9	70	FW	(Portugal) Fábio Sturgeon	1	0	0	0	1
9	71	MF	(Poland) Wiktor Długosz	1	0	0	0	1
9	88	MF	(Georgia (country)) Valerian Gvilia	0	1	0	0	1
Own goals				1	0	0	0	1
Total				56	11	1	2	70

=== Clean sheets ===
As of 24 April 2022

Rank	Number	Position	Player	Ekstraklasa	Polish Cup	Polish Super Cup	UEFA Europa Conference League	Total
1	1	GK	(Bosnia and Herzegovina) Vladan Kovačević	10	0	0	5	15
2	12	GK	(Poland) Kacper Trelowski	3	3	0	0	6
Total				13	3	0	5	21
