= Vladan Kovačević =

Bosnian footballer (born 1998)

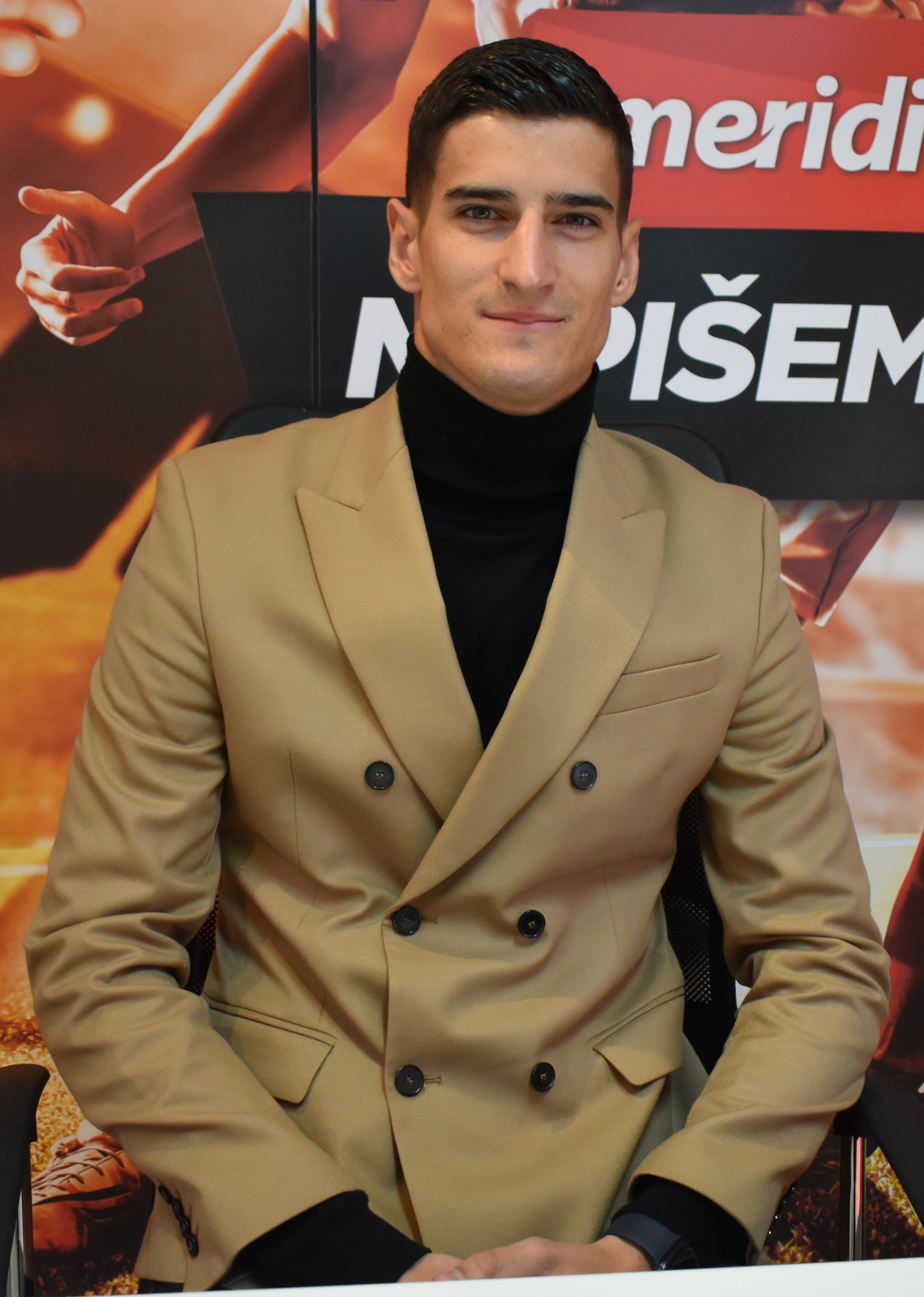
- Kovačević in 2021

Personal information
- Full name: Vladan Kovačević
- Date of birth: 11 April 1998 (age 28)
- Place of birth: Banja Luka, Bosnia and Herzegovina
- Height: 1.92 m (6 ft 4 in)
- Position: Goalkeeper

Team information
- Current team: Norwich City
- Number: 1

Youth career
- Željezničar Banja Luka
- 2014–2018: Sarajevo

Senior career*
| Years | Team | Apps | (Gls) |
| 2018–2021 | Sarajevo | 79 | (0) |
| 2018 | → Sloboda Mrkonjić Grad (loan) | 9 | (0) |
| 2021–2024 | Raków Częstochowa | 84 | (0) |
| 2024–2025 | Sporting CP | 6 | (0) |
| 2025 | → Legia Warsaw (loan) | 6 | (0) |
| 2025– | Norwich City | 47 | (0) |

International career
| 2018–2020 | Bosnia and Herzegovina U21 | 7 | (0) |
- * Club domestic league appearances and goals as of 12:10, 27 August 2026 (UTC)

Vladan Kovačević (Serbian Cyrillic: Владан Ковачевић, pronounced [ʋlǎdan koʋǎːtʃeʋitɕ]; born 11 April 1998) is a Bosnian professional footballer who plays as a goalkeeper for EFL Championship club Norwich City.

Kovačević started his professional career at Sarajevo, who loaned him to Sloboda Mrkonjić Grad in 2018.

== Club career ==
=== Sarajevo ===
Kovačević started playing football at his howetown club Željezničar Banja Luka, before joining Sarajevo's youth academy in 2014.

In February 2018, he was sent on a six-month loan to Sloboda Mrkonjić Grad. He made his professional debut against Kozara Gradiška on 17 March at the age of 19.

In August, Kovačević signed a new five-year deal with Sarajevo. On 5 August, he made his official debut for the team against Sloboda Tuzla. He won his first title with the club on 15 May 2019, by beating Široki Brijeg in Bosnian Cup final.

=== Raków Częstochowa ===
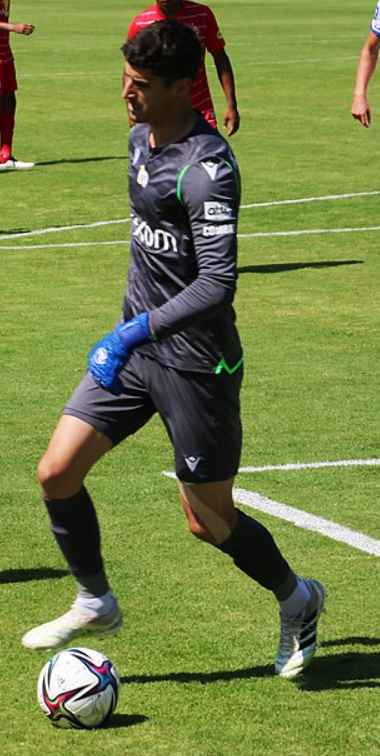
Kovačević with Raków Częstochowa

In June 2021, Kovačević was transferred to Polish outfit Raków Częstochowa for an undisclosed fee. He made his competitive debut for the club in 2021 Polish Super Cup game against Legia Warsaw on 17 July and managed to win his first trophy. A week later, he made his league debut against Piast Gliwice.

In July 2022, he extended his contract until June 2026.

=== Sporting CP ===
On 5 June 2024, reigning Primeira Liga champions Sporting CP announced the signing of Kovačević, for a reported fee of €6 million. He signed a five-year contract, with a buyout clause of €60 million. On 6 February 2025, he joined Ekstraklasa club Legia Warsaw on loan until the end of the season.

=== Norwich City ===
On 26 June 2025, Kovačević signed for EFL Championship club Norwich City for an undisclosed fee.

== International career ==
=== Youth ===
Kovačević was a member of Bosnia and Herzegovina under-21 team under coach Vinko Marinović.

=== Senior ===
In May 2019, he received his first senior Bosnia and Herzegovina call-up, for UEFA Euro 2020 qualifiers against Finland and Italy, but did not debut.

In February 2023, Kovačević accepted an invitation to the Serbia national team and was expected to make his debut in June. However, according to FIFA eligibility rules, Kovačević can only play for the Bosnia and Herzegovina national football team.

== Personal life ==
Kovačević is a Bosnian Serb. He married his long-time girlfriend Sofija in June 2022. Together they have three daughters.

== Career statistics ==
As of match played 22 August 2026

Appearances and goals by club, season and competition
| Club | Season | League | | | National cup (Note: Includes Bosnian Cup, Polish Cup, Taça de Portugal, FA Cup) | | League cup (Note: Includes Taça da Liga, EFL Cup) | | Europe | | Other | | Total | |
| Club | Season | Division | Apps | Goals | Apps | Goals | Apps | Goals | Apps | Goals | Apps | Goals | Apps | Goals |
|---|---|---|---|---|---|---|---|---|---|---|---|---|---|---|
| Sloboda Mrkonjić Grad (loan) | 2017–18 | First League of RS | 9 | 0 | — | | — | | — | | — | | 9 | 0 |
| Sarajevo | 2018–19 | Bosnian Premier League | 30 | 0 | 6 | 0 | — | | 0 | 0 | — | | 36 | 0 |
| Sarajevo | 2019–20 | Bosnian Premier League | 20 | 0 | 1 | 0 | — | | 4 (Note: Two appearances in UEFA Champions League, two appearances in UEFA Europa League) | 0 | — | | 25 | 0 |
| Sarajevo | 2020–21 | Bosnian Premier League | 29 | 0 | 4 | 0 | — | | 4 (Note: Two appearances in UEFA Champions League, two appearances in UEFA Europa League) | 0 | — | | 37 | 0 |
| Sarajevo | Total | | 79 | 0 | 11 | 0 | — | | 8 | 0 | — | | 98 | 0 |
| Raków Częstochowa | 2021–22 | Ekstraklasa | 27 | 0 | 0 | 0 | — | | 6 (Note: Appearances in UEFA Conference League) | 0 | 1 (Note: Appearance in Polish Super Cup) | 0 | 34 | 0 |
| Raków Częstochowa | 2022–23 | Ekstraklasa | 28 | 0 | 0 | 0 | — | | 3 | 0 | 1 | 0 | 32 | 0 |
| Raków Częstochowa | 2023–24 | Ekstraklasa | 29 | 0 | 3 | 0 | — | | 14 (Note: Eight appearances in UEFA Champions League, six appearances in UEFA Europa League) | 0 | 1 | 0 | 47 | 0 |
| Raków Częstochowa | Total | | 84 | 0 | 3 | 0 | — | | 23 | 0 | 3 | 0 | 113 | 0 |
| Sporting CP | 2024–25 | Primeira Liga | 6 | 0 | 2 | 0 | 1 | 0 | 0 | 0 | 1 (Note: Appearance in Supertaça Cândido de Oliveira) | 0 | 10 | 0 |
| Legia Warsaw (loan) | 2024–25 | Ekstraklasa | 6 | 0 | 1 | 0 | — | | 2 | 0 | — | | 9 | 0 |
| Norwich City | 2025–26 | EFL Championship | 45 | 0 | 1 | 0 | 0 | 0 | — | | — | | 46 | 0 |
| Norwich City | 2026–27 | EFL Championship | 2 | 0 | 0 | 0 | 1 | 0 | — | | — | | 1 | 0 |
| Norwich City | Total | | 47 | 0 | 1 | 0 | 1 | 0 | 0 | 0 | 0 | 0 | 49 | 0 |
| Career total | | | 231 | 0 | 18 | 0 | 2 | 0 | 33 | 0 | 4 | 0 | 288 | 0 |

== Honours ==
Sarajevo

- Bosnian Premier League: 2018–19, 2019–20
- Bosnian Cup: 2018–19, 2020–21

Raków Częstochowa

- Ekstraklasa: 2022–23
- Polish Cup: 2021–22
- Polish Super Cup: 2021, 2022

Legia Warsaw

- Polish Cup: 2024–25

Individual

- Ekstraklasa Goalkeeper of the Season: 2021–22, 2022–23
