= 2022–23 Polish Cup =

Fortuna Puchar Polski

Tournament details
- Country: Poland
- Dates: 26 July 2022 – 2 May 2023
- Teams: 69

Final positions
- Champions: Legia Warsaw (20th title)
- Runners-up: Raków Częstochowa
- Conference League: Legia Warsaw

Tournament statistics
- Matches played: 69
- Goals scored: 209 (3.03 per match)
- Top goal scorer(s): Néstor Gordillo (5 goals)

The 2022–23 Polish Cup was the 69th season of the annual Polish football knockout tournament. It began on 26 July 2022 with the first matches of the preliminary round and ended with the final on 2 May 2023. The 2022–23 edition of the Polish Cup was sponsored by Fortuna, making the official name Fortuna Puchar Polski. Winners of the competition qualified for the qualifying round of the 2023–24 UEFA Europa Conference League.

The defending champions were Raków Częstochowa. Legia Warsaw defeated Raków on penalties after a goalless draw in the final.

== Preliminary round ==
Team 1	Score	Team 2
26 July 2022
Ruch Chorzów (2)	2–0	Znicz Pruszków (3)
Motor Lublin (3)	4–2	Śląsk II Wrocław (3)
27 July 2022
GKS Jastrzębie (3)	4–1	Sokół Ostróda (4)
Stal Rzeszów (2)	1–0	Pogoń Grodzisk Mazowiecki (4)
Chojniczanka Chojnice (2)	3–1 (a.e.t.)	Hutnik Kraków (3)
Wigry Suwałki (5)	0–4	KKS 1925 Kalisz (3)
Radunia Stężyca (3)	3–2	Wisła Puławy (3)
Lech II Poznań (3)	2–3 (a.e.t.)	Pogoń Siedlce (3)
Garbarnia Kraków (3)	1–1 (a.e.t.) (2–3 p)	Olimpia Elbląg (3)
Górnik Polkowice (3)	3–0 (w/o)	GKS Bełchatów (5)

== First round ==
Team 1	Score	Team 2
30 August 2022
Start Jełowa (5)	0–4	Zagłębie Lubin (1)
Lechia Zielona Góra (4)	2–1 (a.e.t.)	Podbeskidzie Bielsko-Biała (2)
Stomil Olsztyn (3)	1–3	Chrobry Głogów (2)
Stal Rzeszów (2)	3–3 (a.e.t.) (6–7 p)	Korona Kielce (1)
Bałtyk Gdynia (4)	0–3	Olimpia Elbląg (3)
Stal Stalowa Wola (4)	1–2 (a.e.t.)	Puszcza Niepołomice (2)
GKS Wikielec (5)	1–2	Zagłębie Sosnowiec (2)
Legia II Warsaw (4)	0–5	Wisła Kraków (2)
RKS Radomsko (5)	0–3	Radomiak Radom (1)
Bruk-Bet Termalica Nieciecza (2)	2–3 (a.e.t.)	Legia Warsaw (1)
Rekord Bielsko-Biała (4)	3–0	Chełmianka Chełm (4)
31 August 2022
Pogoń Siedlce (3)	3–1	Chojniczanka Chojnice (2)
Wieczysta Kraków (4)	0–2	Radunia Stężyca (3)
Zawisza Bydgoszcz (4)	2–1	GKS Tychy (2)
Pogoń II Szczecin (4)	0–2	GKS Katowice (2)
Resovia (2)	1–0	Miedź Legnica (1)
Górnik Polkowice (3)	1–3 (a.e.t.)	Sandecja Nowy Sącz (2)
ŁKS Łódź (2)	2–2 (a.e.t.) (3–4 p)	Stal Mielec (1)
ŁKS Łagów (4)	1–3	Cracovia (1)
Skra Częstochowa (2)	1–3	Wisła Płock (1)
Ruch Wysokie Mazowieckie (5)	0–4	Śląsk Wrocław (1)
KKS 1925 Kalisz (3)	5–5 (a.e.t.) (4–3 p)	Widzew Łódź (1)
GKS Jastrzębie (3)	0–2	Warta Poznań (1)
Polonia Środa Wielkopolska (4)	0–2	Motor Lublin (3)
1 September 2022
Lechia Dzierżoniów (5)	1–2	Piast Gliwice (1)
Odra Opole (2)	0–1 (a.e.t.)	Jagiellonia Białystok (1)
Ruch Chorzów (2)	0–1	Górnik Zabrze (1)
Arka Gdynia (2)	0–0 (a.e.t.) (3–4 p)	Górnik Łęczna (2)

== Round of 32 ==
Team 1	Score	Team 2
12 October 2022
Lechia Zielona Góra (4)	3–1	Jagiellonia Białystok (1)
18 October 2022
Górnik Łęczna (2)	1–0	Korona Kielce (1)
KKS 1925 Kalisz (3)	2–0	Olimpia Elbląg (3)
Stal Mielec (1)	0–3 (a.e.t.)	Piast Gliwice (1)
Wisła Płock (1)	0–3	Legia Warsaw (1)
Zagłębie Sosnowiec (2)	0–1	Raków Częstochowa (1)
Rekord Bielsko-Biała (4)	3–3 (a.e.t.) (11–12 p)	Pogoń Szczecin (1)
19 October 2022
Wisła Kraków (2)	2–2 (a.e.t.) (6–5 p)	Puszcza Niepołomice (2)
Lech Poznań (1)	1–3	Śląsk Wrocław (1)
Resovia (2)	4–3	Cracovia (1)
Sandecja Nowy Sącz (2)	2–1	Warta Poznań (1)
Motor Lublin (3)	1–0 (a.e.t.)	Zagłębie Lubin (1)
Radunia Stężyca (3)	1–4	Lechia Gdańsk (1)
20 October 2022
Zawisza Bydgoszcz (4)	1–3	Radomiak Radom (1)
Pogoń Siedlce (3)	3–1	Chrobry Głogów (2)
GKS Katowice (2)	1–2	Górnik Zabrze (1)

== Round of 16 ==
Team 1	Score	Team 2
8 November 2022
KKS 1925 Kalisz (3)	3–3 (a.e.t.) (5–3 p)	Górnik Zabrze (1)
Górnik Łęczna (2)	1–0 (a.e.t.)	Piast Gliwice (1)
Lechia Gdańsk (1)	2–2 (a.e.t.) (2–4 p)	Legia Warsaw (1)
9 November 2022
Motor Lublin (3)	1–0	Wisła Kraków (2)
Pogoń Szczecin (1)	0–1	Raków Częstochowa (1)
Sandecja Nowy Sącz (2)	0–3 w/o	Śląsk Wrocław (1)
10 November 2022
Lechia Zielona Góra (4)	0–0 (a.e.t.) (3–1 p)	Radomiak Radom (1)
Pogoń Siedlce (3)	1–0	Resovia (2)

== Quarter-finals ==
Team 1	Score	Team 2
28 February 2023
Lechia Zielona Góra (4)	0–3	Legia Warsaw (1)
Pogoń Siedlce (3)	0–1	Górnik Łęczna (2)
1 March 2023
KKS 1925 Kalisz (3)	3–0	Śląsk Wrocław (1)
Motor Lublin (3)	0–3	Raków Częstochowa (1)

== Semi-finals ==
Team 1	Score	Team 2
4 April 2023
KKS 1925 Kalisz (3)	0–1	Legia Warsaw (1)
5 April 2023
Górnik Łęczna (2)	0–1	Raków Częstochowa (1)

== Final ==
2 May 2023
16:00 CEST (UTC+02:00)

Legia Warsaw	0–0 (a.e.t.)	Raków Częstochowa
	Report
Penalties
Slisz (penalty scored); Rosołek (penalty scored); Augustyniak (penalty scored); Sokołowski (penalty scored); Wszołek (penalty scored); Nawrocki (penalty scored)	6–5	(penalty scored) Tudor; (penalty scored) Svarnas; (penalty scored) Piasecki; (penalty scored) Nowak; (penalty scored) Jean Carlos; (penalty missed) Wdowiak

Stadion Narodowy, Warsaw
Attendance: 44,701
Referee: Piotr Lasyk (Bytom)
