= Ivi (footballer) =

Spanish footballer (born 1994)

Personal information
- Full name: Iván López Álvarez
- Date of birth: 29 June 1994 (age 32)
- Place of birth: Madrid, Spain
- Height: 1.74 m (5 ft 9 in)
- Position: Forward

Team information
- Current team: Iraklis
- Number: 11

Youth career
- Getafe

Senior career*
Years	Team	Apps	(Gls)
2013–2015	Getafe B	64	(11)
2014–2015	Getafe	9	(0)
2015–2017	Sevilla B	73	(23)
2017–2020	Levante	29	(4)
2018–2019	→ Valladolid (loan)	3	(0)
2019	→ Sporting Gijón (loan)	7	(0)
2019–2020	→ Huesca (loan)	7	(1)
2020	→ Ponferradina (loan)	14	(3)
2020–2026	Raków Częstochowa	135	(50)
2026–	Iraklis	7	(2)
- * Club domestic league appearances and goals as of 21:02, 25 October 2026 (UTC)

Iván López Álvarez (born 29 June 1994), commonly known as Ivi, is a Spanish professional footballer who plays as a forward for Super League Greece club Iraklis.

== Club career ==
=== Spain ===
Born in Madrid, Ivi finished his youth career with local Getafe. On 24 February 2013, still a junior, he made his senior debut, coming on as a late substitute for the reserves in a 2–0 home win against Zamora in the Segunda División B.

Ivi started the 2013–14 season still with the B team and in the third division, notably scoring twice in a 3–0 away victory over Real Unión. On 27 March 2014, he made his main squad and La Liga debut, replacing Pablo Sarabia for the final 20 minutes of an eventual 0–1 home loss to Villarreal.

On 16 June 2015, Ivi signed a three-year deal with another reserve team, Sevilla Atlético also in the third tier. On 8 October of the following year he scored his first professional goals, netting a brace in a 2–1 home defeat of Real Zaragoza.

On 7 August 2017, Ivi agreed to a four-year contract with top-flight club Levante for a reported fee of €1.5 million. He scored his first goal for them on 26 August, through a penalty kick in a 2–2 home draw against Deportivo de La Coruña, and repeated the feat on 9 September to help to a 1–1 draw at title holders Real Madrid.

Ivi was loaned to Real Valladolid in the same league on 27 July 2018, for one year. The following 31 January, he signed with Sporting de Gijón of division two also in a temporary deal.

On 13 August 2019, Ivi joined Huesca on loan for the second-tier season. He left the following 16 January, and moved to Ponferradina hours later also on loan.

=== Raków Częstochowa ===
Ivi terminated his contract with Levante on 28 August 2020, and joined Polish side Raków Częstochowa four days later. He helped them to win the Polish Cup in his first season, equalising the 2–1 final victory over Arka Gdynia.

On 17 July 2021, Ivi converted his attempt in Raków's penalty shootout victory against reigning Ekstraklasa champions Legia Warsaw in the Polish Super Cup. The following 2 May, he scored in the final of the domestic cup to help defeat Lech Poznań 3–1 and secure a second consecutive conquest of the tournament; he ended the campaign as the league's top scorer with 20 goals, being voted Footballer of the Year.

Ivi missed the vast majority of 2023–24, after suffering an anterior cruciate ligament injury in a preseason friendly against Puszcza Niepołomice on 27 June 2023. On 19 May 2026, it was announced that the 32-year-old would be released on 30 June; he made 172 total appearances during his spell, winning five major honours.

=== Iraklis ===
On 27 July 2026, Ivi signed for Super League Greece club Iraklis Thessaloniki.

== Career statistics ==
As of match played 23 May 2026

Appearances and goals by club, season and competition
Club	Season	League			National cup (Note: Includes Copa del Rey, Polish Cup)		Europe		Other		Total	
Club	Season	Division	Apps	Goals	Apps	Goals	Apps	Goals	Apps	Goals	Apps	Goals
Getafe	2013–14	La Liga	1	0	0	0	—		—		1	0
Getafe	2014–15	La Liga	8	0	1	0	—		—		9	0
Getafe	Total		9	0	1	0	—		—		10	0
Sevilla B	2015–16	Segunda División B	38	9	—		—		—		38	9
Sevilla B	2016–17	Segunda División	35	14	—		—		—		35	14
Sevilla B	Total		73	23	—		—		—		73	23
Levante	2017–18	La Liga	29	4	3	1	—		—		32	5
Valladolid (loan)	2018–19	La Liga	3	0	2	0	—		—		5	0
Sporting Gijón (loan)	2018–19	Segunda División	7	0	—		—		—		7	0
Huesca (loan)	2019–20	Segunda División	7	1	2	0	—		—		7	1
Ponferradina (loan)	2019–20	Segunda División	14	3	—		—		—		14	3
Raków Częstochowa	2020–21	Ekstraklasa	26	9	5	4	—		—		31	13
Raków Częstochowa	2021–22	Ekstraklasa	32	20	6	2	6 (Note: Appearances in UEFA Conference League)	0	1 (Note: Appearance in Polish Super Cup)	0	45	22
Raków Częstochowa	2022–23	Ekstraklasa	27	9	4	1	5	4	1	0	37	14
Raków Częstochowa	2023–24	Ekstraklasa	4	0	0	0	0	0	0	0	4	0
Raków Częstochowa	2024–25	Ekstraklasa	27	8	0	0	—		—		27	8
Raków Częstochowa	2025–26	Ekstraklasa	19	4	3	0	6	1	—		28	5
Raków Częstochowa	Total		135	50	18	7	17	5	2	0	172	62
Iraklis	2026–27	Super League Greece	0	0	0	0	—		—		0	0
Career total			277	81	26	8	17	5	2	0	322	94

== Honours ==
Huesca

- Segunda División: 2019–20

Raków Częstochowa

- Ekstraklasa: 2022–23
- Polish Cup: 2020–21, 2021–22
- Polish Super Cup: 2021, 2022

Individual

- Ekstraklasa Player of the Season: 2021–22
- Ekstraklasa top scorer: 2021–22
- Ekstraklasa Midfielder of the Season: 2021–22
- Ekstraklasa Player of the Month: October 2020, September 2021, April 2022, March 2023
