= Vladislavs Gutkovskis =

Latvian footballer (born 1995)

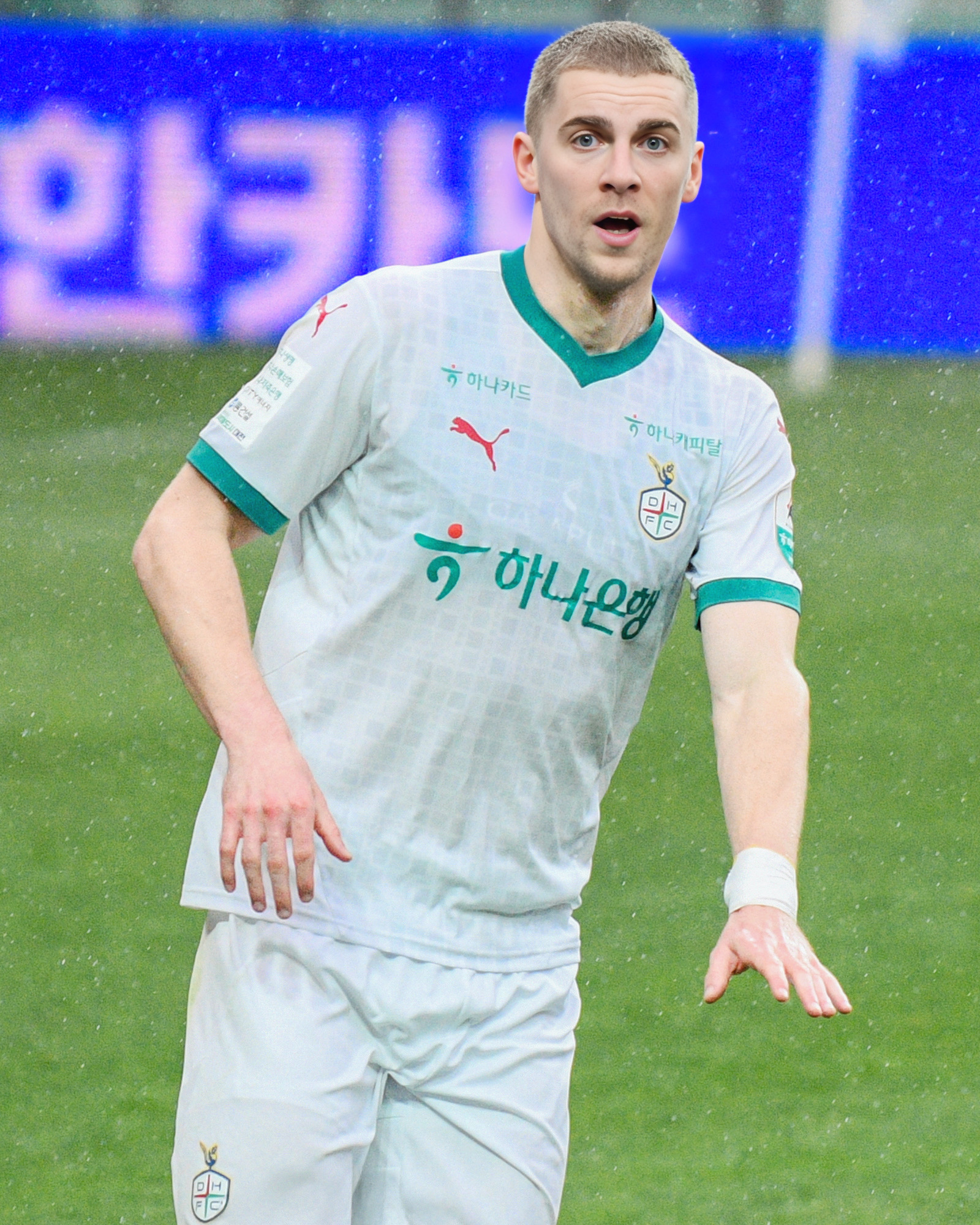
- Gutkovskis in 2025 with Daejeon Hana Citizen

Personal information
- Full name: Vladislavs Gutkovskis
- Date of birth: 2 April 1995 (age 31)
- Place of birth: Riga, Latvia
- Height: 1.88 m (6 ft 2 in)
- Position: Forward

Team information
- Current team: Arka Gdynia
- Number: 9

Senior career*
Years	Team	Apps	(Gls)
2011–2012	JFK Olimps	13	(0)
2013–2015	Skonto FC	64	(39)
2016–2020	Termalica Nieciecza	108	(32)
2020–2023	Raków Częstochowa	90	(24)
2023–2025	Daejeon Hana Citizen	31	(6)
2026–	Arka Gdynia	30	(12)

International career^{‡}
2013	Latvia U19	3	(1)
2014–2016	Latvia U21	9	(4)
2016–	Latvia	67	(14)
- * Club domestic league appearances and goals as of 15:13, 9 November 2026 (UTC) ‡ National team caps and goals as of 17:43, 15 November 2026 (UTC)

Vladislavs Gutkovskis (born 2 April 1995) is a Latvian professional footballer who plays as a forward for I liga club Arka Gdynia, which he captains, and the Latvia national team.

== Club career ==
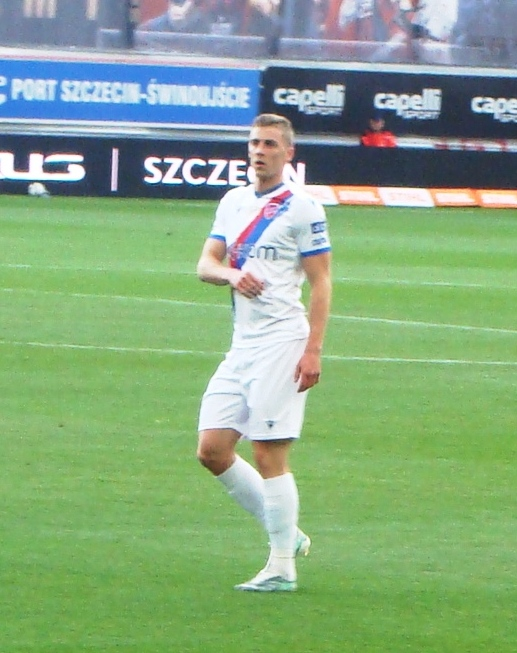
Gutkovskis playing for Raków Częstochowa in 2021

Gutkovskis started his career with JFK Olimps in his home country of Latvia. He made 13 first-team appearances for the club before joining fellow Latvian side Skonto FC a year later. For the first team, Gutkovskis played 73 times, scored 45 goals, and assisted eight times, before moving to Termalica Nieciecza in Poland in 2016. He made 112 appearances for the club, scored 33 and assisted six over a four-year spell before joining Polish club Raków Częstochowa in 2020. With the latter, he won the Polish league title in 2023 and two Polish Cups, including the 2022 Polish Cup final where he scored the opening goal in a 3–1 win against Lech Poznan on 2 May 2022.

On 11 July 2023, Gutkovskis joined the K League 1 club Daejeon Hana Citizen on a permanent deal. He was given the number 99 jersey. He made his K League debut for the club on 16 July 2023 in a 2–0 defeat away against Incheon United. He scored his first K League goal for the club on 1 March 2024, in a 1–1 draw away against Jeonbuk Motors.

On 18 December 2025, Gutkovskis signed with Polish Ekstraklasa club Arka Gdynia on an eighteen-month contract as a free agent.

== International career ==
Gutkovskis got his first call up to the senior Latvia side for 2018 FIFA World Cup qualifiers against Faroe Islands and Hungary in October 2016. He scored his first senior international goal for Latvia in a 3–0 away win against San Marino on 11 November 2020 in a friendly.

== Career statistics ==
=== Club ===
As of match played 7 November 2026

Appearances and goals by club, season and competition
Club	Season	League			National cup (Note: Includes Latvian Cup, Polish Cup, Korean FA Cup)		Continental		Other		Total	
Club	Season	Division	Apps	Goals	Apps	Goals	Apps	Goals	Apps	Goals	Apps	Goals
JFK Olimps	2011	Latvian Higher League	13	0	0	0	—		2	0	15	0
Skonto FC	2013	Latvian Higher League	7	1	0	0	—		—		7	1
Skonto FC	2014	Latvian Higher League	34	28	3	1	0	0	—		37	29
Skonto FC	2015	Latvian Higher League	23	10	2	1	4 (Note: Appearances in UEFA Europa League)	2	—		29	13
Skonto FC	Total		64	39	5	2	4	2	0	0	73	43
Bruk-Bet Termalica	2015–16	Ekstraklasa	7	0	0	0	—		—		7	0
Bruk-Bet Termalica	2016–17	Ekstraklasa	31	8	1	0	—		—		32	8
Bruk-Bet Termalica	2017–18	Ekstraklasa	20	3	2	1	—		—		22	4
Bruk-Bet Termalica	2018–19	I liga	25	9	0	0	—		—		25	9
Bruk-Bet Termalica	2019–20	I liga	25	12	1	0	—		—		26	12
Bruk-Bet Termalica	Total		108	32	4	1	0	0	0	0	112	33
Raków Częstochowa	2020–21	Ekstraklasa	29	7	6	5	—		—		35	12
Raków Częstochowa	2021–22	Ekstraklasa	29	9	6	3	6 (Note: Appearances in UEFA Europa Conference League)	1	0	0	41	13
Raków Częstochowa	2022–23	Ekstraklasa	32	8	4	0	6	1	1 (Note: Appearance in Polish Super Cup)	0	43	9
Raków Częstochowa	Total		90	24	16	8	12	2	1	0	119	34
Daejeon Hana Citizen	2023	K League 1	3	0	—		—		—		3	0
Daejeon Hana Citizen	2024	K League 1	10	2	0	0	—		—		10	2
Daejeon Hana Citizen	2025	K League 1	18	4	1	0	—		—		19	4
Daejeon Hana Citizen	Total		31	6	1	0	0	0	0	0	32	6
Arka Gdynia	2025–26	Ekstraklasa	16	4	—		—		—		16	4
Arka Gdynia	2026–27	I liga	14	8	1	0	—		—		15	8
Arka Gdynia	Total		30	12	1	0	—		—		31	12
Career total			336	113	27	11	16	4	3	0	382	128

=== International ===
Scores and results list Latvia's goal tally first, score column indicates score after each Gutkovskis goal.

List of international goals scored by Vladislavs Gutkovskis
No.	Date	Venue	Opponent	Score	Result	Competition
1	11 November 2020	San Marino Stadium, Serravalle, San Marino	San Marino	3–0	3–0	Friendly
2	17 November 2020	Estadi Nacional, Andorra la Vella, Andorra	Andorra	4–0	5–0	2020–21 UEFA Nations League D
3	1 September 2021	Daugava Stadium, Riga, Latvia	Gibraltar	1–0	3–1	2022 FIFA World Cup qualification
4	1 September 2021	Daugava Stadium, Riga, Latvia	Gibraltar	2–1	3–1	2022 FIFA World Cup qualification
5	16 November 2021	Victoria Stadium, Gibraltar	Gibraltar	1–1	3–1	2022 FIFA World Cup qualification
6	29 March 2022	National Stadium, Ta' Qali, Ta'Qali, Malta	Azerbaijan	1–0	1–0	Friendly
7	10 June 2022	Zimbru Stadium, Chișinău, Moldova	Moldova	1–1	4–2	2022–23 UEFA Nations League D
8	10 June 2022	Zimbru Stadium, Chișinău, Moldova	Moldova	3–1	4–2	2022–23 UEFA Nations League D
9	14 June 2022	Rheinpark Stadion, Vaduz, Liechtenstein	Liechtenstein	1–0	2–0	2022–23 UEFA Nations League D
10	14 June 2022	Rheinpark Stadion, Vaduz, Liechtenstein	Liechtenstein	2–0	2–0	2022–23 UEFA Nations League D
11	25 September 2022	Estadi Nacional, Andorra la Vella, Andorra	Andorra	0–1	1–1	2022–23 UEFA Nations League D
12	11 October 2025	Daugava Stadium, Riga, Latvia	Andorra	2–1	2–2	2026 FIFA World Cup qualification
13	16 November 2025	Dubočica Stadium, Leskovac, Serbia	Serbia	1–0	1–2	2026 FIFA World Cup qualification
14	26 March 2026	Europa Sports Park, Europa Point, Gibraltar	Gibraltar	1–0	1–0	2024–25 UEFA Nations League promotion/relegation play-offs

== Honours ==
Skonto FC

- Latvian Football Cup runner-up: 2013–14
- Latvian Supercup runner-up: 2013

Raków Częstochowa

- Ekstraklasa: 2022–23
- Polish Cup: 2020–21, 2021–22
- Polish Super Cup: 2022

Individual

- Latvian Footballer of the Year: 2021, 2022
- Latvian Higher League top scorer: 2014
- Polish Cup top scorer: 2020–21
- Ekstraklasa Player of the Month: November 2022
