= Deian Sorescu =

Romanian footballer (born 1997)

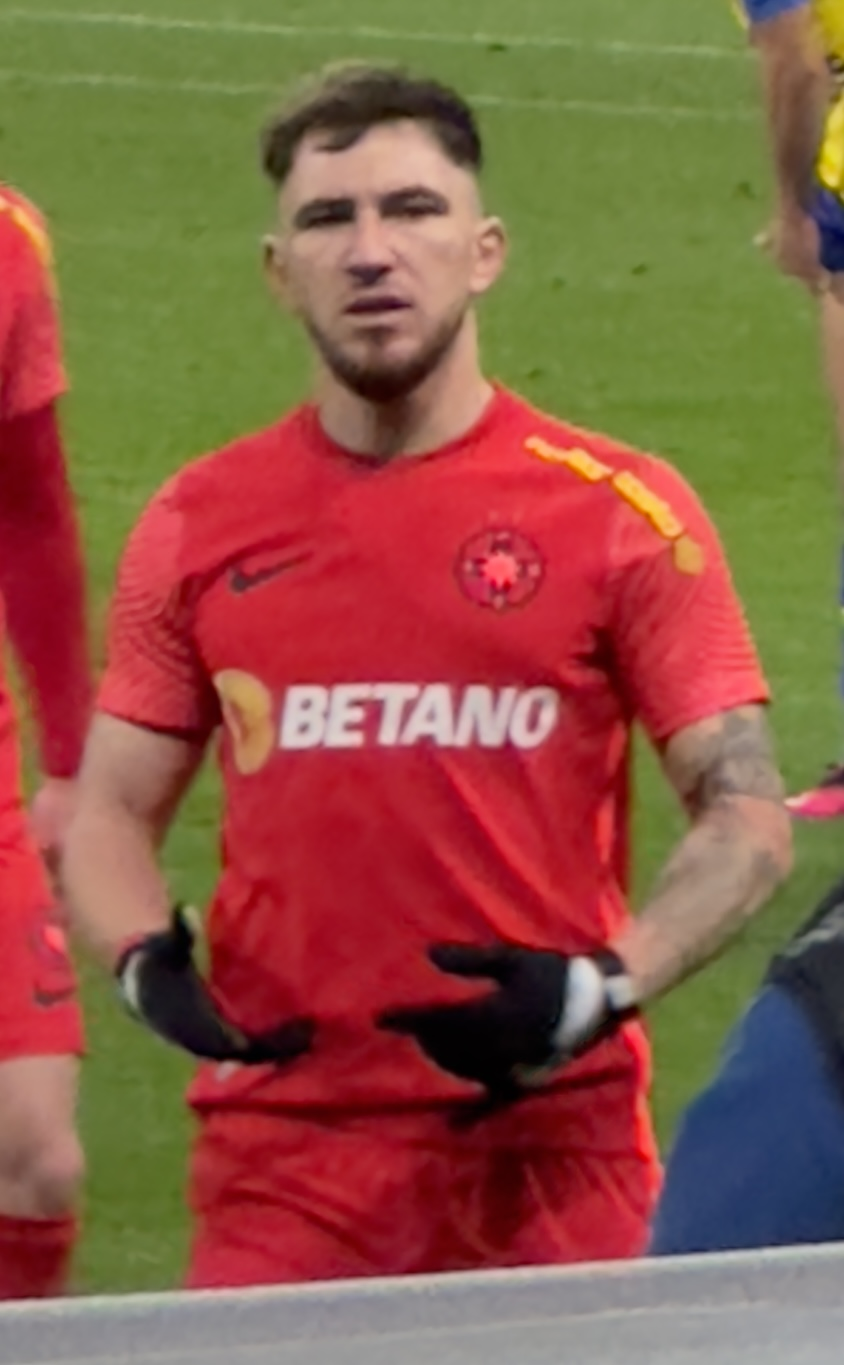
- Sorescu with FCSB in 2023

Personal information
- Full name: Deian Cristian Sorescu
- Date of birth: 29 August 1997 (age 29)
- Place of birth: Moldova Nouă, Romania
- Height: 1.75 m (5 ft 9 in)
- Positions: Winger; full-back

Team information
- Current team: Gaziantep
- Number: 18

Youth career
- 2005–2008: Dunărea Moldova Nouă
- 2008–2012: Politehnica Timișoara
- 2008–2009: → Electrica Timișoara (loan)
- 2012–2014: ACS Poli Timișoara

Senior career*
Years	Team	Apps	(Gls)
2014–2016	ACS Poli Timișoara	8	(1)
2014–2015	→ Millennium Giarmata (loan)	12	(1)
2017–2018	ASU Politehnica Timișoara	38	(14)
2018–2022	Dinamo București	123	(27)
2022–2024	Raków Częstochowa	31	(4)
2023	→ FCSB (loan)	18	(2)
2024	→ Gaziantep (loan)	16	(4)
2024–	Gaziantep	68	(10)

International career^{‡}
2019	Romania U21	2	(0)
2021–	Romania	25	(0)
- * Club domestic league appearances and goals as of 25 October 2026 ‡ National team caps and goals as of 6 June 2026

Deian Cristian Sorescu (Romanian pronunciation: [ˈdejan kristiˈan soˈresku]; born 29 August 1997) is a Romanian professional footballer who plays as a winger or a full-back for Süper Lig club Gaziantep and the Romania national team.

A youth player of Politehnica Timișoara until its dissolution in 2012, he started his senior career with the two entities which asserted the history of the defunct team. In 2018, Sorescu left the latter to sign for Dinamo București, amassing over 120 matches in the top flight before moving abroad to Raków Częstochowa four years later. He won three domestic trophies in Poland, and in the 2023 winter transfer window returned to Romania on loan to Dinamo's city rivals FCSB. In 2024, Sorescu moved to Turkish side Gaziantep, initially on loan, before joining them permanently in August that year.

Internationally, Sorescu earned his first cap for the Romania senior team in a 1–2 friendly loss to Georgia in June 2021. He was selected in the squad for the UEFA Euro 2024, where they managed to win their group and reach the round of 16.

== Club career ==
=== Early career and ACS Poli Timișoara ===
Born in Moldova Nouă, Caraș-Severin County, Sorescu played football for local club Dunărea Moldova Nouă before joining the youth setup of FC Politehnica Timișoara, aged ten. After the dissolution of FC Politehnica, he moved to newly-founded ACS Poli Timișoara in 2012. At age 16, Sorescu was loaned out to Romanian third division team Millenium Giarmata, after which he became part of the extended roster for the ACS Poli senior team.

On 30 May 2015, Sorescu made his debut for the Alb-violeții in a 1–1 Liga II draw with Olimpia Satu Mare. Towards the end of the following season, he played his maiden minutes in the first league in games against Petrolul Ploiești and CSM Studențesc Iași; both ended in 2–3 defeats.

=== ASU Politehnica Timișoara ===
At the start of 2017, Sorescu moved to ASU Politehnica Timișoara, the other team in the city established after the dissolution of the original FC Politehnica. He made his breakthrough in the 2017–18 Liga II campaign, amassing 14 goals and 35 matches in all competitions.

=== Dinamo București ===
Liga I club Dinamo București signed Sorescu on a four-year contract on 27 April 2018. He registered his debut for "the Red Dogs" on 22 July that year, and also scored the winner in the 2–1 home league victory over Voluntari. With eleven goals in all competitions, Sorescu was Dinamo București's top scorer in the 2019–20 season.

He repeated the performance the next year, this time after netting only eight goals, and was chosen by Liga Profesionistă de Fotbal in the 2020–21 Liga I Team of the Season. On 19 July 2021, Sorescu scored a hat-trick in the campaign's opener against Voluntari, with the game ending in a 3–2 win. During that summer, he was subject to offers from Legia Warsaw and Dinamo's city rivals FCSB.

=== Raków Częstochowa ===
On 19 January 2022, Dinamo București announced the transfer of Sorescu to Raków Częstochowa, and two days later the Polish team confirmed the signing of a three-and-a-half-year deal. He registered his Ekstraklasa debut on 12 February, in a 1–0 away victory over Radomiak Radom. On 2 May that year, he won his first career trophy after starting in a 3–1 defeat of Lech Poznań in the Polish Cup final.

Sorescu made his European debut on 21 July 2022, starting in an eventual 5–0 home thrashing of Astana in the UEFA Europa Conference League second qualifying round; he was sent-off in the 21st minute after receiving a second yellow card.

==== Loan to FCSB ====
On 14 January 2023, Sorescu rejoined the Romanian league by signing for FCSB on loan until the end of the season. He made his debut for the Roș-albaștrii eight days later, in a 1–0 away win over Hermannstadt, and scored his first goal in a 2–1 victory against Argeș Pitești on 26 February.

On 25 May, after his club mathematically finished second in the Liga I, FCSB owner Gigi Becali publicly stated that he would not activate Sorescu's €900,000 permanent transfer clause.

=== Gaziantep ===
On 18 January 2024, Sorescu moved to Turkish Süper Lig club Gaziantep on loan for the remainder of the campaign, joining several compatriots including manager Marius Șumudică. He played 16 league games and scored four goals during his initial stint, of which one in a 2–0 home win over Beşiktaş on 11 March.

On 10 August 2024, Gaziantep announced the permanent signing of Sorescu on a three-year deal.

== International career ==
Sorescu made his debut for the Romania national team on 2 June 2021, in a friendly match with Georgia at the Ilie Oană Stadium in Ploiești. He started as a right-back and provided an assist to Andrei Ivan in the 2–1 loss.

On 7 June 2024, Sorescu was selected in the squad for the UEFA Euro 2024. He made two appearances as a substitute in the group stage, where Romania finished at the top but went on to lose to the Netherlands in the round of 16.

== Career statistics ==
=== Club ===
As of match played 25 October 2026

Appearances and goals by club, season and competition
Club	Season	League			National cup (Note: Includes Cupa României, Polish Cup, Turkish Cup)		League cup (Note: Includes Cupa Ligii)		Continental		Other		Total	
Club	Season	Division	Apps	Goals	Apps	Goals	Apps	Goals	Apps	Goals	Apps	Goals	Apps	Goals
ACS Poli Timișoara	2014–15	Liga II	1	0	—		—		—		—		1	0
ACS Poli Timișoara	2015–16	Liga I	2	1	1	0	0	0	—		—		3	1
ACS Poli Timișoara	2016–17	Liga I	5	0	0	0	1	0	—		—		6	0
ACS Poli Timișoara	Total		8	1	1	0	1	0	—		—		10	1
Millenium Giarmata (loan)	2014–15	Liga III	12	1	—		—		—		—		12	1
ASU Politehnica Timișoara	2016–17	Liga II	4	0	—		—		—		—		4	0
ASU Politehnica Timișoara	2017–18	Liga II	34	14	1	0	—		—		—		35	14
ASU Politehnica Timișoara	Total		38	14	1	0	—		—		—		39	14
Dinamo București	2018–19	Liga I	35	2	1	0	—		—		—		36	2
Dinamo București	2019–20	Liga I	32	10	5	1	—		—		—		37	11
Dinamo București	2020–21	Liga I	37	7	5	1	—		—		—		42	8
Dinamo București	2021–22	Liga I	19	8	1	0	—		—		—		20	8
Dinamo București	Total		123	27	12	2	—		—		—		135	29
Raków Częstochowa	2021–22	Ekstraklasa	9	1	3	0	—		—		—		12	1
Raków Częstochowa	2022–23	Ekstraklasa	11	2	2	0	—		2 (Note: Appearances in UEFA Europa Conference League)	0	0	0	15	2
Raków Częstochowa	2023–24	Ekstraklasa	11	1	1	0	—		11 (Note: Eight appearances in UEFA Champions League, three appearances in UEFA Europa League)	0	1 (Note: Appearance in Polish Super Cup)	0	24	1
Raków Częstochowa	Total		31	4	6	0	—		13	0	1	0	51	4
FCSB (loan)	2022–23	Liga I	18	2	—		—		—		—		18	2
Gaziantep (loan)	2023–24	Süper Lig	16	4	1	0	—		—		—		17	4
Gaziantep	2024–25	Süper Lig	34	5	2	0	—		—		—		36	5
Gaziantep	2025–26	Süper Lig	25	3	4	2	—		—		—		29	5
Gaziantep	2026–27	Süper Lig	9	2	0	0	—		—		—		9	2
Gaziantep	Total		84	14	7	2	—		—		—		91	16
Career total			314	63	27	4	1	0	13	0	1	0	356	67

=== International ===
As of match played 6 June 2026

Appearances and goals by national team and year
National team	Year	Apps	Goals
Romania	2021	5	0
Romania	2022	4	0
Romania	2023	5	0
Romania	2024	6	0
Romania	2025	3	0
Romania	2026	2	0
Total		25	0

== Honours ==
Raków Częstochowa

- Ekstraklasa: 2022–23
- Polish Cup: 2021–22
- Polish Super Cup: 2022

Individual

- Liga I Team of the Season: 2020–21
