= Wiktor Długosz =

Polish professional footballer (born 2000)

Personal information
- Date of birth: 1 July 2000 (age 26)
- Place of birth: Kielce, Poland
- Height: 1.83 m (6 ft 0 in)
- Position: Right winger

Team information
- Current team: Korona Kielce
- Number: 71

Youth career
- 2011–2018: Korona Kielce

Senior career*
Years	Team	Apps	(Gls)
2018–2021	Korona Kielce	20	(1)
2019–2020	→ Warta Poznań (loan)	7	(1)
2021–2024	Raków Częstochowa	41	(1)
2023–2024	→ Ruch Chorzów (loan)	11	(0)
2024–	Korona Kielce	57	(6)

International career
2018	Poland U19	1	(0)
2021–2022	Poland U21	3	(0)
- * Club domestic league appearances and goals as of 21:24, 29 May 2026 (UTC)

Wiktor Długosz (born 1 July 2000) is a Polish professional footballer who plays as a right winger for Ekstraklasa club Korona Kielce.

== Career statistics ==
As of match played 8 May 2026

Appearances and goals by club, season and competition
Club	Season	League			Polish Cup		Europe		Other		Total	
Club	Season	Division	Apps	Goals	Apps	Goals	Apps	Goals	Apps	Goals	Apps	Goals
Korona Kielce	2017–18	Ekstraklasa	1	0	0	0	—		—		1	0
Korona Kielce	2019–20	Ekstraklasa	3	0	0	0	—		—		3	0
Korona Kielce	2020–21	I liga	16	1	2	0	—		—		18	1
Korona Kielce	Total		20	1	2	0	—		—		22	1
Warta Poznań (loan)	2019–20	I liga	7	1	0	0	—		—		7	1
Raków Częstochowa	2020–21	Ekstraklasa	6	0	1	0	—		—		7	0
Raków Częstochowa	2021–22	Ekstraklasa	17	1	4	0	5 (Note: Appearances in UEFA Europa Conference League)	0	0	0	26	1
Raków Częstochowa	2022–23	Ekstraklasa	18	0	2	0	3	0	1 (Note: Appearance in Polish Super Cup)	0	24	0
Raków Częstochowa	Total		41	1	7	0	8	0	1	0	57	1
Ruch Chorzów (loan)	2023–24	Ekstraklasa	11	0	1	0	—		—		12	0
Korona Kielce	2024–25	Ekstraklasa	31	3	3	0	—		—		34	3
Korona Kielce	2025–26	Ekstraklasa	26	3	2	0	—		—		28	3
Korona Kielce	Total		57	6	5	0	—		—		62	6
Career total			136	9	15	0	8	0	1	0	160	9

== Honours ==
Korona Kielce II

- IV liga Świętokrzyskie: 2018–19

Raków Częstochowa

- Ekstraklasa: 2022–23
- Polish Cup: 2020–21, 2021–22
- Polish Super Cup: 2022

Raków Częstochowa II

- IV liga Silesia I: 2021–22
