= Sebastian Musiolik =

Polish footballer

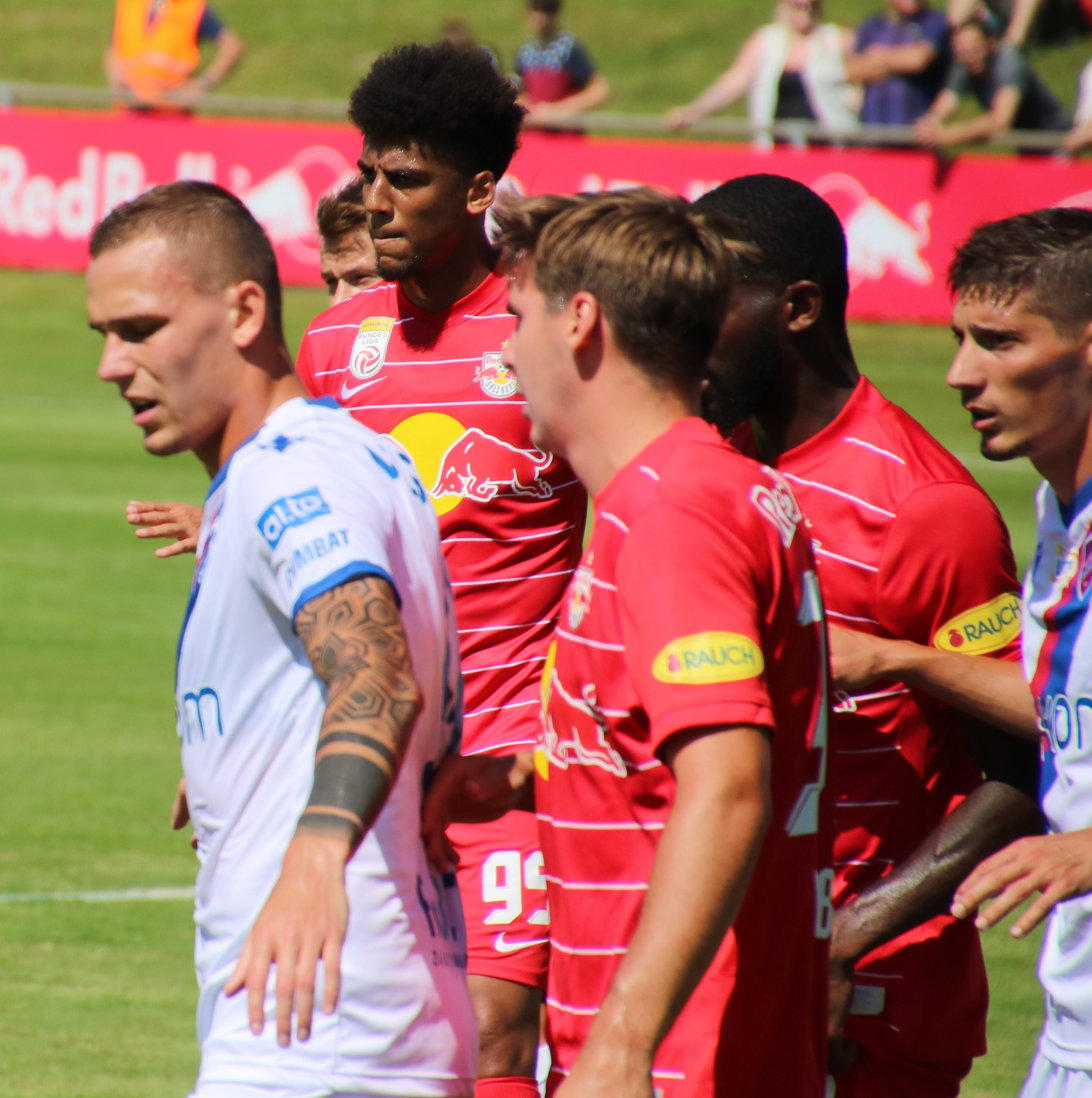
- Musiolik (most left) with Raków Częstochowa in 2021

Personal information
- Date of birth: 19 May 1996 (age 30)
- Place of birth: Knurów, Poland
- Height: 1.93 m (6 ft 4 in)
- Position: Striker

Team information
- Current team: Stal Mielec
- Number: 70

Youth career
- 2003–2007: Piast Leszczyny
- 2007–2009: Górnik Czerwionka
- 2009–2011: RKP Rybnik
- 2011–2012: ROW 1964 Rybnik

Senior career*
Years	Team	Apps	(Gls)
2013–2015	ROW 1964 Rybnik	32	(5)
2015–2017	Piast Gliwice	5	(0)
2016	→ ROW 1964 Rybnik (loan)	13	(0)
2017	→ ROW 1964 Rybnik (loan)	14	(4)
2017–2018	ROW 1964 Rybnik	29	(7)
2018–2023	Raków Częstochowa	112	(16)
2020–2021	→ Pordenone (loan)	31	(6)
2023–2024	Górnik Zabrze	33	(4)
2024–2025	Śląsk Wrocław	20	(3)
2025–2026	A.E. Kifisia	8	(1)
2026–	Stal Mielec	2	(0)

International career
2015	Poland U19	4	(0)
2015	Poland U20	1	(0)
- * Club domestic league appearances and goals as of 22:00, 29 August 2026 (UTC)

Sebastian Musiolik (born 19 May 1996) is a Polish professional footballer who plays as a striker for I liga club Stal Mielec.

== Career ==
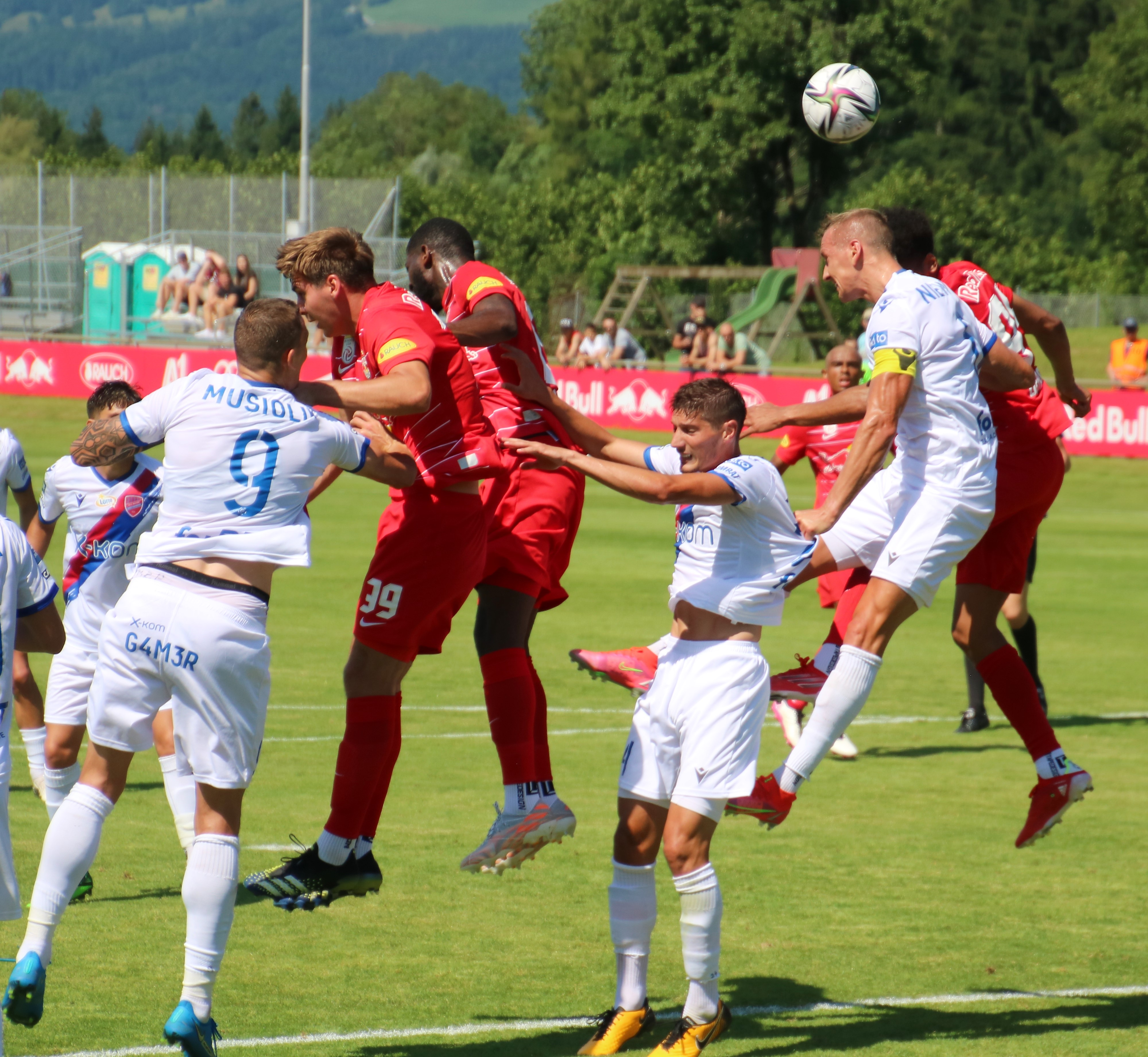
Musiolik (with number 9) in action during a friendly match

On 1 October 2020, Musiolik joined Italian Serie B club Pordenone on loan.

== Honours ==
ROW Rybnik

- II liga West: 2012–13

Raków Częstochowa

- Ekstraklasa: 2022–23
- Polish Cup: 2020–21, 2021–22
- Polish Super Cup: 2021, 2022
- I liga: 2018–19
