= Przemysław Oziębała =

Polish footballer (born 1986)

Personal information
- Full name: Przemysław Oziębała
- Date of birth: 24 August 1986 (age 40)
- Place of birth: Koziegłowy, Poland
- Height: 1.80 m (5 ft 11 in)
- Positions: Right winger; forward

Team information
- Current team: Raków Częstochowa U19 (manager)

Senior career*
Years	Team	Apps	(Gls)
2003–2006	Zieloni Żarki		
2007	Zagłębie Sosnowiec	13	(1)
2008–2012	Widzew Łódź	91	(19)
2012–2015	Górnik Zabrze	32	(2)
2015	→ Siarka Tarnobrzeg (loan)	10	(1)
2015–2016	Stal Stalowa Wola	24	(3)
2016–2018	Raków Częstochowa	41	(10)
2018–2020	Gwarek Tarnowskie Góry	37	(10)
2020	Raków Częstochowa	6	(0)
2020–2023	Raków Częstochowa II	62	(20)

Managerial career
- 2020–2023: Raków Częstochowa II (assistant)
- 2023–2025: Raków Częstochowa II
- 2025: Raków Częstochowa (assistant)
- 2025–: Raków Częstochowa U19
- * Club domestic league appearances and goals

Przemysław Oziębała (born 24 August 1986) is a Polish professional football manager and former player who is currently in charge of Raków Częstochowa's under-19 team.

== Career ==
In February 2007, he moved to Zagłębie Sosnowiec. In the winter of 2008, he joined Widzew Łódź on a five-year deal.

In July 2012, he signed a three-year deal with Górnik Zabrze.

== Managerial statistics ==
As of match played 30 November 2024

Managerial record by team and tenure
Team	From	To	Record							
Team	From	To	G	W	D	L	GF	GA	GD	Win %
Raków Częstochowa II	6 November 2023	2 January 2025	40	20	8	12	85	69	+16	50.00
Career total			40	20	8	12	85	69	+16	50.00

== Honours ==
Widzew Łódź

- I liga: 2008–09, 2009–10

Górnik Zabrze II

- Polish Cup (Zabrze regionals): 2013–14

Raków Częstochowa

- II liga: 2016–17

Raków Częstochowa II

- IV liga Silesia I: 2020–21, 2021–22
- Polish Cup (Częstochowa regionals): 2021–22
