= Piotr Malinowski =

Polish footballer (born 1984)

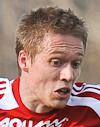

Personal information
- Full name: Piotr Malinowski
- Date of birth: 25 March 1984 (age 42)
- Place of birth: Częstochowa, Poland
- Height: 1.70 m (5 ft 7 in)
- Position: Midfielder

Team information
- Current team: Warta Poraj; Raków Częstochowa II (match analyst)
- Number: 13

Youth career
- Beniaminek Częstochowa
- Raków Częstochowa

Senior career*
Years	Team	Apps	(Gls)
2002–2007	Raków Częstochowa		
2007–2008	Górnik Zabrze	30	(0)
2009–2015	Podbeskidzie Bielsko-Biała	161	(9)
2015–2021	Raków Częstochowa	162	(17)
2021–2025	Raków Częstochowa II	78	(12)
2026–	Warta Poraj	8	(3)
- * Club domestic league appearances and goals as of 13:17, 30 August 2026 (UTC)

Piotr Malinowski (born 25 March 1984) is a Polish professional footballer who plays as a midfielder for Warta Poraj. He currently works as a match analyst for Raków Częstochowa II.

== Honours ==
Raków Częstochowa

- I liga: 2018–19
- II liga: 2016–17
- IV liga Silesia I: 2004–05
- Polish Cup: 2020–21

Raków Częstochowa II

- IV liga Silesia I: 2021–22
