= Fran Tudor =

Croatian footballer (born 1995)

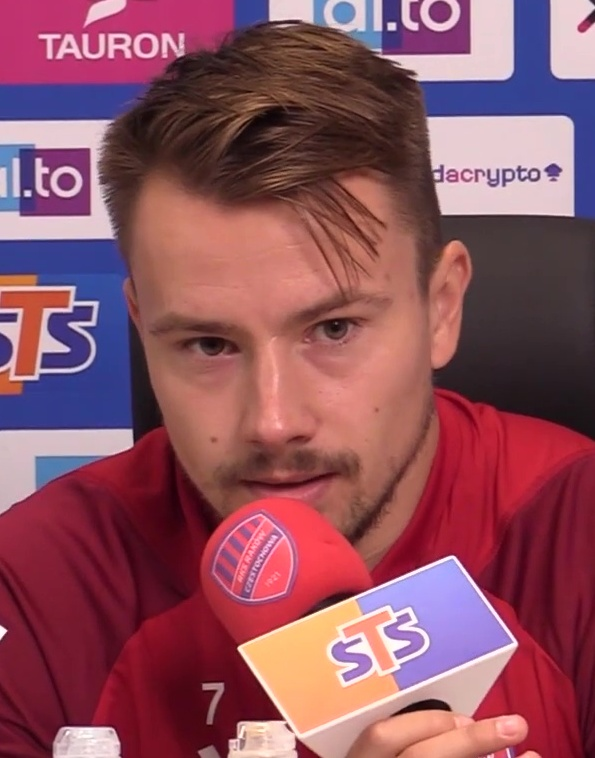
- Tudor in 2023 with Raków Częstochowa

Personal information
- Date of birth: 27 September 1995 (age 31)
- Place of birth: Zagreb, Croatia
- Height: 1.73 m (5 ft 8 in)
- Positions: Centre-back; right-back; right wing-back

Team information
- Current team: Raków Częstochowa
- Number: 7

Youth career
- 2004–2005: Mladost Buzin
- 2005–2007: Dinamo Zagreb
- 2007–2013: NK Zagreb
- 2014: Panathinaikos

Senior career*
Years	Team	Apps	(Gls)
2015–2019	Hajduk Split	109	(15)
2015	→ Hajduk Split B	8	(0)
2020–	Raków Częstochowa	187	(6)

International career
2013	Croatia U19	2	(0)
2015–2016	Croatia U21	7	(0)
2017	Croatia	3	(1)
- * Club domestic league appearances and goals as of 22:15, 28 August 2026 (UTC)

Fran Tudor (Croatian pronunciation: [frân tûdor]; born 27 September 1995) is a Croatian professional footballer who plays as a centre-back, right-back or right wing-back for and captains Ekstraklasa club Raków Częstochowa.

== Club career ==
Born in Zagreb, Croatia, Tudor started his career with lower-tier side Mladost Buzin, originally playing as a forward, aged 10 he was spotted by GNK Dinamo Zagreb scouts and moved there, but two years later moved to NK Zagreb where he spent most of his youth career, moving gradually to a right back role. In 2014, he moved to Greece, joining the U20 side of Panathinaikos, where he was helped and mentored by Danijel Pranjić

After a year in Greece, Tudor moved back to Croatia, signing a three and a half-year contract with HNK Hajduk Split. Initially playing for the third-tier B team, where coach Mario Osibov moved him to a more offensive right wing role, he was moved to the first team by the newly appointed sports director/coach Goran Vučević for the match against HNK Rijeka on 18 April 2015, on which he debuted in the first team, scoring the leading goal from a header in the 44th minute in what would be a 1–2 loss for his team, before he was replaced in the 62nd minute by Josip Bašić.

On 27 December 2019, he signed a two-and-a-half-year deal with the option of prolonging it for another two years with Polish Ekstraklasa club Raków Częstochowa.

== International career ==
He made his debut for Croatia in a January 2017 China Cup match against Chile, coming on as a 57th-minute substitute for Filip Ozobić, and earned a total of 3 caps, scoring one goal. His final international was a May 2017 friendly match against Mexico in which he scored his only goal for Croatia.

== Personal life ==
Tudor is an alumnus of the XIII. High School in Zagreb. He is a distant cousin of Igor Tudor, both of them having roots in the village of Milna on the island of Hvar.

== Career statistics ==
=== Club ===
As of match played 27 August 2026

Appearances and goals by club, season and competition
Club	Season	League			National cup (Note: Includes Croatian Football Cup, Polish Cup)		Europe		Other		Total	
Club	Season	Division	Apps	Goals	Apps	Goals	Apps	Goals	Apps	Goals	Apps	Goals
Hajduk Split	2014–15	Prva HNL	7	2	1	0	—		—		8	2
Hajduk Split	2015–16	Prva HNL	31	7	5	0	7 (Note: Appearances in UEFA Europa League)	0	—		43	7
Hajduk Split	2016–17	Prva HNL	27	3	3	2	4	1	—		34	6
Hajduk Split	2017–18	Prva HNL	20	2	3	0	4	0	—		27	2
Hajduk Split	2018–19	Prva HNL	24	1	2	0	1	0	—		27	1
Hajduk Split	Total		109	15	14	2	16	1	—		139	18
Raków Częstochowa	2019–20	Ekstraklasa	16	1	—		—		—		16	1
Raków Częstochowa	2020–21	Ekstraklasa	29	1	5	0	—		—		34	1
Raków Częstochowa	2021–22	Ekstraklasa	31	2	5	0	6 (Note: Appearances in UEFA Conference League)	0	1 (Note: Appearance in Polish Super Cup)	1	43	3
Raków Częstochowa	2022–23	Ekstraklasa	31	2	4	1	6	2	1	0	42	5
Raków Częstochowa	2023–24	Ekstraklasa	27	0	3	0	13 (Note: Eight appearances and two goals in UEFA Champions League, five appearances in UEFA Europa League)	2	1	0	44	2
Raków Częstochowa	2024–25	Ekstraklasa	30	0	1	0	—		—		31	0
Raków Częstochowa	2025–26	Ekstraklasa	22	0	4	0	14	0	—		40	0
Raków Częstochowa	2026–27	Ekstraklasa	1	0	0	0	5	0	—		6	0
Raków Częstochowa	Total		187	6	22	1	44	4	3	1	256	12
Career total			296	21	36	3	60	5	3	1	395	30

=== International ===
Appearances and goals by national team and year
National team	Year	Apps	Goals
Croatia
Croatia	2017	3	1
Total		3	1

Scores and results list Croatia's goal tally first, score column indicates score after each Tudor goal.

List of international goals scored by Fran Tudor
No	Date	Venue	Opponent	Score	Result	Competition
1	27 May 2017	Los Angeles Memorial Coliseum, Los Angeles, United States	Mexico	2–0	2–1	Friendly

== Honours ==
Raków Częstochowa

- Ekstraklasa: 2022–23
- Polish Cup: 2020–21, 2021–22
- Polish Super Cup: 2021, 2022

Individual

- Ekstraklasa Defender of the Season: 2022–23
