= 2020–21 Raków Częstochowa season =

Raków Częstochowa
2020-21 season
- Chairman: Wojciech Cygan
- Manager: Marek Papszun
- Stadium: GIEKSA Arena, Bełchatów
- Ekstraklasa: 2nd of 16
- Polish Cup: Winners
- Top goalscorer: League: Ivi (8 goals); All: Vladislavs Gutkovskis (12 goals)
Home colours	Away colours

The 2020–21 Raków Częstochowa season was the club's 2nd consecutive season in Ekstraklasa. In addition to the domestic league, Raków participated in this season's edition of the Polish Cup.

The club qualified for the following seasons' editions of the UEFA Europa Conference League and the Polish Super Cup.

== Players ==
As of 5 October 2020.

Note: Flags indicate national team as defined under FIFA eligibility rules; some limited exceptions apply. Players may hold more than one non-FIFA nationality.

No.	Pos.	Nation	Player
1	GK	SVK	Branislav Pindroch
2	DF	CZE	Tomáš Petrášek
3	DF	POL	Maciej Wilusz
4	DF	POL	Kamil Piątkowski
5	MF	CRO	Petar Mamić
6	DF	POL	Andrzej Niewulis
7	MF	CRO	Fran Tudor
8	MF	USA	Ben Lederman
9	FW	POL	Oskar Zawada
10	MF	POL	Igor Sapała
11	MF	ESP	Ivi
12	GK	POL	Kacper Trelowski
13	MF	POL	Piotr Malinowski

No.	Pos.	Nation	Player
14	MF	POL	Daniel Szelągowski
15	MF	GRE	Giannis Papanikolaou
17	MF	CZE	Petr Schwarz
20	MF	SRB	Marko Poletanović
21	FW	LAT	Vladislavs Gutkovskis
23	MF	POL	Patryk Kun
27	MF	CZE	Daniel Bartl
29	GK	POL	Jakub Szumski
30	MF	POL	Miłosz Szczepański
40	FW	POL	Michał Litwa
43	MF	SLO	David Tijanić
77	MF	POL	Marcin Cebula
89	DF	POL	Daniel Mikołajewski

== Competitions ==
=== Ekstraklasa ===
==== Standings ====
Pos	Team	Pld	W	D	L	GF	GA	GD	Pts	Qualification or relegation
1	Legia Warsaw (C)	30	19	7	4	48	24	+24	64	Qualification for the Champions League first qualifying round
2	Raków Częstochowa	30	17	8	5	46	25	+21	59	Qualification for the Europa Conference League second qualifying round (Note: Raków Częstochowa qualified for the Europa Conference League by winning the 2020–21 Polish Cup and also by finishing second in the Ekstraklasa. As a result, the berth reserved for third place was passed to the fourth-placed team from the 2020–21 Ekstraklasa.)
3	Pogoń Szczecin	30	15	7	8	36	23	+13	52	Qualification for the Europa Conference League second qualifying round
4	Śląsk Wrocław	30	11	10	9	36	32	+4	43 (Note: Head-to-head points: Śląsk Wrocław 6, Warta Poznań 0.)	Qualification for the Europa Conference League first qualifying round
5	Warta Poznań	30	13	4	13	33	32	+1	43	

Source: ekstraklasa.org
Rules for classification: 1) Points; 2) Head-to-head points; 3) Head-to-head goal difference; 4) Head-to-head goals scored; 5) Head-to-head away goals scored (only if between two teams); 6) Goal difference; 7) Goals scored; 8) Number of wins; 9) Number of away wins; 10) Fairplay ranking; 11) Draw
(C) Champions

==== Matches ====
22 August 2020 1	Raków Częstochowa	1–2	Legia Warsaw	Bełchatów
20:00	Wilusz (yellow card) 6' (yellow-red card) 45+3'; Gutkovskis (yellow card) 20'; Kun 50'; Sapała (yellow card) 50'	Report	Pekhart 16' (yellow card) 67' (goal) 84'; Luís Rocha (yellow card) 45+2'; Mladenović (yellow card) 71'; Luquinhas (yellow card) 76'	Stadium: GIEKSA Arena; Attendance: 1,985; Referee: Jarosław Przybył

29 August 2020 2	Lechia Gdańsk	1–3	Raków Częstochowa	Gdańsk
15:00 CET	Sopoćko (yellow card) 19'; Nalepa (yellow card) 37' (red card) 39'; Kuciak (yellow card) 39'; Omran Haydary 45+3'; Fila (yellow card) 73'	Report	Cebula 46'; Gutkovskis 55' (yellow card) 58' (goal) 76'	Stadium: Stadion Energa Gdańsk; Attendance: 5,424; Referee: Paweł Raczkowski

14 September 2020 3	Raków Częstochowa	2–1	Zagłębie Lubin	Bełchatów
18:00 CET	Gutkovskis 1'; Kun (yellow card) 43'; Tijanić 48'; Cebula (yellow card) 54'; Tudor (yellow card) 80'	Report	Poręba (yellow card) 6'; Balić (yellow card) 35'; Sirk 66' (yellow card) 68'	Stadium: GIEKSA Arena; Attendance: 1,675; Referee: Paweł Gil

18 September 2020 4	Podbeskidzie Bielsko-Biała	1–4	Raków Częstochowa	Bielsko-Biała
18:00 CET	Nowak 13'; Jaroch (yellow card) 45'	Report	Wilusz (yellow card) 7'; Schwarz 21' (pen.) 40' (pen.); Cebula 34'; Gutkovskis 45+1' (pen.); Petrášek (yellow card) 52'	Stadium: Stadion Podbeskidzia; Attendance: 4,397; Referee: Damian Sylwestrzak

26 September 2020 5	Cracovia	2–2	Raków Częstochowa	Kraków
15:00 CET	Piszczek 21'; van Amersfoort (yellow card) 36'; Loshaj (yellow card) 59'; Hanca (yellow card) 67'; Fiolić 90+7'	Report	Petrášek 11'; Tijanić 15'; Kun (yellow card) 57'	Stadium: Stadion Miejski im. Józefa Piłsudskiego; Attendance: 5,127; Referee: Sebastian Jarzębak

2 October 2020 6	Raków Częstochowa	3–0	Wisła Płock	Bełchatów
18:00 CET	Petrášek 11' (yellow card) 57'; Cebula 48'; Tijanić 66'	Report	Lagator (yellow card) 38'; Michalski (yellow card) 62'; Sheridan (yellow card) 90+3'	Stadium: Stadion Miejski; Attendance: 1,631; Referee: Daniel Stefański

17 October 2020 7	Górnik Zabrze	1–3	Raków Częstochowa	Zabrze
17:30 CET	Nowak 4'; Masouras (yellow card) 44'; Manneh (yellow card) 48'; Janža (yellow card) 51'	Report	Ivi 20' 52'; Tijanić 31'	Stadium: Arena Zabrze; Attendance: 0 Referee: Tomasz Kwiatkowski

25 October 2020 8	Raków Częstochowa	2–1	Stal Mielec	Bełchatów
15:00 CET	Ivi 27' 66'; Sapała (yellow card) 38'; Petrášek (yellow card) 90+4'	Report	Krystian Getinger (yellow card) 42'; Szymon Stasik (yellow card) 46'; Domański 77'	Stadium: GIEKSA Arena; Attendance: 0 Referee: Artur Aluszyk

8 November 2020 9	Raków Częstochowa	0–0	Wisła Kraków	Bełchatów
17:30 CET		Report	Frydrych (yellow card) 16'; Abramowicz (yellow card) 69'	Stadium: GIEKSA Arena; Attendance: 0 Referee: Piotr Lasyk

22 November 2020 10	Lech Poznań	3–3	Raków Częstochowa	Poznań
12:30 CET	Ishak 33'; Skóraś (yellow card) 38'; Moder 48' (pen.) (yellow card) 49'; Dani Ramírez 51'	Report	Ivi 16' (yellow card) 36'; Zawada 31'; Niewulis (yellow card) 59'; Kun (yellow card) 64'; Piątkowski (yellow card) 81'; Daniel Szelągowski 90+2'	Stadium: Stadion Poznań; Attendance: 0 Referee: Paweł Gil

29 November 2020 11	Raków Częstochowa	1–0	Warta Poznań	Bełchatów
15:00 CET	Cebula (yellow card) 34'; Daniel Szelągowski (yellow card) 79'; Gutkovskis 90' (pen.)	Report	Adrian Laskowski (yellow card) 72'; Spychała (yellow card) 75'; Ivanov (yellow card) 77'	Stadium: GIEKSA Arena; Attendance: 0 Referee: Daniel Stefański

5 December 2020 12	Śląsk Wrocław	1–0	Raków Częstochowa	Wrocław
17:30 CET	Pawłowski 71'	Report	Piątkowski (yellow card) 85'	Stadium: Stadion Wrocław; Attendance: 0 Referee: Szymon Marciniak

13 December 2020 13	Raków Częstochowa	3–2	Jagiellonia Białystok	Bełchatów
17:30 CET	Poletanović (yellow card) 3'; Niewulis 17'; Kun (yellow card) 45+4'; Schwarz 52' (pen.) 76' (pen.) (yellow card) 90+5'; Tudor (yellow card) 90+4'	Report	Wdowik (yellow card) 8'; Romanczuk (yellow card) 54'; Makuszewski 69'; Borysiuk (yellow card) 73'; Jesús Imaz 90+3'	Stadium: GIEKSA Arena; Attendance: 0 Referee: Mariusz Zlotek

20 December 2020 14	Piast Gliwice	0–0	Raków Częstochowa	Gliwice
15:00 CET	Malarczyk (yellow card) 90+2'	Report	Cebula (yellow card) 53'; Zawada (yellow card) 85'	Stadium: Stadion Piasta; Attendance: 0 Referee: Damian Sylwestrzak

29 January 2021 15	Raków Częstochowa	0–1	Pogoń Szczecin	Bełchatów
20:30 CET		Report		Stadium: GIEKSA Arena; Attendance: 0 Referee: Jarosław Przybył

6 February 2021 16	Legia Warsaw	2–0	Raków Częstochowa	Warsaw
20:00 CET	Luquinhas 29'; Pekhart 64' (pen.) (yellow card) 88'; Rafael Lopes (yellow card) 86'; Wszołek (yellow card) 90+4'	Report	Sapała (yellow card) 20'; Schwarz (yellow card) 45+2'	Stadium: Stadion Wojska Polskiego; Attendance: 0 Referee: (Poland) Paweł Gil
Note: COVID-19 pandemic in Poland

13 February 2021 17	Raków Częstochowa	0–1	Lechia Gdańsk	Bełchatów
20:00 CET	Ivi (yellow card) 28'; Poletanović (yellow card) 52'; Tijanić (yellow card) 59'; Niewulis (yellow card) 67'; Jach (yellow card) 88'	Report	Kubicki 2' (yellow card) 54'; Ceesay (yellow card) 45+1'; Nalepa (yellow card) 52'	Stadium: GIEKSA Arena; Attendance: 0 Referee: (Poland) Paweł Raczkowski
Note: COVID-19 pandemic in Poland

21 February 2021 18	Zagłębie Lubin	1–2	Raków Częstochowa	Lubin
15:00 CET	Szysz 13' (yellow card) 74'; Šimić (yellow card) 28'	Report	Ivi 29'; Sapała (yellow card) 57'; Balić 81' (o.g.); Jach (yellow card) 90+3'	Stadium: Stadion Miejski (Lubin); Attendance: 0 Referee: (Poland) Tomasz Kwiatkowski
Note: COVID-19 pandemic in Poland

26 February 2021 19	Raków Częstochowa	1–0	Podbeskidzie	Bełchatów
18:00 CET	Niewulis 53' (yellow card) 87'	Report	Danielak (yellow card) 70'	Stadium: GIEKSA Arena; Attendance: 0 Referee: (Poland) Krzysztof Jakubik
Note: COVID-19 pandemic in Poland

6 March 2021 20	Raków Częstochowa	0–0	Cracovia Kraków	Bełchatów
20:00 CET	Ivi (yellow card) 42'; Kun (yellow card) 48'; Poletanović (yellow card) 50'; Arsenić (red card) 74'	Report	Hanca (yellow card) 58'; Rodin (yellow card) 88'	Stadium: GIEKSA Arena; Attendance: 0 Referee: (Poland) Jarosław Przybył
Note: COVID-19 pandemic in Poland

13 March 2021 21	Wisła Płock	2–2	Raków Częstochowa	Płock
15:00 CET	Tuszyński 56'; Wolski 70' (yellow card) 90'; Uryga (yellow card) 86'; Rzeźniczak (yellow card) 87'	Report	Piątkowski 72'; Ivi 81' (pen.); Lederman (yellow card) 89'	Stadium: Kazimierz Górski's Płock Municipal Stadium; Attendance: 0 Referee: (Poland) Paweł Gil
Note: COVID-19 pandemic in Poland

20 March 2021 22	Raków Częstochowa	0–0	Górnik Zabrze	Bełchatów
17:30 CET		Report	Gryszkiewicz (yellow card) 22'; Masouras (yellow card) 71'	Stadium: GIEKSA Arena; Attendance: 0 Referee: (Poland) Damian Kos
Note: COVID-19 pandemic in Poland

9 April 2021 24	Wisła Kraków	1–2	Raków Częstochowa	Kraków
20:30 CET	Frydrych 39' (pen.) (yellow card) 79'; Burliga (yellow card) 60'; Zhukov (yellow card) 69'; Kuveljić (yellow card) 75'; Kone (yellow card) 90'	Report	Tijanić 33'; Jach (yellow card) 42'; Cebula 63'; Lederman (yellow card) 88'	Stadium: Stadion Miejski Wisły Kraków im. Henryka Reymana; Attendance: 0 Referee: (Poland) Szymon Marciniak
Note: COVID-19 pandemic in Poland

=== Polish Cup ===
==== Road to the final ====
25 August 2020 Round of 64	Sandecja Nowy Sącz	0–3	Raków Częstochowa	Nowy Sącz

30 October 2020 Round of 32	Bruk-Bet Termalica Nieciecza	0–2	Raków Częstochowa	Nieciecza
				Attendance: 0

10 February 2021 Round of 16	Raków Częstochowa	4–2	Górnik Zabrze	Bełchatów
20:30 CET	Gutkovskis 3'; Ivi 13' 87' (pen.); Sapała (yellow card) 50'; Mikołajewski (yellow card) 70'; Piątkowski (yellow card) 90'; Jach 90+2'	Report	Kubica (yellow card) 23'; Nowak (yellow card) 33'; Jesús Jiménez 55' 72' (pen.); Wiśniewski (yellow card) 84'; Kudła (yellow card) 86'	Stadium: Stadion Miejski; Attendance: 0 Referee: (Poland) Łukasz Szczech
Note: COVID-19 pandemic in Poland

2 March 2021 Quarter-finals	Lech Poznań	0–2	Raków Częstochowa	Poznań
20:30 CET (UTC+01:00)		Łączy nas piłka 90minut	Niewulis 69'; Gutkovskis 77'	Stadium: Stadion Miejski; Attendance: 0 Referee: Paweł Raczkowski (Warsaw)

14 April 2021 Semi-finals	Cracovia	1–2	Raków Częstochowa	Kraków
17:30 CEST (UTC+02:00)		[ Łączy nas piłka] [ 90minut]		Stadium: Stadion Miejski im. Józefa Piłsudskiego

==== Final ====
2 May 2021
16:00 CEST (UTC+02:00)

Raków Częstochowa	2–1	Arka Gdynia
Ivi 81'; Tijanić 89'	Łączy nas piłka 90minut	Żebrowski 57'

Arena Lublin, Lublin
Attendance: 0 (Note: Due to the COVID-19 pandemic, the match have been played behind closed doors without any spectators.)
Referee: Paweł Gil (Lublin)

Raków Częstochowa	Arka Gdynia

==== Final squad ====
GK	28	(Slovakia) Dominik Holec
RCB	4	(Poland) Kamil Piątkowski
CB	6	(Poland) Andrzej Niewulis
LCB	24	(Croatia) Zoran Arsenić	(substituted off) 80'
RM	7	(Croatia) Fran Tudor
RCM	10	(Poland) Igor Sapała	(substituted off) 46'
LCM	8	(United States) Ben Lederman	(substituted off) 85'
LM	23	(Poland) Patryk Kun
RW	77	(Poland) Marcin Cebula	(substituted off) 80'
LW	11	(Spain) Ivi
CF	21	(Latvia) Vladislavs Gutkovskis	(substituted off) 68'
Substitutes:
GK	1	(Slovakia) Branislav Pindroch
DF	33	(Poland) Jarosław Jach
MF	14	(Poland) Daniel Szelągowski	(substituted on) 85'
MF	17	(Czech Republic) Petr Schwarz	(substituted on) 80'
MF	20	(Serbia) Marko Poletanović	(substituted on) 46'
MF	43	(Slovenia) David Tijanić	(substituted on) 80'
MF	47	(Poland) Mateusz Wdowiak
MF	71	(Poland) Wiktor Długosz
FW	18	(Poland) Jakub Arak	(substituted on) 68'
Manager:
(Poland) Marek Papszun

GK	30	(Poland) Kacper Krzepisz
RB	15	(Poland) Arkadiusz Kasperkiewicz	(yellow card) 22'
RCB	29	(Poland) Michał Marcjanik
LCB	3	(Netherlands) Haris Memic
LB	26	(Poland) Adam Danch
RCM	16	(Poland) Adam Deja
LCM	10	(Poland) Juliusz Letniowski		(substituted off) 46'
RW	17	(Poland) Fabian Hiszpanski		(substituted off) 59'
AM	14	(Spain) Luis Valcarce		(substituted off) 59'
LW	77	(Poland) Mateusz Żebrowski		(substituted off) 80'
CF	39	(Poland) Maciej Rosołek
Substitutes:
GK	22	(Poland) Daniel Kajzer
DF	18	(Poland) Paweł Sasin		(substituted on) 80'
DF	28	(Poland) Damian Ślesicki
MF	7	(Ecuador) Christian Alemán
MF	8	(Brazil) Marcus Vinicius	(yellow card) 79'	(substituted on) 46'
FW	9	(Poland) Artur Siemaszko		(substituted on) 59'
FW	21	(Poland) Kacper Skóra		(substituted on) 59'
FW	23	(Poland) Rafał Wolsztyński
FW	25	(Poland) Łukasz Wolsztyński
Manager:
(Poland) Dariusz Marzec

Match officials:
Referee:
Paweł Gil
Assistant referees:
Konrad Sapela
Marcin Borkowski
Fourth official:
Damian Sylwestrzak
Video assistant referee:
Tomasz Kwiatkowski
Tomasz Listkiewicz

Match rules

- 90 minutes.
- 30 minutes of extra-time if necessary.
- Penalty shoot-out if scores still level.
- Nine named substitutes.
- Maximum of five substitutions.
