= Daniel Szelągowski =

Polish footballer (born 2002)

Personal information
- Date of birth: 2 September 2002 (age 24)
- Place of birth: Kielce, Poland
- Height: 1.78 m (5 ft 10 in)
- Position: Forward

Team information
- Current team: AKS 1947 Busko-Zdrój

Youth career
- 2011–2019: Korona Kielce

Senior career*
Years	Team	Apps	(Gls)
2019–2020	Korona Kielce II	11	(2)
2019–2020	Korona Kielce	7	(2)
2020–2024	Raków Częstochowa	34	(1)
2022	→ Warta Poznań (loan)	5	(0)
2022	Raków Częstochowa II	4	(1)
2023	→ Chojniczanka (loan)	5	(0)
2025	Unia Swarzędz	13	(1)
2025	Sparta Kazimierza Wielka	11	(0)
2026	Moravia Morawica	12	(2)
2026–	AKS 1947 Busko-Zdrój	0	(0)

International career
2018	Poland U16	7	(0)
2018–2019	Poland U17	5	(0)
2020	Poland U19	2	(0)
2021	Poland U21	6	(0)
- * Club domestic league appearances and goals as of 12:57, 26 June 2026 (UTC)

Daniel Szelągowski (born 2 September 2002) is a Polish professional footballer who plays as a forward for III liga club AKS 1947 Busko-Zdrój.

== Club career ==
=== Korona Kielce ===
Szelągowski came through the youth ranks of Korona Kielce, where he played since 2011, making his professional debut on 18 May 2019, coming on as a substitute in a 3–0 home Ekstraklasa defeat against Górnik Zabrze.

Despite scoring twice in five league games during the 2019–20 season, Szelągowski could not prevent his team's from relegating to I liga. He subsequently moved to Raków Częstochowa in September 2020.

=== Raków Częstochowa ===
Szelągowski made his debut for Raków on 2 October 2020, coming on as a late substitute in a 3–0 home Ekstraklasa win against Wisła Płock.

He scored his first goal for his new team on 22 November 2020, coming on as an 83rd-minute substitute for Marcin Cebula, and helping his team obtain a 3–3 away draw against Lech Poznań. He drove the ball from his own half, dribbled past multiple opponents and beat the goalkeeper to score in stoppage time.

Szelągowski was part of the side that won the 2020–21 Polish Cup, appearing in the final as a late substitute, providing the assist for David Tijanić's winning goal four minutes after he came in, helping his team beat Arka Gdynia 2–1.

==== Loan to Warta ====
On 11 January 2022, as part of the deal that saw Szymon Czyż join Raków from Warta Poznań on a permanent basis, Szelągowski was loaned the opposite way until the end of the 2021–22 season.

==== Loan to Chojniczanka ====
On 3 January 2022, he was sent on loan to I liga club Chojniczanka Chojnice until the end of the season. On 16 March 2023, it was announced he had suffered a anterior cruciate ligament injury and would be sidelined for over a year, thus ending his season prematurely.

After missing the entirety of the 2023–24 campaign, he terminated his contract with Raków by mutual consent on 8 June 2024.

=== Lower divisions ===
On 3 January 2025, Szelągowski moved to III liga club Unia Swarzędz. On 1 July 2025, Szelągowski signed with III liga newcomers Sparta Kazimierza Wielka. Due to Sparta's financial issues, most of the roster left the club in October. After being linked with a return to Korona Kielce II, on 7 March 2026 Szelągowski was announced as the new signing of IV liga Świętokrzyskie side Moravia Morawica. On 28 August 2026, he moved to recently promoted III liga club AKS 1947 Busko-Zdrój.

== International career ==
Already capped with all Polish youth teams, Szelągowski made his debut for the under-21 team on the 26 March 2021 in a friendly game against Saudi Arabia, where he provided four assists in a 7–0 win.

== Career statistics ==
As of match played 7 June 2026

Appearances and goals by club, season and competition
Club	Season	League			Polish Cup		Europe		Other		Total	
Club	Season	Division	Apps	Goals	Apps	Goals	Apps	Goals	Apps	Goals	Apps	Goals
Korona Kielce II	2018–19	IV liga Święt.	4	2	—		—		—		4	2
Korona Kielce II	2019–20	III liga, gr. IV	7	0	—		—		—		7	0
Korona Kielce II	Total		11	2	—		—		—		11	2
Korona Kielce	2018–19	Ekstraklasa	1	0	—		—		—		1	0
Korona Kielce	2019–20	Ekstraklasa	5	2	0	0	—		—		5	2
Korona Kielce	2020–21	I liga	1	0	1	0	—		—		2	0
Korona Kielce	Total		7	2	1	0	—		—		8	2
Raków Częstochowa	2020–21	Ekstraklasa	16	1	5	0	—		—		21	1
Raków Częstochowa	2021–22	Ekstraklasa	14	0	3	0	6 (Note: Appearances in UEFA Europa Conference League)	0	0	0	23	0
Raków Częstochowa	2022–23	Ekstraklasa	4	0	1	0	0	0	0	0	5	0
Raków Częstochowa	2023–24	Ekstraklasa	0	0	0	0	0	0	0	0	0	0
Raków Częstochowa	Total		34	1	9	0	6	0	0	0	49	1
Warta Poznań (loan)	2021–22	Ekstraklasa	5	0	—		—		—		5	0
Raków Częstochowa II	2022–23	III liga, gr. III	4	1	—		—		—		4	1
Chojniczanka (loan)	2022–23	I liga	5	0	—		—		—		5	0
Unia Swarzędz	2024–25	III liga, gr. II	13	1	—		—		—		13	1
Sparta Kazimierza Wielka	2025–26	III liga, gr. IV	11	0	—		—		—		11	0
Moravia Morawica	2025–26	IV liga Święt.	12	2	—		—		0	0	12	2
AKS 1947 Busko-Zdrój	2026–27	III liga, gr. IV	0	0	—		—		—		0	0
Career total			102	9	10	0	6	0	0	0	118	9

== Honours ==
Korona Kielce II

- IV liga Świętokrzyskie: 2018–19

Raków Częstochowa

- Ekstraklasa: 2022–23
- Polish Cup: 2020–21, 2021–22
- Polish Super Cup: 2021

Individual

- Ekstraklasa Young Player of the Month: July 2020
