= Marko Poletanović =

Serbian footballer

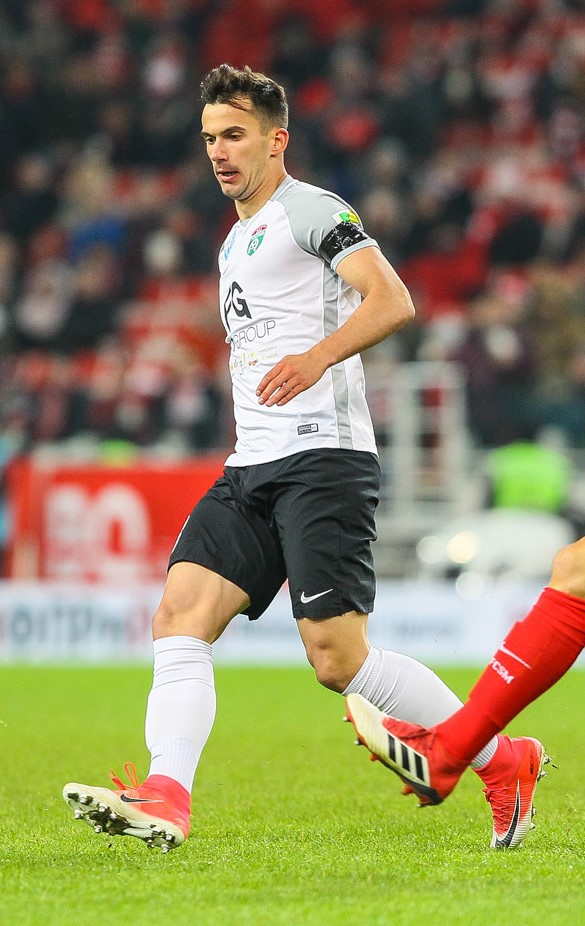
- Poletanović with Tosno in 2018

Personal information
- Date of birth: 20 July 1993 (age 33)
- Place of birth: Novi Sad, FR Yugoslavia
- Height: 1.87 m (6 ft 2 in)
- Position: Central midfielder

Team information
- Current team: Vojvodina
- Number: 4

Youth career
- Vojvodina

Senior career*
Years	Team	Apps	(Gls)
2011–2015	Vojvodina	72	(5)
2011	→ Cement Beočin (loan)	11	(1)
2015–2017	Gent	11	(1)
2016	→ Zulte Waregem (loan)	8	(0)
2016–2017	→ Red Star Belgrade (loan)	23	(3)
2017–2018	Tosno	18	(0)
2018–2019	Jagiellonia Białystok	33	(2)
2020–2022	Raków Częstochowa	45	(1)
2022	Wisła Kraków	10	(0)
2022–2024	Zagłębie Lubin	49	(2)
2022	→ Zagłębie Lubin II	1	(0)
2024–2025	Vojvodina	16	(1)
2025	Wisła Kraków	11	(0)
2025–	Vojvodina	27	(0)

International career
2010	Serbia U17	1	(0)
2011–2012	Serbia U19	9	(0)
2013	Serbia U21	1	(0)
2016	Serbia	1	(0)
- * Club domestic league appearances and goals as of 24 October 2026

Marko Poletanović (Serbian Cyrillic: Марко Полетановић; born 20 July 1993) is a Serbian professional footballer who plays as a defensive midfielder for Serbian SuperLiga club Vojvodina.

== Club career ==
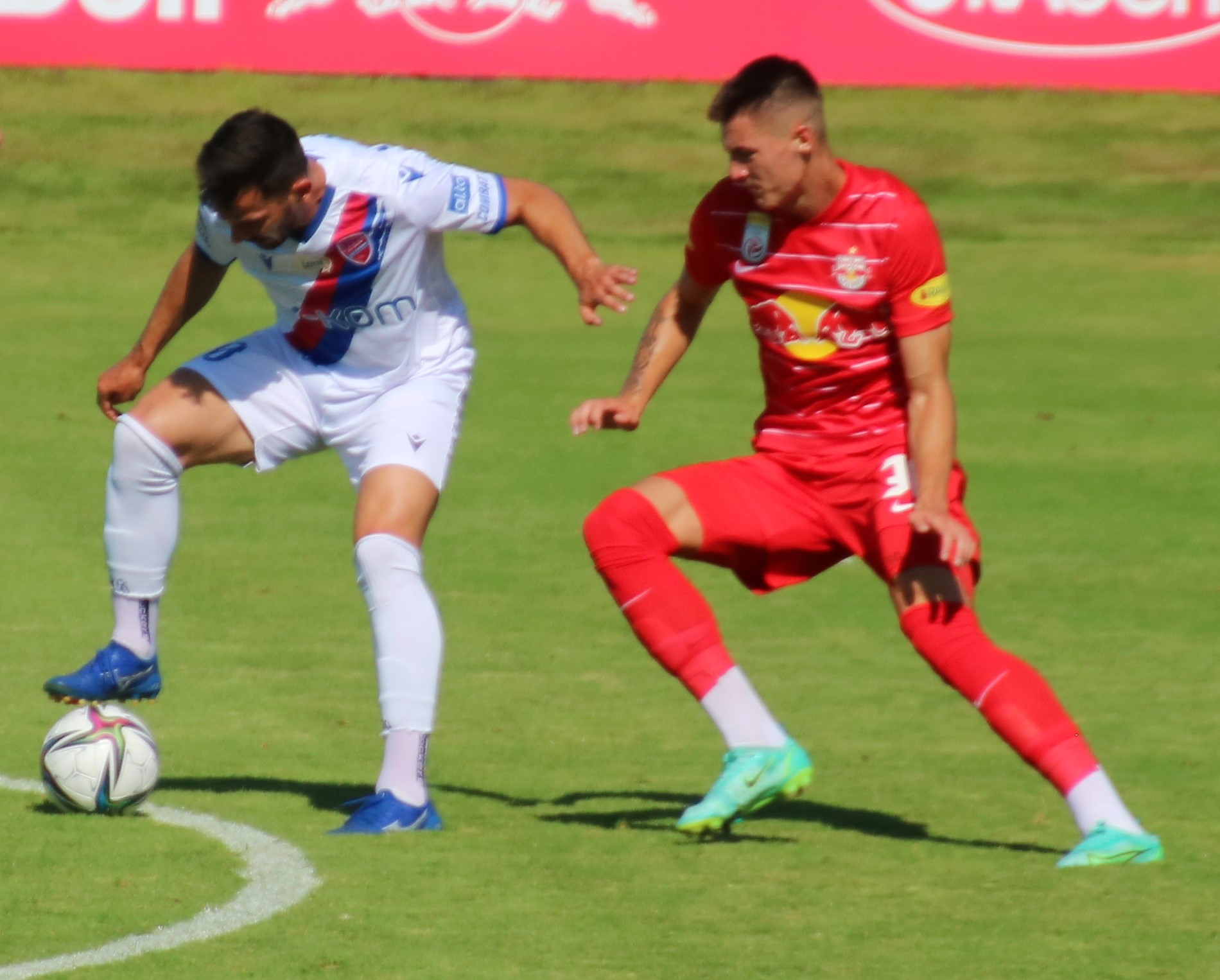
Poletanović in action for Raków Częstochowa in 2021

=== Vojvodina ===
Born in Novi Sad, he played with the youth teams of Vojvodina through several age categories. He made his senior debut in the first half of the 2011–12 season when he was loaned to Serbian League Vojvodina side Cement Beočin. During the winter break he returned to Vojvodina. Despite the fact that at same time Vojvodina brought much older players such as Stephen Appiah and Almami Moreira to the squad in the midfield role, Poletanović managed to earn himself 12 appearances out of 15 matches during his first half season in the Serbian top flight.

=== Gent ===
On 21 January 2015, Poletanović signed a three-and-a-half-year contract with Belgian Pro League club Gent. On 30 December 2015, news was released that he was going to be loaned out for six months to OH Leuven, however a few days later it became apparent that although both clubs had an agreement Poletanović did not want to move to OH Leuven and the deal was cancelled. Eventually, he was loaned to Zulte Waregem. In summer 2017, Poletanović mutually terminated the contract with the club and left as a free agent.

=== Red Star Belgrade ===
On June 22, 2016, he signed a one-year loan deal with Serbian giant, champions Red Star Belgrade, with option for permanent deal. Poletanović made his debut in an official match for Red Star on July 22, in the first round of the new season of the Superliga, in a draw against Napredak. Red Star manager Miodrag Božović praises his debut game. In his second game scored debut goal for Red Star against Metalac, in a win in the second championship round, with another good performance. After the end of season a loan spell expired and Poletanović left the club.

=== Tosno ===
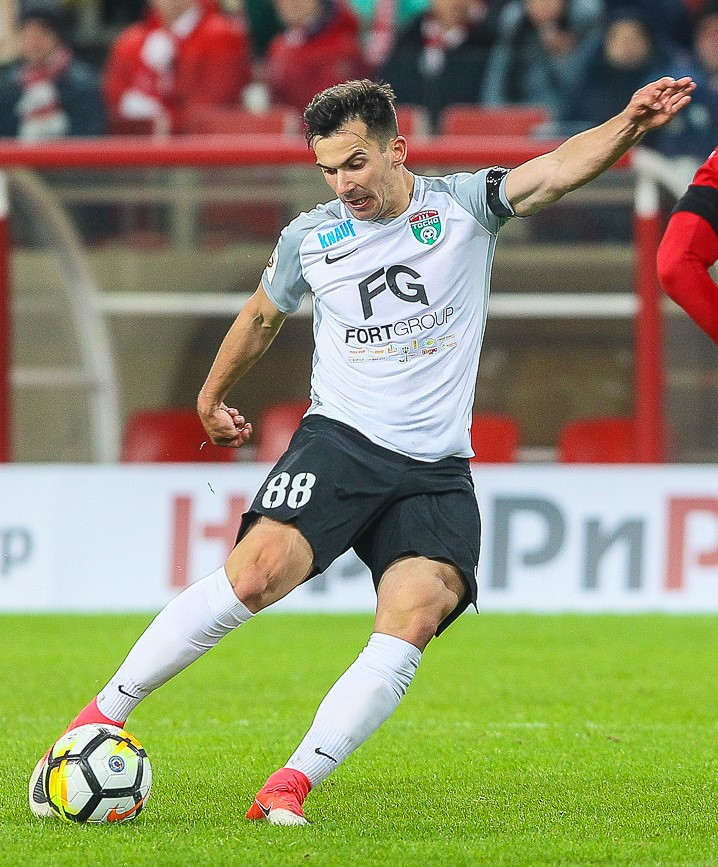
Poletanović in action for Tosno in 2018

On 19 August 2017, he signed a two-year contract with Russian Premier League club Tosno.

He played as Tosno won the 2017–18 Russian Cup final against Avangard Kursk on 9 May 2018 in the Volgograd Arena.

== International career ==
Poletanović played for the Serbian under-17 and under-19 national youth teams. He made his international debut for Serbia in a friendly 3–0 loss to Qatar.

== Career statistics ==
=== Club ===
As of 24 October 2026

Appearances and goals by club, season and competition
Club	Season	League			National cup (Note: Includes Serbian Cup, Belgian Cup, Russian Cup, Polish Cup)		Europe		Other		Total	
Club	Season	Division	Apps	Goals	Apps	Goals	Apps	Goals	Apps	Goals	Apps	Goals
Vojvodina	2011–12	Serbian SuperLiga	12	0	1	0	—		—		13	0
Vojvodina	2012–13	Serbian SuperLiga	19	0	3	0	3 (Note: Appearances in UEFA Europa League)	0	—		25	0
Vojvodina	2013–14	Serbian SuperLiga	26	4	6	0	8	0	—		40	4
Vojvodina	2014–15	Serbian SuperLiga	15	1	3	1	2	0	—		20	2
Vojvodina	Total		72	5	13	1	13	0	—		98	6
Cement Beočin (loan)	2011–12	Serbian League Vojvodina	11	1	—		—		—		11	1
Gent	2014–15	Belgian First Division A	8	1	1	0	—		—		9	1
Gent	2015–16	Belgian First Division A	3	0	0	0	0	0	0	0	3	0
Gent	Total		11	1	1	0	—		—		12	1
Zulte Waregem (loan)	2015–16	Belgian First Division A	8	0	—		—		—		8	0
Red Star Belgrade (loan)	2016–17	Serbian SuperLiga	23	3	3	1	2	0	—		28	4
Tosno	2017–18	Russian Premier League	18	0	3	0	—		—		21	0
Jagiellonia Białystok	2018–19	Ekstraklasa	25	2	5	0	—		—		30	2
Jagiellonia Białystok	2019–20	Ekstraklasa	8	0	1	0	—		—		9	0
Jagiellonia Białystok	Total		33	2	6	0	—		—		39	2
Raków Częstochowa	2019–20	Ekstraklasa	5	0	—		—		—		5	0
Raków Częstochowa	2020–21	Ekstraklasa	21	0	5	0	—		—		26	0
Raków Częstochowa	2021–22	Ekstraklasa	19	1	1	0	6 (Note: Appearances in UEFA Europa Conference League)	0	1 (Note: Appearance in Polish Super Cup)	0	27	1
Raków Częstochowa	Total		45	1	6	0	6	0	1	0	58	1
Wisła Kraków	2021–22	Ekstraklasa	10	0	1	0	—		—		11	0
Zagłębie Lubin	2022–23	Ekstraklasa	24	1	1	0	—		—		25	1
Zagłębie Lubin	2023–24	Ekstraklasa	25	1	2	0	—		—		27	1
Zagłębie Lubin	Total		49	2	3	0	—		—		52	2
Zagłębie Lubin II	2022–23	II liga	1	0	—		—		—		1	0
Vojvodina	2024–25	Serbian SuperLiga	16	1	1	0	3 (Note: Two appearances in UEFA Europa League, one appearance in UEFA Conference League)	0	—		20	1
Wisła Kraków	2024–25	I liga	10	0	—		—		2 (Note: One appearance in I liga promotion play-offs, one appearance in Polish Super Cup)	0	12	0
Vojvodina	2025–26	Serbian SuperLiga	19	0	2	0	—		—		21	0
Vojvodina	2026–27	Serbian SuperLiga	8	0	0	0	2	0	—		10	0
Vojvodina	Total		27	0	2	0	2	0	—		31	0
Career total			334	16	39	2	26	0	3	0	402	18

=== International ===
Appearances and goals by national team and year
National team	Year	Apps	Goals
Serbia	2016	1	0
Total		1	0

== Honours ==
Vojvodina

- Serbian Cup: 2013–14

Gent

- Belgian First Division A: 2014–15

Tosno

- Russian Cup: 2017–18

Raków Częstochowa

- Polish Cup: 2020–21, 2021–22
- Polish Super Cup: 2021
