= Ben Lederman =

American footballer (born 2000)

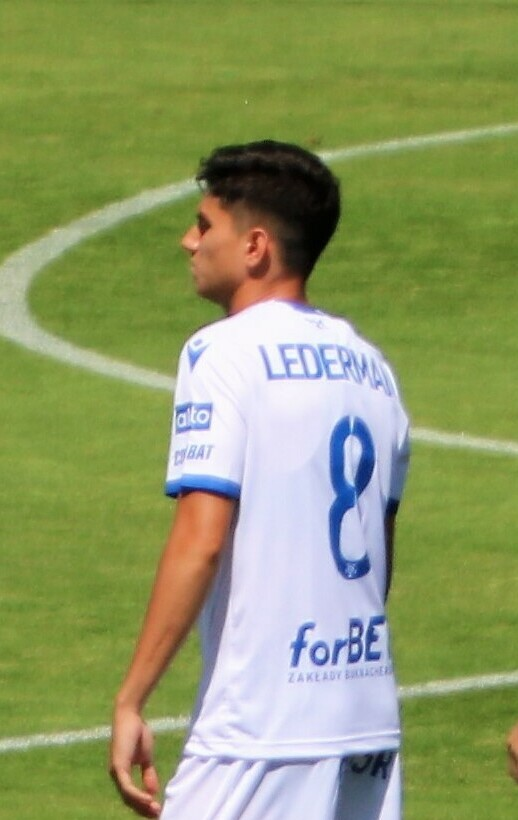
- Lederman with Raków Częstochowa in 2021

Personal information
- Full name: Ben Lederman
- Date of birth: 8 May 2000 (age 26)
- Place of birth: Calabasas, California, United States
- Height: 1.82 m (6 ft 0 in)
- Position: Midfielder

Team information
- Current team: Wieczysta Kraków
- Number: 8

Youth career
- 2011–2015: Barcelona
- 2015–2017: IMG Academy
- 2017–2018: Barcelona
- 2018–2020: Gent

Senior career*
Years	Team	Apps	(Gls)
2020	Hakoah Amidar Ramat Gan	1	(0)
2020–2025	Raków Częstochowa	95	(1)
2022	Raków Częstochowa II	1	(0)
2025–2026	Maccabi Tel Aviv	7	(0)
2026–	Wieczysta Kraków	0	(0)

International career
2022	Poland U21	3	(0)
- * Club domestic league appearances and goals as of 22:40, 26 May 2026 (UTC)

Ben Lederman (Hebrew: בן לדרמן; born 8 May 2000) is a professional footballer who plays as a midfielder for Ekstraklasa club Wieczysta Kraków. Born in the United States, he was a youth international for Poland.

== Early life ==
Lederman was born in Los Angeles, California to Israeli expatriates of Polish-Jewish descent, Danny and Tammy. His father was a small business owner and his mother, a real estate agent. In 2011, the entire family moved to Barcelona so Ben could join La Masia, FC Barcelona's youth academy.

== Club career ==
At age 11, Lederman was identified by scouts from FC Barcelona in a friendly match between his California State U10 team and FC Barcelona Academy Benjamin A. He was subsequently invited to train at La Masia and joined the academy thereafter.

In January 2020, Lederman left Belgium and joined Beitar Jerusalem on trial. He did not earn a contract with the Premier League side and instead signed with Liga Alef's Hakoah Amidar Ramat Gan. On 14 February 2020, Lederman made his first and only appearance for Hakoah Amidar Ramat Gan in a Liga Alef South match against Maccabi Sha'arayim. Lederman started and went 65 minutes before being replaced by Michael Ben Baruch in a 1–0 loss. Lederman was released by the club on 27 February 2020 so he could join Raków Częstochowa in the Polish Ekstraklasa.

Lederman made his first team debut on 20 June 2020, coming on as a substitute for David Tijanič in the 84th minute against Wisła Kraków. On 2 May 2021, Lederman won the first trophy of his professional career as Raków Częstochowa defeated Arka Gdynia in the final of the Polish Cup.

On 30 May 2025, Lederman moved on a free transfer to Israeli club Maccabi Tel Aviv.

On 19 June 2026, Lederman returned to Poland, joining Ekstraklasa newcomers Wieczysta Kraków on a two-year contract with an option for a third.

== International career ==
Lederman represented United States at under-15 and under-17 levels.

In May 2021, he was invited to a training camp with the Poland under-21 team in Warka. Later that year, he earned his first official U21 call-up for 2023 UEFA European Under-21 Championship qualification matches against Germany U21 and Latvia U21 on 12 and 16 November 2021.

In March 2023, he received his first call-up to the Poland senior national team for the UEFA Euro 2024 qualifying matches against Czech Republic and Albania.

== Personal life ==
Lederman is Jewish and celebrated his bar mitzvah at a local synagogue in Barcelona.

== Career statistics ==
As of match played 23 May 2026

Appearances and goals by club, season and competition
Club	Season	League			National cup (Note: Includes Polish Cup, Israel State Cup)		Continental		Other		Total	
Club	Season	Division	Apps	Goals	Apps	Goals	Apps	Goals	Apps	Goals	Apps	Goals
Hakoah Amidar Ramat Gan	2019–20	Liga Alef	1	0	0	0	—		—		1	0
Raków Częstochowa	2019–20	Ekstraklasa	6	0	0	0	—		—		6	0
Raków Częstochowa	2020–21	Ekstraklasa	13	0	4	0	—		—		17	0
Raków Częstochowa	2021–22	Ekstraklasa	23	1	4	1	1 (Note: Appearance(s) in UEFA Europa Conference League)	0	1 (Note: Appearance in Polish Super Cup)	0	29	2
Raków Częstochowa	2022–23	Ekstraklasa	24	0	3	0	3	0	1	0	31	0
Raków Częstochowa	2023–24	Ekstraklasa	22	0	2	1	11 (Note: Six appearances in UEFA Champions League, five appearances in UEFA Europa League)	0	1	0	36	1
Raków Częstochowa	2024–25	Ekstraklasa	7	0	0	0	—		—		7	0
Raków Częstochowa	Total		95	1	13	2	15	0	3	0	126	3
Raków Częstochowa II	2022–23	III liga, gr. III	1	0	—		—		—		1	0
Maccabi Tel Aviv	2025–26	Israeli Premier League	7	0	2	0	9 (Note: Two appearances in UEFA Champions League, seven appearances in UEFA Europa League)	0	1 (Note: Appearance in Toto Cup)	0	19	0
Wieczysta Kraków	2026–27	Ekstraklasa	0	0	0	0	—		—		0	0
Career total			104	1	15	2	24	0	4	0	147	3

== Honours ==
Raków Częstochowa

- Ekstraklasa: 2022–23
- Polish Cup: 2020–21, 2021–22
- Polish Super Cup: 2021, 2022

Maccabi Tel Aviv

- Israel State Cup: 2025–26

Individual

- Ekstraklasa Young Player of the Month: December 2021
