= Zoran Arsenić =

Croatian footballer (born 1994)

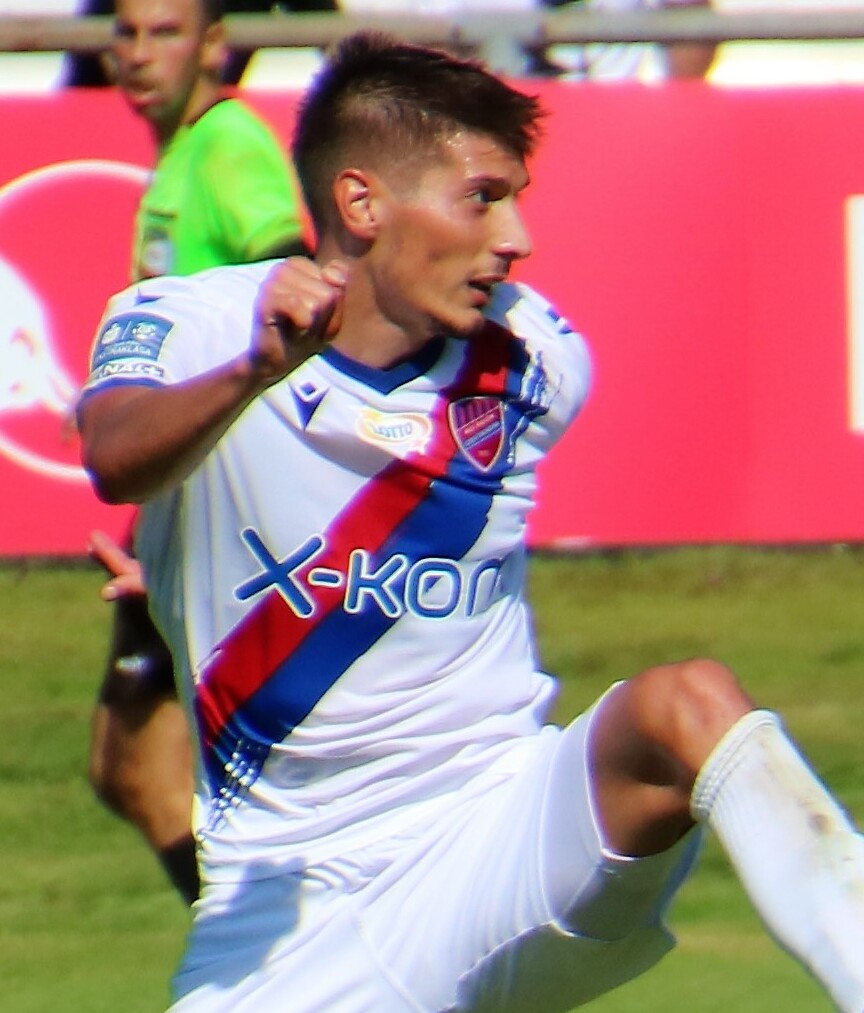
- Arsenić with Raków Częstochowa in 2021

Personal information
- Full name: Zoran Arsenić
- Date of birth: 2 June 1994 (age 32)
- Place of birth: Osijek, Croatia
- Height: 1.88 m (6 ft 2 in)
- Position: Centre-back

Team information
- Current team: Legia Warsaw
- Number: 24

Youth career
- Osijek

Senior career*
Years	Team	Apps	(Gls)
2012	Višnjevac	2	(0)
2013–2017	Osijek	42	(0)
2013–2014	→ Segesta (loan)	19	(0)
2014–2015	→ Sesvete (loan)	20	(2)
2017–2019	Wisła Kraków	43	(3)
2019–2021	Jagiellonia Białystok	44	(0)
2020–2021	→ Rijeka (loan)	9	(0)
2021	→ Raków Częstochowa (loan)	9	(1)
2021–2026	Raków Częstochowa	98	(2)
2026–	Legia Warsaw	1	(1)
- * Club domestic league appearances and goals as of 12:41, 25 July 2026 (UTC)

Zoran Arsenić (born 2 June 1994) is a Croatian professional footballer who plays as a centre-back for Ekstraklasa club Legia Warsaw.

== Club career ==
Coming from the NK Osijek academy, Arsenić was ceded to NK Višnjevac during his first U19 year, where he gathered a couple of senior caps in the Treća HNL Istok. Returning to Osijek, he made his first team debut on 22 June 2013, as a starter in a 1–2 home loss against NK Lokomotiva. Not long afterwards, he was sent on loan to Druga HNL side HNK Segesta, where he spent most of the 2013–14 season, and the following season to NK Sesvete, playing in the same tier. He settled as a regular at NK Osijek at the start of the 2015–16 season.

On 4 January 2017, Arsenić signed a contract with Wisła Kraków valid from 1 July 2017. On 17 May 2018, he signed a contract extension that tied him to Wisła until 2022. However, due to Wisła's regulatory difficulties his contract was dissolved by mutual consent in January 2019.

On 16 January 2019, he signed a three-and-a-half-year contract with Jagiellonia Białystok. On 7 September 2020, Arsenić was loaned out to Rijeka. On 24 February 2021, he was loaned out to Raków Częstochowa, whom he later joined on a permanent basis in the summer of 2021.

On 25 May 2026, Arsenić signed for Legia Warsaw. He scored his first goal for Legia on 24 July 2026, on his debut against Pogoń Szczecin during the first matchday of the 2026–27 Ekstraklasa season.

== Career statistics ==
As of match played 25 July 2026

Appearances and goals by club, season and competition
Club	Season	League			National cup (Note: Includes Croatian Cup, Polish Cup)		Continental		Other		Total	
Club	Season	Division	Apps	Goals	Apps	Goals	Apps	Goals	Apps	Goals	Apps	Goals
Osijek	2013–14	Prva HNL	1	0	—		—		—		1	0
Osijek	2015–16	Prva HNL	24	0	2	0	—		—		26	0
Osijek	2016–17	Prva HNL	17	0	3	0	—		—		20	0
Osijek	Total		42	0	5	0	—		—		47	0
Segesta (loan)	2013–14	2. HNL	19	0	0	0	—		—		19	0
Sesvete (loan)	2014–15	2. HNL	20	2	0	0	—		—		20	2
Wisła Kraków	2017–18	Ekstraklasa	31	3	2	0	—		—		33	3
Wisła Kraków	2018–19	Ekstraklasa	12	0	1	0	—		—		13	0
Wisła Kraków	Total		43	3	3	0	—		—		46	3
Jagiellonia Białystok	2018–19	Ekstraklasa	13	0	2	0	—		—		15	0
Jagiellonia Białystok	2019–20	Ekstraklasa	30	0	0	0	—		—		30	0
Jagiellonia Białystok	2020–21	Ekstraklasa	1	0	1	0	—		—		2	0
Jagiellonia Białystok	Total		44	0	3	0	—		—		47	0
Rijeka (loan)	2020–21	Prva HNL	9	0	1	0	0	0	—		10	0
Raków Częstochowa (loan)	2020–21	Ekstraklasa	9	1	2	0	—		—		11	1
Raków Częstochowa	2021–22	Ekstraklasa	21	1	5	0	5 (Note: Appearances in UEFA Conference League)	0	1 (Note: Appearance in Polish Super Cup)	0	32	1
Raków Częstochowa	2022–23	Ekstraklasa	31	0	4	0	6	0	1	0	42	0
Raków Częstochowa	2023–24	Ekstraklasa	16	0	1	0	8 (Note: Seven appearances in UEFA Champions League, one appearance in UEFA Europa League)	0	1	0	26	0
Raków Częstochowa	2024–25	Ekstraklasa	20	1	0	0	—		—		20	1
Raków Częstochowa	2025–26	Ekstraklasa	10	0	1	0	7	0	—		18	0
Raków Częstochowa	Total		107	3	13	0	26	0	3	0	149	3
Legia Warsaw	2026–27	Ekstraklasa	1	1	0	0	—		—		1	1
Career total			285	8	25	0	26	0	3	0	339	8

== Honours ==
Raków Częstochowa

- Ekstraklasa: 2022–23
- Polish Cup: 2020–21, 2021–22
- Polish Super Cup: 2021, 2022
