= Marcin Cebula =

Polish footballer (born 1995)

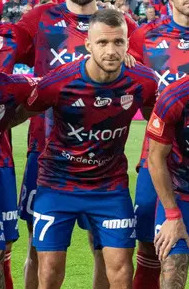
- Cebula in 2023 with Raków Częstochowa

Personal information
- Date of birth: 6 December 1995 (age 30)
- Place of birth: Staszów, Poland
- Height: 1.77 m (5 ft 10 in)
- Position: Attacking midfielder

Team information
- Current team: Stal Mielec
- Number: 7

Youth career
- Pogoń 1945 Staszów
- 2008–2012: Korona Kielce

Senior career*
Years	Team	Apps	(Gls)
2013–2019	Korona Kielce II	36	(12)
2013–2020	Korona Kielce	144	(7)
2020–2024	Raków Częstochowa	70	(11)
2024–2025	Śląsk Wrocław	8	(0)
2025–2026	Korona Kielce	8	(0)
2025	Korona Kielce II	1	(0)
2026–	Stal Mielec	0	(0)

International career
2014	Poland U19	3	(0)
2015	Poland U20	6	(0)
- * Club domestic league appearances and goals as of 21:04, 29 May 2026 (UTC)

Marcin Cebula (born 6 December 1995) is a Polish professional footballer who plays as an attacking midfielder for I liga club Stal Mielec.

== Honours ==
Korona Kielce II

- IV liga Świętokrzyskie: 2018–19

Raków Częstochowa

- Ekstraklasa: 2022–23
- Polish Cup: 2020–21, 2021–22
- Polish Super Cup: 2021
