= Patryk Kun =

Polish footballer (born 1995)

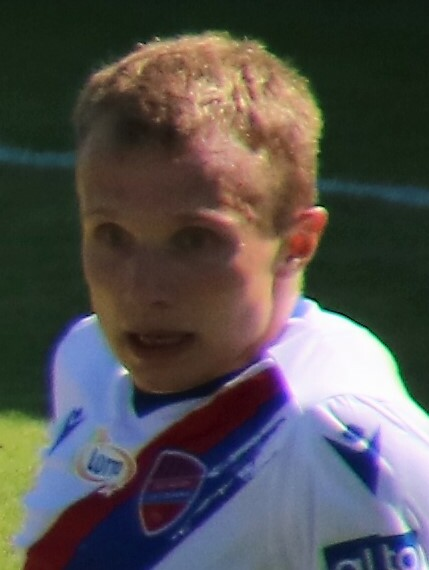
- Kun with Raków Częstochowa in 2021

Personal information
- Date of birth: 20 April 1995 (age 31)
- Place of birth: Giżycko, Poland
- Height: 1.65 m (5 ft 5 in)
- Position: Left winger

Team information
- Current team: Wisła Płock
- Number: 23

Youth career
- Koszałek Opałek Węgorzewo
- 2010–2011: Vęgoria Węgorzewo

Senior career*
Years	Team	Apps	(Gls)
2011–2012	Vęgoria Węgorzewo		
2012–2014	Stomil Olsztyn	14	(1)
2014–2016	Rozwój Katowice	45	(6)
2014	→ Vęgoria Węgorzewo (loan)		
2016–2017	Stomil Olsztyn	33	(6)
2017–2018	Arka Gdynia	28	(2)
2018–2023	Raków Częstochowa	134	(5)
2023–2026	Legia Warsaw	59	(1)
2026–	Wisła Płock	7	(1)

International career
2013	Poland U18	1	(0)
- * Club domestic league appearances and goals as of 20:49, 15 September 2026 (UTC)

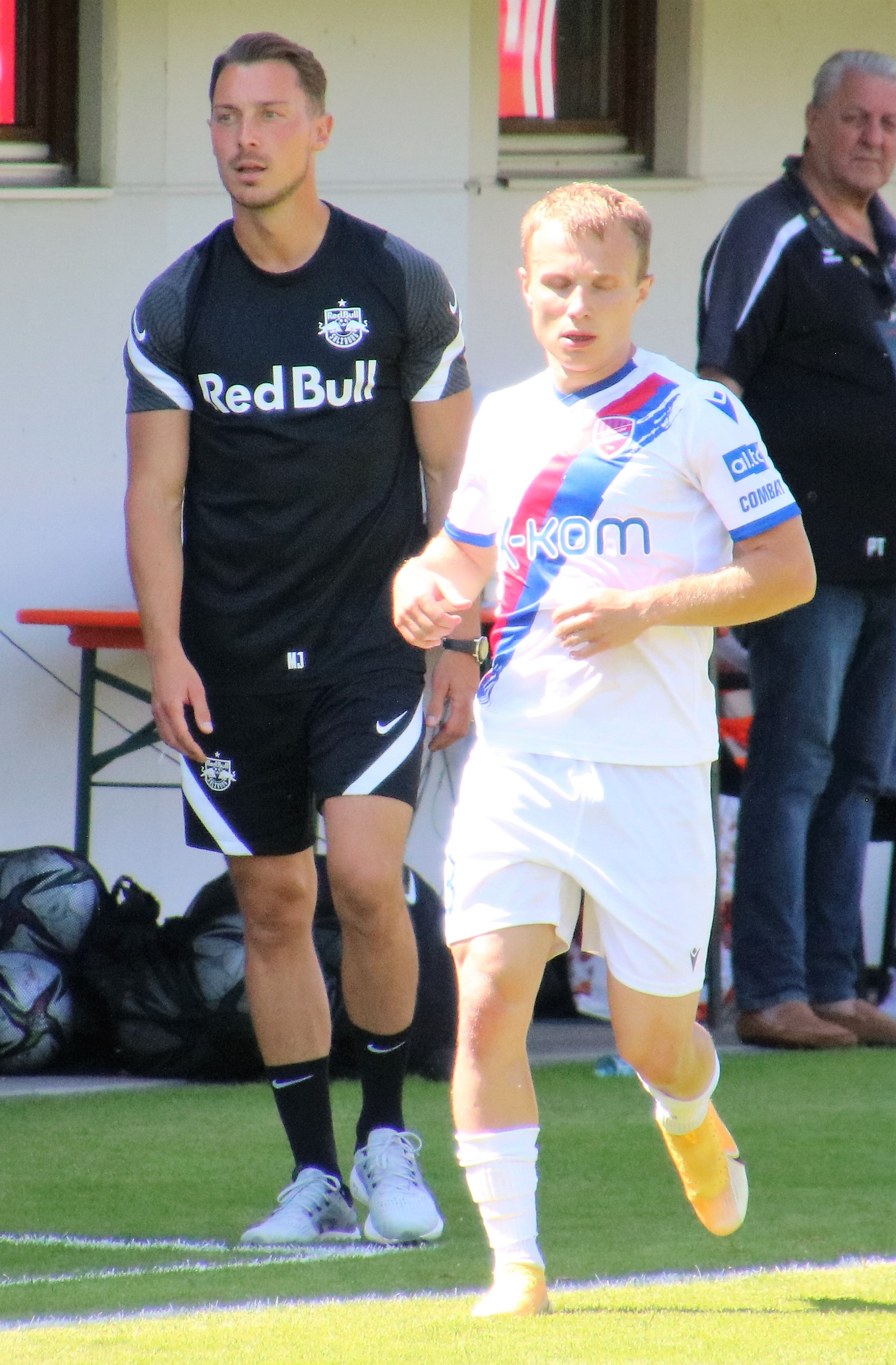
Kun (right) during a friendly match.

Patryk Kun (born 20 April 1995) is a Polish professional footballer who plays as a left winger for Ekstraklasa club Wisła Płock.

== International career ==
Kun was called up to the senior Poland squad for a friendly match with Scotland on 24 March 2022 and the 2022 FIFA World Cup qualification playoff against Sweden on 29 March 2022.

Kun was named in the provisional squad for Poland for the 2022 FIFA World Cup campaign, but he was not selected for the final 26-man squad.

== Career statistics ==
As of match played 10 May 2026

Appearances and goals by club, season and competition
Club	Season	League			Polish Cup		Continental		Other		Total	
Club	Season	Division	Apps	Goals	Apps	Goals	Apps	Goals	Apps	Goals	Apps	Goals
Vęgoria Węgorzewo	2010–11	III liga, gr. B	9	2	—		—		—		9	2
Stomil Olsztyn	2012–13	I liga	1	0	—		—		—		1	0
Stomil Olsztyn	2013–14	I liga	13	0	1	0	—		—		14	0
Stomil Olsztyn	Total		14	0	1	0	—		—		15	0
Rozwój Katowice	2014–15	II liga	14	2	—		—		—		14	2
Rozwój Katowice	2015–16	I liga	31	4	2	0	—		—		33	4
Rozwój Katowice	Total		45	6	2	0	—		—		47	6
Stomil Olsztyn	2016–17	I liga	33	6	2	0	—		—		35	6
Arka Gdynia	2017–18	Ekstraklasa	28	2	2	0	2 (Note: Appearances in UEFA Europa League)	0	1 (Note: Appearance in Polish Super Cup)	0	33	2
Raków Częstochowa	2018–19	I liga	30	1	4	0	—		—		34	1
Raków Częstochowa	2019–20	Ekstraklasa	21	0	0	0	—		—		21	0
Raków Częstochowa	2020–21	Ekstraklasa	29	1	6	0	—		—		35	1
Raków Częstochowa	2021–22	Ekstraklasa	30	1	5	0	6 (Note: Appearances in UEFA Conference League)	0	1	0	42	1
Raków Częstochowa	2022–23	Ekstraklasa	24	2	5	0	6	0	1	0	36	2
Raków Częstochowa	Total		134	5	20	0	12	0	2	0	168	5
Legia Warsaw	2023–24	Ekstraklasa	27	1	1	0	13	0	1	0	42	1
Legia Warsaw	2024–25	Ekstraklasa	16	0	3	0	8	0	—		27	0
Legia Warsaw	2025–26	Ekstraklasa	16	0	0	0	2	0	1	0	19	0
Legia Warsaw	Total		59	1	4	0	23	0	2	0	88	1
Wisła Płock	2026–27	Ekstraklasa	0	0	0	0	—		—		0	0
Career total			322	22	31	0	37	0	5	0	395	22

== Honours ==
Arka Gdynia

- Polish Super Cup: 2017

Raków Częstochowa

- Ekstraklasa: 2022–23
- I liga: 2018–19
- Polish Cup: 2020–21, 2021–22
- Polish Super Cup: 2021, 2022

Legia Warsaw

- Polish Cup: 2024–25
- Polish Super Cup: 2023, 2025
