= Mario Zebić =

Croatian footballer (born 1995)

Personal information
- Full name: Mario Zebić
- Date of birth: 17 December 1995 (age 30)
- Place of birth: Split, Croatia
- Height: 1.87 m (6 ft 2 in)
- Position: Centre-back

Team information
- Current team: Gjilani
- Number: 6

Youth career
- –2012: RNK Split
- 2012–2013: Mosor

Senior career*
Years	Team	Apps	(Gls)
2013	Mosor	2	(0)
2013–2014	Adriatic		
2014	Dugopolje		
2014–2016	Sonthofen	38	(1)
2016–2018	Primorac		
2018	Imotski		
2018–2019	Primorac		
2019	Varaždin	8	(0)
2019–2021	Tabor Sežana	38	(1)
2021–2022	Korona Kielce	50	(0)
2022–2023	Argeș Pitești	11	(1)
2023–2024	Sông Lam Nghệ An	25	(0)
2024–2025	Maziya	3	(0)
2025	Hebar	15	(0)
2025–	Gjilani	12	(0)
- * Club domestic league appearances and goals as of 22 June 2026

Mario Zebić (born 17 December 1995) is a Croatian professional footballer who plays as a centre-back for Kosovo Superleague club Gjilani.

== Career ==
During his career, Zebić had played in several countries, including his home country Croatia, Germany, Slovenia, Poland, Romania and Vietnam. He is mostly known for his passage in the Polish Ekstraklasa for Korona Kielce and the Romanian Liga I for Argeș Pitești.

== Honours ==
Varaždin

- Croatian Second League: 2018–19

Korona Kielce II

- IV liga Świętokrzyskie: 2021–22
