= Dominik Kun =

Polish footballer

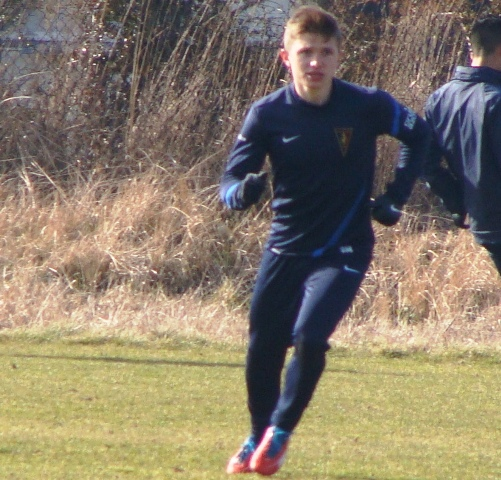
- Kun training with Pogoń Szczecin in 2014

Personal information
- Full name: Dominik Kun
- Date of birth: 22 June 1993 (age 33)
- Place of birth: Giżycko, Poland
- Height: 1.71 m (5 ft 7 1/2 in)
- Position: Winger

Team information
- Current team: Arka Gdynia
- Number: 14

Youth career
- Koszałek Opałek Węgorzewo
- –2009: Vęgoria Węgorzewo

Senior career*
Years	Team	Apps	(Gls)
2009–2011	Vęgoria Węgorzewo	51	(7)
2011–2014	Stomil Olsztyn	50	(8)
2014–2015	Pogoń Szczecin	36	(1)
2015–2018	Wisła Płock	34	(1)
2017–2018	→ Pogoń Siedlce (loan)	19	(3)
2018–2019	Stomil Olsztyn	19	(1)
2019–2020	Sandecja Nowy Sącz	43	(5)
2020–2024	Widzew Łódź	127	(8)
2024–2026	Wisła Płock	69	(4)
2026–	Arka Gdynia	0	(0)

International career
2012–2013	Poland U20	3	(0)
2014	Poland U21	1	(0)
- * Club domestic league appearances and goals as of 17:57, 29 May 2026 (UTC)

Dominik Kun (born 22 June 1993) is a Polish professional footballer who plays as a winger for I liga club Arka Gdynia.

== Club career ==
On 14 August 2020, he signed a two-year contract with Widzew Łódź.

On 19 June 2024, Kun moved to I liga club Wisła Płock on a two-year contract, returning to the club after seven years.

On 17 June 2026, Kun signed a two-year deal with second-tier side Arka Gdynia.

== Personal life ==
His brother Patryk is also a professional footballer, currently playing for Wisła Płock.
