= Tomáš Petrášek =

Czech footballer (born 1992)

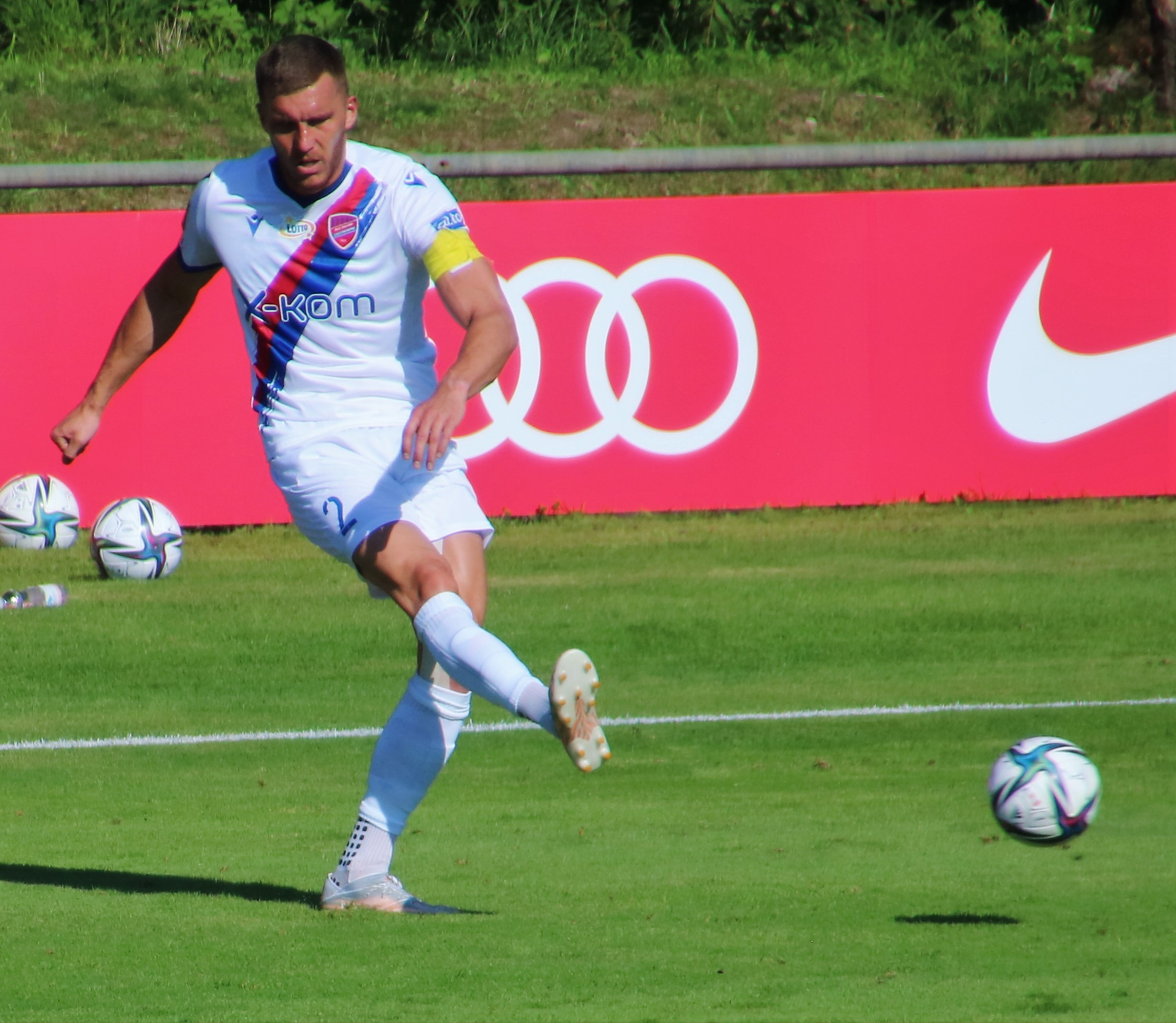
- Petrášek with Raków Częstochowa

Personal information
- Date of birth: 2 March 1992 (age 34)
- Place of birth: Rychnov nad Kněžnou, Czechoslovakia
- Height: 1.99 m (6 ft 6 in)
- Position: Centre-back

Team information
- Current team: Hradec Králové
- Number: 4

Senior career*
| Years | Team | Apps | (Gls) |
| 2012–2015 | Hradec Králové B | 0 | (0) |
| 2012 | → Hlavice (loan) | 11 | (0) |
| 2013–2014 | → Roudnice nad Labem (loan) | | |
| 2014 | → Kolín (loan) | 14 | (1) |
| 2015 | Flota Świnoujście | 0 | (0) |
| 2015 | Převýšov | | |
| 2015–2016 | Slavoj Vyšehrad | 15 | (0) |
| 2016 | Viktoria Žižkov | 18 | (5) |
| 2016–2023 | Raków Częstochowa | 151 | (32) |
| 2023–2024 | Jeonbuk Hyundai Motors | 8 | (0) |
| 2024– | Hradec Králové | 48 | (4) |

International career
| 2020–2022 | Czech Republic | 3 | (0) |
- * Club domestic league appearances and goals as of 25 May 2026

Tomáš Petrášek (born 2 March 1992) is a Czech professional footballer who plays as a centre-back for Czech First League club Hradec Králové.

== Career ==
Petrášek started his career with Hradec Králové. He debuted for the Czech senior squad on 7 October 2020 in a friendly match against Cyprus.

On 5 August 2024, Petrášek signed a multi-year contract with Hradec Králové.

== Honours ==
Raków Częstochowa

- Ekstraklasa: 2022–23
- I liga: 2018–19
- II liga: 2016–17
- Polish Cup: 2020–21, 2021–22
- Polish Super Cup: 2021

Individual

- I liga Team of the Season: 2018–19
