= Tomasz Tymosiak =

Polish footballer (born 1993)

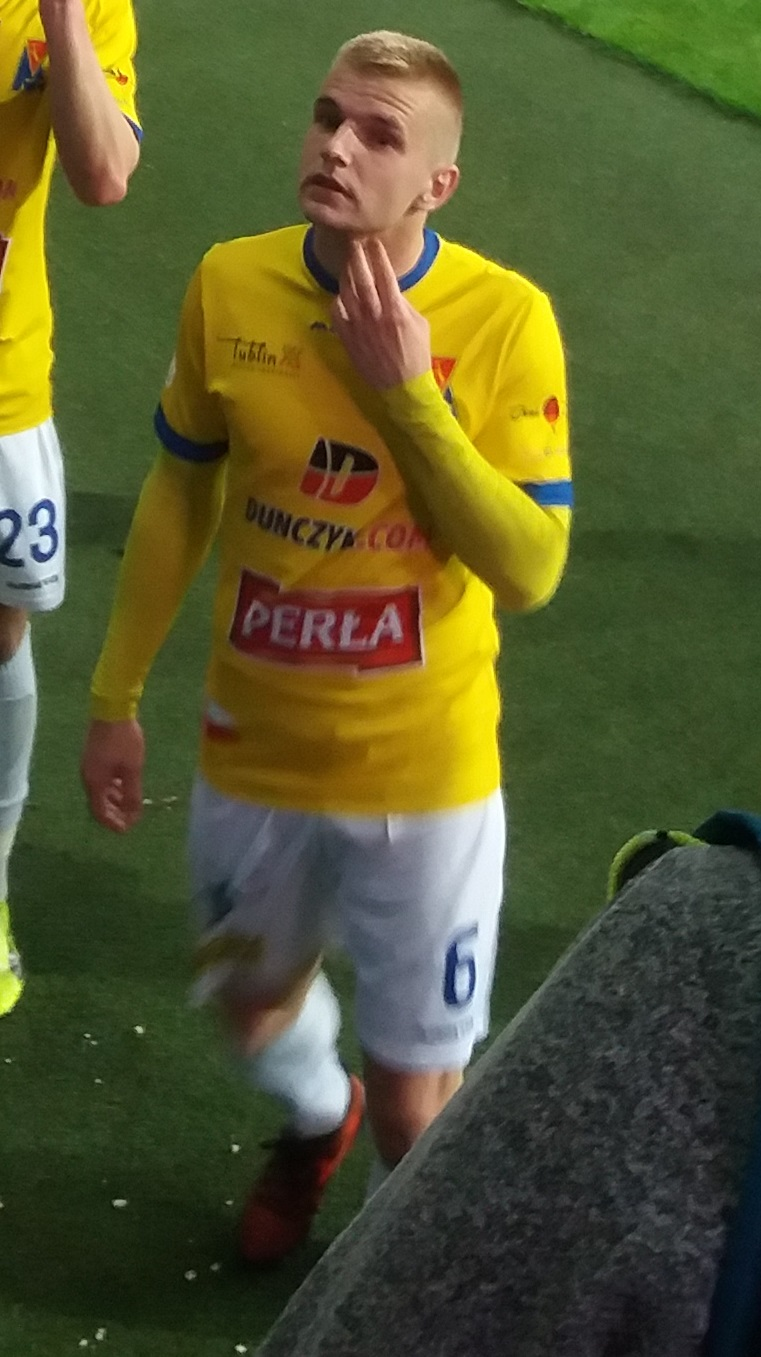
- Tymosiak with Motor Lublin in 2018

Personal information
- Date of birth: 19 March 1993 (age 33)
- Place of birth: Lublin, Poland
- Height: 1.82 m (6 ft 0 in)
- Position: Midfielder

Team information
- Current team: Świdniczanka Świdnik
- Number: 6

Youth career
- 2009–2011: Górnik Łęczna

Senior career*
| Years | Team | Apps | (Gls) |
| 2011 | Orlęta Radzyń Podlaski | 15 | (0) |
| 2012–2013 | Bogdanka/Górnik Łęczna | 24 | (0) |
| 2013–2015 | Orlęta Radzyń Podlaski | 60 | (12) |
| 2015–2018 | Motor Lublin | 93 | (6) |
| 2018–2022 | Górnik Łęczna | 70 | (1) |
| 2022 | Stomil Olsztyn | 6 | (0) |
| 2022 | Lublinianka | 11 | (2) |
| 2023 | Garbarnia Kraków | 13 | (2) |
| 2023–2024 | Podhale Nowy Targ | 30 | (3) |
| 2024–2025 | Lewart Lubartów | 4 | (0) |
| 2025– | Świdniczanka Świdnik | 44 | (7) |
- * Club domestic league appearances and goals as of 16:14, 4 June 2026 (UTC)

Tomasz Tymosiak (born 19 March 1993) is a Polish professional footballer who plays as a midfielder for IV liga Lublin club Świdniczanka Świdnik.

== Career ==
Tymosiak began his career at Górnik Łęczna. On 17 March 2012, he made his debut in professional football as a part of the Bogdanka Łęczna squad. In July 2015, he moved to III liga side Motor Lublin. On 30 June 2016, he signed a new one-year contract with Motor.

On 29 June 2018, Tymosiak signed for Górnik Łęczna.

== Honours ==
Motor Lublin

- III liga Lublin–Subcarpathia: 2015–16
- Polish Cup (Lublin subdistrict regionals); 2015–16, 2016–17

Górnik Łęczna

- II liga: 2019–20

Podhale Nowy Targ

- Polish Cup (Lesser Poland regionals): 2023–24
