= 2021 Polish Super Cup =

Football competition

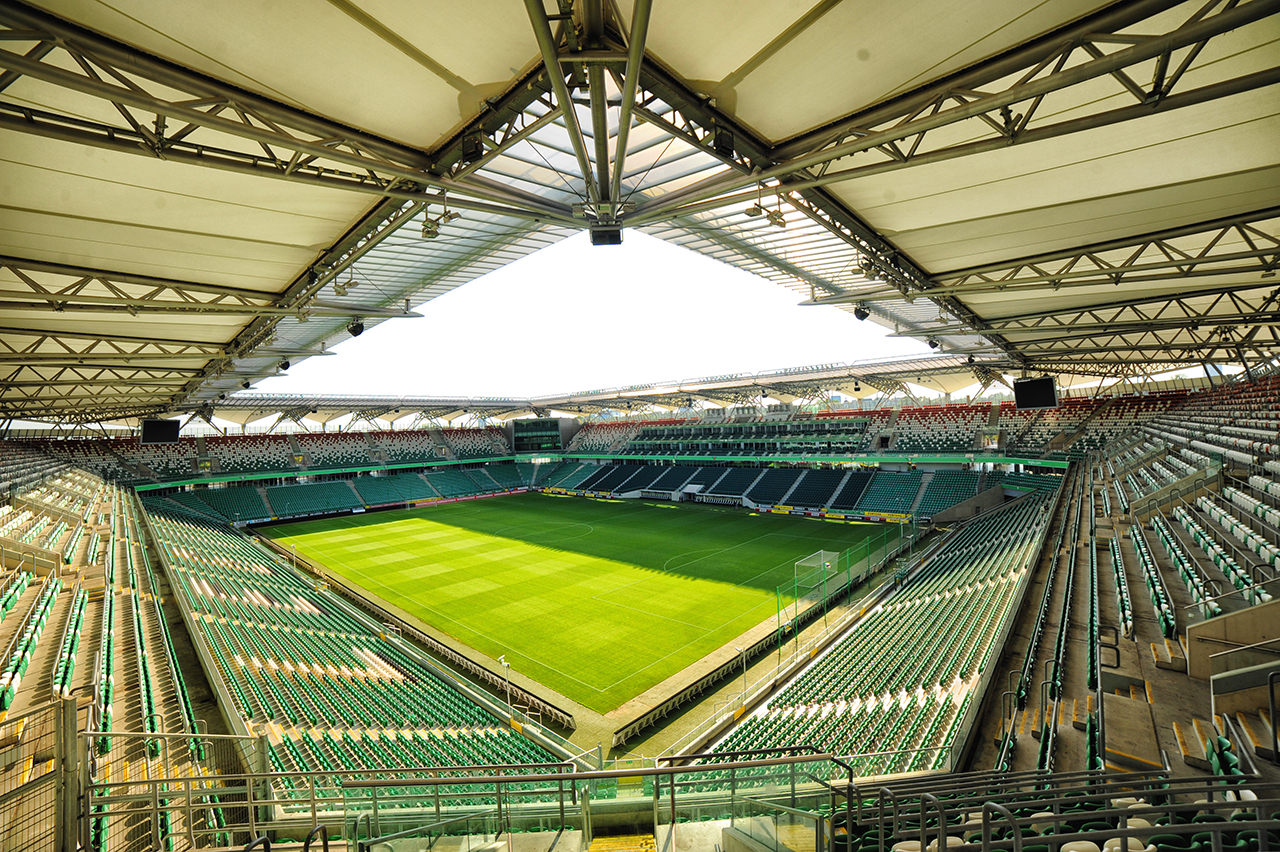
- The Polish Army Stadium in Warsaw hosted the final.
Legia Warsaw	Raków Częstochowa
1	1
- Raków Częstochowa won 4–3 on penalties
- Date: 17 July 2021
- Venue: Stadion Wojska Polskiego, Warsaw
- Referee: Damian Sylwestrzak (Wrocław)
- Attendance: 10,870
- Weather: 26 °C (79 °F)

The 2021 Polish Super Cup was the 30th Polish Super Cup, an annual Polish football match played between the reigning winners of the Ekstraklasa and Polish Cup. The Ekstraklasa champions Legia Warsaw faced Polish Cup winners Raków Częstochowa.

Raków played their first ever Super Cup match, while Legia was playing to win their fifth Super Cup.

Cracovia were the defending champions, but failed to qualify to the match indicated.

The match finished with a 1–1 draw after regular time. There was no extra-time played. Raków won 4–3 on penalties.

== Match ==
17 July 2021
20:00 CEST (UTC+02:00)

Legia Warsaw	1–1	Raków Częstochowa
Emreli 90+3'	Report	Tudor 10'
Penalties
Pekhart (penalty scored); Kapustka (penalty missed); Emreli (penalty missed); Juranović (penalty scored); Mladenović (penalty scored)	3–4	(penalty scored) Petrášek; (penalty scored) Ivi López; (penalty missed) Arsenić; (penalty scored) Arak; (penalty scored) Rundić

Stadion Wojska Polskiego, Warsaw
Attendance: 10,870
Referee: Damian Sylwestrzak (Wrocław)

GK	35	(Poland) Cezary Miszta	(yellow card) 85'
RCB	29	(Mauritius) Lindsay Rose	(yellow card) 44'	(substituted off) 58'
CB	4	(Poland) Mateusz Wieteska (c)
LCB	3	(Poland) Mateusz Hołownia	(yellow card) 73'
RM	2	(Croatia) Josip Juranović	(yellow card) 78'
RCM	8	(Portugal) André Martins
LCM	99	(Poland) Bartosz Slisz	(yellow card) 28'	(substituted off) 58'
LM	25	(Serbia) Filip Mladenović
RW	20	(Albania) Ernest Muçi		(substituted off) 58'
LW	21	(Portugal) Rafael Lopes		(substituted off) 58'
CF	9	(Czech Republic) Tomáš Pekhart
Substitutes:
GK	1	(Poland) Artur Boruc
DF	6	(Sweden) Mattias Johansson
DF	23	(Israel) Joel Abu Hanna
MF	22	(Poland) Kacper Skibicki		(substituted on) 58'
MF	67	(Poland) Bartosz Kapustka	(yellow card) 77'	(substituted on) 58'
MF	82	(Brazil) Luquinhas		(substituted on) 58'
FW	11	(Azerbaijan) Mahir Emreli		(substituted on) 58'
Manager:
(Poland) Czesław Michniewicz

GK	1	(Bosnia and Herzegovina) Vladan Kovačević
RCB	24	(Croatia) Zoran Arsenić
CB	6	(Poland) Andrzej Niewulis (c)	(yellow card) 59'
LCB	3	(Serbia) Milan Rundić
RM	7	(Croatia) Fran Tudor		(substituted off) 65'
RCM	8	(United States) Ben Lederman		(substituted off) 86'
LCM	66	(Greece) Giannis Papanikolaou
LM	23	(Poland) Patryk Kun
RW	77	(Poland) Marcin Cebula	(yellow card) 68'	(substituted off) 77'
LW	43	(Slovenia) David Tijanić		(substituted off) 69'
CF	9	(Poland) Sebastian Musiolik		(substituted off) 83'
Substitutes:
GK	12	(Poland) Kacper Trelowski
DF	2	(Czech Republic) Tomáš Petrášek		(substituted on) 77'
DF	31	(Serbia) Žarko Udovičić
MF	11	(Spain) Ivi		(substituted on) 69'
MF	17	(Poland) Mateusz Wdowiak		(substituted on) 65'
MF	20	(Serbia) Marko Poletanović		(substituted on) 86'
FW	18	(Poland) Jakub Arak		(substituted on) 83'
Manager:
(Poland) Marek Papszun

Match rules

- 90 minutes.
- Penalty shoot-out if scores still level.
- Seven named substitutes.
- Maximum of five substitutions.

== See also ==
- 2021–22 Ekstraklasa
- 2021–22 Polish Cup
