= Petr Schwarz =

Czech footballer

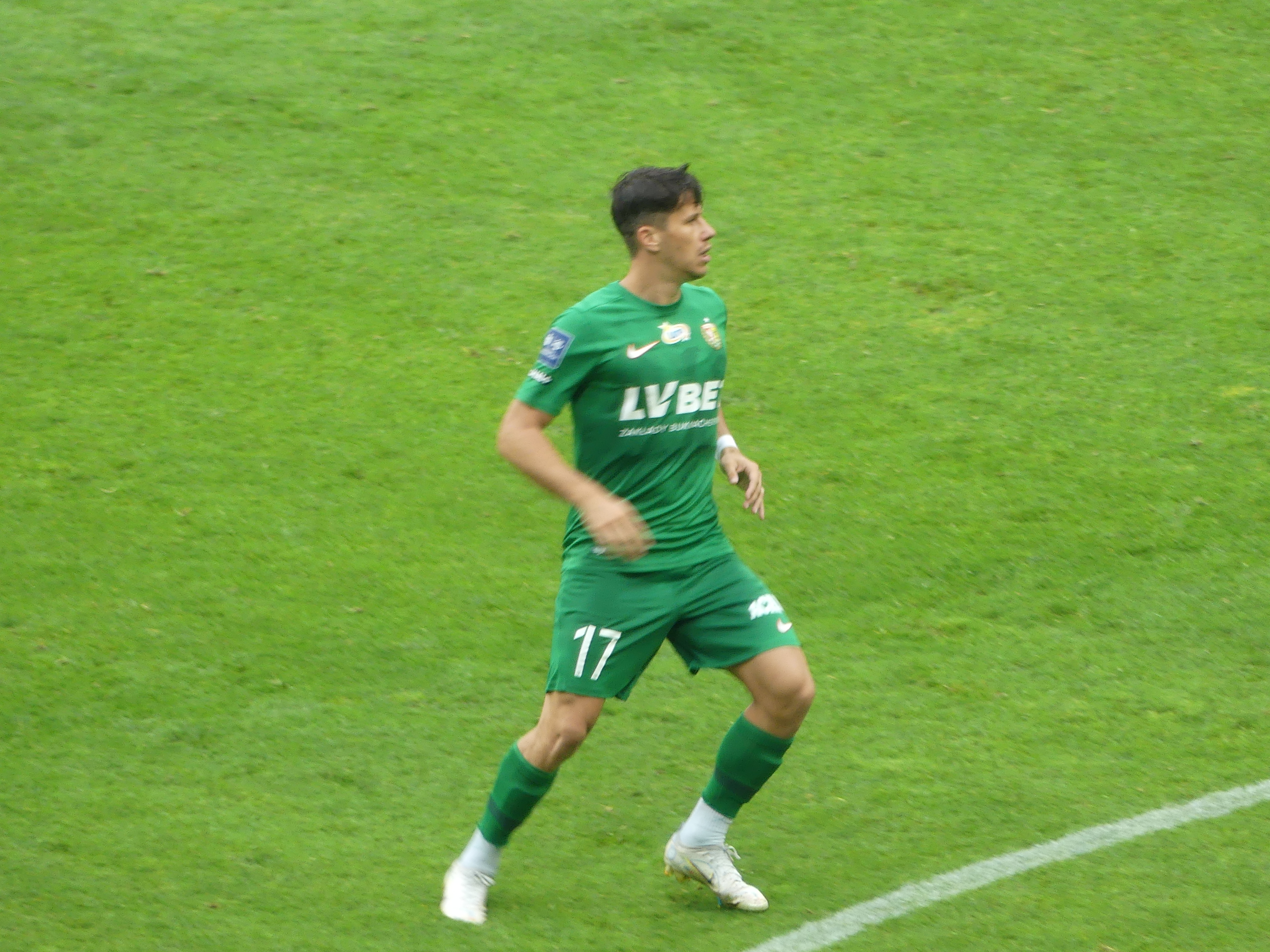
- Schwarz with Śląsk Wrocław in 2022

Personal information
- Date of birth: 12 November 1991 (age 34)
- Place of birth: Náchod, Czechoslovakia
- Height: 1.74 m (5 ft 9 in)
- Position: Midfielder

Youth career
- 1999–2001: Jiskra Machov
- 2001–2002: Spartak Police nad Metují
- 2002–2007: Náchod-Deštné
- 2007–2011: Hradec Králové

Senior career*
Years	Team	Apps	(Gls)
2011–2018	Hradec Králové	95	(13)
2018–2021	Raków Częstochowa	93	(13)
2021–	Śląsk Wrocław	115	(13)
Total		303	(39)

International career
2022	Czech Republic	2	(0)
- * Club domestic league appearances and goals

Petr Schwarz (born 12 November 1991) is a Czech former professional footballer who played as a midfielder. Besides the Czech Republic, he has played in Poland.

== Career statistics ==
=== International ===
Appearances and goals by national team and year
National team	Year	Apps	Goals
Czech Republic
Czech Republic	2022	2	0
Total		2	0

== Honours ==
Raków Częstochowa

- I liga: 2018–19
- Polish Cup: 2020–21
