= Andrzej Niewulis =

Polish footballer (born 1989)

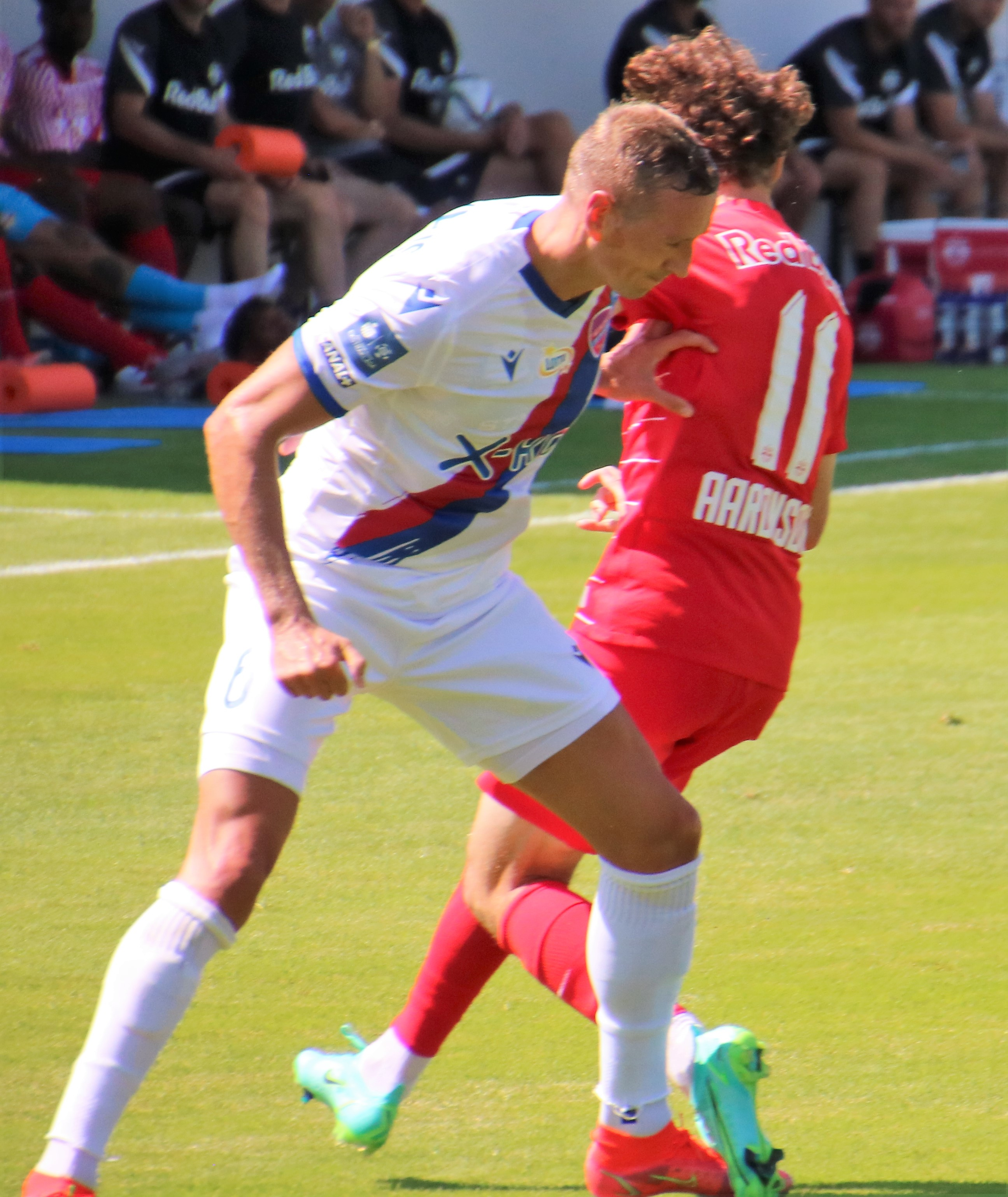
- Niewulis playing for Raków Częstochowa in 2021

Personal information
- Full name: Andrzej Niewulis
- Date of birth: 21 April 1989 (age 37)
- Place of birth: Suwałki, Poland
- Height: 1.87 m (6 ft 1 1/2 in)
- Position: Centre-back

Team information
- Current team: Raków Częstochowa (assistant)

Youth career
- –2002: Wigry Suwałki
- 2002–2006: UKS SMS Łódź

Senior career*
| Years | Team | Apps | (Gls) |
| 2006–2007 | UKS SMS Bałucz | | |
| 2007–2009 | Wigry Suwałki | 49 | (4) |
| 2007 | → Widzew Łódź (loan) | 0 | (0) |
| 2008 | → GKS Bełchatów (loan) | 0 | (0) |
| 2009–2012 | Jagiellonia Białystok | 2 | (0) |
| 2010–2011 | → Ruch Radzionków (loan) | 13 | (0) |
| 2011–2012 | → Wigry Suwałki (loan) | 22 | (0) |
| 2012–2013 | Stomil Olsztyn | 8 | (1) |
| 2013 | Dolcan Ząbki | 0 | (0) |
| 2014–2017 | Znicz Pruszków | 97 | (7) |
| 2017–2023 | Raków Częstochowa | 103 | (14) |
| 2023–2024 | Miedź Legnica | 33 | (1) |
| 2024–2026 | Zagłębie Sosnowiec | 23 | (3) |
- * Club domestic league appearances and goals

Andrzej Niewulis (born 21 April 1989) is a Polish former professional footballer who played as a centre-back. He is currently an assistant manager of Ekstraklasa club Raków Częstochowa.

== Career ==
In June 2010, he was loaned to Ruch Radzionków from Jagiellonia Białystok. He returned one year later. In July 2011, he was loaned to Wigry Suwałki.

In June 2026, Niewulis retired from professional football and returned to Raków Częstochowa as an assistant coach to Dawid Kroczek.

== Honours ==
Jagiellonia Białystok

- Polish Cup: 2009–10

Raków Częstochowa

- Ekstraklasa: 2022–23
- I liga: 2018–19
- Polish Cup: 2020–21, 2021–22
- Polish Super Cup: 2021

Individual

- I liga Player of the Year: 2018
