= 2021–22 Polish Cup =

Fortuna Puchar Polski

Tournament details
- Country: Poland
- Dates: 4 August 2021 – 2 May 2022
- Teams: 69

Final positions
- Champions: Raków Częstochowa (2nd title)
- Runners-up: Lech Poznań
- Conference League: Raków Częstochowa

Tournament statistics
- Matches played: 67
- Goals scored: 201 (3 per match)
- Top goal scorer(s): Jakub Bojas; Maciej Firlej; Mateusz Wdowiak (4 goals each)

The 2021–22 Polish Cup was the 68th season of the annual Polish football knockout tournament. It began on 4 August 2021 with the first matches of the preliminary round and ended with the final on 2 May 2022 at Stadion Narodowy. The 2021–22 edition of the Polish Cup was sponsored by Fortuna, making the official name Fortuna Puchar Polski. Winners of the competition qualified for the qualifying round of the 2022–23 UEFA Europa Conference League.

The defending champions were Raków Częstochowa. Raków successfully defended their title by defeating Lech Poznań 3–1 in the final.

== Participating teams ==
Teams starting the competition from Round of 64				Teams starting the competition from Preliminary round
2020–21 Ekstraklasa; 16 teams	2020–21 I liga 18 teams	2020–21 II liga 9 teams (position 1-9)	Winners of 16 regional cup competitions 16 teams	2020–21 II liga 10 teams (position 10-19)
Legia Warsaw; Raków Częstochowa; Pogoń Szczecin; Śląsk Wrocław; Warta Poznań; Piast Gliwice; Lechia Gdańsk; Zagłębie Lubin; Jagiellonia Białystok; Górnik Zabrze; Lech Poznań; Wisła Płock; Wisła Kraków; Cracovia; Stal Mielec; Podbeskidzie Bielsko-Biała	Radomiak Radom; Bruk-Bet Termalica Nieciecza; GKS Tychy; Arka Gdynia; ŁKS Łódź; Górnik Łęczna; Miedź Legnica; Odra Opole; Widzew Łódź; Sandecja Nowy Sącz; Chrobry Głogów; Korona Kielce; Puszcza Niepołomice; GKS Jastrzębie; Stomil Olsztyn; Resovia; Zagłębie Sosnowiec; GKS Bełchatów	Górnik Polkowice; GKS Katowice; Chojniczanka Chojnice; Wigry Suwałki; KKS Kalisz; Skra Częstochowa; Garbarnia Kraków; Śląsk Wrocław II; Motor Lublin	Ślęza Wrocław (dolnośląskie); Włocłavia Włocławek (kujawsko-pomorskie); Orlęta Radzyń Podlaski (lubelskie); Lechia Zielona Góra (lubuskie); Unia Skierniewice (łódzkie); Wieczysta Kraków (małopolskie); Świt Nowy Dwór Mazowiecki (mazowieckie); Ruch Zdzieszowice (opolskie); Wisłoka Dębica (podkarpackie); Olimpia Zambrów (podlaskie); Powiśle Dzierzgoń (pomorskie); Rekord Bielsko-Biała (śląskie); KSZO Ostrowiec Świętokrzyski (świętokrzyskie); Concordia Elbląg (warmińsko-mazurskie); Polonia Środa Wielkopolska (wielkopolskie); Świt Szczecin (zachodniopomorskie)	Stal Rzeszów; Sokół Ostróda; Hutnik Kraków; Pogoń Siedlce; Lech Poznań II; Znicz Pruszków; Olimpia Elbląg; Olimpia Grudziądz; Błękitni Stargard; Bytovia Bytów

== Prize money ==
The PZPN Board of Directors determined the size of the prizes.

Round reached	Amount
Round of 64	regional cup winner: 40,000 PLN remainder teams: 15,000 PLN
Round of 32	45,000 PLN
Round of 16	90,000 PLN
Quarterfinal	190,000 PLN
Semifinal	380,000 PLN
Final	760,000 PLN
Winner	5,000,000 PLN

== Round and draw dates ==
Round	Draw date	Number of teams	Date of matches	Teams entered for the competition
Preliminary round	None	69 → 64	4 August 2021	• 2020–21 II liga teams from positions 10–19.
Round of 64	12 August 2021	64 → 32	22–29 September 2021	• 2020–21 Ekstraklasa teams, • 2020–21 I liga teams, • 2020–21 II liga teams from positions 1–9, • 16 winners of the regional cups.
Round of 32	1 October 2021	32 → 16	26 October - 3 November 2021	None
Round of 16	5 November 2021	16 → 8	30 November 2021 - 9 February 2022	None
Quarter-finals	3 December 2021	8 → 4	1–2 March 2022	None
Semi-finals	4 March 2022	4 → 2	5–6 April 2022	None
Final	None	2	2 May 2022	None

== Preliminary round ==
The matches were played on 4 August 2021. Participating in this round were the 10 lowest ranked teams from 2020–21 II liga (which finished 2020–21 season on positions 10-19). With reference to the competition regulations, the matches were played according to the following scheme: 10th team of 2020–21 season will be a host of match against 19th team, 11th team will be a host of match against 18th team, 12th team will be a host of match against 17th team, 13th team will be a host of match against 16th team and 14th team will be a host of match against 15th team.

Team 1	Score	Team 2
4 August 2021
Stal Rzeszów (3)	4–1	Bytovia Bytów (5)
Sokół Ostróda (3)	4–2 (a.e.t.)	Błękitni Stargard (4)
Hutnik Kraków (3)	0–1	Olimpia Grudziądz (4)
Pogoń Siedlce (3)	3–0 (w/o)	Olimpia Elbląg (3)
Lech Poznań II (3)	2–0 (a.e.t.)	Znicz Pruszków (3)

4 August 2021	Hutnik Kraków	0–1	Olimpia Grudziądz	Kraków
16:00 CEST (UTC+02:00)		Report	Romero 7'	Stadium: Stadion Miejski Hutnika; Attendance: 800; Referee: Rafał Rokosz (Katowice)

4 August 2021	Lech Poznań II	2–0 (a.e.t.)	Znicz Pruszków	Wronki
16:00 CEST (UTC+02:00)	Spławski 116'; Kołtański 120'	Report		Stadium: Stadion Miejski; Attendance: 0 Referee: Paweł Horożaniecki (Żary)

4 August 2021	Sokół Ostróda	4–2 (a.e.t.)	Błękitni Stargard	Ostróda
17:00 CEST (UTC+02:00)	Skórecki 52'; Rugowski 87', 91', 104'	Report	Prawucki 2'; Lis 76'	Stadium: Stadion Miejski; Referee: Patryk Gryckiewicz (Toruń)

4 August 2021	Pogoń Siedlce	3–0 (w/o)	Olimpia Elbląg	Siedlce
17:00 CEST (UTC+02:00)		Report	Sienkiewicz 14'; Guilherme 61'; Kurbiel 68'	Stadium: Stadion Miejski; Attendance: 617; Referee: Piotr Rzucidło (Warsaw)
Note: Polish Football Association awarded Pogoń Siedlce a 3–0 win as a result of Olimpia Elbląg fielding the ineligible player.

4 August 2021	Stal Rzeszów	4–1	Bytovia Bytów	Rzeszów
19:00 CEST (UTC+02:00)	Michalik 25', 44'; Prokić 26'; Głowacki 42' (pen.)	Report	Kaydrovych 80'	Stadium: Stadion Miejski Stali; Referee: Piotr Szypuła (Bielsko-Biała)

== Round of 64 ==
The draw for this round was conducted in the headquarter of PZPN on 12 August 2021. The matches were played from 21 to 29 September 2021. Participating in this round were the 5 winners from the previous round, 16 teams from the 2020–21 Ekstraklasa, 18 teams from the 2020–21 I liga, 9 highest ranked teams from 2020–21 II liga and 16 winners of the regional cup competitions. Games were hosted by teams playing in the lower division in the 2021–22 season or by first drawn team in a case of match between clubs from the same division.

Team 1	Score	Team 2
21 September 2021
KKS Kalisz (3)	2–1	Pogoń Szczecin (1)
Śląsk Wrocław II (3)	0–3	Zagłębie Lubin (1)
Ruch Zdzieszowice (5)	0–6	Zagłębie Sosnowiec (2)
Jagiellonia Białystok (1)	1–3	Lechia Gdańsk (1)
Polonia Środa Wielkopolska (4)	0–2	GKS Jastrzębie (2)
22 September 2021
Stal Rzeszów (3)	2–4	Raków Częstochowa (1)
Wigry Suwałki (3)	1–3	Legia Warsaw (1)
Concordia Elbląg (5)	0–2	Unia Skierniewice (4)
Orlęta Radzyń Podlaski (4)	2–3	Lechia Zielona Góra (4)
Korona Kielce (2)	4–3 (a.e.t.)	Wisła Płock (1)
Włocłavia Włocławek (5)	0–2	Piast Gliwice (1)
Stal Mielec (1)	1–3	Wisła Kraków (1)
Ślęza Wrocław (4)	3–2	Chojniczanka Chojnice (3)
Motor Lublin (3)	1–0	Podbeskidzie Bielsko-Biała (2)
Miedź Legnica (2)	4–0	Odra Opole (2)
Górnik Zabrze (1)	2–0	Radomiak Radom (1)
23 September 2021
Śląsk Wrocław (1)	0–1	Bruk-Bet Termalica Nieciecza (1)
ŁKS Łódź (2)	0–0 (a.e.t.) (3–1 p)	Cracovia (1)
28 September 2021
KSZO Ostrowiec Świętokrzyski (4)	1–2	GKS Tychy (2)
Skra Częstochowa (2)	0–3	Lech Poznań (1)
Górnik Polkowice (2)	1–2	Górnik Łęczna (1)
29 September 2021
Sokół Ostróda (3)	0–3 (w/o)	Pogoń Siedlce (3)
Świt Nowy Dwór Mazowiecki (4)	4–3 (a.e.t.)	Rekord Bielsko-Biała (4)
Wisłoka Dębica (4)	0–0 (a.e.t.) (6–7 p)	Świt Szczecin (4)
Wieczysta Kraków (5)	2–1	Chrobry Głogów (2)
Olimpia Zambrów (5)	0–1	GKS Katowice (2)
Stomil Olsztyn (2)	1–0	Sandecja Nowy Sącz (2)
Lech Poznań II (3)	2–1	Puszcza Niepołomice (2)
Resovia (2)	1–2	Widzew Łódź (2)
Olimpia Grudziądz (4)	2–0	Warta Poznań (1)
GKS Bełchatów (3)	0–5	Arka Gdynia (2)
Powiśle Dzierzgoń (6)	0–3	Garbarnia Kraków (3)

21 September 2021	Ruch Zdzieszowice	0–6	Zagłębie Sosnowiec	Zdzieszowice
15:00 CEST (UTC+02:00)		Łączy nas piłka 90minut	Sobczak 10' (pen.), 42', 49'; Smoleń 36'; Pawłowski 79', 90+3'	Stadium: Stadion Miejski; Attendance: 210; Referee: Kornel Paszkiewicz (Wrocław)

21 September 2021	Polonia Środa Wielkopolska	0–2	GKS Jastrzębie	Środa Wielkopolska
15:30 CEST (UTC+02:00)		Łączy nas piłka 90minut	Balboa 37'; Gajda 60'	Stadium: Stadion Miejski; Attendance: 430; Referee: Paweł Horożaniecki (Żary)

21 September 2021	Jagiellonia Białystok	1–3	Lechia Gdańsk	Białystok
17:30 CEST (UTC+02:00)	Černych 64'	Łączy nas piłka 90minut	Gajos 27'; Zwoliński 39', 50'	Stadium: Stadion Miejski; Attendance: 4,274; Referee: Tomasz Kwiatkowski (Warsaw)

21 September 2021	KKS Kalisz	2–1	Pogoń Szczecin	Kalisz
18:00 CEST (UTC+02:00)	Kendzia 27'; Zawistowski 33'	Łączy nas piłka 90minut	Bartkowski 24'	Stadium: Stadion Miejski; Attendance: 2,123; Referee: Paweł Malec (Łódź)

21 September 2021	Śląsk Wrocław II	0–3	Zagłębie Lubin	Wrocław
20:00 CEST (UTC+02:00)		Łączy nas piłka 90minut	Szysz 41'; Zajíc 42'; Podliński 66'	Stadium: Stadion Oporowska; Attendance: 783; Referee: Daniel Kruczyński (Żywiec)

22 September 2021	Górnik Zabrze	2–0	Radomiak Radom	Zabrze
14:30 CEST (UTC+02:00)	Toshevski 39'; Jiménez 80'	Łączy nas piłka 90minut		Stadium: Stadion Miejski im. Ernesta Pohla; Attendance: 3,318; Referee: Bartosz Frankowski (Toruń)

22 September 2021	Orlęta Radzyń Podlaski	2–3	Lechia Zielona Góra	Radzyń Podlaski
15:30 CEST (UTC+02:00)	Koszel 23'; Maj 43'	Łączy nas piłka 90minut	Małecki 36'; Surożyński 45'; Król 64'	Stadium: Stadion Miejski; Attendance: 250; Referee: Mariusz Myszka (Stalowa Wola)

22 September 2021	Concordia Elbląg	0–2	Unia Skierniewice	Elbląg
16:00 CEST (UTC+02:00)		Łączy nas piłka 90minut	Kłąb 37'; Wojciechowski 80'	Stadium: Stadion Miejski; Attendance: 270; Referee: Filip Kaliszewski (Gdańsk)

22 September 2021	Ślęza Wrocław	3–2	Chojniczanka Chojnice	Wrocław
16:00 CEST (UTC+02:00)	Stępień 38', 68'; Stempin 62'	Łączy nas piłka 90minut	Skrzypczak 54'; Pląskowski 65' (pen.)	Stadium: Ślęza Training Center; Attendance: 300; Referee: Rafał Rokosz (Katowice)

22 September 2021	Wigry Suwałki	1–3	Legia Warsaw	Suwałki
17:30 CEST (UTC+02:00)	Michalski 40'	Łączy nas piłka 90minut	Kostorz 42'; Kastrati 65'; Emreli 80'	Stadium: Stadion Miejski; Attendance: 2,905; Referee: Krzysztof Jakubik (Siedlce)

22 September 2021	Motor Lublin	1–0	Podbeskidzie Bielsko-Biała	Lublin
19:00 CEST (UTC+02:00)	Firlej 15' (pen.)	Łączy nas piłka 90minut		Stadium: Arena Lublin; Attendance: 2,169; Referee: Radosław Trochimiuk (Ciechanów)

22 September 2021	Miedź Legnica	4–0	Odra Opole	Legnica
19:00 CEST (UTC+02:00)	Tront 13'; Zapolnik 23'; Lehaire 42'; Garcia 89'	Łączy nas piłka 90minut		Stadium: Stadion Miejski im. Orła Białego; Attendance: 1,138; Referee: Piotr Idzik (Poznań)

22 September 2021	Stal Rzeszów	2–4	Raków Częstochowa	Rzeszów
19:15 CEST (UTC+02:00)	Marczuk 47'; Głowacki 51' (pen.)	Łączy nas piłka 90minut	Wdowiak 13'; Niewulis 45'; Ivi 84'; Gutkovskis 90'	Stadium: Stadion Miejski; Attendance: 4,021; Referee: Sebastian Krasny (Kraków)

22 September 2021	Włocłavia Włocławek	0–2	Piast Gliwice	Włocławek
19:46 CEST (UTC+02:00)		Łączy nas piłka 90minut	Stojiljković 12'; Kądzior 53' (pen.)	Stadium: Stadion OSiR; Attendance: 2,000; Referee: Wojciech Krztoń (Olsztyn)

22 September 2021	Korona Kielce	4–3 (a.e.t.)	Wisła Płock	Kielce
20:00 CEST (UTC+02:00)	Malarczyk 7'; Błanik 84'; Sierpina 96'; Lewandowski 118'	Łączy nas piłka 90minut	Kolar 49'; Warchoł 61'; Walczak 120'	Stadium: Suzuki Arena; Attendance: 2,662; Referee: Marek Opaliński (Legnica)

22 September 2021	Stal Mielec	1–3	Wisła Kraków	Mielec
20:30 CEST (UTC+02:00)	Kliment 69' (o.g.)	Łączy nas piłka 90minut	Młyński 20'; Szota 24'; Yeboah 73' (pen.)	Stadium: Stadion Miejski; Attendance: 1,410; Referee: Łukasz Szczech (Warsaw)

23 September 2021	ŁKS Łódź	0–0 (a.e.t.) (3–1 p)	Cracovia	Łódź
17:30 CEST (UTC+02:00)		Łączy nas piłka 90minut		Stadium: Stadion Miejski im. Władysława Króla; Attendance: 3,092; Referee: Sebastian Jarzębak (Bytom)
	Penalties
	Tosik (penalty scored); Domínguez (penalty scored); Ibe-Torti (penalty scored)		(penalty missed) van Amersfoort; (penalty scored) Rivaldinho; (penalty missed) Rodin; (penalty missed) Kakabadze

23 September 2021	Śląsk Wrocław	0–1	Bruk-Bet Termalica Nieciecza	Wrocław
20:30 CEST (UTC+02:00)		Łączy nas piłka 90minut	Mešanović 3'	Stadium: Stadion Wrocław; Attendance: 3,780; Referee: Piotr Urban (Warsaw)

28 September 2021	Skra Częstochowa	0–3	Lech Poznań	Poznań
16:00 CEST (UTC+02:00)		Łączy nas piłka 90minut	Sobiech 17'; Douglas 57'; Kozubal 84'	Stadium: Stadion Miejski; Attendance: 3,622; Referee: Zbigniew Dobrynin (Łódź)

28 September 2021	Górnik Polkowice	1–2	Górnik Łęczna	Polkowice
18:00 CEST (UTC+02:00)	Bancewicz 35'	Łączy nas piłka 90minut	Krykun 90'; Mak 90+3' (pen.)	Stadium: Stadion Miejski; Attendance: 306; Referee: Sylwester Rasmus (Toruń)

28 September 2021	KSZO Ostrowiec Świętokrzyski	1–2	GKS Tychy	Ostrowiec Świętokrzyski
19:29 CEST (UTC+02:00)	Nawrot 21'	Łączy nas piłka 90minut	Nowak 45+1'; Jaroch 49'	Stadium: Miejski Stadion Sportowy "KSZO"; Attendance: 1,219; Referee: Paweł Kukla (Kraków)

29 September 2021	Lech Poznań II	2–1	Puszcza Niepołomice	Wronki
13:00 CEST (UTC+02:00)	Kołtański 49'; Gogół 52'	Łączy nas piłka 90minut	Włodarczyk 39'	Stadium: Stadion Amiki; Attendance: 0 Referee: Łukasz Ostrowski (Szczecin)

29 September 2021	Świt Nowy Dwór Mazowiecki	4–3 (a.e.t.)	Rekord Bielsko-Biała	Nowy Dwór Mazowiecki
15:00 CEST (UTC+02:00)	Długołęcki 7'; Sosnowski 23' (pen.); Kwiatkowski 85'; Basiuk 108'	Łączy nas piłka 90minut	Wróbel 35', 64'; Mucha 59'	Stadium: Stadion Miejski; Attendance: 137; Referee: Konrad Gąsiorowski (Biała Podlaska)

29 September 2021	Wisłoka Dębica	0–0 (a.e.t.) (6–7 p)	Świt Szczecin	Dębica
15:00 CEST (UTC+02:00)		Łączy nas piłka 90minut		Stadium: Stadion Wisłoki; Attendance: 850; Referee: Piotr Szypuła (Bielsko-Biała)
	Penalties
	Fedan (penalty missed); Łanucha (penalty scored); Kozłowski (penalty scored); Matofij (penalty scored); Zygmunt (penalty scored); Radwanek (penalty scored); Palonek (penalty scored); Cabała (penalty missed)		(penalty scored) Nagórski; (penalty missed) Ładziak; (penalty scored) Krawiec; (penalty scored) Kisły; (penalty scored) Baranowski; (penalty scored) Wojdak; (penalty scored) Kapelusz; (penalty scored) Kuzko

29 September 2021	GKS Bełchatów	0–5	Arka Gdynia	Bełchatów
15:00 CEST (UTC+02:00)		Łączy nas piłka 90minut	Memic 3'; Siemaszko 15', 45', 50'; Alemán 76' (pen.)	Stadium: GIEKSA Arena; Attendance: 503; Referee: Damian Gawęcki (Kielce)

29 September 2021	Wieczysta Kraków	2–1	Chrobry Głogów	Kraków
15:30 CEST (UTC+02:00)	Bąk 74', 86'	Łączy nas piłka 90minut	Tupaj 53'	Stadium: Stadion Wieczystej; Attendance: 999; Referee: Jacek Lis (Katowice)

29 September 2021	Olimpia Zambrów	0–1	GKS Katowice	Zambrów
15:30 CEST (UTC+02:00)		Łączy nas piłka 90minut	Kozłowski 49'	Stadium: Stadion Miejski; Attendance: 500; Referee: Grzegorz Kawałko (Białystok)

29 September 2021	Powiśle Dzierzgoń	0–3	Garbarnia Kraków	Dzierzgoń
15:45 CEST (UTC+02:00)		Łączy nas piłka 90minut	Kuczera 22', 41'; Malik 67'	Stadium: Stadion Miejski; Attendance: 256; Referee: Konrad Aluszyk (Toruń)

29 September 2021	Resovia	1–2	Widzew Łódź	Rzeszów
16:00 CEST (UTC+02:00)	Kubowicz 70' (pen.)	Łączy nas piłka 90minut	Guzdek 30'; Karasek 72'	Stadium: Stadion Miejski; Attendance: 1,107; Referee: Tomasz Wajda (Żywiec)

29 September 2021	Olimpia Grudziądz	2–0	Warta Poznań	Grudziądz
16:00 CEST (UTC+02:00)	Karankiewicz 62'; Warcholak 71'	Łączy nas piłka 90minut		Stadium: Bronisław Malinowski Stadium; Attendance: 450; Referee: Marcin Szczerbowicz (Olsztyn)

29 September 2021	Sokół Ostróda	0–3 (w/o)	Pogoń Siedlce	Ostróda
17:00 CEST (UTC+02:00)		Łączy nas piłka 90minut	Górski 54', 90+1'	Stadium: Stadion Miejski; Attendance: 118; Referee: Piotr Rzucidło (Warsaw)
Note: Polish Football Association awarded Pogoń Siedlce a 3–0 win as a result of Sokół Ostróda fielding the ineligible player.

29 September 2021	Stomil Olsztyn	1–0	Sandecja Nowy Sącz	Olsztyn
19:45 CEST (UTC+02:00)	Żwir 50'	Łączy nas piłka 90minut		Stadium: Stadion OSiR; Attendance: 795; Referee: Konrad Kiełczewski (Białystok)

== Round of 32 ==
The draw for this round was conducted in the headquarter of PZPN on 1 October 2021. The matches were played from 26 October to 3 November 2021. Participating in this round were the 32 winners from the previous round. Games were hosted by teams playing in the lower division in the 2021–22 season or by first drawn team in a case of match between clubs from the same division.

Team 1	Score	Team 2
26 October 2021
Świt Nowy Dwór Mazowiecki (4)	2–1	Lechia Gdańsk (1)
KKS Kalisz (3)	1–2	Raków Częstochowa (1)
Lechia Zielona Góra (4)	0–1	Arka Gdynia (2)
Unia Skierniewice (4)	0–2	Lech Poznań (1)
27 October 2021
ŁKS Łódź (2)	0–1	Zagłębie Lubin (1)
Olimpia Grudziądz (4)	3–0	Lech Poznań II (3)
GKS Katowice (2)	1–2 (a.e.t.)	Bruk-Bet Termalica Nieciecza (1)
Ślęza Wrocław (4)	1–2	Górnik Zabrze (1)
Pogoń Siedlce (3)	0–5	Motor Lublin (3)
Zagłębie Sosnowiec (2)	0–1	Piast Gliwice (1)
28 October 2021
Świt Szczecin (4)	0–1	Legia Warsaw (1)
2 November 2021
Widzew Łódź (2)	4–1	GKS Jastrzębie (2)
Wieczysta Kraków (5)	0–5	Garbarnia Kraków (3)
3 November 2021
GKS Tychy (2)	1–3	Wisła Kraków (1)
Korona Kielce (2)	2–1	Stomil Olsztyn (2)
Miedź Legnica (2)	2–2 (a.e.t.) (4–5 p)	Górnik Łęczna (1)

26 October 2021	Lechia Zielona Góra	0–1	Arka Gdynia	Zielona Góra
13:30 CEST (UTC+02:00)		Łączy nas piłka 90minut	Tomal 90+4'	Stadium: Stadion MOSiR; Attendance: 919; Referee: Sebastian Tarnowski (Wrocław)

26 October 2021	Unia Skierniewice	0–2	Lech Poznań	Skierniewice
13:30 CEST (UTC+02:00)		Łączy nas piłka 90minut	Ramírez 9'; Broniarek 21' (pen.)	Stadium: Stadion Miejski; Attendance: 966; Referee: Patryk Gryckiewicz (Toruń)

26 October 2021	Świt Nowy Dwór Mazowiecki	2–1	Lechia Gdańsk	Nowy Dwór Mazowiecki
15:45 CEST (UTC+02:00)	Gajewski 47'; Kowalczyk 63'	Łączy nas piłka 90minut	Durmuş 8' (pen.)	Stadium: Stadion Miejski; Attendance: 960; Referee: Grzegorz Kawałko (Białystok)

26 October 2021	KKS Kalisz	1–2	Raków Częstochowa	Kalisz
18:00 CEST (UTC+02:00)	Waleńcik 85'	Łączy nas piłka 90minut	Gvilia 37' (pen.); Wdowiak 45+1'	Stadium: Stadion Miejski; Attendance: 2,950; Referee: Zbigniew Dobrynin (Łódź)

27 October 2021	Pogoń Siedlce	0–5	Motor Lublin	Siedlce
13:00 CEST (UTC+02:00)		Łączy nas piłka 90minut	Firlej 8', 30', 32'; Rozmus 15'; Wójcik 53'	Stadium: Stadion Miejski; Attendance: 356; Referee: Filip Kaliszewski (Gdańsk)

27 October 2021	Ślęza Wrocław	1–2	Górnik Zabrze	Wrocław
13:30 CEST (UTC+02:00)	Pisarczuk 81' (pen.)	Łączy nas piłka 90minut	Sanogo 15'; Toševski 41'	Stadium: Ślęza Training Center; Attendance: 799; Referee: Sebastian Krasny (Kraków)

27 October 2021	Olimpia Grudziądz	3–0	Lech Poznań II	Grudziądz
14:00 CEST (UTC+02:00)	Cywiński 15'; Bojas 20'; Cabrera 90+5'	Łączy nas piłka 90minut		Stadium: Bronisław Malinowski Stadium; Attendance: 200; Referee: Radosław Trochimiuk (Ciechanów)

27 October 2021	Zagłębie Sosnowiec	0–1	Piast Gliwice	Sosnowiec
17:30 CEST (UTC+02:00)		Łączy nas piłka 90minut	Winciersz 18'	Stadium: Stadion Ludowy; Attendance: 1,110; Referee: Sebastian Jarzębak (Bytom)

27 October 2021	GKS Katowice	1–2 (a.e.t.)	Bruk-Bet Termalica Nieciecza	Katowice
19:30 CEST (UTC+02:00)	Samiec-Talar 84'	Łączy nas piłka 90minut	Mešanović 45'; Wlazło 117' (pen.)	Stadium: Stadion GKS Katowice; Attendance: 1,225; Referee: Marek Opaliński (Legnica)

27 October 2021	ŁKS Łódź	0–1	Zagłębie Lubin	Łódź
20:30 CEST (UTC+02:00)		Łączy nas piłka 90minut	Starzyński 8' (pen.)	Stadium: Stadion Miejski im. Władysława Króla; Attendance: 1,623; Referee: Łukasz Szczech (Warsaw)

28 October 2021	Świt Szczecin	0–1	Legia Warsaw	Szczecin
14:00 CEST (UTC+02:00)		Łączy nas piłka 90minut	Rose 35'	Stadium: Stadion MOSRiR; Attendance: 986; Referee: Dominik Sulikowski (Gdańsk)

2 November 2021	Wieczysta Kraków	0–5	Garbarnia Kraków	Kraków
12:30 CET (UTC+01:00)		Łączy nas piłka 90minut	Klec 12'; Morys 19' (pen.); Feliks 39'; Purcha 41'; Korbecki 64'	Stadium: Stadion Wieczystej; Attendance: 1,000; Referee: Tomasz Wajda (Żywiec)

2 November 2021	Widzew Łódź	4–1	GKS Jastrzębie	Łódź
16:00 CET (UTC+01:00)	Karasek 19'; Montini 33'; Kun 52'; Hanousek 90+3' (pen.)	Łączy nas piłka 90minut	Balboa 73'	Stadium: Stadion Miejski Widzewa; Attendance: 5,043; Referee: Wojciech Myć (Lublin)

3 November 2021	GKS Tychy	1–3	Wisła Kraków	Tychy
13:30 CET (UTC+01:00)	Grzeszczyk 55'	Łączy nas piłka 90minut	Młyński 24'; Brown Forbes 74', 76'	Stadium: Stadion Miejski; Attendance: 3,596; Referee: Paweł Pskit (Łódź)

3 November 2021	Korona Kielce	2–1	Stomil Olsztyn	Kielce
16:00 CET (UTC+01:00)	Podgórski 13'; Zebić 34'	Łączy nas piłka 90minut	Szramka 89'	Stadium: Suzuki Arena; Attendance: 1,972; Referee: Jacek Małyszek (Lublin)

3 November 2021	Miedź Legnica	2–2 (a.e.t.) (4–5 p)	Górnik Łęczna	Legnica
18:00 CET (UTC+01:00)	Śliwa 42'; Mijušković 87' (pen.)	Łączy nas piłka 90minut	Lokilo 80'; Banaszak 90+2'	Stadium: Stadion Miejski im. Orła Białego; Attendance: 1,547; Referee: Paweł Malec (Łódź)
	Penalties
	Mijušković (penalty scored); Azikiewicz (penalty scored); Matuszek (penalty scored); Tront (penalty scored); Chuca (penalty missed)		(penalty scored) Banaszak; (penalty scored) Leândro; (penalty scored) Midzierski; (penalty scored) Serrano; (penalty scored) Tymosiak

== Round of 16 ==
The draw for this round was conducted in the headquarter of PZPN on 5 November 2021. The matches will be played from 30 November to 2 December 2021. Participating in this round are the 16 winners from the previous round. Games will be hosted by teams playing in the lower division in the 2021–22 season or by first drawn team in a case of match between clubs from the same division.

Team 1	Score	Team 2
30 November 2021
Korona Kielce (2)	1–2	Górnik Łęczna (1)
Olimpia Grudziądz (4)	3–3 (a.e.t.) (4–2 p)	Świt Nowy Dwór Mazowiecki (4)
1 December 2021
Garbarnia Kraków (3)	0–4	Lech Poznań (1)
Motor Lublin (3)	1–2	Legia Warsaw (1)
Arka Gdynia (2)	2–1	Zagłębie Lubin (1)
Bruk-Bet Termalica Nieciecza (1)	0–2	Raków Częstochowa (1)
2 December 2021
Widzew Łódź (2)	1–3	Wisła Kraków (1)
9 February 2022
Piast Gliwice (1)	0–0 (a.e.t.) (2–4 p)	Górnik Zabrze (1)

30 November 2021	Olimpia Grudziądz	3–3 (a.e.t.) (4–2 p)	Świt Nowy Dwór Mazowiecki	Grudziądz
12:00 CET (UTC+01:00)	Bojas 71' (pen.), 76' (pen.); Witasik 118'	Łączy nas piłka 90minut	Michalik 21'; Sosnowski 37' (pen.), 95' (pen.)	Stadium: Bronisław Malinowski Stadium; Attendance: 200; Referee: Łukasz Karski (Słupsk)
	Penalties
	Warcholak (penalty scored); Cywiński (penalty scored); Wicki (penalty scored); Cabrera (penalty scored)		(penalty scored) Sosnowski; (penalty scored) Długołęcki; (penalty missed) Tkaczyk; (penalty missed) Kamiński

30 November 2021	Korona Kielce	1–2	Górnik Łęczna	Kielce
18:00 CET (UTC+01:00)	Błanik 25'	Łączy nas piłka 90minut	Rymaniak 67'; Śpiączka 82'	Stadium: Suzuki Arena; Attendance: 1,883; Referee: Tomasz Wajda (Żywiec)

1 December 2021	Garbarnia Kraków	0–4	Lech Poznań	Kraków
11:45 CET (UTC+01:00)		Łączy nas piłka 90minut	Marchwiński 16'; Banach 23' (o.g.); Czerwiński 32'; Murawski 64'	Stadium: Stadion RKS Garbarnia; Attendance: 820; Referee: Dominik Sulikowski (Gdańsk)

1 December 2021	Bruk-Bet Termalica Nieciecza	0–2	Raków Częstochowa	Nieciecza
14:30 CET (UTC+01:00)		Łączy nas piłka 90minut	Sturgeon 7'; Lederman 43'	Stadium: Stadion Sportowy Bruk-Bet Termalica; Attendance: 887; Referee: Jarosław Przybył (Kluczbork)

1 December 2021	Arka Gdynia	2–1	Zagłębie Lubin	Gdynia
17:15 CET (UTC+01:00)	Czubak 22', 32'	Łączy nas piłka 90minut	Ratajczyk 57'	Stadium: Stadion Miejski; Attendance: 2,929; Referee: Włodzimierz Bartos (Łódź)

1 December 2021	Motor Lublin	1–2	Legia Warsaw	Lublin
20:00 CET (UTC+01:00)	Fidziukiewicz 14'	Łączy nas piłka 90minut	Luquinhas 56'; Włodarczyk 73'	Stadium: Arena Lublin; Attendance: 14,914; Referee: Łukasz Kuźma (Białystok)

2 December 2021	Widzew Łódź	1–3	Wisła Kraków	Łódź
20:00 CET (UTC+01:00)	Kun 29'	Łączy nas piłka 90minut	Brown Forbes 64'; Kliment 86', 90'	Stadium: Stadion Miejski Widzewa; Attendance: 15,627; Referee: Paweł Raczkowski (Warsaw)

9 February 2022	Piast Gliwice	0–0 (a.e.t.) (2–4 p)	Górnik Zabrze	Gliwice
17:30 CET (UTC+01:00)		Łączy nas piłka 90minut		Stadium: Stadion Miejski im. Piotra Wieczorka; Attendance: 4,180; Referee: Sebastian Jarzębak (Bytom)
	Penalties
	Hateley (penalty missed); Kostadinov (penalty missed); Huk (penalty scored); Toril (penalty scored)		(penalty scored) Nowak; (penalty missed) Janža; (penalty scored) Janicki; (penalty scored) Manneh; (penalty scored) Dadok

== Quarter-finals ==
The draw for this round was conducted in the headquarter of PZPN on 3 December 2021. The matches will be played in March 2022. Participating in this round are the 8 winners from the previous round. Games will be hosted by teams playing in the lower division in the 2021–22 season or by first drawn team in a case of match between clubs from the same division.

Team 1	Score	Team 2
1 March 2022
Arka Gdynia (2)	0–2	Raków Częstochowa (1)
Olimpia Grudziądz (4)	1–1 (a.e.t.) (5–3 p)	Wisła Kraków (1)
2 March 2022
Legia Warsaw (1)	2–0	Górnik Łęczna (1)
Górnik Zabrze (1)	0–2	Lech Poznań (1)

1 March 2022	Olimpia Grudziądz	1–1 (a.e.t.) (5–3 p)	Wisła Kraków	Grudziądz
18:00 CET (UTC+01:00)	Bojas 2'	Report	Cissé 57'	Stadium: Bronisław Malinowski Stadium; Attendance: 2,500; Referee: Dominik Sulikowski (Gdańsk)

1 March 2022	Arka Gdynia	0–2	Raków Częstochowa	Gdynia
20:45 CET (UTC+01:00)		Report	Musiolik 20'; Gutkovskis 65'	Stadium: Stadion Miejski; Attendance: 4,820; Referee: Daniel Stefański (Bydgoszcz)

2 March 2022	Górnik Zabrze	0–2	Lech Poznań	Zabrze
18:00 CET (UTC+01:00)		Report	Amaral 31', 58'	Stadium: Arena Zabrze; Attendance: 12,087; Referee: Bartosz Frankowski (Toruń)

2 March 2022	Legia Warsaw	2–0	Górnik Łęczna	Warsaw
20:45 CET (UTC+01:00)	Josué 22'; Muçi 86'	Report		Stadium: Stadion Wojska Polskiego; Attendance: 6,529; Referee: Damian Kos (Gdańsk)

== Semi-finals ==
Participating in this round will be the 4 winners from the previous round.

Team 1	Score	Team 2
5 April 2022
Olimpia Grudziądz (4)	0–3	Lech Poznań (1)
6 April 2022
Raków Częstochowa (1)	1–0	Legia Warsaw (1)

5 April 2022	Olimpia Grudziądz	0–3	Lech Poznań	Grudziądz
18:00 CEST (UTC+02:00)		Report	Kownacki 26'; Douglas 49', 58'	Stadium: Bronisław Malinowski Stadium; Attendance: 3,300; Referee: Piotr Lasyk (Bytom)

6 April 2022	Raków Częstochowa	1–0	Legia Warsaw	Częstochowa
18:00 CEST (UTC+02:00)	Wdowiak 5'	Report		Stadium: Stadion Miejski; Attendance: 5,500; Referee: Tomasz Musiał (Kraków)

== Final ==
2 May 2022
16:00 CEST (UTC+02:00)

Lech Poznań	1–3	Raków Częstochowa
Amaral 52'	Report	Gutkovskis 6'; Wdowiak 36'; Ivi 77'

Stadion Narodowy, Warsaw
Attendance: 35,694
Referee: Szymon Marciniak (Płock)
