= Haris Memic =

Dutch footballer

Haris Memić
Personal information
- Date of birth: 26 March 1995 (age 31)
- Place of birth: Winterswijk, Netherlands
- Height: 1.90 m (6 ft 3 in)
- Position: Defender

Team information
- Current team: Excelsior '31

Youth career
- –2014: De Graafschap

Senior career*
Years	Team	Apps	(Gls)
2014–2015	TOP Oss	2	(0)
2015–2016	DESO		
2016	Dukla Banská Bystrica	15	(0)
2017	MFK Lokomotíva Zvolen	20	(0)
2018–2019	Lienden	23	(0)
2020	Bytovia Bytów	25	(0)
2021–2022	Arka Gdynia	24	(0)
2023–	Excelsior '31		
- * Club domestic league appearances and goals as of 26 March 2024

Haris Memić (born 26 March 1995) is a Dutch footballer who plays as a defender for Excelsior '31.

== Career ==
In 2014, Memić signed for Dutch second division side TOP Oss, where he made 2 league appearances and scored 0 goals.

In 2016, he left DESO in the Dutch lower leagues, before joining Slovak club Dukla Banská Bystrica.

In 2018, Memić signed for Lienden in the Dutch third division.

Before the second half of the 2019/20 campaign, he signed for Polish II liga outfit Bytovia Bytów after almost signing for a team in the United States.

Before the second half of the 2020/21 season, he signed for Polish I liga side Arka Gdynia.
