= Artur Siemaszko =

Polish footballer

Personal information
- Date of birth: 6 January 1997 (age 29)
- Place of birth: Olsztyn, Poland
- Height: 1.81 m (5 ft 11 in)
- Position: Forward

Team information
- Current team: Olimpia Grudziądz
- Number: 17

Youth career
- –2013: Stomil Olsztyn

Senior career*
Years	Team	Apps	(Gls)
2013–2019	Zagłębie Lubin II	63	(25)
2016–2019	Zagłębie Lubin	3	(0)
2017–2018	→ Stomil Olsztyn (loan)	29	(11)
2019	→ GKS Tychy (loan)	6	(0)
2019–2020	Stomil Olsztyn	28	(2)
2020–2023	Arka Gdynia	39	(1)
2022–2023	→ Puszcza Niepołomice (loan)	28	(4)
2023–2025	Puszcza Niepołomice	34	(5)
2025–	Olimpia Grudziądz	17	(3)

International career
2011	Poland U15	4	(0)
2013–2014	Poland U17	5	(3)
2016–2018	Poland U20	6	(1)
- * Club domestic league appearances and goals as of 16:03, 2 June 2026 (UTC)

Artur Siemaszko (born 6 January 1997) is a Polish professional footballer who plays as a forward for II liga club Olimpia Grudziądz.

== Career ==
On 17 June 2019, Siemaszko returned to Stomil Olsztyn on a permanent transfer.

On 31 July 2020, he signed a three-year contract with Arka Gdynia. On 30 June 2022, he was sent out on a one-year loan to Puszcza Niepołomice. On 8 July 2023, after earning promotion to Ekstraklasa with Puszcza, Siemaszko joined the team on a permanent basis until June 2025.

On 7 October 2025, Siemaszko joined II liga club Olimpia Grudziądz on a two-year deal.

== Honours ==
Zagłębie Lubin II

- IV liga Lower Silesia West: 2016–17
- Polish Cup (Lower Silesia regionals): 2016–17
- Polish Cup (Legnica regionals): 2016–17
