= GIEKSA Arena =

Football stadium in Bełchatów, Poland

Coordinates: 51°21′57.02″N 19°22′54.09″E

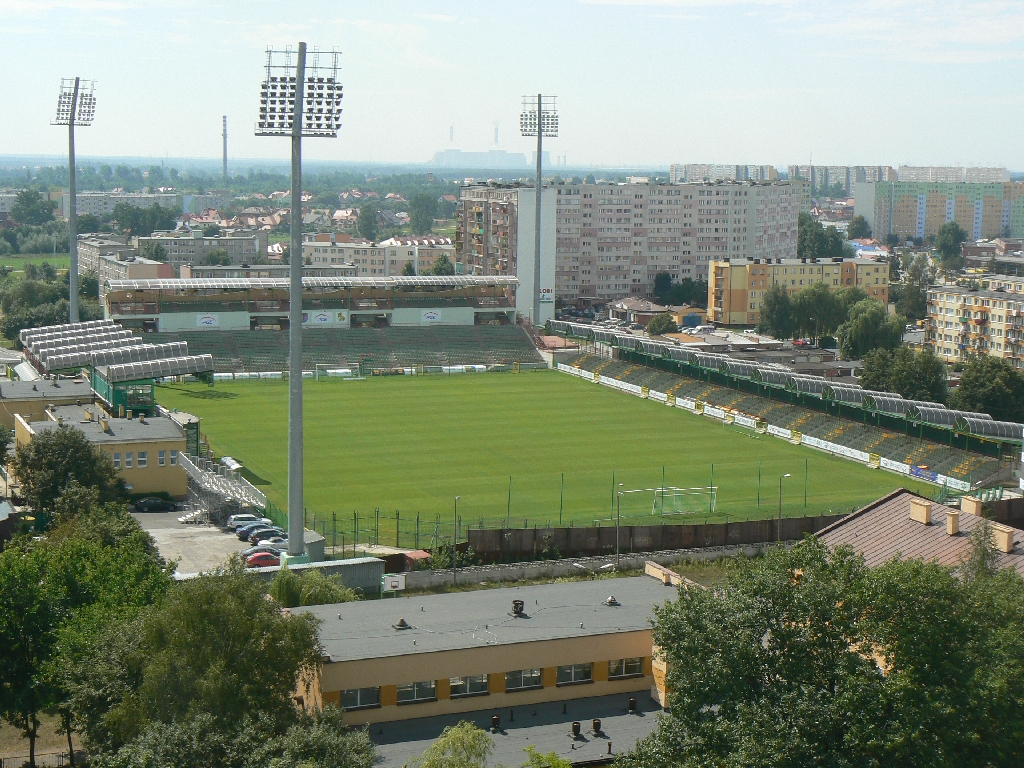
- Interactive map of GIEKSA Arena
- Full name: GIEKSA Arena
- Location: ul. Sportowa 3, 97-400 Bełchatów, Poland
- Operator: GKS Bełchatów
- Capacity: 5,264
- Surface: Grass
- Field size: 105 x 68 m

Construction
- Built: 1977
- Renovated: 2001–2009

Tenant
- GKS Bełchatów

GIEKSA Arena is a multi-purpose stadium in Bełchatów, Poland. It is currently used mostly for football matches and is the home stadium of GKS Bełchatów. The stadium has a capacity of 5,264 people. It was built in 1977 and renovated in 2001–2009.

For 2019–20 and 2020–21 seasons, the stadium was a home for the Ekstraklasa's and Polish Cup's Raków Częstochowa games. For 2021–22 and 2022-23 seasons, the stadium was a home for the I liga's and Polish Cup's Skra Częstochowa games.
