= Korona Kielce II =

- Nicknames: Scyzory (The Buck-Knives); Złocisto-Krwiści (The Golden-Blooded)
- Founded: 2003; 23 years ago
- Ground: Wojciech Szczepaniak Street Stadium
- Capacity: 6,000
- Chairman: Leszek Czarny
- Manager: Arkadiusz Adach
- League: III liga, group IV
- 2025–26: III liga, group IV, 4th of 18
- Website: www.korona-kielce.pl
Home colours	Away colours

Korona Kielce II is a Polish football team, which serves as the reserve side of Korona Kielce. In the 2026–27 season, they compete in group IV of the III liga. They participated in the Polish Cup in the 2009–10 and 2025–26 seasons.

== Honours ==
- II liga (3rd tier)
  - 6th place: 2006–07
- III liga (4th tier)
  - Champions: 2005–06 (Świętokrzyskie), 2008–09 (Lesser Poland-Świętokrzyskie)^{1}
- IV liga Świętokrzyskie (5th tier)
  - Champions: 2018–19, 2021–22, 2023–24
  - Runners-up: 2004–05
- Regional league Świętokrzyskie I (6th tier)
  - Champions: 2003–04
- Polish Cup (Świętokrzyskie regionals)
  - Winners: 2008–09, 2024–25, 2025–26
  - Runners-up: 2006–07, 2016–17, 2019–20

^{1}Due to the fact that Korona Kielce II could not be promoted to the central level, the promotion was won by the runners-up – LKS Nieciecza.

== Polish Cup records ==
Season	Round	Opponent	Result
2009–10	Preliminary round (I)	Ślęza Wrocław	3–0
2009–10	Preliminary round (II)	MKS Kluczbork	0–2
2025–26	First round (II)	Piast Gliwice	0–1
2026–27	First round (II)	Radomiak Radom	0–1
