= David Tijanić =

Slovenian footballer (born 1997)

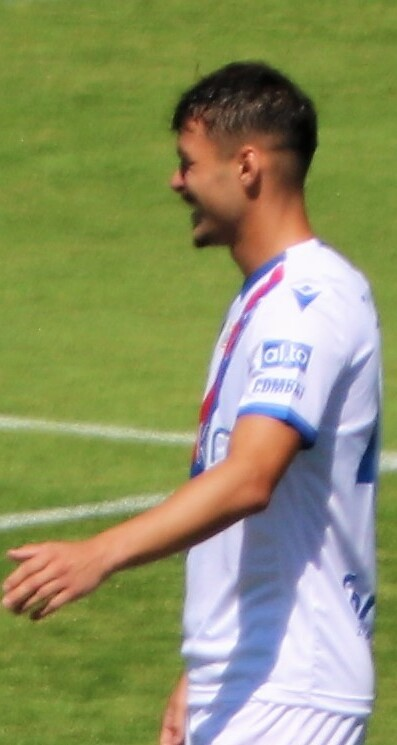
- Tijanić with Raków Częstochowa in 2021

Personal information
- Date of birth: 16 July 1997 (age 29)
- Place of birth: Ljubljana, Slovenia
- Height: 1.74 m (5 ft 9 in)
- Position: Midfielder

Team information
- Current team: Al-Adalah

Youth career
- –2012: Bravo
- 2012–2015: Interblock
- 2015–2016: Olimpija Ljubljana

Senior career*
Years	Team	Apps	(Gls)
2015–2017	Olimpija Ljubljana	8	(0)
2016–2017	→ Krka (loan)	15	(2)
2017–2020	Triglav Kranj	77	(14)
2020–2021	Raków Częstochowa	39	(7)
2021–2025	Göztepe	99	(14)
2023	→ Al-Adalah (loan)	18	(4)
2024	→ Al-Adalah (loan)	16	(5)
2025–2026	Al-Najma	28	(2)
2026–	Al-Adalah	0	(0)

International career
2013	Slovenia U17 (Note: Official competitive UEFA matches only.)	3	(2)
2015–2016	Slovenia U19	4	(1)
2018	Slovenia U21	2	(0)
2020	Slovenia	1	(0)
- * Club domestic league appearances and goals as of 17 September 2026

David Tijanić (born 16 July 1997) is a Slovenian professional footballer who plays as a midfielder for Saudi First Division League club Al-Adalah.

== Club career ==
Tijanić made his Slovenian PrvaLiga debut for Olimpija Ljubljana on 5 March 2017 in a game against Rudar Velenje.

On 2 May 2021, Tijanić scored the winning goal in the Polish Cup final, helping Raków Częstochowa to their first ever major honour.

On 14 January 2023, Tijanić joined Saudi Pro League club Al-Adalah on loan for the rest of the 2022–23 season. After spending the first part of the 2023–24 season with Turkish TFF First League side Göztepe, he was once again loaned to Al-Adalah in January 2024 for the remainder of the season.

== International career ==
Tijanić made his national team debut on 7 October 2020 in a friendly against San Marino.

== Career statistics ==
=== Club ===
As of match played 23 September 2024

Appearances and goals by club, season and competition
Club	Season	League			National cup (Note: Includes Slovenian Cup, Polish Cup, Turkish Cup)		Continental		Other		Total	
Club	Season	Division	Apps	Goals	Apps	Goals	Apps	Goals	Apps	Goals	Apps	Goals
Olimpija Ljubljana	2015–16	Slovenian PrvaLiga	0	0	1	0	—		—		1	0
Olimpija Ljubljana	2016–17	Slovenian PrvaLiga	8	0	—		0	0	—		8	0
Olimpija Ljubljana	2017–18	Slovenian PrvaLiga	0	0	—		0	0	—		0	0
Olimpija Ljubljana	Total		8	0	1	0	0	0	—		9	0
Krka (loan)	2016–17	Slovenian Second League	15	2	4	0	—		—		19	2
Triglav Kranj	2017–18	Slovenian PrvaLiga	24	2	2	0	—		2 (Note: Appearances in promotion/relegation play-offs)	0	28	2
Triglav Kranj	2018–19	Slovenian PrvaLiga	33	7	1	1	—		—		34	8
Triglav Kranj	2019–20	Slovenian PrvaLiga	20	5	2	0	—		—		22	5
Triglav Kranj	Total		77	14	5	1	—		2	0	84	15
Raków Częstochowa	2019–20	Ekstraklasa	11	1	0	0	—		—		11	1
Raków Częstochowa	2020–21	Ekstraklasa	28	6	5	2	—		—		33	8
Raków Częstochowa	2021–22	Ekstraklasa	0	0	—		0	0	1 (Note: Appearance in Polish Super Cup)	0	1	0
Raków Częstochowa	Total		39	7	5	2	0	0	1	0	45	9
Göztepe	2021–22	Süper Lig	33	4	3	0	—		—		36	4
Göztepe	2022–23	TFF First League	18	1	2	1	—		—		20	2
Göztepe	2023–24	TFF First League	16	4	2	0	—		—		18	4
Göztepe	2024–25	Süper Lig	5	0	0	0	—		—		5	0
Göztepe	Total		72	9	7	1	—		—		79	10
Al-Adalah (loan)	2022–23	Saudi Pro League	18	4	—		—		—		18	4
Al-Adalah (loan)	2023–24	Saudi First Division League	16	5	—		—		—		16	5
Al-Adalah (loan)	Total		34	9	—		—		—		34	9
Career total			245	41	22	4	0	0	3	0	270	45

== Honours ==
Olimpija Ljubljana

- Slovenian First League: 2015–16

Raków Częstochowa

- Polish Cup: 2020–21
- Polish Super Cup: 2021
