= IV liga Świętokrzyskie =

- Organising body: Świętokrzyskie Football Association
- Founded: 2000; 26 years ago
- Country: Poland
- Number of clubs: 18
- Level on pyramid: 5
- Promotion to: III liga, group IV
- Relegation to: Liga okręgowa
- Current champions: AKS 1947 Busko Zdrój (2nd title) (2025–26)
- Most championships: Korona Kielce II (4 titles)
- Sponsor(s): Keeza

IV liga Świętokrzyskie group (grupa świętokrzyska), also known as Keeza IV liga świętokrzyska for sponsorship reasons, is one of the groups of IV liga, the fifth level of Polish football league system. The current champions are Korona Kielce II.

The league was created in the 2000–01 season after introducing new administrative division of Poland. Until the end of the 2007–08 season, IV liga was the fourth tier of league system, which was changed with the formation of the Ekstraklasa as the top level league in Poland.

The clubs from the Świętokrzyskie Voivodeship compete in this group. The winner of the league is promoted to group IV of the III liga. The bottom teams are relegated to one of the Świętokrzyskie-based groups of the regional league.
