= 2020–21 Pogoń Szczecin season =

Pogoń Szczecin
2020-21 season
- Chairman: Jarosław Mroczek
- Manager: Kosta Runjaić
- Stadium: Stadion im. Floriana Krygiera, Szczecin
- Ekstraklasa: 3rd
- Polish Cup: Round of 16
- Top goalscorer: League: Michał Kucharczyk (6); All: Michał Kucharczyk (7)
- Lowest home attendance: 0
- Biggest win: 5–0 v Podhale Nowy Targ; Polish Cup
Home colours	Away colours	Third colours
- All statistics correct as of 18 May 2021.

In the 2020–21 season, Pogoń Szczecin competed in the Ekstraklasa and participated in this season's edition of the Polish Cup.

== Players ==
As of 1 October 2020

Note: Flags indicate national team as defined under FIFA eligibility rules; some limited exceptions apply. Players may hold more than one non-FIFA nationality.

No.	Pos.	Nation	Player
1	GK	CRO	Dante Stipica
2	DF	POL	Jakub Bartkowski
6	DF	POL	Bartłomiej Mruk
8	MF	POL	Damian Dąbrowski
9	FW	POL	Adam Frączczak (Captain)
10	FW	SLO	Luka Zahović
13	DF	GRE	Konstantinos Triantafyllopoulos
14	MF	POL	Kamil Drygas
15	DF	POL	Hubert Matynia
16	MF	FIN	Santeri Hostikka
17	FW	POL	Mariusz Fornalczyk
18	MF	POL	Michał Kucharczyk
19	FW	POL	Adrian Benedyczak
20	MF	AUT	Alexander Gorgon
22	DF	AUT	David Stec

No.	Pos.	Nation	Player
23	DF	AUT	Benedikt Zech
25	FW	SWE	Paweł Cibicki
26	GK	POL	Jakub Bursztyn
27	MF	POL	Sebastian Kowalczyk
28	MF	POR	Tomás Podstawski
33	DF	POL	Mariusz Malec
54	MF	POL	Maciej Żurawski
55	DF	POL	Igor Łasicki
61	MF	POL	Kacper Smolinski
63	FW	POL	Hubert Turski
64	MF	POL	Kacper Kozłowski
71	MF	POL	Marcel Wędrychowski
75	DF	POL	Filip Balcewicz
97	DF	POR	Luís Mata

== Competitions ==
=== Ekstraklasa ===
==== Standings ====
Pos	Team	Pld	W	D	L	GF	GA	GD	Pts	Qualification or relegation
1	Legia Warsaw (C)	30	19	7	4	48	24	+24	64	Qualification for the Champions League first qualifying round
2	Raków Częstochowa	30	17	8	5	46	25	+21	59	Qualification for the Europa Conference League second qualifying round (Note: Raków Częstochowa qualified for the Europa Conference League by winning the 2020–21 Polish Cup and also by finishing second in the Ekstraklasa. As a result, the berth reserved for third place was passed to the fourth-placed team from the 2020–21 Ekstraklasa.)
3	Pogoń Szczecin	30	15	7	8	36	23	+13	52	Qualification for the Europa Conference League second qualifying round
4	Śląsk Wrocław	30	11	10	9	36	32	+4	43 (Note: Head-to-head points: Śląsk Wrocław 6, Warta Poznań 0.)	Qualification for the Europa Conference League first qualifying round
5	Warta Poznań	30	13	4	13	33	32	+1	43	

Source: ekstraklasa.org
Rules for classification: 1) Points; 2) Head-to-head points; 3) Head-to-head goal difference; 4) Head-to-head goals scored; 5) Head-to-head away goals scored (only if between two teams); 6) Goal difference; 7) Goals scored; 8) Number of wins; 9) Number of away wins; 10) Fairplay ranking; 11) Draw
(C) Champions

==== Results summary ====
Overall								Home						Away					
Pld	W	D	L	GF	GA	GD	Pts	W	D	L	GF	GA	GD	W	D	L	GF	GA	GD
19	10	5	4	24	12	+12	35	5	4	0	11	3	+8	5	1	4	13	9	+4

Last updated: 28 February 2021.
Source: Soccerway

==== Matches ====
22 August 2020 1	Cracovia Kraków	2–1	Pogoń Szczecin	Kraków
15:00 CET	Álvarez (yellow card) 18' (goal) 58'; van Amersfoort (yellow card) 31'; Hanca 62'; Vestenický (yellow card) 90+1'	Summary	Dąbrowski (yellow card) 8'; Triantafyllopoulos (yellow card) 35'; Frączczak 57'; Matynia (yellow card) 77'	Stadium: Stadion Miejski im. Józefa Piłsudskiego; Attendance: 4,053; Referee: (Poland) Paweł Raczkowski

30 August 2020 2	Piast Gliwice	0–1	Pogoń Szczecin	Gliwice
12:30 CET	Lipski (yellow card) 45+2'; Świerczok (yellow card) 58'; Huk (yellow card) 85'	Summary	Gorgon 66'; Frączczak (yellow card) 87'; Smolinski (yellow card) 90+1'; Matynia (yellow card) 90+2'	Stadium: Stadion Miejski; Attendance: 2,578; Referee: (Poland) Daniel Stefański

13 September 2020 3	Pogoń Szczecin	2–2	Wisła Kraków	Szczecin
15:00 CET	Klemenz 8' (o.g.); Smolinski (yellow card) 38'; Gorgon (yellow card) 78'; Triantafyllopoulos 90+4'	Summary	Jean Carlos 3'; Sadlok (yellow card) 16'; Chuca 57'	Stadium: Stadion Miejski im. Floriana Krygiera; Attendance: 1,887; Referee: (Poland) Mariusz Zlotek

19 September 2020 4	Pogoń Szczecin	1–0	Śląsk Wrocław	Szczecin
17:30 CET	Matynia (yellow card) 12'; Dąbrowski (yellow card) 60'; Gorgon (yellow card) 80'; Kucharczyk 89' (pen.)	Summary	Tamás (yellow card) 61'; Pałaszewski (yellow card) 72'; Putnocký (yellow card) 86'; Szymon Lewkot (yellow card) 90+5'	Stadium: Stadion Miejski im. Floriana Krygiera; Attendance: 1,821; Referee: (Poland) Krzysztof Jakubik

19 October 2020 7	Lechia Gdańsk	0–1	Pogoń Szczecin	Gdańsk
19:30 BST	Kopacz (yellow card) 55'; Makowski (yellow card) 72'; Nalepa (yellow card) 75'	Summary	Alexander Gorgon 23'; Dąbrowski (yellow card) 65'; Luís Mata (yellow card) 78'; Stec (yellow card) 90+5'	Stadium: Stadion Gdańsk; Attendance: 0 Referee: (Poland) Szymon Marciniak
Note: COVID-19 pandemic in Poland

24 October 2020 8	Pogoń Szczecin	0–0	Legia Warsaw	Szczecin
20:00 CEST (UTC+2)		Report	Lewczuk (yellow card) 72'; Mladenović (yellow card) 80'; Rosołek (yellow card) 84'	Stadium: Stadion Florian Krygier; Attendance: 0 Referee: (Poland) Szymon Marciniak (Płock)
Note: COVID-19 pandemic in Poland

30 October 2020 6	Pogoń Szczecin	3–0	Jagiellonia Białystok	Szczecin
18:00 CEST (UTC+2)	Böðvarsson 29' (o.g.); Stec (yellow card) 40'; Kowalczyk 49' (pen.); Gorgon 69'	Report	Böðvarsson (yellow card) 31'	Stadium: Stadion Florian Krygier; Attendance: 0 Referee: (Poland) Damian Sylwestrzak
Note: COVID-19 pandemic in Poland

9 November 2020 10	Pogoń Szczecin	1–1	Podbeskidzie	Szczecin
18:00 CEST (UTC+2)	Kozłowski (yellow card) 45'; Benedyczak 72'; Gorgon (yellow card) 87'	Report	Biliński 29'; Sierpina (yellow card) 50'; Nowak (yellow card) 55'; Gach (yellow card) 76'	Stadium: Stadion Florian Krygier; Attendance: 0 Referee: (Poland) Jarosław Przybył
Note: COVID-19 pandemic in Poland

27 November 2020 11	Górnik Zabrze	2–1	Pogoń Szczecin	Zabrze
20:30 CEST (UTC+2)	Jesús Jiménez 32' (pen.); Nowak 60'; Evangelou (yellow card) 90+3'	Report	Maciej Żurawski 16'; Matynia (red card) 31'; Benedyczak (yellow card) 89'; Kowalczyk (yellow card) 90+3'	Stadium: Arena Zabrze; Attendance: 0 Referee: (Poland) Damian Sylwestrzak
Note: COVID-19 pandemic in Poland

2 December 2020 9	Wisła Płock	0–0	Pogoń Szczecin	Płock
18:00 CET	Lagator (yellow card) 16'; Rzeźniczak (yellow card) 26'	Report	Drygas (yellow card) 63'	Stadium: Kazimierz Górski's Płock City Stadium'; Attendance: 0 Referee: (Poland) Krzysztof Jakubik
Note: COVID-19 pandemic in Poland

7 December 2020 12	Pogoń Szczecin	2–0	Stal Mielec	Szczecin
18:00 CET	Zahović 42'; Drygas 56' (pen.)	Report	Łukasz Zjawiński (yellow card) 39'; Matras (yellow card) 49'; Chorbadzhiyski (yellow card) 56'	Stadium: Stadion Florian Krygier; Attendance: 0 Referee: (Poland) Tomasz Wajda
Note: COVID-19 pandemic in Poland

12 December 2020 13	Warta Poznań	1–2	Pogoń Szczecin	Grodzisk Wielkopolski
15:00 CET	Kieliba (yellow card) 22'; Jakóbowski 46'; Kuzdra (yellow card) 55'; Jakub Kiełb (yellow card) 89'	Report	Gorgon 7' (yellow card) 68'; Zahović 11'; Matynia (yellow card) 41'; Benedyczak (yellow card) 90+3'; Smolinski (yellow card) 90+4'	Stadium: Stadion Groclinu Dyskobolii; Attendance: 0 Referee: (Poland) Dominik Sulikowski
Note: COVID-19 pandemic in Poland

16 December 2020 5	Lech Poznań	0–4	Pogoń Szczecin	Poznań
20:30 CET	Crnomarković (yellow card) 44'; Kamiński (yellow card) 46'; Dani Ramírez (yellow card) 69'	Report	Rogne 2' (o.g.); Kowalczyk 39'; Drygas 45+7' (pen.); Tomás Podstawski 90+1'	Stadium: INEA Stadion; Attendance: 0 Referee: (Poland) Jarosław Przybył
Note: COVID-19 pandemic in Poland

19 December 2020 14	Pogoń Szczecin	1–0	Zagłębie Lubin	Szczecin
15:00 CET	Bartkowski (yellow card) 45+1'; Drygas (yellow card) 71'; Kozłowski (yellow card) 78'; Kucharczyk 90+6' (yellow card) 90+7'	Report	Żubrowski (yellow card) 13' (yellow-red card) 19'; Dražić (yellow card) 70'	Stadium: Stadion Florian Krygier; Attendance: 0 Referee: (Poland) Sebastian Jarzebak
Note: COVID-19 pandemic in Poland

29 January 2021 15	Raków Częstochowa	0–1	Pogoń Szczecin	Bełchatów
20:30 CET	Tudor (yellow card) 39'; Gutkovskis (yellow card) 53'; Niewulis (yellow card) 70'; Sapała (yellow card) 80'; Piątkowski (yellow card) 85'	Report	Kowalczyk (yellow card) 39'; Benedyczak 58'; Zahović (yellow card) 90+3'	Stadium: Stadion GKS-u; Attendance: 0 Referee: (Poland) Jarosław Przybył
Note: COVID-19 pandemic in Poland

6 February 2021 16	Pogoń Szczecin	1–0	Cracovia Kraków	Szczecin
17:30 CET	Smolinski 43'; Kowalczyk (yellow card) 70'; Luís Mata (yellow card) 76'; Bursztyn (yellow card) 82'	Report	Thiago (yellow card) 31'	Stadium: Stadion Florian Krygier; Attendance: 0 Referee: (Poland) Bartosz Frankowski
Note: COVID-19 pandemic in Poland

13 February 2021 17	Pogoń Szczecin	0–0	Piast Gliwice	Szczecin
17:30 CET	Dąbrowski (yellow card) 16'; Kowalczyk (yellow card) 48'; Drygas (yellow card) 71'	Report	Chrapek (yellow card) 53'; Huk (yellow card) 86'; Pyrka (yellow card) 90+4'	Stadium: Stadion Florian Krygier; Attendance: 0 Referee: (Poland) Łukasz Szczech
Note: COVID-19 pandemic in Poland

19 February 2021 18	Wisła Kraków	2–1	Pogoń Szczecin	Kraków
20:30 CET	Zech 31' (o.g.); Burliga (yellow card) 35'; Sadlok (yellow card) 38'; Medved (yellow card) 43'; Brown Forbes 45+1'	Report	Gorgon (yellow card) 5' (goal) 48'; Zahović (yellow card) 28'; Bartkowski (yellow card) 64'; Zech (yellow card) 64'; Matynia (yellow card) 85'	Stadium: Stadion Miejski Wisły Kraków im. Henryka Reymana; Attendance: 0 Referee: (Poland) Paweł Raczkowski
Note: COVID-19 pandemic in Poland

28 February 2021 19	Śląsk Wrocław	2–1	Pogoń Szczecin	Wrocław
17:30 CET	Praszelik (yellow card) 37'; Erik Expósito 44' 45+2'	Report	Bartkowski 11' (yellow card) 64'	Stadium: Municipal Stadium in Wrocław; Attendance: 0 Referee: (Poland) Szymon Marciniak
Note: COVID-19 pandemic in Poland

7 March 2021 20	Pogoń Szczecin	v	Lech Poznań	Szczecin
15:00 CET				Stadium: Stadion Florian Krygier

=== Polish Cup ===
2 September 2020 Round of 64	Podhale Nowy Targ	0–5	Pogoń Szczecin	Nowy Targ
16:00 CEST (UTC+02:00)		Łączy nas piłka 90minut	Smoliński 7'; Kucharczyk 17' (pen.); Gorgon 29'; Drygas 81' (pen.), 82'	Stadium: Stadion Miejski im. Józefa Piłsudskiego; Attendance: 0 Referee: Daniel Kruczyński (Żywiec)
Note: Match originally scheduled on 16 August 2020, 16:00 CEST (UTC+02:00) was postponed due to COVID-19 disease detection in Pogoń Szczecin team.

20 November 2020 Round of 32	Wisła Płock	1–1 (a.e.t.) (3–4 p)	Pogoń Szczecin	Płock
12:30 CET (UTC+01:00)	Lewandowski 18'	Łączy nas piłka 90minut	Drygas 33' (pen.)	Stadium: Stadion im. Kazimierza Górskiego; Attendance: 0 Referee: Wojciech Myć (Lublin)
	Penalties
	Szwoch (penalty scored); Lesniak (penalty scored); Pyrdoł (penalty missed); Tomasik (penalty scored); Cabrera (penalty missed); Obradović (penalty missed)		(penalty missed) Kucharczyk; (penalty scored) Kowalczyk; (penalty scored) Gorgon; (penalty missed) Matynia; (penalty scored) Hostikka; (penalty scored) Zech
Note: Match originally scheduled on 3 November 2020, 17:00 CET (UTC+01:00) was postponed due to COVID-19 disease detection in Wisła Płock team.

10 February 2021 Round of 16	Pogoń Szczecin	1–2	Piast Gliwice	Szczecin
17:30 CET	Malec (yellow card) 56'; Zahović 90+1'	Summary	Chrapek 14' (pen.); Holúbek (yellow card) 32'; Jodłowiec (yellow card) 56'; Mateusz Winciersz 68'	Stadium: Stadion Miejski im. Floriana Krygiera; Attendance: 0 Referee: (Poland) Tomasz Kwiatkowski
Note: Played Behind Closed Doors
