= 2022–23 Pogoń Szczecin season =

Pogoń Szczecin
2022–23 season
- Chairman: Jarosław Mroczek
- Manager: Jens Gustafsson
- Stadium: Stadion Miejski im. Floriana Krygiera
- Ekstraklasa: 4th
- Polish Cup: Round of 16
- Top goalscorer: League: Kamil Grosicki (10); All: Kamil Grosicki (10)
- Biggest win: Pogoń Szczecin 3–0 Zagłębie Lubin
- Biggest defeat: Pogoń Szczecin 1–4 Górnik Zabrze
Home colours	Away colours	Third colours

The 2022–23 season is Pogoń Szczecin's 75th season in existence and the club's first season back in the top flight of Polish football. In addition to the domestic league, Pogoń Szczecin will participate in this season's edition of the Polish Cup. The season covers the period from 1 July 2022 to 30 June 2023.

== Players ==
=== First-team squad ===
As of 19 March 2023

Note: Flags indicate national team as defined under FIFA eligibility rules; some limited exceptions apply. Players may hold more than one non-FIFA nationality.

No.	Pos.	Nation	Player
1	GK	CRO	Dante Stipica
4	DF	BRA	Léo Borges
7	MF	POL	Rafał Kurzawa
8	MF	POL	Damian Dąbrowski
9	FW	SWE	Pontus Almqvist (on loan from Rostov)
10	FW	SLO	Luka Zahović
11	MF	POL	Kamil Grosicki
13	DF	GRE	Konstantinos Triantafyllopoulos
15	MF	POL	Marcel Wędrychowski
18	MF	POL	Michał Kucharczyk
20	MF	AUT	Alexander Gorgon
22	MF	ARM	Vahan Bichakhchyan
23	DF	AUT	Benedikt Zech
27	MF	POL	Sebastian Kowalczyk
28	DF	SWE	Linus Wahlqvist

No.	Pos.	Nation	Player
32	DF	GRE	Leonardo Koutris
33	DF	POL	Mariusz Malec
41	DF	POL	Paweł Stolarski
61	MF	POL	Kacper Smoliński
68	DF	CRO	Danijel Lončar
70	MF	POL	Stanisław Wawrzynowicz
72	MF	IRI	Yadegar Rostami
73	MF	POL	Adrian Przyborek
74	DF	POL	Dawid Rezaeian
76	GK	POL	Maciej Kowal
81	GK	POL	Bartosz Klebaniuk
99	MF	POL	Mateusz Łęgowski
—	MF	POL	Kacper Łukasiak

=== Out on loan ===
Note: Flags indicate national team as defined under FIFA eligibility rules; some limited exceptions apply. Players may hold more than one non-FIFA nationality.

No.	Pos.	Nation	Player
—	DF	POL	Jakub Lis (at Motor Lublin)
—	DF	POL	Bartłomiej Mruk (at Garbarnia Kraków)
—	DF	POL	Hubert Sadowski (at Skra Częstochowa)
—	DF	POL	Kryspin Szcześniak (at Górnik Zabrze)

No.	Pos.	Nation	Player
—	MF	POL	Mariusz Fornalczyk (at Termalica Nieciecza)
—	FW	POL	Kacper Kostorz (at Korona Kielce)
—	FW	POL	Aron Stasiak (at Olimpia Elbląg)

== Pre-season and friendlies ==
Win Draw Loss Fixtures

== Competitions ==
=== Overview ===
Competition	First match	Last match	Starting round	Final position	Record							
Competition	First match	Last match	Starting round	Final position	Pld	W	D	L	GF	GA	GD	Win %
Ekstraklasa	17 July 2022	27 May 2023	Matchday 1		27	12	8	7	42	39	+3	44.44
Polish Cup	18 October 2022	9 November 2022	Round of 32	First round	2	0	1	1	3	4	−1	0.00
Total					29	12	9	8	45	43	+2	41.38

Last updated: 1 April 2023
Source: Soccerway

=== Ekstraklasa ===
==== League table ====
Pos	Team	Pld	W	D	L	GF	GA	GD	Pts	Qualification or relegation
2	Legia Warsaw	34	19	9	6	57	37	+20	66	Qualification for the Europa Conference League second qualifying round (Note: Since the winner of the 2022–23 Polish Cup qualified for the Europa Conference League based on league position, the third Europa Conference League second qualifying round berth was transferred to the 4th-placed team.)
3	Lech Poznań	34	17	10	7	51	29	+22	61	Qualification for the Europa Conference League second qualifying round
4	Pogoń Szczecin	34	17	9	8	57	46	+11	60	Qualification for the Europa Conference League second qualifying round
5	Piast Gliwice	34	15	8	11	40	31	+9	53	
6	Górnik Zabrze	34	13	9	12	45	43	+2	48	

Source: ekstraklasa.org
Rules for classification: 1) Points; 2) Head-to-head points; 3) Head-to-head goal difference; 4) Goal difference; 5) Goals scored; 6) Number of wins; 7) Number of away wins; 8) Lower number of points based on yellow and red cards (red card = 3 points, yellow card = 1 point, sending-off = 3 points - including 1 point for first yellow card); 9) Fairplay ranking; 10) Draw. (Note: Head-to-head record is used only after all the matches between the teams in question have been played)

==== Results summary ====
Overall								Home						Away					
Pld	W	D	L	GF	GA	GD	Pts	W	D	L	GF	GA	GD	W	D	L	GF	GA	GD
31	15	9	7	49	42	+7	54	8	4	3	26	21	+5	7	5	4	23	21	+2

Last updated: 7 May 2023.
Source: PKO Ekstraklasa

==== Results by round ====
Round	1	2	3	4	5	6	7	8	9	10	11	12	13	14	15	16	17	18	19	20	21	22	23	24	25	26	27	28
Ground	H	A	H	A	H	A	H	A	H	A	H	A	H	A	A	H	A	A	H	A	H	A	H	A	H	A	H	A
Result	W	L	W	W	D	L	W	W	D	D	W	L	D	D	W	L	W	D	L	L	W	W	L	W	D	D	W	
Position																												

Updated to match(es) played on 8 April 2023. Source: PKO Ekstraklasa
A = Away; H = Home; W = Win; D = Draw; L = Loss

==== Matches ====
The league fixtures were announced on 1 June 2022.

17 July 2022 1	Pogoń Szczecin	2–1	Widzew Łódź	Szczecin
17:30 CEST	Zahović 45'; Malec (yellow card) 57'; Bichakhchyan 71'	Report	Pawłowski 19'; Kun (yellow card) 30'; Żyro (yellow card) 79'	Stadium: Stadion Miejski im. Floriana Krygiera; Attendance: 9,339; Referee: (Poland) Damian Sylwestrzak

24 July 2022 2	Śląsk Wrocław	2–1	Pogoń Szczecin	Wrocław
17:30 CEST	Jastrzembski 4'; Grétarsson 55'	Report	Bichakhchyan 30' (yellow card) 51'; Zech (yellow card) 53'; Kucharczyk (yellow card) 73'; Drygas (yellow card) 90+4'	Stadium: Tarczyński Arena Wrocław; Attendance: 10,879; Referee: (Poland) Tomasz Musial

31 July 2022 3	Pogoń Szczecin	1–0	Jagiellonia Białystok	Szczecin
15:00 CEST	Almqvist 8'; Kowalczyk (yellow card) 78'; Fornalczyk (yellow card) 90+4'; Stipica (yellow card) 90+6'	Report	Nené (yellow card) 75'; Marc Gual (yellow card) 90+6'	Stadium: Stadion Miejski im. Floriana Krygiera; Attendance: 8,981; Referee: (Poland) Piotr Lasyk

7 August 2022 4	Warta Poznań	1–2	Pogoń Szczecin	Grodzisk Wielkopolski
15:00 CEST	Zreľák 47' (yellow card) 90+3'; Stavropoulos (yellow card) 71'; Grobelny (yellow card) 90'	Report	Grosicki 22'; Ivanov 24' (o.g.); Triantafyllopoulos (yellow card) 29'; Łęgowski (yellow card) 34'; Bichakhchyan (yellow card) 88'	Stadium: Stadion Dyskobolii Grodzisk Wielkopolski; Attendance: 2,011; Referee: (Poland) Damian Sylwestrzak

13 August 2022 5	Pogoń Szczecin	2–2	Wisła Płock	Szczecin
20:00 CEST	Łęgowski 21' (yellow card) 55'; Stipica (yellow card) 47'; Zahović 75'	Report	Wolski 48' (pen.); Kryvotsyuk 88'; Bartłomiej Gradecki (yellow card) 90'	Stadium: Stadion Miejski im. Floriana Krygiera; Attendance: 9,124; Referee: (Poland) Daniel Stefański

27 August 2022 7	Pogoń Szczecin	3–0	Zagłębie Lubin	Szczecin
17:30 CEST	Dąbrowski 26'; Grosicki 62'; Almqvist 64'	Report	Hinokio (yellow card) 80'; Makowski (yellow card) 87'	Stadium: Stadion Miejski im. Floriana Krygiera; Attendance: 9,222; Referee: (Poland) Paweł Malec

31 August 2022 6	Raków Częstochowa	1–0	Pogoń Szczecin	Częstochowa
18:00 CEST	Kun (yellow card) 17'; Racovițan (yellow card) 32'; Wdowiak 55'; Ivi (yellow card) 81'; Piasecki (yellow card) 88'; Papanikolaou (yellow card) 90+3'	Report	Dąbrowski (yellow card) 35'; Zahović (yellow card) 45'; Fornalczyk (yellow card) 86'; Léo Borges (yellow card) 88'; Bichakhchyan (yellow card) 90'	Stadium: Miejski Stadion Piłkarski "Raków"; Attendance: 5,012; Referee: (Poland) Paweł Raczkowski

=== Polish Cup ===
18 October 2022 Round of 32	Rekord Bielsko-Biała	3–3 (a.e.t.) (11–12 p)	Pogoń Szczecin

9 November 2022 Round of 16	Pogoń Szczecin	0–1	Raków Częstochowa	Szczecin
				Stadium: Stadion Miejski im. Floriana Krygiera
