= Kacper Rosa =

Polish association football player

Personal information
- Full name: Kacper Rosa
- Date of birth: 13 August 1994 (age 32)
- Place of birth: Kostrzyn nad Odrą, Poland
- Height: 1.91 m (6 ft 3 in)
- Position: Goalkeeper

Youth career
- Celuloza Kostrzyn nad Odrą
- –2010: UKP Zielona Góra
- 2010–2011: GKP Gorzów Wielkopolski
- 2011: Falubaz Zielona Góra

Senior career*
Years	Team	Apps	(Gls)
2012–2015	Lechia Gdańsk	0	(0)
2012–2015	Lechia Gdańsk II	27	(0)
2015–2016	Jagiellonia Białystok II	17	(0)
2016	Stilon Gorzów	12	(0)
2016–2017	Świt Szczecin	16	(0)
2017–2019	ROW Rybnik	57	(0)
2019–2021	Odra Opole	29	(0)
2021–2022	Wisła Kraków	0	(0)
2022–2023	Stilon Gorzów	10	(0)
2023–2025	Motor Lublin	37	(0)
2025	Kapaz	8	(0)
- * Club domestic league appearances and goals as of 18:19, 30 December 2025 (UTC)

Kacper Rosa (born 13 August 1994) is a Polish professional footballer who plays as a goalkeeper.

== Senior career ==
Rosa started his youth career with the club in his hometown of Kostrzyn nad Odrą. He then had youth spells with other teams close by, with UKP Zielona Góra and Falubaz Zielona Góra based in Zielona Góra, and GKP Gorzów Wielkopolski based in Gorzów Wielkopolski. Rosa's big break came in 2012, when he joined the Ekstraklasa team Lechia Gdańsk. He joined Lechia's second team, playing a total of 27 league games during his time with the club. A year after joining Lechia, Rosa signed a new deal keeping him with the club until 2017. However, he didn't complete the contract and joined league rivals Jagiellonia Białystok in 2015, before having his contract terminated in January 2016. After Jagiellonia, Rosa had short spells with Stilon Gorzów Wielkopolski and Świt Szczecin before joining ROW Rybnik in 2017.

== Honours ==
Stilon Gorzów Wielkopolski

- Polish Cup (Lubusz regionals): 2015–16
