= Kacper Kozłowski =

Kacper Kozłowski may refer to:

- Kacper Kozłowski (sprinter) (born 1986), Polish sprint athlete
- Kacper Kozłowski (footballer) (born 2003), Polish footballer
