= Kiełb =

Kiełb or Kielb is a Polish surname meaning "gudgeon" (fish). Notable people with the surname include:

- Jacek Kiełb (born 1988), Polish footballer
- Jakub Kiełb (born 1993), Polish footballer
