= Matynia =

Matynia is a Polish surname. Notable people with the surname include:

- Hubert Matynia (born 1995), Polish footballer
