= Mateusz Łęgowski =

Polish footballer (born 2003)

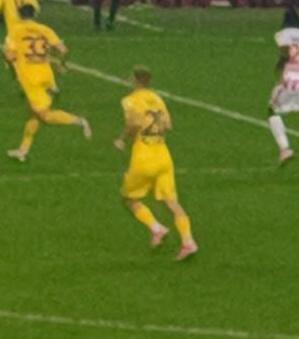
- Łęgowski with Eyüpspor in 2025

Personal information
- Full name: Mateusz Jacek Łęgowski
- Date of birth: 29 January 2003 (age 23)
- Place of birth: Brodnica, Poland
- Height: 1.81 m (5 ft 11 in)
- Position: Defensive midfielder

Team information
- Current team: Motor Lublin
- Number: 6

Youth career
- 2013–2016: Gol Brodnica
- 2018–2019: Pogoń Szczecin
- 2019–2020: → Valencia (loan)

Senior career*
Years	Team	Apps	(Gls)
2019–2021	Pogoń Szczecin II	24	(0)
2021–2023	Pogoń Szczecin	47	(4)
2023–2025	Salernitana	30	(0)
2024–2025	→ Yverdon-Sport (loan)	29	(1)
2025–2026	Eyüpspor	26	(2)
2026–	Motor Lublin	11	(1)

International career
2018	Poland U15	6	(0)
2018–2019	Poland U16	10	(0)
2019–2020	Poland U17	10	(0)
2021	Poland U19	2	(0)
2021–2025	Poland U21	22	(0)
2022	Poland	1	(0)
- * Club domestic league appearances and goals as of 21:09, 25 October 2026 (UTC)

Mateusz Jacek Łęgowski (born 29 January 2003) is a Polish professional footballer who plays as a defensive midfielder for Ekstraklasa club Motor Lublin.

== Club career ==
On 4 March 2022, Łęgowski scored his first goal for Pogoń Szczecin in the 76th minute of a 4–0 league win over Radomiak Radom.

On 17 August 2023, Łęgowski signed for Serie A club Salernitana on a contract until 2026. He made his debut on 21 August in an away match against AS Roma, which ended in a 2–2 draw.

On 9 September 2024, he joined Swiss Super League side Yverdon-Sport on loan for the remainder of the season.

After returning to Salernitana, he made one Serie C appearance before terminating his contract by mutual consent on 1 September 2025.

On 9 September 2025, Łęgowski joined Turkish club Eyüpspor on a three-year contract. He unilaterally terminated his contract in May 2026 due to non-payments.

On 4 July 2026, Łęgowski joined Ekstraklasa club Motor Lublin on a deal until June 2028, with an option for another year.

== International career ==
In September 2022, Łęgowski was called up to the Polish senior squad for upcoming 2022–23 UEFA Nations League A matches against the Netherlands and Wales. He debuted in the match against the former on 22 September.

== Personal life ==
Łęgowski has a twin brother named Łukasz who is three minutes younger than him.

== Career statistics ==
=== Club ===
As of match played 17 May 2026

Appearances and goals by club, season and competition
Club	Season	League			National cup (Note: Includes Coppa Italia, Swiss Cup, Turkish Cup)		Europe		Other		Total	
Club	Season	Division	Apps	Goals	Apps	Goals	Apps	Goals	Apps	Goals	Apps	Goals
Pogoń Szczecin II	2018–19	III liga, gr. II	1	0	—		—		—		1	0
Pogoń Szczecin II	2020–21	III liga, gr. II	17	0	—		—		—		17	0
Pogoń Szczecin II	2021–22	III liga, gr. II	6	0	—		—		—		6	0
Pogoń Szczecin II	Total		24	0	—		—		—		24	0
Pogoń Szczecin	2021–22	Ekstraklasa	19	1	0	0	—		—		19	1
Pogoń Szczecin	2022–23	Ekstraklasa	26	3	0	0	1 (Note: Appearances in UEFA Europa Conference League)	0	—		27	3
Pogoń Szczecin	2023–24	Ekstraklasa	2	0	0	0	3	0	—		5	0
Pogoń Szczecin	Total		47	4	0	0	4	0	—		51	4
Salernitana	2023–24	Serie A	29	0	2	0	—		—		31	0
Salernitana	2024–25	Serie B	0	0	1	0	—		—		1	0
Salernitana	2025–26	Serie C	1	0	—		—		0	0	1	0
Salernitana	Total		30	0	3	0	—		—		33	0
Yverdon-Sport (loan)	2024–25	Swiss Super League	29	1	1	0	—		—		30	1
Eyüpspor	2025–26	Süper Lig	26	2	2	1	—		—		28	3
Motor Lublin	2026–27	Ekstraklasa	0	0	0	0	—		—		0	0
Career total			156	7	6	1	4	0	0	0	166	8

=== International ===
As of match played 22 September 2022

Appearances and goals by national team and year
National team	Year	Apps	Goals
Poland	2022	1	0
Total		1	0
