= Artur Bogusz =

Polish footballer

Personal information
- Date of birth: 18 April 1993 (age 33)
- Place of birth: Łódź, Poland
- Height: 1.81 m (5 ft 11 in)
- Position: Full-back

Team information
- Current team: Football Campus Tomaszów Maz. (player-manager)
- Number: 7

Youth career
- Widzew Łódź
- –2010: UKS SMS Łódź

Senior career*
Years	Team	Apps	(Gls)
2010–2012	UKS SMS Łódź		
2012–2014	Tur Turek	26	(1)
2013	→ ŁKS Łódź (loan)	2	(0)
2013–2018	Wigry Suwałki	124	(5)
2016	→ Olimpia Zambrów (loan)	15	(2)
2018–2020	ŁKS Łódź	31	(3)
2020–2022	Radomiak Radom	31	(1)
2022–2024	Chrobry Głogów	48	(1)
2024–2025	Lechia Tomaszów Mazowiecki	18	(3)
2025	Relax Czerniewice	5	(11)
2025–	Football Campus Tomaszów Maz.	21	(30)

Managerial career
- 2025–: Football Campus Tomaszów Maz. (player-manager)
- * Club domestic league appearances and goals as of 09:38, 27 July 2026 (UTC)

Artur Bogusz (born 18 April 1993) is a Polish professional footballer who plays as a full-back. He currently serves as the player-manager for Klasa A club Football Campus Tomaszów Mazowiecki.

== Managerial statistics ==
As of match played 21 June 2026

Managerial record by team and tenure
Team	From	To	Record							
Team	From	To	G	W	D	L	GF	GA	GD	Win %
Football Campus Tomaszów Maz. (player-manager)	5 July 2025	Present	24	20	3	1	171	26	+145	83.33
Total			24	20	3	1	171	26	+145	83.33

== Honours ==
Wigry Suwałki

- II liga East: 2013–14

Radomiak Radom

- I liga: 2020–21

=== Player-manager ===
Football Campus Tomaszów Mazowiecki

- Klasa B Łódź IV: 2025–26
