= Przemysław Bargiel =

Polish footballer

Personal information
- Full name: Przemysław Gabriel Bargiel
- Date of birth: 26 March 2000 (age 26)
- Place of birth: Ruda Śląska, Poland
- Height: 1.79 m (5 ft 10 1/2 in)
- Position: Attacking midfielder

Team information
- Current team: Lechia Zielona Góra
- Number: 7

Youth career
- Ruch Chorzów
- 2017–2019: AC Milan
- 2018–2019: → Spezia (loan)

Senior career*
Years	Team	Apps	(Gls)
2016–2017	Ruch Chorzów	5	(0)
2019–2023	Śląsk Wrocław II	88	(18)
2019–2023	Śląsk Wrocław	3	(0)
2023–2025	Wieczysta Kraków	14	(1)
2023–2025	Wieczysta Kraków II	41	(14)
2025–	Lechia Zielona Góra	33	(13)

International career
2014–2015	Poland U15	8	(2)
2015–2016	Poland U16	9	(1)
2016	Poland U17	2	(0)
2017–2018	Poland U18	7	(1)
2018–2019	Poland U19	4	(1)
- * Club domestic league appearances and goals as of 22:53, 31 May 2026 (UTC)

Przemysław Gabriel Bargiel (born 26 March 2000) is a Polish professional footballer who plays as a midfielder for II liga club Lechia Zielona Góra.

== Club career ==
=== Ruch Chorzów ===
Bargiel started his football career in the youth teams of Ruch Chorzów. On 29 April 2016, aged 16, he made his professional debut for the club in an Ekstraklasa game against Cracovia, which Ruch lost 1–0. He went on to make a total of 5 appearances over the remainder of that season and the following one.

=== AC Milan ===
On 10 August 2017, he moved to Italian Serie A side AC Milan, for a reported fee of €350k, plus a further €150k of possible bonus payment.

=== Spezia ===
On 19 August 2018, Bargiel was sent out to Serie B club Spezia on a season-long loan.

=== Śląsk Wrocław ===
On 2 September 2019, Bargiel transferred back to Poland, signing a four-year deal with Śląsk Wrocław.

=== Wieczysta Kraków ===
On 23 June 2023, Bargiel signed a two-year contract with an extension option with III liga side Wieczysta Kraków. On 20 February 2025, he was permanently moved to Wieczysta's reserve team. In June 2025, he left the club at the end of his contract.

=== Lechia Zielona Góra ===
On 8 July 2025, Bargiel joined fourth tier side Lechia Zielona Góra.

== Honours ==
Śląsk Wrocław II

- III liga, group III: 2019–20

Wieczysta Kraków

- III liga, group IV: 2023–24

Wieczysta Kraków II

- V liga Lesser Poland West: 2023–24

Lechia Zielona Góra

- III liga, group III: 2025–26
- Polish Cup (Lubusz regionals): 2025–26
