= Kenan Kodro =

Bosnian footballer (born 1993)

Personal information
- Date of birth: 19 August 1993 (age 33)
- Place of birth: San Sebastián, Spain
- Height: 1.88 m (6 ft 2 in)
- Position: Forward

Team information
- Current team: OFI (on loan from Ferencváros)
- Number: 19

Youth career
- 2004–2008: Antiguoko
- 2008–2011: Real Sociedad

Senior career*
Years	Team	Apps	(Gls)
2011–2014	Real Sociedad B	76	(16)
2012	→ Lagun Onak (loan)	9	(2)
2014–2017	Osasuna	80	(12)
2017–2018	Mainz 05	8	(0)
2018	→ Grasshoppers (loan)	14	(7)
2018–2019	Copenhagen	8	(1)
2019–2021	Athletic Bilbao	26	(3)
2021	→ Valladolid (loan)	14	(0)
2021–2024	Fehérvár	77	(39)
2024–	Ferencváros	15	(2)
2024–2025	→ Gaziantep (loan)	27	(2)
2025–2026	→ Zaragoza (loan)	33	(7)
2026–	→ OFI (loan)	9	(4)

International career
2017–2023	Bosnia and Herzegovina	15	(2)
- * Club domestic league appearances and goals as of 8 November 2026

Kenan Kodro (pronounced [kěnan kôːdro]; born 19 August 1993) is a professional footballer who plays as a forward for Super League Greece club OFI, on loan from Ferencváros. Born in Spain, he played for the Bosnia and Herzegovina national team.

Kodro started his professional career at Real Sociedad B, who loaned him to Lagun Onak in 2012. Two years later, he joined Osasuna. In 2017, he signed with Mainz 05, who sent him on loan to Grasshoppers in 2018. Later that year, he was transferred to Copenhagen. The following year, Kodro moved to Athletic Bilbao, who loaned him to Valladolid in 2021. Later that year, he joined Fehérvár. In 2024, he switched to Ferencváros, who sent him on loan to Gaziantep later that year, to Zaragoza in 2025 and to OFI in 2026.

Kodro made his senior international debut for Bosnia and Herzegovina in 2017, earning 15 caps until 2023.

== Club career ==
=== Early career ===
Kodro started playing football at a local club Antiguoko, before joining the youth academy of his hometown team Real Sociedad in 2008. He made his professional debut and scored his first professional goal playing for Real Sociedad's reserve squad in 2011 at the age of 18. In February 2012, he was sent on a six-month loan to Lagun Onak.

=== Osasuna ===
In July 2014, Kodro switched to Osasuna. He made his official debut for the side on 23 August against Barcelona B. On 18 October, he scored his first goal for Osasuna against Tenerife, which secured the victory for his team.

In February 2015, he extended his contract with the squad until June 2018.

He was instrumental in Osasuna's promotion to the La Liga, which was sealed on 18 June 2016.

=== Mainz 05 ===
In June 2017, Kodro moved to German outfit Mainz 05 on a four-year deal. He made his competitive debut for the club in a DFB-Pokal tie against Lüneburger Hansa on 12 August. A week later, he made his league debut against Hannover 96.

In February 2018, Kodro was loaned to Swiss team Grasshoppers until the end of the season. He scored his first career hat-trick in a triumph over Lugano on 21 April.

=== Copenhagen ===
In July, Kodro was transferred to Danish side Copenhagen for an undisclosed fee. He debuted officially for the squad in a UEFA Europa League qualifier against KuPS on 12 July. A week later, he made his league debut against Horsens. On 26 July, he scored his first goal for Copenhagen in a UEFA Europa League qualifier against Stjarnan. Kodro scored his first hat-trick for the club on 2 August against the same opponent. On 7 October, he scored his first league goal in a defeat of Randers.

=== Athletic Bilbao ===
In January 2019, Kodro joined Athletic Bilbao on a contract until June 2022. He debuted competitively for the team on 10 February against Barcelona. On 16 March, he scored his first goal for Athletic Bilbao in a victory over Atlético Madrid. He won his first trophy with the club on 17 January 2021, by beating Barcelona in the Supercopa de España final.

In January, he was loaned to Valladolid for the remainder of the campaign.

=== Fehérvár ===
In August, Kodro signed a three-year deal with Hungarian outfit Fehérvár. He played his first official game for the side on 28 August against MTK Budapest and managed to score a brace, ensuring the triumph for his squad.

=== Ferencváros ===
In January 2024, Kodro moved to Ferencváros on a contract until June 2026. He played his first competitive match for the team against Kisvárda on 3 February. On 14 April, he scored his first goal for Ferencváros in a win over Zalaegerszeg. He won his first title with the club on 20 April, when they were crowned league champions.

In July, Kodro was loaned to Turkish side Gaziantep for the rest of the season.

In September 2025, he was sent on a season-long loan to Zaragoza.

In August 2026, he was loaned to Greek squad OFI until the end of the season.

== International career ==
In March 2017, Kodro received his first senior call up to Bosnia and Herzegovina, for a 2018 FIFA World Cup qualifier against Gibraltar and a friendly game against Albania. He debuted against the latter on 28 March.

On 3 September, in a 2018 FIFA World Cup qualifier against Gibraltar, Kodro scored his first senior international goal.

He retired from international football on 25 September 2023.

== Personal life ==
Kodro's father Meho was also a professional footballer. They became the first father and son to represent Bosnia and Herzegovina internationally.

== Career statistics ==
=== Club ===
As of match played 8 November 2026

Appearances and goals by club, season and competition
Club	Season	League			National cup (Note: Includes Copa del Rey, DFB-Pokal, Swiss Cup, Danish Cup, Magyar Kupa, Turkish Cup, Greek Cup)		Continental		Other		Total	
Club	Season	Division	Apps	Goals	Apps	Goals	Apps	Goals	Apps	Goals	Apps	Goals
Real Sociedad B	2011–12	Segunda División B	14	2	–		–		–		14	2
Real Sociedad B	2012–13	Segunda División B	35	6	–		–		–		35	6
Real Sociedad B	2013–14	Segunda División B	27	8	–		–		–		27	8
Real Sociedad B	Total		76	16	–		–		–		76	16
Lagun Onak (loan)	2011–12	Tercera División	9	2	–		–		–		9	2
Osasuna	2014–15	Segunda División	32	2	1	0	–		–		33	2
Osasuna	2015–16	Segunda División	20	3	1	0	–		4 (Note: Appearances in La Liga play-offs)	3	25	6
Osasuna	2016–17	La Liga	28	7	2	0	–		–		30	7
Osasuna	Total		80	12	4	0	–		4	3	88	15
Mainz 05	2017–18	Bundesliga	8	0	2	0	–		–		10	0
Grasshoppers (loan)	2017–18	Swiss Super League	14	7	1	0	–		–		15	7
Copenhagen	2018–19	Danish Superliga	8	1	2	0	8 (Note: Appearances in UEFA Europa League)	5	–		18	6
Athletic Bilbao	2018–19	La Liga	11	1	–		–		–		11	1
Athletic Bilbao	2019–20	La Liga	12	1	1	1	–		–		13	2
Athletic Bilbao	2020–21	La Liga	3	1	0	0	–		–		3	1
Athletic Bilbao	Total		26	3	1	1	–		–		27	4
Valladolid (loan)	2020–21	La Liga	14	0	–		–		–		14	0
Fehérvár	2021–22	Nemzeti Bajnokság I	27	15	3	1	–		–		30	16
Fehérvár	2022–23	Nemzeti Bajnokság I	33	13	2	1	5 (Note: Appearance(s) in UEFA Conference League)	3	–		40	17
Fehérvár	2023–24	Nemzeti Bajnokság I	17	11	1	0	–		–		18	11
Fehérvár	Total		77	39	6	2	5	3	–		88	44
Ferencváros	2023–24	Nemzeti Bajnokság I	14	2	4	0	1	0	–		19	2
Ferencváros	2026–27	Nemzeti Bajnokság I	1	0	0	0	2	0	–		3	0
Ferencváros	Total		15	2	4	0	3	0	–		22	2
Gaziantep (loan)	2024–25	Süper Lig	27	2	5	6	–		–		32	8
Zaragoza (loan)	2025–26	Segunda División	33	7	1	1	–		–		34	8
OFI (loan)	2026–27	Super League Greece	9	4	3	0	4	0	–		16	4
Career total			396	95	29	10	18	8	4	3	447	116

=== International ===
Appearances and goals by national team and year
National team	Year	Apps	Goals
Bosnia and Herzegovina
Bosnia and Herzegovina	2017	4	1
Bosnia and Herzegovina	2018	5	1
Bosnia and Herzegovina	2019	0	0
Bosnia and Herzegovina	2020	0	0
Bosnia and Herzegovina	2021	1	0
Bosnia and Herzegovina	2022	1	0
Bosnia and Herzegovina	2023	4	0
Total		15	2

Scores and results list Bosnia and Herzegovina's goal tally first, score column indicates score after each Kodro goal.

List of international goals scored by Kenan Kodro
No.	Date	Venue	Cap	Opponent	Score	Result	Competition
1	3 September 2017	Estádio Algarve, Faro/Loulé, Portugal	3	Gibraltar	2–0	4–0	2018 FIFA World Cup qualification
2	23 March 2018	Ludogorets Arena, Razgrad, Bulgaria	5	Bulgaria	1–0	1–0	Friendly

== Honours ==
Athletic Bilbao

- Supercopa de España: 2021

Ferencváros

- Nemzeti Bajnokság I: 2023–24
