= Maciej Mas =

Polish footballer (born 2001)

Personal information
- Full name: Maciej Daniel Mas
- Date of birth: 15 May 2001 (age 25)
- Place of birth: Łódź, Poland
- Height: 1.96 m (6 ft 5 in)
- Position: Striker

Team information
- Current team: Zawisza Bydgoszcz
- Number: 90

Youth career
- 2010–2012: Sokół Aleksandrów Łódzki
- 2012–2018: UKS SMS Łódź

Senior career*
Years	Team	Apps	(Gls)
2018–2020	UKS SMS Łódź	11	(18)
2019	→ GKS Bełchatów (loan)	17	(0)
2020	→ Cagliari Primavera (loan)	6	(4)
2020–2022	Jagiellonia Białystok	0	(0)
2020	Jagiellonia Białystok II	2	(2)
2020–2021	→ GKS Bełchatów (loan)	24	(3)
2021–2022	→ Skra Częstochowa (loan)	34	(4)
2022–2024	Sandecja Nowy Sącz	34	(4)
2024	Skra Częstochowa	15	(5)
2024–2026	Olimpia Grudziądz	68	(18)
2026–	Zawisza Bydgoszcz	0	(0)

International career
2021	Poland U20	3	(0)
- * Club domestic league appearances and goals as of 16:04, 2 June 2026 (UTC)

Maciej Daniel Mas (born 15 May 2001) is a Polish professional footballer who plays as a striker for II liga club Zawisza Bydgoszcz.

== Career ==
Mas started his career with Polish sixth division side UKS SMS Łódź.

In 2019, he was sent on loan to GKS Bełchatów in the Polish second division.

For the second half of the 2019–20 season, he was sent on loan to Italian Serie A club Cagliari Calcio.

In 2020, Mas returned to GKS Bełchatów.

On 1 August 2022, shortly after terminating his contract with Jagiellonia Białystok, he joined I Liga side Sandecja Nowy Sącz on a two-year contract. On 5 January 2024, he terminated his contract by mutual consent. Three days later, Mas returned to Skra Częstochowa on a six-month contract with an option for another year.

On 21 June 2024, following Sandecja's relegation to the fourth tier, Mas joined II liga club Olimpia Grudziądz.

On 30 June 2026, Mas moved to recently promoted II liga side Zawisza Bydgoszcz.
