= Patryk Wolański =

Polish footballer (born 1991)

Personal information
- Date of birth: 15 August 1991 (age 35)
- Place of birth: Tuchów, Poland
- Height: 1.88 m (6 ft 2 in)
- Position: Goalkeeper

Team information
- Current team: Orzeł Parzęczew
- Number: 25

Youth career
- Unia Tarnów

Senior career*
Years	Team	Apps	(Gls)
2008–2009	UKS SMS Łódź II		
2009–2010	UKS SMS Łódź		
2010–2011	Włókniarz Konstantynów Łódzki		
2011–2014	Widzew Łódź	16	(0)
2013	→ Sokół Aleksandrów Łódzki (loan)	0	(0)
2014–2016	Midtjylland	0	(0)
2014–2015	→ Vejle (loan)	12	(0)
2016	Horsens	1	(0)
2016–2020	Widzew Łódź	77	(0)
2020	Sokół Lutomiersk	3	(2)
2021–2022	KS Kutno	47	(0)
2022–2023	Pogoń Zduńska Wola	16	(0)
2023	Sokół Lutomiersk	5	(7)
2024–2025	Orkan Buczek	36	(1)
2025–2026	Zdrój Ciechocinek	11	(0)
2026–	Orzeł Parzęczew	12	(0)
- * Club domestic league appearances and goals as of 12:40, 30 June 2026 (UTC)

Patryk Wolanski (born 15 August 1991) is a Polish professional footballer who plays as a goalkeeper for IV liga Łódź club Orzeł Parzęczew. Besides Poland, he has played in Denmark.

== Career ==
Wolanski started his senior career with Widzew Łódź in the Polish Ekstraklasa, where he made sixteen appearances. After that, he played for Midtjylland, Vejle Boldklub, AC Horsens and in Widzew Łódź again. On 22 October 2020, he joined the amateur Polish klasa B side Sokół Lutomiersk for the autumn round of the 2020–21 season, where he played as a winger. He started the spring round as a player of KS Kutno in the III liga.

== Honours ==
Widzew Łódź

- III liga, group I: 2017–18

Orzeł Parzęczew

- Regional league Łódź: 2025–26
