= 2024–25 Gaziantep F.K. season =

Gaziantep F.K.
2024–25 season
- Manager: Selçuk İnan
- Stadium: Gaziantep Stadium
- Süper Lig: 12th
- Turkish Cup: Group stage
- Top goalscorer: League: Deian Sorescu (5); All: Deian Sorescu (5)
- Average home league attendance: 6,237
- Biggest win: Gaziantep 3–0 İstanbul Başakşehir
- Biggest defeat: Alanyaspor 3–0 Gaziantep
Home colours	Away colours	Third colours

The 2024–25 season was Gaziantep FK's 37th overall, featuring their sixth consecutive appearance in the Süper Lig, along with participation in the Turkish Cup.

== Transfers ==
=== In ===
Pos.	Player	Transferred from	Fee	Date	Source
FW	(Bosnia and Herzegovina) Kenan Kodro	(Hungary) Ferencváros	Loan	30 July 2024	
MF	(Turkey) Ogün Özçiçek	(Turkey) Yeni Malatyaspor	€300,000	8 August 2024	
DF	(Brazil) Bruno Viana	(Brazil) Coritiba	Loan	8 August 2024	
DF	(Turkey) Emre Taşdemir	(Turkey) Pendikspor	Free	10 August 2024	
MF	(Romania) Deian Sorescu	(Poland) Raków Częstochowa	Undisclosed	10 August 2024	
FW	(Switzerland) Christophe Lungoyi	(Italy) Juventus Next Gen	Undisclosed	2 September 2024	
MF	(Senegal) Badou Ndiaye		Free	4 September 2024	
FW	(Nigeria) David Okereke	(Italy) Cremonese	Loan	10 September 2024	
FW	(Turkey) Halil Dervişoğlu	(Turkey) Galatasaray	Loan	13 September 2024	

== Friendlies ==
14 July 2024 Friendly	Gaziantep (Turkey)	1–1	(Romania) 1599 Șelimbăr

24 July 2024 Friendly	Gaziantep (Turkey)	1–0	(Kosovo) Prishtina

27 July 2024 Friendly	Gaziantep (Turkey)	3–0	(Turkey) Bandırmaspor

30 July 2024 Friendly	Alanyaspor (Turkey)	1–0	(Turkey) Gaziantep

7 September 2024 Friendly	Gaziantep (Turkey)	5–1	(Turkey) Şanlıurfaspor	Gaziantep
16:30 UTC+3				Stadium: Gaziantep BBS Tesisleri

== Competitions ==
=== Overall record ===
Competition	First match	Last match	Starting round	Record							
Competition	First match	Last match	Starting round	Pld	W	D	L	GF	GA	GD	Win %
Süper Lig	12 August 2024	1 June 2025	Matchday 1	16	6	3	7	22	24	−2	37.50
Turkish Cup	5 December 2024			2	2	0	0	3	0	+3	100.00
Total				18	8	3	7	25	24	+1	44.44

Last updated: 22 December 2024
Source: Competitions

=== Süper Lig ===
==== League table ====
Pos	Team	Pld	W	D	L	GF	GA	GD	Pts
10	Kasımpaşa	36	11	14	11	62	63	−1	47
11	Konyaspor	36	13	7	16	45	50	−5	46
12	Gaziantep	36	12	9	15	45	50	−5	45
13	Alanyaspor	36	12	9	15	43	50	−7	45
14	Kayserispor	36	11	12	13	45	57	−12	45

Source: Süper Lig
Rules for classification: 1) Points; 2) Head-to-head points; 3) Head-to-head goal difference; 4) Head-to-head goals scored; 5) Goal difference; 6) Goals scored; 7) Play-off.
(Note: Head-to-head record is used only after all the matches between the teams in question have been played)

==== Results by round ====
Round	1	2	3	4	5	6	7	8	9	10	11	12	13	14	15	16	17
Ground	A	H	A		A	H	A	H	A	H	H	A	H	A	H	A	H
Result	W	L	L	B	L	D	L	D	D	W	W	L	W	L	W	L	W
Position	5	9	13	14	15	15	15	16	16	15	12	14	11	13	10	12	

Updated to match(es) played on 22 December 2024. Source: Süper Lig
A = Away; H = Home; W = Win; D = Draw; L = Loss

==== Matches ====
12 August 2024 1	Bodrum	0–1	Gaziantep	Bodrum
				Stadium: Bodrum İlçe Stadium

18 August 2024 2	Gaziantep	0–1	Samsunspor	Gaziantep
				Stadium: Gaziantep Stadium

4	Bye

14 September 2024 5	Sivasspor	3–2	Gaziantep	Sivas
				Stadium: New Sivas 4 Eylül Stadium

17 September 2024 3	Galatasaray	3–1	Gaziantep	Sarıyer
				Stadium: Rams Park

23 September 2024 6	Gaziantep	0–0	Trabzonspor	Gaziantep
				Stadium: Gaziantep Stadium

29 September 2024 7	Eyüpspor	3–2	Gaziantep	Kasımpaşa
				Stadium: Recep Tayyip Erdoğan Stadium

6 October 2024 8	Gaziantep	1–1	Beşiktaş	Gaziantep
				Stadium: Gaziantep Stadium

19 October 2024 9	Kayserispor	2–2	Gaziantep	Kayseri
				Stadium: Kadir Has Stadium

27 October 2024 10	Gaziantep	3–1	Konyaspor	Gaziantep
13:30 UTC+3				Stadium: Gaziantep Stadium

1 November 2024 11	Gaziantep	2–1	Göztepe	Gaziantep
20:00 UTC+3				Stadium: Gaziantep Stadium; Referee: Kadir Sağlam

9 November 2024 12	Hatayspor	3–1	Gaziantep	Mersin
16:00 UTC+3	Rui Pedro 12'; Bamgboye 35'; Strandberg 90+5'		Sorescu 45+2'	Stadium: Mersin Stadium

23 November 2024 13	Gaziantep	3–0	İstanbul Başakşehir	Gaziantep
16:00 UTC+3	Kozłowski 28'; Sorescu 45+3'; Okereke 75'			Stadium: Gaziantep Stadium

2 December 2024 14	Fenerbahçe	3–1	Gaziantep	Kadıköy
20:00 UTC+3	Aydın 3'; Becão 78'; Džeko 89'		Okereke 41'	Stadium: Şükrü Saracoğlu Stadium; Referee: Alper Akarsu

9 December 2024 15	Gaziantep	1–0	Çaykur Rizespor	Gaziantep
20:00 UTC+3	Grbić 4' (o.g.)			Stadium: Gaziantep Stadium; Referee: Direnç Tonusluoğlu

14 December 2024 16	Alanyaspor	3–0	Gaziantep	Alanya
19:00 UTC+3	Janvier (yellow card) 37'; Aliti (yellow card) 45+3', (goal) 54'; Hwang Ui-jo 88', 90'		Lungoyi (yellow card) 9'; Viana (yellow card) 52'; Daubin (yellow card) 71'	Stadium: Alanya Oba Stadium; Referee: Emre Kargın

22 December 2024 17	Gaziantep	2–0	Antalyaspor	Gaziantep
13:30 UTC+3	Kozłowski 42'; Sorescu (yellow card) 58'; Maxim 66'		Petrusenko (yellow card) 24'; Rakip (yellow card) 50' (yellow-red card) 86'; Dursun (yellow card) 90'	Stadium: Gaziantep Stadium; Referee: Oğuzhan Çakır

=== Turkish Cup ===
5 December 2024 Fifth round	Gaziantep	1–0	Batman Petrolspor	Gaziantep
20:30 UTC+3	Artan (yellow card) 52'; Taşdemir (yellow card) 58'; Kodro 90+2'	Report	Görmüş (yellow card) 90+4'	Stadium: Gaziantep Stadium; Referee: Sarper Barış Saka

18 December 2024 Fourth round	Gaziantep	2–0	52 Orduspor	Gaziantep
20:30 UTC+3	Özçiçek (yellow card) 54'; Kodro 61', 70'	Report	Arı (yellow card) 19'; Özcan (yellow card) 45'; Gülden (yellow card) 60' (yellow-red card) 86'	Stadium: Gaziantep Stadium; Referee: Davut Dakul Çelik

==== Group stage ====
Pos	Team	Pld	W	D	L	GF	GA	GD	Pts
1	Fenerbahçe	3	3	0	0	12	1	+11	9
2	Göztepe	3	3	0	0	7	0	+7	9
3	İstanbulspor	3	2	0	1	5	4	+1	6
4	Gaziantep	3	1	0	2	5	5	0	3
5	Erzurumspor	3	0	0	3	0	9	−9	0
6	Kasımpaşa	3	0	0	3	0	10	−10	0

7–9 January 2025 1	Gaziantep	v	İstanbulspor	Gaziantep
				Stadium: Gaziantep Stadium

4–6 February 2025 2	Göztepe	v	Gaziantep	İzmir
				Stadium: Gürsel Aksel Stadium

25–27 February 2025 3	Gaziantep	v	Fenerbahçe	Gaziantep
				Stadium: Gaziantep Stadium
