= UKS SMS Łódź =

Polish football club

- Full name: Uczniowski Klub Sportowy Szkoła Mistrzostwa Sportowego Łódź
- Founded: 1999; 27 years ago
- Ground: 12 Milionowa Street; 93-193 Łódź, Poland
- Chairman: Janusz Matusiak
- Manager: Marcin Pyrdoł (men's); Sebastian Papis (women's)
- League: Regional league Skierniewice (men's); Ekstraliga (women's)
- 2025–26: Regional league Skierniewice, 6th of 16 (men's); Ekstraliga, 5th of 12

Uczniowski Klub Sportowy Szkoła Mistrzostwa Sportowego Łódź (lit. 'Student Sports Club School of Sports Championships Łódź'), commonly known as UKS SMS Łódź, is a Polish football club based in Łódź, Łódź Voivodeship, currently playing in the regional league.

The club is well known for working with youngsters. UKS SMS Łódź operates at the Kazimierz Górski's High School of the Sports Championship School at the 12 Milionowa 12 Street in Łódź. The stadium has a capacity of 3,000 places (2,000 seats).

== UKS SMS grown-ups ==
- Błażej Augustyn
- Artur Bogusz
- Jakub Bursztyn
- Mateusz Cetnarski
- Mateusz Cholewiak
- Aboubacan Conde
- Tomasz Jodłowiec
- Jakub Kiełb
- Michał Kołba
- Jakub Kowalski
- Marcin Kowalczyk
- Artur Krysiak
- Przemysław Macierzyński
- Tomasz Makowski
- Maciej Makuszewski
- Piotr Marciniec
- Maciej Mas
- Andrzej Niewulis
- Krystian Nowak
- Oktawian Obuchowski
- Marcel Pięczek
- Przemysław Płacheta
- Robert Prochownik
- Mariusz Rybicki
- Jakub Romanowski
- Patryk Stępiński
- Karol Świderski
- Patryk Wolański
- Paweł Zawistowski
- Sebastian Zieleniecki
