= Lechia Zielona Góra =

Polish football club

- Full name: Klub Sportowy Lechia Zielona Góra
- Nicknames: Niebiesko-Żółci (The Blue and Yellows); Lechiści; Duma Zielonej Góry (The Pride of Zielona Góra)
- Founded: 1946; 80 years ago (as RKS Wagmo)
- Ground: Stadion MOSiR
- Capacity: 1,000
- Chairman: Maciej Murawski
- Manager: Sebastian Mordal
- League: II liga
- 2025–26: III liga, group III, 1st of 18 (promoted)
- Website: www.lechia-zg.pl
Home colours	Away colours

Lechia Zielona Góra is a Polish football club located in Zielona Góra. The team's colors are blue and yellow. They currently compete in the II liga, the third tier of Polish football, after earning promotion from the III liga in the 2025–26 season.

In 2012, the club merged with the local academy UKP Zielona Góra, dropping the historic Lechia name and temporarily competed under the sponsor's name Stelmet Zielona Góra but the club eventually folded in 2015. The club formed the basis of a new club Falubaz Zielona Góra; in 2019, Lechia was reactivated on its basis in turn.

== History ==
In 1946 one of the first football clubs in Zielona Góra was established at a car and bridge factory, named the Workers' Sports Club "Wagmo" (short for "Wagons and Bridges" - the name of the factory, which was the progenitor of "Zastal"). During the reorganization of the sport, the club joined the "Stal" association in 1951, although the clubs name was changed in 1949. In 1952, the team was invited to the games of the second tier as a representative of the Zielona Góra Province established two years earlier. "Stal" finished the season in last 10th place and was relegated after just one season. In 1955, the club changed its name to "Zastal". In February 1957, the club's name was changed to "KS Lechia". The "Zgrzeblarek" sports club was also included in the structure of the new club. Kucera became the president, and the board was supplemented by: Wietrzyński, Gałka, Smerda and Marciniak.

In July 2019, Lechia was reactivated on the basis of the Falubaz football club and joined group III of the III liga. On 30 May 2026, Lechia were crowned III liga's group III champions and earned promotion to the third tier after a 2–1 win over Górnik Polkowice.

== Players ==
=== Current squad ===
As of 15 September 2026

Note: Flags indicate national team as defined under FIFA eligibility rules; some limited exceptions apply. Players may hold more than one non-FIFA nationality.

No.	Pos.	Nation	Player
3	DF	POL	Rafał Ostrowski
4	DF	POL	Igor Kurowski
5	MF	POL	Franciszek Majchrzak
6	DF	GNB	Gibi Embaló
7	MF	POL	Przemysław Bargiel
8	MF	POL	Wiktor Nahrebecki
9	FW	POL	Kamil Olek
10	FW	POL	Przemysław Mycan
11	MF	POL	Kuba Kołodenny
12	GK	POL	Daniel Słobodzian
13	MF	POL	Kuba Lizakowski
15	MF	POL	Łukasz Maćkowiak
17	FW	POL	Dawid Dębski
18	MF	POL	Marcin Szpakowski
19	MF	POL	Marcel Kurek

No.	Pos.	Nation	Player
20	MF	POL	Szymon Osiński
21	MF	POL	Mateusz Zientarski
22	MF	POL	Michał Aleksandrowicz
23	MF	POL	Filip Szczotko
24	MF	POL	Michał Szmigiel
26	GK	POL	Jakub Bursztyn (captain)
27	MF	POL	Tymon Ziarkowski
28	DF	POL	Bartosz Rutkowski
33	DF	POL	Paweł Flis
75	MF	POL	Dominik Więcek
77	MF	POL	Mateusz Lisowski
—	DF	POL	Olaf Górniak
—	GK	POL	Kacper Kryś
—	MF	POL	Leo Lasota
—	DF	POL	Borys Sejwa

== Bibliography ==
- Andrzej Flügel (29 June 2019). "Historia zielonogórskiego futbolu zatoczyła koło. Był Falubaz i znów jest Lechia". Gazeta Lubuska.
- "Skarb - KSF Zielona Góra". www.90minut.pl.
- "Skarb - Lechia Zielona Góra". www.90minut.pl.
- "Skarb - Falubaz Zielona Góra". www.90minut.pl.
- "Skarb - Falubaz II Zielona Góra". www.90minut.pl.
- "Skarb - Falubaz Zielona Góra (junior)". www.90minut.pl.
- "Falubaz Zielona Góra (minor junior)". www.90minut.pl.
- "UKP Zielona Góra". www.90minut.pl.
- "UKP Zielona Góra (junior)". www.90minut.pl.
- "UKP Zielona Góra (minor junior)". www.90minut.pl.
