= Jakub Bursztyn =

Polish footballer

Personal information
- Date of birth: 25 March 1998 (age 28)
- Place of birth: Gorzów Wielkopolski, Poland
- Height: 1.86 m (6 ft 1 in)
- Position: Goalkeeper

Team information
- Current team: Lechia Zielona Góra
- Number: 26

Youth career
- –2011: Impuls Wawrów
- 2011–2013: UKS SMS Łódź
- 2013–2014: LUKS Bałucz

Senior career*
Years	Team	Apps	(Gls)
2014–2017	UKS SMS Łódź	2	(0)
2017–2022	Pogoń Szczecin II	35	(0)
2018–2022	Pogoń Szczecin	13	(0)
2022–2023	Skra Częstochowa	31	(0)
2024–	Lechia Zielona Góra	76	(0)
- * Club domestic league appearances and goals as of 22:51, 31 May 2026 (UTC)

Jakub Bursztyn (born 25 March 1998) is a Polish professional footballer who plays as a goalkeeper for and captains II liga club Lechia Zielona Góra.

== Honours ==
UKS SMS Łódź

- Klasa A Łódź II: 2015–16

Lechia Zielona Góra

- III liga, group III: 2025–26
- Polish Cup (Lubusz regionals): 2023–24, 2025–26
