= Kacper Kozłowski (footballer) =

Polish footballer (born 2003)

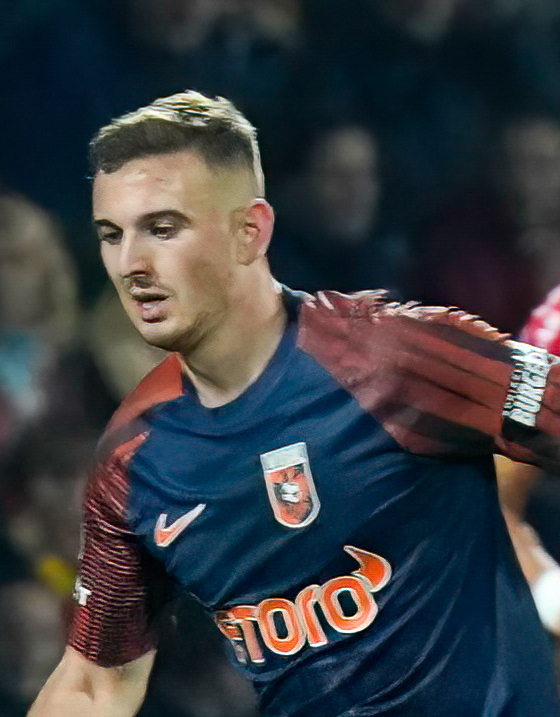
- Kozłowski playing for Vitesse in 2022

Personal information
- Full name: Kacper Szymon Kozłowski
- Date of birth: 16 October 2003 (age 23)
- Place of birth: Koszalin, Poland
- Height: 1.82 m (6 ft 0 in)
- Position: Midfielder

Team information
- Current team: Gaziantep
- Number: 10

Youth career
- 2013–2016: Bałtyk Koszalin
- 2016–2018: Pogoń Szczecin

Senior career*
Years	Team	Apps	(Gls)
2018–2020	Pogoń Szczecin II	25	(5)
2019–2022	Pogoń Szczecin	40	(4)
2022–2024	Brighton & Hove Albion	0	(0)
2022	→ Union SG (loan)	9	(0)
2022–2023	→ Vitesse (loan)	29	(2)
2023–2024	→ Vitesse (loan)	30	(3)
2024–	Gaziantep	58	(10)

International career^{‡}
2017–2018	Poland U15	8	(5)
2018–2019	Poland U17	17	(6)
2020	Poland U19	1	(0)
2021–2025	Poland U21	19	(3)
2021–	Poland	8	(0)
- * Club domestic league appearances and goals as of 09:57, 27 May 2026 (UTC) ‡ National team caps and goals as of 21:16, 3 June 2026 (UTC)

Kacper Szymon Kozłowski (born 16 October 2003) is a Polish professional footballer who plays as a midfielder for Süper Lig club Gaziantep and the Poland national team.

== Club career ==
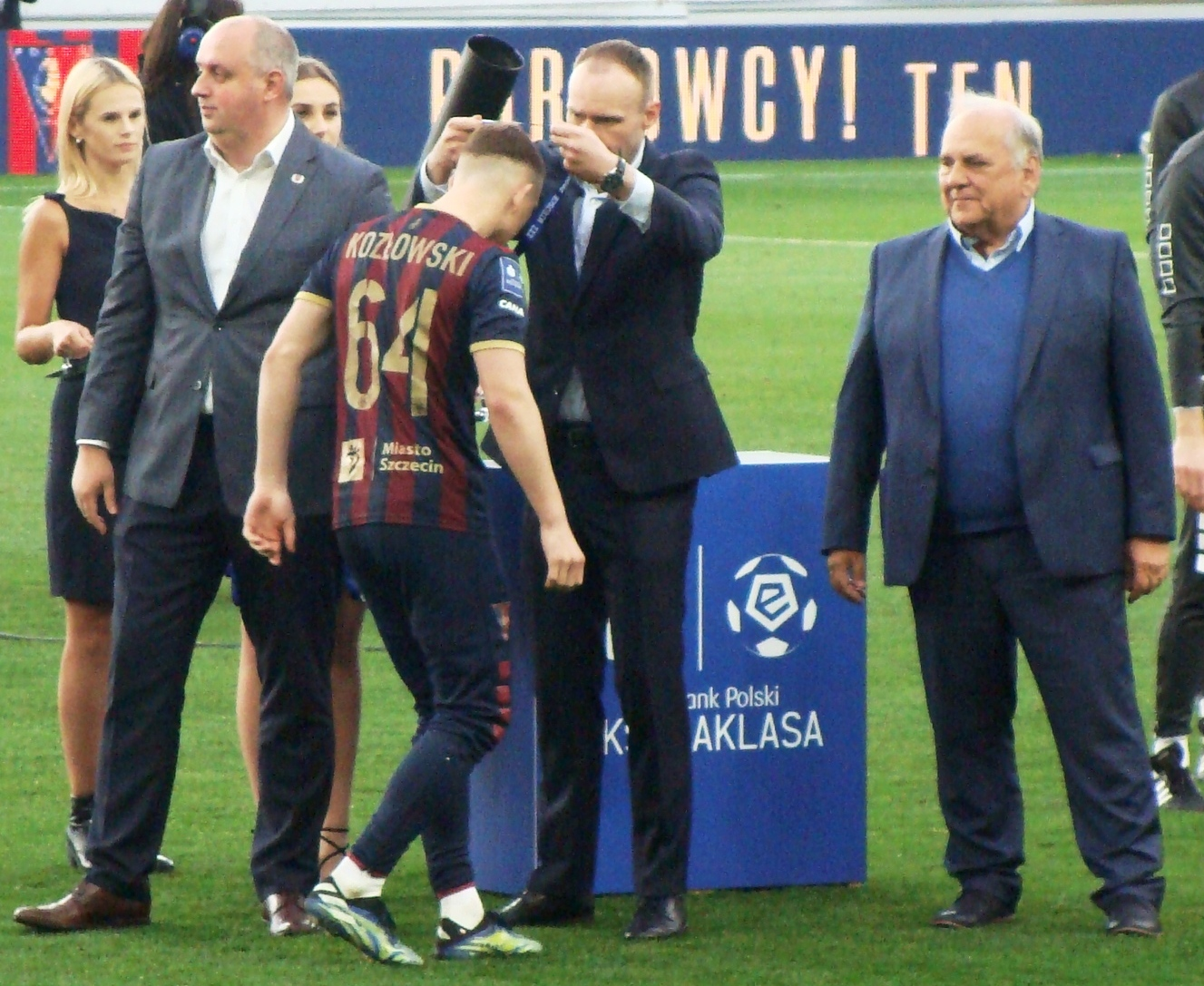
Kozłowski receiving a bronze medal in 2020–21 Ekstraklasa season during his time at Pogoń Szczecin

Kozłowski started his career with Pogoń Szczecin. In January 2022, he transferred to English Premier League side Brighton & Hove Albion for a reported fee of £8,000,000, where he was immediately loaned to Brighton's sister club Union SG of Belgian First Division A for the rest of the season.

In August 2022, Kozłowski joined Vitesse in the Netherlands on loan until the end of the 2022–23 season. On 18 July 2023, he rejoined Vitesse on another season-long loan spell.

On 19 July 2024, Kozłowski left Brighton to join Turkish club Gaziantep permanently for an undisclosed fee.

== International career ==
On 28 March 2021, Kozłowski debuted for the Polish senior team in a 2022 FIFA World Cup qualification against Andorra, which ended in a 3–0 victory for the Poles. At the age of 17 years and 163 days, he became the second youngest Polish international debutant behind Włodzimierz Lubański, who debuted at the age of 16 years and 188 days.

Kozłowski was included in Poland's squad for UEFA Euro 2020. In a 1–1 draw against Spain on 20 June 2021, he became the youngest footballer of any nationality to play at a European Championship – aged 17 years and 246 days – breaking the previous record of Jude Bellingham, who had broken the same record only six days prior. He kept the record until 2024, when Lamine Yamal debuted at the European Championship at 16 years and 338 days.

Kozłowski was named in the provisional squad for Poland for the 2022 FIFA World Cup campaign, but he was not included in the final 26-man squad.

== Personal life ==
On 10 January 2020, Kozłowski suffered a traffic accident that almost ended his football career. Whilst on his way to training for Pogon Szczecin with two of his teammates, their car was involved in a crash. Suffering the most severe injuries of the three, Kozłowski had broken his pelvis and broke three vertebrae in his lower back. Despite the near life-ending and career-threatening injury, he eventually recovered and returned to football. Speaking to Goal in 2021 about the accident, he said: "I couldn't train for almost half a year. It was a difficult time, but I focus on the here and now, not the past" and stated that the experience might help him mentally in the future having gone through it.

In the 2022 NXGN 50, Kozłowski was ranked as the 19th best football wonderkid.

== Career statistics ==
=== Club ===
As of match played 16 May 2026

Appearances and goals by club, season and competition
Club	Season	League			National cup (Note: Includes Polish Cup, KNVB Cup, Turkish Cup)		Europe		Other		Total	
Club	Season	Division	Apps	Goals	Apps	Goals	Apps	Goals	Apps	Goals	Apps	Goals
Pogoń Szczecin II	2018–19	III liga, group II	10	1	—		—		—		10	1
Pogoń Szczecin II	2019–20	III liga, group II	10	2	—		—		—		10	2
Pogoń Szczecin II	2020–21	III liga, group II	5	2	—		—		—		5	2
Pogoń Szczecin II	Total		25	5	—		—		—		25	5
Pogoń Szczecin	2018–19	Ekstraklasa	1	0	0	0	—		—		1	0
Pogoń Szczecin	2019–20	Ekstraklasa	3	0	0	0	—		—		3	0
Pogoń Szczecin	2020–21	Ekstraklasa	20	1	0	0	—		—		20	1
Pogoń Szczecin	2021–22	Ekstraklasa	16	3	1	0	2 (Note: Appearances in UEFA Europa Conference League)	0	—		19	3
Pogoń Szczecin	Total		40	4	1	0	2	0	—		43	4
Union SG (loan)	2021–22	Belgian First Division A	9	0	0	0	—		—		9	0
Vitesse (loan)	2022–23	Eredivisie	29	2	1	1	—		—		30	3
Vitesse (loan)	2023–24	Eredivisie	30	3	3	0	—		—		33	3
Vitesse (loan)	Total		59	5	4	0	—		—		63	6
Gaziantep	2024–25	Süper Lig	27	4	2	0	—		—		29	4
Gaziantep	2025–26	Süper Lig	31	6	3	0	—		—		34	6
Gaziantep	Total		58	10	5	0	—		—		63	10
Career total			191	24	10	0	2	0	0	0	203	25

=== International ===
As of match played 3 June 2026

Appearances and goals by national team and year
National team	Year	Apps	Goals
Poland
Poland	2021	6	0
Poland	2025	1	0
Poland	2026	1	0
Total		8	0

== Honours ==
Individual

- Polish Newcomer of the Year: 2021
- Ekstraklasa Young Player of the Month: December 2020
- NXGN (19th of 50): 2022
