= David Stec =

Austrian footballer

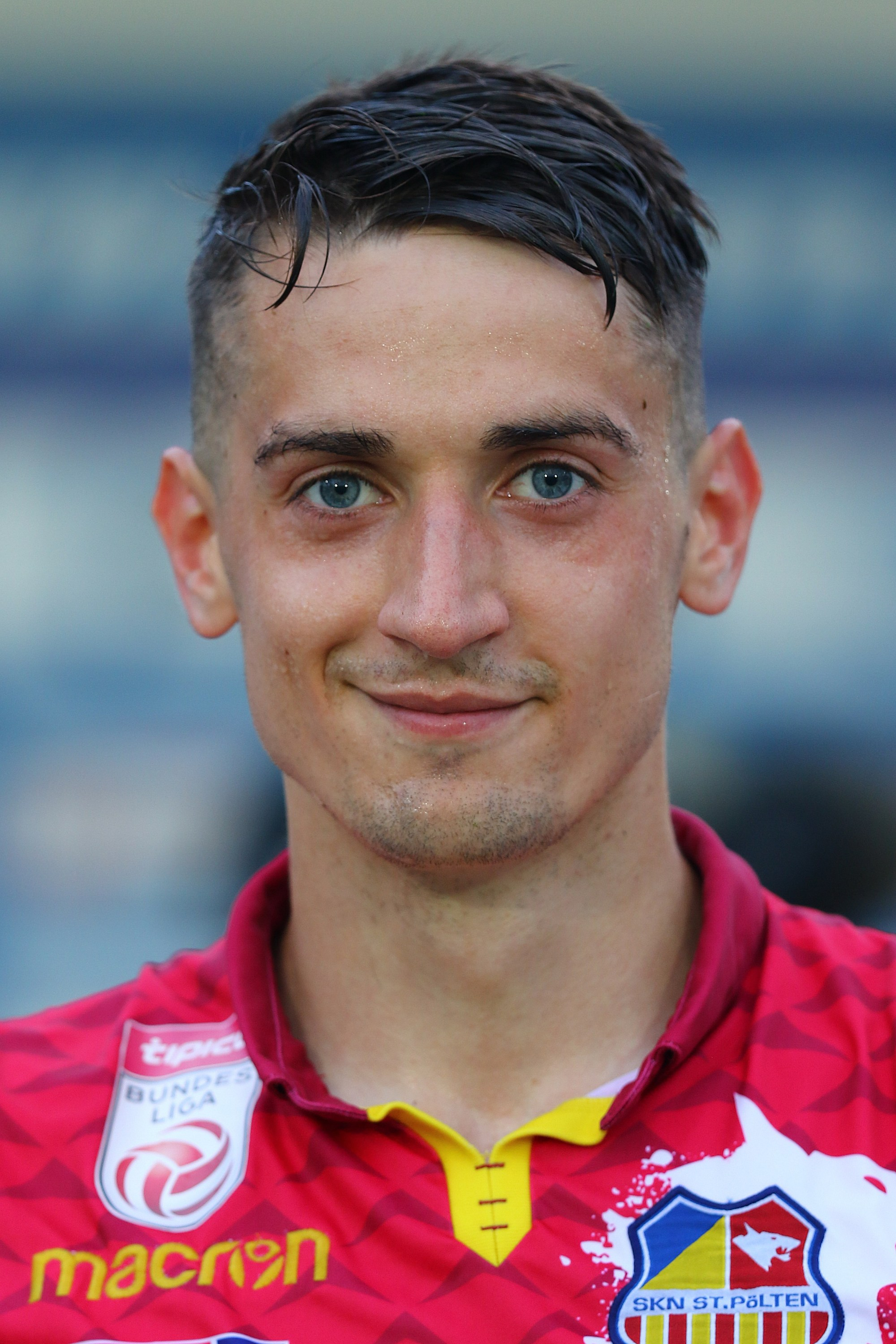

Personal information
- Date of birth: 10 May 1994 (age 32)
- Place of birth: Vienna, Austria
- Height: 1.79 m (5 ft 10 in)
- Position: Right-back

Senior career*
Years	Team	Apps	(Gls)
2012–2015	SKN St. Pölten II	46	(6)
2013–2018	SKN St. Pölten	123	(8)
2018–2021	Pogoń Szczecin	59	(1)
2021–2022	TSV Hartberg	15	(0)
2022–2024	Lechia Gdańsk	22	(0)

International career
2016	Austria U21	4	(0)
- * Club domestic league appearances and goals as of 10 May 2023

David Stec (born 10 May 1994) is an Austrian professional association football player who plays as a right-back.

== Club career ==
In the summer of 2021, he returned to Austria and signed a two-year contract with TSV Hartberg.

== Career statistics ==
As of 22 March 2019

Club statistics
Club	Season	League			Cup		Continental		Other		Total	
Club	Season	Division	Apps	Goals	Apps	Goals	Apps	Goals	Apps	Goals	Apps	Goals
St. Pölten	2013–14	Austrian Football First League	2	0	0	0	—				2	0
St. Pölten	2014–15	Austrian Football First League	26	2	3	0	4	0	—		33	2
St. Pölten	2015–16	Austrian Football First League	34	5	4	1	—				38	6
St. Pölten	2016–17	Austrian Football Bundesliga	34	0	4	0	—				38	0
St. Pölten	2017–18	Austrian Football Bundesliga	27	1	1	0	—		2 (Note: Appearance(s) in the Relegation play-offs)	0	28	1
St. Pölten	Total		123	8	12	1	4	0	2	0	139	9
St. Pölten II	2014–15	Austrian Regionalliga	1	0	—						1	0
Pogoń Szczecin	2018–19	Ekstraklasa	16	0	0	0	—				16	0
Career totals			140	8	12	1	4	0	2	0	156	9
