= Jakub Kiełb =

Polish footballer

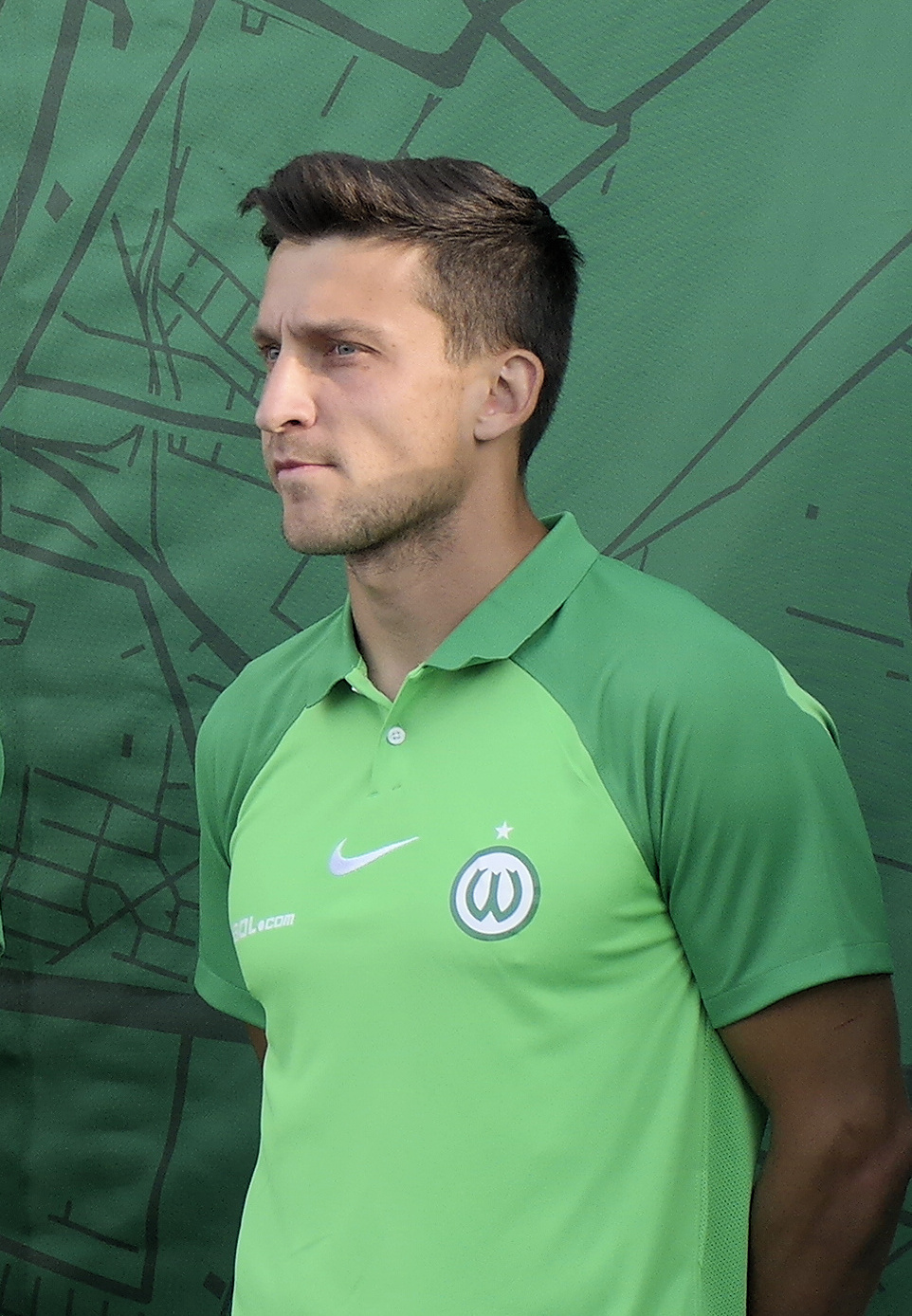
- Jakub Kiełb with Warta Poznań in 2023

Personal information
- Full name: Jakub Kiełb
- Date of birth: 15 July 1993 (age 33)
- Place of birth: Jarocin, Poland
- Height: 1.76 m (5 ft 9 in)
- Position: Left-back

Team information
- Current team: Unia Swarzędz
- Number: 45

Youth career
- Jarota Jarocin
- –2010: UKS SMS Łódź

Senior career*
Years	Team	Apps	(Gls)
2010–2011	UKS SMS Łódź	20	(0)
2011–2013	Tur Turek	44	(1)
2013	→ ŁKS Łódź (loan)	2	(0)
2013–2014	Bruk-Bet Termalica Nieciecza	18	(1)
2014–2015	Chrobry Głogów	5	(1)
2015–2016	Jarota Jarocin	17	(0)
2016–2025	Warta Poznań	223	(9)
2025–	Unia Swarzędz	25	(1)
- * Club domestic league appearances and goals as of 16:23, 4 June 2026 (UTC)

Jakub Kiełb (born 15 July 1993) is a Polish professional footballer who plays as a left-back for III liga club Unia Swarzędz.

== Career ==
On 7 February 2019, during a 2–0 win over Widzew Łódź, Kiełb earned a penalty for Warta Poznań with the score still at 0–0, but admitted that he was not fouled, causing the decision to be overturned and earning a fair play award.

== Career statistics ==
As of match played 1 May 2026

Appearances and goals by club, season and competition
Club	Season	League			Polish Cup		Europe		Other		Total	
Club	Season	Division	Apps	Goals	Apps	Goals	Apps	Goals	Apps	Goals	Apps	Goals
UKS SMS Łódź	2010–11	III liga, gr. A	20	0	—		—		—		20	0
Tur Turek	2011–12	II liga	16	1	1	0	—		—		17	1
Tur Turek	2012–13	II liga	28	0	2	0	—		—		30	0
Tur Turek	Total		44	1	3	0	—		—		47	1
ŁKS Łódź (loan)	2012–13	I liga	2	0	—		—		—		2	0
Termalica Bruk-Bet	2013–14	I liga	18	1	0	0	—		—		18	1
Chrobry Głogów	2014–15	I liga	5	1	2	0	—		—		7	1
Jarota Jarocin	2015–16	III liga, gr. D	17	0	—		—		—		17	0
Warta Poznań	2016–17	II liga	24	1	—		—		—		24	1
Warta Poznań	2017–18	II liga	20	1	0	0	—		—		20	1
Warta Poznań	2018–19	I liga	31	2	1	0	—		—		32	2
Warta Poznań	2019–20	I liga	30	3	1	0	—		2 (Note: Appearances in I liga promotion play-offs)	0	33	3
Warta Poznań	2020–21	Ekstraklasa	23	1	3	0	—		—		26	1
Warta Poznań	2021–22	Ekstraklasa	25	0	1	0	—		—		26	0
Warta Poznań	2022–23	Ekstraklasa	19	0	1	0	—		—		20	0
Warta Poznań	2023–24	Ekstraklasa	21	0	1	0	—		—		22	0
Warta Poznań	2024–25	I liga	28	1	0	0	—		—		28	1
Warta Poznań	Total		221	9	8	0	—		2	0	231	9
Unia Swarzędz	2025–26	III liga, gr. II	25	1	—		—		—		25	1
Career total			352	13	13	0	0	0	2	0	367	13
