= Falubaz Zielona Góra (football) =

Polish football club

KS Falubaz Zielona Góra
- Full name: Klub Sportowy Falubaz Zielona Góra
- Founded: 2010; 2015 (reformed)
- Dissolved: 2019 (became Lechia Zielona Góra)
- Ground: University Stadium, Zielona Góra (last season)
- Capacity: 1000
- Chairman: Michał Rzeczycki (last season)
- 2018–19 (last season): IV liga, 1st
Home colours	Away colours

KS Falubaz Zielona Góra was a football team founded by speedway fans of Falubaz in 2010. They started from the bottom of the football pyramid in the local amateur divisions. However, they have been promoted every year since their existence, four promotions in a row and started the 2014–15 season in IV liga, the fifth tier.

In the 2014–15 season, the club took first place in IV liga but formally resigned from the promotion and the club was withdrawn from all competitions. The club was reformed on the basis of UKP Zielona Góra which was already in that league and therefore Falubaz de facto kept its league place and continued its existence, despite formally reforming on the basis of another club. They continued until 2019, after winning the league when the club was handed over and formed the basis of the revival of the city's historic team Lechia Zielona Góra, itself the original basis of UKP Zielona Góra; Lechia continued Falubaz's place in the league pyramid.

== Bibliography ==
- Andrzej Flügel (29 June 2019). "Historia zielonogórskiego futbolu zatoczyła koło. Był Falubaz i znów jest Lechia". Gazeta Lubuska.
- "Skarb - KSF Zielona Góra". www.90minut.pl.
- "Skarb - Lechia Zielona Góra". www.90minut.pl.
- "Skarb - Falubaz Zielona Góra". www.90minut.pl.
- "Skarb - Falubaz II Zielona Góra". www.90minut.pl.
- "Skarb - Falubaz Zielona Góra (junior)". www.90minut.pl.
- "Falubaz Zielona Góra (minor junior)". www.90minut.pl.
- "UKP Zielona Góra". www.90minut.pl.
- "UKP Zielona Góra (junior)". www.90minut.pl.
- "UKP Zielona Góra (minor junior)". www.90minut.pl.
