= Benedikt Zech =

Austrian footballer

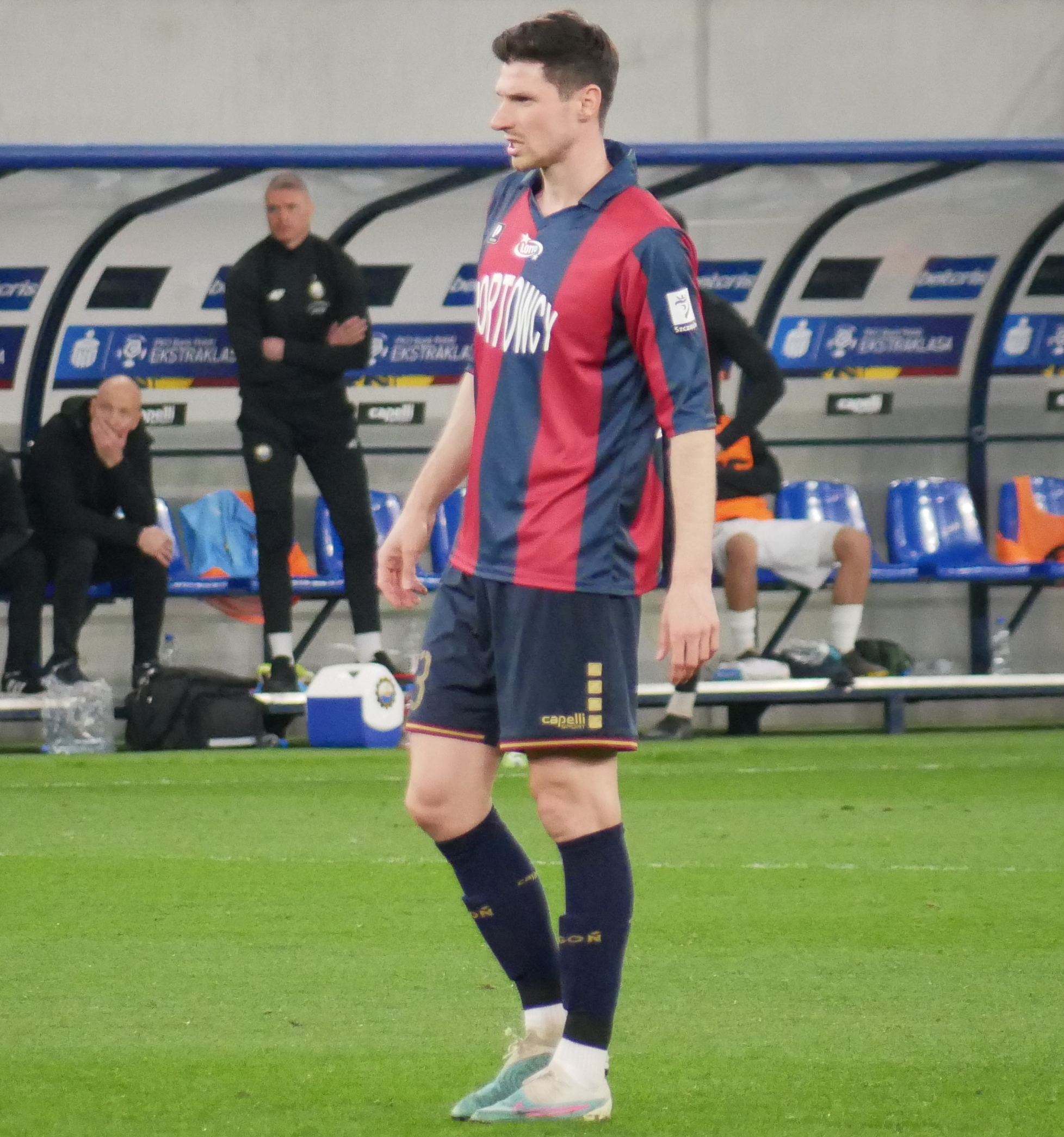
- Zech in 2023 with Pogoń Szczecin

Personal information
- Date of birth: 3 November 1990 (age 36)
- Place of birth: Feldkirch, Austria
- Height: 1.86 m (6 ft 1 in)
- Position: Centre-back

Team information
- Current team: Rheindorf Altach
- Number: 3

Youth career
- 1996–2005: SV Ludesch
- 2005–2009: AKA Vorarlberg

Senior career*
Years	Team	Apps	(Gls)
2009–2012	Austria Lustenau	57	(3)
2012–2019	Rheindorf Altach	187	(3)
2019–2024	Pogoń Szczecin	155	(0)
2025–	Rheindorf Altach	45	(0)
- * Club domestic league appearances and goals as of 10 June 2026

Benedikt Zech (born 3 November 1990) is an Austrian professional footballer who plays as a centre-back for Austrian Bundesliga club Rheindorf Altach.
