= Hubert Matynia =

Polish footballer

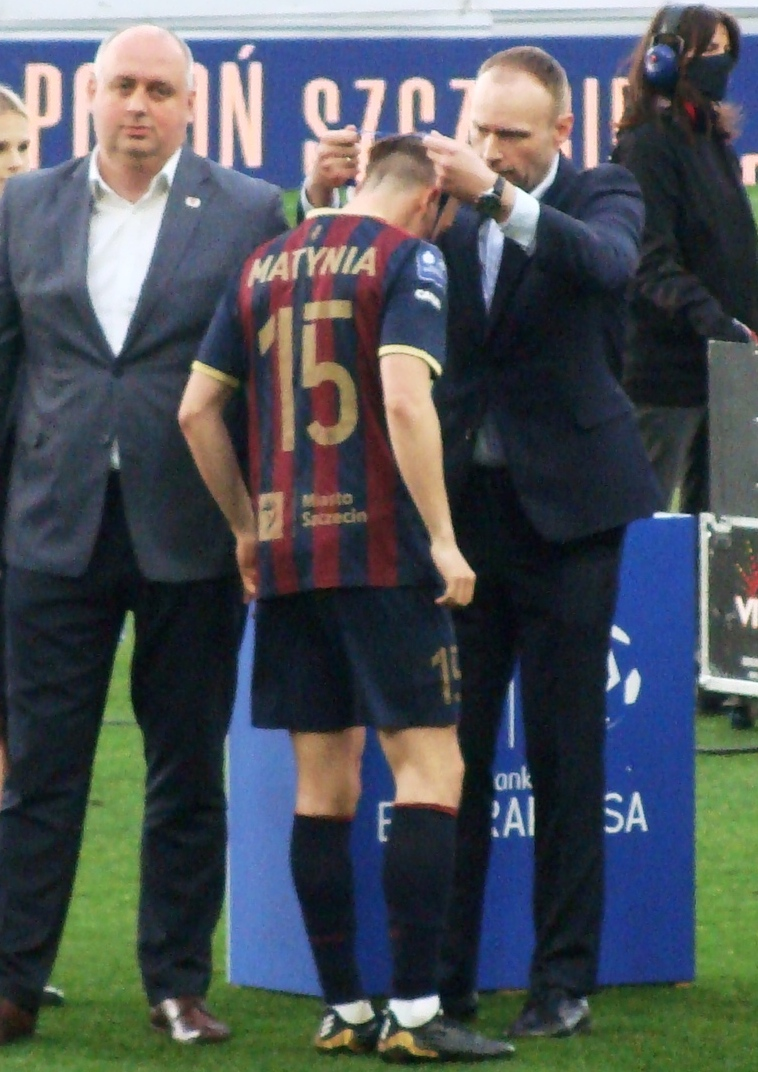
- Matynia with Pogoń Szczecin in 2021

Personal information
- Full name: Hubert Matynia
- Date of birth: 4 November 1995 (age 30)
- Place of birth: Września, Poland
- Height: 1.82 m (6 ft 0 in)
- Position: Left-back

Team information
- Current team: Stal Mielec
- Number: 5

Youth career
- –2013: Salos Szczecin

Senior career*
Years	Team	Apps	(Gls)
2013	Vineta Wolin	14	(6)
2014–2022	Pogoń Szczecin II	48	(3)
2014–2022	Pogoń Szczecin	120	(2)
2022–2023	Miedź Legnica	22	(0)
2023–2024	Zagłębie Sosnowiec	17	(1)
2024–2025	Olimpia Elbląg	18	(0)
2025–	Stal Mielec	21	(2)

International career
2014–2015	Poland U20	3	(0)
- * Club domestic league appearances and goals as of 20:49, 26 May 2026 (UTC)

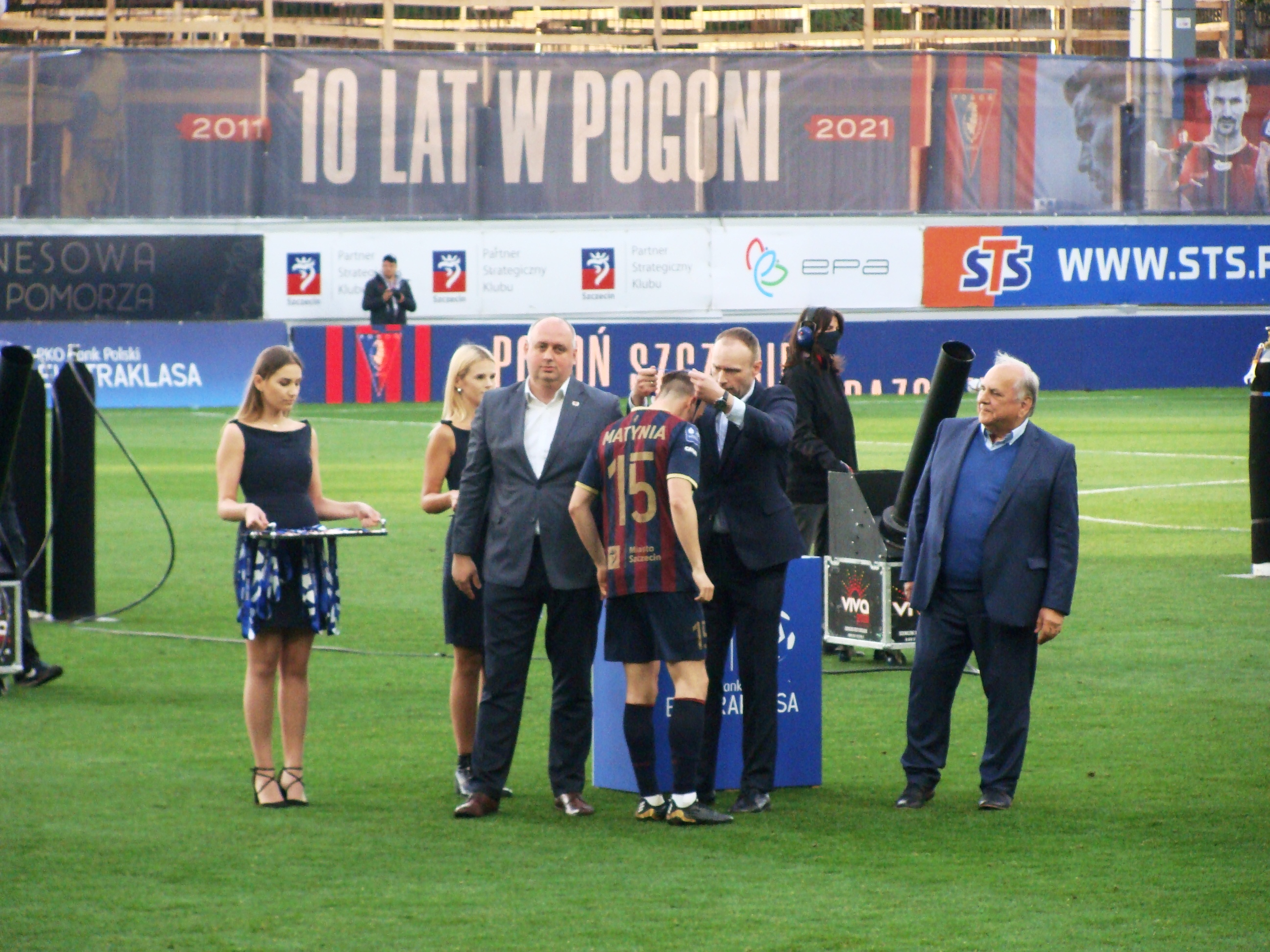
Matynia at the end of 2020–21 Ekstraklasa season with Pogoń Szczecin

Hubert Matynia (born 4 November 1995) is a Polish professional footballer who plays as a left-back for I liga club Stal Mielec.

== International career ==
Matynia made three appearances for the Poland U20 team.

On 5 November 2018, Matynia was called up for Poland by Jerzy Brzęczek for a friendly match against Czech Republic and for the 2018–19 UEFA Nations League game against Portugal.
