= Mariusz Malec =

Polish footballer (born 1995)

Personal information
- Date of birth: 4 April 1995 (age 31)
- Place of birth: Chorzów, Poland
- Height: 1.91 m (6 ft 3 in)
- Position: Centre-back

Team information
- Current team: Śląsk Wrocław
- Number: 44

Youth career
- –2014: Ruch Chorzów

Senior career*
Years	Team	Apps	(Gls)
2014–2016	Polonia Bytom	55	(4)
2016–2017	Olimpia Grudziądz	29	(0)
2017–2018	Podbeskidzie	34	(0)
2018–2025	Pogoń Szczecin	123	(1)
2018–2025	Pogoń Szczecin II	17	(0)
2025–	Śląsk Wrocław	29	(1)
- * Club domestic league appearances and goals as of 12:57, 26 May 2026 (UTC)

Mariusz Malec (born 4 April 1995) is a Polish professional footballer who plays as a centre-back for Ekstraklasa club Śląsk Wrocław.

== Honours ==
Polonia Bytom

- III liga Opole–Silesia: 2014–15
