= Kacper Smoliński =

Polish footballer (born 2001)

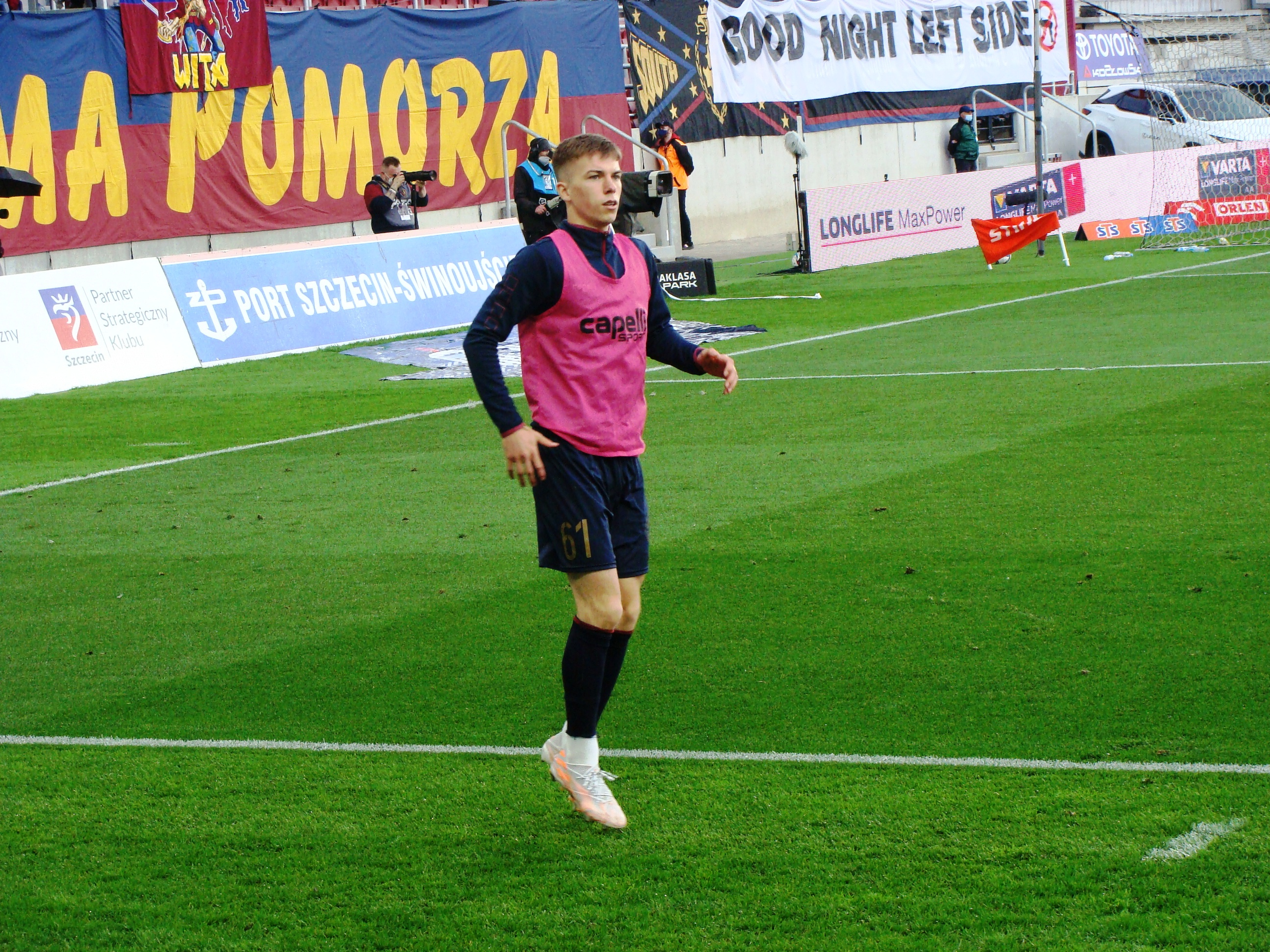
- Smoliński in 2021

Personal information
- Date of birth: 7 February 2001 (age 25)
- Place of birth: Police, Poland
- Height: 1.74 m (5 ft 9 in)
- Position: Midfielder

Team information
- Current team: Podbeskidzie
- Number: 16

Youth career
- Pogoń Szczecin

Senior career*
Years	Team	Apps	(Gls)
2018–2026	Pogoń Szczecin II	59	(4)
2019–2026	Pogoń Szczecin	72	(4)
2026–	Podbeskidzie	0	(0)

International career
2018–2019	Poland U18	5	(0)
2021	Poland U21	4	(1)
- * Club domestic league appearances and goals as of 09:14, 30 May 2026 (UTC)

Kacper Smoliński (born 7 February 2001) is a Polish professional footballer who plays as a midfielder for I liga club Podbeskidzie Bielsko-Biała.

== Honours ==
Pogoń Szczecin II

- Polish Cup (West Pomerania regionals): 2021–22, 2022–23
