= Tommy Doyle (English footballer) =

English footballer (born 2001)

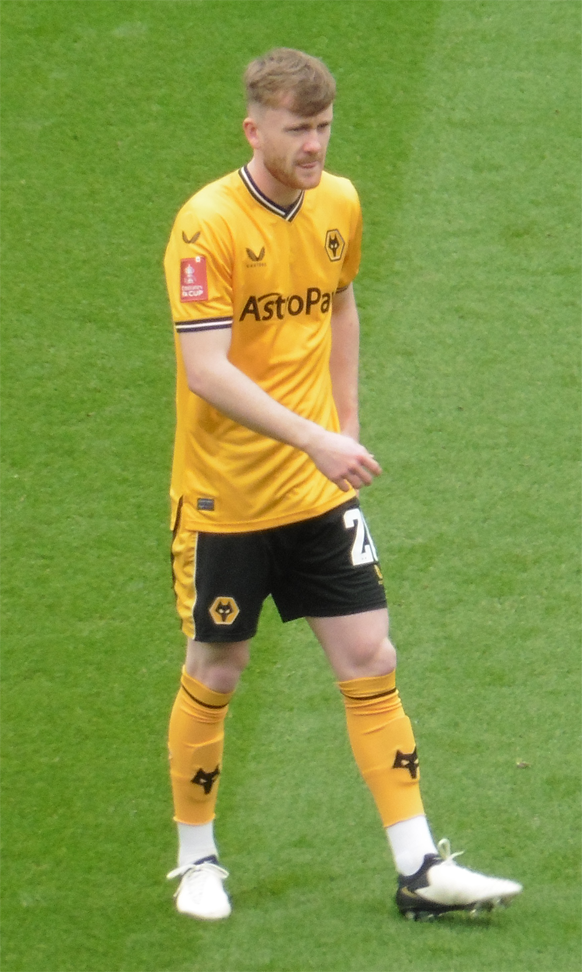
- Doyle playing for Wolverhampton Wanderers in 2024

Personal information
- Full name: Thomas Glyn Doyle
- Date of birth: 17 October 2001 (age 25)
- Place of birth: Manchester, England
- Height: 1.72 m (5 ft 8 in)
- Position: Central midfielder

Team information
- Current team: Wolverhampton Wanderers
- Number: 20

Youth career
- 2005–2009: Sandbach United
- 2009–2018: Manchester City

Senior career*
Years	Team	Apps	(Gls)
2019–2024	Manchester City	1	(0)
2021–2022	→ Hamburger SV (loan)	6	(1)
2022	→ Cardiff City (loan)	19	(2)
2022–2023	→ Sheffield United (loan)	33	(3)
2023–2024	→ Wolverhampton Wanderers (loan)	26	(1)
2024–	Wolverhampton Wanderers	24	(0)
2025–2026	→ Birmingham City (loan)	32	(0)

International career
2016–2017	England U16	8	(0)
2017–2018	England U17	11	(3)
2019	England U18	7	(2)
2019	England U19	5	(2)
2020	England U20	1	(0)
2021–2023	England U21	13	(0)
Medal record
Representing England
UEFA European Under-21 Championship
Winner	2023 Georgia–Romania
- * Club domestic league appearances and goals as of 01:10, 11 December 2025 (UTC)

Thomas Glyn Doyle (born 17 October 2001) is an English professional footballer who plays as a central midfielder for EFL Championship club Wolverhampton Wanderers.

== Early life ==
Doyle was born on 17 October 2001 in Manchester, England to Scott Doyle and Charlotte Pardoe, themselves the children of former Manchester City players Mike Doyle and Glyn Pardoe respectively.

== Club career ==
=== Early career ===
Doyle joined Sandbach United at the age of four, before joining Manchester City at the age of eight. Tommy turned down a loan move to Preston North End on deadline day in the autumn of 2020 with the intention of fighting for a place in the first team.

=== Manchester City ===
Doyle made his professional debut for Manchester City in a 3–1 EFL Cup win over Southampton on 29 October 2019. On 18 September 2020, he extended his contract until 2025.

==== Hamburger SV (loan) ====
On 31 August 2021, Doyle joined 2. Bundesliga club Hamburger SV on loan for the 2021–22 season.

==== Cardiff City (loan) ====
On 20 January 2022, Doyle joined EFL Championship side Cardiff City on loan until the end of the season. He scored his first goal for the club on 23 February 2022 in a 2–1 loss to Huddersfield Town.

==== Sheffield United (loan) ====
On 4 July 2022, Doyle joined Championship side Sheffield United on a season-long loan alongside Manchester City teammate James McAtee. Doyle scored the match winner for the Blades against Blackburn Rovers in the quarter-finals of the FA Cup on 19 March 2023, sending the club into the semi-finals of the competition for the first time since 2014. Despite this, alongside McAtee, he was unable to play in the semi-final against his parent club due to FA competition rules forbidding loan players from facing their parent clubs. He finished the season with 38 appearances, four goals and seven assists in all competitions and also won the club's Goal of the Season award for his goal against Blackburn Rovers in the FA Cup.

==== Wolverhampton Wanderers (loan) ====
On 1 September 2023, Doyle signed for Premier League club Wolves on a season-long loan deal. The deal contained an option to buy for a reported £4.3 million with a fifty percent sell on clause on any profit.

Doyle scored his first goal for Wolves in a 1–1 draw with Brentford in the third round of the FA Cup on 5 January 2024.

=== Wolverhampton Wanderers ===
On 3 May 2024, Wolves announced that they had activated the buy clause in their deal with Manchester City and that Doyle would join the club permanently on 1 July 2024.

==== Birmingham City (loan) ====
On 2 July 2025, Doyle joined newly promoted EFL Championship club Birmingham City on a season long loan for the duration of the 2025–26 season. He made his debut as a 77th minute substitute in Birmingham's opening day fixture against Ipswich Town.

== International career ==
Doyle was a member of the England under-17 squad that hosted the 2018 UEFA European Under-17 Championship. He scored a penalty in the opening game against Israel. The following fixture saw him score the winning goal against Italy. A metatarsal injury in the final group match against Switzerland ruled him out of the rest of the tournament.

On 13 October 2020, Doyle captained the England U20s on his debut for the age group during a 2–0 victory over Wales at St. George's Park.

On 27 August 2021, Doyle received his first call up for the England U21s. On 7 September 2021, he made his England U21 debut during the 2–0 2023 UEFA European Under-21 Championship qualification win over Kosovo U21s at Stadium MK.

On 14 June 2023, Doyle was included in the England squad for the 2023 UEFA European Under-21 Championship. He came off the bench as a late substitute in the final as England defeated Spain to win the tournament.

== Personal life ==
Doyle's paternal grandfather Mike Doyle and maternal grandfather Glyn Pardoe, were former professional footballers and long-time teammates at Manchester City. Both men played in the 1974 League Cup Final against Wolverhampton Wanderers, the club at which their grandson Tommy Doyle currently plays for (Wolves won that game 2–1 to lift the League Cup for the first time.)

Doyle is engaged to model and influencer Rebekah Doran, the couple have a daughter, Aurora, who was born in June 2025.

== Career statistics ==
As of match played 9 December 2025

Appearances and goals by club, season and competition
Club	Season	League			National cup (Note: Includes FA Cup, DFB-Pokal)		League cup (Note: Includes EFL Cup)		Europe		Other		Total	
Club	Season	Division	Apps	Goals	Apps	Goals	Apps	Goals	Apps	Goals	Apps	Goals	Apps	Goals
Manchester City U23	2019–20	—			—		—		—		4 (Note: Appearances in EFL Trophy)	3	4	3
Manchester City	2019–20	Premier League	1	0	1	0	1	0	0	0	0	0	3	0
Manchester City	2020–21	Premier League	0	0	2	0	1	0	1 (Note: Appearance in UEFA Champions League)	0	0	0	4	0
Manchester City	Total		1	0	3	0	2	0	1	0	4	3	11	3
Hamburger SV (loan)	2021–22	2. Bundesliga	6	1	1	0	—		—		—		7	1
Cardiff City (loan)	2021–22	Championship	19	2	1	0	—		—		—		20	2
Sheffield United (loan)	2022–23	Championship	33	3	4	1	1	0	—		—		38	4
Wolverhampton Wanderers (loan)	2023–24	Premier League	26	0	5	1	1	0	—		—		32	1
Wolverhampton Wanderers	2024–25	Premier League	24	0	0	0	2	1	—		—		26	1
Birmingham City (loan)	2025–26	EFL Championship	20	0	0	0	2	0	—		—		22	0
Career total			129	6	14	2	8	1	1	0	4	3	156	12

== Honours ==
Manchester City

- Premier League: 2020-21

England U21

- UEFA European Under-21 Championship: 2023
