= Carl Gustafsson =

Carl Gustafsson may refer to:

- Carl Gustafsson (ice hockey) (born 1989), Swedish ice hockey player
- Carl Gustafsson (footballer) (born 2000), Swedish footballer

== See also ==
- Charlie Gustafsson (born 1992), Swedish actor
