= 2023 UEFA European Under-21 Championship qualification play-offs =

The play-offs of the 2023 UEFA European Under-21 Championship qualifying competition involved eight of the nine runners-up in the qualifying group stage, the top-ranked team being directly qualified for the tournament.

== Ranking of second-placed teams ==
Only the results of the second-placed teams against the first, third, fourth and fifth-placed teams in their group were taken into account, while results against the sixth-placed team in six-team groups were not included. As a result, eight matches played by each second-placed team were counted for the purposes of determining the ranking. The top-ranked team qualified directly for the final tournament, while the other teams entered the play-offs.

Pos	Grp	Team	Pld	W	D	L	GF	GA	GD	Pts	Qualification
1	E	Switzerland	8	5	2	1	14	6	+8	17	Final tournament
2	H	Ukraine	8	5	2	1	16	10	+6	17	Play-offs
3	I	Denmark	8	5	2	1	12	6	+6	17	Play-offs
4	A	Croatia	8	5	1	2	19	10	+9	16	Play-offs
5	G	Czech Republic	8	5	1	2	13	6	+7	16	Play-offs
6	C	Slovakia	8	5	0	3	18	10	+8	15	Play-offs
7	F	Republic of Ireland	8	5	0	3	13	9	+4	15	Play-offs
8	B	Israel	8	4	1	3	13	10	+3	13	Play-offs
9	D	Iceland	8	3	3	2	13	7	+6	12	Play-offs

Rules for classification: 1) points; 2) goal difference; 3) goals scored; 4) away goals scored; 5) wins; 6) away wins; 7) disciplinary points; 8) coefficient ranking.

== Draw ==
The draw for the play-offs was held on 21 June 2022 in Nyon, Switzerland.

== Summary ==
The four play-off winners qualified for the final tournament.

Team 1	Agg.	Team 2	1st leg	2nd leg
Croatia	3–3 (5–4 p)	Denmark	2–1	1–2 (a.e.t.)
Slovakia	3–5	Ukraine	3–2	0–3
Republic of Ireland	1–1 (1–3 p)	Israel	1–1	0–0 (a.e.t.)
Iceland	1–2	Czech Republic	1–2	0–0

== Matches ==
All times are CEST (UTC+2), as listed by UEFA (local times, if different, are in parentheses).

23 September 2022
18:00

Croatia	2–1	Denmark
Vidović 9'; Beljo 37'	Report	Tengstedt 59'

Stadion Aldo Drosina, Pula
Attendance: 4,225
Referee: Goga Kikacheishvili (Georgia)
27 September 2022
18:00

Denmark	2–1 (a.e.t.)	Croatia
O'Riley 10'; Frendrup 19'	Report	Matanović 84'
Penalties
Dyhr (penalty scored); Grønbæk (penalty scored); Jørgensen (penalty scored); Kristensen (penalty missed); Madsen (penalty scored); Ross (penalty missed)	4–5	(penalty scored) Vušković; (penalty scored) Fruk; (penalty scored) Soldo; (penalty missed) Matanović; (penalty scored) Sučić; (penalty scored) Pašalić

Vejle Stadium, Vejle
Attendance: 4,063
Referee: Sebastian Gishamer (Austria)

3–3 on aggregate. Croatia won 5–4 on penalties and qualified for the 2023 UEFA European Under-21 Championship.

23 September 2022
18:00

Slovakia	3–2	Ukraine
Suslov 10'; Strelec 46', 53'	Report	Viunnyk 17'; Kryskiv 49'

Štadión pod Dubňom, Žilina
Attendance: 4,059
Referee: Allard Lindhout (Netherlands)
27 September 2022
17:30

Ukraine	3–0	Slovakia
Sikan 48', 54', 66'	Report

Stadion Miejski, Bielsko-Biała (Poland)
Attendance: 2,535
Referee: Rohit Saggi (Norway)

Ukraine won 5–3 on aggregate and qualified for the 2023 UEFA European Under-21 Championship.

23 September 2022
20:00 (19:00 IST)

Republic of Ireland	1–1	Israel
Ferguson 65'	Report	Gorno 45'

Tallaght Stadium, Dublin
Attendance: 6,786
Referee: Dario Bel (Croatia)
27 September 2022
19:15 (20:15 IST)

Israel	0–0 (a.e.t.)	Republic of Ireland
	Report
Penalties
Karzev (penalty scored); Peretz (penalty scored); Cohen (penalty missed); Davida (penalty scored)	3–1	(penalty scored) Coventry; (penalty missed) Wright; (penalty missed) Ferguson; (penalty missed) Devoy

Bloomfield Stadium, Tel Aviv
Attendance: 22,752
Referee: Nathan Verboomen (Belgium)

1–1 on aggregate. Israel won 3–1 on penalties and qualified for the 2023 UEFA European Under-21 Championship.

23 September 2022
18:00 (16:00 UTC±0)

Iceland	1–2	Czech Republic
Magnússon 26' (pen.)	Report	Valenta 33'; Sejk 70'

Víkingsvöllur, Reykjavík
Attendance: 725
Referee: Gergo Bogár (Hungary)
27 September 2022
18:00

Czech Republic	0–0	Iceland
	Report

Stadion Střelecký ostrov, České Budějovice
Attendance: 5,721
Referee: Morten Krogh (Denmark)

Czech Republic won 2–1 on aggregate and qualified for the 2023 UEFA European Under-21 Championship.

== Goalscorers ==
There were 19 goals scored in 8 matches, for an average of 2.38 goals per match.

3 goals

- (Ukraine) Danylo Sikan

2 goals

- (Slovakia) David Strelec

1 goal

- (Croatia) Dion Drena Beljo
- (Croatia) Igor Matanović
- (Croatia) Gabriel Vidović
- (Czech Republic) Václav Sejk
- (Czech Republic) Matěj Valenta
- (Denmark) Morten Frendrup
- (Denmark) Matt O'Riley
- (Denmark) Casper Tengstedt
- (Iceland) Sævar Atli Magnússon
- (Israel) Idan Gorno
- (Republic of Ireland) Evan Ferguson
- (Slovakia) Tomáš Suslov
- (Ukraine) Dmytro Kryskiv
- (Ukraine) Bohdan Vyunnyk
