= 2023 UEFA European Under-21 Championship qualification Group F =

Football tournament qualification stage

Group F of the 2023 UEFA European Under-21 Championship qualifying competition consisted of six teams: Italy, Sweden, Republic of Ireland, Bosnia and Herzegovina, Montenegro, and Luxembourg. The composition of the nine groups in the qualifying group stage was decided by the draw held on 28 January 2021, 12:00 CET (UTC+1), at the UEFA headquarters in Nyon, Switzerland, with the teams seeded according to their coefficient ranking.

== Standings ==
Pos	Team	Pld	W	D	L	GF	GA	GD	Pts	Qualification	Italy	Ireland	Sweden	Bosnia and Herzegovina	Montenegro	Luxembourg
1	Italy	10	7	3	0	19	5	+14	24	Final tournament	—	4–1	1–1	1–0	1–0	3–0
2	Republic of Ireland	10	6	1	3	16	10	+6	19	Play-offs	0–2	—	1–0	3–0	3–1	2–0
3	Sweden	10	5	3	2	22	8	+14	18		1–1	0–2	—	4–0	3–1	6–0
4	Bosnia and Herzegovina	10	3	2	5	9	16	−7	11		1–2	0–2	1–1	—	2–1	1–0
5	Montenegro	10	3	2	5	14	17	−3	11		1–1	2–1	1–3	2–2	—	3–0
6	Luxembourg	10	0	1	9	2	26	−24	1		0–3	1–1	0–3	0–2	1–2	—

Source: UEFA
Rules for classification: Tiebreakers

== Matches ==
Times are CET/CEST, (Note: CEST (UTC+2) for dates between 31 March and 26 October 2021 and between 29 March and 24 October 2022, and CET (UTC+1) for all other dates.) as listed by UEFA (local times, if different, are in parentheses).

29 March 2021
18:00

Montenegro	2–2	Bosnia and Herzegovina
Barišić 56' (o.g.); Ražnatović 67'	Report	N. Krstović 48' (o.g.); Bašić 58'

DG Arena Lješkopolje, Podgorica
Attendance: 0
Referee: Fedayi San (Switzerland)

4 June 2021
19:15

Luxembourg	1–2	Montenegro
Olesen 42'	Report	Babić 8'; N. Krstović 79'

Stade de la Frontière, Esch-sur-Alzette
Attendance: 450
Referee: Manfredas Lukjančukas (Lithuania)

8 June 2021
16:45

Sweden	6–0	Luxembourg
Holm 7', 61'; Prica 12'; Elanga 48'; Wålemark 67', 90+4'	Report

Falcon Alkoholfri Arena, Falkenberg
Attendance: 421
Referee: David Munro (Scotland)

3 September 2021
16:30

Bosnia and Herzegovina	0–2	Republic of Ireland
	Report	Wright 52' (pen.); Coventry 73'

Bosnia and Herzegovina FA Training Centre, Zenica
Attendance: 100
Referee: Kristoffer Hagenes (Norway)
3 September 2021
17:30

Italy	3–0	Luxembourg
Pirola 7'; Olesen 11' (o.g.); Cancellieri 50'	Report

Stadio Carlo Castellani, Empoli
Attendance: 864
Referee: Peter Kralović (Slovenia)
3 September 2021
20:30

Montenegro	1–3	Sweden
I. Vukčević 62'	Report	Elanga 50', 64'; Sarr 80'

City Stadium, Podgorica
Attendance: 285
Referee: Urs Schnyder (Switzerland)

7 September 2021
16:00

Luxembourg	1–1	Republic of Ireland
Kuete 84' (pen.)	Report	Whelan 70'

Stade Jos Nosbaum, Dudelange
Attendance: 278
Referee: Loukas Sotiriou (Cyprus)
7 September 2021
16:30

Bosnia and Herzegovina	1–1	Sweden
Mašić 65' (pen.)	Report	Nygren 45+1'

Bosnia and Herzegovina FA Training Centre, Zenica
Attendance: 0
Referee: Rob Harvey (Republic of Ireland)
7 September 2021
17:30

Italy	1–0	Montenegro
Colombo 53'	Report

Stadio Romeo Menti, Vicenza
Attendance: 1,084
Referee: Espen Eskås (Norway)

8 October 2021
17:30

Bosnia and Herzegovina	1–2	Italy
Barišić 80'	Report	Okoli 19'; Vignato 27'

Bilino Polje Stadium, Zenica
Attendance: 0
Referee: Peter Kjaesgaard (Denmark)
8 October 2021
18:00

Sweden	3–1	Montenegro
Al Hajj 35'; Gigović 51'; Elanga 68'	Report	Sijarić 82'

Olympia, Helsingborg
Attendance: 817
Referee: Thorvaldur Árnason (Iceland)
8 October 2021
18:15 (17:15 UTC+1)

Republic of Ireland	2–0	Luxembourg
Kayode 18'; Coventry 64' (pen.)	Report

Tallaght Stadium, Dublin
Attendance: 1,426
Referee: Besfort Kasumi (Kosovo)

12 October 2021
16:30

Luxembourg	0–2	Bosnia and Herzegovina
	Report	Savić 57'; Dedić 60'

Stade Émile Mayrisch, Esch-sur-Alzette
Attendance: 213
Referee: Andrew Davey (Northern Ireland)
12 October 2021
17:30

Montenegro	2–1	Republic of Ireland
N. Krstović 4'; I. Vukčević 9'	Report	McGuinness 74'

City Stadium, Podgorica
Attendance: 278
Referee: Barbeno Luca (San Marino)
12 October 2021
17:30

Italy	1–1	Sweden
Lucca 42'	Report	Prica 90+2'

Stadio Brianteo, Monza
Attendance: 2,200
Referee: António Nobre (Portugal)

12 November 2021
18:00

Sweden	4–0	Bosnia and Herzegovina
Elanga 24' (pen.), 75'; Wålemark 45+2'; Nygren 77'	Report

Borås Arena, Borås
Attendance: 2,513
Referee: Dumitri Muntean (Moldova)
12 November 2021
18:30 (17:30 UTC±0)

Republic of Ireland	0–2	Italy
	Report	Lucca 31'; Cancellieri 90'

Tallaght Stadium, Dublin
Attendance: 2,161
Referee: Horatiu Fesnic (Romania)

16 November 2021
17:00

Bosnia and Herzegovina	2–1	Montenegro
Memić 61'; Savić 90'+2'	Report	N. Krstović 42'

Stadion Grbavica, Sarajevo
Attendance: 120
Referee: Rohit Saggi (Norway)
16 November 2021
18:30 (17:30 UTC±0)

Republic of Ireland	1–0	Sweden
O'Neill 90+3'	Report

Tallaght Stadium, Dublin
Attendance: 1,535
Referee: Peter Kráľovič (Slovakia)

25 March 2022
15:00

Bosnia and Herzegovina	1–0	Luxembourg
Bašić 6'	Report

Stadion Grbavica, Sarajevo
Attendance: 320
Referee: Helgi Mikael Jónasson (Iceland)
25 March 2022
18:30

Montenegro	1–1	Italy
Rakonjac 37'	Report	Ricci 39'

City Stadium, Podgorica
Attendance: 662
Referee: Balázs Berke (Hungary)

29 March 2022
17:30

Italy	1–0	Bosnia and Herzegovina
Rovella 14'	Report

Stadio Nereo Rocco, Trieste
Attendance: 2,191
Referee: Nicolas Laforge (Belgium)
29 March 2022
18:00

Sweden	0–2	Republic of Ireland
	Report	Tierney 12'; Wright 89'

Borås Arena, Borås
Attendance: 1545
Referee: Vitor Ferreira (Portugal)

2 June 2022
19:30

Luxembourg	0–3	Sweden
	Report	Sarr 30' (pen.); Hussein 53'; Wålemark 67' (pen.)

Stade Émile Mayrisch, Esch-sur-Alzette
Attendance: 305
Referee: Urs Schnyder (Switzerland)

3 June 2022
20:30 (19:30 UTC+1)

Republic of Ireland	3–0	Bosnia and Herzegovina
Smallbone 16', 81'; Odubeko 63'	Report

Tallaght Stadium, Dublin
Attendance: 3,057
Referee: Luca Cibelli (Switzerland)

6 June 2022
18:00 (17:00 UTC+1)

Republic of Ireland	3–1	Montenegro
Smallbone 41'; Kerrigan 57'; Wright 67'	Report	Đukanović 76'

Tallaght Stadium, Dublin
Attendance: 3,126
Referee: Jan Petrik (Czech Republic)
6 June 2022
18:30

Luxembourg	0–3	Italy
	Report	Vignato 20'; Pellegri 33'; Gaetano 54'

Stade Municipal de la Ville de Differdange, Differdange
Attendance: 1,890
Referee: Elchin Masiyev (Azerbaijan)

9 June 2022
18:00

Sweden	1–1	Italy
Gustafsson 9'	Report	Rovella 58' (pen.)

Olympia, Helsingborg
Attendance: 3370
Referee: Nathan Verboomen (Belgium)

10 June 2022
20:15

Montenegro	3–0	Luxembourg
Đukanović 1' (pen.); Babić 10'; Krivokapić 56'	Report

DG Arena Lješkopolje, Podgorica
Attendance: 150
Referee: Philip Farrugia (Malta)

14 June 2022
17:30

Italy	4–1	Republic of Ireland
Rovella 20' (pen.); Cambiaghi 35'; Pellegri 46'; Quagliata 85'	Report	Coventry 61' (pen.)

Stadio Cino e Lillo Del Duca, Ascoli Piceno
Attendance: 4,450
Referee: Gergő Bogár (Hungary)

== Goalscorers ==
There were 82 goals scored in 30 matches, for an average of 2.73 goals per match.

6 goals

- (Sweden) Anthony Elanga

4 goals

- (Sweden) Patrik Wålemark

3 goals

- (Italy) Nicolò Rovella
- (Montenegro) Nikola Krstović
- (Republic of Ireland) Conor Coventry
- (Republic of Ireland) Will Smallbone
- (Republic of Ireland) Tyreik Wright

2 goals

- (Bosnia and Herzegovina) Ivan Bašić
- (Bosnia and Herzegovina) Milan Savić
- (Italy) Matteo Cancellieri
- (Italy) Lorenzo Lucca
- (Italy) Pietro Pellegri
- (Italy) Emanuel Vignato
- (Montenegro) Anto Babić
- (Montenegro) Viktor Đukanović
- (Montenegro) Ivan Vukčević
- (Sweden) Emil Holm
- (Sweden) Benjamin Nygren
- (Sweden) Tim Prica
- (Sweden) Amin Sarr

1 goal

- (Bosnia and Herzegovina) Adrian Barišić
- (Bosnia and Herzegovina) Amar Dedić
- (Bosnia and Herzegovina) Anes Mašić
- (Bosnia and Herzegovina) Amar Memić
- (Italy) Nicolò Cambiaghi
- (Italy) Lorenzo Colombo
- (Italy) Gianluca Gaetano
- (Italy) Caleb Okoli
- (Italy) Lorenzo Pirola
- (Italy) Giacomo Quagliata
- (Italy) Samuele Ricci
- (Luxembourg) Dylan Kuete
- (Luxembourg) Mathias Olesen
- (Montenegro) Matija Krivokapić
- (Montenegro) Marko Rakonjac
- (Montenegro) Andrija Ražnatović
- (Montenegro) Omar Sijarić
- (Republic of Ireland) Joshua Kayode
- (Republic of Ireland) Liam Kerrigan
- (Republic of Ireland) Mark McGuinness
- (Republic of Ireland) Mipo Odubeko
- (Republic of Ireland) Ollie O'Neill
- (Republic of Ireland) Ross Tierney
- (Republic of Ireland) Colm Whelan
- (Sweden) Rami Al Hajj
- (Sweden) Armin Gigović
- (Sweden) Carl Gustafsson
- (Sweden) Bilal Hussein

1 own goal

- (Bosnia and Herzegovina) Adrian Barišić (against Montenegro)
- (Luxembourg) Mathias Olesen (against Italy)
- (Montenegro) Nikola Krstović (against Bosnia and Herzegovina)
