= 2023 UEFA European Under-21 Championship final =

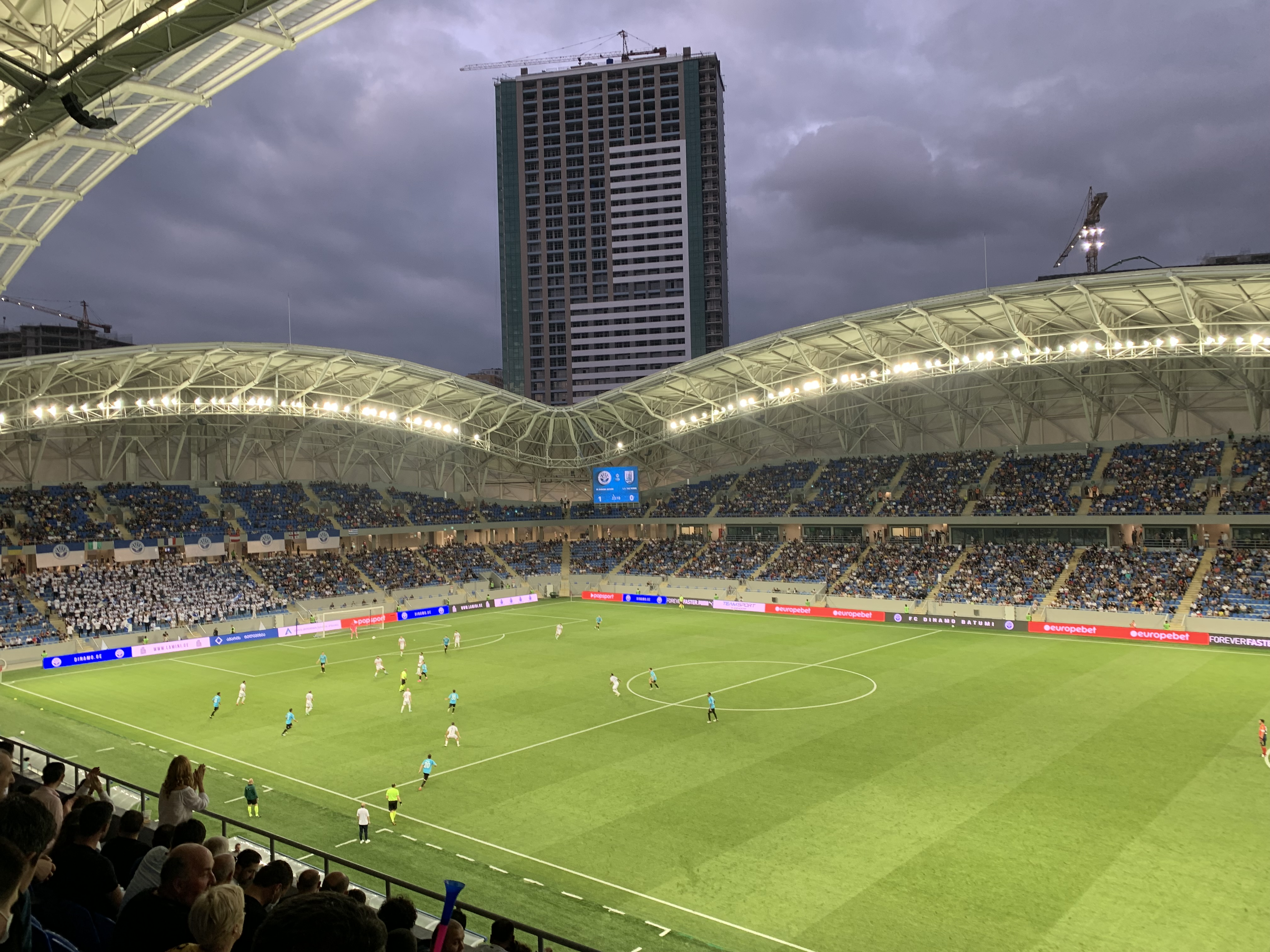
- The Adjarabet Arena in Batumi hosted the final.
- Event: 2023 UEFA European Under-21 Championship
England	Spain
(England)	(Spain)
1	0
- Date: 8 July 2023
- Venue: Adjarabet Arena, Batumi
- Man of the Match: Curtis Jones (England)
- Referee: Espen Eskås (Norway)
- Attendance: 18,498
- Weather: Partly cloudy night 24 °C (75 °F); 88% humidity

The 2023 UEFA European Under-21 Championship final was a football match that took place on 8 July 2023 at the Adjarabet Arena in Batumi, Georgia, to determine the winners of the 2023 UEFA European Under-21 Championship. The match was contested by England and Spain.

England won the match 1–0 for their first UEFA European Under-21 Championship title since 1984 and the third title overall. Curtis Jones scored the winning goal, when Cole Palmer's free-kick deflected in off him, while James Trafford dramatically saved a late penalty from Abel Ruiz eight minutes into stoppage time.

== Route to the final ==
England
Round
Spain
Opponents
Result
Group stage
Opponents
Result
Czech Republic
2–0
Match 1
Romania
3–0
Israel
2–0
Match 2
Croatia
1–0
Germany
2–0
Match 3
Ukraine
2–2
Group C winners

Pos	Team	Pld	Pts
1	England	3	9
2	Israel	3	4
3	Czech Republic	3	3
4	Germany	3	1

Source: UEFA
Final standings
Group B winners

Pos	Team	Pld	Pts
1	Spain	3	7
2	Ukraine	3	7
3	Croatia	3	1
4	Romania (H)	3	1

Source: UEFA
(H) Hosts
Opponents
Result
Knockout stage
Opponents
Result
Portugal
1–0
Quarter-finals
Switzerland
2–1 (a.e.t.)
Israel
3–0
Semi-finals
Ukraine
5–1

== Match details ==
8 July 2023
20:00

England	1–0	Spain
Jones 45+4'	Report

Adjarabet Arena, Batumi
Attendance: 18,498
Referee: Espen Eskås (Norway)

England	Spain

GK	1	James Trafford	(yellow card) 74'
RB	14	James Garner
CB	4	Levi Colwill	(yellow card) 45+6'
CB	5	Taylor Harwood-Bellis (c)
LB	2	Max Aarons
RM	10	Emile Smith Rowe		(substituted off) 66'
CM	17	Curtis Jones
CM	21	Angel Gomes	(yellow card) 24'	(substituted off) 73'
LM	20	Cole Palmer		(substituted off) 82'
CF	7	Morgan Gibbs-White	(yellow card) 69' (yellow-red card) 90+12'	(substituted off) 73'
CF	11	Anthony Gordon		(substituted off) 82'
Substitutions:
MF	23	Noni Madueke		(substituted on) 66'
FW	9	Cameron Archer		(substituted on) 73'
MF	6	Oliver Skipp		(substituted on) 73'
MF	19	Harvey Elliott		(substituted on) 82'
MF	18	Tommy Doyle		(substituted on) 82'
Other disciplinary actions:
TS	—	Ashley Cole	(red card) 45+6'
Manager:
Lee Carsley

GK	1	Arnau Tenas
RB	2	Víctor Gómez		(substituted off) 73'
CB	14	Aitor Paredes
CB	5	Jon Pacheco
LB	3	Juan Miranda
CM	6	Antonio Blanco	(yellow card) 37' (yellow-red card) 90+12'	(substituted off) 83'
CM	16	Álex Baena	(yellow card) 34'	(substituted off) 59'
AM	8	Oihan Sancet	(yellow card) 45+6'	(substituted off) 59'
RF	10	Rodri Sánchez		(substituted off) 59'
CF	9	Abel Ruiz (c)
LF	17	Sergio Gómez
Substitutions:
MF	18	Gabri Veiga		(substituted on) 59'
MF	19	Aimar Oroz	(yellow card) 62'	(substituted on) 59'
FW	7	Rodrigo Riquelme	(yellow card) 86'	(substituted on) 59'
FW	11	Ander Barrenetxea		(substituted on) 73'
FW	21	Sergio Camello		(substituted on) 83'
Other disciplinary actions:
TS	—	Carlos Rivera	(red card) 45+6'
Manager:
Santi Denia			(yellow card) 77'

Man of the Match:
Curtis Jones (England)

Assistant referees:
Jan Erik Engan (Norway)
Isaak Elias Bashevkin (Norway)
Fourth official:
Rade Obrenovič (Slovenia)
Video assistant referee:
Christian Dingert (Germany)
Assistant video assistant referees:
Bartosz Frankowski (Poland)
Tiago Martins (Portugal)

Match rules

- 90 minutes.
- 30 minutes of extra time if necessary.
- Penalty shoot-out if scores still level.
- Maximum of twelve named substitutes.
- Maximum of five substitutions, with a sixth allowed in extra time. (Note: Each team was given only three opportunities to make substitutions, with a fourth opportunity in extra time, excluding substitutions made at half-time, before the start of extra time and at half-time in extra time.)
