= Emanuel Aiwu =

Austrian footballer (born 2000)

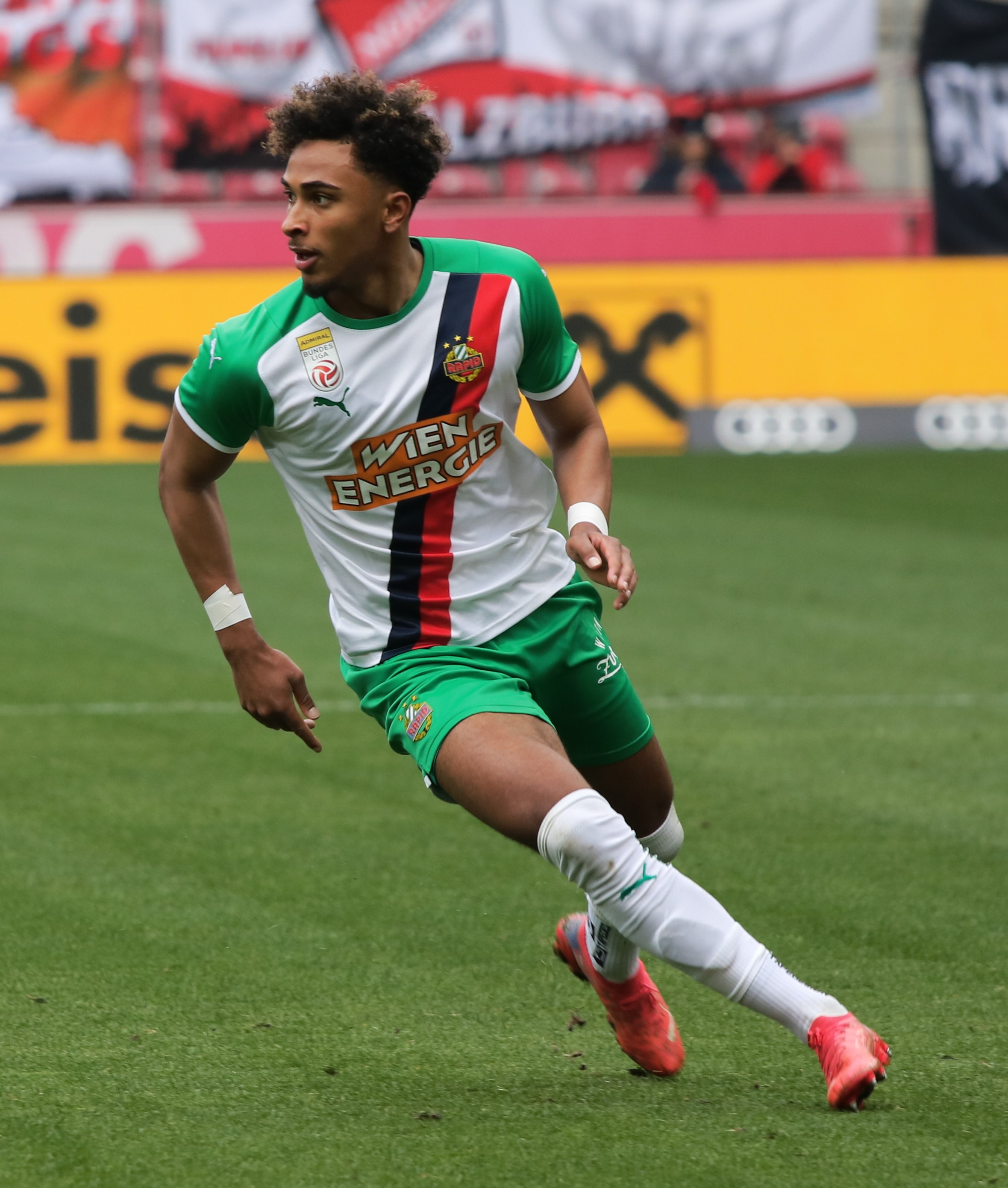
- Aiwu playing for Rapid Wien in 2022

Personal information
- Full name: Emanuel Aiwu
- Date of birth: 25 December 2000 (age 25)
- Place of birth: Innsbruck, Austria
- Height: 1.85 m (6 ft 1 in)
- Position: Defender

Team information
- Current team: Apollon Limassol
- Number: 4

Youth career
- 2006–2013: SKN St. Pölten
- 2013–2017: Admira Wacker

Senior career*
Years	Team	Apps	(Gls)
2017–2019	Admira Wacker II	20	(0)
2017–2021	Admira Wacker	81	(5)
2021–2022	Rapid Wien	23	(2)
2022–2024	Cremonese	23	(0)
2023–2024	→ Birmingham City (loan)	24	(0)
2024–2026	Sturm Graz	42	(1)
2026–	Apollon Limassol	0	(0)

International career
2018	Austria U18	2	(0)
2018	Austria U19	6	(1)
2019	Austria U20	2	(0)
2019–2022	Austria U21	13	(2)
- * Club domestic league appearances and goals as of 19:36, 26 April 2026 (UTC)

Emanuel Aiwu (born 25 December 2000) is an Austrian professional footballer who plays as a defender for Cypriot First Division club Apollon Limassol. He previously played Austrian Bundesliga football for Admira Wacker (2018–2021) and Rapid Wien (2021–2022) before joining Cremonese ahead of the 2022–23 Serie A season. He spent the 2023–24 season on loan at English Championship (second-tier) club Birmingham City. He has represented Austria from under-18 to under-21 levels.

== Early and personal life ==
Aiwu was born in Innsbruck, Austria, to a Nigerian father, Nathan Aiwu, and an Austrian mother, Heidi Semper, who began her training as a teacher of disabled people while Emanuel was still a baby. He has a younger brother, Elias. The family moved to St. Pölten in 2006, where the boys began to play football.

== Club career ==
Aiwu spent seven years with his hometown club, SKN St. Pölten, before joining Admira Wacker in 2013. He came through the youth system to make his senior debut while still a 16-year-old, starting and playing the whole game for Admira II in the Regional League East on 1 September 2017. He made 15 appearances for Admira II, contributed three goals from nine matches for Admira U18 as they went on to win the 2017–18 Jugendliga, found his way into the first-team squad and, towards the end of the season, started three Bundesliga matches, the first coming in a goalless draw away to Austria Wien on 5 May 2018.

The following season, Aiwu was a first-team regular, and in February 2020, reigning champions Red Bull Salzburg made an offer for his services. Although the fee received would have been a club record fee, in excess of the €2.5 million paid by VfB Stuttgart for Saša Kalajdžić, Admira turned it down, believing that Aiwu on the field was of more use to the relegation-threatened club than money in the bank. Admira stayed up Aiwu stayed on for a further season, taking his top-flight appearance totals to 81 matches and five goals.

With the 2021 transfer deadline approaching and speculation rife as to Aiwu's future, he told his coach that he was not fit to play in that day's match against Sturm Graz. Although he insisted that he had not wanted to harm the team by playing while mentally and physically exhausted, his action was widely perceived as a strike in order to force a move, and he and his family were victims of online abuse, some of a racist nature.

The following day, Aiwu joined another Bundesliga club, Rapid Wien, on a three-year contract. The fee was undisclosed. He made his debut on 15 September, starting in the home defeat against Genk in the Europa League group stage, and rarely missed a game thereafter. The club's sporting director, Zoran Barišić, said that Aiwu had gone to another level during the season, fulfilling all the expectations they had of him, and had behaved in a professional manner throughout.

On 5 August 2022, Aiwu joined Serie A club Cremonese, newly promoted to Serie A, on a four-year contract for a fee reported as €3.5 million. He played regularly for the first part of the season, but a mid-season change of management brought in a coach who preferred older, more experienced defenders, and although Aiwu was still a regular in the matchday squad, he rarely started. Cremonese were relegated, and it appeared that Aiwu saw his future at a higher level than Serie B.

Despite his adviser's mention of interest from top-five leagues, and reports of possible moves to Turkish Super Lig club Besiktas and to Burnley, newly returned to the Premier League, Aiwu signed for English Championship (second-tier) club Birmingham City on 31 August 2023 on loan for the season. The deal included an option to purchase. After a lengthy spell as an unused member of the matchday squad, Aiwu made his Birmingham debut on 3 October as a late substitute in a 4–1 win at home to Huddersfield Town.

== International career ==
Aiwu's first international appearance for Austria came at under-18 level in 2018. Called up for two friendlies against Ukraine, he was an unused substitute for the first match and started the second, a 3–0 win on 23 March. He made six appearances, scoring once, for Austria under-19s, and moved into the under-20s the following year. Aiwu was approached to represent Nigeria at the 2019 FIFA U-20 World Cup, but declined, preferring to continue within the Austrian system. Aiwu made his Austria under-21 debut in October 2019 in 2021 European Championship qualifier against Turkey, went on to make thirteen appearances, including seven in 2023 European qualifying, and captained the side.

== Career statistics ==
As of match played 26 April 2026

Appearances and goals by club, season and competition
Club	Season	League			National cup (Note: Includes Austrian Cup, Coppa Italia, FA Cup)		Continental		Other		Total	
Club	Season	Division	Apps	Goals	Apps	Goals	Apps	Goals	Apps	Goals	Apps	Goals
Admira Wacker II	2017–18	Austrian Regionalliga East	15	0	—		—		—		15	0
Admira Wacker II	2018–19	Austrian Regionalliga East	5	0	—		—		—		5	0
Admira Wacker II	Total		20	0	—		—		—		20	0
Admira Wacker	2017–18	Austrian Bundesliga	3	0	—		—		—		3	0
Admira Wacker	2018–19	Austrian Bundesliga	19	3	1	0	1 (Note: Appearance in UEFA Europa League)	0	—		21	3
Admira Wacker	2019–20	Austrian Bundesliga	26	0	2	0	—		—		28	0
Admira Wacker	2020–21	Austrian Bundesliga	28	1	1	0	—		—		29	1
Admira Wacker	2021–22	Austrian Bundesliga	5	1	1	0	—		—		6	1
Admira Wacker	Total		81	5	5	0	1	0	—		87	5
Rapid Wien	2021–22	Austrian Bundesliga	23	2	3	0	8 (Note: Six appearances in UEFA Europa League, two in UEFA Europa Conference League)	0	2 (Note: Appearances in Bundesliga UEFA Conference League play-offs)	0	36	2
Rapid Wien	2022–23	Austrian Bundesliga	0	0	1	0	2 (Note: Appearances in UEFA Europa Conference League)	0	—		3	0
Rapid Wien	Total		23	2	4	0	10	0	2	0	39	2
Cremonese	2022–23	Serie A	23	0	4	0	—		—		27	0
Cremonese	2023–24	Serie B	0	0	0	0	—		—		0	0
Cremonese	Total		23	0	4	0	—		—		27	0
Birmingham City (loan)	2023–24	Championship	24	0	1	0	—		—		25	0
Sturm Graz	2024–25	Austrian Bundesliga	27	1	3	0	6 (Note: Appearances in UEFA Champions League)	0	—		36	1
Sturm Graz	2025–26	Austrian Bundesliga	15	0	3	0	9 (Note: One appearance in UEFA Champions League, eight appearances in UEFA Europa League)	0	—		27	0
Sturm Graz	Total		42	1	6	0	15	0	—		63	2
Career total			213	8	20	0	26	0	2	0	261	8
