= 2023 UEFA European Under-21 Championship qualification Group I =

Football tournament qualification stage

Group I of the 2023 UEFA European Under-21 Championship qualifying competition consisted of five teams: Denmark, Belgium, Turkey, Scotland and Kazakhstan. The composition of the nine groups in the qualifying group stage was decided by the draw held on 28 January 2021, 12:00 CET (UTC+1), at the UEFA headquarters in Nyon, Switzerland, with the teams seeded according to their coefficient ranking.

== Standings ==
Pos	Team	Pld	W	D	L	GF	GA	GD	Pts	Qualification	Belgium	Denmark	Turkey	Scotland	Kazakhstan
1	Belgium	8	6	2	0	14	2	+12	20	Final tournament	—	1–0	2–0	0–0	2–0
2	Denmark	8	5	2	1	12	6	+6	17	Play-offs	1–1	—	3–2	1–1	3–0
3	Turkey	8	2	2	4	7	11	−4	8		0–3	1–2	—	1–1	0–0
4	Scotland	8	1	4	3	6	10	−4	7		0–2	0–1	0–2	—	2–1
5	Kazakhstan	8	0	2	6	4	14	−10	2		1–3	0–1	0–1	2–2	—

Source: UEFA
Rules for classification: Tiebreakers

== Matches ==
Times are CET/CEST, (Note: CEST (UTC+2) for dates between 31 March and 26 October 2021 and between 29 March and 24 October 2022, and CET (UTC+1) for all other dates.) as listed by UEFA (local times, if different, are in parentheses).

4 June 2021
15:00 (19:00 AQTT)

Kazakhstan	1–3	Belgium
Zhumabek 43'	Report	Sardella 28'; Onana 45+1'; Openda 75'

Koblandy Batyr Stadium, Aktobe
Attendance: 4,319
Referee: Kaarlo Oskari Hämäläinen (Finland)

3 September 2021
19:00 (20:00 TRT)

Turkey	0–3	Belgium
	Report	Openda 31', 81'; Vertessen 90+2'

Bursa Büyükşehir Stadium, Bursa
Attendance: 1,298
Referee: Ádám Farkas (Hungary)

7 September 2021
16:00 (21:00 ALMT)

Kazakhstan	0–1	Denmark
	Report	Bøving 78'

Astana Arena, Nur-Sultan
Attendance: 1,961
Referee: Dejan Jakimovksi (North Macedonia)
7 September 2021
18:30 (19:30 TRT)

Turkey	1–1	Scotland
Destan 75'	Report	Middleton 9'

Bursa Büyükşehir Stadium, Bursa
Attendance: 1,042
Referee: Igor Pajac (Croatia)

7 October 2021
20:05 (19:05 BST)

Scotland	0–1	Denmark
	Report	Isaksen 13'

Tynecastle Park, Edinburgh
Attendance: 1,473
Referee: Rade Obrenovič (Slovenia)

8 October 2021
20:00

Belgium	2–0	Kazakhstan
Openda 31' (pen.); Vertessen 84' (pen.)	Report

Den Dreef, Leuven
Attendance: 442
Referee: Walter Altmann (Austria)

12 October 2021
13:00 (18:00 ALMT)

Kazakhstan	0–1	Turkey
	Report	Destan 27'

Shakhter Stadium, Karaganda
Attendance: 1,246
Referee: Rohit Saggi (Norway)
12 October 2021
20:00

Belgium	1–0	Denmark
Openda 38'	Report

Den Dreef, Leuven
Attendance: 1,052
Referee: Athanasios Tzilos (Greece)

12 November 2021
20:00

Belgium	2–0	Turkey
Balikwisha 51'; Van Der Brempt 90+5' (pen.)	Report

Den Dreef, Leuven
Attendance: 1,605
Referee: Rob Harvey (Republic of Ireland)
12 November 2021
20:05 (19:05 GMT)

Scotland	2–1	Kazakhstan
Fiorini 28'; Middleton 56'	Report	Samorodov 71'

Tannadice Park, Dundee
Attendance: 1,221
Referee: Snir Levy (Israel)

16 November 2021
18:00 (20:00 TRT)

Turkey	1–2	Denmark
Bayrakdar 51'	Report	Lindstrøm 4' (pen.); Daramy 21'

Bahçeşehir Okulları Stadium, Alanya
Attendance: 108
Referee: Peter Bankes (England)
16 November 2021
20:05 (19:05 GMT)

Scotland	0–2	Belgium
	Report	Openda 40' (pen.); Raskin 87'

Tannadice Park, Dundee
Attendance: 2,304
Referee: Willy Delajod (France)

25 March 2022
20:05 (19:05 GMT)

Scotland	0–2	Turkey
	Report	Bayır 28'; K. Yılmaz 71'

Tynecastle Park, Edinburgh
Attendance: 2,068
Referee: Andrei Chivulete (Romania)

29 March 2022
13:00 (18:00 ALMT)

Kazakhstan	2–2	Scotland
Seydakhmet 71' (pen.); Zhumabek 83'	Report	Graham 25'; Clayton 58'

Almaty Central Stadium, Almaty
Attendance: 4,638
Referee: Dumitri Muntean (Moldova)
29 March 2022
20:00

Denmark	1–1	Belgium
Isaksen 37'	Report	Openda 53'

MCH Arena, Herning
Attendance: 1342
Referee: Urs Schnyder (Switzerland)

4 June 2022
15:00

Denmark	3–0	Kazakhstan
Isaksen 1'; Kjærgaard 25'; Grønbæk 90'	Report

Vejle Stadium, Vejle
Attendance: 1,339
Referee: Genc Nuza (Kosovo)

5 June 2022
16:00

Belgium	0–0	Scotland
	Report

Stayen, Sint-Truiden
Attendance: 1,248
Referee: Georgi Davidov (Bulgaria)

10 June 2022
18:00

Denmark	1–1	Scotland
Kjærgaard 70'	Report	Kelly 45+2'

Vejle Stadium, Vejle
Attendance: 2,151
Referee: Cesar Soto Grado (Spain)
10 June 2022
19:00 (20:00 TRT)

Turkey	0–0	Kazakhstan
	Report

Recep Tayyip Erdoğan Stadium, Istanbul
Attendance: 210
Referee: Kári Á Høvdanum (Faroe Islands)

14 June 2022
18:00

Denmark	3–2	Turkey
O'Riley 17'; Isaksen 66'; Kvistgaarden 76'	Report	B. A. Yılmaz 9'; Yıldırım 90+2'

Vejle Stadium, Vejle
Attendance: 3,157
Referee: Miguel Bertolo Nogueira (Portugal)

== Goalscorers ==
There were 43 goals scored in 20 matches, for an average of 2.15 goals per match.

7 goals

- (Belgium) Loïs Openda

4 goals

- (Denmark) Gustav Isaksen

2 goals

- (Belgium) Yorbe Vertessen
- (Denmark) Maurits Kjærgaard
- (Kazakhstan) Abylaikhan Zhumabek
- (Scotland) Glenn Middleton
- (Turkey) Enis Destan

1 goal

- (Belgium) Michel-Ange Balikwisha
- (Belgium) Amadou Onana
- (Belgium) Nicolas Raskin
- (Belgium) Killian Sardella
- (Belgium) Ignace Van Der Brempt
- (Denmark) William Bøving
- (Denmark) Mohamed Daramy
- (Denmark) Albert Grønbæk
- (Denmark) Mathias Kvistgaarden
- (Denmark) Jesper Lindstrøm
- (Denmark) Matt O'Riley
- (Kazakhstan) Maksim Samorodov
- (Kazakhstan) Yerkebulan Seydakhmet
- (Scotland) Tom Clayton
- (Scotland) Lewis Fiorini
- (Scotland) Ross Graham
- (Scotland) Stephen Kelly
- (Turkey) Furkan Bayır
- (Turkey) Gökdeniz Bayrakdar
- (Turkey) Bertuğ Yıldırım
- (Turkey) Barış Alper Yılmaz
- (Turkey) Kartal Yılmaz
