= 2023 UEFA European Under-21 Championship qualification Group E =

Football tournament qualification stage

Group E of the 2023 UEFA European Under-21 Championship qualifying competition consisted of six teams: Netherlands, Switzerland, Bulgaria, Wales, Moldova, and Gibraltar. The composition of the nine groups in the qualifying group stage was decided by the draw held on 28 January 2021, 12:00 CET (UTC+1), at the UEFA headquarters in Nyon, Switzerland, with the teams seeded according to their coefficient ranking.

== Standings ==
| Pos | Team | Pld | W | D | L | GF | GA | GD | Pts | Qualification | Netherlands | Switzerland | Moldova | Wales | Bulgaria | Gibraltar |
|---|---|---|---|---|---|---|---|---|---|---|---|---|---|---|---|---|
| 1 | Netherlands | 10 | 8 | 2 | 0 | 32 | 3 | +29 | 26 | Final tournament | — | 2–0 | 3–0 | 5–0 | 3–1 | 6–0 |
| 2 | Switzerland | 10 | 7 | 2 | 1 | 22 | 6 | +16 | 23 | Final tournament | 2–2 | — | 3–0 | 5–1 | 1–0 | 4–0 |
| 3 | Moldova | 10 | 3 | 3 | 4 | 7 | 12 | −5 | 12 | | 0–3 | 1–1 | — | 1–0 | 0–2 | 1–0 |
| 4 | Wales | 10 | 3 | 2 | 5 | 15 | 14 | +1 | 11 | | 0–1 | 0–1 | 0–0 | — | 1–1 | 2–0 |
| 5 | Bulgaria | 10 | 2 | 4 | 4 | 10 | 11 | −1 | 10 | | 0–0 | 0–1 | 0–0 | 0–4 | — | 5–0 |
| 6 | Gibraltar | 10 | 0 | 1 | 9 | 1 | 41 | −40 | 1 | | 0–7 | 0–4 | 0–4 | 0–7 | 1–1 | — |

Source: UEFA
Rules for classification: Tiebreakers

== Matches ==
Times are CET/CEST, (Note: CEST (UTC+2) for dates between 31 March and 26 October 2021 and between 29 March and 24 October 2022, and CET (UTC+1) for all other dates.) as listed by UEFA (local times, if different, are in parentheses).

4 June 2021
20:30 (19:30 BST)

| Wales | 0–0 | Moldova |
|---|---|---|
| | Report |

Stebonheath Park, Llanelli
Attendance: 0
Referee: Matthew De Gabriele (Malta)

3 September 2021
19:00 (20:00 EEST)

| Moldova | 0–2 | Bulgaria |
|---|---|---|
| | Report | Minchev 52'; Mitkov 75' |

Zimbru Stadium, Chișinău
Attendance: 350
Referee: Enea Jorgji (Albania)
3 September 2021
19:00

| Switzerland | 4–0 | Gibraltar |
|---|---|---|
| Jankewitz 4'; Kronig 25'; Mambimbi 36'; Amdouni 78' | Report |

Stade Tourbillon, Sion
Attendance: 750
Referee: Rauf Jabarov (Azerbaijan)

7 September 2021
17:30 (18:30 EEST)

| Bulgaria | 0–4 | Wales |
|---|---|---|
| | Report | Vale 27', 50', 73'; Sass-Davies 42' |

Stadion Slavia, Sofia
Attendance: 400
Referee: Visar Kastrati (Kosovo)
7 September 2021
18:00

| Gibraltar | 0–4 | Switzerland |
|---|---|---|
| | Report | Barès 24'; Mambimbi 44'; Amdouni 86', 90+4' |

Victoria Stadium, Gibraltar
Attendance: 311
Referee: Michal Ocenáš (Slovakia)
7 September 2021
18:45

| Netherlands | 3–0 | Moldova |
|---|---|---|
| Zirkzee 30'; Ekkelenkamp 45+1'; Brobbey 54' | Report |

De Adelaarshorst, Deventer
Attendance: 1,780
Referee: Emmanouil Skoulas (Greece)

8 October 2021
17:00 (18:00 EEST)

| Moldova | 1–0 | Wales |
|---|---|---|
| Ieşeanu 21' | Report |

CSR Orhei, Orhei
Attendance: 220
Referee: Milovan Milačić (Montenegro)
8 October 2021
17:30 (18:30 EEST)

| Bulgaria | 5–0 | Gibraltar |
|---|---|---|
| Vl. Nikolov 6', 25' (pen.), 26'; M. D. Petkov 35'; Stoyanov 63' | Report |

Stadion Slavia, Sofia
Attendance: 45
Referee: Aleksei Matyunin (Russia)
8 October 2021
19:00

| Switzerland | 2–2 | Netherlands |
|---|---|---|
| Okafor 28', 49' | Report | Zirkzee 62', 69' |

Stade de la Tuilière, Lausanne
Attendance: 7,057
Referee: Novak Simović (Serbia)

12 October 2021
17:00 (18:00 EEST)

| Bulgaria | 0–1 | Switzerland |
|---|---|---|
| | Report | Imeri 45' |

Stadion Slavia, Sofia
Attendance: 93
Referee: Lazar Lukić (Serbia)
12 October 2021
18:00 (19:00 EEST)

| Moldova | 1–0 | Gibraltar |
|---|---|---|
| Gliga 83' | Report |

Zimbru Stadium, Chișinău
Attendance: 123
Referee: Daniyar Sakhi (Kazakhstan)
12 October 2021
20:00

| Netherlands | 5–0 | Wales |
|---|---|---|
| Ekkelenkamp 7', 53'; Botman 35'; Stevens 48' (o.g.); Redan 50' | Report |

Goffertstadion, Nijmegen
Attendance: 3,082
Referee: Philip Farrugia (Malta)

12 November 2021
18:30

| Switzerland | 3–0 | Moldova |
|---|---|---|
| Amdouni 67'; Husic 76'; Rieder 86' | Report |

Stockhorn Arena, Thun
Attendance: 1,448
Referee: Jonathan Lardot (Belgium)
12 November 2021
18:45

| Netherlands | 3–1 | Bulgaria |
|---|---|---|
| Maatsen 38'; Zirkzee 46', 90' (pen.) | Report | Minchev 19' |

Yanmar Stadion, Almere
Attendance: 2,200
Referee: Sascha Stegemann (Germany)
12 November 2021
19:00

| Gibraltar | 0–7 | Wales |
|---|---|---|
| | Report | Beck 13'; Adams 16' (pen.), 51'; Jephcott 33'; Williams 71'; Taylor 84'; Astley 88' |

Victoria Stadium, Gibraltar
Attendance: 334
Referee: Marian Barbu (Romania)

15 November 2021
14:00

| Gibraltar | 0–7 | Netherlands |
|---|---|---|
| | Report | Summerville 16'; Hoever 20'; Brobbey 48'; Zirkzee 53', 56'; Ekkelenkamp 68'; Redan 81' |

Victoria Stadium, Gibraltar
Attendance: 550
Referee: Helgi Mikael Jónasson (Iceland)

16 November 2021
17:30 (18:30 EET)

| Bulgaria | 0–0 | Moldova |
|---|---|---|
| | Report |

Stadion Slavia, Sofia
Attendance: 42
Referee: Petri Viljanen (Finland)
16 November 2021
19:00 (18:00 GMT)

| Wales | 0–1 | Switzerland |
|---|---|---|
| | Report | Mambimbi 53' |

Rodney Parade, Newport
Attendance: 237
Referee: Manfredas Lukjancukas (Lithuania)

25 March 2022
18:45 (19:45 EET)

| Bulgaria | 0–0 | Netherlands |
|---|---|---|
| | Report |

Stadion Slavia, Sofia
Attendance: 332
Referee: Sandi Putros (Denmark)
25 March 2022
19:00

| Switzerland | 5–1 | Wales |
|---|---|---|
| Mambimbi 12'; Ndoye 15', 47'; Amdouni 20', 50' | Report | Adams 46' |

Stade de la Tuilière, Lausanne
Attendance: 6,618
Referee: Ferenc Karakó (Hungary)

29 March 2022
13:00

| Gibraltar | 0–4 | Moldova |
|---|---|---|
| | Report | Blănuță 21', 72'; Iovu 61'; Namolovan 63' |

Victoria Stadium, Gibraltar
Attendance: 1278
Referee: Vitālijs Spasjoņņikovs (Latvia)
29 March 2022
16:00 (15:00 BST)

| Wales | 1–1 | Bulgaria |
|---|---|---|
| Pearson 63' | Report | Vl. Nikolov 61' |

Rodney Parade, Newport
Attendance: 210
Referee: Pavel Orel (Czech Republic)
29 March 2022
18:45

| Netherlands | 2–0 | Switzerland |
|---|---|---|
| Tavşan 76', 78' | Report |

De Adelaarshorst, Deventer
Attendance: 4,200
Referee: Rohit Saggi (Norway)

3 June 2022
18:45 (19:45 EEST)

| Moldova | 0–3 | Netherlands |
|---|---|---|
| | Report | Timber 2'; Brobbey 17', 58' |

Zimbru Stadium, Chișinău
Attendance: 795
Referee: Juxhin Xhaja (Albania)

4 June 2022
19:00

| Switzerland | 1–0 | Bulgaria |
|---|---|---|
| Rieder 56' | Report |

Cornaredo Stadium, Lugano
Attendance: 1,125
Referee: Gustavo Fernandes Correia (Portugal)

7 June 2022
20:00

| Netherlands | 6–0 | Gibraltar |
|---|---|---|
| Van Kaam 46'; Redan 60'; Van den Berg 67'; Boadu 68'; Brobbey 74'; Tavşan 89' | Report |

Yanmar Stadion, Almere
Attendance: 1,750
Referee: Jan Machálek (Czech Republic)

8 June 2022
18:00 (19:00 EEST)

| Moldova | 1–1 | Switzerland |
|---|---|---|
| Blănuță 75' | Report | Imeri 5' (pen.) |

Zimbru Stadium, Chișinău
Attendance: 738
Referee: Kevin Clancy (Scotland)

11 June 2022
18:00 (17:00 BST)

| Wales | 0–1 | Netherlands |
|---|---|---|
| | Report | Geertruida 86' |

Parc y Scarlets, Llanelli
Attendance: 161
Referee: David Smajc (Slovenia)
11 June 2022
20:00

| Gibraltar | 1–1 | Bulgaria |
|---|---|---|
| Peacock 83' (pen.) | Report | Vl. Nikolov 57' |

Victoria Stadium, Gibraltar
Attendance: 480
Referee: Alessandro Dudic (Switzerland)

14 June 2022
14:00 (13:00 BST)

| Wales | 2–0 | Gibraltar |
|---|---|---|
| King 1'; Hammond 53' | Report |

Parc y Scarlets, Llanelli
Attendance: 250
Referee: Chrysovalantis Theouli (Cyprus)

== Goalscorers ==
There were 87 goals scored in 30 matches, for an average of 2.9 goals per match.

7 goals

- (Netherlands) Joshua Zirkzee

6 goals

- (Switzerland) Zeki Amdouni

5 goals

- (Bulgaria) Vladimir Nikolov
- (Netherlands) Brian Brobbey

4 goals

- (Netherlands) Jurgen Ekkelenkamp
- (Switzerland) Felix Mambimbi

3 goals

- (Moldova) Vladislav Blănuță
- (Netherlands) Daishawn Redan
- (Netherlands) Elayis Tavşan
- (Wales) Joe Adams
- (Wales) Jack Vale

2 goals

- (Bulgaria) Martin Minchev
- (Switzerland) Kastriot Imeri
- (Switzerland) Dan Ndoye
- (Switzerland) Noah Okafor
- (Switzerland) Fabian Rieder

1 goal

- (Bulgaria) Mitko Mitkov
- (Bulgaria) Martin Petkov
- (Bulgaria) Dimitar Stoyanov
- (Gibraltar) Dylan Peacock
- (Moldova) Eugeniu Gliga
- (Moldova) Dinis Ieşeanu
- (Moldova) Iurie Iovu
- (Moldova) Nicu Namolovan
- (Netherlands) Sepp van den Berg
- (Netherlands) Myron Boadu
- (Netherlands) Sven Botman
- (Netherlands) Lutsharel Geertruida
- (Netherlands) Ki-Jana Hoever
- (Netherlands) Daniël van Kaam
- (Netherlands) Ian Maatsen
- (Netherlands) Crysencio Summerville
- (Netherlands) Quinten Timber
- (Switzerland) Gabriel Barès
- (Switzerland) Anel Husic
- (Switzerland) Alex Jankewitz
- (Switzerland) Jan Kronig
- (Wales) Ryan Astley
- (Wales) Owen Beck
- (Wales) Oliver Hammond
- (Wales) Luke Jephcott
- (Wales) Eli King
- (Wales) Sam Pearson
- (Wales) Billy Sass-Davies
- (Wales) Terry Taylor
- (Wales) Daniel Williams

1 own goal

- (Wales) Fin Stevens (against Netherlands)
