= 2023 UEFA European Under-21 Championship qualification =

Tournament details
- Dates: 25 March 2021 – 27 September 2022
- Teams: 53 (from 1 confederation)

Tournament statistics
- Matches played: 255
- Goals scored: 778 (3.05 per match)
- Top scorer: (Portugal) Gonçalo Ramos (12 goals)

The 2023 UEFA European Under-21 Championship qualifying competition was a men's under-21 football competition to determine the 14 teams that would be joining the automatically qualified co-hosts Romania and Georgia in the 2023 UEFA European Under-21 Championship final tournament.

Apart from Romania and Georgia, all remaining 53 UEFA member national teams entered the qualifying competition. Players born on or after 1 January 2000 were eligible to participate.

== Format ==
The qualifying competition consisted of the following two rounds:

- Qualifying group stage: The 53 teams were drawn into nine groups: eight groups of six teams and one group of five teams. Each group was played in home-and-away round-robin format. The nine group winners and the best runner-up (not counting results against the sixth-placed team) qualified directly for the final tournament, while the remaining eight runners-up advanced to the play-offs.
- Play-offs: The eight teams were drawn into four ties to play home-and-away two-legged matches to determine the last four qualified teams.

=== Tiebreakers ===
In the qualifying group stage, teams were ranked according to points (3 points for a win, 1 point for a draw, 0 points for a loss), and if tied on points, the following tiebreaking criteria were applied, in the order given, to determine the rankings (Regulations Article 14.01):

1. Points in head-to-head matches among tied teams;
2. Goal difference in head-to-head matches among tied teams;
3. Goals scored in head-to-head matches among tied teams;
4. Away goals scored in head-to-head matches among tied teams;
5. If more than two teams were tied, and after applying all head-to-head criteria above, a subset of teams were still tied, all head-to-head criteria above were reapplied exclusively to this subset of teams;
6. Goal difference in all group matches;
7. Goals scored in all group matches;
8. Away goals scored in all group matches;
9. Wins in all group matches;
10. Away wins in all group matches;
11. Disciplinary points (red card = 3 points, yellow card = 1 point, expulsion for two yellow cards in one match = 3 points);
12. UEFA coefficient ranking for the qualifying group stage draw.

To determine the best runner-up from the qualifying group stage, the results against the teams in sixth place were discarded. The following criteria were applied (Regulations Article 15.02):

1. Points;
2. Goal difference;
3. Goals scored;
4. Away goals scored;
5. Wins;
6. Away wins;
7. Disciplinary points;
8. UEFA coefficient ranking for the qualifying group stage draw.

== Schedule ==
Stage	Draw date	FIFA International Dates
Qualifying group stage	28 January 2021	Matchday 1 (1–3 September 2021) (Note: Some matches of Matchday 1 were played on 25 and 29 March 2021 and some matches were played on 4–8 June 2021)
Qualifying group stage	28 January 2021	Matchday 2 (6–7 September 2021)
Qualifying group stage	28 January 2021	Matchday 3 (7–8 October 2021)
Qualifying group stage	28 January 2021	Matchday 4 (11–12 October 2021)
Qualifying group stage	28 January 2021	Matchday 5 (10–12 November 2021)
Qualifying group stage	28 January 2021	Matchday 6 (14–16 November 2021)
Qualifying group stage	28 January 2021	Matchday 7 (24–25 March 2022)
Qualifying group stage	28 January 2021	Matchday 8 (28–29 March 2022)
Qualifying group stage	28 January 2021	Matchday 9 (2–6 June 2022)
Qualifying group stage	28 January 2021	Matchday 10 (6–14 June 2022)
Play-offs	21 June 2022	1st leg (23 September 2022)
Play-offs	21 June 2022	2nd leg (27 September 2022)

== Qualifying group stage ==
=== Draw ===
Final tournament co-hosts
Team
Romania
Georgia

Pot A Team Spain Germany France England Italy Denmark Portugal Netherlands Croatia	Pot B Team Austria Poland Sweden Czech Republic Belgium Russia Serbia Switzerland Greece	Pot C Team Slovakia Iceland Ukraine Slovenia Republic of Ireland Israel Norway Bulgaria Turkey
Pot D Team Scotland North Macedonia Bosnia and Herzegovina Wales Northern Ireland Finland Hungary Belarus Albania	Pot E Team Montenegro Kosovo Lithuania Kazakhstan Moldova Cyprus Faroe Islands Azerbaijan Latvia	Pot F Team Luxembourg Armenia Malta Andorra Estonia Gibraltar Liechtenstein San Marino

Each group contained one team from each of Pots A–F (Pots A–E for a five-team group). Based on the decisions taken by the UEFA Emergency Panel, six pairs of teams would not be drawn in the same group.

- Armenia and Azerbaijan
- Gibraltar and Spain
- Bosnia and Herzegovina and Kosovo
- Kosovo and Serbia
- Kosovo and Russia
- Russia and Ukraine

=== Groups ===
==== Group A ====
Pos	Team	Pld	W	D	L	GF	GA	GD	Pts	Qualification	Norway	Croatia	Finland	Austria	Azerbaijan	Estonia
1	Norway	10	8	0	2	26	11	+15	24	Final tournament	—	3–2	3–1	3–1	2–1	3–0
2	Croatia	10	7	1	2	25	10	+15	22	Play-offs	3–2	—	2–3	0–0	2–0	2–0
3	Finland	10	6	1	3	18	13	+5	19		0–2	0–2	—	3–1	3–0	1–0
4	Austria	10	5	1	4	22	13	+9	16		2–1	1–3	2–3	—	6–0	2–0
5	Azerbaijan	10	2	1	7	12	24	−12	7		1–2	1–5	1–1	0–3	—	3–0
6	Estonia	10	0	0	10	0	32	−32	0		0–5	0–4	0–3	0–4	0–5	—

Source: UEFA

==== Group B ====
Pos	Team	Pld	W	D	L	GF	GA	GD	Pts	Qualification	Germany	Israel	Poland	Hungary	Latvia	San Marino
1	Germany	10	9	0	1	32	9	+23	27	Final tournament	—	3–2	0–4	4–0	4–0	4–0
2	Israel	10	6	1	3	19	10	+9	19	Play-offs	0–1	—	2–2	3–0	2–1	2–0
3	Poland	10	5	3	2	26	9	+17	18		1–2	1–2	—	1–1	5–0	3–0
4	Hungary	10	4	2	4	16	17	−1	14		1–5	1–2	2–2	—	1–0	4–0
5	Latvia	10	2	1	7	5	19	−14	7		1–3	1–0	0–2	0–2	—	2–0
6	San Marino	10	0	1	9	0	34	−34	1		0–6	0–4	0–5	0–4	0–0	—

Source: UEFA

==== Group C ====
On 28 February 2022, FIFA and UEFA announced that Russia was suspended from all competitions. On 2 May 2022, UEFA announced that Russia would no longer be allowed to take part in the competition, that their previous results were nullified, and that Group C would continue with five teams.

Pos	Team	Pld	W	D	L	GF	GA	GD	Pts	Qualification	Spain	Slovakia		Lithuania	Malta	Russia
1	Spain	8	8	0	0	37	5	+32	24	Final tournament	—	3–2	3–0	8–0	7–1	~~4–1~~
2	Slovakia	8	5	0	3	18	10	+8	15	Play-offs	2–3	—	2–1	3–1	4–0	Canc.
3	Northern Ireland	8	2	1	5	8	18	−10	7		0–6	1–0	—	4–0	0–2	Canc.
4	Lithuania	8	2	1	5	7	22	−15	7		0–2	0–2	1–1	—	2–1	~~0–3~~
5	Malta	8	2	0	6	10	25	−15	6		0–5	1–3	4–1	1–3	—	Canc.
6	Russia (Note: On 28 February 2022, FIFA and UEFA suspended Russian national teams from all competitions due to the Russian invasion of Ukraine. On 2 May 2022, UEFA expelled Russia and declared all of their results to be null and void.)	0	0	0	0	0	0	0	0	Disqualified	~~1–0~~	~~3–0~~	~~1–0~~	Canc.	~~6–0~~	—

Source: UEFA

==== Group D ====
Pos	Team	Pld	W	D	L	GF	GA	GD	Pts	Qualification	Portugal	Iceland	Greece	Belarus	Cyprus	Liechtenstein
1	Portugal	10	9	1	0	41	3	+38	28	Final tournament	—	1–1	2–1	1–0	6–0	11–0
2	Iceland	10	5	3	2	25	7	+18	18	Play-offs	0–1	—	1–1	3–1	5–0	9–0
3	Greece	10	5	2	3	16	10	+6	17		0–4	1–0	—	2–0	0–0	4–0
4	Belarus	10	4	0	6	16	15	+1	12		1–5	1–2	0–2	—	2–0	6–0
5	Cyprus	10	3	2	5	16	16	0	11		0–1	1–1	3–0	0–1	—	6–0
6	Liechtenstein	10	0	0	10	0	63	−63	0		0–9	0–3	0–5	0–4	0–6	—

Source: UEFA

==== Group E ====
Pos	Team	Pld	W	D	L	GF	GA	GD	Pts	Qualification	Netherlands	Switzerland	Moldova	Wales	Bulgaria	Gibraltar
1	Netherlands	10	8	2	0	32	3	+29	26	Final tournament	—	2–0	3–0	5–0	3–1	6–0
2	Switzerland	10	7	2	1	22	6	+16	23	Final tournament	2–2	—	3–0	5–1	1–0	4–0
3	Moldova	10	3	3	4	7	12	−5	12		0–3	1–1	—	1–0	0–2	1–0
4	Wales	10	3	2	5	15	14	+1	11		0–1	0–1	0–0	—	1–1	2–0
5	Bulgaria	10	2	4	4	10	11	−1	10		0–0	0–1	0–0	0–4	—	5–0
6	Gibraltar	10	0	1	9	1	41	−40	1		0–7	0–4	0–4	0–7	1–1	—

Source: UEFA

==== Group F ====
Pos	Team	Pld	W	D	L	GF	GA	GD	Pts	Qualification	Italy	Ireland	Sweden	Bosnia and Herzegovina	Montenegro	Luxembourg
1	Italy	10	7	3	0	19	5	+14	24	Final tournament	—	4–1	1–1	1–0	1–0	3–0
2	Republic of Ireland	10	6	1	3	16	10	+6	19	Play-offs	0–2	—	1–0	3–0	3–1	2–0
3	Sweden	10	5	3	2	22	8	+14	18		1–1	0–2	—	4–0	3–1	6–0
4	Bosnia and Herzegovina	10	3	2	5	9	16	−7	11		1–2	0–2	1–1	—	2–1	1–0
5	Montenegro	10	3	2	5	14	17	−3	11		1–1	2–1	1–3	2–2	—	3–0
6	Luxembourg	10	0	1	9	2	26	−24	1		0–3	1–1	0–3	0–2	1–2	—

Source: UEFA

==== Group G ====
Pos	Team	Pld	W	D	L	GF	GA	GD	Pts	Qualification	England	Czech Republic	Slovenia	Kosovo	Albania	Andorra
1	England	10	8	1	1	26	7	+19	25	Final tournament	—	3–1	1–2	2–0	3–0	4–1
2	Czech Republic	10	7	1	2	23	6	+17	22	Play-offs	1–2	—	1–0	3–0	4–0	7–0
3	Slovenia	10	4	4	2	11	7	+4	16		2–2	1–1	—	0–0	3–0	2–0
4	Kosovo	10	3	3	4	8	13	−5	12		0–5	0–1	0–0	—	2–1	2–0
5	Albania	10	3	1	6	9	17	−8	10		0–3	0–1	2–0	1–1	—	2–0
6	Andorra	10	0	0	10	1	28	−27	0		0–1	0–3	0–1	0–3	0–3	—

Source: UEFA

==== Group H ====
Pos	Team	Pld	W	D	L	GF	GA	GD	Pts	Qualification	France	Ukraine	Serbia	Faroe Islands	North Macedonia	Armenia
1	France	10	8	2	0	31	5	+26	26	Final tournament	—	5–0	2–0	2–0	3–0	7–0
2	Ukraine	10	7	2	1	20	11	+9	23	Play-offs	3–3	—	2–1	1–0	4–0	2–1
3	Serbia	10	3	3	4	10	11	−1	12		0–3	0–1	—	0–0	2–1	2–0
4	Faroe Islands	10	2	4	4	6	12	−6	10		1–1	0–4	1–1	—	1–1	2–0
5	North Macedonia	10	2	3	5	8	15	−7	9		0–1	1–1	0–0	0–1	—	3–1
6	Armenia	10	1	0	9	7	28	−21	3		1–4	0–2	1–4	2–0	1–2	—

Source: UEFA

==== Group I ====
Pos	Team	Pld	W	D	L	GF	GA	GD	Pts	Qualification	Belgium	Denmark	Turkey	Scotland	Kazakhstan
1	Belgium	8	6	2	0	14	2	+12	20	Final tournament	—	1–0	2–0	0–0	2–0
2	Denmark	8	5	2	1	12	6	+6	17	Play-offs	1–1	—	3–2	1–1	3–0
3	Turkey	8	2	2	4	7	11	−4	8		0–3	1–2	—	1–1	0–0
4	Scotland	8	1	4	3	6	10	−4	7		0–2	0–1	0–2	—	2–1
5	Kazakhstan	8	0	2	6	4	14	−10	2		1–3	0–1	0–1	2–2	—

Source: UEFA

=== Ranking of second-placed teams ===
Only the results of the second-placed teams against the first, third, fourth and fifth-placed teams in their group were taken into account, while results against the sixth-placed team in six-team groups were not included. As a result, eight matches played by each second-placed team were counted for the purposes of determining the ranking. The top-ranked team qualified directly for the final tournament, while the other teams entered the play-offs.

Pos	Grp	Team	Pld	W	D	L	GF	GA	GD	Pts	Qualification
1	E	Switzerland	8	5	2	1	14	6	+8	17	Final tournament
2	H	Ukraine	8	5	2	1	16	10	+6	17	Play-offs
3	I	Denmark	8	5	2	1	12	6	+6	17	Play-offs
4	A	Croatia	8	5	1	2	19	10	+9	16	Play-offs
5	G	Czech Republic	8	5	1	2	13	6	+7	16	Play-offs
6	C	Slovakia	8	5	0	3	18	10	+8	15	Play-offs
7	F	Republic of Ireland	8	5	0	3	13	9	+4	15	Play-offs
8	B	Israel	8	4	1	3	13	10	+3	13	Play-offs
9	D	Iceland	8	3	3	2	13	7	+6	12	Play-offs

Rules for classification: 1) points; 2) goal difference; 3) goals scored; 4) away goals scored; 5) wins; 6) away wins; 7) disciplinary points; 8) coefficient ranking.

=== Advanced teams ===
Advanced teams
Group	Group winners	Runners-up (Direct entrant)	Runners-up (Play-offs)
A	Norway		Croatia
B	Germany		Israel
C	Spain		Slovakia
D	Portugal		Iceland
E	Netherlands	Switzerland	
F	Italy		Republic of Ireland
G	England		Czech Republic
H	France		Ukraine
I	Belgium		Denmark

== Play-offs ==
The draw for the play-offs was held on 21 June 2022 in Nyon, Switzerland.

Team 1	Agg.	Team 2	1st leg	2nd leg
Croatia	3–3 (5–4 p)	Denmark	2–1	1–2 (a.e.t.)
Slovakia	3–5	Ukraine	3–2	0–3
Republic of Ireland	1–1 (1–3 p)	Israel	1–1	0–0 (a.e.t.)
Iceland	1–2	Czech Republic	1–2	0–0

== Qualified teams ==
The following teams qualified for the final tournament.

Note: All appearance statistics include only U-21 era (since 1978).

Team	Method of qualification	Date of qualification	Appearance	Last appearance	Previous best performance
Romania	Co-hosts	3 December 2020	4th	2021	Semi-finals (2019)
Georgia	Co-hosts	3 December 2020	1st	Debut	
Belgium	Group I winners	29 March 2022	4th	2019	Semi-finals (2007)
Spain	Group C winners	2 May 2022 (Note: On 2 May 2022, UEFA announced that Russia were removed from European Under-21 Championship qualification due to their country's invasion of Ukraine, with all their earlier results considered null and void. Spain therefore qualified for the European Under-21 Championship, as no other teams could surpass them.)	16th	2021	Champions (1986, 1998, 2011, 2013, 2019)
Germany	Group B winners	3 June 2022	14th	2021	Champions (2009, 2017, 2021)
Portugal	Group D winners	6 June 2022	10th	2021	Runners-up (1994, 2015, 2021)
England	Group G winners	7 June 2022	17th	2021	Champions (1982, 1984)
Netherlands	Group E winners	8 June 2022	9th	2021	Champions (2006, 2007)
France	Group H winners	9 June 2022	11th	2021	Champions (1988)
Italy	Group F winners	14 June 2022	22nd	2021	Champions (1992, 1994, 1996, 2000, 2004)
Norway	Group A winners	14 June 2022	3rd	2013	Semi-finals (1998, 2013)
Switzerland	Best runner-up	14 June 2022	5th	2021	Runners-up (2011)
Ukraine	Play-offs winner	27 September 2022	3rd	2011	Runners-up (2006)
Czech Republic	Play-offs winner	27 September 2022	9th	2021	Champions (2002)
Croatia	Play-offs winner	27 September 2022	5th	2021	Quarter-finals (2021)
Israel	Play-offs winner	27 September 2022	3rd	2013	Group stage (2007, 2013)

== Top goalscorers ==
There were 778 goals scored in 255 matches, for an average of 3.05 goals per match.

12 goals

- (Portugal) Gonçalo Ramos

7 goals

- (Austria) Junior Adamu
- (Austria) Romano Schmid
- (Belgium) Loïs Openda
- (Croatia) Roko Šimić
- (Germany) Jonathan Burkardt
- (Hungary) András Németh
- (Netherlands) Joshua Zirkzee
- (Portugal) Fábio Vieira
- (Spain) Abel Ruiz

6 goals

- (England) Folarin Balogun
- (Finland) Naatan Skyttä
- (Germany) Youssoufa Moukoko
- (Iceland) Kristian Hlynsson
- (Norway) Jørgen Strand Larsen
- (Portugal) Fábio Silva
- (Slovakia) Matej Trusa
- (Spain) Sergio Gómez
- (Sweden) Anthony Elanga
- (Switzerland) Zeki Amdouni

5 goals

- (Azerbaijan) Musa Gurbanlı
- (Bulgaria) Vladimir Nikolov
- (Croatia) Luka Sučić
- (France) Amine Gouiri
- (Netherlands) Brian Brobbey
- (Poland) Adrian Benedyczak

For full lists of goalscorers, see sections in each group:

- Group A
- Group B
- Group C
- Group D
- Group E
- Group F
- Group G
- Group H
- Group I
