= 2023 UEFA European Under-21 Championship qualification Group A =

Football tournament qualification stage

Group A of the 2023 UEFA European Under-21 Championship qualifying competition consisted of six teams: Croatia, Austria, Norway, Finland, Azerbaijan, and Estonia. The composition of the nine groups in the qualifying group stage was decided by the draw held on 28 January 2021, 12:00 CET (UTC+1), at the UEFA headquarters in Nyon, Switzerland, with the teams seeded according to their coefficient ranking.

== Standings ==
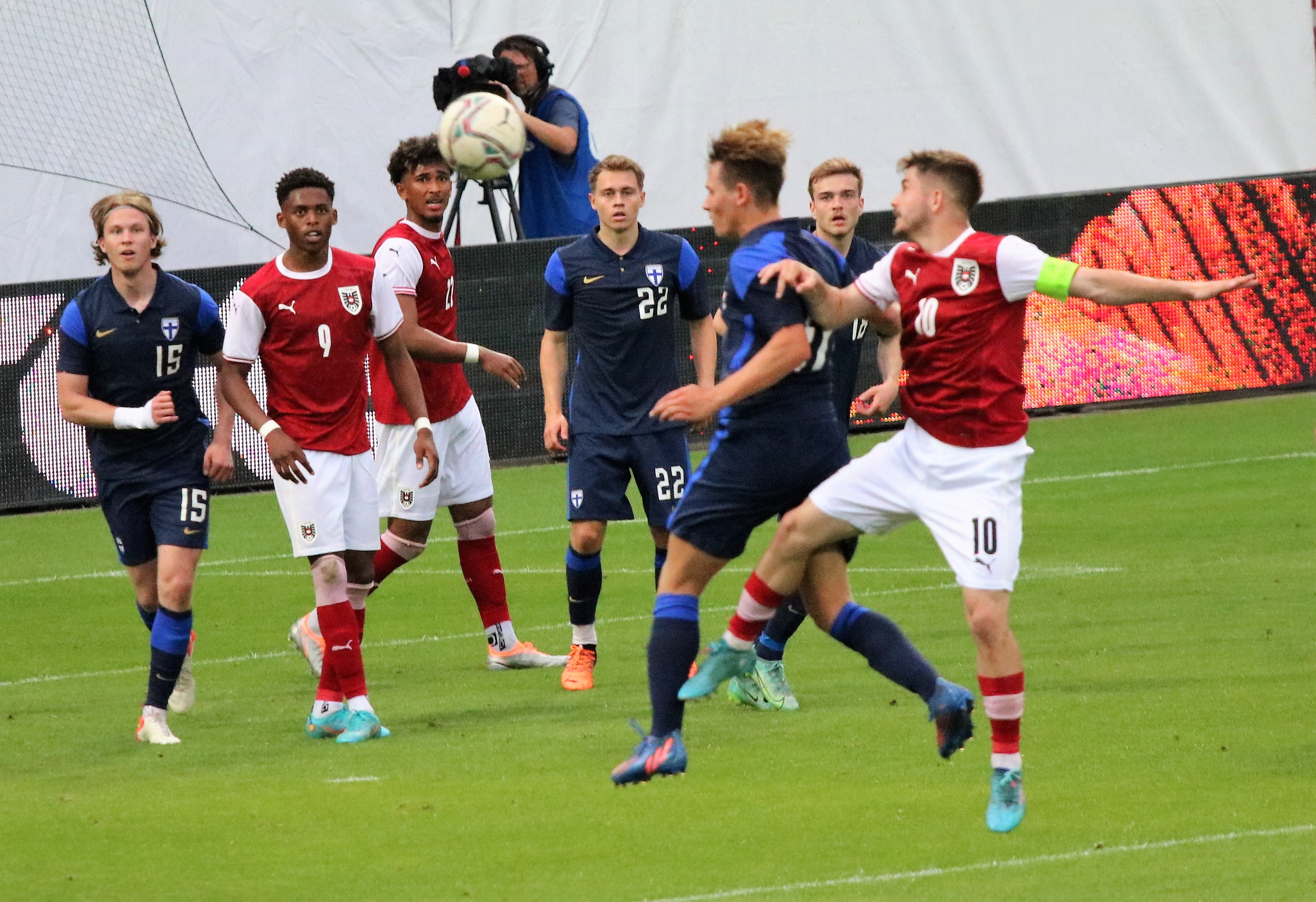
Austria against Finland (2022-06-03)

Pos	Team	Pld	W	D	L	GF	GA	GD	Pts	Qualification	Norway	Croatia	Finland	Austria	Azerbaijan	Estonia
1	Norway	10	8	0	2	26	11	+15	24	Final tournament	—	3–2	3–1	3–1	2–1	3–0
2	Croatia	10	7	1	2	25	10	+15	22	Play-offs	3–2	—	2–3	0–0	2–0	2–0
3	Finland	10	6	1	3	18	13	+5	19		0–2	0–2	—	3–1	3–0	1–0
4	Austria	10	5	1	4	22	13	+9	16		2–1	1–3	2–3	—	6–0	2–0
5	Azerbaijan	10	2	1	7	12	24	−12	7		1–2	1–5	1–1	0–3	—	3–0
6	Estonia	10	0	0	10	0	32	−32	0		0–5	0–4	0–3	0–4	0–5	—

Source: UEFA
Rules for classification: Tiebreakers

== Matches ==
Times are CET/CEST, (Note: CEST (UTC+2) for dates between 31 March and 26 October 2021 and between 29 March and 24 October 2022, and CET (UTC+1) for all other dates.) as listed by UEFA (local times, if different, are in parentheses).

8 June 2021
19:10

Austria	2–0	Estonia
Schmid 7'; Demir 56'	Report

Keine Sorgen Arena, Ried im Innkreis
Attendance: 1,080
Referee: Genc Nuza (Kosovo)

2 September 2021
19:00

Croatia	2–0	Azerbaijan
Sučić 10'; Šimić 24'	Report

Stadion Radnik, Velika Gorica
Attendance: 753
Referee: Denys Shurman (Ukraine)

3 September 2021
18:00 (19:00 EEST)

Estonia	0–3	Finland
	Report	Olusanya 29'; Sapp 49' (o.g.); Mömmö 75'

Pärnu Rannastaadion, Pärnu
Attendance: 300
Referee: Goga Kikacheishvili (Georgia)
3 September 2021
18:00

Norway	3–1	Austria
Larsen 17'; Holm 60'; Botheim 84'	Report	Adamu 13'

Marienlyst Stadion, Drammen
Attendance: 360
Referee: Matthew De Gabriele (Malta)

7 September 2021
17:00 (18:00 EEST)

Finland	0–2	Croatia
	Report	Sučić 73' (pen.); Ljubičić 87'

Raatti Stadium, Oulu
Attendance: 2,903
Referee: Vitor Ferreira (Portugal)
7 September 2021
18:00

Austria	6–0	Azerbaijan
Adamu 3', 40'; Aiwu 19'; Schmid 85'; Anselm 90', 90+3'	Report

Keine Sorgen Arena, Ried im Innkreis
Attendance: 950
Referee: Amin Kurgheli (Belarus)
7 September 2021
18:00 (19:00 EEST)

Estonia	0–5	Norway
	Report	Ceide 5', 8'; Holm 12'; Evjen 52'; Palumbo 90+2'

Pärnu Rannastaadion, Pärnu
Attendance: 63
Referee: Gergö Bogár (Hungary)

8 October 2021
18:00

Croatia	3–2	Norway
Šimić 2'; Sučić 16'; Vušković 57'	Report	Sebulonsen 55'; Ceide 58'

Stadion Varteks, Varaždin
Attendance: 718
Referee: Yaroslav Kozyk (Ukraine)
8 October 2021
18:30 (20:30 UTC+4)

Azerbaijan	1–1	Finland
Hüseynli 86'	Report	Agcabayov 75' (o.g.)

Kapital Bank Arena, Sumqayit
Attendance: 150
Referee: Viktor Shimusik (Belarus)
8 October 2021
19:00 (20:00 EEST)

Estonia	0–4	Austria
	Report	Prass 16'; Adamu 22' (pen.), 53'; Seiwald 65'

Pärnu Rannastaadion, Pärnu
Attendance: 153
Referee: Veaceslav Banari (Moldova)

12 October 2021
18:00

Norway	3–0	Estonia
Christensen 4'; Larsen 52'; Palumbo 73'	Report

Marienlyst Stadion, Drammen
Attendance: 228
Referee: Jason Barcelo (Gibraltar)
12 October 2021
18:30 (20:30 UTC+4)

Azerbaijan	1–5	Croatia
Gurbanlı 55' (pen.)	Report	Šimić 9', 13', 44' (pen.); Soldo 25'; Šutalo 81'

Kapital Bank Arena, Sumqayit
Attendance: 120
Referee: Ondřej Berka (Czech Republic)
12 October 2021
18:30 (19:30 EEST)

Finland	3–1	Austria
Skyttä 19', 58'; Antman 86'	Report	Greiml 68'

Tampere Stadium, Tampere
Attendance: 1,594
Referee: Zaven Hovhannisyan (Armenia)

11 November 2021
18:00

Croatia	2–0	Estonia
Šimić 39'; Pršir 62'	Report

Stadion Aldo Drosina, Pula
Attendance: 548
Referee: Ishmael Barbara (Malta)

12 November 2021
17:00 (20:00 UTC+4)

Azerbaijan	0–3	Austria
	Report	Aiwu 42'; Schmid 72' (pen.), 75'

Eighth Kilometer District Stadium, Baku
Attendance: 70
Referee: Miloš Milanović (Serbia)
12 November 2021
18:00

Norway	3–1	Finland
Larsen 55', 67' (pen.); Hove 89'	Report	Suhonen 74'

Marienlyst Stadion, Drammen
Attendance: 407
Referee: Mads-Kristoffer Kristoffersen (Denmark)

15 November 2021
17:30 (18:30 EET)

Finland	1–0	Estonia
Mömmö 31'	Report

Arto Tolsa Areena, Kotka
Attendance: 907
Referee: Georgi Davidov (Bulgaria)

16 November 2021
17:00 (20:00 UTC+4)

Azerbaijan	1–2	Norway
Zulfugarli 80'	Report	Hove 4'; Sahraoui 53'

Eighth Kilometer District Stadium, Baku
Attendance: 95
Referee: Vassilis Fotias (Greece)
16 November 2021
20:30

Austria	1–3	Croatia
Schmid 67'	Report	Kačavenda 14'; Franjić 41'; Sučić 55' (pen.)

Keine Sorgen Arena, Ried im Innkreis
Attendance: 1,300
Referee: Mohammed Al-Hakim (Sweden)

25 March 2022
16:00 (19:00 UTC+4)

Azerbaijan	3–0	Estonia
Gurbanlı 44', 66'; Khaibulaev 88'	Report

Kapital Bank Arena, Sumqayit
Attendance: 1,080
Referee: David Munro (Scotland)
25 March 2022
18:00

Croatia	0–0	Austria
	Report

Stadion Varteks, Varaždin
Attendance: 2,000
Referee: Manfredas Lukjancukas (Lithuania)

29 March 2022
18:00

Austria	2–1	Norway
Schmid 11'; Adamu 48'	Report	Holm 42'

Keine Sorgen Arena, Ried im Innkreis
Attendance: 1015
Referee: Morten Krogh (Denmark)
29 March 2022
20:00

Croatia	2–3	Finland
J. Šutalo 71'; Fruk 87'	Report	Skyttä 11', 29'; Ablade 45+3'

Stadion Varteks, Varaždin
Attendance: 1,200
Referee: Ádám Farkas (Hungary)

3 June 2022
18:00

Norway	3–2	Croatia
Botheim 37'; Daland 90+1'; Larsen 90+5'	Report	Sučić 5'; Šimić 79'

Marienlyst Stadion, Drammen
Attendance: 670
Referee: David Munro (Scotland)
3 June 2022
18:00 (19:00 EEST)

Estonia	0–5	Azerbaijan
	Report	Gurbanlı 3', 33'; R. Abdullazada 49' (pen.); Nuriyev 50'; Zulfugarli 84'

Pärnu Rannastaadion, Pärnu
Attendance: 174
Referee: Robert Ian Jenkins (Wales)
3 June 2022
18:00

Austria	2–3	Finland
Schmid 5' (pen.); Adamu 76'	Report	Håkans 67'; Skyttä 83'; Tauriainen 89' (pen.)

Keine Sorgen Arena, Ried im Innkreis
Attendance: 800
Referee: Adam Ladebäck (Sweden)

7 June 2022
15:00 (16:00 EEST)

Finland	3–0	Azerbaijan
Skyttä 50'; Antman 55'; Sadiku 79'	Report

Bolt Arena, Helsinki
Attendance: 1,043
Referee: Jasmin Sabotic (Luxembourg)

8 June 2022
18:00 (19:00 EEST)

Estonia	0–4	Croatia
	Report	Vidović 7'; Vušković 14'; Marin 41'; Fruk 55'

Pärnu Rannastaadion, Pärnu
Attendance: 262
Referee: Ashot Ghaltakhchyan (Armenia)

10 June 2022
17:00 (18:00 EEST)

Finland	0–2	Norway
	Report	Ceïde 63'; Oppegård 78'

Veritas Stadion, Turku
Attendance: 2,333
Referee: Abdulkadir Bitigen (Turkey)

14 June 2022
18:00

Norway	2–1	Azerbaijan
Larsen 54'; Botheim 77'	Report	Alekperov 65'

Marienlyst Stadion, Drammen
Attendance: 750
Referee: Luka Bilbija (Bosnia and Herzegovina)

== Goalscorers ==
There were 103 goals scored in 30 matches, for an average of 3.43 goals per match.

7 goals

- (Austria) Junior Adamu
- (Austria) Romano Schmid
- (Croatia) Roko Šimić

6 goals

- (Finland) Naatan Skyttä
- (Norway) Jørgen Strand Larsen

5 goals

- (Azerbaijan) Musa Gurbanlı
- (Croatia) Luka Sučić

4 goals

- (Norway) Emil Konradsen Ceide

3 goals

- (Norway) Erik Botheim
- (Norway) Noah Holm

2 goals

- (Austria) Emanuel Aiwu
- (Austria) Tobias Anselm
- (Azerbaijan) Ismayil Zulfugarli
- (Croatia) Toni Fruk
- (Croatia) Josip Šutalo
- (Croatia) Mario Vušković
- (Finland) Oliver Antman
- (Finland) Eetu Mömmö
- (Norway) Johan Hove
- (Norway) Martin Palumbo

1 goal

- (Austria) Yusuf Demir
- (Austria) Leo Greiml
- (Austria) Alexander Prass
- (Austria) Nicolas Seiwald
- (Azerbaijan) Rüfar Abdullazada
- (Azerbaijan) Ildar Alekperov
- (Azerbaijan) Abdulakh Khaibulaev
- (Azerbaijan) Ceyhun Nuriyev
- (Croatia) Bartol Franjić
- (Croatia) Lukas Kačavenda
- (Croatia) Marin Ljubičić
- (Croatia) Antonio Marin
- (Croatia) Jurica Pršir
- (Croatia) Nikola Soldo
- (Croatia) Gabriel Vidović
- (Finland) Terry Ablade
- (Finland) Daniel Håkans
- (Finland) Anthony Olusanya
- (Finland) Agon Sadiku
- (Finland) Anssi Suhonen
- (Finland) Julius Tauriainen
- (Norway) Tobias Christensen
- (Norway) Jesper Daland
- (Norway) Håkon Evjen
- (Norway) Fredrik Oppegard
- (Norway) Osame Sahraoui
- (Norway) Sebastian Sebulonsen

1 own goal

- (Azerbaijan) Arsen Agcabayov (against Finland)
- (Estonia) Mattias Sapp (against Finland)
- (Finland) Viljami Sinisalo (against Azerbaijan)
