= 2023 UEFA European Under-21 Championship =

Campionatul European de Fotbal Sub-21 2023 (in Romanian) 21-წლამდე ნაკრებთა ევროპის ჩემპიონატი (in Georgian)

Tournament details
- Host countries: Georgia; Romania
- Dates: 21 June – 8 July
- Teams: 16 (from 1 confederation)
- Venues: 8 (in 5 host cities)

Final positions
- Champions: England (3rd title)
- Runners-up: Spain

Tournament statistics
- Matches played: 31
- Goals scored: 72 (2.32 per match)
- Attendance: 319,082 (10,293 per match)
- Top scorer(s): (Spain) Sergio Gómez (Spain) Abel Ruiz (Ukraine) Heorhiy Sudakov (3 goals each)
- Best player: (England) Anthony Gordon

The 2023 UEFA European Under-21 Championship (also known as UEFA Under-21 Euro 2023) was the 24th edition of the UEFA European Under-21 Championship (27th edition if the Under-23 era is also included), the biennial international youth football championship organised by UEFA for the men's under-21 national teams of Europe. A total of 16 teams played in the final tournament, and only players born on or after 1 January 2000 were eligible to participate.

The tournament was co-hosted by Romania and Georgia. Romania hosted the opening match, while Georgia hosted the final. Romania already hosted the 1998 UEFA European Under-21 Championship.

As with previous Under-21 Championships held one year prior to the Olympic Games, this tournament served as European qualifying for the 2024 Summer Olympics. Besides France, which qualified automatically as Olympic hosts, eligible teams competed for qualifying (3 berths) for the men's football tournament of the 2024 Summer Olympics, where they will be represented by their under-23 national teams with a maximum of three overage players allowed.

Germany were the defending champion, but they were not able to defend their title after being eliminated in the group stage.

England won their third title by defeating Spain 1–0 in the final. They became the first team to win the UEFA European Under-21 Championship without conceding a single goal in the entire tournament.

== Host selection ==
- Ireland and Northern Ireland
- Georgia
- Romania

Both Romania and Georgia bid for the tournament separately. The two countries were appointed as co-hosts at the UEFA Executive Committee meeting on 3 December 2020.

== Qualification ==
=== Qualified teams ===
The following teams qualified for the final tournament.

Note: All appearance statistics include only U-21 era (since 1978).

Team	Method of qualification	Date of qualification	Appearance	Last appearance	Previous best performance
Romania	Co-hosts	3 December 2020	4th	2021	Semi-finals (2019)
Georgia	Co-hosts	3 December 2020	1st (4th incl. Soviet Union)	Debut	
Belgium	Group I winners	29 March 2022	4th	2019	Semi-finals (2007)
Spain	Group C winners	2 May 2022	16th	2021	Champions (1986, 1998, 2011, 2013, 2019)
Germany	Group B winners	3 June 2022	14th	2021	Champions (2009, 2017, 2021)
Portugal	Group D winners	6 June 2022	10th	2021	Runners-up (1994, 2015, 2021)
England	Group G winners	7 June 2022	17th	2021	Champions (1982, 1984)
Netherlands	Group E winners	8 June 2022	9th	2021	Champions (2006, 2007)
France	Group H winners	9 June 2022	11th	2021	Champions (1988)
Italy	Group F winners	14 June 2022	22nd	2021	Champions (1992, 1994, 1996, 2000, 2004)
Norway	Group A winners	14 June 2022	3rd	2013	Semi-finals (1998, 2013)
Switzerland	Group E runners-up	14 June 2022	5th	2021	Runners-up (2011)
Ukraine	Play-offs winner	27 September 2022	3rd (6th incl. Soviet Union)	2011	Runners-up (2006)
Czech Republic	Play-offs winner	27 September 2022	9th (15th incl. Czechoslovakia)	2021	Champions (2002)
Croatia	Play-offs winner	27 September 2022	5th (9th incl. Yugoslavia)	2021	Quarter-finals (2021)
Israel	Play-offs winner	27 September 2022	3rd	2013	Group stage (2007, 2013)

Notes

1. On 2 May 2022, UEFA announced that Russia were removed from European Under-21 Championship qualification, Spain therefore qualified for the European Under-21 Championship, as no other teams could surpass them.
2. The best runner-up among all nine groups qualified for the final tournament.

=== Final draw ===
The final draw was held on 18 October 2022, 18:00 CET in Bucharest. The sixteen teams were drawn into four groups of four teams. The teams were seeded according to their coefficient ranking following the end of the qualifying stage, calculated based on the following:

- 2019 UEFA European Under-21 Championship final tournament and qualifying competition (20%)
- 2021 UEFA European Under-21 Championship final tournament and qualifying competition (40%)
- 2023 UEFA European Under-21 Championship qualifying competition (group stage only) (40%)

The hosts Romania and Georgia were assigned to positions A1 and B1, respectively, while the remaining fourteen teams were drawn to the other available positions in their group.

Pot 1
Team	Coeff
Spain	41,837
Portugal	40,130
Germany	39,668
France	37,887

Pot 2
Team	Coeff
Netherlands	36,626
England	35,798
Italy	35,244
Romania (position B1)	32,414

Pot 3
Team	Coeff
Croatia	31,945
Switzerland	31,744
Belgium	31,550
Czech Republic	30,455

Pot 4
Team	Coeff
Ukraine	29,362
Norway	27,872
Israel	25,732
Georgia (position A1)	24,442

== Venues ==
=== Romania ===
The Federația Română de Fotbal originally proposed the following eight venues in Romania:

- Arena Națională, Bucharest
- Steaua Stadium, Bucharest
- Rapid-Giulești Stadium, Bucharest
- Arcul de Triumf Stadium, Bucharest
- Cluj Arena, Cluj-Napoca
- Dr. Constantin Rădulescu Stadium, Cluj-Napoca
- Ilie Oană Stadium, Ploiești
- Marin Anastasovici Stadium, Giurgiu

However, four stadiums were removed from the list of venues since Georgia was also appointed as host.

Bucharest	Venues in Romania	Bucharest
Steaua Stadium	Location of venues used in the 2023 UEFA European Under-21 Championship (Romania)	Rapid-Giulești Stadium
Capacity: 31,254	Location of venues used in the 2023 UEFA European Under-21 Championship (Romania)	Capacity: 14,047
Cluj-Napoca	Location of venues used in the 2023 UEFA European Under-21 Championship (Romania)	Cluj-Napoca
Cluj Arena	Location of venues used in the 2023 UEFA European Under-21 Championship (Romania)	Dr. Constantin Rădulescu Stadium
Capacity: 30,201	Location of venues used in the 2023 UEFA European Under-21 Championship (Romania)	Capacity: 22,198

=== Georgia ===
In Georgia, the tournament was also played at four stadiums. Initially these venues were proposed:

- Adjarabet Arena, Batumi
- Fazisi Stadium, Poti
- Boris Paichadze Dinamo Arena, Tbilisi
- Mikheil Meskhi Stadium, Tbilisi

Based on recommendation of the UEFA organizing group experts, in January 2022 Fazisi Stadium was replaced by Ramaz Shengelia Stadium located in Kutaisi.

Tbilisi	Venues in Georgia	Tbilisi
Boris Paichadze	Location of venues used in the 2023 UEFA European Under-21 Championship (Georgia)	Mikheil Meskhi
Capacity: 54,202	Location of venues used in the 2023 UEFA European Under-21 Championship (Georgia)	Capacity: 27,223
Batumi	Location of venues used in the 2023 UEFA European Under-21 Championship (Georgia)	Kutaisi
Adjarabet Arena	Location of venues used in the 2023 UEFA European Under-21 Championship (Georgia)	Ramaz Shengelia Stadium
Capacity: 20,000	Location of venues used in the 2023 UEFA European Under-21 Championship (Georgia)	Capacity: 14,700

== Match officials ==
Group A–C
Country	Referee	1st assistant referee	2nd assistant referee
Azerbaijan	Aliyar Aghayev	Zeynal Zeynalov	Akif Ämirälı
Croatia	Duje Strukan	Bojan Zobenica	Alen Jakšić
France	Willy Delajod	Erwan Christophe Finjean	Cyril Mugnier
Norway	Espen Eskås	Jan Erik Engan	Isaak Bashevkin
Romania	Horațiu Feşnic	Valentin Avram	Alexandru Cerei
Slovenia	Rade Obrenović	Jure Praprotnik	Grega Kordež

Group B–D
Country	Referee	1st assistant referee	2nd assistant referee
Belgium	Erik Lambrechts	Jo De Weirdt	Kevin Monteny
Denmark	Morten Krogh	Steffen Bramsen	Dennis Wollenberg Rasmussen
Lithuania	Donatas Rumšas	Aleksandr Radiuš	Dovydas Sužiedėlis
Netherlands	Allard Lindhout	Erwin E. J. Zeinstra	Rogier Honig
Portugal	João Pinheiro	Bruno Miguel Alves Jesus	Luciano António Gomes Maia
Sweden	Mohammed Al-Hakim	Fredrik Klyver	Robin Wilde

Fourth officials

Group A–C

- (Albania) Juxhin Xhaja
- (Georgia (country)) Goga Kikacheishvili

Group B–D

- (Romania) Andrei Chivulete
- (Austria) Sebastian Gishamer

== Squads ==
Each national team had to submit a squad of 23 players, three of whom had to be goalkeepers. If a player was injured or ill severely enough to prevent his participation in the tournament before his team's first match, he could be replaced by another player.

== Group stage ==
The group winners and runners-up advanced to the quarter-finals.

Tiebreakers

In the group stage, teams were ranked according to points (3 points for a win, 1 point for a draw, 0 points for a loss), and if tied on points, the following tiebreaking criteria were applied, in the order given, to determine the rankings (Regulations Articles 18.01 and 18.02):

1. Points in head-to-head matches among tied teams;
2. Goal difference in head-to-head matches among tied teams;
3. Goals scored in head-to-head matches among tied teams;
4. If more than two teams were tied, and after applying all head-to-head criteria above, a subset of teams were still tied, all head-to-head criteria above were reapplied exclusively to this subset of teams;
5. Goal difference in all group matches;
6. Goals scored in all group matches;
7. Penalty shoot-out if only two teams had the same number of points, and they met in the last round of the group and are tied after applying all criteria above (not used if more than two teams had the same number of points, or if their rankings were not relevant for qualification for the next stage);
8. Disciplinary points (red card = 3 points, yellow card = 1 point, expulsion for two yellow cards in one match = 3 points);
9. UEFA coefficient ranking for the final draw.

All times are local, EEST (UTC+3) in Romania and GET (UTC+4) in Georgia.

=== Group A ===
Pos	Team	Pld	W	D	L	GF	GA	GD	Pts	Qualification
1	Georgia (H)	3	1	2	0	5	3	+2	5	Advance to knockout stage
2	Portugal	3	1	1	1	3	4	−1	4	Advance to knockout stage
3	Netherlands	3	0	3	0	2	2	0	3	
4	Belgium	3	0	2	1	3	4	−1	2	

Source: UEFA
Rules for classification: Tiebreakers
(H) Hosts
21 June 2023
20:00

Georgia	2–0	Portugal
Gagua 37'; Sazonov 45'	Report

Boris Paichadze Stadium, Tbilisi
Attendance: 24,447
Referee: Espen Eskås (Norway)
21 June 2023
20:00

Belgium	0–0	Netherlands
	Report

Mikheil Meskhi Stadium, Tbilisi
Attendance: 1,029
Referee: Aliyar Aghayev (Azerbaijan)

24 June 2023
20:00

Georgia	2–2	Belgium
Tsitaishvili 51'; Guliashvili 87'	Report	De Cuyper 15'; Ramazani 38'

Boris Paichadze Stadium, Tbilisi
Attendance: 41,886
Referee: Duje Strukan (Croatia)
24 June 2023
20:00

Portugal	1–1	Netherlands
Almeida 20'	Report	Brobbey 78'

Mikheil Meskhi Stadium, Tbilisi
Attendance: 1,526
Referee: Horațiu Feşnic (Romania)

27 June 2023
20:00

Netherlands	1–1	Georgia
Taylor 45+6'	Report	Davitashvili 42'

Boris Paichadze Stadium, Tbilisi
Attendance: 43,004
Referee: Rade Obrenović (Slovenia)
27 June 2023
20:00

Portugal	2–1	Belgium
Neves 56'; Dantas 89' (pen.)	Report	Vertessen 65'

Mikheil Meskhi Stadium, Tbilisi
Attendance: 1,373
Referee: Willy Delajod (France)

=== Group B ===
Pos	Team	Pld	W	D	L	GF	GA	GD	Pts	Qualification
1	Spain	3	2	1	0	6	2	+4	7	Advance to knockout stage
2	Ukraine	3	2	1	0	5	2	+3	7	Advance to knockout stage
3	Croatia	3	0	1	2	0	3	−3	1	
4	Romania (H)	3	0	1	2	0	4	−4	1	

Source: UEFA
Rules for classification: Tiebreakers
(H) Hosts
21 June 2023
19:00

Ukraine	2–0	Croatia
Kashchuk 19'; Sikan 48'	Report

Stadionul Rapid-Giulești, Bucharest
Attendance: 1,677
Referee: Mohammed Al-Hakim (Sweden)
21 June 2023
21:45

Romania	0–3	Spain
	Report	Baena 55'; Miranda 62'; S. Gómez 90+5'

Stadionul Steaua, Bucharest
Attendance: 21,227
Referee: Erik Lambrechts (Belgium)

24 June 2023
19:00

Romania	0–1	Ukraine
	Report	Dican 89' (o.g.)

Stadionul Steaua, Bucharest
Attendance: 14,309
Referee: Morten Krogh (Denmark)
24 June 2023
21:45

Spain	1–0	Croatia
Ruiz 1'	Report

Stadionul Rapid-Giulești, Bucharest
Attendance: 2,921
Referee: Allard Lindhout (Netherlands)

27 June 2023
21:45

Croatia	0–0	Romania
	Report

Stadionul Steaua, Bucharest
Attendance: 7,816
Referee: João Pinheiro (Portugal)
27 June 2023
21:45

Spain	2–2	Ukraine
Zhelizko 49' (o.g.); Ruiz 90'	Report	Vyunnyk 43'; Sudakov 81' (pen.)

Stadionul Rapid-Giulești, Bucharest
Attendance: 2,027
Referee: Donatas Rumšas (Lithuania)

=== Group C ===
Pos	Team	Pld	W	D	L	GF	GA	GD	Pts	Qualification
1	England	3	3	0	0	6	0	+6	9	Advance to knockout stage
2	Israel	3	1	1	1	2	3	−1	4	Advance to knockout stage
3	Czech Republic	3	1	0	2	2	4	−2	3	
4	Germany	3	0	1	2	2	5	−3	1	

Source: UEFA
Rules for classification: Tiebreakers
22 June 2023
20:00

Czech Republic	0–2	England
	Report	Ramsey 47'; Smith Rowe 90+4'

Adjarabet Arena, Batumi
Attendance: 8,168
Referee: Horațiu Feşnic (Romania)
22 June 2023
20:00

Germany	1–1	Israel
Bisseck 26'	Report	Turgeman 20'

Ramaz Shengelia Stadium, Kutaisi
Attendance: 2,442
Referee: Willy Delajod (France)

25 June 2023
20:00

Czech Republic	2–1	Germany
Sejk 33'; Vitík 87'	Report	Stiller 70'

Adjarabet Arena, Batumi
Attendance: 5,023
Referee: Espen Eskås (Norway)
25 June 2023
20:00

England	2–0	Israel
Gordon 15'; Smith Rowe 68'	Report

Ramaz Shengelia Stadium, Kutaisi
Attendance: 5,106
Referee: Rade Obrenović (Slovenia)

28 June 2023
20:00

Israel	1–0	Czech Republic
Gandelman 82'	Report

Ramaz Shengelia Stadium, Kutaisi
Attendance: 2,175
Referee: Duje Strukan (Croatia)
28 June 2023
20:00

England	2–0	Germany
Archer 4'; Elliott 21'	Report

Adjarabet Arena, Batumi
Attendance: 9,587
Referee: Aliyar Aghayev (Azerbaijan)

=== Group D ===
Pos	Team	Pld	W	D	L	GF	GA	GD	Pts	Qualification
1	France	3	3	0	0	7	2	+5	9	Advance to knockout stage
2	Switzerland	3	1	0	2	5	8	−3	3 (Note: Tied on head-to-head points (3) and head-to-head goal difference (0). Head-to-head goals scored: Switzerland 4, Italy 3, Norway 2.)	Advance to knockout stage
3	Italy	3	1	0	2	4	5	−1	3	
4	Norway	3	1	0	2	2	3	−1	3	

Source: UEFA
Rules for classification: Tiebreakers
Notes:
22 June 2023
19:00

Norway	1–2	Switzerland
K. Ceide 19'	Report	Ndoye 36'; Imeri 56'

Stadionul Dr. Constantin Rădulescu, Cluj-Napoca
Attendance: 1,279
Referee: João Pinheiro (Portugal)
22 June 2023
21:45

France	2–1	Italy
Kalimuendo 22'; Barcola 62'	Report	Pellegri 36'

Cluj Arena, Cluj-Napoca
Attendance: 11,286
Referee: Allard Lindhout (Netherlands)

25 June 2023
19:00

Switzerland	2–3	Italy
Imeri 47'; Amdouni 52'	Report	Pirola 6'; Gnonto 11'; Parisi 45+4'

Cluj Arena, Cluj-Napoca
Attendance: 4,339
Referee: Mohammed Al-Hakim (Sweden)
25 June 2023
21:45

Norway	0–1	France
	Report	Olise 57'

Stadionul Dr. Constantin Rădulescu, Cluj-Napoca
Attendance: 1,507
Referee: Donatas Rumšas (Lithuania)

28 June 2023
21:45

Italy	0–1	Norway
	Report	Botheim 65'

Cluj Arena, Cluj-Napoca
Attendance: 2,347
Referee: Erik Lambrechts (Belgium)
28 June 2023
21:45

Switzerland	1–4	France
Ndoye 35'	Report	Gouiri 16' (pen.); Barcola 65'; Cherki 76'; Caqueret 81'

Stadionul Dr. Constantin Rădulescu, Cluj-Napoca
Attendance: 1,652
Referee: Morten Krogh (Denmark)

== Knockout stage ==
In the knockout stage, extra time and a penalty shoot-out were used to decide the winners if necessary. As France qualified as hosts and England were ineligible for the 2024 Summer Olympics, their results were used to determine whether an Olympic play-off match would be required and who would participate.

=== Bracket ===
Quarter-finals
1 July – Boris Paichadze Stadium
Georgia	0 (3)
Israel (p)	0 (4)
2 July – Ramaz Shengelia Stadium
England	1
Portugal	0
1 July – Stadionul Rapid-Giulești
Spain (a.e.t.)	2
Switzerland	1
2 July – Cluj Arena
France	1
Ukraine	3

Semi-finals
5 July – Adjarabet Arena
Israel	0
England	3
5 July – Stadionul Steaua
Spain	5
Ukraine	1

Final
8 July – Adjarabet Arena
England	1
Spain	0

=== Quarter-finals ===
1 July 2023
20:00

Georgia	0–0 (a.e.t.)	Israel
	Report
Penalties
Azarovi (penalty scored); Davitashvili (penalty scored); Gagua (penalty missed); Moistsrapishvili (penalty scored); Khvadagiani (penalty missed)	3–4	(penalty scored) Cohen; (penalty scored) Gandelman; (penalty scored) Khalaily; (penalty scored) Gloukh

Boris Paichadze Stadium, Tbilisi
Attendance: 44,338
Referee: Espen Eskås (Norway)

1 July 2023
22:00

Spain	2–1 (a.e.t.)	Switzerland
S. Gómez 68'; Miranda 103'	Report	Amdouni 90+1'

Stadionul Rapid-Giulești, Bucharest
Attendance: 3,861
Referee: Erik Lambrechts (Belgium)

2 July 2023
20:00

England	1–0	Portugal
Gordon 34'	Report

Ramaz Shengelia Stadium, Kutaisi
Attendance: 6,920
Referee: Rade Obrenović (Slovenia)

2 July 2023
22:00

France	1–3	Ukraine
Cherki 19'	Report	Sudakov 32' (pen.), 44'; Bondarenko 86'

Cluj Arena, Cluj-Napoca
Attendance: 6,281
Referee: João Pinheiro (Portugal)

=== Semi-finals ===
As England is not an IOC member and France did not reach the semi-finals, all other semi-finalists qualified for the 2024 Summer Olympics regardless of results.

5 July 2023
20:00

Israel	0–3	England
	Report	Gibbs-White 42'; Palmer 63'; Archer 90'

Adjarabet Arena, Batumi
Attendance: 11,801
Referee: Morten Krogh (Denmark)

5 July 2023
22:00

Spain	5–1	Ukraine
Ruiz 17'; Sancet 24'; Blanco 54'; Oroz 68'; S. Gómez 78'	Report	Bondarenko 13'

Stadionul Steaua, Bucharest
Attendance: 9,230
Referee: Erik Lambrechts (Belgium)

=== Final ===
8 July 2023
20:00

England	1–0	Spain
Jones 45+4'	Report

Adjarabet Arena, Batumi
Attendance: 18,498
Referee: Espen Eskås (Norway)

== Goalscorers ==
There were 72 goals scored in 31 matches, for an average of 2.32 goals per match.

3 goals

- (Spain) Sergio Gómez
- (Spain) Abel Ruiz
- (Ukraine) Heorhiy Sudakov

2 goals

- (England) Cameron Archer
- (England) Anthony Gordon
- (England) Emile Smith Rowe
- (France) Bradley Barcola
- (France) Rayan Cherki
- (Spain) Juan Miranda
- (Switzerland) Zeki Amdouni
- (Switzerland) Kastriot Imeri
- (Switzerland) Dan Ndoye
- (Ukraine) Artem Bondarenko

1 goal

- (Belgium) Maxim De Cuyper
- (Belgium) Largie Ramazani
- (Belgium) Yorbe Vertessen
- (Czech Republic) Václav Sejk
- (Czech Republic) Martin Vitík
- (England) Harvey Elliott
- (England) Morgan Gibbs-White
- (England) Curtis Jones
- (England) Cole Palmer
- (England) Jacob Ramsey
- (France) Maxence Caqueret
- (France) Amine Gouiri
- (France) Arnaud Kalimuendo
- (France) Michael Olise
- (Georgia (country)) Zuriko Davitashvili
- (Georgia (country)) Giorgi Gagua
- (Georgia (country)) Giorgi Guliashvili
- (Georgia (country)) Saba Sazonov
- (Georgia (country)) Heorhiy Tsitaishvili
- (Germany) Yann Aurel Bisseck
- (Germany) Angelo Stiller
- (Israel) Omri Gandelman
- (Israel) Dor Turgeman
- (Italy) Wilfried Gnonto
- (Italy) Fabiano Parisi
- (Italy) Pietro Pellegri
- (Italy) Lorenzo Pirola
- (Netherlands) Brian Brobbey
- (Netherlands) Kenneth Taylor
- (Norway) Erik Botheim
- (Norway) Emil Konradsen Ceide
- (Portugal) André Almeida
- (Portugal) Tiago Dantas
- (Portugal) João Neves
- (Spain) Álex Baena
- (Spain) Antonio Blanco
- (Spain) Aimar Oroz
- (Spain) Oihan Sancet
- (Ukraine) Oleksiy Kashchuk
- (Ukraine) Danylo Sikan
- (Ukraine) Bohdan Vyunnyk

1 own goal

- (Romania) Victor Dican (against Ukraine)
- (Ukraine) Ivan Zhelizko (against Spain)

== Awards ==
The following awards were given at the conclusion of the tournament:

- Player of the Tournament: (England) Anthony Gordon
- Top Scorer: (Spain) Sergio Gómez / (Spain) Abel Ruiz / (Ukraine) Heorhiy Sudakov (3 goals each)

=== Team of the tournament ===
After the tournament the Under-21 Team of the Tournament was selected by the UEFA Technical Observers.

Position	Player
Goalkeeper	(England) James Trafford
Defenders	(Spain) Juan Miranda
Defenders	(England) Levi Colwill
Defenders	(England) Taylor Harwood-Bellis
Defenders	(England) James Garner
Midfielders	(Spain) Rodri
Midfielders	(Spain) Antonio Blanco
Midfielders	(England) Curtis Jones
Midfielders	(Spain) Sergio Gómez
Forwards	(Spain) Abel Ruiz
Forwards	(England) Anthony Gordon

== Qualified teams for the 2024 Summer Olympics ==
The following four teams from UEFA qualified for the 2024 Summer Olympic men's football tournament, including France, who qualified as the hosts.

Team	Qualified as	Qualified on	Previous appearances in Summer Olympics^{1}
France	Hosts	13 September 2017	13 (1900, 1908, 1920, 1924, 1928, 1948, 1952, 1960, 1968, 1976, **1984**, 1996, 2020)
Israel	Semi-finalist	2 July 2023	2 (1968, 1976)
Spain	Runners-up	2 July 2023	11 (1920, 1924, 1928, 1968, 1976, 1980, **1992**, 1996, 2000, 2012, 2020)
Ukraine	Semi-finalist	2 July 2023	0 (debut)

^{1} Bold indicates champions for that year. Italic indicates hosts for that year.
