= Carl Gustafsson (footballer) =

Swedish footballer

Personal information
- Full name: Carl Ivar Gustafsson
- Date of birth: 18 March 2000 (age 26)
- Place of birth: Sweden
- Position: Midfielder

Team information
- Current team: Kalmar FF
- Number: 17

Youth career
- IFK Berga
- –2019: Kalmar FF

Senior career*
Years	Team	Apps	(Gls)
2019–	Kalmar FF	99	(4)

International career^{‡}
2016	Sweden U17	3	(0)
2019	Sweden U19	2	(0)
2021–2022	Sweden U21	11	(1)
2023	Sweden	2	(0)
- * Club domestic league appearances and goals as of 8 July 2026 ‡ National team caps and goals as of 22:08, 13 January 2023 (UTC)

Carl Ivar Gustafsson (born 18 March 2000) is a Swedish footballer who plays as a midfielder for Kalmar FF.

== Career ==
Gustafsson made his full international debut for Sweden on 9 January 2023, replacing Samuel Gustafson 82 minutes into a friendly 2–0 win against Finland.

== Career statistics ==
=== International ===
Appearances and goals by national team and year
National team	Year	Apps	Goals
Sweden	2023	2	0
Total		2	0
