= Luka Sučić =

Croatian footballer (born 2002)

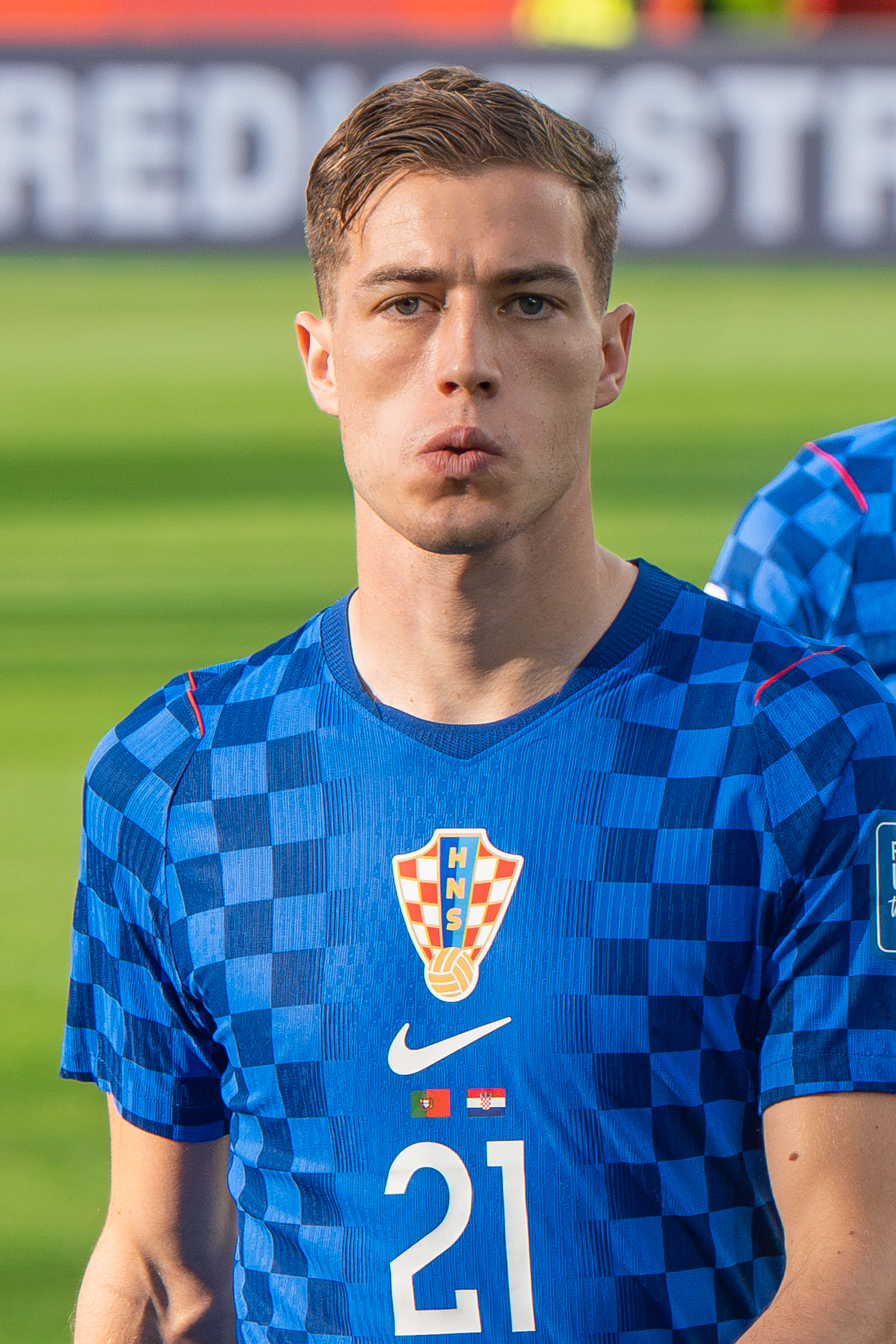
- Sučić with Croatia in 2026

Personal information
- Full name: Luka Sučić
- Date of birth: 8 September 2002 (age 24)
- Place of birth: Linz, Austria
- Height: 1.85 m (6 ft 1 in)
- Position: Midfielder

Team information
- Current team: Real Sociedad
- Number: 24

Youth career
- 2009–2012: SV Alkoven
- 2012–2016: Union Edelweiß Linz
- 2016–2019: Red Bull Salzburg

Senior career*
Years	Team	Apps	(Gls)
2019–2020	FC Liefering	26	(6)
2020–2024	Red Bull Salzburg	82	(12)
2024–	Real Sociedad	63	(8)

International career^{‡}
2017	Croatia U15	5	(1)
2018	Croatia U16	1	(0)
2018–2019	Croatia U17	8	(4)
2019	Croatia U19	3	(0)
2021–2024	Croatia U21	9	(5)
2021–	Croatia	23	(1)
Medal record
Men's football
Representing Croatia
FIFA World Cup
Third place	2022 Qatar
- * Club domestic league appearances and goals as of 22 November 2026 ‡ National team caps and goals as of 27 September 2026

Luka Sučić (Croatian pronunciation: [lûːka sûtʃitɕ]; born 8 September 2002) is a professional footballer who plays as a midfielder for La Liga club Real Sociedad. Born in Austria, he plays for the Croatia national team.

== Club career ==
=== Red Bull Salzburg ===
On 15 July 2020, Sučić signed a new contract with Red Bull Salzburg, until the summer of 2024.

He made his Bundesliga debut for Salzburg on 13 September 2020 in a game against Wolfsberg. On 25 November 2020, he made his Champions League debut, replacing Dominik Szoboszlai in 71st minute and providing Rasmus Kristensen with a pre-assist for Mërgim Berisha's goal, as Salzburg lost 3–1 to Bayern Munich. On 10 February 2021, Sučić scored his debut Bundesliga goal in a 3–1 victory over Austria Wien, coming off the bench to replace Berisha.

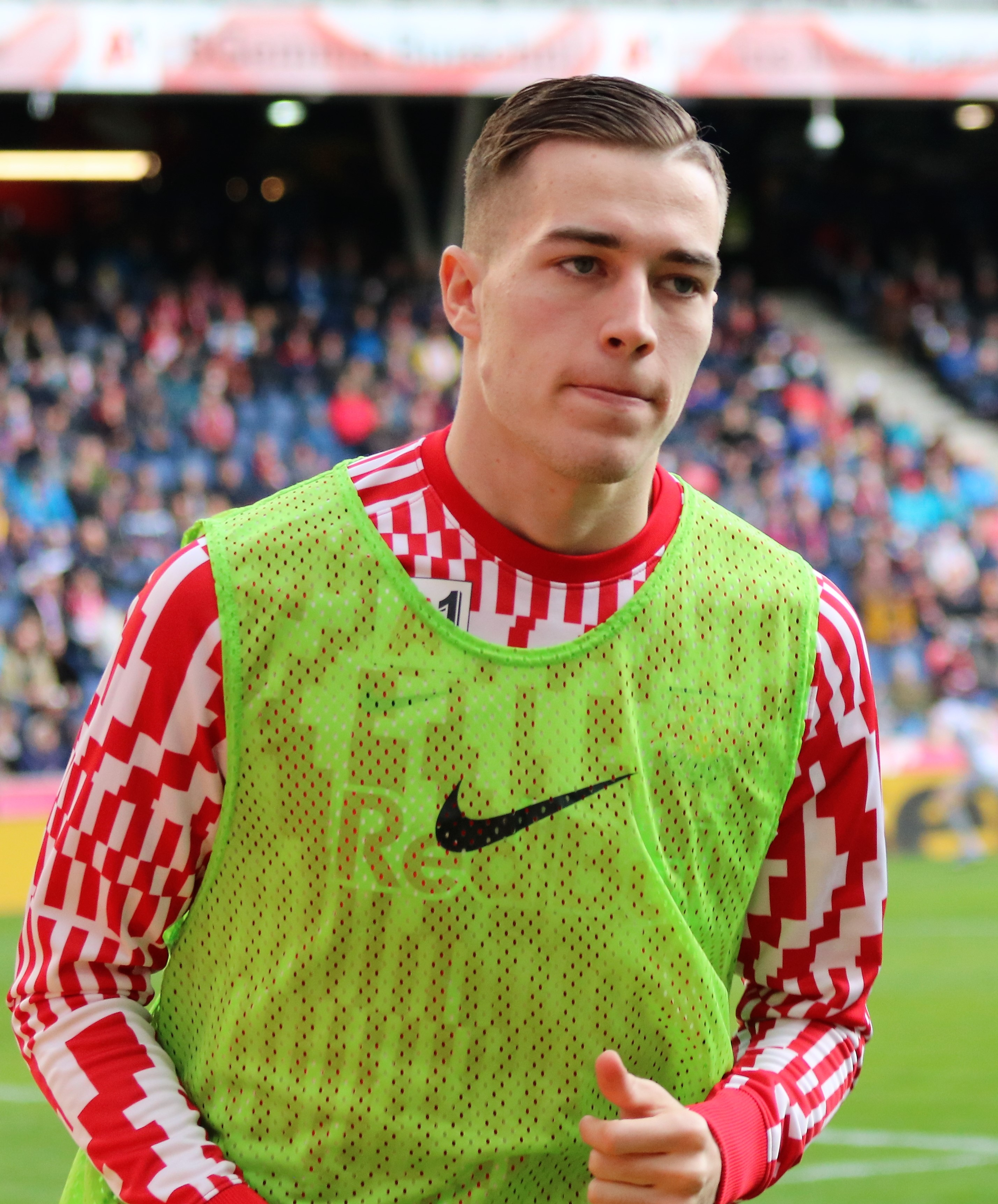
Sučić with Red Bull Salzburg in 2022

By the beginning of the 2021–22 season, Sučić already established himself in Salzburg's squad, most notably scoring an impressive goal against Barcelona in a friendly 2–1 victory on 4 August 2021. On 14 September, he scored his first Champions League goal in a 1–1 draw with Sevilla.

=== Real Sociedad ===
On 1 August 2024, he signed a 5-year contract with La Liga club Real Sociedad for a €10m fee plus a 10% sell-on clause. Later that year, on 6 October, he scored his first La Liga goal in a 1–1 draw against Atlético Madrid. On 20 February 2025, he netted a brace in a 5–2 win against Midtjylland during the Europa League knockout play-offs second leg, helping his team advance to the round of 16.

== International career ==
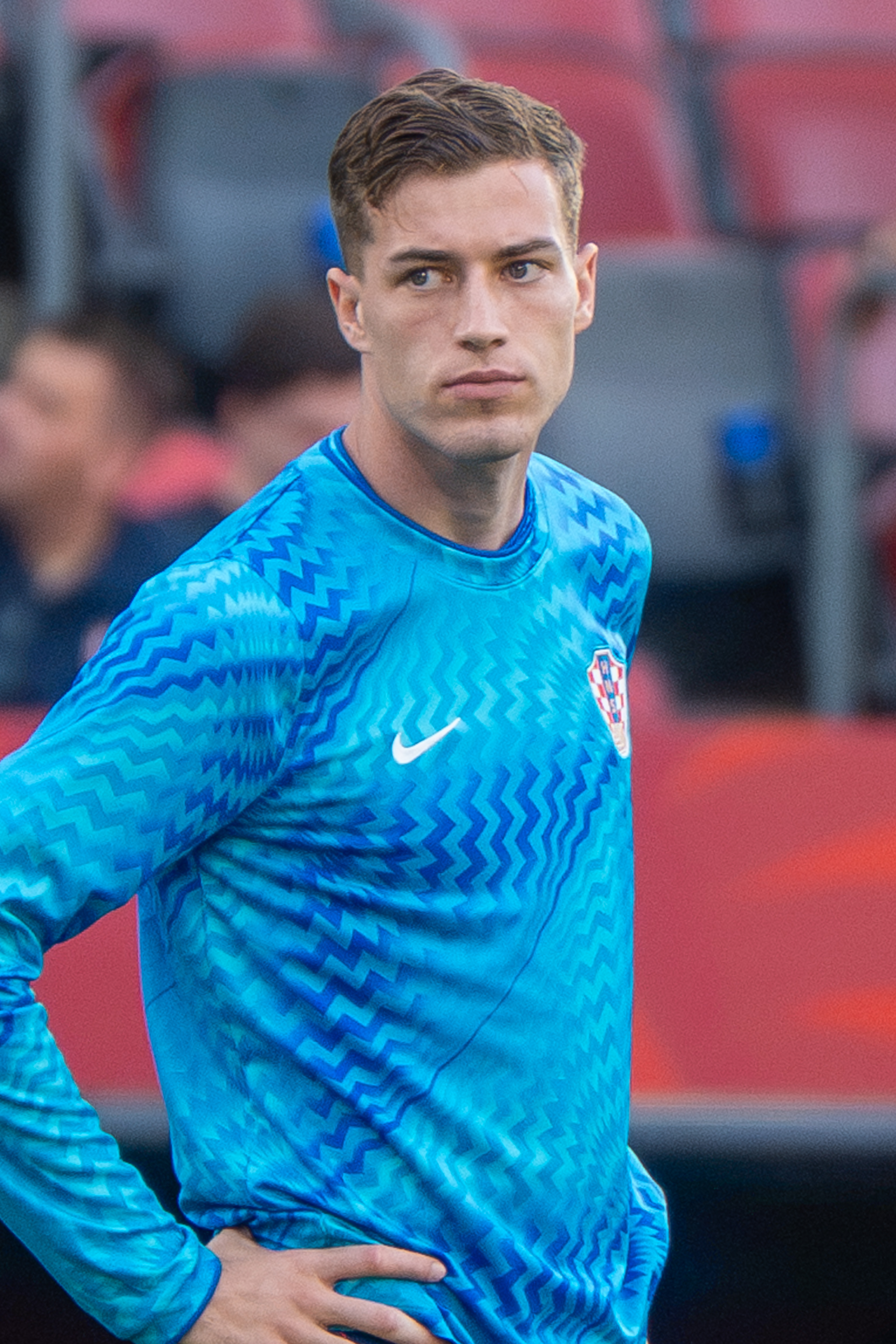
Sučić with Croatia, July 2026

Eligible for Austria, Bosnia and Herzegovina and Croatia, Sučić explicitly opted for Croatia, despite interest from the Austrian Football Association. On 9 March 2021, he was named in Igor Bišćan's 23-man squad for the group stage of UEFA Under-21 Euro 2021; however, he was ruled out on 21 March due to an injury and replaced by Matej Vuk. On 17 May, he was named in Bišćan's 23-man squad for the knockout stage of the tournament; however, the same occurred and he was replaced by Neven Đurasek on 25 May.

During UEFA Under-21 Euro 2023 qualifiers in September and October 2021, Sučić scored three goals and assisted once in three games, prompting Zlatko Dalić to call him up to the senior team on 9 October, two days ahead of a World Cup qualifier against Slovakia, due to Mateo Kovačić's suspension. He made his senior debut in the said qualifier, which ended as a 2–2 draw.

On 9 November 2022, Sučić was named in Dalić's 26-man squad for the 2022 FIFA World Cup, where he remained an unused substitute as Croatia finished third. Due to the recovery process from knee surgery he underwent in March 2023, Sučić was omitted from Croatia's 23-man squad for the 2023 UEFA Nations League Finals.

On 20 May 2024, Sučić was named in Dalić's preliminary 35-man squad for UEFA Euro 2024; on 7 June 2024, he made it to the final 26. At the tournament, he played in all three matches, as Croatia finished their campaign already in the group stage.

In May 2025, Sučić was called up for Croatia's 2026 FIFA World Cup qualifiers against Gibraltar and Czechia, played on 6 June and 9 June, respectively. Ahead of the Czechia game, Sučić left the national team's camp to attend his sister's wedding in Uskoplje, allegedly angering Dalić. Dalić refrained from commenting on the issue in public.

When Dalić announced the list of players for the September matches against the Faroe Islands and Montenegro, it was apparent that Sučić was not called-up. Dalić denied that Sučić was "either written off, or punished, or chased away" at a press conference ahead of the Faroe Islands game. Sučić eventually received an additional call-up before the October matches against Czechia and Gibraltar. On 12 October, in a 3–0 victory against the latter opponent, he scored his first goal for the national team.

On 18 May 2026, Sučić was selected in the 26-man squad for the 2026 FIFA World Cup.

== Personal life ==
Sučić was born in Linz to Bosnian Croat parents Željko and Branislava from Bugojno who fled from the Bosnian War. Despite being born in Linz, Sučić does not hold Austrian citizenship. He declared himself a fan of Hajduk Split and Barcelona; however, he named Luka Modrić, a legend of those clubs' respective rivals Dinamo Zagreb and Real Madrid, as his footballing role model. His cousin Petar Sučić is also a footballer.

== Career statistics ==
=== Club ===
As of match played 22 November 2026

Appearances and goals by club, season and competition
Club	Season	League			National cup (Note: Includes Austrian Cup, Copa del Rey)		Europe		Other		Total	
Club	Season	Division	Apps	Goals	Apps	Goals	Apps	Goals	Apps	Goals	Apps	Goals
FC Liefering	2019–20	Austrian 2. Liga	15	4	0	0	—		—		15	4
FC Liefering	2020–21	Austrian 2. Liga	11	2	0	0	—		—		11	2
FC Liefering	Total		26	6	0	0	—		—		26	6
Red Bull Salzburg	2020–21	Austrian Bundesliga	17	1	5	1	5 (Note: Three appearances in UEFA Champions League, two appearances in UEFA Europa League)	0	—		27	2
Red Bull Salzburg	2021–22	Austrian Bundesliga	28	8	6	2	10 (Note: Appearances in UEFA Champions League)	1	—		44	11
Red Bull Salzburg	2022–23	Austrian Bundesliga	15	0	3	0	7 (Note: Five appearances in UEFA Champions League, two appearances in UEFA Europa League)	0	—		25	0
Red Bull Salzburg	2023–24	Austrian Bundesliga	22	3	4	1	6	1	—		32	5
Red Bull Salzburg	Total		82	12	18	4	28	2	—		128	18
Real Sociedad	2024–25	La Liga	29	1	5	0	6 (Note: Appearances in UEFA Europa League)	2	—		40	3
Real Sociedad	2025–26	La Liga	22	3	6	1	—		—		28	4
Real Sociedad	2026–27	La Liga	12	4	0	0	4	2	0	0	16	6
Real Sociedad	Total		63	8	11	1	10	4	0	0	84	13
Career total			171	26	29	5	38	6	0	0	238	37

=== International ===
As of match played 26 September 2026

Appearances and goals by national team and year
National team	Year	Apps	Goals
Croatia	2021	1	0
Croatia	2022	3	0
Croatia	2023	1	0
Croatia	2024	11	0
Croatia	2025	2	1
Croatia	2026	5	0
Total		23	1

Scores and results list Croatia goal tally first, score column indicates score after each Sučić goal.

List of international goals scored by Luka Sučić
No.	Date	Venue	Opponent	Score	Result	Competition
1	12 October 2025	Stadion Varteks, Varaždin, Croatia	Gibraltar	2–0	3–0	2026 FIFA World Cup qualification

== Honours ==
Red Bull Salzburg

- Austrian Bundesliga: 2020–21, 2021–22, 2022–23
- Austrian Cup: 2020–21, 2021–22

Real Sociedad

- Copa del Rey: 2025–26

Croatia

- FIFA World Cup third place: 2022

Individual

- La Liga Goal of the Month: October 2024
- La Liga Goal of the Season: 2024–25
- Real Sociedad Player of the Season: 2024–25
