= 2023 UEFA European Under-21 Championship qualification Group D =

Football tournament qualification stage

Group D of the 2023 UEFA European Under-21 Championship qualifying competition consisted of six teams: Portugal, Greece, Iceland, Belarus, Cyprus, and Liechtenstein. The composition of the nine groups in the qualifying group stage was decided by the draw held on 28 January 2021, 12:00 CET (UTC+1), at the UEFA headquarters in Nyon, Switzerland, with the teams seeded according to their coefficient ranking.

== Standings ==
Pos	Team	Pld	W	D	L	GF	GA	GD	Pts	Qualification	Portugal	Iceland	Greece	Belarus	Cyprus	Liechtenstein
1	Portugal	10	9	1	0	41	3	+38	28	Final tournament	—	1–1	2–1	1–0	6–0	11–0
2	Iceland	10	5	3	2	25	7	+18	18	Play-offs	0–1	—	1–1	3–1	5–0	9–0
3	Greece	10	5	2	3	16	10	+6	17		0–4	1–0	—	2–0	0–0	4–0
4	Belarus	10	4	0	6	16	15	+1	12		1–5	1–2	0–2	—	2–0	6–0
5	Cyprus	10	3	2	5	16	16	0	11		0–1	1–1	3–0	0–1	—	6–0
6	Liechtenstein	10	0	0	10	0	63	−63	0		0–9	0–3	0–5	0–4	0–6	—

Source: UEFA
Rules for classification: Tiebreakers

== Matches ==
Times are CET/CEST, (Note: CEST (UTC+2) for dates between 31 March and 26 October 2021 and between 29 March and 24 October 2022, and CET (UTC+1) for all other dates.) as listed by UEFA (local times, if different, are in parentheses).

25 March 2021
16:30

Greece	0–0	Cyprus
	Report

Leoforos Alexandras Stadium, Athens
Attendance: 0
Referee: Allard Lindhout (Netherlands)

5 June 2021
17:00

Liechtenstein	0–5	Greece
	Report	G. Christopoulos 39'; Macheras 55'; Botos 61'; Zagaritis 65'; Sardelis 73'

Sportpark Eschen-Mauren, Eschen
Attendance: 39
Referee: Viktor Kopiyevskyi (Ukraine)

2 September 2021
16:00 (17:00 EEST)

Belarus	1–2	Iceland
Shestyuk 71'	Report	Haraldsson 20', 54'

OSK Brestsky, Brest
Attendance: 3,260
Referee: Juxhin Xhaja (Albania)

3 September 2021
18:00

Liechtenstein	0–6	Cyprus
	Report	Sotiriou 12' (pen.); Kakoullis 22'; Kosti 36'; Paroutis 53'; Charalambous 61'; Kyprianou 89'

Sportpark Eschen-Mauren, Eschen
Attendance: 70
Referee: Laurent Kopriwa (Luxembourg)

6 September 2021
20:00 (19:00 WEST)

Portugal	1–0	Belarus
Vieira 32' (pen.)	Report

Estádio José Gomes, Amadora
Attendance: 809
Referee: Christian-Petru Ciochirca (Austria)

7 September 2021
18:00 (19:00 EEST)

Cyprus	6–0	Liechtenstein
Kakoullis 31', 41' (pen.); Kosti 33', 38'; Gerolemou 46'; Pikis 63'	Report

AEK Arena – Georgios Karapatakis, Larnaca
Attendance: 161
Referee: Luis Texeira (Portugal)
7 September 2021
19:00 (17:00 WET)

Iceland	1–1	Greece
Þórðarson 37'	Report	Ioannidis 45+1'

Fylkisvöllur, Reykjavík
Attendance: 435
Referee: Gal Leibovitz (Israel)

7 October 2021
20:15 (19:15 WEST)

Portugal	11–0	Liechtenstein
Tavares 5'; Almeida 8'; Ramos 12', 19', 25', 39'; Silva 13', 44'; Vieira 37' (pen.); Tomás 63'; Conceição 76'	Report

Estádio do FC Vizela, Vizela
Attendance: 5,239
Referee: Vitālijs Spasjoņņikovs (Latvia)

8 October 2021
18:00 (19:00 EEST)

Belarus	0–2	Greece
	Report	Diamantis 27'; Sardelis 84'

Torpedo Stadium, Zhodino
Attendance: 320
Referee: Mohammad Al-Emara (Finland)

12 October 2021
17:00 (15:00 WET)

Iceland	0–1	Portugal
	Report	Vieira 55'

Víkingsvöllur, Reykjavík
Attendance: 502
Referee: Robert Ian Jenkins (Wales)
12 October 2021
18:00 (19:00 EEST)

Belarus	6–0	Liechtenstein
Morozov 15', 49', 59'; Oreshkevich 29' (pen.); Shestyuk 45+1'; Nikiforenko 68'	Report

Borisov Arena, Barysaw
Attendance: 50
Referee: Yasar Kemal Ugurlu (Turkey)

12 November 2021
15:00 (16:00 EET)

Greece	2–0	Belarus
Sourlis 16'; Supranovich 53' (o.g.)	Report

Theodoros Kolokotronis Stadium, Tripoli
Attendance: 660
Referee: Irakli Kvirikashvili (Georgia)
12 November 2021
15:00

Liechtenstein	0–3	Iceland
	Report	K. Hlynsson 15'; Á. Hlynsson 25'; Willumsson 31'

Sportpark Eschen-Mauren, Eschen
Attendance: 100
Referee: Joni Hyytiä (Finland)
12 November 2021
17:00 (18:00 EET)

Cyprus	0–1	Portugal
	Report	Ramos 15'

Antonis Papadopoulos Stadium, Larnaca
Attendance: 224
Referee: Jérémie Pignard (France)

16 November 2021
15:00 (16:00 EET)

Greece	1–0	Iceland
Michailidis 37' (pen.)	Report

Theodoros Kolokotronis Stadium, Tripoli
Attendance: 450
Referee: Alain Durieux (Luxembourg)
16 November 2021
15:00

Liechtenstein	0–4	Belarus
	Report	Latykhov 10', 44'; Lozhkin 46'; Nikiforenko 90+3'

Sportpark Eschen-Mauren, Eschen
Attendance: 68
Referee: Ashot Ghaltakhchyan (Armenia)
16 November 2021
20:15 (19:15 WET)

Portugal	6–0	Cyprus
Ramos 6', 53', 61'; Inácio 21'; Vieira 51'; H. Araújo 71'	Report

Estádio de São Luís, Faro
Attendance: 3,107
Referee: Kristoffer Karlsson (Sweden)

25 March 2022
18:00 (19:00 EET)

Greece	4–0	Liechtenstein
Michelis 21'; Kosidis 27'; Tzolis 38', 90+5'	Report

Theodoros Kolokotronis Stadium, Tripoli
Attendance: 405
Referee: Rauf Jabarov (Azerbaijan)
25 March 2022
21:15 (20:15 WET)

Portugal	1–1	Iceland
Ramos 34'	Report	Willumsson 17'

Estádio Municipal de Portimão, Portimão
Attendance: 4,094
Referee: Miloš Milanović (Serbia)

26 March 2022
15:00 (16:00 EET)

Cyprus	0–1	Belarus
	Report	Vegerya 32'

Dasaki Stadium, Achna
Attendance: 250
Referee: Joonas Jaanovits (Estonia)

29 March 2022
15:00 (16:00 EEST)

Cyprus	1–1	Iceland
Gerolemou 27'	Report	K. Hlynsson 90+4'

Dasaki Stadium, Achna
Attendance: 75
Referee: Georgi Davidov (Bulgaria)
29 March 2022
18:00 (19:00 EEST)

Greece	0–4	Portugal
	Report	Carvalho 12'; Vieira 32' (pen.); Silva 45+1'; H. Araújo 82'

Theodoros Kolokotronis Stadium, Tripoli
Attendance: 1620
Referee: Fabio Maresca (Italy)

1 June 2022
15:00 (17:00 AMT)

Belarus	2–0	Cyprus
Davyskiba 59'; Lozhkin 90+2'	Report

Yerevan Football Academy Stadium, Yerevan (Armenia) (Note: Due to the country's involvement in the Russian invasion of Ukraine, Belarus is required to play its home matches at neutral venues behind closed doors until further notice.)
Attendance: 0
Referee: Jakob Alexander Sundberg (Denmark)

3 June 2022
19:00 (17:00 WET)

Iceland	9–0	Liechtenstein
K. Hlynsson 3', 29' (pen.); Barkarson 5', 82'; Ingason 10'; Þórvaldsson 19', 33'; Willumsson 35', 37'	Report

Víkingsvöllur, Reykjavík
Attendance: 240
Referee: Ishmael Barbara (Malta)

4 June 2022
15:00 (17:00 AMT)

Belarus	1–5	Portugal
Vasilevich 90'	Report	Vieira 33', 56'; Ramos 50'; Costa 79'; Vitinha 90+4'

Yerevan Football Academy Stadium, Yerevan (Armenia)
Attendance: 0
Referee: Ondřej Berka (Czech Republic)

6 June 2022
18:30 (19:30 EEST)

Cyprus	3–0	Greece
Katsantonis 27' (pen.); Nikolaou 73'; Naoum 83' (pen.)	Report

Dasaki Stadium, Achna
Attendance: 257
Referee: Alexandre Boucaut (Belgium)

7 June 2022
20:45

Liechtenstein	0–9	Portugal
	Report	Silva 3', 27', 57'; Bernardo 43'; Vitinha 45', 65'; Carvalho 78'; H. Araújo 83'; Ramos 90'

Rheinpark Stadion, Vaduz
Attendance: 784
Referee: Denys Shurman (Ukraine)

8 June 2022
20:00 (18:00 WET)

Iceland	3–1	Belarus
K. Hlynsson 15'; Ingason 44'; Andrason 82'	Report	Zinovich 48'

Víkingsvöllur, Reykjavík
Attendance: 332
Referee: Sander van der Eijk (Netherlands)

11 June 2022
21:15 (19:15 WET)

Iceland	5–0	Cyprus
Ingason 11', 57'; Karamanolis 33' (o.g.); Magnússon 65'; K. Hlynsson 90'	Report

Víkingsvöllur, Reykjavík
Attendance: 895
Referee: Damian Sylwestrzak (Poland)
11 June 2022
21:15 (20:15 WEST)

Portugal	2–1	Greece
Bernardo 48'; Ramos 56'	Report	Koutsias 90+1'

Estádio Cidade de Barcelos, Barcelos
Attendance: 11,523
Referee: David Coote (England)

== Goalscorers ==
There were 114 goals scored in 30 matches, for an average of 3.8 goals per match.

12 goals

- (Portugal) Gonçalo Ramos

7 goals

- (Portugal) Fábio Vieira

6 goals

- (Iceland) Kristian Hlynsson
- (Portugal) Fábio Silva

4 goals

- (Iceland) Kristall Máni Ingason
- (Iceland) Brynjólfur Willumsson

3 goals

- (Belarus) Vladislav Morozov
- (Cyprus) Andronikos Kakoullis
- (Cyprus) Ioannis Kosti
- (Portugal) Henrique Araújo
- (Portugal) Vitinha

2 goals

- (Belarus) Dmitriy Latykhov
- (Belarus) Vladislav Lozhkin
- (Belarus) Oleg Nikiforenko
- (Belarus) Aleksandr Shestyuk
- (Cyprus) Giannis Gerolemou
- (Greece) Giannis Sardelis
- (Greece) Christos Tzolis
- (Iceland) Atli Barkarson
- (Iceland) Hákon Arnar Haraldsson
- (Iceland) Ísak Snær Þórvaldsson
- (Portugal) Paulo Bernardo
- (Portugal) Fábio Carvalho

1 goal

- (Belarus) Roman Davyskiba
- (Belarus) Yaroslav Oreshkevich
- (Belarus) Ilya Vasilevich
- (Belarus) Roman Vegerya
- (Belarus) Kirill Zinovich
- (Cyprus) Michalis Charalambous
- (Cyprus) Andreas Katsantonis
- (Cyprus) Hector Kyprianou
- (Cyprus) Giorgos Naoum
- (Cyprus) Thomas Nikolaou
- (Cyprus) Daniil Paroutis
- (Cyprus) Iasonas Pikis
- (Cyprus) Ruel Sotiriou
- (Greece) Giannis Christopoulos
- (Greece) Apostolos Diamantis
- (Greece) Giannis Fivos Botos
- (Greece) Fotis Ioannidis
- (Greece) Michalis Kosidis
- (Greece) Georgios Koutsias
- (Greece) Theodosis Macheras
- (Greece) Giannis Michailidis
- (Greece) Nikos Michelis
- (Greece) Vasilis Sourlis
- (Greece) Vasilis Zagaritis
- (Iceland) Viktor Örlygur Andrason
- (Iceland) Ágúst Hlynsson
- (Iceland) Sævar Atli Magnússon
- (Iceland) Kolbeinn Þórðarson
- (Portugal) André Almeida
- (Portugal) Francisco Conceição
- (Portugal) David Costa
- (Portugal) Gonçalo Inácio
- (Portugal) Nuno Tavares
- (Portugal) Tiago Tomás

1 own goal

- (Belarus) Nikita Supranovich (against Greece)
- (Cyprus) Andreas Karamanolis (against Iceland)
