= 2017–18 Norwich City F.C. season =

Norwich City
2017–18 season
- Chairman: Ed Balls
- Head Coach: Daniel Farke
- Stadium: Carrow Road
- Championship: 14th
- FA Cup: Third round
- EFL Cup: Fourth round
- Top goalscorer: League: James Maddison (14); All: James Maddison (15)
- Highest home attendance: 27,100
- Lowest home attendance: 24,841
Home colours	Away colours	Third colours

The 2017–18 season was Norwich City's second consecutive season in the Championship. This season they participated in the Championship, FA Cup and League Cup.

The season covered the period from 1 July 2017 to 30 June 2018.

== Transfers ==
=== Transfers in ===
Date from	Position	Nationality	Name	From	Fee	Ref.
1 July 2017	CM	(Bosnia and Herzegovina)	Mario Vrančić	(Germany) Darmstadt	Undisclosed	
1 July 2017	LM	(Wales)	Marley Watkins	(England) Barnsley	Free	
1 July 2017	CB	(Germany)	Christoph Zimmermann	(Germany) Borussia Dortmund II	Free	
11 July 2017	LB	(England)	James Husband	(England) Middlesbrough	Undisclosed	
14 July 2017	CB	(Germany)	Marcel Franke	(Germany) Greuther Fürth	Undisclosed	
28 July 2017	CM	(England)	Adam Phillips	(England) Liverpool	Free	
31 July 2017	CF	(England)	Tristan Abrahams	(England) Leyton Orient	Undisclosed	
4 August 2017	CM	(Germany)	Tom Trybull	(Netherlands) ADO Den Haag	Free	
6 August 2017	AM	(Germany)	Marco Stiepermann	(Germany) VfL Bochum	Undisclosed	
18 August 2017	CB	(England)	Sean Raggett	(England) Lincoln City	Undisclosed	
22 August 2017	CM	(Greece)	Savvas Mourgos	(England) Arsenal	Undisclosed	
30 August 2017	CB	(Scotland)	Grant Hanley	(England) Newcastle United	Undisclosed	
31 August 2017	CF	(Belgium)	Pierre Fonkeu	(Belgium) Club Brugge	Free	
3 January 2018	LM	(Republic of Ireland)	Simon Power	(Republic of Ireland) University College Dublin	Free	
22 January 2018	CM	(Scotland)	Kenny McLean	(Scotland) Aberdeen	Undisclosed	
25 January 2018	LM	(Cuba)	Onel Hernández	(Germany) Eintracht Braunschweig	Undisclosed	
25 January 2018	CF	(Germany)	Dennis Srbeny	(Germany) SC Paderborn	Undisclosed	

=== Transfers out ===
Date from	Position	Nationality	Name	To	Fee	Ref.
1 July 2017	CB	(Cameroon)	Sébastien Bassong	Free agent	Released	
1 July 2017	CB	(England)	Ryan Bennett	(England) Wolverhampton Wanderers (Note: Ryan Bennett joined Wolverhampton Wanderers following his release.)	Released	
1 July 2017	CF	(Northern Ireland)	Kyle Lafferty	(Scotland) Hearts (Note: Kyle Lafferty joined Hearts following his release.)	Released	
1 July 2017	CM	(Scotland)	Conor McGrandles	(England) Milton Keynes Dons	Free	
1 July 2017	DM	(Democratic Republic of the Congo)	Youssouf Mulumbu	(Scotland) Kilmarnock	Released	
1 July 2017	GK	(England)	Declan Rudd	(England) Preston North End	Undisclosed	
1 July 2017	GK	(England)	John Ruddy	(England) Wolverhampton Wanderers (Note: John Ruddy joined Wolverhampton Wanderers following his release.)	Released	
1 July 2017	CB	(England)	Michael Turner	(England) Southend United	Released	(Note: Michael Turner joined Southend United following his release.)
1 July 2017	RB	(Scotland)	Steven Whittaker	(Scotland) Hibernian	Released	(Note: Steven Whittaker joined Hibernian following his release.)
6 July 2017	DM	(Scotland)	Graham Dorrans	(Scotland) Rangers	Undisclosed (Note: Fee reported as £1,300,000)	
7 July 2017	CM	(England)	Jonny Howson	(England) Middlesbrough	Undisclosed	
19 July 2017	LM	(England)	Jacob Murphy	(England) Newcastle United	Undisclosed (Note: Fee reported as £12,500,000)	
10 August 2017	CM	(France)	Tony Andreu	(England) Coventry City	Released	(Note: Tony Andreu joined Coventry City following his departure.)
31 August 2017	AM	(Iceland)	Ágúst Hlynsson	(Denmark) Brøndby	Undisclosed	
26 October 2017	CF	(England)	Benny Ashley-Seal	(England) Wolverhampton Wanderers	Compensation	
12 January 2018	AM	(England)	Alex Pritchard	(England) Huddersfield Town	Undisclosed (Note: Fee reported as £10,000,000, rising to £12,000,000)	
16 January 2018	CF	(England)	Cameron Jerome	(England) Derby County	Undisclosed (Note: Fee reported as £1,500,000)	
29 January 2018	LB	(England)	Harry Toffolo	(England) Millwall	Free	
30 January 2018	CB	(Northern Ireland)	Joe Crowe	(Northern Ireland) Linfield	Free	
31 January 2018	LM	(Scotland)	Glenn Middleton	(Scotland) Rangers	Free	

=== Loans in ===
Start date	Position	Nationality	Name	From	End date	Ref.
1 July 2017	GK	(England)	Angus Gunn	(England) Manchester City	30 June 2018	
5 July 2017	CM	(England)	Harrison Reed	(England) Southampton	30 June 2018	
15 January 2018	AM	(England)	Marcus Edwards	(England) Tottenham Hotspur	30 June 2018	
25 January 2018	CM	(Germany)	Moritz Leitner	(Germany) FC Augsburg	30 June 2018	

=== Loans out ===
Start date	Position	Nationality	Name	To	End date	Ref.
1 July 2017	DM	(The Gambia)	Ebou Adams	(England) Shrewsbury Town	January 2018	
6 July 2017	CB	(Northern Ireland)	Joe Crowe	(Republic of Ireland) Limerick	5 November 2017	
11 July 2017	CF	(England)	Carlton Morris	(England) Shrewsbury Town	30 June 2018	
25 July 2017	RB	(England)	Louis Ramsay	(England) Woking	30 June 2018	
31 July 2017	CF	(England)	Tristan Abrahams	(England) Leyton Orient	31 August 2017	(Note: Loan contract was terminated by both clubs on 31 August 2017, due to the player's lack of appearances for the club.)
9 August 2017	RM	(England)	Diallang Jaiyesimi	(England) Grimsby Town	30 June 2018	
18 August 2017	CB	(England)	Sean Raggett	(England) Lincoln City	January 2018	
24 August 2017	CM	(England)	Ben Godfrey	(England) Shrewsbury Town	30 June 2018	
31 August 2017	CB	(Democratic Republic of the Congo)	Michee Efete	(England) Torquay United	3 January 2018	
31 August 2017	LB	(England)	Harry Toffolo	(England) Doncaster Rovers	3 January 2018	
19 October 2017	GK	(England)	Remi Matthews	(England) Plymouth Argyle	26 October 2017	
19 December 2017	CB	(Germany)	Marcel Franke	(Germany) Dynamo Dresden	30 June 2018	
3 January 2018	CM	(England)	Adam Phillips	(England) Cambridge United	30 June 2018	
9 January 2018	DM	(The Gambia)	Ebou Adams	(England) Leyton Orient	30 June 2018	
12 January 2018	RM	(Netherlands)	Yanic Wildschut	(Wales) Cardiff City	30 June 2018	
16 January 2018	CB	(Scotland)	Russell Martin	(Scotland) Rangers	30 June 2018	
18 January 2018	AM	(Scotland)	Steven Naismith	(Scotland) Hearts	30 June 2018	
22 January 2018	CM	(Scotland)	Kenny McLean	(Scotland) Aberdeen	30 June 2018	
28 January 2018	CM	(England)	Todd Cantwell	(Netherlands) Fortuna Sittard	30 June 2018	

== Players ==
=== First-team squad ===
As of 29 January 2018

Note: Flags indicate national team as defined under FIFA eligibility rules; some limited exceptions apply. Players may hold more than one non-FIFA nationality.

No.	Pos.	Nation	Player
1	GK	ENG	Angus Gunn (on loan from Manchester City)
2	DF	POR	Ivo Pinto (stand-in captain^{1})
3	DF	ENG	James Husband
4	MF	ENG	Harrison Reed (on loan from Southampton)
6	DF	GER	Christoph Zimmermann
8	MF	BIH	Mario Vrančić
9	FW	POR	Nélson Oliveira
10	MF	GER	Moritz Leitner (on loan from FC Augsburg)
11	MF	ENG	Josh Murphy
12	FW	WAL	Marley Watkins
14	MF	IRL	Wes Hoolahan (vice-captain)
15	DF	SUI	Timm Klose
16	MF	ENG	Matt Jarvis

No.	Pos.	Nation	Player
18	MF	GER	Marco Stiepermann
19	MF	GER	Tom Trybull
20	DF	ENG	Sean Raggett
23	MF	ENG	James Maddison
25	MF	GER	Onel Hernández
26	DF	NIR	Jamal Lewis
27	MF	NOR	Alexander Tettey
29	GK	ENG	Remi Matthews
31	DF	SCO	Grant Hanley
32	FW	GER	Dennis Srbeny
33	GK	NIR	Michael McGovern
34	MF	WAL	Louis Thompson

^{1} Current captain Russell Martin is on loan at Rangers, therefore Ivo Pinto will be the stand-in captain for the remainder of the season.

== Pre-season ==
=== Friendlies ===
As of 27 June 2017, Norwich City have announced nine pre-season friendlies against Lowestoft Town, Stevenage, Cambridge United, Charlton Athletic, Brighton & Hove Albion, Cobh Ramblers, Sutton United, MSV Duisburg and Arminia Bielefeld.

5 July 2017	Cobh Rambers (Republic of Ireland)	0–5	Norwich City	Cobh, Ireland
19:30 BST		Report	Tettey 5'; Oliveira 26'; Vrančić 28'; Maddison 33'; Pritchard 82'	Stadium: St Colman's Park; Attendance: 814; Referee: Anthony Buttimer

8 July 2017	Lowestoft Town	1–5	Norwich City	Lowestoft
15:00 BST	Cole 21'	Report	Jerome 25 (pen)' Naismith 38'; Watkins 44'; Oliveira 58'; Vrančić 62'	Stadium: Crown Meadow; Referee: Ady Sannerude

11 July 2017	Stevenage	2–2	Norwich City	Stevenage
19:45 BST	Samuel 32'; Gorman 68 (pen)'	Report	Oliveira 7 (pen)' Pritchard 24'	Stadium: Lamex Stadium; Referee: Darren Deadman

15 July 2017	Cambridge United	0–2	Norwich City	Cambridge
14:00 BST		Report	Josh Murphy 16'; Godfrey 18'	Stadium: The Abbey Stadium; Attendance: 2,663; Referee: David Rock

19 July 2017	MSV Duisburg (Germany)	0–2	Norwich City	Hilbeck, Germany
18:00 CEST	Nauber (red card) 27'	Report	Oliveira 58'; Bomheuer 61' (o.g.)	Stadium: Willi-Hafer Stadium

21 July 2017	Arminia Bielefeld (Germany)	1–3	Norwich City	Bielefeld, Germany
18:00 CEST	Voglsammer 39'	Report	Naismith 37'; Jerome 45+1 (pen)' Oliveira 86'	Stadium: SchücoArena; Attendance: 4,166; Referee: Markus Wollenweber

25 July 2017	Charlton Athletic	0–2	Norwich City	Charlton
19:45 BST		Report	Wildschut 34'; Naismith 55'	Stadium: The Valley; Attendance: 2,615; Referee: David Rock

28 July 2017	Sutton United	3–2	Norwich City XI	Sutton
19:45 BST	Wright 24'; Taylor 36'; Dundas 88'	Report	Jaiyesimi 12'; Cantwell 79'	Stadium: Gander Green Lane; Attendance: 804

29 July 2017	Norwich City	1–1	Brighton & Hove Albion	Norwich
15:00 BST	Watkins 42'	Report	Gross 21'	Stadium: Carrow Road; Attendance: 12,907; Referee: Darren Deadman

== Competitions ==
=== Overview ===
Competition	First match	Last match	Starting round	Final position	Record							
Competition	First match	Last match	Starting round	Final position	Pld	W	D	L	GF	GA	GD	Win %
EFL Championship	5 August 2017	6 May 2018	Matchday 1	14th	46	15	15	16	49	60	−11	32.61
FA Cup	6 January 2018	17 January 2018	Third round	Third round	2	0	2	0	1	1	+0	0.00
EFL Cup	8 August 2017	24 October 2017	First round	Fourth round	4	3	0	1	11	6	+5	75.00
Total					52	18	17	17	61	67	−6	34.62

Source: Soccerway

=== Championship ===
==== League table ====
Pos	Team	Pld	W	D	L	GF	GA	GD	Pts
12	Ipswich Town	46	17	9	20	57	60	−3	60
13	Leeds United	46	17	9	20	59	64	−5	60
14	Norwich City	46	15	15	16	49	60	−11	60
15	Sheffield Wednesday	46	14	15	17	59	60	−1	57
16	Queens Park Rangers	46	15	11	20	58	70	−12	56

Source: English Football League
Rules for classification: 1) Points; 2) Goal difference; 3) Number of goals scored

==== Results by matchday ====
Matchday	1	2	3	4	5	6	7	8	9	10	11	12	13	14	15	16	17	18	19	20	21	22	23	24	25	26	27	28	29	30	31	32	33	34	35	36	37	38	39	40	41	42	43	44	45	46
Ground	A	H	H	A	A	H	H	A	H	A	A	H	A	H	H	A	H	A	H	A	H	A	H	A	A	H	A	H	A	H	A	H	A	H	H	A	A	H	H	A	H	A	H	A	H	A
Result	D	L	W	L	L	W	D	W	D	W	W	D	W	L	L	L	D	L	D	L	W	L	L	W	D	W	W	L	W	W	D	D	D	D	D	L	D	W	L	L	W	D	L	D	W	L
Position	14	18	10	17	22	17	13	12	13	10	9	8	6	8	9	12	12	15	15	16	15	16	16	15	13	13	13	13	13	13	13	12	12	14	14	14	14	13	14	14	12	13	13	13	12	14

Updated to match(es) played on 6 May 2018. Source:
A = Away; H = Home; W = Win; D = Draw; L = Loss

==== Results summary ====
Overall								Home						Away					
Pld	W	D	L	GF	GA	GD	Pts	W	D	L	GF	GA	GD	W	D	L	GF	GA	GD
46	15	15	16	49	60	−11	60	8	8	7	25	25	0	7	7	9	24	35	−11

Last updated: 6 May 2018.

==== Matches ====
On 21 June 2017, the league fixtures were announced.

5 August 2017 1	Fulham	1–1	Norwich City	Fulham
15:00 BST	Martin 25' (o.g.); Cairney (yellow card) 66'; Johansen (yellow card) 85'; Fredericks (yellow card) 88'	Report	Oliveira 88', (yellow card) 89'; Maddison (yellow card) 90+4'	Stadium: Craven Cottage; Attendance: 20,134; Referee: James Linington

13 August 2017 2	Norwich City	1–3	Sunderland	Norwich
13:30 BST	Grabban 78' (o.g.)	Report	Grabban 27', 70'; Vaughan (yellow card) 53'; McGeady 60'	Stadium: Carrow Road; Attendance: 26,343; Referee: Andy Madley

16 August 2017 3	Norwich City	2–0	Queens Park Rangers	Norwich
19:45 BST	Oliveira 48'; Martin (yellow card) 72'; Reed 82'	Report	Lynch (yellow card) 15'	Stadium: Carrow Road; Attendance: 26,082; Referee: Oliver Langford

19 August 2017 4	Aston Villa	4–2	Norwich City	Birmingham
15:00 BST	Hourihane 22', 68', 85'; Green 42'; Hutton (yellow card) 58'	Report	Murphy (yellow card) 36' (goal) 62'; Franke (yellow card) 78'; Oliveira 79' (yellow card) 86'	Stadium: Villa Park; Attendance: 29,157; Referee: Jeremy Simpson

26 August 2017 5	Millwall	4–0	Norwich City	Bermondsey
15:00 BST	Gregory 15'; Saville 17' (yellow card) 35'; Wallace 42'; Webster (yellow card) 63'; Hutchinson 72'	Report	Husband (yellow card) 58'	Stadium: The Den; Referee: Tony Harrington

9 September 2017 6	Norwich City	1–0	Birmingham City	Norwich
15:00 BST	Oliveira 4'; Tettey (yellow card) 37'	Report	Colin (yellow card) 24'; Walsh (yellow card) 36'; Lowe (yellow card) 44'; Dean (yellow card) 45+1'; Davis (yellow card) 80'	Stadium: Carrow Road; Attendance: 26,335; Referee: Simon Hooper

12 September 2017 7	Norwich City	0–0	Burton Albion	Norwich
19:45 BST	Vrančić (yellow card) 62'; Jerome (yellow card) 90+3'; Klose (yellow card) 90+5'	Report	Murphy (yellow card) 54'; Buxton (yellow card) 90+4'	Stadium: Carrow Road; Attendance: 24,841; Referee: Andy Davies

16 September 2017 8	Sheffield United	0–1	Norwich City	Sheffield
15:00 BST	Coutts (yellow card) 63'; Fleck (yellow card) 65'	Report	Wildschut 23'; Tettey (yellow card) 59'; Husband (yellow card) 78'; Jerome (yellow card) 82'; Maddison (yellow card) 86'; Trybull (yellow card) 89'	Stadium: Bramall Lane; Attendance: 26,218; Referee: Scott Duncan

23 September 2017 9	Norwich City	0–0	Bristol City	Norwich
15:00 BST	Klose (yellow card) 90+2'	Report	Wright (yellow card) 90+3'	Stadium: Carrow Road; Attendance: 25,715; Referee: Keith Stroud

26 September 2017 10	Middlesbrough	0–1	Norwich City	Middlesbrough
19:45 BST	Howson (yellow card) 71'	Report	Maddison 13'; Wildschut (yellow card) 28'; Pinto (yellow card) 54'; Tettey (yellow card) 62'; Stiepermann (yellow card) 82'	Stadium: Riverside Stadium; Attendance: 24,084; Referee: Jeremy Simpson

30 September 2017 11	Reading	1–2	Norwich City	Reading
17:30 BST	Bacuna (yellow card) 6'; Moore 13' (yellow card) 60'; Beerens (yellow card) 63' van den Berg (yellow card) 66'	Report	Maddison 10'; Jerome 52'; Reed (yellow card) 78'; Watkins (red card) 90+2'	Stadium: Madejski Stadium; Attendance: 14,226; Referee: Tim Robinson

14 October 2017 12	Norwich City	1–1	Hull City	Norwich
15:00 BST	Wildschut (yellow card) 45+1'; Oliveira 90+6'	Report	Meyler (yellow card) 24' (yellow-red card) 57'; Dicko 29'; Larsson (yellow card) 57'; Stewart (yellow card) 74'; Hector (yellow card) 90+4'	Stadium: Carrow Road; Attendance: 25,666; Referee: Keith Stroud

22 October 2017 13	Ipswich Town	0–1	Norwich City	Ipswich
12:00 BST	Spence (yellow card) 31'; Chambers (yellow card) 71'; Downes (yellow card) 72'	Report	Maddison 58'	Stadium: Portman Road; Attendance: 24,928; Referee: Tim Robinson

28 October 2017 14	Norwich City	1–2	Derby County	Norwich
15:00 BST	Klose (yellow card) 60' (goal) 71'	Report	Nugent 45+1' (yellow card) 74'; Johnson (yellow card) 66'; Forsyth (yellow card) 69'; Winnall 83'	Stadium: Carrow Road; Attendance: 26,048; Referee: Peter Bankes

31 October 2017 15	Norwich City	0–2	Wolverhampton Wanderers	Norwich
19:45 GMT	Watkins (yellow card) 26'; Murphy (yellow card) 53'; Reed (yellow card) 90+4'; Stiepermann (yellow card) 90+5'	Report	Boly 18'; Cavaleiro (yellow card) 41'; Neves (yellow card) 64'; Bonatini 72'; Douglas (yellow card) 73'; Bennett (yellow card) 80'	Stadium: Carrow Road; Attendance: 26,554; Referee: Darren England

4 November 2017 16	Bolton Wanderers	2–1	Norwich City	Bolton
15:00 GMT	Henry (yellow card) 28'; Madine 35'; Armstrong 40'; Pratley (yellow card) 58'; Wheater (yellow card) 78'; Beevers (yellow card) 85'	Report	Zimmermann (yellow card) 77'; Vrančić (yellow card) 79'; Murphy 90+4'	Stadium: Macron Stadium; Attendance: 14,786; Referee: Steve Martin

18 November 2017 17	Norwich City	1–1	Barnsley	Norwich
15:00 GMT	Murphy 12'; Husband (yellow card) 34'	Report	Yiadom (yellow card) 44'; Barnes 47'; Williams (yellow card) 87'	Stadium: Carrow Road; Attendance: 25,545; Referee: Scott Duncan

21 November 2017 18	Nottingham Forest	1–0	Norwich City	West Bridgford
19:45 GMT	Bridcutt (yellow card) 49'; Murphy 77'	Report	Reed (yellow card) 65'; Zimmermann (yellow card) 90+6'	Stadium: City Ground; Attendance: 23,831; Referee: Tony Harrington

25 November 2017 19	Norwich City	1–1	Preston North End	Norwich
15:00 GMT	Maddison 34'; Vrančić (yellow card) 55'; Reed (yellow card) 63'; Oliveira (yellow card) 71'	Report	Johnson (yellow card) 6'; Fisher (yellow card) 41'; Barkhuizen 70'; Davies (yellow card) 73'; Gallagher (yellow card) 80'	Stadium: Carrow Road; Attendance: 25,167; Referee: Tim Robinson

1 December 2017 20	Cardiff City	3–1	Norwich City	Cardiff
19:45 GMT	Ralls 49' (pen.); Tomlin (yellow card) 54'; Hoilett 63'; Bogle 80'	Report	Klose (yellow card) 36'; Stiepermann 43'; Gunn (yellow card) 77'	Stadium: Cardiff City Stadium; Attendance: 17,033; Referee: Andy Davies

9 December 2017 21	Norwich City	3–1	Sheffield Wednesday	Norwich
17:30 GMT	Vrančić (yellow card) 48'; Maddison 54'; Klose 67'; Oliveira 90+3' (pen.)	Report	Rhodes 18'	Stadium: Carrow Road; Attendance: 25,561; Referee: James Linington

16 December 2017 22	Leeds United	1–0	Norwich City	Leeds
15:00 GMT	Jansson 41' (yellow card) 69'; Vieira (yellow card) 61'; Cooper (yellow card) 68'	Report	Oliveira (yellow card) 69'; Hanley (yellow card) 90+1'	Stadium: Elland Road; Attendance: 30,590; Referee: Darren England

22 December 2017 23	Norwich City	1–2	Brentford	Norwich
19:45 GMT	Stiepermann (yellow card) 45+2'; Pritchard (yellow card) 79'; Oliveira 90+1'	Report	Vibe 36', 41'; Sawyers (yellow card) 58'; Maupay (yellow card) 61'	Stadium: Carrow Road; Attendance: 26,725; Referee: Jeremy Simpson

26 December 2017 24	Birmingham City	0–2	Norwich City	Birmingham
15:00 GMT	Kieftenbeld (yellow card) 45+2'	Report	Pritchard 33'; Zimmermann (yellow card) 52'; Murphy 71' (yellow card) 79'	Stadium: St Andrew's; Attendance: 19,967; Referee: David Coote

30 December 2017 25	Burton Albion	0–0	Norwich City	Burton upon Trent
15:00 GMT	Murphy (yellow card) 54'	Report	Husband (yellow card) 30'	Stadium: Pirelli Stadium; Attendance: 4,565; Referee: Robert Jones

1 January 2018 26	Norwich City	2–1	Millwall	Norwich
15:00 GMT	Trybull 52'; Maddison 77'	Report	Morison 44'; Wallace (yellow card) 86'	Stadium: Carrow Road; Attendance: 25,774; Referee: Steve Martin

13 January 2018 27	Bristol City	0–1	Norwich City	Bristol
15:00 GMT	Baker (yellow card) 64'	Report	Maddison (yellow card) 25' (goal) 79'; Lewis (yellow card) 42'; Tettey (yellow card) 57'; Oliveira (yellow card) 83'; Pinto (yellow card) 90+7'	Stadium: Ashton Gate; Attendance: 21,282; Referee: Simon Hooper

20 January 2018 28	Norwich City	1–2	Sheffield United	Norwich
15:00 GMT	Pinto 70' (yellow card) 90+3'; Klose (yellow card) 90+1'	Report	Wilson 6'; Fleck (yellow card) 66'; Donaldson 68'; Leon Clarke (yellow card) 87'	Stadium: Carrow Road; Attendance: 26,486; Referee: Tony Harrington

27 January 2018 29	Brentford	0–1	Norwich City	Brentford
15:00 GMT	Canós (yellow card) 83'; Bjelland (yellow card) 90+5'	Report	Maddison 5'; Lewis (yellow card) 40'; Hanley (yellow card) 90+7'	Stadium: Griffin Park; Attendance: 10,252; Referee: Scott Duncan

3 February 2018 30	Norwich City	1–0	Middlesbrough	Norwich
15:00 GMT	Trybull 44' (yellow card) 45+1'; Tettey (yellow card) 90'	Report	Gestede (red card) 28'; Leadbitter (yellow card) 62'	Stadium: Carrow Road; Attendance: 25,960; Referee: Mike Jones

10 February 2018 31	Derby County	1–1	Norwich City	Derby
15:00 GMT	Vydra 12'; Carson (yellow card) 39'; Weimann (yellow card) 90'	Report	Tettey (yellow card) 30'; Reed (yellow card) 53'; Maddison 72' (pen.); Srbeny (yellow card) 90+1'	Stadium: Pride Park; Attendance: 27,171; Referee: Jeremy Simpson

18 February 2018 32	Norwich City	1–1	Ipswich Town	Norwich
12:00 GMT	Leitner (yellow card) 58'; Klose 90+4'	Report	Garner (yellow card) 55'; Skuse (yellow card) 64'; Connolly (yellow card) 66'; Waghorn (yellow card) 79'; Spence (yellow card) 81'; Chambers 88'	Stadium: Carrow Road; Attendance: 27,100; Referee: David Coote

21 February 2018 33	Wolverhampton Wanderers	2–2	Norwich City	Wolverhampton
19:45 GMT	Lewis 14' (o.g.); N'Diaye 25' (yellow card) 52'; Neves (yellow card) 36'; Jota (yellow card) 75'	Report	Zimmermann 27'; Oliveira 90+3'	Stadium: Molineux; Attendance: 29,100; Referee: James Linnington

24 February 2018 34	Norwich City	0–0	Bolton Wanderers	Norwich
15:00 GMT	Zimmermann (yellow card) 55'; Lewis (yellow card) 90+4'	Report	Pratley (yellow card) 37'; Morais (yellow card) 72'; Burke (yellow card) 76'; Ameobi (yellow card) 84'; Flanagan (yellow card) 90+2'	Stadium: Carrow Road; Attendance: 25,475; Referee: Keith Stroud

3 March 2018	Barnsley	P–P	Norwich City	Barnsley
15:00 GMT				Stadium: Oakwell
Note: Match postponed due to a frozen pitch

6 March 2018 35	Norwich City	0–0	Nottingham Forest	Norwich
19:45 GMT	Tettey (yellow card) 84'; Maddison (yellow card) 90'	Report	Figueiredo (yellow card) 34'; Colback (yellow card) 44'; Brereton (yellow card) 81'; Watson (yellow card) 85'; Darikwa (yellow card) 86'	Stadium: Carrow Road; Attendance: 25,184; Referee: Darren England

10 March 2018 36	Hull City	4–3	Norwich City	Kingston upon Hull
15:00 GMT	Irvine 6'; Hernández 41' (pen.), 48' (pen.); Larsson (yellow card) 56'; Wilson 71'; Clark (yellow card) 87'	Report	Maddison 18' (pen.), 19', 39' (pen.); Watkins (yellow card) 20'; Pinto (yellow card) 31'; Tettey (yellow card) 49'	Stadium: KCOM Stadium; Attendance: 15,120; Referee: Tim Robinson

13 March 2018 37	Barnsley	1–1	Norwich City	Barnsley
19:45 GMT	Lindsay (yellow card) 14'; McBurnie 45'; Gardner (yellow card) 75'	Report	Murphy 71'; Vrančić (yellow card) 77'	Stadium: Oakwell; Attendance: 11,508; Referee: Steve Martin

17 March 2018 38	Norwich City	3–2	Reading	Norwich
15:00 GMT	Vrančić 14'; Hanley 26' (yellow card) 62'; Hernandez (yellow card) 35'; Maddison 37' (pen.)	Report	Kelly 32'; Jaakkola (yellow card) 36'; Clement (yellow card) 45'; Smith 51'; Barrow (yellow card) 70'; Blackett (yellow card) 73'; Kermogant (yellow card) 89'	Stadium: Carrow Road; Attendance: 25,098; Referee: Oliver Langford

30 March 2018 39	Norwich City	0–2	Fulham	Norwich
15:00 BST	Murphy (yellow card) 83'; Maddison (yellow card) 90+1'; Reed (yellow card) 90+4'	Report	McDonald (yellow card) 58'; Johansen 66'; Cairney 70'; Fredericks (yellow card) 78'; Norwood (yellow card) 85'; Kamara (yellow card) 90+3'	Stadium: Carrow Road; Attendance: 26,750; Referee: Keith Stroud

2 April 2018 40	Queens Park Rangers	4–1	Norwich City	Shepherd's Bush
15:00 BST	Luongo 39' (yellow card) 41'; Smith 55'; Lynch (yellow card) 56'; Eze 60'; Manning 80'	Report	Manning 38' (o.g.); Husband (yellow card) 41'; Vrančić (yellow card) 68'; Hanley (yellow card) 77'; Zimmermann (yellow card) 80'	Stadium: Loftus Road; Attendance: 14,053; Referee: James Linington

7 April 2018 41	Norwich City	3–1	Aston Villa	Norwich
12:30 BST	Maddison (yellow card) 36' (goal) 72'; Murphy 45+2' (yellow card) 86'; Srbeny 54' (yellow card) 65'; Reed (yellow card) 63'	Report	Grealish 67' (yellow card) 82'; Hourihane (yellow card) 68'; Chester (yellow card) 90+4'	Stadium: Carrow Road; Attendance: 26,278; Referee: Peter Bankes

10 April 2018 42	Sunderland	1–1	Norwich City	Sunderland
19:45 BST	Honeyman 63'	Report	Pinto 89'	Stadium: Stadium of Light; Attendance: 24,894; Referee: David Coote

14 April 2018 43	Norwich City	0–2	Cardiff City	Norwich
15:00 BST	Murphy (yellow card) 90+2'	Report	Damour (yellow card) 44'; Peltier (yellow card) 66'; Zohore 86'; Hoilett 90+3'	Stadium: Carrow Road; Attendance: 25,503; Referee: Tim Robinson

21 April 2018 44	Preston North End	0–0	Norwich City	Preston
15:00 BST	Clarke (yellow card) 73'; Fisher (yellow card) 87'; Cunningham (yellow card) 89'	Report	Hanley (yellow card) 27'; Lewis (yellow card) 61'; Klose (yellow card) 88'; Maddison (yellow card) 89'; Pinto (yellow card) 90+5'	Stadium: Deepdale; Attendance: 13,038; Referee: Geoff Eltringham

28 April 2018 45	Norwich City	2–1	Leeds United	Norwich
15:00 BST	Hanley (yellow card) 33'; Hoolahan 45'; Murphy 69'	Report	Phillips 39'; Pennington (yellow card) 43'; Jansson (yellow card) 90+5'	Stadium: Carrow Road; Attendance: 26,869; Referee: John Brooks

6 May 2018 46	Sheffield Wednesday	5–1	Norwich City	Sheffield
12:30 BST	Nuhiu 14', 60', 90+3' (yellow card) 28'; Forestieri 30'; Venâncio 58'; Thorniley (yellow card) 89'	Report	Klose (yellow card) 57' (goal) 83'	Stadium: Hillsborough; Attendance: 28,189; Referee: Robert Jones

=== FA Cup ===
In the FA Cup, Norwich City entered the competition in the third round and were drawn at home to Chelsea.

6 January 2018 Third round	Norwich City	0–0	Chelsea	Norwich
17:30 GMT	Hanley (yellow card) 76'; Tettey (yellow card) 87'	Report	Luiz (yellow card) 41'; Cahill (yellow card) 62'	Stadium: Carrow Road; Attendance: 23,598; Referee: Stuart Attwell

17 January 2018 Third round replay	Chelsea	1–1 (a.e.t.) (5–3 p)	Norwich City	Fulham
20:00 GMT	Batshuayi 55'; Pedro (yellow card) 62' (yellow-red card) 117'; Willian (yellow card) 92'; Morata (yellow card) 120+1' (yellow-red card) 120+1'	Report	Lewis 90+4'; Maddison (yellow card) 97'	Stadium: Stamford Bridge; Attendance: 39,684; Referee: Graham Scott
	Penalties
	Willian (penalty scored); David Luiz (penalty scored); Azpilicueta (penalty scored); Kante (penalty scored); Eden Hazard (penalty scored)		Oliveira (penalty missed); Maddison (penalty scored); Vrančić (penalty scored); Murphy (penalty scored)

=== EFL Cup ===
On 16 June 2017, the first round draw took place with Swindon Town confirmed as opponents. A home tie was also confirmed for the second round, against Charlton Athletic. For the third round, an away tie against Brentford was confirmed. After reaching the fourth round for the third consecutive season, they were drawn to face Arsenal away from home.

8 August 2017 First round	Norwich City	3–2	Swindon Town	Norwich
19:45 BST	Jerome 27'; Hoolahan 39'; Maddison 42'; Franke (yellow card) 61'; Vrančić (yellow card) 90+4'	Report	Lancashire 25'; Dunne (yellow card) 34'; Mullin 62'; Iandolo (yellow card) 76'; Vigouroux (yellow card) 78'; Thomas (yellow card) 81'	Stadium: Carrow Road; Attendance: 13,166; Referee: Geoff Eltringham

22 August 2017 Second round	Norwich City	4–1	Charlton Athletic	Norwich
19:45 BST	Murphy 21', 52'; Watkins 73'; Trybull 89'	Report	Novak 5'	Stadium: Carrow Road; Attendance: 12,521; Referee: Nicholas Cooper

19 September 2017 Third round	Brentford	1–3	Norwich City	Brentford
19:45 BST	Barbet (yellow card) 15'; Clarke 90'	Report	Vrančić 10' (pen.), 51'; Watkins (yellow card) 31'; Zimmermann (yellow card) 55'; Hoolahan (yellow card) 60'; Murphy 68'	Stadium: Griffin Park; Attendance: 4,863; Referee: James Linington

24 October 2017 Fourth round	Arsenal	2–1 (a.e.t.)	Norwich City	Highbury, London
19:45 BST	Elneny (yellow card) 56'; Coquelin (yellow card) 68'; Wilshere (yellow card) 78'; Nketiah 85', 96'; Akpom (yellow card) 88'	Report	Murphy 34'; Trybull (yellow card) 89'; Husband (yellow card) 90'	Stadium: Emirates Stadium; Attendance: 58,444; Referee: Andrew Madley

== Statistics ==
=== Appearances, goals and cards ===
No.	Pos	Player	Championship			FA Cup			EFL Cup			Total			Discipline	
No.	Pos	Player	Starts	Sub	Goals	Starts	Sub	Goals	Starts	Sub	Goals	Starts	Sub	Goals	Booked	Sent off (straight red)
1	GK	Angus Gunn	46	0	0	2	0	0	3	0	0	51	0	0	1	0
2	DF	Ivo Pinto	31	4	2	2	0	0	4	0	0	37	4	2	5	0
3	DF	James Husband	14	4	0	—	—	—	3	0	0	17	4	0	5	0
4	MF	Harrison Reed	36	3	1	1	0	0	3	0	0	40	3	1	7	0
6	DF	Christoph Zimmermann	30	9	1	2	0	0	3	1	0	35	10	1	6	0
8	MF	Mario Vrančić	29	6	1	1	0	0	3	0	2	33	6	3	7	0
9	ST	Nélson Oliveira	26	11	8	1	1	0	1	0	0	29	12	8	5	0
10	MF	Moritz Leitner	10	2	0	—	—	—	—	—	—	10	2	0	1	0
11	MF	Josh Murphy	34	7	7	2	0	0	4	0	4	40	7	11	6	0
12	MF	Marley Watkins	12	12	0	—	—	—	2	1	1	14	13	1	3	1
14	MF	Wes Hoolahan	14	15	1	0	1	0	3	1	1	17	17	2	1	0
15	DF	Timm Klose	36	1	4	2	0	0	2	0	0	40	1	4	7	0
16	MF	Matt Jarvis	—	—	—	—	—	—	—	—	—	0	0	0	0	0
18	MF	Marco Stiepermann	15	8	1	0	1	0	1	2	0	16	11	1	2	0
19	MF	Tom Trybull	17	3	2	1	0	0	2	1	1	20	4	3	3	0
20	DF	Sean Raggett	0	2	0	—	—	—	—	—	—	0	2	0	0	0
23	MF	James Maddison	42	2	14	2	0	0	3	0	1	47	2	15	8	0
25	MF	Onel Hernández	5	7	0	—	—	—	—	—	—	5	7	0	1	0
26	DF	Jamal Lewis	19	3	0	2	0	1	—	—	—	21	3	1	4	0
27	MF	Alexander Tettey	21	2	0	1	1	0	1	1	0	23	4	0	9	0
31	DF	Grant Hanley	28	4	1	2	0	0	—	—	—	30	4	1	6	0
32	FW	Dennis Srbeny	7	7	1	—	—	—	—	—	—	7	7	1	2	0
33	GK	Michael McGovern	—	—	—	—	—	—	1	0	0	1	0	0	0	0
34	MF	Louis Thompson	—	—	—	—	—	—	—	—	—	0	0	0	0	0
—	ST	Tristan Abrahams	—	—	—	—	—	—	—	—	—	0	0	0	0	0
Players out on loan:
5	DF	Russell Martin	4	1	0	—	—	—	1	1	0	5	2	0	1	0
7	MF	Steven Naismith	2	0	0	—	—	—	1	0	0	3	0	0	0	0
13	GK	Paul Jones	—	—	—	—	—	—	—	—	—	0	0	0	0	0
17	MF	Yanic Wildschut	7	9	1	0	1	0	0	3	0	7	13	1	2	0
22	MF	Ben Godfrey	—	—	—	—	—	—	—	—	—	0	0	0	0	0
28	DF	Marcel Franke	5	0	0	—	—	—	2	1	0	7	1	0	2	0
29	GK	Remi Matthews	—	—	—	—	—	—	—	—	—	0	0	0	0	0
30	ST	Carlton Morris	—	—	—	—	—	—	—	—	—	0	0	0	0	0
35	DF	Adam Phillips	—	—	—	—	—	—	—	—	—	0	0	0	0	0
36	MF	Todd Cantwell	—	—	—	0	1	0	—	—	—	0	1	0	0	0
38	DF	Louis Ramsay	—	—	—	—	—	—	—	—	—	0	0	0	0	0
46	MF	Ebou Adams	—	—	—	—	—	—	—	—	—	0	0	0	0	0
—	MF	Kenny McLean	—	—	—	—	—	—	—	—	—	0	0	0	0	0
Players no longer at the club:
10	ST	Cameron Jerome	11	4	1	—	—	—	1	1	1	12	5	2	2	0
21	MF	Alex Pritchard	5	3	1	1	0	0	—	—	—	6	3	1	1	0
21	MF	Marcus Edwards	0	1	0	—	—	—	—	—	—	0	1	0	0	0
24	DF	Harry Toffolo	—	—	—	—	—	—	—	—	—	0	0	0	0	0
—	MF	Tony Andreu	—	—	—	—	—	—	—	—	—	0	0	0	0	0

=== Goalscorers ===
Rank	Pos.	Player	Championship	FA Cup	EFL Cup	Total
1	MF	James Maddison	14	0	1	15
2	MF	Josh Murphy	7	0	4	11
3	ST	Nélson Oliveira	8	0	0	8
4	DF	Timm Klose	4	0	0	4
5	MF	Tom Trybull	2	0	1	3
5	MF	Mario Vrančić	1	0	2	3
7	DF	Ivo Pinto	2	0	0	2
7	ST	Cameron Jerome	1	0	1	2
7	MF	Wes Hoolahan	1	0	1	2
10	MF	Harrison Reed	1	0	0	1
10	MF	Yanic Wildschut	1	0	0	1
10	MF	Marco Stiepermann	1	0	0	1
10	MF	Alex Pritchard	1	0	0	1
10	DF	Christoph Zimmermann	1	0	0	1
10	DF	Grant Hanley	1	0	0	1
10	ST	Dennis Srbeny	1	0	0	1
10	MF	Jamal Lewis	0	1	0	1
10	MF	Marley Watkins	0	0	1	1
Own goals			2	0	0	2
Totals			49	1	11	61
