= Silvan Schiess =

Liechtenstein footballer

Personal information
- Date of birth: 11 July 2003 (age 23)
- Place of birth: Uster, Switzerland
- Position: Defender

Team information
- Current team: Eschen/Mauren
- Number: 16

Youth career
- –2019: Wetzikon
- 2019–2020: Zürich
- 2020–2023: Rapperswil-Jona

Senior career*
Years	Team	Apps	(Gls)
2022–2023	Rapperswil-Jona	3	(0)
2023–2024	Balzers	4	(0)
2024–	Eschen/Mauren		

International career^{‡}
2021–	Liechtenstein U21	7	(0)
- * Club domestic league appearances and goals as of 20:22, 31 May 2025 (UTC) ‡ National team caps and goals as of 15:01, 15 February 2024 (UTC)

Silvan Schiess (born 11 July 2003) is a Liechtensteiner footballer who plays as a defender for 1. Liga club Eschen/Mauren and the Liechtenstein national team.

== Club career ==
In 2022 Schiess was part of the FC Rapperswil-Jona reserve side competing in the 2. Liga Interregional. The team began the season undefeated in its first five matches and had the highest goals-per-match average at that point. He scored three league goals during his final season with the club. Ultimately, Schiess made three appearances in the Swiss Promotion League for the first team.

In June 2023, Schiess joined Liechtensteiner club FC Balzers as the club prepared for its first season in the 1. Liga following promotion. He was unable to appear in any matches during the first half of the season after suffering a torn cruciate ligament. However, in January 2024, the club announced that he had been cleared to play the second half of the campaign.

== International career ==
Born in Switzerland, Schiess was called up to represent Liechtenstein for the first time for 2023 UEFA European Under-21 Championship qualification. He went on to make seven appearances for the team in the competition.

Schiess received his first senior call-up for a friendly against Gibraltar on 16 November 2022.
