= Willum Þór Willumsson =

Icelandic footballer (born 1998)

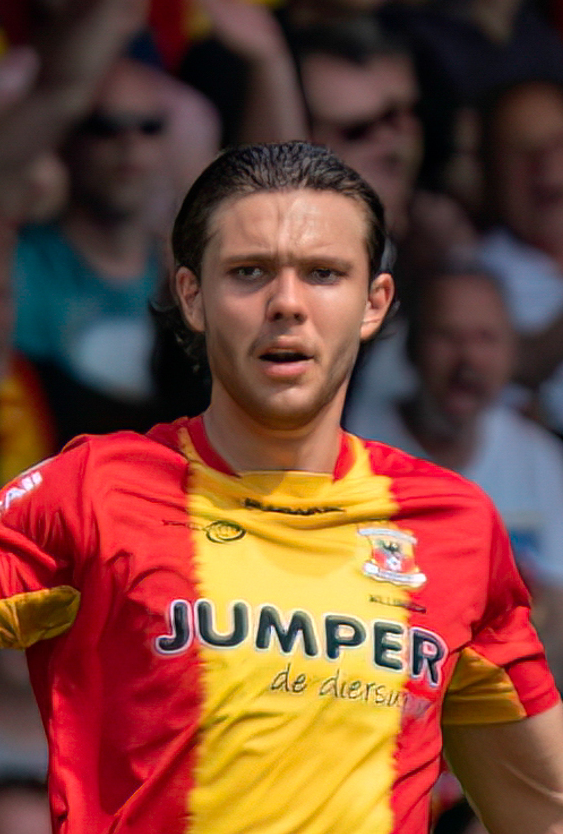
- Willum with Go Ahead Eagles in 2023

Personal information
- Date of birth: 23 October 1998 (age 28)
- Place of birth: Reykjavík, Iceland
- Height: 1.93 m (6 ft 4 in)
- Position: Midfielder

Team information
- Current team: NEC
- Number: 19

Youth career
- –2016: Breiðablik

Senior career*
Years	Team	Apps	(Gls)
2016–2018	Breiðablik	28	(6)
2019–2022	BATE Borisov	56	(9)
2022–2024	Go Ahead Eagles	58	(15)
2024–2026	Birmingham City	60	(6)
2026–	NEC	9	(1)

International career^{‡}
2016	Iceland U19	2	(0)
2018–2021	Iceland U21	19	(3)
2019–	Iceland	19	(0)
- * Club domestic league appearances and goals as of 18 October 2026 ‡ National team caps and goals as of 15:39, 3 June 2026 (UTC)

Willum Þór Willumsson (born 23 October 1998) is an Icelandic professional footballer who plays as a midfielder for Eredivisie club NEC and the Iceland national team.

== Club career ==
=== BATE Borisov ===
Willum signed with BATE Borisov in February 2019. In February 2022, he signed a six-month extension with the club.

=== Go Ahead Eagles ===
In July 2022, he joined Go Ahead Eagles in the Eredivisie.

=== Birmingham City ===
On 19 July 2024, recently relegated League One (third-tier) club Birmingham City signed Willum on a four-year contract. The fee was undisclosed. He made his debut in the starting eleven for the opening fixture of the season, a 1–1 draw at home to Reading, but left the field just after half-time after aggravating a knee problem.

=== NEC ===
On 1 February 2026, Willumsson returned to the Netherlands to join NEC on a two-and-a-half-year deal for an undisclosed fee.

== International career ==
Willum made his debut for the Iceland national team on 15 January 2019 in a friendly against Estonia, coming on as a 69th-minute substitute for Jón Dagur Þorsteinsson.

== Personal life ==
Willum is the son of Willum Þór Þórsson, a former football player and manager, former member of the Icelandic parliament and was Minister of Health. He is the brother of fellow footballer Brynjólfur Willumsson, who plays for Groningen.

== Career statistics ==
=== Club ===
As of match played 22 October 2026

Appearances and goals by club, season and competition
Club	Season	League			National cup (Note: Appearances in Icelandic Cup, Belarusian Cup, KNVB Cup, FA Cup)		League cup (Note: Appearances in Icelandic League Cup, EFL Cup)		Continental		Other		Total	
Club	Season	Division	Apps	Goals	Apps	Goals	Apps	Goals	Apps	Goals	Apps	Goals	Apps	Goals
Breiðablik	2016	Úrvalsdeild	1	0	0	0	0	0	—		—		1	0
Breiðablik	2017	Úrvalsdeild	8	0	1	0	6	1	—		—		15	1
Breiðablik	2018	Úrvalsdeild	19	6	4	0	4	0	—		—		27	6
Breiðablik	Total		28	6	5	0	10	1	—		—		43	7
BATE Borisov	2019	Belarusian Premier League	19	1	3	2	—		2 (Note: Appearances in UEFA Europa League)	0	—		24	3
BATE Borisov	2020	Belarusian Premier League	18	3	6	1	—		1	0	—		25	4
BATE Borisov	2021	Belarusian Premier League	9	1	4	1	—		—		1 (Note: Appearance in Belarusian Super Cup)	0	14	2
BATE Borisov	2022	Belarusian Premier League	10	4	5	1	—		—		1	0	16	5
BATE Borisov	Total		56	9	18	5	0	0	3	0	2	0	79	14
Go Ahead Eagles	2022–23	Eredivisie	27	8	2	0	—		—		—		29	8
Go Ahead Eagles	2023–24	Eredivisie	31	7	2	0	—		—		—		33	7
Go Ahead Eagles	Total		58	15	4	0	—		—		—		62	15
Birmingham City	2024–25	League One	41	6	3	1	1	0	—		3 (Note: Appearances in EFL Trophy)	0	48	7
Birmingham City	2025–26	Championship	10	0	1	0	1	0	—		0	0	12	0
Birmingham City	Total		51	6	4	1	2	0	—		3	0	60	7
NEC Nijmegen	2025–26	Eredivisie	4	0	2	0	—		—		—		6	0
NEC Nijmegen	2026–27	Eredivisie	5	1	0	0	—		4 (Note: Two appearances in UEFA Champions League, two appearances in UEFA Europa League)	0	—		9	1
NEC Nijmegen	Total		9	1	2	0	—		4	0	—		15	1
Career total			202	37	33	6	12	1	7	0	5	0	257	44

=== International ===
As of match played 31 May 2026

Appearances and goals by national team and year
National team	Year	Apps	Goals
Iceland	2019	1	0
Iceland	2020	0	0
Iceland	2021	0	0
Iceland	2022	0	0
Iceland	2023	7	0
Iceland	2024	7	0
Iceland	2025	3	0
Iceland	2026	1	0
Total		19	0

== Honours ==
Birmingham City

- EFL League One: 2024–25
- EFL Trophy runner-up: 2024–25

Individual

- Eredivisie Team of the Month: November 2023
