= 2016 Breiðablik UBK season =

Breiðablik
2016 season
- Manager: Arnar Grétarsson
- Stadium: Kópavogsvöllur
- Lengjubikarinn: Quarter-finals
- Top goalscorer: League: Arnþór Ari Atlason (2); Atli Sigurjónsson (2); All: Atli Sigurjónsson (4); Arnþór Ari Atlason (4)
Home colours	Away colours

The 2016 season is Breiðablik's 31st season in Úrvalsdeild and their 11th consecutive season in top-flight of Icelandic Football.

Along with the Úrvalsdeild, the club will compete in the Lengjubikarinn, Borgunarbikarinn and the 2016–17 Europa League first qualifying round.

Arnar Grétarsson's will head coach Breiðablik for the second season running after leading the team to 2nd in the league and bringing home the Icelandic league cup in his first season. He will be assisted by Kristófer Sigurgeirsson.

== First Team ==
As of 1 June 2016. These players competed in Úrvalsdeild, Borgunarbikarinn, Lengjubikarinn and the Europa League

Note: Flags indicate national team as defined under FIFA eligibility rules; some limited exceptions apply. Players may hold more than one non-FIFA nationality.

No.	Pos.	Nation	Player
1	GK	ISL	Gunnleifur Vignir Gunnleifsson (vice captain)
3	MF	ISL	Oliver Sigurjónsson
4	DF	ISL	Damir Muminovic
5	DF	ISL	Elfar Freyr Helgason
6	DF	ISL	Kári Ársælsson
7	MF	ISL	Höskuldur Gunnlaugsson
8	MF	ISL	Arnþór Ari Atlason
10	MF	ISL	Atli Sigurjónsson
13	FW	ISL	Sólon Breki Leifsson
14	MF	ISL	Óskar Jónsson
15	MF	ISL	Davíð Kristján Ólafsson
16	MF	ISL	Ágúst Eðvald Hlynsson

No.	Pos.	Nation	Player
17	FW	TTO	Jonathan Glenn
18	FW	ISL	Guðmundur Atli Steinþórsson
21	MF	ISL	Viktor Örn Margeirsson
22	MF	ISL	Ellert Hreinsson
23	MF	BRA	Daniel Bamberg
24	GK	ISL	Aron Snær Friðriksson
26	DF	ISL	Alfons Sampsted
28	MF	ISL	Alexander Helgi Sigurðsson
29	DF	ISL	Arnór Sveinn Aðalsteinsson (captain)
30	MF	ISL	Andri Rafn Yeoman
31	DF	ISL	Guðmundur Friðriksson
—	MF	ISL	Bjartur Þór Helgason

== Transfers and loans ==
=== Transfers In ===
Date	Position	No.	Player	From club	Other	Ref
16 October 2015	MF		(Iceland) Gunnlaugur Hlynur Birgisson	(Iceland) Víkingur Ó.	Back from Loan	
16 October 2015	GK	12	(Iceland) Hlynur Örn Hlöðversson	(Iceland) Tindastóll	Back from Loan	
16 October 2015	DF		(Iceland) Ósvald Jarl Traustason	(Iceland) Grótta	Back from Loan	
16 October 2015	MF		(Iceland) Ernir Bjarnason	(Iceland) Fram	Back from Loan	
16 October 2015	DF	26	(Iceland) Alfons Sampsted	(Iceland) Þór	Back from Loan	
20 October 2015	FW	18	(Iceland) Guðmundur Atli Steinþórsson	(Iceland) HK		
3 December 2015	FW	17	(Trinidad and Tobago) Jonathan Glenn	(Iceland) ÍBV		
23 December 2015	FW	11	(Spain) Sergio Carrallo	(Spain) UB Conquense		
22 February 2016	MF	23	(Brazil) Daniel Bamberg	(Norway) FK Haugesund		
6 May 2016	MF		(Iceland) Alexander Helgi Sigurðsson	(Netherlands) AZ Alkmaar		

=== Transfers Out ===
Date	Position	No.	Player	To club	Other	Ref
9 October 2015	MF	10	(Iceland) Guðjón Pétur Lýðsson	(Iceland) Valur		
16 October 2015	FW	17	(Trinidad and Tobago) Jonathan Glenn	(Iceland) ÍBV	Was on Loan	
26 November 2015	DF	23	(Iceland) Kristinn Jónsson	(Norway) Sarpsborg 08 FF		
22 February 2016	MF	11	(Iceland) Olgeir Sigurgeirsson	(Iceland) Völsungur		
22 February 2016	MF		(Iceland) Sölvi Pálsson	(Iceland) ÍR		
24 May 2016	FW	11	(Spain) Sergio Carrallo		Left by mutual consent	

=== Loans out ===
Start Date	End Date	Position	No.	Player	To Club	Ref
2 March 2016	16 October 2016	FW	27	(Iceland) Arnór Gauti Ragnarsson	(Iceland) Selfoss	
5 March 2016	16 October 2016	MF		(Iceland) Ernir Bjarnason	(Iceland) Vestri	
5 March 2016	5 April 2016	DF		(Iceland) Ósvald Jarl Traustason	(Iceland) Vestri	
1 April 2016	16 October 2016	MF		(Iceland) Gunnlaugur Hlynur Birgisson	(Iceland) Fram	
5 April 2016	16 October 2016	DF		(Iceland) Ósvald Jarl Traustason	(Iceland) Fram	
20 April 2016	16 May 2016	GK	24	(Iceland) Aron Snær Friðriksson	(Iceland) Tindastóll	
14 May 2016	16 October 2016	GK	12	(Iceland) Hlynur Örn Hlöðversson	(Iceland) Grindavík	
15 May 2016	16 October 2016	DF	33	(Iceland) Gísli Eyjólfsson	(Iceland) Víkingur Ó.	

== Pre-season ==
=== Fótbolti.net Cup ===
Breiðablik took part in the 2016 Fótbolti.net Cup, a pre-season tournament. They came into the tournament as holding champions. The team played in Group 2 along with ÍBV, Stjarnan and Víkingur Ó. Breiðablik finished third in the group with one win and two losses.

Breiðablik played FH in the 5th place final. They lost the match 1–0.

Date	Round	Opponents	Stadium	Result F–A	Scorers
9 January 2016	Group Stage	ÍBV	Fífan	0–2	
16 January 2016	Group Stage	Víkingur Ó.	Fífan	1–0	Atli Sig 41'(pen.)
20 January 2016	Group Stage	Stjarnan	Fífan	2–3	Viktor Örn 36' Gísli E 82'
30 January 2016	5th place final	FH	Fífan	0–1	

== Lengjubikarinn ==
Breiðablik were drawn in Group 2 in the 2016 Lengjubikarinn along with KA, Fylkir, Selfoss, Víkingur Ó and Fjarðabyggð. Breiðablik finished second in the group behind Fylkir and advanced through to the semi-finals.

Breiðablik lost to Valur in the quarter-finals 2–1. Guðmundur Atli scored Breiðablik's only goal in the game when he opened the scoring in the 16th minute.

Date	Round	Opponents	Stadium	Result F–A	Scorers
13 February 2016	Group Stage	Fylkir	Fífan	1–3	Arnþór Ari 21'
20 February 2016	Group Stage	KA	Fífan	2–1	Atli Sig 6'(pen) J. Glenn 78'
6 March 2016	Group Stage	Fjarðabyggð	Fjarðabyggðarhöllin	2–1	Höskuldur 43' J. Glenn 53'
11 March 2016	Group Stage	Víkingur Ó.	Fífan	2–2	Höskuldur 14' Atli Sig 21'
24 March 2016	Group Stage	Selfoss	Jáverk-völlurinn	1–0	Guðmundur Atli 42'
14 April 2016	Quarter Finals	Valur	Valsvöllur	1–2	Guðmundur Atli 16'

== Úrvalsdeild ==
=== League table ===
Pos	Team	Pld	W	D	L	GF	GA	GD	Pts	Qualification or relegation
4	Fjölnir	22	11	4	7	42	25	+17	37	
5	Valur	22	10	5	7	41	28	+13	35	Qualification for the Europa League first qualifying round (Note: Valur qualified for the Europa League first qualifying round by winning the 2016 Icelandic Cup.)
6	Breiðablik	22	10	5	7	27	20	+7	35	
7	Víkingur Reykjavík	22	9	5	8	29	32	−3	32	
8	ÍA	22	10	1	11	28	33	−5	31	

Source: KSÍ (in Icelandic), Soccerway
Rules for classification: 1) Points; 2) Goal difference; 3) Goals scored; 4) Head-to-head points; 5) Head-to-head goal difference; 6) Head-to-head goals scored; 7) Head-to-head away goals scored; 8) Play-off (only for deciding champion); 9) Draw.

=== Matches ===
Win Draw Loss Upcoming fixture

1 May 2016 1	Breiðablik	1–2	Víkingur Ó.	Kópavogur
19:15 GMT	Andri Rafn Yeoman 48'; Oliver Sigurjónsson (yellow card) 77'	Report	Þorsteinn Már Ragnarsson 33'; Kenan Turudija 83' (yellow card) 44' (yellow card) 90+1' (red card); Emir Dokara (yellow card) 29'; Alfreð Már Hjaltalín (yellow card) 57'	Stadium: Kópavogsvöllur; Attendance: 1731; Referee: Ívar Orri Kristjánsson

8 May 2016 2	Fylkir	1–2	Breiðablik	Reykjavík
19:15 GMT	Albert Brynjar Ingason 29'; Tonci Radovnikovic (yellow card) 21'	Report	Arnþór Ari Atlason 12'; Damir Muminovic 81'; Oliver Sigurjónsson (yellow card) 83'	Stadium: Floridana völlurinn Attendance: 1522; Referee: Vilhjálmur Alvar Þórarinsson

13 May 2016 3	Breiðablik	1–0	Víkingur R.	Kópavogur
20:00 GMT	Atli Sigurjónsson 15' (yellow card) 45'; Arnþór Ari Atlason (yellow card) 36'; Jonathan Glenn (yellow card) 45'; Daniel Bamberg (yellow card) 56'; Gísli Eyjólfsson (yellow card) 89'	Report	Viktor Bjarki Arnarsson (yellow card) 37' (yellow card) 39' (red card); Alex Freyr Hilmarsson (yellow card) 40'; Igor Taskovic (yellow card) 58'	Stadium: Kópavogsvöllur; Referee: Valdimar Pálsson

17 May 2016 4	Þróttur R.	2–0	Breiðablik	Reykjavík
19:15 GMT	Dion Jeremy Acoff 13' (yellow card) 16'; Vilhjálmur Pálmason 89'; Viktor Unnar Illugason (yellow card) 52'; Thiago Pinto Borges (yellow card) 78'; Aron Þórður Albertsson (yellow card) 82'	Report	Arnór Sveinn Aðalsteinsson (yellow card) 21' (yellow card) 44' (red card)	Stadium: Þróttarvöllur; Attendance: 905; Referee: Þorvaldur Árnason

22 May 2016 5	Breiðablik	1–0	KR	Kópavogur
20:00 GMT	Höskuldur Gunnlaugsson 35'; Oliver Sigurjónsson (yellow card) 58'	Report	Kennie Chopart (yellow card) 59'	Stadium: Kópavogsvöllur; Attendance: 1819; Referee: Ívar Orri Kristjánsson

30 May 2016 6	Stjarnan	1–3	Breiðablik	Garðabær
20:00 GMT	Arnar Már Björgvinsson 82'; Halldór Orri Björnsson (yellow card) 75'	Report	Daniel Bamberg 72'; Atli Sigurjónsson 80'; Arnþór Ari Atlason 90'; Höskuldur Gunnlaugsson (yellow card) 59'; Guðmundur Atli Steinþórsson (yellow card) 83'	Stadium: Samsung völlurinn Attendance: 1482; Referee: Vilhjálmur Alvar Þórarinsson

5 June 2016 7	Breiðablik	0–1	FH	Kópavogur
20:00 GMT	Ólafsson (yellow card) 72'; Daniel Bamberg (yellow card) 83'	Summary	Pálsson 5'	Stadium: Kópavogsvöllur; Attendance: 1,936; Referee: (Iceland) Thorvaldur Arnason

24 June 2016 8	Breiðablik	0–0	Valur	Kópavogur
19:15 GMT		Summary	Nikolaj Andreas Hansen (yellow card) 86'; Eiríksson (yellow card) 87'	Stadium: Kópavogsvöllur; Referee: (Iceland) Gunnar Sverrir Gunnarsson

15 June 2016 9	ÍBV	0–2	Breiðablik	Vestmannaeyjar
18:00 GMT	Jón Ingason (yellow card) 54'	Summary	Ellert Hreinsson 3' (yellow card) 23'; Carrillo 6' (o.g.); Glenn (yellow card) 47' (yellow-red card)	Stadium: Hásteinsvöllur; Attendance: 625; Referee: (Iceland) Gunnar Sverrir Gunnarsson

11 July 2016 10	Breiðablik	0–1	ÍA	Kópavogur
20:15 GMT	Damir Muminović (yellow card) 44'; Helgason (yellow card) 90+3'	Summary	Gunnlaugsson 11'; Arnór Snær Guðmundsson (yellow card) 28'; Darren Lough (yellow card) 41'; Ólafur Valur Valdimarsson (yellow card) 68'	Stadium: Kópavogsvöllur; Attendance: 962; Referee: (Iceland) Vilhjálmur Alvar Thórarinsson

17 July 2016 11	Fjölnir	0–3	Breiðablik	Reykjavík
21:00 GMT	Jugović (yellow card) 19'; Salquist (yellow card) 73'	Summary	Daniel Bamberg 18'; Gísli Eyjólfsson 23' (yellow card) 54'; Sigurjónsson (yellow card) 60'; Andri Rafn Yeoman 74'	Stadium: Fjölnisvöllur; Attendance: 1,054; Referee: (Iceland) Thorvaldur Arnason

24 July 2016 12	Víkingur Ólafsvík	0–2	Breiðablik	Ólafsvíkurvöllur
20:15 GMT	Alexis Egea Acame (yellow card) 44'; Tomasz Luba (yellow card) 70'	Summary	Vilhjálmsson 65'; Aðalsteinsson (yellow card) 75'; Arnþór Ari Atlason 85'; Ólafsson (yellow card) 87'	Stadium: Ólafsvík; Referee: (Iceland) Gudmundur Ársaell Gudmundsson

3 August 2016 13	Breiðablik	1–1	Fylkir	Kópavogur
20:15 GMT	Sigurjónsson (yellow card) 30'; Damir Muminović (yellow card) 53' (goal) 54'	Summary	Tómas Joð Þorsteinsson (yellow card) 49'; Emil Ásmundsson 57' (yellow card) 71'	Stadium: Kópavogsvöllur; Attendance: 1,065; Referee: (Iceland) Erlendur Eiriksson

8 August 2016 14	Vikingur Reykjavik	3–1	Breiðablik	Reykjavík
20:15 GMT	Ottar Karlsson 40' 72' 83'; Arnþór Ingi Kristinsson (yellow card) 47'; Lowing (yellow card) 70'	Report	Arni Vilhjálmsson 9'; Gísli Eyjólfsson (yellow card) 39'; Ólafsson (yellow card) 50'; Damir Muminović (yellow card) 62' (yellow-red card)	Stadium: Víkin; Attendance: 1,470; Referee: (Iceland) Thorvaldur Arnason

15 August 2016 15	Breiðablik	2–0	Þróttur	Reykjavík
20:00 GMT	Arni Vilhjálmsson 5'; Sigurjónsson 26'	Report	Viktor Illugason (yellow card) 24'; Aron Green (yellow card) 69'; Björgvin Stefánsson (yellow card) 87'	Stadium: Kópavogsvöllur; Attendance: 1,137; Referee: (Iceland) Thoroddur Hjaltalin

=== Results by matchday ===
Matchday	1	2	3	4	5	6	7	8	9	10	11	12	13	14	15	16	17	18	19	20	21	22
Ground	H	A	H	A	H	A	H	H	A	H	A	A	H	A	H	A	H	A	A	H	A	H
Result	L	W	W	L	W	W	L	D	W	L	W	W	D	L	W	D	W	D	W	D	L	L
Position	8	6	5	7	5	1	4	4	4	5	4	4	4	4	4	5	5	6	6	6	6	6

Updated to match(es) played on 1 October 2016. Source:
A = Away; H = Home; W = Win; D = Draw; L = Loss

=== Results ===
Overall								Home						Away					
Pld	W	D	L	GF	GA	GD	Pts	W	D	L	GF	GA	GD	W	D	L	GF	GA	GD
22	10	5	7	27	20	+7	35	4	3	4	9	10	−1	6	2	3	18	10	+8

Last updated: 1 October 2016.
Source: KSÍ

=== Points breakdown ===
- Points at home: 6
- Points away from home: 6
- 6 Points:
- 4 Points:
- 3 Points:
- 2 Points:
- 1 Point:
- 0 Points:

== Borgunarbikarinn ==
Breiðablik came into the Icelandic Cup, Borgunarbikarinn, in the 3rd round. The team was drawn against KRÍA from Seltjarnarnes. Breiðablik won the game 3–0 after it being goalless at halftime.

=== Matches ===
26 May 2016 3rd Round	KRÍA	0–3	Breiðablik	Seltjarnarnes
19:15 GMT	Valtýr Bjarnason (yellow card) 35'; Hafsteinn Bjarnason (yellow card) 49'; Lárus Brynjar Bjarnason (red card) 70'	Report	Guðmundur Atli Steinþórsson 61'; Ágúst Eðvald Hlynsson 70'; Arnþór Ari Atlason 87'	Stadium: Valhúsavöllur; Attendance: 180; Referee: Guðmundur Ársæll Guðmundsson

9 June 2016 Round of 16	ÍA	1–2 (a.e.t.)	Breiðablik	Akranes
19:15 GMT	Hallur Flosason (yellow card) 48'; Björnsson 60'; Arnór Sigurðsson (yellow card) 85'; Aron Ingi Kristinsson (yellow card) 101'; Tryggvi Hrafn Haraldsson (yellow card) 118'	Summary	Glenn 5'; Ágúst Eðvald Hlynsson 110'	Stadium: Akranesvöllur; Referee: (Iceland) Erlendur Eirksson

3 July 2016 Quarter Final	Breiðablik	2–3	ÍBV	Kópavogur
15:00 GMT	Gísli Eyjólfsson 43'; Aðalsteinsson 47'; Ólafsson (yellow card) 79'; Sigurjónsson (yellow card) 83'	Summary	Hafsteinn Briem 49'; Simon Smidt 54' 59'; Jón Ingason (yellow card) 69'; Sindri Snar Magnússon (yellow card) 90+3'	Stadium: Kópavogsvöllur; Referee: (Iceland) Thoroddur Hjaltalin

== Squad statistics ==
=== Goalscorers ===
Includes all competitive matches.

As of match played 30 May 2016

Rank	Pos.	No.	Player	Úrvalsdeild	Borgunarbikar	Lengjubikar	Europa League	Total
1	MF	10	(Iceland) Atli Sigurjónsson	2	0	2	0	4
2	MF	8	(Iceland) Arnþór Ari Atlason	2	1	1	0	4
3	MF	7	(Iceland) Höskuldur Gunnlaugsson	1	0	2	0	3
4	FW	18	(Iceland) Guðmundur Atli Steinþórsson	0	1	2	0	3
5	FW	17	(Trinidad and Tobago) Jonathan Glenn	0	0	2	0	2
6	MF	30	(Iceland) Andri Rafn Yeoman	1	0	0	0	1
7	DF	4	(Iceland) Damir Muminovic	1	0	0	0	1
8	MF	16	(Iceland) Ágúst Eðvald Hlynsson	0	1	0	0	1
9	MF	23	(Brazil) Daniel Bamberg	1	0	0	0	1

=== Goalkeeping ===
Includes all competitive matches.

As of match played 30 May 2016

Pos.	No.	Player	Clean Sheets	Goals Against	Penalties Saved
GK	1	(Iceland) Gunnleifur Gunnleifsson	2	15	0
GK	12	(Iceland) Hlynur Örn Hlöðversson	1	0	0
GK	24	(Iceland) Aron Snær Friðriksson	1	0	0

=== Appearances ===
Includes all competitive matches. Numbers in parentheses are sub appearances

As of match played 30 May 2016

No.	Pos.	Player	Úrvalsdeild	Borgunarbikar	Lengjubikar	Europa League	Total
1	GK	(Iceland) Gunnleifur Gunnleifsson	6	0	5	0	11
3	MF	(Iceland) Oliver Sigurjónsson	6	0	(1)	0	7
4	DF	(Iceland) Damir Muminovic	6	(1)	6	0	13
5	DF	(Iceland) Elfar Freyr Helgason	6	0	6	0	12
6	DF	(Iceland) Kári Ársælsson	0	1	(1)	0	2
7	MF	(Iceland) Höskuldur Gunnlaugsson	3 (3)	0	3 (1)	0	10
8	MF	(Iceland) Arnþór Ari Atlason	6	(1)	5	0	12
10	MF	(Iceland) Atli Sigurjónsson	3 (2)	1	5	0	11
11	FW	(Spain) Sergio Jose Carrallo Pendas	0	0	2 (1)	0	3
12	GK	(Iceland) Hlynur Örn Hlöðversson	0	0	1	0	1
13	FW	(Iceland) Sólon Breki Leifsson	0	(1)	0	0	1
14	MF	(Iceland) Óskar Jónsson	0	1	(1)	0	2
15	MF	(Iceland) Davíð Kristján Ólafsson	2 (2)	0	4 (1)	0	9
16	MF	(Iceland) Ágúst Eðvald Hlynsson	0	1	0	0	1
17	FW	(Trinidad and Tobago) Jonathan Glenn	4	0	5	0	9
18	FW	(Iceland) Guðmundur Atli Steinþórsson	2 (1)	1	2 (4)	0	10
20	MF	(Iceland) Ólafur Hrafn Kjartansson	0	0	(1)	0	1
21	MF	(Iceland) Viktor Örn Margeirsson	(1)	1	2 (1)	0	5
22	MF	(Iceland) Ellert Hreinsson	(4)	1	5	0	10
23	MF	(Brazil) Daniel Bamberg	6	0	0	0	6
24	GK	(Iceland) Aron Snær Friðriksson	0	1	0	0	1
26	DF	(Iceland) Alfons Sampsted	6	0	4 (2)	0	12
28	MF	(Iceland) Alexander Helgi Sigurðarson	0	1	0	0	1
29	DF	(Iceland) Arnór Sveinn Aðalsteinsson	3	1	4 (2)	0	10
30	MF	(Iceland) Andri Rafn Yeoman	6	0	6	0	12
31	DF	(Iceland) Guðmundur Friðriksson	1	1	(4)	0	6
33	MF	(Iceland) Gísli Eyjólfsson	(2)	0	1 (2)	0	5
	MF	(Iceland) Bjartur Þór Helgason	0	0	(1)	0	1

=== Disciplinary ===
Includes all competitive matches.

As of match played 30 May 2016

No.	Pos.	Player	Yellow card	Second yellow card	Red card
3	MF	(Iceland) Oliver Sigurjónsson	4	0	0
4	DF	(Iceland) Damir Muminovic	2	0	0
5	DF	(Iceland) Elfar Freyr Helgason	1	0	0
7	MF	(Iceland) Höskuldur Gunnlaugsson	1	0	0
8	MF	(Iceland) Arnþór Ari Atlason	2	0	0
10	MF	(Iceland) Atli Sigurjónsson	2	0	0
15	MF	(Iceland) Davíð Kristján Ólafsson	1	0	0
17	FW	(Trinidad and Tobago) Jonathan Glenn	2	0	0
18	FW	(Iceland) Guðmundur Atli Steinþórsson	2	0	0
21	MF	(Iceland) Viktor Örn Margeirsson	1	0	0
23	MF	(Brazil) Daniel Bamberg	1	0	0
29	DF	(Iceland) Arnór Sveinn Aðalsteinsson	1	1	0
33	MF	(Iceland) Gísli Eyjólfsson	2	0	0

=== Squad Stats ===
Includes all competitive matches; Úrvalsdeild, Borgunarbikar and Lengjubikar.

	Úrvalsdeild	Borgunarbikar	Lengjubikar	Europa League	Total
Games played	6	1	6	0	13
Games won	4	1	3	0	8 (61%)
Games drawn	0	0	1	0	1 (7%)
Games lost	2	0	2	0	4 (32%)
Goals scored	8	3	9	0	20
Goals conceded	6	0	9	0	15
Clean sheets	2	1	1	0	4
Yellow cards	11	0	11	0	22
Red cards	1	0	0	0	1

Last updated: 30 May 2016
