= Werl =

Werl, Germany
- Town
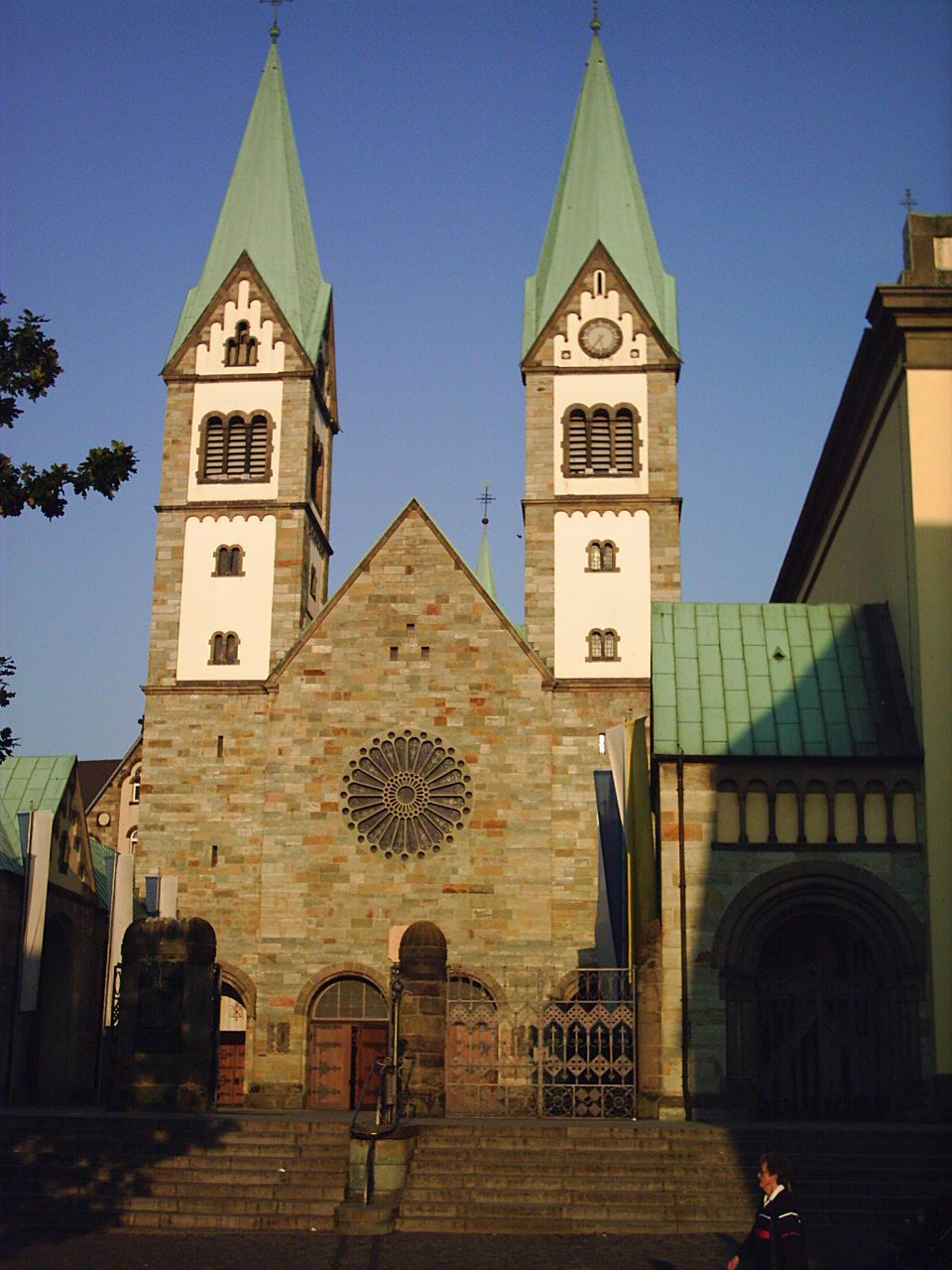
- Wallfahrtsbasilika

- Coat of arms

- Location of Werl, Germany within Soest district
- Interactive map of Werl, Germany
- Location within Germany Location within North Rhine-Westphalia
- Coordinates: 51°33′0″N 7°55′12″E
- Country: Germany
- State: North Rhine-Westphalia
- Admin. region: Arnsberg
- District: Soest
- Subdivisions: 10

Government
  - Mayor (2020–25): Torben Höbrink (CDU)

Area
  - Total: 76.35 km^{2} (29.48 sq mi)
- Elevation: 73–228 m (240–748 ft)

Population (2025-12-31)
  - Total: 29,693
  - Density: 388.9/km^{2} (1,007/sq mi)
- Time zone: UTC+01:00 (CET)
  - Summer (DST): UTC+02:00 (CEST)
- Postal codes: 59457
- Dialling codes: 02922
- Vehicle registration: SO
- Website: www.werl.de

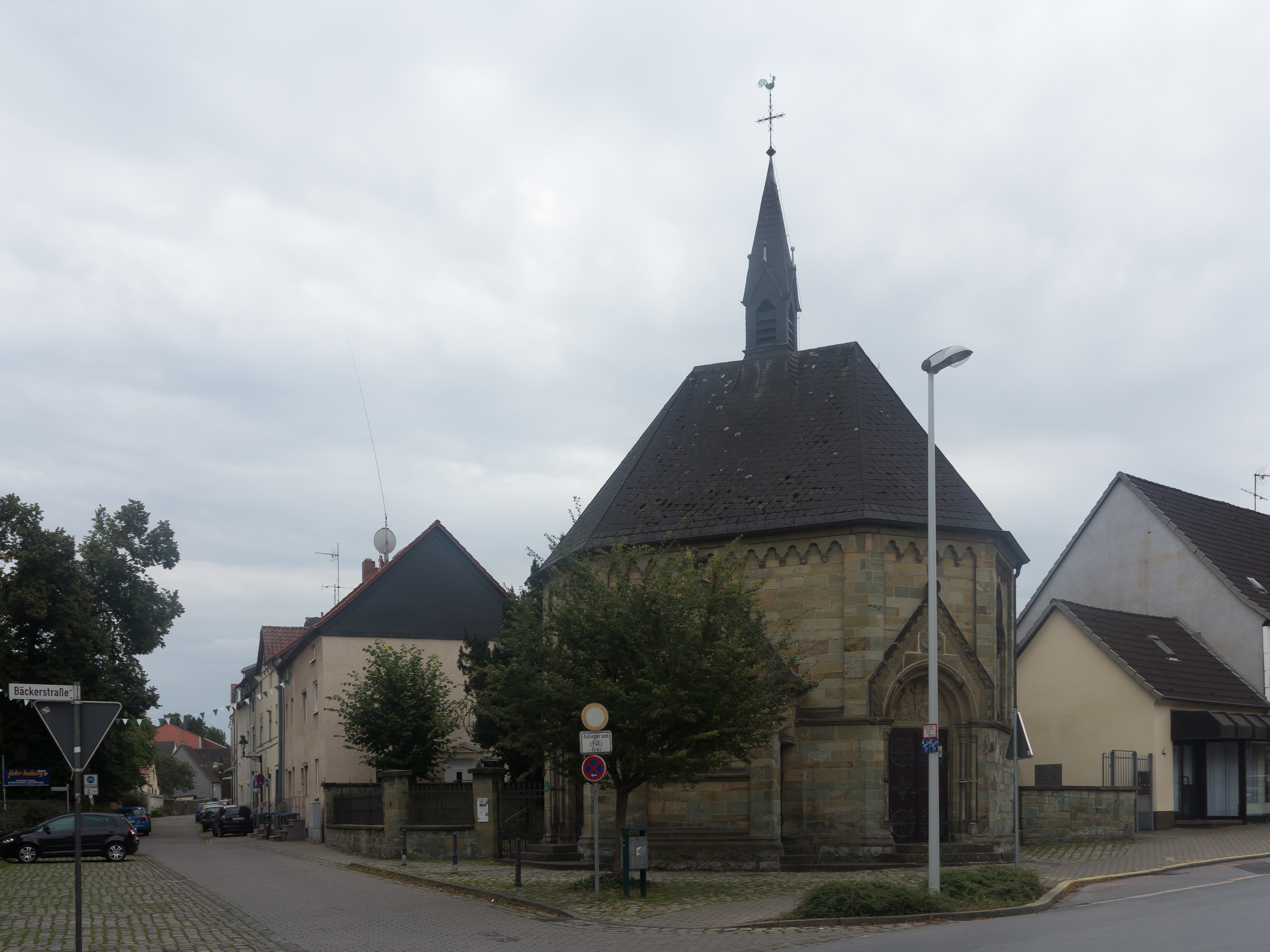
Werl, Chapelle Mutter Gottes in der Not

Werl (German pronunciation: [vɛʁl]; Westphalian: Wiärl) is a town in North Rhine-Westphalia and belongs to the Soest district in the Arnsberg administrative district. Werl is one of the largest and most important pilgrimage sites in Germany.

== Geography ==
=== Geographical location ===
Werl lies between the Sauerland, the Münsterland, Ruhr area and Hellweg in the fertile Börde landscape of the Werl-Unnaer Börde. At the end of 2018, Werl had 32,994 inhabitants on an area of 76.35 square kilometers; this corresponds to a population density of 432 people/km2. The highest point in the city is at 228.4 m above sea level. NN in the city forest to the south. The deepest point is 73.1 m above sea level. NN in the northern part of the city on the Flerke farm. The city of Werl lies on the southern edge of the Westphalian Bay. Therefore, the terrain profile in the urban area is predominantly flat. In the southern area the terrain rises sharply towards the Haarstrang. It separates the lowlands from the mountainous Sauerland. In the south, the Werl city forest stretches across the hair strand. This is the only area in the city that is densely covered with trees. The Werler part of the lowlands is, in terms of landscape and economy, more dominated by agriculture.

=== Werl as a middle center ===
While the surrounding area is more rural, Werl is mainly home to industrial, commercial and service industries. As a middle center in the region, Werl not only provides jobs, but also offers a wide range of schools, further education opportunities at adult education centers, a leisure pool, a city library, a painting school, a music school, a city history museum and a historic old town. Werl also had the "Forum der Völker", an ethnological museum, which closed permanently in early 2024.

=== Division of the town ===
Werl consists of the following sections:districts:

- Budberg (584 inhabitants)
- Büderich (3012 inhabitants)
- Hilbeck (1303 inhabitants)
- Holtum (1038 inhabitants)
- Mawicke (499 inhabitants)
- Niederbergstraße (228 inhabitants)
- Oberbergstraße (347 inhabitants)
- Sönnern (856 inhabitants)
- Westönnen (2582 inhabitants)
- Werl (22151 inhabitants)

=== Neighbouring municipalities ===
- Arnsberg
- Hamm
- Soest
- Unna
- Welver
- Wickede

== History ==
Werl was a member of the Hanseatic League in the Middle Ages and since 1661 has had a statue of the Virgin Mary, making it a place of pilgrimage. Today this relic is in the Wallfahrtsbasilika and is looked after by the Franciscan religious order. Werl Prison is the third largest in North Rhine-Westphalia, Werl Prison.

From 1953 to 1970, Werl was one of three garrison towns — alongside Soest and Hemer — used by the Canadian Army as part of Canada's NATO commitment under the British Army of the Rhine. Three purpose-built single-storey barracks were constructed on the edge of the town: Fort Victoria, Fort St Anne and Fort St Louis, accommodating an engineer regiment, a field ambulance and an infantry battalion of 4 Canadian Infantry Brigade Group (renamed 4 Canadian Mechanized Brigade Group in May 1968).

Married soldiers and their families lived in a dedicated Canadian residential settlement inside Werl. The site also housed Radio Canadian Army Europe (CAE), the first Canadian military FM radio station on German soil, which broadcast from Fort Victoria until 18 October 1970.

When 4 CMBG relocated to CFB Lahr in 1970–71, the barracks were transferred to the British Army of the Rhine. Fort Victoria was renamed Vittoria Barracks, and Forts St Louis and Anne were combined as Albuhera Barracks.

Successive British infantry battalions were stationed there: 2nd Queen's Regiment (1971–1975), 1st Queen's (1975–1980), 1st Black Watch (1980–1985), 1st Royal Scots (1985–1991), and 1st Devonshire and Dorset Regiment (August 1991 – June 1994). British forces vacated the site in June 1994, and the barracks have stood abandoned since.

A total of 474 Canadians — 124 post-war military personnel and 350 dependants — are buried in Werl Central Cemetery, the largest concentration of Canadian post-war graves in either Germany or France.

The 4th United States Army Field Artillery Detachment was stationed in Werl until 1992.

== Population ==
Historical population

Year	Pop.	±% p.a.
1965	24,942	—
1970	25,366	+0.34%
1975	25,813	+0.35%
1980	25,808	−0.00%
1985	25,986	+0.14%
1990	28,554	+1.90%
1995	30,533	+1.35%

Year	Pop.	±% p.a.
2000	31,623	+0.70%
2005	32,198	+0.36%
2010	31,655	−0.34%
2015	30,638	−0.65%
2020	30,702	+0.04%
2025	29,693	−0.67%

Source: Landesdatabank Nordrhein-Westfalen

== Notable people ==
- Philipp Rosenthal (1855–1937), businessman and founder of Rosenthal AG at Schloss Erkersreuth in Selb
- Franz von Papen (1879–1969), Conservative politician, diplomat, nobleman and General Staff officer; served as Chancellor of Germany in 1932 and as Vice-Chancellor under Adolf Hitler from 1933 to 1934
- Ulla Wiesner (born 1940), singer
- Theodor Redder (born 1941), footballer
- Dimitri Hegemann (born 1954), cultural manager, musician and founder of the club "Tresor" in Berlin
- Andreas Englisch (born 1963), journalist
- Martin Kree (born 1965), footballer
- Uwe Grauer (born 1970), footballer and coach

== Twin towns – sister cities ==
Werl is twinned with:

- Halle, Belgium (1973)
