= 4th United States Army Field Artillery Detachment =

American military unit in West Germany

The 4th United States Army Field Artillery Detachment was located in Werl, West Germany. The Belgian 14th and 20th Artillery Battalions of the Belgian I Corps were supported by the 4th U.S. Army Field Artillery Detachment. The detachment was co-located with the Belgian battalions, in quarters across the street from the Belgian Houthulst Kaserne, on Langenwiedenweg Strasse, Werl, Westfallen, Germany. In this period, the unit was a custodial detachment, responsible for maintaining physical control of nuclear warheads for Belgian Honest John rocket systems, which were later replaced by the MGM-52 Lance.

The 4th U.S. Army Field Artillery Detachment was activated in September 1962 at Fort Sill, Oklahoma. It was originally designated the 4th U.S. Army Missile Detachment and assigned to the 5th U.S. Army Artillery Group (USAAG). In January 1963, the 4th Missile Detachment, along with other units of the 5th USAAG, left for Germany and arrived in Bremerhaven in February. In September 1970, the 4th Missile Detachment was redesignated the 4th U.S. Army Artillery Detachment. In October 1978, the 4th was reassigned to the 570th USAAG. The unit was inactivated in June 1992.
