= Andreas Englisch =

German journalist (born 1963)

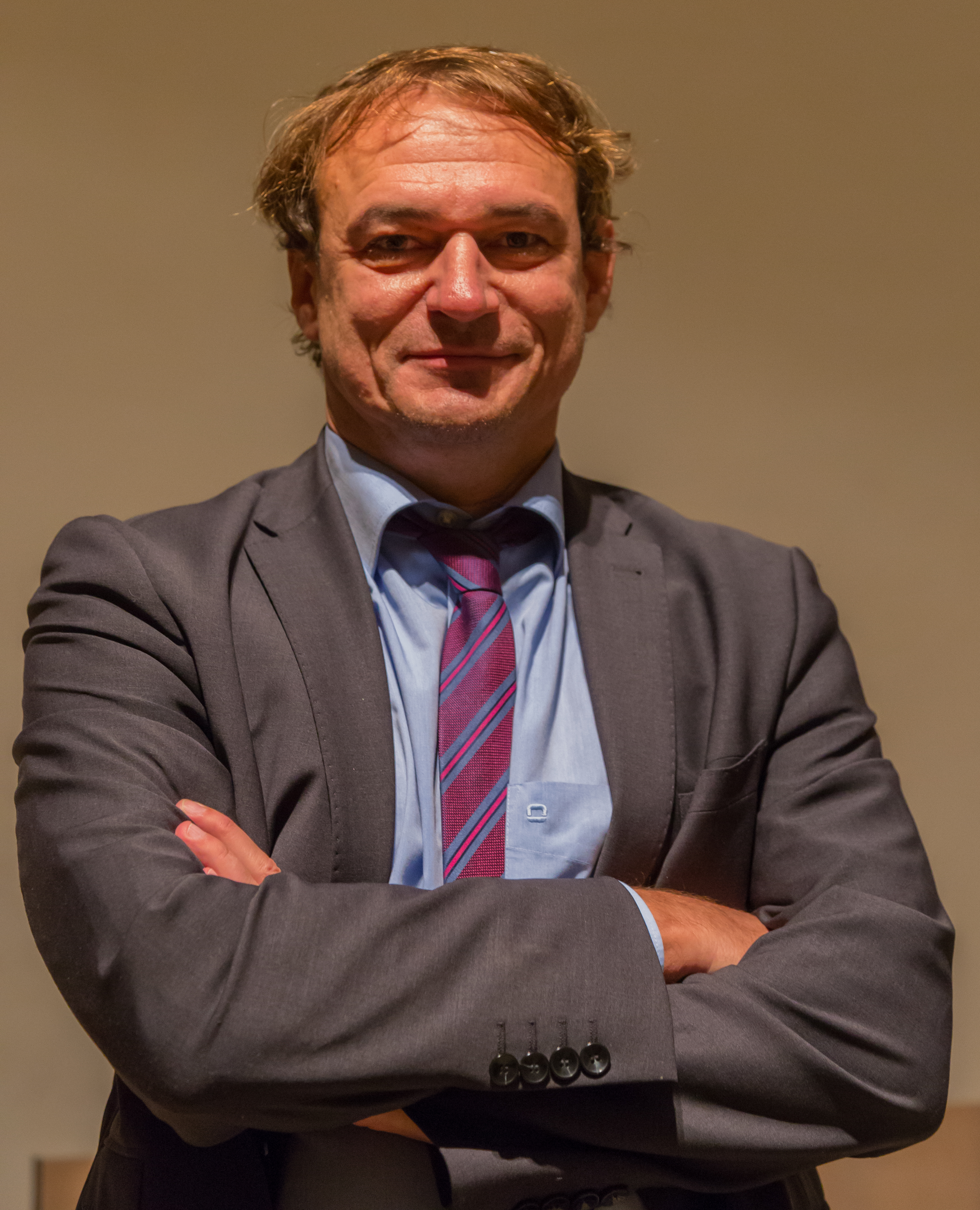
Andreas Englisch in 2016

Andreas Englisch (born 6 June 1963 in Werl) is a German journalist and author of several books who specializes in reporting on the Vatican.

== Biography ==
Englisch graduated from Marien-Gymnasium Werl in 1983. He then studied literature and journalism in Hamburg.

He moved to Rome in 1987, only planning to stay there for six months, to learn Italian. He headed the Roman correspondent office of the Axel Springer publishing house for ten years. Until the end of March 2010, he was the permanent Italian and Vatican correspondent exclusively for Bild and Bild am Sonntag. He was then recalled by Bild editor-in-chief Kai Diekmann and assigned to another position in the publishing house. Since then he is working as a freelande journalist.

Since 1995, he has sometimes accompanied popes on their travels by plane. In 2004, he wrote a biography about his experiences during his travels with Pope John Paul II. During his travels with Pope John Paul II, he changed from being an original critic of the Pope to a Pope admirer, which he traced in his biography of the Pope John Paul II: The Secret of Karol Wojtyła (2004). In the following years, his books God's Footsteps (2006) and The Miracle Pope (2011) were published, in which he characterized John Paul II as a "miracle pope".

Englisch later received public attention through his prediction that Pope Benedict XVI would resign from office, which proved to be correct in February 2013.

Englisch presented the story behind the Giuseppe Gulotta case to the public.

Englisch considered Pope Francis a close friend. He wrote four books about the pontiff.

He also wrote a book about Pope Leo XIV, which was released 2025 first in German with the title Leo XIV: Der leise Mönch an der Spitze der Macht ("Leo XIV: The silent monk at the pinnacle of power"). The english version of the book was released in 2026 with the title: Leo XIV: The Pope of Peace.

== Personal life ==
Englisch is married and has a son. He lives in the district Trastevere in Rome.

== Books ==
- Der stille Gott der Wölfe. (Roman), Stuttgart 1995, ISBN 978-3-522-71900-1
- Die Petrusakte. (Roman), Berlin 1998, ISBN 978-3-550-08266-5
- Johannes Paul II. – Das Geheimnis des Karol Wojtyła. (Biographie), Ullstein, München 2004, 2nd edition 2005 and Hockebooks, München 2020
- Johannes Paul II. Ein Leben in Bildern. Augsburg 2005, ISBN 978-3-89897-213-0
- Habemus Papam. Von Johannes Paul II. zu Benedikt XVI. München 2005, ISBN 978-3-570-00858-4
- Gottes Spuren, Die Wunder der katholischen Kirche. München 2006, ISBN 978-3-570-00855-3
- Wenn Gott spricht: Die Prophezeiungen der katholischen Kirche. München 2009, ISBN 978-3-570-01133-1
- Der Wunderpapst: Johannes Paul II. München 2011, ISBN 978-3-570-10066-0
- Benedikt XVI. Der deutsche Papst. München 2011, ISBN 978-3-570-10019-6
- Franziskus – Zeichen der Hoffnung. Das Erbe Benedikts XVI. und die Schicksalswahl des neuen Papstes. München 2013, ISBN 978-3-570-10186-5
- Der Kämpfer im Vatikan – Papst Franziskus und sein mutiger Weg. C. Bertelsmann Verlag, München 2015, ISBN 978-3-570-10279-4
- Franziskus – Ein Lebensbild. C. Bertelsmann Verlag, München 2016, ISBN 978-3-570-10325-8
- Mein Rom: Die Geheimnisse der Ewigen Stadt, München: C. Bertelsmann, 2018, ISBN 978-3-570-10359-3
- Der Pakt gegen den Papst. Franziskus und seine Feinde im Vatikan. C. Bertelsmann, München 2020, ISBN 978-3-570-10368-5
- Mein geheimes Rom: Die verborgenen Orte der Ewigen Stadt. C. Bertelsmann, München 2021, ISBN 978-3-570-10437-8
- Das Vermächtnis von Papst Franziskus: Wie der Kämpfer im Vatikan die katholische Kirche verändert hat. C. Bertelsmann, München 2023, ISBN 978-3-570-10514-6
- Leo XIV.: Der leise Mönch an der Spitze der Macht ("Leo XIV: The silent monk at the pinnacle of power"), C. Bertelsmann, 2025, ISBN 978-3-570-10563-4, later translated to english: Leo XIV: The Pope of Peace, Morehouse, 2026, ISBN 978-1-59627-357-3
