= Nikita Supranovich =

Belarusian footballer

Personal information
- Date of birth: 27 February 2001 (age 25)
- Place of birth: Vileyka, Minsk Oblast, Belarus
- Height: 1.89 m (6 ft 2 in)
- Position: Defender

Youth career
- 2018–2020: BATE Borisov

Senior career*
| Years | Team | Apps | (Gls) |
| 2020–2023 | BATE Borisov | 4 | (0) |
| 2022 | → Zenit-2 Saint Petersburg (loan) | 4 | (1) |
| 2022 | → Arsenal Dzerzhinsk (loan) | 14 | (0) |
| 2023 | → Belshina Bobruisk (loan) | 10 | (0) |
| 2023–2026 | Spartak Kostroma | 84 | (5) |

International career^{‡}
| 2019 | Belarus U19 | 1 | (0) |
| 2021–2022 | Belarus U21 | 8 | (1) |
- * Club domestic league appearances and goals as of 16 May 2026 ‡ National team caps and goals as of 29 March 2022

Nikita Supranovich (Belarusian: Мікіта Супрановіч; Russian: Никита Супранович; born 3 September 2000) is a Belarusian professional footballer.

== Career statistics ==
As of 16 May 2026

| Club | Season | League | | | Cup | | Continental | | Other | | Total | |
| Club | Season | Division | Apps | Goals | Apps | Goals | Apps | Goals | Apps | Goals | Apps | Goals |
|---|---|---|---|---|---|---|---|---|---|---|---|---|
| BATE Borisov | 2020 | Belarusian Premier League | 0 | 0 | 1 | 0 | 0 | 0 | — | | 1 | 0 |
| BATE Borisov | 2021 | Belarusian Premier League | 4 | 0 | 3 | 0 | — | | 0 | 0 | 7 | 0 |
| BATE Borisov | Total | | 4 | 0 | 4 | 0 | 0 | 0 | 0 | 0 | 8 | 0 |
| Zenit-2 Saint Petersburg (loan) | 2021–22 | Russian Second League | 4 | 1 | — | | — | | — | | 4 | 1 |
| Arsenal Dzerzhinsk (loan) | 2022 | Belarusian Premier League | 14 | 0 | 1 | 0 | — | | 2 (Note: Appearances in relegation play-offs) | 0 | 17 | 0 |
| Belshina Bobruisk (loan) | 2023 | Belarusian Premier League | 10 | 0 | 0 | 0 | — | | — | | 10 | 0 |
| Spartak Kostroma | 2023–24 | Russian Second League A | 28 | 2 | 0 | 0 | — | | — | | 28 | 2 |
| Spartak Kostroma | 2024–25 | Russian Second League A | 28 | 2 | 3 | 0 | — | | — | | 31 | 2 |
| Spartak Kostroma | 2025–26 | Russian First League | 28 | 1 | 1 | 0 | — | | — | | 29 | 1 |
| Spartak Kostroma | Total | | 84 | 5 | 4 | 0 | 0 | 0 | 0 | 0 | 88 | 5 |
| Career total | | | 116 | 6 | 9 | 0 | 0 | 0 | 2 | 0 | 127 | 6 |

== Honours ==
BATE Borisov

- Belarusian Cup winner: 2020–21
