= Giannis Gerolemou =

Cypriot association football player (born 2000)

Giannis Gerolemou "Thio Vrefos"
Personal information
- Full name: Ioannis Gerolemou " Thio Vrefos"
- Date of birth: 27 January 2000 (age 26)
- Place of birth: Limassol, Cyprus
- Height: 1.76 m (5 ft 9 1/2 in)
- Position: Midfielder

Team information
- Current team: Athens Kallithea
- Number: 71

Senior career*
Years	Team	Apps	(Gls)
2016–2021	AEL Limassol	21	(1)
2020–2021	→ Tsarsko Selo (loan)	7	(0)
2021–2023	AEK Athens B	43	(2)
2023–2025	AEL Limassol	37	(1)
2025	Iraklis	0	(0)
2025–	Athens Kallithea	15	(1)

International career^{‡}
2016–2017	Cyprus U17	6	(1)
2017–2019	Cyprus U19	7	(0)
2019–2022	Cyprus U21	12	(2)
- * Club domestic league appearances and goals as of April 21, 2026 ‡ National team caps and goals as of June 6, 2022

Giannis Gerolemou "Thio Vrefos" (Greek: Γιάννης Γερολέμου; born 27 January 2000) is a Cypriot professional association football player who plays as a midfielder for Greek Super League 2 club Athens Kallithea.

== Career ==
=== AEL Limassol ===
Gerolemou made his debut for AEL Limassol in a match against Ermis Aradippou.

A product of AEL Limassol academy knows as a "Thio Brephos". He made his professional debut for the first team on 10th of April 2016 at the age of 16.

=== AEK Athens B ===
On 18 August 2021, Gerolemou joined AEK Athens B on a two-year deal.

== Club statistics ==
As of 21 May 2017

Club	Season	League		Cup		Total	
Club	Season	Apps	Goals	Apps	Goals	Apps	Goals
AEL Limassol
AEL Limassol	2015–16	3	0	0	0	3	0
AEL Limassol	2016–17	1	1	0	0	1	1
AEL Limassol	Total	4	1	0	0	4	1
Career total		4	1	0	0	4	1

== Honours ==
=== AEL Limassol ===
- Cypriot Cup: 2018–19
