= Óskar Jónsson =

Icelandic middle-distance runner (1925–2016)

Óskar Gunnþór Jónsson (19 July 1925 – 19 January 2016) was an Icelandic middle-distance runner who competed in the 1948 Summer Olympics. He died on 19 January 2016, at the age of 90.
