= Hilbeck =

Coordinates: 51°35′N 7°52′E

Hilbeck is a village in the city of Werl, district of Soest in the German State of North Rhine-Westphalia. Hilbeck has around 1,300 inhabitants. The castle Haus Hilbeck is in Hilbeck.

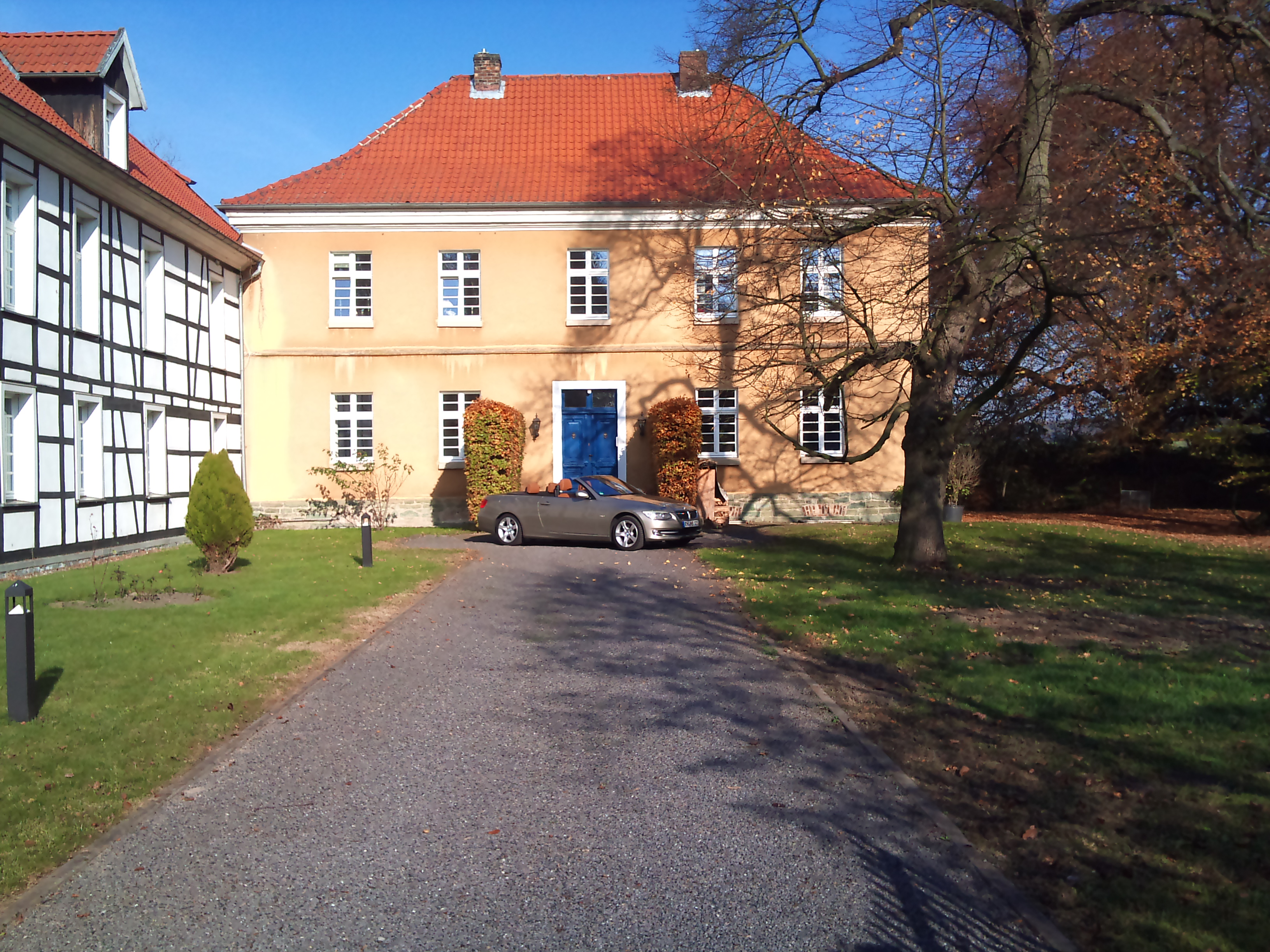
Haus Hilbeck
