= Yaroslav Oreshkevich =

Belarusian footballer

Personal information
- Date of birth: 8 September 2000 (age 26)
- Place of birth: Brest, Belarus
- Position: Midfielder

Team information
- Current team: Volna Pinsk
- Number: 97

Youth career
- 2016–2018: Dinamo Brest

Senior career*
Years	Team	Apps	(Gls)
2018–2022	Rukh Brest	42	(11)
2021–2022	→ Dinamo Brest (loan)	32	(4)
2022–2023	BATE Borisov	25	(1)
2023	Velež Mostar	0	(0)
2024	Dinamo Brest	27	(1)
2025	Arsenal Dzerzhinsk	8	(0)
2026–	Volna Pinsk	14	(0)

International career^{‡}
2017	Belarus U19	1	(0)
2021–2022	Belarus U21	11	(1)
- * Club domestic league appearances and goals as of 6 July 2026 ‡ National team caps and goals as of 8 June 2022

Yaroslav Oreshkevich (Belarusian: Яраслаў Арашкевіч; Russian: Ярослав Орешкевич; born 8 September 2000) is a Belarusian professional footballer who plays as a midfielder for Belarusian First League club Volna Pinsk.
