= Iceland men's national under-21 football team =

National youth association football team

Iceland Under-21
- Nickname: Strákarnir okkar
- Association: Knattspyrnusamband Íslands
- Confederation: UEFA (Europe)
- Head coach: Davíð Snorri Jónasson
- FIFA code: ISL
First colours	Second colours

UEFA U-21 Championship
- Appearances: 2 (first in 2011)
- Best result: Round 1 (2011, 2021)

The Iceland men's national under-21 football team is a national under-21 football team of Iceland and is controlled by the Football Association of Iceland. The team is considered to be the feeder team for the senior Icelandic men's national football team. Since the establishment of the UEFA European Under-21 Championship in 1978, the team has reached the Euro Championship finals on two occasions, most recently in 2021. In the 2011 and 2021 tournaments they were knocked out in the group stages.

The team is for Icelandic players aged under 21 at the start of the calendar year in which a two-year UEFA European Under-21 Championship campaign begins, so some players can remain with the squad until the age of 23. Players can represent Iceland at any level as long as they are eligible, giving them the option to compete for the U21s, senior team, and then U21s once more. This has been the case for several senior team players like Eiður Guðjohnsen, Heiðar Helguson, Jón Daði Böðvarsson and Jóhann Berg Guðmundsson.

== History ==
From 1978 to 2009 the team never qualified for the UEFA European Under-21 Championship tournament finals. In late 2010, the team sealed qualification to the championships for the very first team in their history. During the qualification stage they finished second in their group behind the Czech Republic and qualified for the playoffs as a result of being one of the best runners-up in the whole qualification process. Their most notable win came in a 4–1 home victory over Germany. In the next stage they played against Scotland in a two-legged affair in which they won 4–2 on aggregate over the two games.

Their remarkable qualification campaign saw them qualify for the finals where they were drawn against Belarus, Denmark and Switzerland in Group A. In their first two group games they were comfortably beaten by Belarus and Switzerland. In their final group game they defeated Denmark who were the hosts of the tournament 3–1. Iceland would finish third in the group, level on points with the second placed and fourth placed teams. Following the end of the tournament, UEFA announced its Team of the Tournament with striker Kolbeinn Sigþórsson named on the list.

Iceland qualified to the tournament for the second time in 2021.

== Competition records ==
=== UEFA European Under-21 Football Championship ===
Year	Round	Position	Pld	W	D	L	GF	GA	GD
1978 to 2009	did not qualify								
(Denmark) 2011	Group Stage	5th	3	1	0	2	3	5	–2
2013 to 2019	did not qualify								
(Hungary) (Slovenia) 2021	Group Stage	15th	3	0	0	3	1	8	–7
Total	0 Titles	0/2	6	1	0	5	4	13	–9

== UEFA European Under-21 Championship ==
=== 2023 UEFA European Under-21 Championship qualification ===
Pos	Team	Pld	W	D	L	GF	GA	GD	Pts	Qualification	Portugal	Iceland	Greece	Belarus	Cyprus	Liechtenstein
1	Portugal	10	9	1	0	41	3	+38	28	Final tournament	—	1–1	2–1	1–0	6–0	11–0
2	Iceland	10	5	3	2	25	7	+18	18	Play-offs	0–1	—	1–1	3–1	5–0	9–0
3	Greece	10	5	2	3	16	10	+6	17		0–4	1–0	—	2–0	0–0	4–0
4	Belarus	10	4	0	6	16	15	+1	12		1–5	1–2	0–2	—	2–0	6–0
5	Cyprus	10	3	2	5	16	16	0	11		0–1	1–1	3–0	0–1	—	6–0
6	Liechtenstein	10	0	0	10	0	63	−63	0		0–9	0–3	0–5	0–4	0–6	—

Source: UEFA
Rules for classification: Tiebreakers

==== 2023 UEFA European Under-21 Championship play-offs ====
The four play-off winners qualify for the final tournament.

All times are CEST (UTC+2), as listed by UEFA (local times, if different, are in parentheses).

Team 1	Agg.	Team 2	1st leg	2nd leg
Croatia	3–3 (5–4 p)	Denmark	2–1	1–2 (a.e.t.)
Slovakia	3–5	Ukraine	3–2	0–3
Republic of Ireland	1–1 (1–3 p)	Israel	1–1	0–0 (a.e.t.)
Iceland	1–2	Czech Republic	1–2	0–0

== Recent results and forthcoming fixtures ==
Date	Competition	Location	Opponent	Result	Scorers

== Players ==
=== Current squad ===
The following players were called up for the 2027 UEFA European Under-21 Championship qualification Group C matches against Faroe Islands and Estonia on 4 and 8 September; respectively.

Caps and goals updated as of 8 September 2025, after the match against Estonia. Names in bold denote players who have been capped for the senior team.

No.	Pos.	Player	Date of birth (age)	Caps	Goals	Club
1	GK	Lúkas Petersson	9 February 2004 (age 22)	12	0	(German Football Association) TSG 1899 Hoffenheim
12	GK	Halldór Snær Georgsson	5 January 2004 (age 22)	4	0	(Football Association of Iceland) KR
2	DF	Ásgeir Helgi Orrason	19 May 2005 (age 21)	2	0	(Football Association of Iceland) Breiðablik
3	DF	Júlíus Mar Júlíusson	7 June 2004 (age 22)	3	0	(Football Association of Iceland) KR
5	DF	**Hlynur Freyr Karlsson**	6 April 2004 (age 22)	15	0	(Swedish Football Association) Brommapojkarna
23	DF	Nóel Atli Arnórsson	30 September 2006 (age 20)	2	0	(Danish Football Association) AaB
4	MF	**Logi Hrafn Róbertsson**	22 July 2004 (age 22)	19	0	(Croatian Football Federation) Istra
6	MF	Baldur Kári Helgason	8 February 2005 (age 21)	5	0	(Football Association of Iceland) FH
7	MF	Ágúst Orri Þorsteinsson	14 January 2005 (age 21)	7	0	(Football Association of Iceland) Breiðablik
8	MF	Guðmundur Baldvin Nökkvason	27 April 2004 (age 22)	7	0	(Football Association of Iceland) Stjarnan
10	MF	**Eggert Aron Guðmundsson**	8 February 2004 (age 22)	13	1	(Norwegian Football Federation) Brann
14	MF	Helgi Fróði Ingason	6 December 2005 (age 20)	7	0	(Royal Dutch Football Association) Helmond Sport
17	MF	Jóhannes Kristinn Bjarnason	24 February 2005 (age 21)	7	1	(Danish Football Association) Kolding IF
18	MF	Kjartan Már Kjartansson	14 July 2006 (age 20)	3	0	(Scottish Football Association) Aberdeen
19	MF	Róbert Frosti Þorkelsson	18 August 2005 (age 21)	7	0	(Swedish Football Association) GAIS
21	MF	Tómas Orri Róbertsson	21 April 2004 (age 22)	3	0	(Football Association of Iceland) FH
9	FW	Benoný Breki Andrésson	3 August 2005 (age 21)	12	4	(The Football Association) Stockport County
11	FW	Hilmir Rafn Mikaelsson	2 February 2004 (age 22)	15	4	(Norwegian Football Federation) Viking
20	FW	Hinrik Harðarson	19 June 2004 (age 22)	6	1	(Norwegian Football Federation) Odd
22	FW	Galdur Guðmundsson	14 April 2006 (age 20)	2	0	(Football Association of Iceland) KR

=== Recent call-ups ===
The following players are still eligible for and have previously been called up to the under-21 squad.

Pos.	Player	Date of birth (age)	Caps	Goals	Club	Latest call-up

=== Previous squads ===
- 2011 UEFA European Under-21 Football Championship squad
- 2021 UEFA European Under-21 Football Championship squad

== Records ==
=== Most caps ===
As of 17 November 2022, the 10 players with the most U-21 caps for Iceland are:

Rank	Name	Career	Caps	Goals
1	Alfons Sampsted	2017–2020	30	1
2	Hólmar Örn Eyjólfsson	2007–2012	27	2
3	Bjarni Viðarsson	2005–2011	26	6
4	Birkir Bjarnason	2006–2011	25	3
5	Brynjólfur Andersen Willumsson	2019–2022	25	5
6	Jón Dagur Þorsteinsson	2017–2021	23	5
7	Orri Sigurður Ómarsson	2013–2016	21	0
7	Alex Þór Hauksson	2017–2021	21	1
9	Ari Leifsson	2017–2021	20	1
10	Pétur Marteinsson	1992–1995	19	0
10	Bjarni Guðjónsson	1996–2001	19	4
10	Ómar Jóhannsson	2000–2003	19	0
10	Rúrik Gíslason	2005–2011	19	6
10	Haraldur Björnsson	2007–2011	19	0
10	Willum Þór Willumsson	2018–2021	19	3
10	Kolbeinn Þórðarson	2019–2022	19	1

In bold players still playing or available for selection.

=== Top goalscorers ===
As of 17 November 2022, the 10 players with the most U-21 goals for Iceland are:

Rank	Name	Career	Goals	Caps	GPG
1	Emil Atlason	2012–2014	8	12	0.67
2	Hannes Sigurðsson	2002–2005	7	14	0.5
2	Sveinn Aron Guðjohnsen	2018–2021	7	17	0.41
4	**Kristian Hlynsson**	2021–	6	10	0.6
4	**Kristall Máni Ingason**	2021–	6	10	0.6
4	Gylfi Sigurðsson	2007–2011	6	14	0.43
4	Jóhann Berg Guðmundsson	2008–2011	6	14	0.43
4	Albert Guðmundsson	2015–2018	6	15	0.4
4	Rúrik Gíslason	2005–2011	6	19	0.32
4	Bjarni Viðarsson	2005–2011	6	26	0.23

In bold players still playing or available for selection.

== See also ==
- Iceland men's national football team
- Iceland men's national under-19 football team
- Iceland men's national under-17 football team
- Iceland women's national football team
