= Vladislav Lozhkin =

Belarusian footballer

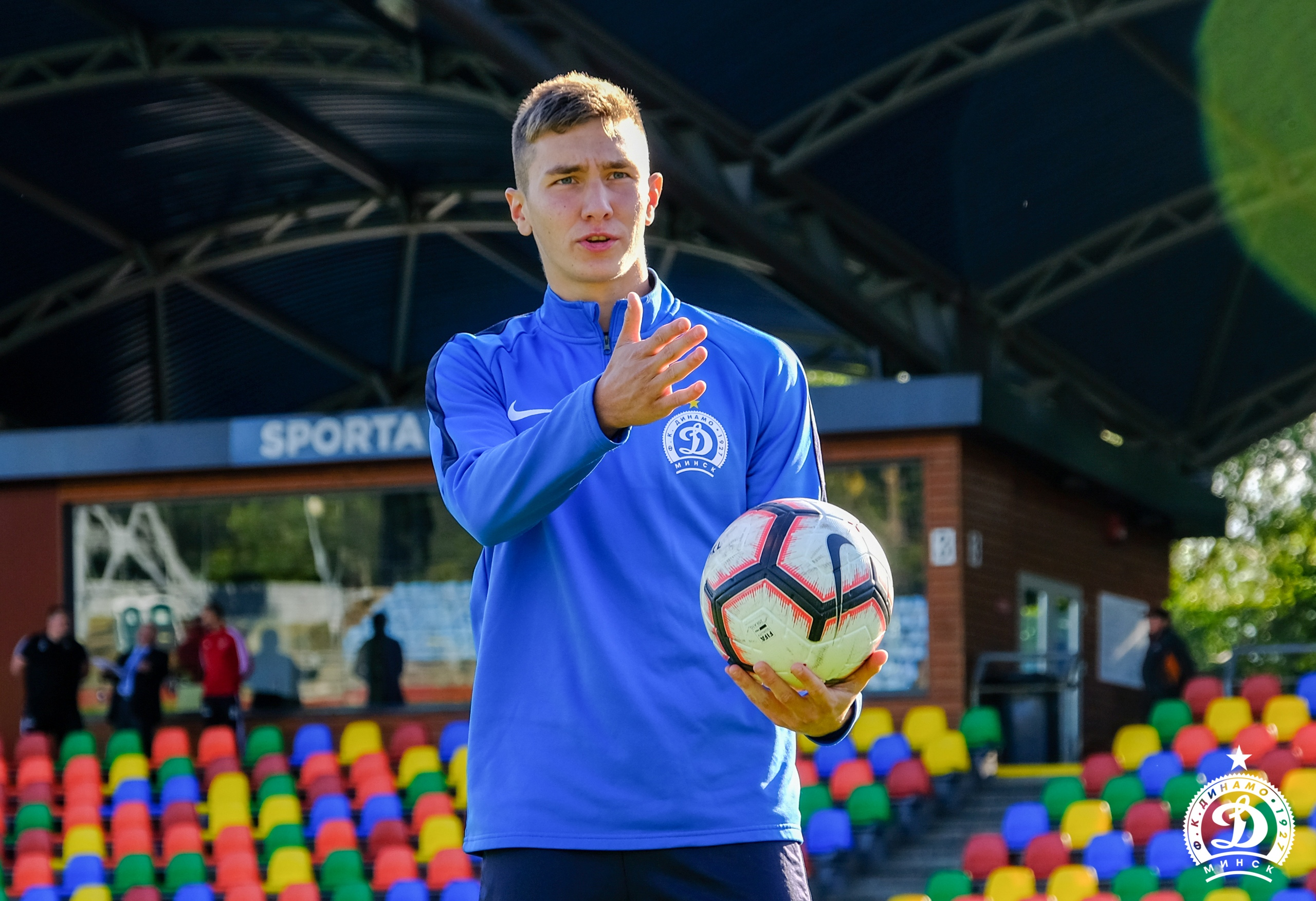
- Lozhkin in 2019

Personal information
- Date of birth: 25 March 2002 (age 24)
- Place of birth: Mogilev, Belarus
- Height: 1.81 m (5 ft 11 in)
- Position: Forward

Team information
- Current team: Dynamo Brest
- Number: 25

Youth career
- 2016–2019: Dinamo Minsk

Senior career*
Years	Team	Apps	(Gls)
2019–2022	Dinamo Minsk	54	(10)
2020	→ Smolevichi (loan)	10	(3)
2023	Turan	26	(20)
2024	Slavia Mozyr	14	(3)
2024–2025	Ufa	31	(5)
2025	Chernomorets Novorossiysk	14	(0)
2026–	Dynamo Brest	13	(5)

International career^{‡}
2019	Belarus U17	3	(0)
2019	Belarus U19	3	(1)
2020–2023	Belarus U21	22	(4)
- * Club domestic league appearances and goals as of 6 July 2026 ‡ National team caps and goals as of 20 November 2023

Vladislav Lozhkin (Belarusian: Уладзіслаў Ложкін; Russian: Владислав Ложкин; born 25 March 2002) is a Belarusian professional footballer who plays for Dynamo Brest.
