= Ágúst Hlynsson =

Icelandic footballer (born 2000)

Personal information
- Full name: Ágúst Eðvald Hlynsson
- Date of birth: 28 March 2000 (age 26)
- Place of birth: Akureyri, Iceland
- Position: Midfielder

Team information
- Current team: Þór Akureyri
- Number: 22

Youth career
- –2011: Þór
- 2011–2017: Breiðablik
- 2017: Norwich City
- 2017–2019: Brøndby

Senior career*
Years	Team	Apps	(Gls)
2016	Breiðablik	4	(0)
2019–2020	Víkingur Reykjavík	39	(8)
2020–2022	Horsens	12	(0)
2021	→ FH (loan)	10	(4)
2022	→ Valur (loan)	26	(2)
2023	Breiðablik	25	(5)
2024–2025	AB	45	(5)
2025	Vestri	12	(4)
2026–	Þór Akureyri	26	(5)

International career
2016	Iceland U16	9	(2)
2015–2016	Iceland U17	6	(1)
2017	Iceland U18	4	(1)
2018	Iceland U19	5	(0)
2019–2022	Iceland U21	11	(1)
- * Club domestic league appearances and goals as of 16 November 2026

Ágúst Eðvald Hlynsson (born 28 March 2000) is an Icelandic football midfielder for Þór Akureyri.

== Club career ==
Ágúst started his career with Breiðablik before transferring to Norwich City in January 2017. Ágúst then transferred to Brøndby on 31 August 2017. He left Brøndby in April 2019 to join Víkingur Reykjavík.

Ágúst joined AC Horsens in October 2020. After three years back at Iceland, Ágúst joined Danish 2nd Division side Akademisk Boldklub.

On 26 July 2025, it was confirmed that Ágúst had exercised a release clause in his contract, thereby leaving AB to return home to Iceland, where he would play for Vestri. On 22 August 2025, he won the Icelandic Cup after Vestri defeated Valur in the Icelandic Cup final, 1–0.

== International career ==
Ágúst has featured for the under-16, under-17, under-18, under-19 and under-21 Icelandic youth national teams.

== Personal life ==
Ágúst is the older brother of Ajax player Kristian Hlynsson.
