= 2021–22 in Polish football =

Football in Poland
- Season: 2021–22

Men's football
- Ekstraklasa: Lech Poznań
- I liga: Miedź Legnica
- II liga: Stal Rzeszów
- Polish Cup: Raków Częstochowa
- Polish Super Cup: Raków Częstochowa

2021–22 in Polish football
- Teams in Europe
- Legia Warsaw; Raków Częstochowa; Pogoń Szczecin; Śląsk Wrocław
- Poland national team
- 2022 FIFA World Cup qualification

The 2021–22 season is the 97th season of competitive football in Poland.

== Men's football ==
=== League competitions ===
==== Ekstraklasa ====
Pos	Team	Pld	W	D	L	GF	GA	GD	Pts	Qualification or relegation
1	Lech Poznań (C)	34	22	8	4	67	24	+43	74	Qualification for the Champions League first qualifying round
2	Raków Częstochowa	34	20	9	5	60	30	+30	69	Qualification for the Europa Conference League second qualifying round
3	Pogoń Szczecin	34	18	11	5	63	31	+32	65	Qualification for the Europa Conference League first qualifying round (Note: Since the winners of the 2021–22 Polish Cup, Raków Częstochowa, qualified for the Europa Conference League based on league position, the second Europa Conference League first qualifying round berth was transferred to the 4th-placed team.)
4	Lechia Gdańsk	34	16	9	9	52	39	+13	57	Qualification for the Europa Conference League first qualifying round
5	Piast Gliwice	34	15	9	10	45	37	+8	54	
6	Wisła Płock	34	15	3	16	48	51	−3	48	
7	Radomiak Radom	34	11	15	8	42	40	+2	48	
8	Górnik Zabrze	34	13	8	13	55	55	0	47	
9	Cracovia	34	12	10	12	40	42	−2	46	
10	Legia Warsaw	34	13	4	17	46	48	−2	43	
11	Warta Poznań	34	11	9	14	35	38	−3	42	
12	Jagiellonia Białystok	34	9	13	12	39	50	−11	40	
13	Zagłębie Lubin	34	11	5	18	43	59	−16	38	
14	Stal Mielec	34	9	10	15	39	52	−13	37	
15	Śląsk Wrocław	34	7	14	13	42	52	−10	35	
16	Bruk-Bet Termalica Nieciecza (R)	34	7	11	16	36	56	−20	32	Relegation to I liga
17	Wisła Kraków (R)	34	7	10	17	37	54	−17	31	Relegation to I liga
18	Górnik Łęczna (R)	34	6	10	18	29	60	−31	28	Relegation to I liga

Source: ekstraklasa.org
Rules for classification: 1) Points; 2) Head-to-head points; 3) Head-to-head goal difference; 4) Goal difference; 5) Goals scored; 6) Number of wins; 7) Number of away wins; 8) Lower number of points based on yellow and red cards (red card = 3 points, yellow card = 1 point, sending-off = 3 points - including 1 point for first yellow card); 9) Fairplay ranking; 10) Draw. (Note: Head-to-head record is used only after all the matches between the teams in question have been played)
(C) Champions; (R) Relegated

==== I liga ====
Pos	Team	Pld	W	D	L	GF	GA	GD	Pts	Promotion or Relegation
1	Miedź Legnica (C, P)	34	23	8	3	56	22	+34	77	Promotion to Ekstraklasa
2	Widzew Łódź (P)	34	18	8	8	53	38	+15	62	Promotion to Ekstraklasa
3	Arka Gdynia	34	19	4	11	62	39	+23	61	Qualification for Promotion play-offs
4	Korona Kielce (O, P)	34	15	11	8	46	37	+9	56	Qualification for Promotion play-offs
5	Odra Opole	34	14	9	11	51	46	+5	51	Qualification for Promotion play-offs
6	Chrobry Głogów	34	13	11	10	43	34	+9	50	Qualification for Promotion play-offs
7	Sandecja Nowy Sącz	34	12	11	11	39	36	+3	47	
8	GKS Katowice	34	11	13	10	44	47	−3	46	
9	Podbeskidzie Bielsko-Biała	34	11	12	11	48	41	+7	45	
10	ŁKS Łódź	34	12	9	13	33	37	−4	45	
11	Resovia Rzeszów	34	11	11	12	42	39	+3	44	
12	GKS Tychy	34	11	11	12	37	41	−4	44	
13	Skra Częstochowa	34	8	14	12	28	41	−13	38	
14	Puszcza Niepołomice	34	10	7	17	41	50	−9	37	
15	Zagłębie Sosnowiec	34	8	12	14	41	48	−7	36	
16	Stomil Olsztyn (R)	34	10	5	19	32	52	−20	35	Relegation to II liga
17	Górnik Polkowice (R)	34	5	14	15	32	54	−22	29	Relegation to II liga
18	GKS Jastrzębie (R)	34	5	10	19	32	58	−26	25	Relegation to II liga

Source: 1liga.org, 90minut.pl
Rules for classification: 1) Points; 2) Head-to-head points; 3) Head-to-head goal difference; 4) Goal difference; 6) Goals scored; 7) Number of wins; 8) Number of away wins. (Note: Head-to-head record is used only after all the matches between the teams in question have been played)
(C) Champions; (O) Play-off winner; (P) Promoted; (R) Relegated

==== II liga ====
Pos	Team	Pld	W	D	L	GF	GA	GD	Pts	Promotion or Relegation
1	Stal Rzeszów (C, P)	34	23	8	3	75	35	+40	77	Promotion to I liga
2	Chojniczanka Chojnice (P)	34	23	4	7	72	31	+41	73	Promotion to I liga
3	Ruch Chorzów (O, P)	34	17	12	5	48	27	+21	63	Qualification for Promotion play-offs
4	Wigry Suwałki (Note: Wigry Suwałki withdrew from the league at the end of the season, as a result Hutnik Kraków avoided relegation.) (R)	34	18	6	10	58	38	+20	60	Relegation to IV liga
5	Motor Lublin	34	16	11	7	54	31	+23	59	Qualification for Promotion play-offs
6	Radunia Stężyca	34	16	5	13	60	51	+9	53	Qualification for Promotion play-offs
7	Lech Poznań II	34	15	7	12	41	45	−4	52	
8	Garbarnia Kraków	34	13	9	12	51	43	+8	48	
9	Olimpia Elbląg	34	12	10	12	33	32	+1	46 (Note: Ranked on head-to-head points: Olimpia Elbląg 4, Pogoń Siedlce 1.)	
10	Pogoń Siedlce	34	13	7	14	47	55	−8	46	
11	Wisła Puławy	34	12	8	14	56	54	+2	44	
12	Śląsk Wrocław II	34	12	7	15	51	53	−2	43	
13	KKS Kalisz	34	13	3	18	43	48	−5	42	
14	Znicz Pruszków	34	9	12	13	38	45	−7	39	
15	Hutnik Kraków	34	10	5	19	38	55	−17	35	
16	Pogoń Grodzisk Mazowiecki (R)	34	8	7	19	34	54	−20	31	Relegation to III liga
17	Sokół Ostróda (R)	34	4	7	23	32	77	−45	19	Relegation to III liga
18	GKS Bełchatów (Note: GKS Bełchatów was punished with a deduction of 4 points for a licensing process violation. GKS Bełchatów withdrew from the league on 11 March 2022.) (W)	34	6	4	24	17	74	−57	18	Have withdrawn from the league

Source: 90minut.pl
Rules for classification: 1) Points; 2) Head-to-head points; 3) Head-to-head goal difference; 4) Goal difference; 6) Goals scored; 7) Number of wins; 8) Number of away wins. (Note: Head-to-head record is used only after all the matches between the teams in question have been played)
(C) Champions; (O) Play-off winner; (P) Promoted; (R) Relegated; (W) Withdrawn

==== III liga ====
===== Group 1 =====
Pos	Team	Pld	W	D	L	GF	GA	GD	Pts	Promotion
1	Polonia Warsaw (C, P)	36	26	3	7	80	27	+53	81	Promotion to II liga
2	Legionovia Legionowo	36	24	8	4	76	39	+37	80	
3	Świt Nowy Dwór Mazowiecki	36	17	8	11	58	46	+12	59	
4	Legia Warsaw II	36	16	10	10	77	55	+22	58	
5	Błonianka Błonie	36	17	6	13	61	62	−1	57	
6	Lechia Tomaszów Mazowiecki	36	16	8	12	63	48	+15	56	
7	ŁKS Łódź II	36	15	9	12	63	52	+11	54	
8	Ursus Warsaw	36	15	8	13	53	63	−10	53	
9	Jagiellonia Białystok II	36	16	4	16	66	58	+8	52	
10	Broń Radom	36	15	6	15	48	55	−7	51	
11	Unia Skierniewice	36	15	4	17	60	58	+2	49	
12	Pelikan Łowicz	36	12	10	14	57	46	+11	46	
13	Pilica Białobrzegi	36	13	6	17	57	72	−15	45	
14	KS Kutno (R)	36	11	10	15	47	61	−14	43	Relegation to IV liga
15	Mamry Giżycko (R)	36	13	3	20	40	66	−26	42	Relegation to IV liga
16	GKS Wikielec (R)	36	10	12	14	42	53	−11	42	Relegation to IV liga
17	Znicz Biała Piska (R)	36	12	6	18	55	69	−14	42	Relegation to IV liga
18	Sokół Aleksandrów Łódzki (R)	36	5	10	21	36	64	−28	25	Relegation to IV liga
19	Wissa Szczuczyn (R)	36	4	9	23	28	73	−45	21	Relegation to IV liga

Source: 90minut.pl
Rules for classification: 1. Number of points reached in the entire series of games; 2. Number of points reached in direct matches; 3. Goal difference in direct matches; 4. Goal difference in direct matches – away goals counted twice; 5. Goal difference in the whole series of games; 6. Number of goals scored in the entire series of games.
(C) Champions; (P) Promoted; (R) Relegated

===== Group 2 =====
Pos	Team	Pld	W	D	L	GF	GA	GD	Pts	Promotion
1	Kotwica Kołobrzeg (C, P)	34	24	6	4	75	25	+50	78	Promotion to II liga
2	Olimpia Grudziądz	34	24	5	5	77	24	+53	77	
3	Unia Janikowo	34	18	6	10	62	47	+15	60	
4	Pogoń Szczecin II	34	16	10	8	60	36	+24	58	
5	Pogoń Nowe Skalmierzyce	34	17	7	10	54	42	+12	58	
6	Sokół Kleczew	34	17	5	12	53	39	+14	56	
7	Świt Szczecin	34	16	8	10	56	37	+19	56	
8	Zawisza Bydgoszcz	34	14	8	12	57	51	+6	50	
9	Błękitni Stargard	34	13	6	15	48	54	−6	45	
10	Polonia Środa Wielkopolska	34	12	7	15	40	63	−23	43	
11	KP Starogard Gdański	34	11	9	14	44	51	−7	42	
12	Stolem Gniewino	34	10	11	13	43	66	−23	41	
13	Jarota Jarocin	34	9	9	16	40	47	−7	36	
14	Bałtyk Gdynia	34	10	6	18	44	57	−13	36	
15	GKS Przodkowo	34	9	9	16	40	51	−11	36	
16	Bałtyk Koszalin (R)	34	9	8	17	40	58	−18	35	Relegation to IV liga
17	Kluczevia Kluczewo (R)	34	7	5	22	28	65	−37	26	Relegation to IV liga
18	Elana Toruń (Note: Elana Toruń withdrawn the league after the first half of the season. They relegated to IV liga replacing their reserve team.) (W)	34	6	3	25	36	84	−48	21	Withdrawal

Source: 90minut.pl
Rules for classification: 1. Number of points reached in the entire series of games; 2. Number of points reached in direct matches; 3. Goal difference in direct matches; 4. Goal difference in direct matches – away goals counted twice; 5. Goal difference in the whole series of games; 6. Number of goals scored in the entire series of games.
(C) Champions; (P) Promoted; (R) Relegated; (W) Withdrawn

===== Group 3 =====
Pos	Team	Pld	W	D	L	GF	GA	GD	Pts	Promotion
1	Zagłębie Lubin II (C, P)	34	23	8	3	86	42	+44	77	Promotion to II liga
2	Ślęza Wrocław	34	20	9	5	83	37	+46	69	
3	Polonia Bytom	34	20	5	9	66	34	+32	65	
4	Rekord Bielsko-Biała	34	18	8	8	70	43	+27	62	
5	LKS Goczałkowice-Zdrój	34	15	9	10	47	41	+6	54	
6	Miedź Legnica II	34	15	7	12	56	63	−7	52	
7	Górnik Zabrze II	34	15	6	13	49	49	0	51	
8	Pniówek Pawłowice	34	12	11	11	55	55	0	47	
9	Stal Brzeg	34	14	4	16	51	47	+4	46	
10	Lechia Zielona Góra	34	12	9	13	49	44	+5	45	
11	Odra Wodzisław Śląski	34	12	7	15	47	63	−16	43	
12	MKS Kluczbork	34	12	7	15	55	57	−2	43	
13	Gwarek Tarnowskie Góry	34	9	12	13	44	50	−6	39	
14	Carina Gubin	34	11	6	17	40	49	−9	39	
15	Warta Gorzów Wielkopolski	34	9	9	16	41	54	−13	36	
16	Piast Żmigród (R)	34	10	6	18	46	76	−30	36	Relegation to IV liga
17	Karkonosze Jelenia Góra (R)	34	9	3	22	40	69	−29	30	Relegation to IV liga
18	Foto-Higiena Gać (R)	34	4	6	24	29	81	−52	18	Relegation to IV liga

Source: 90minut.pl
Rules for classification: 1. Number of points reached in the entire series of games; 2. Number of points reached in direct matches; 3. Goal difference in direct matches; 4. Goal difference in direct matches – away goals counted twice; 5. Goal difference in the whole series of games; 6. Number of goals scored in the entire series of games.
(C) Champions; (P) Promoted; (R) Relegated

===== Group 4 =====
Pos	Team	Pld	W	D	L	GF	GA	GD	Pts	Promotion
1	Siarka Tarnobrzeg (C, P)	34	22	6	6	68	29	+39	72	Promotion to II liga
2	Chełmianka Chełm	34	20	6	8	55	31	+24	66	
3	ŁKS Łagów	34	20	6	8	59	31	+28	66	
4	Avia Świdnik	34	20	5	9	67	32	+35	65	
5	Podhale Nowy Targ	34	17	8	9	65	44	+21	59	
6	Cracovia II	34	17	7	10	67	38	+29	58	
7	Stal Stalowa Wola	34	15	6	13	48	38	+10	51	
8	KSZO Ostrowiec Świętokrzyski	34	14	9	11	41	39	+2	51	
9	Unia Tarnów	34	12	12	10	50	48	+2	48	
10	Wisłoka Dębica	34	12	12	10	51	59	−8	48	
11	Orlęta Radzyń Podlaski	34	12	10	12	55	52	+3	46	
12	Czarni Połaniec	34	11	8	15	47	63	−16	41	
13	Sokół Sieniawa	34	11	8	15	38	62	−24	41	
14	Podlasie Biała Podlaska	34	9	12	13	41	49	−8	39	
15	Wisła Sandomierz	34	8	6	20	42	68	−26	30	
16	Korona Rzeszów (R)	34	7	8	19	42	74	−32	29	Relegation to IV liga
17	Tomasovia Tomaszów Lubelski (R)	32	5	4	23	37	69	−32	19	Relegation to IV liga
18	Wólczanka Wólka Pełkińska (R)	34	4	5	25	30	77	−47	17	Relegation to IV liga

Updated to match(es) played on 5 December 2020. Source: 90minut.pl
Rules for classification: 1. Number of points reached in the entire series of games; 2. Number of points reached in direct matches; 3. Goal difference in direct matches; 4. Goal difference in direct matches – away goals counted twice; 5. Goal difference in the whole series of games; 6. Number of goals scored in the entire series of games.
(C) Champions; (P) Promoted; (R) Relegated

=== Cup competitions ===
==== Polish Cup ====
2 May 2022
16:00 CEST (UTC+02:00)

Lech Poznań	1–3	Raków Częstochowa
Amaral 52'	Report	Gutkovskis 6'; Wdowiak 36'; Ivi 77'

Stadion Narodowy, Warsaw
Attendance: 35,694
Referee: Szymon Marciniak (Płock)

==== Polish Super Cup ====
17 July 2021
20:00 CEST (UTC+02:00)

Legia Warsaw	1–1	Raków Częstochowa
Emreli 90+3'	Report	Tudor 10'
Penalties
Pekhart (penalty scored); Kapustka (penalty missed); Emreli (penalty missed); Juranović (penalty scored); Mladenović (penalty scored)	3–4	(penalty scored) Petrášek; (penalty scored) Ivi López; (penalty missed) Arsenić; (penalty scored) Arak; (penalty scored) Rundić

Stadion Wojska Polskiego, Warsaw
Attendance: 10,870
Referee: Damian Sylwestrzak (Wrocław)

== UEFA competitions ==
=== UEFA Champions League ===
==== Qualifying phase and play-off round ====
===== First qualifying round =====
Team 1	Agg.	Team 2	1st leg	2nd leg
Bodø/Glimt (Norway)	2–5	(Poland) Legia Warsaw	2–3	0–2

===== Second qualifying round =====
Team 1	Agg.	Team 2	1st leg	2nd leg
Legia Warsaw (Poland)	3–1	(Estonia) Flora	2–1	1–0

===== Third qualifying round =====
Team 1	Agg.	Team 2	1st leg	2nd leg
Dinamo Zagreb (Croatia)	2–1	(Poland) Legia Warsaw	1–1	1–0

=== UEFA Europa League ===
==== Qualifying phase and play-off round ====
===== Play-off round =====
Team 1	Agg.	Team 2	1st leg	2nd leg
Slavia Prague (Czech Republic)	3–4	(Poland) Legia Warsaw	2–2	1–2

==== Group stage ====
===== Group C =====
Pos	Team	Pld	W	D	L	GF	GA	GD	Pts	Qualification	SPM	NAP	LEI	LEG
1	(Russia) Spartak Moscow	6	3	1	2	10	9	+1	10 (Note: Head–to–head points: Spartak Moscow 6, Napoli 0.)	Advance to round of 16	—	2–1	3–4	0–1
2	(Italy) Napoli	6	3	1	2	15	10	+5	10	Advance to knockout round play-offs	2–3	—	3–2	3–0
3	(England) Leicester City	6	2	2	2	12	11	+1	8	Transfer to Europa Conference League	1–1	2–2	—	3–1
4	(Poland) Legia Warsaw	6	2	0	4	4	11	−7	6		0–1	1–4	1–0	—

Source: UEFA

=== UEFA Europa Conference League ===
==== Qualifying phase and play-off round ====
===== First qualifying round =====
Team 1	Agg.	Team 2	1st leg	2nd leg
Paide Linnameeskond (Estonia)	1–4	(Poland) Śląsk Wrocław	1–2	0–2

===== Second qualifying round =====
Team 1	Agg.	Team 2	1st leg	2nd leg
Ararat Yerevan (Armenia)	5–7	(Poland) Śląsk Wrocław	2–4	3–3
Pogoń Szczecin (Poland)	0–1	(Croatia) Osijek	0–0	0–1
Sūduva (Lithuania)	0–0 (3–4 p)	(Poland) Raków Częstochowa	0–0	0–0 (a.e.t.)

===== Third qualifying round =====
Team 1	Agg.	Team 2	1st leg	2nd leg
Śląsk Wrocław (Poland)	2–5	(Israel) Hapoel Be'er Sheva	2–1	0–4
Raków Częstochowa (Poland)	1–0	(Russia) Rubin Kazan	0–0	1–0 (a.e.t.)

===== Play-off round =====
Team 1	Agg.	Team 2	1st leg	2nd leg
Raków Częstochowa (Poland)	1–3	(Belgium) Gent	1–0	0–3

=== UEFA Youth League ===
==== Domestic Champions Path ====
===== First round =====
Team 1	Agg.	Team 2	1st leg	2nd leg
Pogoń Szczecin (Poland)	3–4	(Spain) Deportivo La Coruña	3–0	0–4

=== UEFA Women's Champions League ===
==== Qualifying rounds ====
===== Round 1 =====
Hosted by Czarni Sosnowiec.

Semi-finals
17 August
(Hungary) Ferencváros	2
(Poland) Czarni Sosnowiec	1

Final
20 August
(Albania) Vllaznia (a.e.t.) (p)	0 (3)
(Hungary) Ferencváros	0 (1)

== National team ==
=== Poland national football team ===
==== 2022 FIFA World Cup qualification ====
===== Group I =====
Pos	Team	Pld	W	D	L	GF	GA	GD	Pts	Qualification	England	Poland	Albania	Hungary	Andorra	San Marino
1	England	10	8	2	0	39	3	+36	26	Qualification for 2022 FIFA World Cup	—	2–1	5–0	1–1	4–0	5–0
2	Poland	10	6	2	2	30	11	+19	20	Advance to play-offs	1–1	—	4–1	1–2	3–0	5–0
3	Albania	10	6	0	4	12	12	0	18		0–2	0–1	—	1–0	1–0	5–0
4	Hungary	10	5	2	3	19	13	+6	17		0–4	3–3	0–1	—	2–1	4–0
5	Andorra	10	2	0	8	8	24	−16	6		0–5	1–4	0–1	1–4	—	2–0
6	San Marino	10	0	0	10	1	46	−45	0		0–10	1–7	0–2	0–3	0–3	—

Source: FIFA, UEFA
Rules for classification: Tiebreakers

2 September 2021	Poland	4–1	Albania	PGE Narodowy, Warsaw
20:45	Lewandowski 12'; Buksa 44'; Krychowiak 54'; Linetty 89'	Report (FIFA); Report (UEFA)	Cikalleshi 25'	Attendance: 38,254; Referee: Maurizio Mariani (Italy)

5 September 2021	San Marino	1–7	Poland	San Marino Stadium, Serravalle
20:45	Nanni 48'	Report (FIFA); Report (UEFA)	Lewandowski 4', 21'; Świderski 16'; Linetty 44'; Buksa 67', 90+2', 90+4'	Attendance: 500; Referee: Mattias Gestranius (Finland)

8 September 2021	Poland	1–1	England	PGE Narodowy, Warsaw
20:45	Szymański 90+2'	Report (FIFA); Report (UEFA)	Kane 72'	Attendance: 56,212; Referee: Daniel Siebert (Germany)

9 October 2021	Poland	5–0	San Marino	PGE Narodowy, Warsaw
20:45	Świderski 10'; Brolli 20' (o.g.); Kędziora 50'; Buksa 84'; Piątek 90+1'	Report (FIFA); Report (UEFA)		Attendance: 56,128; Referee: Fran Jović (Croatia)

12 October 2021	Albania	0–1	Poland	Arena Kombëtare, Tirana
20:45		Report (FIFA); Report (UEFA)	Świderski 77'	Attendance: 21,000; Referee: Clément Turpin (France)

12 November 2021	Andorra	1–4	Poland	Estadi Nacional, Andorra la Vella
20:45	Vales 45'	Report (FIFA); Report (UEFA)	Lewandowski 5', 73'; Jóźwiak 11'; Milik 45+2'	Attendance: 1,049; Referee: John Beaton (Scotland)

15 November 2021	Poland	1–2	Hungary	PGE Narodowy, Warsaw
20:45	Świderski 61'	Report (FIFA); Report (UEFA)	Schäfer 37'; Gazdag 80'	Attendance: 56,197; Referee: Tiago Martins (Portugal)

===== Second round =====
====== Path B ======
24 March 2022 Semi-final	Russia	v	Poland	Luzhniki Stadium, Moscow
18:00 (20:00 UTC+3)		Report (FIFA); Report (UEFA)

=== Poland national under-21 football team ===
==== 2023 UEFA European Under-21 Championship ====
===== Qualification =====
====== Group B ======
Pos	Team	Pld	W	D	L	GF	GA	GD	Pts	Qualification	Germany	Israel	Poland	Hungary	Latvia	San Marino
1	Germany	10	9	0	1	32	9	+23	27	Final tournament	—	3–2	0–4	4–0	4–0	4–0
2	Israel	10	6	1	3	19	10	+9	19	Play-offs	0–1	—	2–2	3–0	2–1	2–0
3	Poland	10	5	3	2	26	9	+17	18		1–2	1–2	—	1–1	5–0	3–0
4	Hungary	10	4	2	4	16	17	−1	14		1–5	1–2	2–2	—	1–0	4–0
5	Latvia	10	2	1	7	5	19	−14	7		1–3	1–0	0–2	0–2	—	2–0
6	San Marino	10	0	1	9	0	34	−34	1		0–6	0–4	0–5	0–4	0–0	—

Source: UEFA
Rules for classification: Tiebreakers

3 September 2021	Latvia	0–2	Poland	Zemgale Olympic Center, Jelgava
16:00 (17:00 EEST)		Report	Skóraś 55'; Poręba 86'	Referee: Keith Kennedy (Northern Ireland)

7 September 2021	Poland	1–2	Israel	Arena Lublin, Lublin
20:00	Smoliński 7'	Report	Walukiewicz 32' (o.g.); Karzev 49'	Referee: Morten Krogh (Denmark)

8 October 2021	Hungary	2–2	Poland	Szent Gellért Fórum, Szeged
20:00	Németh 48', 90+5'	Report	Benedyczak 61' (pen.); Wędrychowski 81'	Referee: Glenn Nyberg (Sweden)

12 October 2021	Poland	3–0	San Marino	Arena Kielce, Kielce
16:30	Bogusz 29'; Kamiński 61'; Bejger 66'	Report		Referee: Nikola Popov (Bulgaria)

12 November 2021	Germany	0–4	Poland	Mechatronik Arena, Aspach
18:15		Report	Benedyczak 5', 12'; Skóraś 15'; Kozłowski 90'	Referee: Luis Godinho (Portugal)

16 November 2021	Poland	5–0	Latvia	Cracovia Stadium, Kraków
17:30	Benedyczak 32' (pen.); Bejger 45'; Śpiewak 45+1', 63'; Kozłowski 51'	Report		Attendance: 2,684; Referee: Robertas Valikonis (Lithuania)

24 March 2022	Israel	v	Poland
		Report

29 March 2022	Poland	v	Hungary
		Report

2 June 2022	San Marino	v	Poland
		Report

7 June 2022	Poland	v	Germany
		Report

=== Poland women's national football team ===
==== 2023 FIFA Women's World Cup qualification ====
===== Group F =====
Pos	Team	Pld	W	D	L	GF	GA	GD	Pts	Qualification	(Norway)	(Belgium)	(Poland)	(Albania)	(Kosovo)	(Armenia)
1	Norway	10	9	1	0	47	2	+45	28	2023 FIFA Women's World Cup	—	4–0	2–1	5–0	5–1	10–0
2	Belgium	10	7	1	2	56	7	+49	22	Play-offs	0–1	—	4–0	7–0	7–0	19–0
3	Poland	10	6	2	2	28	9	+19	20		0–0	1–1	—	2–0	7–0	12–0
4	Albania	10	3	1	6	14	30	−16	10		0–7	0–5	1–2	—	1–1	5–0
5	Kosovo	10	2	1	7	8	35	−27	7		0–3	1–6	1–2	1–3	—	2–1
6	Armenia	10	0	0	10	1	71	−70	0		0–10	0–7	0–1	0–4	0–1	—

Source: UEFA

17 September 2021	Poland	1–1	Belgium	Gdańsk Stadium, Gdańsk
19:00	Pajor 40'	Report	Cayman 79'	Referee: Iuliana Demetrescu (Romania)

21 September 2021	Armenia	0–1	Poland	Vazgen Sargsyan Republican Stadium, Yerevan
17:30 (19:30 AMT)		Report	Zawistowska 27'	Referee: Catarina Campos (Portugal)

21 October 2021	Poland	0–0	Norway	Stadion Miejski Widzewa, Łódź
19:15		Report		Referee: Jana Adámková (Czech Republic)

26 October 2021	Poland	2–0	Albania	Stadion Miejski, Tychy
19:45	Dudek 40' (pen.); Mesjasz 89'	Report		Referee: Simona Ghisletta (Switzerland)

25 November 2021	Kosovo	1–2	Poland	Fadil Vokrri Stadium, Pristina
16:00	Syla 4'	Report	Gec 17'; Wiankowska 34'	Referee: Galiya Echeva (Bulgaria)

30 November 2021	Belgium	4–0	Poland	Den Dreef, Leuven
20:00	De Caigny 15'; Eurlings 33'; Cayman 38'; Mesjasz 51' (o.g.)	Report		Referee: Marta Huerta De Aza (Spain)

7 April 2022	Poland	v	Armenia
		Report

12 April 2022	Norway	v	Poland
		Report
