= 2023 UEFA European Under-21 Championship qualification Group B =

Football tournament qualification stage

Group B of the 2023 UEFA European Under-21 Championship qualifying competition consisted of six teams: Germany, Poland, Israel, Hungary, Latvia, and San Marino. The composition of the nine groups in the qualifying group stage was decided by the draw held on 28 January 2021, 12:00 CET (UTC+1), at the UEFA headquarters in Nyon, Switzerland, with the teams seeded according to their coefficient ranking.

== Standings ==
Pos	Team	Pld	W	D	L	GF	GA	GD	Pts	Qualification	Germany	Israel	Poland	Hungary	Latvia	San Marino
1	Germany	10	9	0	1	32	9	+23	27	Final tournament	—	3–2	0–4	4–0	4–0	4–0
2	Israel	10	6	1	3	19	10	+9	19	Play-offs	0–1	—	2–2	3–0	2–1	2–0
3	Poland	10	5	3	2	26	9	+17	18		1–2	1–2	—	1–1	5–0	3–0
4	Hungary	10	4	2	4	16	17	−1	14		1–5	1–2	2–2	—	1–0	4–0
5	Latvia	10	2	1	7	5	19	−14	7		1–3	1–0	0–2	0–2	—	2–0
6	San Marino	10	0	1	9	0	34	−34	1		0–6	0–4	0–5	0–4	0–0	—

Source: UEFA
Rules for classification: Tiebreakers

== Matches ==
Times are CET/CEST, (Note: CEST (UTC+2) for dates between 31 March and 26 October 2021 and between 29 March and 24 October 2022, and CET (UTC+1) for all other dates.) as listed by UEFA (local times, if different, are in parentheses).

2 September 2021
17:30

Hungary	1–2	Israel
Tóth-Gábor 68'	Report	Nahmani 32'; Gandelman 86'

Ménfői úti Stadion, Győr
Attendance: 210
Referee: Vladimir Moskalyov (Russia)
2 September 2021
19:00

San Marino	0–6	Germany
	Report	Krauß 4'; Burkardt 20', 43'; Moukoko 39', 41'; Leweling 68'

San Marino Stadium, Serravalle
Attendance: 150
Referee: Ívar Orri Kristjánsson (Iceland)

3 September 2021
16:00 (17:00 EEST)

Latvia	0–2	Poland
	Report	Skóraś 55'; Poręba 86'

Zemgale Olympic Center, Jelgava
Attendance: 99
Referee: Keith Kennedy (Northern Ireland)

7 September 2021
18:15 (19:15 EEST)

Latvia	1–3	Germany
Korotkovs 8'	Report	Moukoko 25'; Stiller 41'; Thiaw 48'

Daugava Stadium, Riga
Attendance: 330
Referee: Sebastian Gishamer (Austria)
7 September 2021
20:00

Poland	1–2	Israel
Smoliński 7'	Report	Walukiewicz 32' (o.g.); Karzev 49'

Arena Lublin, Lublin
Attendance: 4,386
Referee: Morten Krogh (Denmark)
7 September 2021
20:30

San Marino	0–4	Hungary
	Report	Baráth 29'; Skribek 74', 82'; Kiss 90'

San Marino Stadium, Serravalle
Attendance: 90
Referee: Andrew Davey (Northern Ireland)

7 October 2021
13:00 (14:00 EEST)

Latvia	2–0	San Marino
Bočs 22'; Lūsiņš 78'	Report

Zemgale Olympic Center, Jelgava
Attendance: 173
Referee: Ivana Martinčić (Croatia)
7 October 2021
18:15

Germany	3–2	Israel
Tillman 34'; Schade 88'; Burkardt 90'	Report	Leidner 28'; Gandelman 51'

Benteler-Arena, Paderborn
Attendance: 3,262
Referee: Radu Petrescu (Romania)

8 October 2021
20:00

Hungary	2–2	Poland
Németh 48', 90+5'	Report	Benedyczak 61' (pen.); Wędrychowski 81'

Szent Gellért Fórum, Szeged
Attendance: 850
Referee: Glenn Nyberg (Sweden)

12 October 2021
16:30

Poland	3–0	San Marino
Bogusz 29'; Kamiński 61'; Bejger 66'	Report

Arena Kielce, Kielce
Attendance: 4,126
Referee: Nikola Popov (Bulgaria)
12 October 2021
17:30

Hungary	1–5	Germany
Kiss 39'	Report	Schade 5', 90'; Tillman 32'; Shuranov 54'; Krauß 66'

Szent Gellért Fórum, Szeged
Attendance: 1,360
Referee: David Coote (England)
12 October 2021
18:30 (19:30 UTC+3)

Israel	2–1	Latvia
Buganim 8'; Shahar 89'	Report	Veips 16'

HaMoshava Stadium, Petah Tikva
Attendance: 650
Referee: Jasmin Sabotic (Luxembourg)

11 November 2021
19:00

San Marino	0–4	Israel
	Report	Bilu 12'; Davida 13'; Buganim 28'; Shahar 31'

San Marino Stadium, Serravalle
Attendance: 110
Referee: Henrik Nalbandyan (Armenia)

12 November 2021
17:45

Hungary	1–0	Latvia
Szánthó 77'	Report

Pancho Aréna, Felcsút
Attendance: 260
Referee: Sandi Putros (Denmark)
12 November 2021
18:15

Germany	0–4	Poland
	Report	Benedyczak 5', 12'; Skóraś 15'; Kozłowski 90'

Mechatronik Arena, Aspach
Attendance: 3,994
Referee: Luis Godinho (Portugal)

16 November 2021
17:30

Poland	5–0	Latvia
Benedyczak 32' (pen.); Bejger 45'; Śpiewak 45+1', 63'; Kozłowski 51'	Report

Marshal Józef Piłsudski Stadium, Kraków
Attendance: 2,684
Referee: Robertas Valikonis (Lithuania)
16 November 2021
18:15

Germany	4–0	San Marino
Thiaw 14'; Shuranov 15'; Burkardt 34'; Thielmann 62'	Report

Audi Sportpark, Ingolstadt
Attendance: 2,004
Referee: Ion Orlic (Moldova)
16 November 2021
18:40 (19:40 UTC+2)

Israel	3–0	Hungary
Bar 5', 51'; Zasno 90+2'	Report

HaMoshava Stadium, Petah Tikva
Attendance: 930
Referee: Yaroslav Kozyk (Ukraine)

24 March 2022
16:30

Hungary	4–0	San Marino
Németh 5', 14'; Iyinbor 44'; Major 80'	Report

Hidegkuti Nándor Stadion, Budapest
Attendance: 350
Referee: Irakli Kvirikashvili (Georgia)
24 March 2022
17:30 (18:30 UTC+2)

Israel	2–2	Poland
Abada 50'; Gandelman 73'	Report	Benedyczak 10'; Kamiński 78'

HaMoshava Stadium, Petah Tikva
Attendance: 3,870
Referee: Bram Van Driessche (Belgium)

25 March 2022
18:15

Germany	4–0	Latvia
Burkardt 25', 43'; Knauff 26'; Tillman 75'	Report

New Tivoli, Aachen
Attendance: 7,718
Referee: Juxhin Xhaja (Albania)

29 March 2022
16:00

Poland	1–1	Hungary
Skóraś 90+5' (pen.)	Report	Németh 35'

Arena Zabrze, Zabrze
Attendance: 4,668
Referee: Kristoffer Hagenes (Norway)
29 March 2022
16:45 (17:45 UTC+3)

Israel	0–1	Germany
	Report	Katterbach 60'

HaMoshava Stadium, Petah Tikva
Attendance: 7,812
Referee: Jérémie Pignard (France)
29 March 2022
20:30

San Marino	0–0	Latvia
	Report

San Marino Stadium, Serravalle
Attendance: 241
Referee: Luis Texeira (Portugal)

2 June 2022
16:30 (17:30 EEST)

Latvia	1–0	Israel
Ozoliņš 46'	Report

Skonto Stadium, Riga
Attendance: 300
Referee: Bulat Sariyev (Kazakhstan)
2 June 2022
20:30

San Marino	0–5	Poland
	Report	Białek 4', 89' (pen.); Łopata 16'; Skóraś 33'; Kałuziński 82'

San Marino Stadium, Serravalle
Attendance: 363
Referee: Luka Bilbija (Bosnia and Herzegovina)

3 June 2022
18:15

Germany	4–0	Hungary
Moukoko 17'; Burkardt 31' (pen.); Krauß 76'; Samardžić 90+3'	Report

Stadion an der Bremer Brücke, Osnabrück
Attendance: 5,609
Referee: Yasar Kemal Ugurlu (Turkey)

7 June 2022
18:00 (19:00 UTC+3)

Israel	2–0	San Marino
Berkovich 2'; Podgoreanu 14'	Report

HaMoshava Stadium, Petah Tikva
Attendance: 1,021
Referee: Jamie Robinson (Northern Ireland)
7 June 2022
18:00 (19:00 EEST)

Latvia	0–2	Hungary
	Report	Németh 41', 54' (pen.)

Skonto Stadium, Riga
Attendance: 283
Referee: Miloš Bošković (Montenegro)
7 June 2022
18:00

Poland	1–2	Germany
Białek 35'	Report	Moukoko 25', 85'

Stadion Miejski ŁKS, Łódź
Attendance: 11,732
Referee: Manfredas Lukjancukas (Lithuania)

== Goalscorers ==
There were 98 goals scored in 30 matches, for an average of 3.27 goals per match.

7 goals

- (Germany) Jonathan Burkardt
- (Hungary) András Németh

6 goals

- (Germany) Youssoufa Moukoko

5 goals

- (Poland) Adrian Benedyczak

4 goals

- (Poland) Michał Skóraś

3 goals

- (Germany) Tom Krauß
- (Germany) Kevin Schade
- (Germany) Malik Tillman
- (Israel) Omri Gandelman
- (Poland) Bartosz Białek

2 goals

- (Germany) Erik Shuranov
- (Germany) Malick Thiaw
- (Hungary) Tamás Kiss
- (Hungary) Alen Skribek
- (Israel) Arad Bar
- (Israel) Itay Buganim
- (Israel) Ido Shahar
- (Poland) Łukasz Bejger
- (Poland) Jakub Kamiński
- (Poland) Kacper Kozłowski
- (Poland) Kacper Śpiewak

1 goal

- (Germany) Noah Katterbach
- (Germany) Ansgar Knauff
- (Germany) Jamie Leweling
- (Germany) Lazar Samardžić
- (Germany) Angelo Stiller
- (Germany) Jan Thielmann
- (Hungary) Péter Baráth
- (Hungary) Patrick Iyinbor
- (Hungary) Sámuel Major
- (Hungary) Regő Szánthó
- (Hungary) Kristóf Tóth-Gábor
- (Israel) Liel Abada
- (Israel) Amir Berkovich
- (Israel) Oz Bilu
- (Israel) Osher Davida
- (Israel) Eden Karzev
- (Israel) Doron Leidner
- (Israel) Stav Nahmani
- (Israel) Suf Podgoreanu
- (Israel) Zohar Zasno
- (Latvia) Rolands Bočs
- (Latvia) Ilja Korotkovs
- (Latvia) Kristers Lūsiņš
- (Latvia) Rihards Ozoliņš
- (Latvia) Roberts Veips
- (Poland) Mateusz Bogusz
- (Poland) Jakub Kałuziński
- (Poland) Kacper Łopata
- (Poland) Łukasz Poręba
- (Poland) Kacper Smoliński
- (Poland) Marcel Wędrychowski

1 own goal

- (Poland) Sebastian Walukiewicz (against Israel)
