= Kamil Lech =

Polish footballer

Personal information
- Date of birth: 15 September 1994 (age 32)
- Place of birth: Chorzów, Poland
- Height: 1.90 m (6 ft 3 in)
- Position: Goalkeeper

Youth career
- –2014: Ruch Chorzów

Senior career*
Years	Team	Apps	(Gls)
2014–2017	Ruch Chorzów	9	(0)
2017–2018	Podbeskidzie	0	(0)
2018–2022	Ruch Chorzów	34	(0)
2021	→ Warta Gorzów Wlkp. (loan)	33	(0)
2022	Kotwica Kołobrzeg	1	(0)
2024	MKS Myszków	8	(0)
- * Club domestic league appearances and goals as of 13:57, 15 September 2024 (UTC)

Kamil Lech (born 15 September 1994) is a Polish professional footballer who plays as a goalkeeper.

== Honours ==
Kotwica Kołobrzeg

- III liga, group II: 2021–22
