= 2021–22 III liga =

III liga
- Season: 2021–22
- Dates: 6 August 2021 – 18 June 2022
- Champions: Polonia Warsaw; Kotwica Kołobrzeg; Zagłębie Lubin II; Siarka Tarnobrzeg
- Matches played: 1,244
- Goals scored: 3,826 (3.08 per match)
- Top goalscorer: (Poland) Wojciech Białek (25 goals)

The 2021–22 III liga season was the 14th edition of the fourth tier domestic division in the Polish football league system since its establishment in 2008 under its current title (III liga) and the 6th season under its current league division format. The league was operated by the Polish Football Association (PZPN).

The competition was contested by 73 clubs split geographically across 4 groups, with the winners of each group gaining promotion to the II liga. The season was played in a round-robin tournament. It began in August 2021 and ended in June 2022. The teams included semi-professional clubs (although a few are professional) and the reserve teams of professional clubs.

== Format ==
Geographical criteria.

73 teams were divided into four groups according to geographical criteria:

- Group I (Łódź – Masovian – Podlaskie – Warmian-Masurian)
- Group II (Kuyavian-Pomeranian – Greater Poland – Pomeranian – West Pomeranian)
- Group III (Lower Silesian – Lubusz – Opole – Silesian)
- Group IV (Świętokrzyskie – Lesser Poland – Lublin – Podkarpackie)

Since 2021–22 season each group of III liga was operated by Polish Football Association (PZPN), not a different voivodship football association.

Location of teams and stadiums in 2021–22 III liga. Red: Group I, Green: Group II, Yellow: Group III, Blue: Group IV

== Changes from last season ==
The following teams have changed division since the 2020–21 season.

=== To III liga ===
Relegated from 2020–21 II liga	▼ Olimpia Grudziądz ▼ Błękitni Stargard	Promoted from 2020–21 IV liga	Group 1 ▲ ŁKS Łódź II ▲ Pilica Białobrzegi ▲ Wissa Szczuczyn ▲ Mamry Giżycko	Group 2 ▲ Zawisza Bydgoszcz ▲ Stolem Gniewino ▲ Pogoń Nowe Skalmierzyce ▲ Kluczevia Stargard	Group 3 ▲ Karkonosze Jelenia Góra ▲ Carina Gubin ▲ Odra Wodzisław Śląski	Group 4 ▲ Tomasovia Tomaszów Lubelski ▲ Unia Tarnów ▲ Korona Rzeszów ▲ Czarni Połaniec

=== From III liga ===
Promoted to 2021–22 II liga	▲ Pogoń Grodzisk Mazowiecki ▲ Radunia Stężyca ▲ Ruch Chorzów ▲ Wisła Puławy	Relegated to 2021–22 IV liga	Group 1 ▼GKS Wikielec ▼ Concordia Elbląg ▼RKS Radomsko ▼ Olimpia Zambrów ▼ Ruch Wysokie Mazowieckie ▼ Huragan Morąg ▼KS Wasilków	Group 2 ▼ Nielba Wągrowiec ▼ Flota Świnoujście ▼ Pomorzanin Toruń ▼ Unia Swarzędz ▼ Gwardia Koszalin ▼ Gryf Wejherowo ▼ Górnik Konin ▼ Chemik Police ▼ Mieszko Gniezno	Group 3 ▼ROW 1964 Rybnik ▼ Polonia-Stal Świdnica ▼ Polonia Nysa	Group 4 ▼ Lewart Lubartów ▼KS Wiązownica ▼ Korona II Kielce ▼ Stal Kraśnik ▼ Jutrzenka Giebułtów ▼ Hetman Zamość

== League tables ==
=== Group 1 ===
III liga Group 1
- Season: 2021–22
- Dates: 7 August 2021 – 18 June 2022
- Champions: Polonia Warsaw
- Relegated: Wissa Szczuczyn; Sokół Aleksandrów Łódzki; Znicz Biała Piska; GKS Wikielec; Mamry Giżycko; KS Kutno
- Matches played: 342
- Goals scored: 1,072 (3.13 per match)
- Top goalscorer: (Poland) Michał Strzałkowski (24 goals)

Pos	Team	Pld	W	D	L	GF	GA	GD	Pts	Promotion
1	Polonia Warsaw (C, P)	36	26	3	7	80	27	+53	81	Promotion to II liga
2	Legionovia Legionowo	36	24	8	4	76	39	+37	80	
3	Świt Nowy Dwór Mazowiecki	36	17	8	11	58	46	+12	59	
4	Legia Warsaw II	36	16	10	10	77	55	+22	58	
5	Błonianka Błonie	36	17	6	13	61	62	−1	57	
6	Lechia Tomaszów Mazowiecki	36	16	8	12	63	48	+15	56	
7	ŁKS Łódź II	36	15	9	12	63	52	+11	54	
8	Ursus Warsaw	36	15	8	13	53	63	−10	53	
9	Jagiellonia Białystok II	36	16	4	16	66	58	+8	52	
10	Broń Radom	36	15	6	15	48	55	−7	51	
11	Unia Skierniewice	36	15	4	17	60	58	+2	49	
12	Pelikan Łowicz	36	12	10	14	57	46	+11	46	
13	Pilica Białobrzegi	36	13	6	17	57	72	−15	45	
14	KS Kutno (R)	36	11	10	15	47	61	−14	43	Relegation to IV liga
15	Mamry Giżycko (R)	36	13	3	20	40	66	−26	42	Relegation to IV liga
16	GKS Wikielec (R)	36	10	12	14	42	53	−11	42	Relegation to IV liga
17	Znicz Biała Piska (R)	36	12	6	18	55	69	−14	42	Relegation to IV liga
18	Sokół Aleksandrów Łódzki (R)	36	5	10	21	36	64	−28	25	Relegation to IV liga
19	Wissa Szczuczyn (R)	36	4	9	23	28	73	−45	21	Relegation to IV liga

Source: 90minut.pl
Rules for classification: 1. Number of points reached in the entire series of games; 2. Number of points reached in direct matches; 3. Goal difference in direct matches; 4. Goal difference in direct matches – away goals counted twice; 5. Goal difference in the whole series of games; 6. Number of goals scored in the entire series of games.
(C) Champions; (P) Promoted; (R) Relegated

=== Group 2 ===
III liga Group 2
- Season: 2021–22
- Dates: 6 August 2021 – 18 June 2022
- Champions: Kotwica Kołobrzeg
- Relegated: Elana Toruń; Kluczevia Stargard; Bałtyk Koszalin
- Matches played: 290
- Goals scored: 897 (3.09 per match)
- Top goalscorer: (Poland) Jakub Bojas (23 goals)

Pos	Team	Pld	W	D	L	GF	GA	GD	Pts	Promotion
1	Kotwica Kołobrzeg (C, P)	34	24	6	4	75	25	+50	78	Promotion to II liga
2	Olimpia Grudziądz	34	24	5	5	77	24	+53	77	
3	Unia Janikowo	34	18	6	10	62	47	+15	60	
4	Pogoń Szczecin II	34	16	10	8	60	36	+24	58	
5	Pogoń Nowe Skalmierzyce	34	17	7	10	54	42	+12	58	
6	Sokół Kleczew	34	17	5	12	53	39	+14	56	
7	Świt Szczecin	34	16	8	10	56	37	+19	56	
8	Zawisza Bydgoszcz	34	14	8	12	57	51	+6	50	
9	Błękitni Stargard	34	13	6	15	48	54	−6	45	
10	Polonia Środa Wielkopolska	34	12	7	15	40	63	−23	43	
11	KP Starogard Gdański	34	11	9	14	44	51	−7	42	
12	Stolem Gniewino	34	10	11	13	43	66	−23	41	
13	Jarota Jarocin	34	9	9	16	40	47	−7	36	
14	Bałtyk Gdynia	34	10	6	18	44	57	−13	36	
15	GKS Przodkowo	34	9	9	16	40	51	−11	36	
16	Bałtyk Koszalin (R)	34	9	8	17	40	58	−18	35	Relegation to IV liga
17	Kluczevia Kluczewo (R)	34	7	5	22	28	65	−37	26	Relegation to IV liga
18	Elana Toruń (Note: Elana Toruń withdrawn the league after the first half of the season. They relegated to IV liga replacing their reserve team.) (W)	34	6	3	25	36	84	−48	21	Withdrawal

Source: 90minut.pl
Rules for classification: 1. Number of points reached in the entire series of games; 2. Number of points reached in direct matches; 3. Goal difference in direct matches; 4. Goal difference in direct matches – away goals counted twice; 5. Goal difference in the whole series of games; 6. Number of goals scored in the entire series of games.
(C) Champions; (P) Promoted; (R) Relegated; (W) Withdrawn

=== Group 3 ===
III liga Group 3
- Season: 2021–22
- Dates: 7 August 2021 – 15 June 2022
- Champions: Zagłębie Lubin II
- Relegated: Foto-Higiena Gać; Karkonosze Jelenia Góra; Piast Żmigród
- Matches played: 306
- Goals scored: 954 (3.12 per match)
- Top goalscorer: (Poland) Patryk Kusztal (17 goals)

Pos	Team	Pld	W	D	L	GF	GA	GD	Pts	Promotion
1	Zagłębie Lubin II (C, P)	34	23	8	3	86	42	+44	77	Promotion to II liga
2	Ślęza Wrocław	34	20	9	5	83	37	+46	69	
3	Polonia Bytom	34	20	5	9	66	34	+32	65	
4	Rekord Bielsko-Biała	34	18	8	8	70	43	+27	62	
5	LKS Goczałkowice-Zdrój	34	15	9	10	47	41	+6	54	
6	Miedź Legnica II	34	15	7	12	56	63	−7	52	
7	Górnik Zabrze II	34	15	6	13	49	49	0	51	
8	Pniówek Pawłowice	34	12	11	11	55	55	0	47	
9	Stal Brzeg	34	14	4	16	51	47	+4	46	
10	Lechia Zielona Góra	34	12	9	13	49	44	+5	45	
11	Odra Wodzisław Śląski	34	12	7	15	47	63	−16	43	
12	MKS Kluczbork	34	12	7	15	55	57	−2	43	
13	Gwarek Tarnowskie Góry	34	9	12	13	44	50	−6	39	
14	Carina Gubin	34	11	6	17	40	49	−9	39	
15	Warta Gorzów Wielkopolski	34	9	9	16	41	54	−13	36	
16	Piast Żmigród (R)	34	10	6	18	46	76	−30	36	Relegation to IV liga
17	Karkonosze Jelenia Góra (R)	34	9	3	22	40	69	−29	30	Relegation to IV liga
18	Foto-Higiena Gać (R)	34	4	6	24	29	81	−52	18	Relegation to IV liga

Source: 90minut.pl
Rules for classification: 1. Number of points reached in the entire series of games; 2. Number of points reached in direct matches; 3. Goal difference in direct matches; 4. Goal difference in direct matches – away goals counted twice; 5. Goal difference in the whole series of games; 6. Number of goals scored in the entire series of games.
(C) Champions; (P) Promoted; (R) Relegated

=== Group 4 ===
III liga Group 4
- Season: 2021–22
- Dates: 7 August 2021 – 18 June 2022
- Champions: Siarka Tarnobrzeg
- Relegated: Wólczanka Wólka Pełkińska; Tomasovia Tomaszów Lubelski; Korona Rzeszów
- Matches played: 306
- Goals scored: 903 (2.95 per match)
- Top goalscorer: (Poland) Wojciech Białek (25 goals)

Pos	Team	Pld	W	D	L	GF	GA	GD	Pts	Promotion
1	Siarka Tarnobrzeg (C, P)	34	22	6	6	68	29	+39	72	Promotion to II liga
2	Chełmianka Chełm	34	20	6	8	55	31	+24	66	
3	ŁKS Łagów	34	20	6	8	59	31	+28	66	
4	Avia Świdnik	34	20	5	9	67	32	+35	65	
5	Podhale Nowy Targ	34	17	8	9	65	44	+21	59	
6	Cracovia II	34	17	7	10	67	38	+29	58	
7	Stal Stalowa Wola	34	15	6	13	48	38	+10	51	
8	KSZO Ostrowiec Świętokrzyski	34	14	9	11	41	39	+2	51	
9	Unia Tarnów	34	12	12	10	50	48	+2	48	
10	Wisłoka Dębica	34	12	12	10	51	59	−8	48	
11	Orlęta Radzyń Podlaski	34	12	10	12	55	52	+3	46	
12	Czarni Połaniec	34	11	8	15	47	63	−16	41	
13	Sokół Sieniawa	34	11	8	15	38	62	−24	41	
14	Podlasie Biała Podlaska	34	9	12	13	41	49	−8	39	
15	Wisła Sandomierz	34	8	6	20	42	68	−26	30	
16	Korona Rzeszów (R)	34	7	8	19	42	74	−32	29	Relegation to IV liga
17	Tomasovia Tomaszów Lubelski (R)	32	5	4	23	37	69	−32	19	Relegation to IV liga
18	Wólczanka Wólka Pełkińska (R)	34	4	5	25	30	77	−47	17	Relegation to IV liga

Updated to match(es) played on 5 December 2020. Source: 90minut.pl
Rules for classification: 1. Number of points reached in the entire series of games; 2. Number of points reached in direct matches; 3. Goal difference in direct matches; 4. Goal difference in direct matches – away goals counted twice; 5. Goal difference in the whole series of games; 6. Number of goals scored in the entire series of games.
(C) Champions; (P) Promoted; (R) Relegated

== See also ==
- 2021–22 Ekstraklasa
- 2021–22 I liga
- 2021–22 II liga
- 2021–22 Polish Cup
