= 2021–22 I liga =

Polish football season

I liga
- Season: 2021–22
- Dates: 30 July 2021 – 22 May 2022
- Champions: Miedź Legnica
- Promoted: Miedź Legnica; Widzew Łódź; Korona Kielce
- Relegated: GKS Jastrzębie; Górnik Polkowice; Stomil Olsztyn
- Matches: 306
- Goals: 760 (2.48 per match)
- Top goalscorer: Kamil Biliński (19 goals)
- Biggest home win: Arka 6–0 Stomil (5 December 2021)
- Biggest away win: Jastrzębie 1–5 Arka (4 October 2021); Stomil 0–4 Górnik (20 March 2022); ŁKS 0–4 Odra (15 May 2022)
- Highest scoring: Puszcza 5–2 Korona (27 November 2021); Widzew 2–5 Arka (25 February 2022)
- Longest winning run: 7 matches Miedź Legnica
- Longest unbeaten run: 17 matches Miedź Legnica
- Longest winless run: 18 matches Górnik Polkowice
- Longest losing run: 6 matches Stomil Olsztyn
- Highest attendance: 17,409 (Note: Due to the COVID-19 pandemic, the match have been played with a limited number of spectators.); Widzew 2–2 ŁKS (24 October 2021)
- Lowest attendance: 0 (Note: Matches have been played behind closed doors without any spectators.); 20 matches
- Total attendance: 863,386 (Note: Due to the COVID-19 pandemic, some matches have been played with a limited number of spectators or behind closed doors without any spectators.)
- Average attendance: 3,019 (Note: Average attendance without matches played behind closed doors without any spectators.) ▲59.7% 2,822 (Note: Average attendance from all games played.) ▲49.3%

The 2021–22 I liga (also known as Fortuna I liga due to sponsorship reasons) was the 74th season of the second tier domestic division in the Polish football league system since its establishment in 1949 and the 14th season of the Polish I liga under its current title. The league is operated by the PZPN.

The regular season was played as a round-robin tournament. A total of 18 teams participated, 14 of which competed in the league campaign during the previous season, while one to be relegated from the 2020–21 Ekstraklasa and the remaining three to be promoted from the 2020–21 II liga. The season started on 30 July 2021 and concluded on 22 May 2022. Each team played a total of 34 matches, half at home and half away.

== Teams ==
A total of 18 teams participate in the 2021–22 I liga season.

=== Changes from last season ===
The following teams have changed division since the 2020–21 season.

==== To I liga ====
Relegated from 2020–21 Ekstraklasa	Promoted from 2020–21 II liga
▼ Podbeskidzie Bielsko-Biała	▲ Górnik Polkowice ▲GKS Katowice ▲ Skra Częstochowa

==== From I liga ====
Promoted to 2021–22 Ekstraklasa	Relegated to 2021–22 II liga
▲ Radomiak Radom ▲ Bruk-Bet Termalica Nieciecza ▲ Górnik Łęczna	▼GKS Bełchatów

=== Stadiums and locations ===
Location of teams in 2021–22 I liga.
Location of teams in the Metropolis GZM in 2022-23 I liga.

Note: Table lists in alphabetical order.

Team	Location	Venue	Capacity
Arka Gdynia	Gdynia	Stadion Miejski	15,139
Chrobry Głogów	Głogów	Stadion GOS	2,817
GKS Jastrzębie	Jastrzębie-Zdrój	Stadion Miejski	5,650
GKS Katowice	Katowice	Stadion GKS	6,710
GKS Tychy	Tychy	Stadion Miejski	15,150
Górnik Polkowice	Polkowice	Stadion Miejski	4,325
Korona Kielce	Kielce	Suzuki Arena	15,550
ŁKS Łódź	Łódź	Stadion im. Władysława Króla	5,700 -> 18,033 ^{2}
Miedź Legnica	Legnica	Stadion Orła Białego	6,864
Odra Opole	Opole	Stadion Odry	4,560
Podbeskidzie Bielsko-Biała	Bielsko-Biała	Stadion Miejski	15,076
Puszcza Niepołomice	Niepołomice	Stadion Miejski	2,118
Resovia	Rzeszów	Stadion Stal^{1}	11,547
Sandecja Nowy Sącz	Nowy Sącz	Stadion im. Ojca Władysława Augustynka	2,988
Skra Częstochowa	Częstochowa	GIEKSA Arena ^{3}	5,264
Stomil Olsztyn	Olsztyn	Stadion Miejski	4,200
Widzew Łódź	Łódź	Stadion Widzewa	18,018
Zagłębie Sosnowiec	Sosnowiec	Stadion Ludowy	7,500

1. Due to the renovation of the Resovia Stadium in Rzeszów, Resovia will play their home games at Stadion Stal in Rzeszów. Originally they declared to play home matches at the Podkarpackie Centrum Piłki Nożnej in Stalowa Wola.
2. ŁKS played its home games in a partially-completed stadium until the April 22 match against Chrobry Głogów, when the remainder of the stadium was officially opened for use.
3. In the first half of the 2021/2022 season Skra played every home match on the opponent's stadium, as the home team, because Municipal Football Stadium Loretańska in Częstochowa didn't meet the license requirements of the I liga. From April 7, 2022, they play their home games at a substitute stadium GIEKSA Arena. Originally they declared to play home matches at the Stadion Ludowy in Sosnowiec.

== League table ==
Pos	Team	Pld	W	D	L	GF	GA	GD	Pts	Promotion or Relegation
1	Miedź Legnica (C, P)	34	23	8	3	56	22	+34	77	Promotion to Ekstraklasa
2	Widzew Łódź (P)	34	18	8	8	53	38	+15	62	Promotion to Ekstraklasa
3	Arka Gdynia	34	19	4	11	62	39	+23	61	Qualification for Promotion play-offs
4	Korona Kielce (O, P)	34	15	11	8	46	37	+9	56	Qualification for Promotion play-offs
5	Odra Opole	34	14	9	11	51	46	+5	51	Qualification for Promotion play-offs
6	Chrobry Głogów	34	13	11	10	43	34	+9	50	Qualification for Promotion play-offs
7	Sandecja Nowy Sącz	34	12	11	11	39	36	+3	47	
8	GKS Katowice	34	11	13	10	44	47	−3	46	
9	Podbeskidzie Bielsko-Biała	34	11	12	11	48	41	+7	45	
10	ŁKS Łódź	34	12	9	13	33	37	−4	45	
11	Resovia Rzeszów	34	11	11	12	42	39	+3	44	
12	GKS Tychy	34	11	11	12	37	41	−4	44	
13	Skra Częstochowa	34	8	14	12	28	41	−13	38	
14	Puszcza Niepołomice	34	10	7	17	41	50	−9	37	
15	Zagłębie Sosnowiec	34	8	12	14	41	48	−7	36	
16	Stomil Olsztyn (R)	34	10	5	19	32	52	−20	35	Relegation to II liga
17	Górnik Polkowice (R)	34	5	14	15	32	54	−22	29	Relegation to II liga
18	GKS Jastrzębie (R)	34	5	10	19	32	58	−26	25	Relegation to II liga

Source: 1liga.org, 90minut.pl
Rules for classification: 1) Points; 2) Head-to-head points; 3) Head-to-head goal difference; 4) Goal difference; 6) Goals scored; 7) Number of wins; 8) Number of away wins. (Note: Head-to-head record is used only after all the matches between the teams in question have been played)
(C) Champions; (O) Play-off winner; (P) Promoted; (R) Relegated

== Positions by round ==
Note: The place taken by the team that played fewer matches than the opponents was underlined. (Note: The list of postponed matches: Sandecja Nowy Sącz – Skra Częstochowa (6th round, played on 17 November 2021); GKS Katowice – Arka Gdynia (7th round, played on 16 September 2021); GKS Tychy – Chrobry Głogów (7th round, played on 16 September 2021); Górnik Polkowice – Stomil Olsztyn (7th round, played on 16 September 2021); Puszcza Niepołomice – Sandecja Nowy Sącz (7th round, played on 15 September 2021); Resovia – Miedź Legnica (9th round, played on 19 October 2021); Chrobry Głogów – ŁKS Łódź (12th round, played on 1 December 2021); Górnik Polkowice – Puszcza Niepołomice (12th round, played on 20 October 2021); Odra Opole – Skra Częstochowa (12th round, played on 20 October 2021); Stomil Olsztyn – Podbeskidzie Bielsko-Biała (12th round, played on 21 October 2021); Korona Kielce – GKS Tychy (17th round, played on 24 November 2021); Zagłębie Sosnowiec – Chrobry Głogów (17th round, played on 24 November 2021); Resovia – GKS Katowice (18th round, played on 1 December 2021); Stomil Olsztyn – GKS Jastrzębie (19th round, played on 16 March 2022); ŁKS Łódź – Puszcza Niepołomice (20th round, played on 9 March 2022); GKS Katowice - Widzew Łódź (25th round, played on 6 April 2022); GKS Tychy - Arka Gdynia (25th round, played on 7 April 2022); Korona Kielce - Podbeskidzie Bielsko-Biała (25th round, played on 5 April 2022); Odra Opole - Górnik Polkowice (25th round, played on 6 April 2022); Puszcza Niepołomice - Zagłębie Sosnowiec (25th round, played on 6 April 2022); Resovia - Stomil Olsztyn (25th round, played on 5 April 2022); Sandecja Nowy Sącz - GKS Jastrzębie (25th round, played on 5 April 2022); Skra Częstochowa - Chrobry Głogów (25th round, played on 7 April 2022))

Team ╲ Round	1	2	3	4	5	6	7	8	9	10	11	12	13	14	15	16	17	18	19	20	21	22	23	24	25	26	27	28	29	30	31	32	33	34
Miedź Legnica	1	1	1	2	2	3	3	3	4	9	6	4	3	2	2	2	1	1	1	1	1	1	1	1	1	1	1	1	1	1	1	1	1	1
Widzew Łódź	2	1	2	3	3	2	2	2	2	1	1	1	1	1	1	1	2	2	2	2	2	2	2	2	2	2	2	2	2	3	2	2	2	2
Arka Gdynia	8	14	9	7	6	6	7	9	9	7	4	5	6	6	7	5	7	8	9	7	5	5	4	5	5	3	3	3	3	2	3	3	3	3
Korona Kielce	4	3	3	1	1	1	1	1	1	2	2	2	2	3	3	3	3	3	4	3	3	3	3	3	3	4	4	4	4	4	4	4	4	4
Odra Opole	17	7	10	8	4	7	8	7	8	6	9	9	9	9	9	8	9	10	10	10	10	11	11	10	10	9	8	8	8	8	7	5	5	5
Chrobry Głogów	5	4	5	5	7	5	6	8	11	10	10	10	10	10	12	11	12	11	11	8	6	4	6	4	4	5	5	5	5	5	5	6	6	6
Sandecja Nowy Sącz	18	9	6	6	8	10	11	10	3	8	5	6	4	4	4	6	4	5	5	5	7	8	9	8	8	8	7	7	6	6	6	7	7	7
GKS Katowice	6	11	14	15	9	13	13	15	16	18	12	13	13	12	13	13	13	13	14	13	13	13	13	12	12	12	13	13	13	11	12	12	11	8
Podbeskidzie Bielsko-Biała	8	16	15	14	11	8	4	5	5	3	7	7	8	7	5	7	5	4	3	4	4	6	7	9	9	10	10	10	10	9	9	9	8	9
ŁKS Łódź	8	5	4	4	5	4	5	4	7	5	8	8	7	8	8	9	8	6	7	9	9	9	8	6	6	6	6	6	7	7	8	8	9	10
Resovia	6	6	8	9	10	11	9	11	12	12	14	11	10	11	10	12	11	12	12	11	11	10	10	11	11	11	11	11	11	12	11	11	12	11
GKS Tychy	8	13	17	17	14	9	10	6	6	4	3	3	5	5	6	4	6	7	6	6	8	7	5	7	7	7	9	9	9	10	10	10	10	12
Skra Częstochowa	15	18	11	12	16	16	15	12	10	11	11	12	12	13	11	10	10	9	8	12	12	12	12	13	13	13	12	12	12	14	13	13	14	13
Puszcza Niepołomice	3	8	11	10	16	17	17	13	14	14	16	16	14	14	14	14	15	15	13	15	15	15	14	15	15	15	15	15	15	13	14	15	13	14
Zagłębie Sosnowiec	8	11	7	11	15	15	14	17	17	15	13	14	16	15	15	16	16	16	15	14	14	14	15	14	14	14	14	14	14	15	15	14	15	15
Stomil Olsztyn	14	17	18	18	18	18	18	18	18	16	18	17	15	17	18	15	14	14	16	16	16	16	16	16	16	17	16	16	16	16	16	16	16	16
Górnik Polkowice	8	14	16	16	13	14	16	14	13	13	15	15	18	18	17	17	17	18	17	18	18	18	18	18	18	16	17	17	17	17	17	17	17	17
GKS Jastrzębie	15	10	13	13	12	12	12	16	15	17	17	18	17	16	16	18	18	17	18	17	17	17	17	17	17	18	18	18	18	18	18	18	18	18

I liga champion Promotion to Ekstraklasa
Promotion to Ekstraklasa
Qualification for promotion play-offs
Relegation to II liga

Source: 90minut.pl

== Results ==
Home \ Away	ARK	GŁO	JAS	KAT	TYC	GÓR	KOR	ŁKS	MLE	ODR	PBB	PNI	RES	SNS	SKR	STO	WID	ZSO
Arka Gdynia	—	0–2	3–2	2–2	0–1	2–0	0–0	2–0	0–2	3–0	1–0	2–0	2–0	2–1	3–2	6–0	3–1	1–1
Chrobry Głogów	1–0	—	2–0	4–0	2–0	2–0	1–1	1–0	0–0	1–0	1–3	2–2	3–3	1–0	0–1	2–0	0–0	4–0
GKS Jastrzębie	1–5	4–2	—	0–0	3–2	3–1	0–2	1–1	0–2	1–3	0–1	0–2	1–1	0–3	0–1	1–0	0–2	1–1
GKS Katowice	2–4	0–0	3–1	—	2–2	1–2	1–0	2–0	2–3	1–3	2–2	1–0	2–2	0–0	3–0	2–1	0–2	3–2
GKS Tychy	0–2	1–0	4–1	1–1	—	1–1	1–1	1–1	0–3	2–1	0–0	3–1	0–1	2–1	0–0	1–2	1–1	2–1
Górnik Polkowice	2–1	0–0	1–0	1–1	0–1	—	2–2	0–2	0–1	1–1	1–1	0–1	3–0	0–2	0–0	2–2	0–0	2–4
Korona Kielce	1–2	2–2	2–1	1–2	0–1	2–1	—	1–0	0–0	2–1	2–1	3–1	2–1	0–1	2–0	1–1	0–1	2–1
ŁKS Łódź	1–0	0–1	2–2	1–0	2–0	1–1	0–0	—	0–1	0–4	1–2	2–0	0–3	3–2	3–2	0–2	0–1	0–1
Miedź Legnica	1–0	1–0	1–1	1–0	2–0	3–1	1–1	0–2	—	2–0	4–2	3–1	2–1	0–0	1–1	1–2	1–0	4–0
Odra Opole	1–3	1–0	2–2	4–2	1–1	1–1	3–1	3–0	1–4	—	1–1	1–2	0–3	1–2	1–0	2–0	0–0	1–0
Podbeskidzie Bielsko-Biała	1–1	2–1	0–0	1–2	0–0	4–0	2–3	1–1	1–1	0–3	—	4–0	2–0	0–1	1–0	0–1	4–0	0–2
Puszcza Niepołomice	2–3	2–2	0–0	1–1	2–2	3–0	5–2	0–2	0–1	3–0	4–2	—	1–0	1–2	1–2	0–2	0–1	1–1
Resovia	4–1	3–0	1–0	2–2	1–0	0–0	0–1	1–2	0–2	3–3	1–1	1–1	—	0–1	0–1	1–1	1–0	0–0
Sandecja Nowy Sącz	3–1	0–0	2–0	1–1	2–3	1–1	2–2	0–1	1–3	1–2	0–1	1–0	0–0	—	0–1	1–0	2–2	1–1
Skra Częstochowa	2–1	2–2	1–1	0–0	1–0	2–2	1–4	0–0	0–2	2–2	1–1	1–2	0–1	0–0	—	0–0	2–2	1–2
Stomil Olsztyn	0–1	1–2	0–3	0–1	2–1	0–4	0–1	0–3	3–0	1–2	2–4	1–0	4–2	1–2	0–1	—	0–2	3–1
Widzew Łódź	2–5	2–0	3–1	3–1	2–1	4–2	1–2	2–2	1–1	0–1	2–1	1–0	1–4	3–0	4–0	2–0	—	3–2
Zagłębie Sosnowiec	1–0	3–2	2–1	0–1	1–2	5–0	0–0	0–0	1–2	1–1	2–2	1–2	0–1	3–3	0–0	0–0	1–2	—

Source: 1liga.org, 90minut.pl
Legend: Blue = home team win; Yellow = draw; Red = away team win.
For upcoming matches, an "a" indicates there is an article about the rivalry between the two participants.

== Results by round ==
Team ╲ Round	1	2	3	4	5	6	7	8	9	10	11	12	13	14	15	16	17	18	19	20	21	22	23	24	25	26	27	28	29	30	31	32	33	34
Arka	D	L	W	W	L	W	L	W	L	W	W	D	L	W	L	W	L	L	L	W	W	W	W	D	W	W	W	W	W	W	L	L	D	W
Chrobry	W	W	L	D	L	W	L	L	D	W	D	L	D	L	W	W	L	W	W	D	W	W	D	W	D	D	L	D	W	D	L	L	D	W
GKS Jastrzębie	L	W	L	D	D	D	L	L	D	L	L	L	W	D	D	L	L	D	L	D	L	L	W	D	L	L	W	L	L	L	L	L	W	D
GKS Katowice	D	L	D	D	W	L	L	L	D	L	W	D	D	W	D	W	L	L	D	W	D	W	D	D	L	L	L	W	D	W	D	W	W	W
GKS Tychy	D	L	L	D	W	W	W	W	D	W	W	D	L	D	D	W	L	W	L	L	D	W	W	L	L	L	D	D	D	L	L	W	L	D
Górnik	D	L	L	D	W	L	D	D	D	L	D	L	L	D	D	D	L	L	D	L	L	L	D	W	W	D	D	D	L	W	L	L	W	L
Korona	W	W	W	W	W	W	D	W	L	D	D	D	L	D	W	L	W	L	L	W	D	D	W	D	D	W	W	D	L	W	W	L	L	D
ŁKS	D	W	W	D	L	W	L	W	L	W	L	W	D	D	L	W	W	D	L	D	D	W	L	W	L	D	W	D	L	L	L	W	L	L
Miedź	W	W	W	D	W	D	D	L	L	W	W	W	W	D	W	D	W	W	W	W	W	W	W	D	W	W	L	D	D	W	W	W	W	W
Odra	L	W	L	W	W	L	D	D	W	W	L	L	W	D	L	W	D	L	D	W	D	L	L	W	W	D	W	D	D	L	W	W	W	L
Podbeskidzie	D	L	D	D	W	W	W	L	W	W	L	L	W	D	W	L	W	W	D	L	D	D	L	D	D	L	D	D	L	W	L	W	D	L
Puszcza	W	L	L	D	L	L	W	L	D	L	L	W	W	L	D	L	L	D	W	W	L	L	W	L	D	D	L	L	W	W	D	L	W	L
Resovia	D	W	L	D	D	L	W	L	L	L	W	W	L	L	W	D	D	W	D	W	L	W	L	L	L	D	D	D	D	D	W	W	L	W
Sandecja	L	W	W	D	L	W	W	W	L	W	L	W	W	D	L	W	L	D	D	L	D	L	D	W	D	W	L	D	D	L	W	D	D	L
Skra	L	L	W	D	L	D	W	W	L	D	D	L	D	W	W	W	W	L	D	L	L	D	D	L	L	D	D	D	D	L	W	D	L	D
Stomil	L	L	L	L	L	L	W	D	L	W	L	W	L	L	L	W	W	L	L	D	L	W	L	L	L	D	W	L	W	W	L	D	D	W
Widzew	W	W	W	L	W	W	D	W	D	W	W	W	W	D	L	D	L	D	W	D	L	W	D	L	W	W	D	W	W	L	W	L	L	W
Zagłębie	D	L	W	L	L	L	D	L	D	D	W	L	L	D	D	L	W	W	L	W	D	L	L	W	W	D	L	D	D	L	W	D	D	L

Source: 1 liga.org, 90minut.pl
W = Win; D = Draw; L = Loss

== Promotion play-offs ==
I liga play-offs for the 2021–22 season will be played on 26 and 29 May 2022. The teams who finished in 3rd, 4th, 5th and 6th place are set to compete. The fixtures are determined by final league position – 3rd team of regular season vs 6th team of regular season and 4th team of regular season vs 5th team of regular season. The winner of final match will be promoted to the Ekstraklasa for next season. All matches will be played in a stadiums of team which occupied higher position in regular season.

Semi-finals; 26 May 2022
3	Arka Gdynia	0
6	Chrobry Głogów	2
4	Korona Kielce	3
5	Odra Opole	0

Final; 29 May 2022
4	Korona Kielce	3
6	Chrobry Głogów	2

=== Matches ===
==== Semi-finals ====
26 May 2022
18:00 CEST

Korona Kielce	3–0	Odra Opole
Podgórski 5', 39'; Frączczak 31' (pen.)	Report

Suzuki Arena, Kielce
Attendance: 7,030
Referee: Tomasz Musiał (Kraków)
26 May 2022
20:45 CEST

Arka Gdynia	0–2	Chrobry Głogów
	Report	Piła 41'; Lebedyński 71'

Stadion Miejski, Gdynia
Attendance: 6,438
Referee: Szymon Marciniak (Płock)

==== Final ====
29 May 2022
20:45 CEST

Korona Kielce	3–2 (a.e.t.)	Chrobry Głogów
Frączczak 18', 64' (pen.); Kiełb 119'	Report	Lebedyński 38'; Rzuchowski 39'

Suzuki Arena, Kielce
Attendance: 14,169
Referee: Paweł Raczkowski (Warsaw)

== Season statistics ==
=== Top goalscorers ===
Rank	Player	Club	Goals
1	(Poland) Kamil Biliński	Podbeskidzie Bielsko-Biała	19
2	(Poland) Szymon Sobczak	Zagłębie Sosnowiec	17
3	(Poland) Hubert Adamczyk	Arka Gdynia	14
3	(Poland) Patryk Makuch	Miedź Legnica	14
5	(Poland) Karol Czubak	Arka Gdynia	12
6	(Poland) Szymon Kobusiński	Puszcza Niepołomice	11
6	(Poland) Patryk Mikita	Stomil Olsztyn	11
6	(Poland) Mateusz Piątkowski	Górnik Polkowice	11
6	(Poland) Filip Szymczak	GKS Katowice	11
10	(Poland) Mikołaj Lebedyński	Chrobry Głogów	10
10	(Slovakia) Tomáš Mikinič	Odra Opole	10
10	(Spain) Pirulo	ŁKS Łódź	10

== Attendances ==
Pos	Team	Total	High	Low	Average	Change
1	Widzew Łódź	268,540	17,409	13,450	15,800	+171.3%
3	ŁKS Łódź	90,807	17,052	0	5,700	+172.1%
4	Arka Gdynia	79,456	7,556	3,407	4,700	+38.6%
2	Korona Kielce	76,846	7,254	3,276	4,500	+90.3%
5	Podbeskidzie Bielsko-Biała	50,612	5,030	1,936	3,000	−23.0%^{1}
7	Miedź Legnica	46,320	4,146	2,053	2,700	+61.5%
6	GKS Tychy	43,236	4,817	1,648	2,500	−15.3%
8	GKS Katowice	28,687	3,593	0	2,200	n/a^{2}
10	Odra Opole	29,981	2,913	1,480	1,800	+59.6%
9	Skra Częstochowa	26,029	12,820	0	1,600	n/a^{2}
11	Resovia	26,793	3,468	1,014	1,600	−2.5%
12	Stomil Olsztyn	24,044	3,099	717	1,400	+67.5%
14	Zagłębie Sosnowiec	21,434	2,414	959	1,300	+4.8%
15	GKS Jastrzębie	17,810	1,878	712	1,000	−46.9%
13	Sandecja Nowy Sącz	4,053	2,592	0	1,000	+211.5%
18	Chrobry Głogów	10,459	1,083	0	700	+39.2%
16	Puszcza Niepołomice	10,558	908	412	600	+56.7%
17	Górnik Polkowice	7,721	700	310	500	n/a^{2}
	League total	863,386	17,409	0	3,019	+59.7%

Source: 90minut.pl (in Polish)
Notes:
1. Team played last season in Ekstraklasa.
2. Team played last season in II liga.

== Awards ==
=== Monthly awards ===
==== Player of the Month ====
Month	Player	Club
September 2021	(Poland) Juliusz Letniowski	Widzew Łódź
October 2021	(Poland) Kamil Biliński	Podbeskidzie Bielsko-Biała
November 2021	(Poland) Kamil Biliński	Podbeskidzie Bielsko-Biała
March 2022	(Poland) Rafał Leszczyński	Chrobry Głogów
April 2022	(Poland) Hubert Adamczyk	Arka Gdynia
May 2022	(Poland) Patryk Makuch	Miedź Legnica

== Number of teams by region ==
Number	Region	Team(s)
6	Silesian Voivodeship	GKS Jastrzębie, GKS Katowice, GKS Tychy, Podbeskidzie Bielsko-Biała, Skra Częstochowa and Zagłębie Sosnowiec
3	Lower Silesian Voivodeship	Chrobry Głogów, Górnik Polkowice and Miedź Legnica
2	Lesser Poland Voivodeship	Puszcza Niepołomice and Sandecja Nowy Sącz
2	Łódź Voivodeship	ŁKS Łódź and Widzew Łódź
1	Opole Voivodeship	Odra Opole
1	Podkarpackie Voivodeship	Resovia
1	Pomeranian Voivodeship	Arka Gdynia
1	Świętokrzyskie Voivodeship	Korona Kielce
1	Warmian-Masurian Voivodeship	Stomil Olsztyn
0	Greater Poland Voivodeship	
0	Kuyavian-Pomeranian Voivodeship	
0	Lublin Voivodeship	
0	Lubusz Voivodeship	
0	Masovian Voivodeship	
0	Podlaskie Voivodeship	
0	West Pomeranian Voivodeship	

== See also ==
- 2021–22 Ekstraklasa
- 2021–22 II liga
- 2021–22 III liga
- 2021–22 Polish Cup
- 2021 Polish Super Cup
