= Hubert Adamczyk =

Polish footballer

Personal information
- Date of birth: 23 February 1998 (age 28)
- Place of birth: Bydgoszcz, Poland
- Height: 1.80 m (5 ft 11 in)
- Position: Midfielder

Team information
- Current team: Chojniczanka Chojnice
- Number: 27

Youth career
- –2014: Zawisza Bydgoszcz
- 2014–2016: Chelsea

Senior career*
Years	Team	Apps	(Gls)
2016–2018	Cracovia	6	(0)
2017–2018	→ Olimpia Grudziądz (loan)	18	(1)
2018–2021	Wisła Płock	21	(1)
2018–2019	→ GKS Tychy (loan)	26	(6)
2021–2024	Arka Gdynia	88	(24)
2024–2026	Zagłębie Lubin	5	(1)
2024–2026	Zagłębie Lubin II	13	(3)
2026	Pogoń Grodzisk Mazowiecki	12	(0)
2026–	Chojniczanka Chojnice	0	(0)

International career
2013–2014	Poland U16	5	(2)
2013–2015	Poland U17	14	(4)
2015	Poland U18	2	(0)
2015–2017	Poland U19	15	(0)
2017	Poland U20	2	(0)
- * Club domestic league appearances and goals as of 19:36, 26 May 2026 (UTC)

Hubert Adamczyk (born 23 February 1998) is a Polish professional footballer who plays as a midfielder for II liga club Chojniczanka Chojnice.

== Club career ==
Adamczyk began his career at Zawisza Bydgoszcz, of his hometown, Bydgoszcz. He was signed by English Premier League side Chelsea in 2014.

After leaving Chelsea in January 2016, Adamczyk returned to Poland to join Cracovia. He made his debut on 6 March, coming on as a substitute in the 91st minute for Jakub Wójcicki against Lech Poznań in a 2–1 defeat.

On 31 August 2017, he was loaned to Olimpia Grudziądz.

== Career statistics ==
As of match played 24 May 2026

Appearances and goals by club, season and competition
Club	Season	League			Polish Cup		Continental		Other		Total	
Club	Season	Division	Apps	Goals	Apps	Goals	Apps	Goals	Apps	Goals	Apps	Goals
Cracovia	2015–16	Ekstraklasa	1	0	0	0	—		—		1	0
Cracovia	2016–17	Ekstraklasa	4	0	0	0	0	0	—		4	0
Cracovia	2017–18	Ekstraklasa	1	0	0	0	—		—		1	0
Cracovia	Total		6	0	0	0	0	0	—		6	0
Olimpia Grudziądz (loan)	2017–18	I liga	18	1	0	0	—		—		18	1
GKS Tychy (loan)	2018–19	I liga	26	6	1	1	—		—		27	7
Wisła Płock	2019–20	Ekstraklasa	11	1	0	0	—		—		11	1
Wisła Płock	2020–21	Ekstraklasa	10	0	1	0	—		—		11	0
Wisła Płock	Total		21	1	1	0	—		—		22	1
Arka Gdynia	2021–22	I liga	31	14	1	0	—		1 (Note: Appearance(s) in I liga promotion play-offs)	0	33	14
Arka Gdynia	2022–23	I liga	29	7	1	0	—		—		30	7
Arka Gdynia	2023–24	I liga	25	3	3	1	—		1	0	29	4
Arka Gdynia	2024–25	I liga	1	0	—		—		—		1	0
Arka Gdynia	Total		86	24	5	1	—		2	0	93	25
Zagłębie Lubin	2024–25	Ekstraklasa	5	1	1	0	—		—		6	1
Zagłębie Lubin	2025–26	Ekstraklasa	0	0	0	0	—		—		0	0
Zagłębie Lubin	Total		5	1	1	0	—		—		6	1
Zagłębie Lubin II	2024–25	II liga	12	3	0	0	—		—		12	3
Zagłębie Lubin II	2025–26	III liga, gr. III	1	0	1	0	—		—		2	0
Zagłębie Lubin II	Total		13	3	1	0	—		—		14	3
Pogoń Grodzisk Mazowiecki	2025–26	I liga	12	0	—		—		—		12	0
Chojniczanka Chojnice	2026–27	II liga	0	0	0	0	—		—		0	0
Career total			187	36	9	2	0	0	2	0	198	38

== Honours ==
Individual

- I liga Player of the Month: April 2022
