= Arad Bar =

Israeli footballer (born 2000)

Personal information
- Date of birth: 29 January 2000 (age 26)
- Place of birth: Tel Aviv, Israel
- Height: 1.86 m (6 ft 1 in)
- Position: Attacking midfielder

Team information
- Current team: Maccabi Kiryat Gat
- Number: 80

Youth career
- 2010–2015: Maccabi Tel Aviv
- 2015–2019: Maccabi Petah Tikva

Senior career*
Years	Team	Apps	(Gls)
2019–2023	Maccabi Petah Tikva	115	(18)
2023–2024	FC Zürich	0	(0)
2023–2024	FC Zürich U21	6	(1)
2024–2025	LNZ Cherkasy	16	(1)
2025	→ Maccabi Petah Tikva (loan)	8	(0)
2025–2026	Bnei Yehuda	34	(5)
2026–	Maccabi Kiryat Gat	0	(0)

International career
2018–2019	Israel U19	12	(2)
2021–2023	Israel U21	11	(4)
- * Club domestic league appearances and goals as of 24 June 2026

Arad Bar (Hebrew: ערד בר; born 29 January 2000) is an Israeli professional footballer who plays as a midfielder.

== Club career ==
=== Maccabi Petah Tikva ===
Bar started his career in the Maccabi Tel Aviv's children team and in 2015 moved to Maccabi Petah Tikva.

Bar made his senior debut for Maccabi Petah Tikva on 1 August 2019, in a 0–0 draw against Hapoel Afula. 4 weeks later made his league debut in a 1–1 draw against Hapoel Rishon LeZion for the Liga Leumit.

=== FC Zürich ===
He made his first appearance for FC Zürich in a friendly against SpVgg Greuther Fürth on 14 July 2023. Bar only appeared for Zürich's main squad in Swiss Cup games and played for their U21 reserve team in the third-tier Swiss Promotion League.

=== LNZ Cherkasy ===
On 26 January 2024, Zürich announced Bar's transfer to LNZ Cherkasy in Ukraine.
