= Łukasz Bejger =

Polish professional footballer

Personal information
- Date of birth: 11 January 2002 (age 24)
- Place of birth: Golub-Dobrzyń, Poland
- Height: 1.90 m (6 ft 3 in)
- Position: Centre-back

Team information
- Current team: Celje
- Number: 44

Youth career
- –2014: Piłkarz Golub-Dobrzyń
- 2014–2015: Drwęca Golub-Dobrzyń
- 2015–2018: Lech Poznań
- 2018–2021: Manchester United

Senior career*
Years	Team	Apps	(Gls)
2021–2025	Śląsk Wrocław	94	(3)
2021–2022	Śląsk Wrocław II	5	(0)
2025–	Celje	37	(0)

International career
2017–2018	Poland U16	13	(0)
2018–2019	Poland U17	11	(0)
2019–2020	Poland U19	7	(0)
2022	Poland U20	1	(0)
2021–2025	Poland U21	19	(2)
- * Club domestic league appearances and goals as of 19:07, 1 June 2026 (UTC)

Łukasz Bejger (born 11 January 2002) is a Polish professional footballer who plays as a centre-back for Slovenian PrvaLiga club Celje.

== Club career ==
=== Manchester United ===
Bejger joined Lech Poznań from hometown team KS Piłkarz - a club set up in part by his father - in 2015. On 31 July 2018, the centre-back completed a transfer to Premier League side Manchester United. He made six total appearances for the U18s across the 2018–19 season, as well as featuring once in the UEFA Youth League for the U19s; in a 2–1 away win against Valencia on 12 December. Bejger spent the next season with the U18s, appearing twelve times, before moving up with the U23s in 2020–21. Five appearances followed, while he also featured in the EFL Trophy for the U21s; in a 4–0 away loss to Morecambe on 18 November 2020. He had signed a professional contract when he turned seventeen.

=== Śląsk Wrocław ===
On 23 January 2021, Bejger departed Manchester United in order to return to his homeland with Śląsk Wrocław; stating the intention "to obtain experience of senior football", as he penned a four-and-a-half-year contract. He made his senior debut in a Ekstraklasa home match with Pogoń Szczecin on 28 February, featuring for the full duration of a 2–1 victory.

=== Celje ===
On 31 January 2025, Bejger was transferred to Slovenian PrvaLiga club Celje on a two-and-a-half-year deal.

== International career ==
Bejger represented Poland at U16, U17 and U19 level. Having played thirteen times for the U16s across 2017–18, Bejger moved up to the U17s during 2018–19 under manager Przemysław Małecki; soon appearing in six qualifiers for the 2019 UEFA European Under-17 Championship. In November 2019, Bejger made three appearances for the U19s in qualifying for the eventually cancelled 2020 UEFA European Under-19 Championship. March 2021 saw a call-up to the U21s for friendlies with Saudi Arabia U20 and Austria U21 in San Pedro del Pinatar, Spain.

== Style of play ==
Bejger is primarily a centre-back, though is capable of playing at right-back; having played there whilst with Manchester United's academy as well as with the Poland U19s.

== Career statistics ==
As of match played 2 May 2026

Appearances and goals by club, season and competition
Club	Season	League			National cup (Note: Includes Polish Cup)		League cup		Europe		Other		Total	
Club	Season	Division	Apps	Goals	Apps	Goals	Apps	Goals	Apps	Goals	Apps	Goals	Apps	Goals
Manchester United U21	2020–21	—			—		—		—		1 (Note: Appearance in the EFL Trophy)	0	1	0
Śląsk Wrocław	2020–21	Ekstraklasa	11	0	0	0	—		—		—		11	0
Śląsk Wrocław	2021–22	Ekstraklasa	23	0	0	0	—		1 (Note: Appearance(s) in UEFA Conference League)	0	—		24	0
Śląsk Wrocław	2022–23	Ekstraklasa	21	2	2	0	—		—		—		23	2
Śląsk Wrocław	2023–24	Ekstraklasa	32	1	0	0	—		—		—		32	1
Śląsk Wrocław	2024–25	Ekstraklasa	7	0	2	0	—		0	0	—		9	0
Śląsk Wrocław	Total		94	3	4	0	—|		1	0	—		99	3
Śląsk Wrocław II	2021–22	II liga	1	0	0	0	—		—		—		1	0
Śląsk Wrocław II	2022–23	II liga	4	0	0	0	—		—		—		4	0
Śląsk Wrocław II	Total		5	0	0	0	—		—		—		5	0
Celje	2024–25	Slovenian PrvaLiga	11	0	1	0	—		4	0	—		16	0
Celje	2025–26	Slovenian PrvaLiga	26	0	1	0	—		13 (Note: Two appearances in UEFA Europa League, eleven appearances in UEFA Conference League)	0	—		40	0
Celje	Total		37	0	2	0	—		17	0	—		56	0
Career total			136	3	6	0	—|		18	0	1	0	161	3

== Honours ==
Celje

- Slovenian PrvaLiga: 2025–26
- Slovenian Cup: 2024–25

Individual

- Ekstraklasa Young Player of the Month: November 2023
