= 2021–22 II liga =

II liga
- Season: 2021–22
- Dates: 30 July 2021 – 22 May 2022
- Champions: Stal Rzeszów
- Promoted: Stal Rzeszów; Chojniczanka Chojnice; Ruch Chorzów
- Relegated: Wigry Suwałki; Pogoń Grodzisk Maz. Sokół Ostróda; GKS Bełchatów
- Matches: 292
- Goals: 806 (2.76 per match)
- Top goalscorer: Michał Fidziukiewicz (19 goals)
- Biggest home win: Garbarnia 6–1 Śląsk II (28 August 2021); Wigry 5–0 Pogoń Siedlce (9 October 2021); Chojniczanka 5–0 Bełchatów (9 October 2021); Radunia 5–0 Znicz (16 April 2022); Motor 5–0 Sokół (1 May 2022)
- Biggest away win: Kalisz 0–5 Znicz (19 March 2022)
- Highest scoring: Sokół 4–7 Garbarnia (22 May 2022)
- Longest winning run: 7 matches Chojniczanka Chojnice; Motor Lublin
- Longest unbeaten run: 14 matches Chojniczanka Chojnice
- Longest winless run: 13 matches Sokół Ostróda
- Longest losing run: 10 matches Sokół Ostróda
- Highest attendance: 9,237 (Note: Due to the COVID-19 pandemic, the match have been played with a limited number of spectators.); Motor 1–2 Ruch (8 August 2021)
- Lowest attendance: 0 (Note: Due to the COVID-19 pandemic, all Lech's Poznań II home matches.) (Note: Matches have been played behind closed doors without any spectators.); 16 matches
- Total attendance: 307,238 (Note: Due to the COVID-19 pandemic, some matches have been played with a limited number of spectators or behind closed doors without any spectators.)
- Average attendance: 1,113 (Note: Average attendance without matches played behind closed doors without any spectators.) ▲ / 1,052 (Note: Average attendance from all games played.) ▲

The 2021–22 II liga (also known as eWinner II liga due to sponsorship reasons) was the 74th season of the third tier domestic division in the Polish football league system since its establishment in 1948 and the 14th season of the Polish II liga under its current title. The league is operated by the Polish Football Association.

The league was contested by 18 teams. The regular season was played in a round-robin tournament. The season started on 30 July 2021 and concluded on 22 May 2022 (regular season).

== Teams ==
A total of 18 teams participate in the 2021–22 II liga season.

=== Changes from last season ===
The following teams have changed division since the 2020–21 season.

==== To II liga ====
Relegated from 2020–21 I liga	Promoted from 2020–21 III liga
▼GKS Bełchatów	▲ Pogoń Grodzisk Maz. (Group 1) ▲ Radunia Stężyca (Group 2) ▲ Ruch Chorzów (Group 3) ▲ Wisła Puławy (Group 4)

==== From II liga ====
Promoted to 2021–22 I liga	Relegated to 2021–22 III liga
▲ Górnik Polkowice ▲GKS Katowice ▲ Skra Częstochowa	▼ Olimpia Grudziądz ▼ Błękitni Stargard ▼ Bytovia Bytów

=== Stadiums and locations ===
Location of teams in 2021–22 II liga.

Note: Table lists in alphabetical order.

Team	Location	Stadium	Capacity
Chojniczanka Chojnice	Chojnice	Stadion Miejski	3,000
Garbarnia Kraków	Kraków	Stadion RKS Garbarnia	963
GKS Bełchatów	Bełchatów	GIEKSA Arena	5,264
Hutnik Kraków	Kraków	Stadion Suche Stawy	6,000
KKS 1925 Kalisz	Kalisz	Stadion Miejski	8,166
Lech Poznań II	Poznań	Stadion Amiki Wronki	5,296
Motor Lublin	Lublin	Arena Lublin	15,400
Olimpia Elbląg	Elbląg	Stadion Miejski	3,000
Pogoń Grodzisk Mazowiecki	Grodzisk Mazowiecki	Stadion Miejski	1,000
Pogoń Siedlce	Siedlce	Stadion Miejski	2,901
Radunia Stężyca	Stężyca	Arena Radunia	950
Ruch Chorzów	Chorzów	Stadion Ruchu	9,300
Sokół Ostróda	Ostróda	Stadion Miejski	4,998
Stal Rzeszów	Rzeszów	Stadion Stali	11,547
Śląsk Wrocław II	Wrocław	Stadion Oporowska	8,346
Wigry Suwałki	Suwałki	Stadion Miejski	3,060
Wisła Puławy	Puławy	Stadion Miejski	4,418
Znicz Pruszków	Pruszków	Stadion Miejski	1,977

== League table ==
Pos	Team	Pld	W	D	L	GF	GA	GD	Pts	Promotion or Relegation
1	Stal Rzeszów (C, P)	34	23	8	3	75	35	+40	77	Promotion to I liga
2	Chojniczanka Chojnice (P)	34	23	4	7	72	31	+41	73	Promotion to I liga
3	Ruch Chorzów (O, P)	34	17	12	5	48	27	+21	63	Qualification for Promotion play-offs
4	Wigry Suwałki (Note: Wigry Suwałki withdrew from the league at the end of the season, as a result Hutnik Kraków avoided relegation.) (R)	34	18	6	10	58	38	+20	60	Relegation to IV liga
5	Motor Lublin	34	16	11	7	54	31	+23	59	Qualification for Promotion play-offs
6	Radunia Stężyca	34	16	5	13	60	51	+9	53	Qualification for Promotion play-offs
7	Lech Poznań II	34	15	7	12	41	45	−4	52	
8	Garbarnia Kraków	34	13	9	12	51	43	+8	48	
9	Olimpia Elbląg	34	12	10	12	33	32	+1	46 (Note: Ranked on head-to-head points: Olimpia Elbląg 4, Pogoń Siedlce 1.)	
10	Pogoń Siedlce	34	13	7	14	47	55	−8	46	
11	Wisła Puławy	34	12	8	14	56	54	+2	44	
12	Śląsk Wrocław II	34	12	7	15	51	53	−2	43	
13	KKS Kalisz	34	13	3	18	43	48	−5	42	
14	Znicz Pruszków	34	9	12	13	38	45	−7	39	
15	Hutnik Kraków	34	10	5	19	38	55	−17	35	
16	Pogoń Grodzisk Mazowiecki (R)	34	8	7	19	34	54	−20	31	Relegation to III liga
17	Sokół Ostróda (R)	34	4	7	23	32	77	−45	19	Relegation to III liga
18	GKS Bełchatów (Note: GKS Bełchatów was punished with a deduction of 4 points for a licensing process violation. GKS Bełchatów withdrew from the league on 11 March 2022.) (W)	34	6	4	24	17	74	−57	18	Have withdrawn from the league

Source: 90minut.pl
Rules for classification: 1) Points; 2) Head-to-head points; 3) Head-to-head goal difference; 4) Goal difference; 6) Goals scored; 7) Number of wins; 8) Number of away wins. (Note: Head-to-head record is used only after all the matches between the teams in question have been played)
(C) Champions; (O) Play-off winner; (P) Promoted; (R) Relegated; (W) Withdrawn

=== Positions by round ===
Note: The place taken by the team that played fewer matches than the opponents was underlined. (Note: The list of postponed matches: Hutnik Kraków - Garbarnia Kraków (7th round, played on 15 September 2021); Pogoń Siedlce - Lech Poznań II (7th round, played on 15 September 2021); Pogoń Grodzisk Mazowiecki - Lech Poznań II (12th round, played on 20 October 2021); Garbarnia Kraków - Stal Rzeszów (18th round, played on 9 March 2022); Pogoń Siedlce - Ruch Chorzów (18th round, played on 1 December 2021); Lech Poznań II- Znicz Pruszków (20th round, played on 9 March 2022))

Team ╲ Round	1	2	3	4	5	6	7	8	9	10	11	12	13	14	15	16	17	18	19	20	21	22	23	24	25	26	27	28	29	30	31	32	33	34
Stal Rzeszów	1	2	1	1	1	1	1	1	1	1	1	1	1	1	1	1	1	1	1	1	1	1	1	1	1	1	1	1	1	1	1	1	1	1
Chojniczanka Chojnice	2	1	5	3	2	2	4	3	4	4	4	3	3	5	3	3	3	3	2	2	2	2	2	2	2	2	2	2	2	2	2	2	2	2
Ruch Chorzów	9	6	2	2	3	3	2	2	2	2	2	2	2	2	2	2	2	2	3	3	3	3	3	3	3	3	3	3	3	3	3	3	3	3
Wigry Suwałki	17	16	14	10	12	7	9	9	14	10	14	6	9	7	9	7	8	10	7	9	8	7	6	6	5	6	5	5	5	5	5	5	5	4
Motor Lublin	3	10	10	6	10	10	7	5	3	3	3	5	5	6	7	10	7	6	8	7	4	4	4	4	4	4	4	4	4	4	4	4	4	5
Radunia Stężyca	6	9	4	8	6	8	6	7	5	6	6	8	6	4	5	4	4	4	5	4	7	8	10	7	9	9	9	9	7	6	7	6	7	6
Lech Poznań II	13	7	6	11	11	9	10	12	11	8	8	10	8	8	10	8	5	5	4	6	6	6	5	5	6	5	6	6	6	8	6	7	6	7
Garbarnia Kraków	16	8	9	13	13	11	11	11	15	12	11	13	11	9	6	9	10	11	9	8	9	9	8	8	7	8	8	8	9	9	9	9	9	8
Olimpia Elbląg	7	3	11	4	4	4	5	4	6	9	5	4	4	3	4	5	6	9	6	5	5	5	7	9	8	7	7	7	8	7	8	8	8	9
Pogoń Siedlce	9	14	12	12	7	12	13	14	12	14	13	14	12	14	12	13	14	14	14	13	13	14	14	12	13	11	11	10	10	10	10	10	10	10
Wisła Puławy	5	12	8	7	9	13	12	8	7	7	9	9	7	10	8	6	13	7	10	10	10	10	12	14	11	13	13	11	12	12	12	11	12	11
Śląsk Wrocław II	9	5	7	9	5	6	8	10	8	11	10	11	14	12	11	12	9	8	11	11	11	11	9	11	12	14	14	13	13	14	13	12	13	12
KKS Kalisz	7	3	3	4	8	5	3	6	9	5	7	7	10	11	13	11	12	12	12	12	14	13	11	13	14	12	12	14	14	13	14	13	11	13
Znicz Pruszków	15	15	16	15	15	14	14	15	13	15	15	15	15	13	14	14	11	13	13	14	12	12	13	10	10	10	10	12	11	11	11	14	14	14
Hutnik Kraków	9	13	15	16	17	17	17	17	17	17	16	16	17	17	17	17	17	17	17	17	17	17	15	16	15	15	15	15	15	15	15	15	15	15
Pogoń Grodzisk Mazowiecki	4	11	13	14	14	16	15	13	10	13	12	12	13	15	15	15	15	15	15	15	15	15	16	15	16	16	16	16	16	16	16	16	16	16
Sokół Ostróda	14	17	17	18	18	18	18	18	18	18	18	18	18	18	18	18	18	18	18	18	18	18	17	17	17	17	17	17	17	17	17	17	17	17
GKS Bełchatów	18	18	18	17	16	15	16	16	16	16	17	17	16	16	16	16	16	16	16	16	16	16	18	18	18	18	18	18	18	18	18	18	18	18

II liga champion Promotion to I liga
Promotion to I liga
Qualification for Promotion play-offs
Relegation to III liga

Updated to match(es) played on 22 May 2022. Source: 90minut.pl

== Results ==
Home \ Away	CHO	GAR	BEŁ	HUT	KAL	LPO	MOT	ELB	POG	MKP	RAD	RCH	SOK	STA	ŚLĄ	WIG	WIS	ZNI
Chojniczanka Chojnice	—	1–3	5–0	3–2	2–1	2–0	1–0	4–1	1–0	3–0	5–1	1–1	4–0	3–1	2–1	1–0	3–1	1–2
Garbarnia Kraków	3–1	—	1–0	0–0	3–1	1–2	0–1	0–0	2–1	2–2	1–0	0–2	0–0	0–2	6–1	0–2	2–1	1–2
GKS Bełchatów	0–3 (Note: GKS Bełchatów withdrew from the league on 11 March 2022.)	0–3	—	0–3	2–1	0–1	0–3	0–3	0–0	2–0	0–2	2–1	2–0	0–3	1–1	0–3	1–1	3–2
Hutnik Kraków	1–0	1–1	0–1	—	2–0	1–2	1–2	0–3	1–0	1–3	3–2	2–0	2–0	1–2	0–1	2–1	1–3	1–0
KKS Kalisz	2–3	2–1	3–0	2–0	—	2–2	0–0	2–2	2–0	2–3	2–0	1–2	1–2	0–2	3–1	1–0	3–1	0–5
Lech Poznań II	3–2	1–1	3–0	2–0	1–0	—	0–3	0–2	0–2	0–3	1–0	0–1	6–4	0–0	0–4	0–0	4–1	2–1
Motor Lublin	0–0	3–0	4–0	3–0	1–0	2–1	—	1–0	1–0	1–0	2–2	1–2	5–0	0–2	2–0	1–1	4–1	1–1
Olimpia Elbląg	1–1	1–0	2–1	1–0	0–1	1–2	0–0	—	1–0	2–1	0–0	0–0	1–1	0–1	0–1	4–1	0–2	2–0
Pogoń Grodzisk Mazowiecki	0–3	2–2	3–0	2–1	0–2	0–0	1–1	1–0	—	1–2	1–2	1–1	1–3	1–3	2–1	3–1	0–2	0–1
Pogoń Siedlce	0–0	0–2	3–0	0–3	1–0	2–0	4–2	1–1	1–2	—	4–1	1–1	3–0	1–4	0–3	3–2	3–3	1–2
Radunia Stężyca	0–3	0–2	3–0	5–2	1–0	1–0	3–0	3–0	2–1	2–1	—	1–2	2–0	1–3	4–2	1–3	2–2	5–0
Ruch Chorzów	2–1	0–0	4–0	1–0	1–0	2–2	0–0	1–0	4–1	1–1	0–1	—	3–0	0–0	5–2	1–0	2–4	0–0
Sokół Ostróda	1–4	4–7	3–0	2–1	0–2	0–1	1–1	0–1	0–2	0–0	2–3	1–3	—	0–3	1–1	1–3	0–4	2–2
Stal Rzeszów	2–0	5–1	3–0	3–3	4–3	2–2	1–1	0–0	3–1	3–0	1–0	1–2	3–2	—	4–3	2–1	2–0	3–1
Śląsk Wrocław II	1–2	0–4	3–0	1–1	2–0	2–0	2–2	3–0	2–2	1–2	2–5	1–1	0–0	1–2	—	0–1	3–0	3–0
Wigry Suwałki	0–4	1–0	2–1	5–1	3–0	2–0	3–2	1–0	4–0	5–0	3–2	0–2	1–0	3–3	1–0	—	2–0	1–1
Wisła Puławy	1–2	2–2	2–1	4–1	1–3	1–2	3–0	2–3	4–2	3–0	1–1	0–0	2–0	3–1	0–1	0–0	—	1–1
Znicz Pruszków	0–1	2–0	0–0	0–0	0–1	0–1	1–4	1–1	1–1	0–1	2–2	2–0	3–2	1–1	0–1	2–2	2–0	—

Updated to match(es) played on 22 May 2022. Source: 90minut.pl
Legend: Blue = home team win; Yellow = draw; Red = away team win.
For upcoming matches, an "a" indicates there is an article about the rivalry between the two participants.

=== Results by round ===
Team ╲ Round	1	2	3	4	5	6	7	8	9	10	11	12	13	14	15	16	17	18	19	20	21	22	23	24	25	26	27	28	29	30	31	32	33	34
Chojniczanka	W	W	L	W	W	L	L	W	L	W	D	W	L	L	W	D	W	W	W	W	W	W	W	D	W	W	D	W	W	W	L	W	W	W
Garbarnia	L	W	D	L	D	W	D	D	L	W	D	L	W	W	W	L	D	W	W	L	L	L	W	D	W	L	W	L	D	D	W	L	L	W
GKS Bełchatów	L	W	L	D	W	W	L	L	L	L	D	L	W	L	W	L	L	D	D	W	L	L	L	L	L	L	L	L	L	L	L	L	L	L
Hutnik	D	L	L	L	L	L	L	D	W	L	W	L	L	L	L	D	W	L	L	W	L	W	L	D	W	L	W	L	W	D	W	L	W	L
KKS Kalisz	D	W	W	L	L	W	W	L	L	W	L	D	L	D	L	W	L	W	L	L	L	W	W	L	L	W	L	L	L	W	L	W	W	L
Lech II	L	W	W	L	L	W	L	L	W	W	D	D	W	D	D	W	D	W	W	D	L	W	W	L	L	W	L	W	L	L	W	L	W	D
Motor	W	L	D	W	L	D	W	W	W	D	D	D	D	D	L	L	W	D	D	W	W	W	W	W	W	W	W	L	W	L	W	D	D	L
Olimpia	D	W	L	W	W	D	D	W	L	L	W	W	D	W	L	D	L	L	W	W	D	D	L	L	W	D	W	L	D	W	L	D	L	L
Pogoń G.	W	L	L	L	D	D	D	W	W	D	D	D	L	L	L	L	W	L	L	L	L	L	L	W	L	L	L	W	W	D	W	L	L	L
Pogoń S.	D	L	W	L	W	L	D	W	L	L	W	L	W	L	W	L	L	W	D	L	D	L	W	W	L	W	D	W	W	D	L	L	D	W
Radunia	W	L	W	L	W	L	W	L	W	D	D	L	W	W	L	W	W	L	L	W	L	L	L	W	L	D	D	W	W	W	L	W	D	W
Ruch	D	W	W	W	D	D	W	W	W	W	D	W	L	L	W	W	L	D	D	L	D	W	W	D	W	W	W	W	L	D	D	D	D	W
Sokół	L	L	L	L	L	L	L	L	L	L	D	W	L	D	L	L	D	W	L	W	L	D	L	L	L	D	L	D	L	D	L	W	L	L
Stal	W	W	W	W	W	W	D	W	L	W	D	W	W	W	W	W	D	W	L	W	D	W	W	W	W	W	D	L	W	D	W	D	W	D
Śląsk II	D	W	D	D	W	L	D	L	W	L	D	L	L	W	W	L	W	W	L	L	W	W	L	L	L	L	L	D	L	L	W	W	D	W
Wigry	L	L	W	W	L	W	D	D	L	W	L	W	D	W	D	W	L	L	W	L	W	D	W	W	D	L	W	W	L	W	W	W	W	W
Wisła	W	L	D	W	L	L	D	W	W	D	L	D	W	L	W	W	L	D	L	L	W	L	L	L	W	L	D	W	L	D	L	W	D	W
Znicz	L	L	L	W	D	W	L	D	W	L	D	D	D	W	L	D	W	D	D	W	W	L	L	W	D	D	D	L	W	L	D	L	L	L

Updated to match(es) played on 22 May 2022. Source: 90minut.pl
W = Win; D = Draw; L = Loss

== Promotion play-offs ==
II liga play-offs for the 2021–22 season was played on 25 and 29 May 2022. The teams who finished in 3rd, 4th, 5th and 6th place are set to compete. The fixtures are determined by final league position – 3rd team of regular season vs 6th team of regular season and 4th team of regular season vs 5th team of regular season. The winner of final match was promoted to the I liga for next season. All matches was played in a stadiums of team which occupied higher position in regular season.

Semi-finals; 25 May 2022
3	Ruch Chorzów	1
6	Radunia Stężyca	0
4	Wigry Suwałki	0
5	Motor Lublin	4

Final; 29 May 2022
3	Ruch Chorzów	4
5	Motor Lublin	0

== Season statistics ==
=== Top goalscorers ===
Rank	Player	Club	Goals
1	(Poland) Michał Fidziukiewicz	Motor Lublin	19
2	(Poland) Maciej Górski	Pogoń Siedlce	16
3	(Poland) Sebastian Bergier	Śląsk Wrocław II	12
3	(Poland) Artur Pląskowski	Chojniczanka Chojnice	12
5	(Colombia) Jean Franco Sarmiento	Pogoń Grodzisk Mazowiecki	11
5	(Poland) Piotr Giel	KKS 1925 Kalisz	11
5	(Poland) Damian Michalik	Stal Rzeszów	11
5	(Poland) Daniel Szczepan	Ruch Chorzów	11
9	(Portugal) Carlos Daniel	Wisła Puławy	10
9	(Slovakia) Michal Klec	Garbarnia Kraków	10
9	(Poland) Adrian Paluchowski	Wisła Puławy	10
9	(Serbia) Andreja Prokić	Stal Rzeszów	10

== See also ==
- 2021–22 Ekstraklasa
- 2021–22 I liga
- 2021–22 III liga
- 2021–22 Polish Cup
- 2021 Polish SuperCup
