= Hungary national under-21 football team =

National association football team

Hungary Under-21
- Nickname(s): The Magyars; Nemzeti Tizenegy (National Eleven)
- Association: Magyar Labdarúgó Szövetség
- Head coach: Antal Németh
- Captain: Tamás Szűcs
- Most caps: Péter Gulácsi (26)
First colours	Second colours

First international
- U23: Norway 1–0 Hungary (Fredrikstad, Østfold, Norway; 6 October 1970); U21: Hungary 7–0 Greece (Kecskemét, Bács-Kiskun, Hungary; 9 October 1976)

Biggest win
- Hungary 7–0 Greece (Kecskemét, Bács-Kiskun, Hungary; 9 October 1976)

Biggest defeat
- Serbia 8–0 Hungary (Belgrade, Serbia; 7 September 2008)

Olympic Games
- Appearances: 1 (first in 1996)
- Best result: 15th (1996)

UEFA U-21 Championship
- Appearances: 5 (first in 1978)
- Best result: Semi-finals, 1986

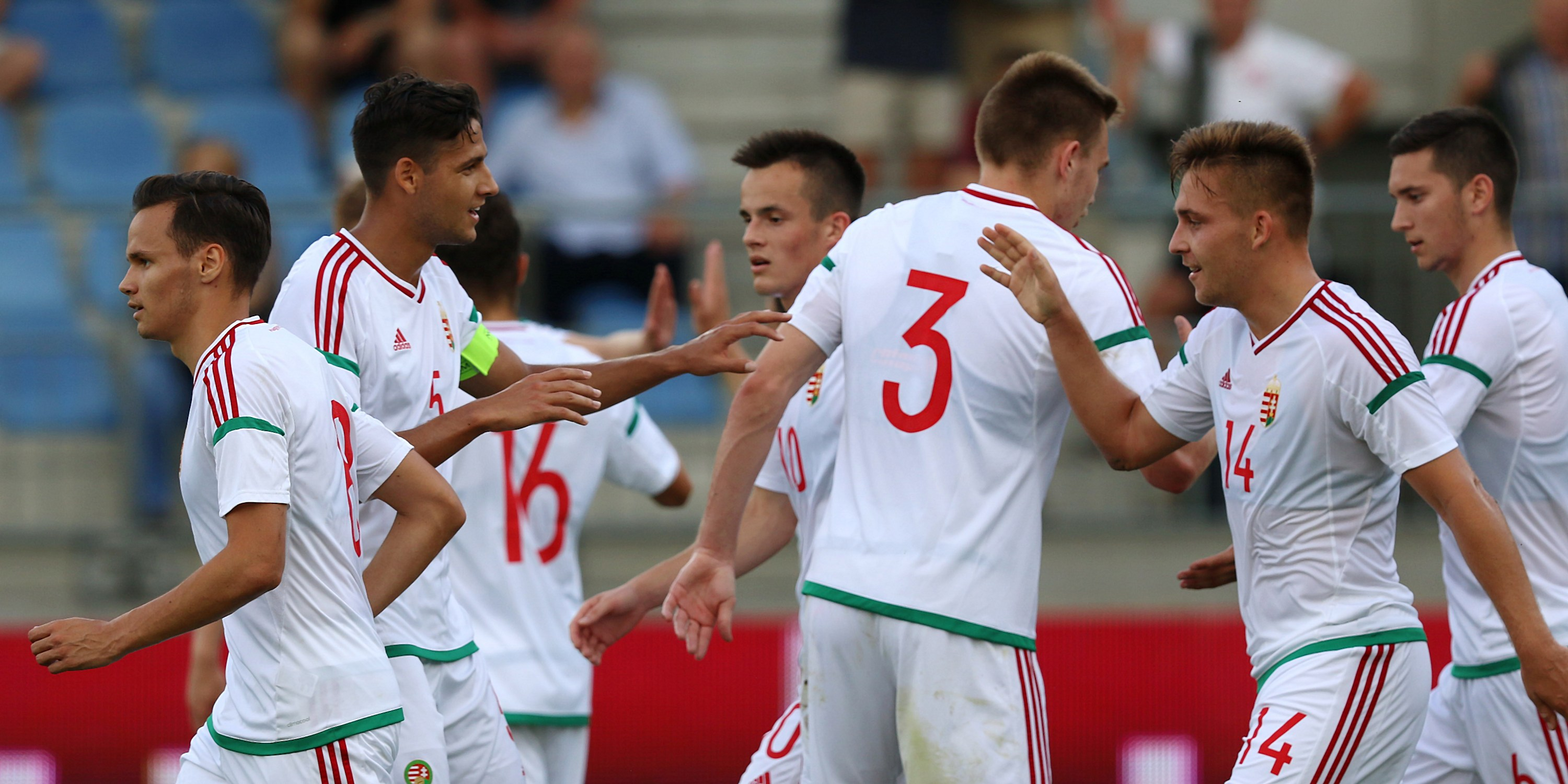
Hungary U-21-national football team goal celebration against Austria

The Hungary national under-21 football team is the national under-21 football team for Hungary and is controlled by the Hungarian Football Federation.

Following the realignment of UEFA's youth competitions in 1976, the Hungarian Under-21 team was formed. The team has a modest record, reaching the last eight of three tournaments, and the semi-finals of one, but failing to qualify for eleven, including the forthcoming 2006 tournament.

Since the under-21 competition rules insist that players must be 21 or under at the start of a two-year competition, technically it is an U-23 competition. For this reason, Hungary's excellent record in the preceding U-23 competitions is also shown.

== Olympics record ==
Olympics record
Year	Host	Round	Position	Pld	W	D	L	GF	GA
Until 1988		See Hungary national football team							
1992	(Spain) Barcelona	did not qualify							
1996	(United States) Atlanta	Group stage	16th	3	0	0	3	3	7
2000	(Australia) Sydney	did not qualify							
2004	(Greece) Athens	did not qualify							
2008	(China) Beijing	did not qualify							
2012	(United Kingdom) London	did not qualify							
2016	(Brazil) Rio de Janeiro	did not qualify							
2020	(Japan) Tokyo	did not qualify							
2024	(France) Paris	did not qualify							
Total		Group stage	1/9	3	0	0	3	3	7

== UEFA U-23 Championship record ==
- 1972: Did not qualify. Finished 2nd of 3 in qualification group.
- 1974: Winners.
- 1976: Runners-up.

== UEFA U-21 Championship record ==
- 1978: Losing quarter-finalists.
- 1980: Losing quarter-finalists.
- 1982: Did not qualify. Finished 2nd of 4 in qualification group.
- 1984: Did not qualify. Finished 3rd of 4 in qualification group.
- 1986: Losing semi-finalists.
- 1988: Did not qualify. Finished 2nd of 4 in qualification group.
- 1990: Did not qualify. Finished 2nd of 3 in qualification group.
- 1992: Did not qualify. Finished 4th of 4 in qualification group.
- 1994: Did not qualify. Finished 4th of 5 in qualification group.
- 1996: Losing quarter-finalists.
- 1998: Did not qualify. Finished 5th of 5 in qualification group.
- 2000: Did not qualify. Finished 4th of 5 in qualification group.
- 2002: Did not qualify. Finished 3rd of 5 in qualification group.
- 2004: Did not qualify. Finished 3rd of 5 in qualification group.
- 2006: Play-off stage.
- 2007: Did not qualify. Finished 2nd of 3 in qualification group.
- 2009: Did not qualify. Finished 3rd of 5 in qualification group.
- 2011: Did not qualify. Finished 3rd of 5 in qualification group.
- 2013: Did not qualify. Finished 4th of 5 in qualification group.
- 2015: Did not qualify. Finished 3rd of 5 in qualification group.
- 2017: Did not qualify. Finished 5th of 6 in qualification group.
- 2019: Did not qualify. Finished 4th of 6 in qualification group.
- 2021: Group stage.
- 2023: Did not qualify. Finished 4th of 6 in qualification group.

== UEFA European Under-21 Football Championship ==
=== 2023 UEFA European Under-21 Championship qualification ===
Pos	Team	Pld	W	D	L	GF	GA	GD	Pts	Qualification	Germany	Israel	Poland	Hungary	Latvia	San Marino
1	Germany	10	9	0	1	32	9	+23	27	Final tournament	—	3–2	0–4	4–0	4–0	4–0
2	Israel	10	6	1	3	19	10	+9	19	Play-offs	0–1	—	2–2	3–0	2–1	2–0
3	Poland	10	5	3	2	26	9	+17	18		1–2	1–2	—	1–1	5–0	3–0
4	Hungary	10	4	2	4	16	17	−1	14		1–5	1–2	2–2	—	1–0	4–0
5	Latvia	10	2	1	7	5	19	−14	7		1–3	1–0	0–2	0–2	—	2–0
6	San Marino	10	0	1	9	0	34	−34	1		0–6	0–4	0–5	0–4	0–0	—

Source: UEFA
Legend: Blue = home team win; Yellow = draw; Red = away team win.
Rules for classification: Tiebreakers

== Results and fixtures ==
Win Draw Loss

== Players ==
=== Current squad ===
The following players were called up for the friendly match against Israel and the 2027 UEFA European Under-21 Championship qualification Group H match against Ukraine on 26 and 31 March 2026; respectively.

Caps and goals correct as of 31 March 2026, after the match against Ukraine.

No.	Pos.	Player	Date of birth (age)	Caps	Goals	Club
1	GK	Ármin Pécsi	24 February 2005 (age 21)	13	0	(The Football Association) Liverpool
12	GK	Benedek Erdélyi	28 September 2005 (age 21)	0	0	(Hungarian Football Federation) Debrecen
22	GK	Bendegúz Lehoczki	28 December 2006 (age 19)	1	0	(Hungarian Football Federation) Csákvár
2	DF	Antal Yaakobishvili	12 July 2004 (age 22)	17	0	(Royal Spanish Football Federation) Tenerife
3	DF	Ákos Markgráf	30 June 2005 (age 21)	9	0	(Hungarian Football Federation) Puskás Akadémia
5	DF	Áron Dragóner	11 June 2004 (age 22)	8	1	(Football Association of Slovenia) Nafta
13	DF	Patrik Kovács	9 February 2005 (age 21)	6	0	(Hungarian Football Federation) MTK Budapest
14	DF	Gergő Bodnar	18 April 2005 (age 21)	5	1	(Hungarian Football Federation) Újpest
15	DF	Barnabás Bíró	6 January 2005 (age 21)	3	0	(Hungarian Football Federation) Győr
24	DF	Csongor Lakatos	29 March 2006 (age 20)	0	0	(Hungarian Football Federation) Ferencváros
4	MF	Noah Fenyő	30 January 2006 (age 20)	7	1	(Hungarian Football Federation) Újpest
6	MF	Rajmund Tóth	9 April 2004 (age 22)	6	0	(Hungarian Football Federation) Győr
7	MF	Botond Vajda	15 March 2004 (age 22)	14	1	(Hungarian Football Federation) Debrecen
8	MF	Kevin Horváth	2 March 2005 (age 21)	7	0	(Hungarian Football Federation) Paks
16	MF	Balázs Manner	26 April 2005 (age 21)	0	0	(Hungarian Football Federation) Nyíregyháza Spartacus
20	MF	Máté Tuboly	15 September 2004 (age 22)	7	2	(Slovak Football Association) Dunajská Streda
21	MF	István Átrok	12 June 2005 (age 21)	4	0	(Hungarian Football Federation) MTK Budapest
23	MF	Kevin Bánáti	11 May 2005 (age 21)	10	0	(Hungarian Football Federation) Győr
	MF	Noel Keresztes	16 September 2004 (age 22)	0	0	(Football Association of Slovenia) Nafta
9	FW	Milán Klausz	24 February 2005 (age 21)	7	1	(Hungarian Football Federation) Kazincbarcikai
10	FW	Zalán Vancsa	27 October 2004 (age 22)	22	1	(Royal Belgian Football Association) Lommel
11	FW	Ádin Molnár	8 August 2004 (age 22)	9	1	(Hungarian Football Federation) MTK Budapest
17	FW	Csanád Vilmos Dénes	17 November 2004 (age 22)	14	1	(Royal Belgian Football Association) Kortrijk
18	FW	Ábel Krajcsovics	17 August 2004 (age 22)	0	0	(Hungarian Football Federation) Újpest
19	FW	Zsombor Gruber	7 September 2004 (age 22)	9	1	(Hungarian Football Federation) Ferencváros

=== Recent callups ===
The following players have been selected by Hungary in the past 12 months.

Pos.	Player	Date of birth (age)	Caps	Goals	Club	Latest call-up
GK	Martin Dala	24 April 2004 (age 22)	2	0	(Hungary) Nyíregyháza	v. Croatia, 18 November 2025
DF	Bendegúz Farkas	5 August 2004 (age 22)	6	0	(Hungary) Nyíregyháza	v. Croatia, 18 November 2025
DF	Dominik Kaczvinszki	1 March 2006 (age 20)	1	0	(Hungary) Újpest	v. Croatia, 18 November 2025
MF	Tamás Szűcs	16 January 2005 (age 21)	11	1	(Hungary) Debrecen	v. Croatia, 18 November 2025
MF	Michael Okeke	16 October 2005 (age 21)	10	0	(Hungary) Puskás Akadémia	v. Croatia, 18 November 2025
MF	László Vingler	31 October 2005 (age 21)	6	0	(Hungary) Győr	v. Croatia, 18 November 2025
MF	Szabolcs Dusinszki	6 August 2005 (age 21)	1	0	(Romania) Csíkszereda Miercurea Ciuc	v. Croatia, 18 November 2025
FW	Krisztián Lisztes	6 May 2005 (age 21)	11	2	(Hungary) Ferencváros	v. Croatia, 18 November 2025
FW	Gábor Jurek	4 June 2004 (age 22)	5	2	(Hungary) Diósgyőr	v. Croatia, 18 November 2025

Notes

- ^{INJ} = Player withdrew from the squad due to an injury
- Names in italics denote players that have been capped for the Senior team.

== Staff ==
=== Technical staff ===
Position	Name
Head coach	(Hungary) Zoltán Szélesi
Assistant coach	(Hungary) György Sándor
Assistant coach	(Hungary) Vilmos Vanczák
Goalkeeping coach	(Hungary) Zoltán Végh
Fitness coach	(Hungary) László Gáspár
Video analyst	(Hungary) István Beregi
Physiotherapist	(Hungary) Dávid Smeló
Physiotherapist	(Hungary) István Selyem
Kit manager	(Hungary) Zoltán Arany
Team Doctor	(Hungary) Iván Kollár
Team Doctor	(Hungary) Márton Tarr
Team manager	(Hungary) Bence Teodoru

=== Administrative staff ===
Position	Name
Delegation Leader	(Hungary) Vince Annus
Secretary	(Hungary) Béla Brünyi
Press Officer	(Hungary) Márton Dinnyés
Kit Manager	(Hungary) László Hegyesi

== See also ==
- Hungary national football team
- Hungary national under-19 football team
- Hungary national under-17 football team
- UEFA European Under-21 Championship
