= Marcel Wędrychowski =

Polish footballer

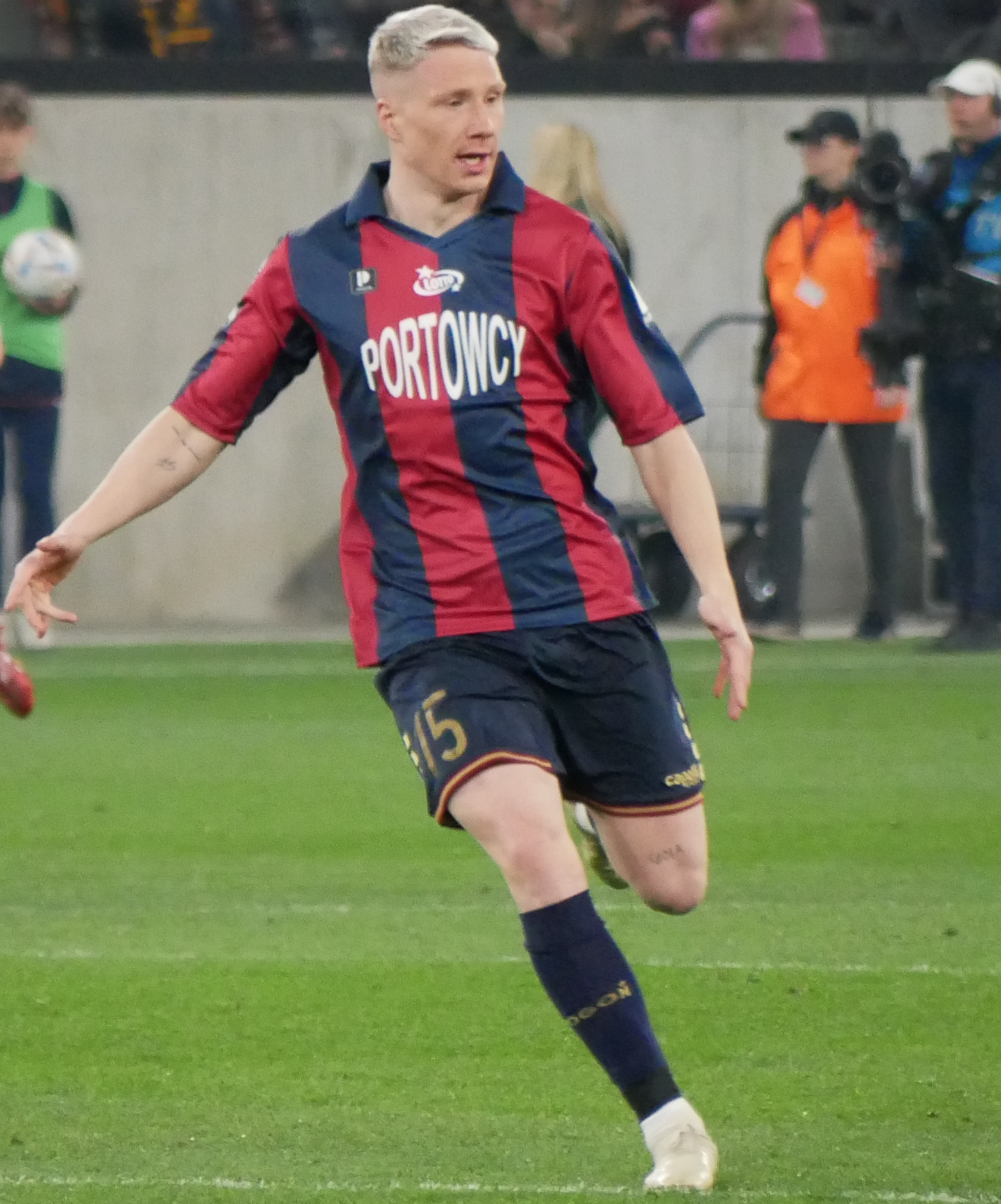
- Wędrychowski with Pogoń Szczecin in 2023

Personal information
- Full name: Marcel Wędrychowski
- Date of birth: 13 January 2002 (age 24)
- Place of birth: Szczecin, Poland
- Height: 1.71 m (5 ft 7 in)
- Position: Winger

Team information
- Current team: GKS Katowice
- Number: 10

Youth career
- –2014: Stal Szczecin
- 2014–2018: Pogoń Szczecin

Senior career*
Years	Team	Apps	(Gls)
2018–2025	Pogoń Szczecin II	48	(4)
2018–2025	Pogoń Szczecin	53	(3)
2021–2022	→ Górnik Łęczna (loan)	18	(1)
2025–	GKS Katowice	28	(2)

International career
2018	Poland U16	7	(0)
2018–2019	Poland U17	8	(2)
2019	Poland U19	7	(0)
2022	Poland U20	3	(1)
2021–2023	Poland U21	4	(1)
- * Club domestic league appearances and goals as of 00:07, 24 May 2026 (UTC)

Marcel Wędrychowski (born 13 January 2002) is a Polish professional footballer who plays as a winger for Ekstraklasa club GKS Katowice.

== Club career ==
=== Pogoń Szczecin ===
Wędrychowski began playing football with his hometown club Stal Szczecin. In 2014, he moved to the academy of Pogoń Szczecin. He was part of the Pogoń youth team that finished as runners-up in the Polish junior championship at under-17 level, before progressing to the club's reserve side in the III liga. During the 2019–20 season, he also began training regularly with Pogoń's first team.

He made his Ekstraklasa debut against Korona Kielce in late 2019. Wędrychowski made two league appearances during the 2019–20 season, both as a substitute, playing a total of 60 minutes.

=== Loan to Górnik Łęczna ===
On 31 August 2021, Wędrychowski joined newly promoted Ekstraklasa club Górnik Łęczna on loan until the end of the 2021–22 season. At the same time, his contract with Pogoń was extended until June 2025.

On 13 September 2021, he scored his first senior goal in Górnik's home match against Wisła Płock. Having entered the match as a substitute, he scored in the second minute of added time to complete a comeback from two goals down and give Górnik a 3–2 victory. He completed the season with 18 league appearances, one goal and two assists.

=== Return to Pogoń Szczecin ===
Wędrychowski returned to Pogoń before the 2022–23 season and became a regular member of its first-team squad. On 11 March 2023, he scored the only goal in a 1–0 away league victory over Zagłębie Lubin, finding the net in added time after coming on as a substitute.

During the following seasons, he continued to appear for Pogoń in the Ekstraklasa, the Polish Cup and European qualifying competitions. On 25 April 2025, he scored Pogoń's fourth goal in a 5–4 away victory against Puszcza Niepołomice.

Wędrychowski left Pogoń following the 2024–25 season. He made 65 competitive appearances for the club's first team, scoring three goals and recording four assists.

=== GKS Katowice ===
On 14 June 2025, Wędrychowski joined GKS Katowice, signing a three-year contract with an option for an additional season. He made his debut for the club on 19 July 2025.

On 28 February 2026, Wędrychowski scored after coming on as a substitute in a 3–1 home victory over Górnik Zabrze in the Silesian derby. On the final matchday of the season, he scored a late equaliser against his former club Pogoń Szczecin, securing a 1–1 away draw for GKS. In his first season in Katowice, he made 28 league appearances and scored twice, in addition to four appearances in the Polish Cup.

== International career ==
Wędrychowski represented Poland at under-16, under-17, under-19, under-20 and under-21 levels.

On 8 October 2021, he appeared for the Poland under-21 team in a European Under-21 Championship qualifier against Hungary. He entered the match in the 71st minute and scored ten minutes later to give Poland a 2–1 lead; the match finished 2–2. He made four appearances and scored once for the under-21 side.
